= List of Executive Office appointments by Joe Biden =

There are about 4,000 positions in the Executive Office of the President of the United States. The core White House staff positions and most Executive Office positions are generally not required to be confirmed by the Senate. The positions that require Senate confirmation include: the director of the Office of Management and Budget, the chair and members of the Council of Economic Advisers, and the United States trade representative.

As of May 23, 2024, according to tracking by The Washington Post and Partnership for Public Service, of the positions that require Senate confirmation, 12 nominees have been confirmed, 1 nominee is being considered by the Senate, and 10 positions currently do not have nominees.

== Color key ==
Denotes appointees awaiting Senate confirmation.

Denotes appointees serving in an acting capacity.

Denotes appointees who have left office or offices which have been disbanded.

== Appointments ==
=== White House Office ===
Office	Appointee	Assumed office	Left office
Office of the White House Chief of Staff
— White House Chief of Staff	Jeff Zients	February 8, 2023	
— White House Chief of Staff	Ron Klain	January 20, 2021	February 7, 2023
— White House Deputy Chief of Staff for Operations	Annie Tomasini	February 9, 2024	—
— White House Deputy Chief of Staff for Operations	Jen O'Malley Dillon	January 20, 2021	February 8, 2024
— White House Deputy Chief of Staff for Policy	Bruce Reed	January 20, 2021	—
— White House Deputy Chief of Staff for Implementation	Natalie Quillian	February 8, 2023	—
— Senior Advisor to the White House Chief of Staff	Katie Reilly	May 2023	—
— Senior Advisor to the White House Chief of Staff	Reema Shah	April 2022	February 2023
— Senior Advisor to the White House Chief of Staff	Elizabeth Wilkins	January 20, 2021	February 2022
— Senior Advisor for Communications to the Chief of Staff	Saloni Sharma	March 2023	—
— Senior Advisor for Communications to the Chief of Staff	Remi Yamamoto	January 20, 2021	March 2023
— Senior Advisor to the White House Deputy Chief of Staff (Bruce Reed)	Vivek Viswanathan	October 2022	—
— Senior Advisor to the White House Deputy Chief of Staff (Bruce Reed)	Zayn Siddique	January 20, 2021	September 2022
— Senior Advisor to the White House Deputy Chief of Staff (Jen O'Malley Dillon)	Thomas Winslow	January 20, 2021	—
Senior Advisors & Counselors to the President
— Counselor to the President	Steve Ricchetti	January 20, 2021	—
— Senior Advisor to the Counselor to the President	John McCarthy	January 20, 2021	—
— Senior Advisor to the President	Mike Donilon	January 20, 2021	—
— Senior Advisor to the President	Anita Dunn	January 20, 2021	August 12, 2021
— Senior Advisor to the President	Anita Dunn	May 5, 2022	August 2024
— Senior Advisor/American Rescue Plan Coordinator	Gene Sperling	March 15, 2021	August 2024
— Senior Advisor/Infrastructure Coordinator	Mitch Landrieu	November 15, 2021	—
— Senior Advisor for Public Engagement; Director of the Office of Public Engagement	Stephen K. Benjamin	April 1, 2023	—
— Senior Advisor for Public Engagement; Director of the Office of Public Engagement	Keisha Lance Bottoms	July 1, 2022	April 1, 2023
— Senior Advisor for Public Engagement; Director of the Office of Public Engagement	Cedric Richmond	January 20, 2021	May 18, 2022
— Senior Advisor for Clean Energy Innovation and Implementation; Director of the Office of Clean Energy Innovation and Implementation	John Podesta	September 2, 2022	—
— Senior Advisor for Migration	Lise Clavel	January 2022	March 1, 2023
— Senior Advisor for Migration	Tyler Moran	July 2021	February 2022
— Senior Advisor for Migration	Amy Pope	March 2021	July 16, 2021
— Senior Advisor for Migration Outreach and Engagement	Alida Garcia	March 2021	September 2021
— Senior Advisor on LGBTQ+ Engagement	Reggie Greer	January 20, 2021	March 25, 2022
Office of Communications
— White House Communications Director	Ben LaBolt	February 2023	—
— White House Communications Director	Kate Bedingfield	January 20, 2021	March 1, 2023
— White House Principal Deputy Communications Director	Kristen Orthman	June 2023	—
— White House Principal Deputy Communications Director	Kate Berner	January 20, 2021	May 31, 2023
— White House Deputy Communications Director	Herbie Ziskend	August 2022	—
— White House Deputy Communications Director	Jennifer Molina	October 2022	—
— White House Deputy Communications Director	Kate Berner	January 20, 2021	August 2022
— White House Deputy Communications Director	Pili Tobar	January 20, 2021	May 2022
— Senior Communications Assistant and Special Assistant to the Director of Communications	Khanya Brann	January 20, 2021	November 2021
— Director of Research	Terry Moynihan	March 2022	—
— Director of Research	Todd Zubatkin	March 2022	—
— Director of Research	Megan Apper	January 20, 2021	January 2022
— Deputy Director of Research	Terry Moynihan	January 20, 2021	—
— Deputy Director of Research	Todd Zubatkin	January 20, 2021	—
— Director of Rapid Response	Michael Gwin	January 20, 2021	June 8, 2022
— Director of Message Planning	Meghan Hays	January 20, 2021	—
— Senior Associate Communications Director	Matthew Hill	January 20, 2021	December 2022
— Senior Regional Communications Director	Rykia Dorsey Craig	October 2021	March 2023
— Senior Regional Communications Director	Paige Hill	January 20, 2021	October 15, 2021
— Regional Communications Director	Seth Schuster	January 20, 2021	—
— Regional Communications Director	Haris Talwar	February 2022	—
— Regional Communications Director	Rykia Dorsey Craig	January 20, 2021	October 2021
— Regional Communications Director	Ike Hajinazarian	January 20, 2021	October 29, 2021
— Senior Director of Coalitions Media	Jennifer Molina	January 20, 2021	October 2022
— Chief of Staff for the Office of Communications	Khanya Brann	November 2021	—
— Chief of Staff for the Office of Communications	Emma Riley	January 20, 2021	November 19, 2021
— Director of Broadcast Media	Lucas Acosta	April 2022	—
— Director of Broadcast Media	Mariel Sáez	January 20, 2021	February 2022
Office of the Press Secretary
— White House Press Secretary	Karine Jean-Pierre	May 13, 2022	—
— White House Press Secretary	Jen Psaki	January 20, 2021	May 13, 2022
— Principal Deputy Press Secretary
— Principal Deputy Press Secretary	Olivia Dalton	September 2022	March 13, 2024
— Principal Deputy Press Secretary	Karine Jean-Pierre	January 20, 2021	May 13, 2022
— White House Deputy Press Secretary	Andrew Bates	March 29, 2021	—
— White House Deputy Press Secretary	Emilie Simons	October 2022	—
— White House Deputy Press Secretary	Chris Meagher	March 3, 2021	September 2022
— White House Deputy Press Secretary	TJ Ducklo	January 20, 2021	February 13, 2021
— Chief of Staff for the Press Office and Special Assistant to the Press Secretary	Robbie Dornbush	June 2022	—
— Chief of Staff for the Press Office and Special Assistant to the Press Secretary	Amanda Finney	January 20, 2021	July 2022
— Assistant Press Secretary	Abdullah Hasan	June 2022	—
— Assistant Press Secretary	Michael Kikukawa	October 2022	—
— Assistant Press Secretary	Robyn Patterson	October 2022	—
— Assistant Press Secretary	Kevin Munoz	January 20, 2021	March 2023
— Assistant Press Secretary	Emilie Simons	April 5, 2021	October 2022
— Assistant Press Secretary	Vedant Patel	January 20, 2021	June 1, 2022
— Assistant Press Secretary	Rosemary Boeglin	January 20, 2021	March 2021
— Press Assistant	Amijah Townsend-Holmes	January 20, 2021	—
— Press Assistant	Angela Perez	January 20, 2021	July 8, 2022
— Press Assistant	Michael Kikukawa	January 20, 2021	June 14, 2022
Office of Speechwriting
— Director of Speechwriting	Vinay Reddy	January 20, 2021	—
— Senior Presidential Speechwriter	Amber Macdonald	January 2021	—
— Senior Presidential Speechwriter	Brenda Jones	July 2022	—
— Senior Presidential Speechwriter	Megan Rooney	September 2022	—
— Senior Presidential Speechwriter	Dan Cluchey	February 2021	May 2023
— Senior Presidential Speechwriter	Jeff Nussbaum	February 2021	April 25, 2022
Office of the First Lady
— White House Social Secretary	Carlos Elizondo	January 20, 2021	—
— White House Deputy Social Secretary	Liz Hart	January 20, 2021	—
Office of Cabinet Affairs
— White House Cabinet Secretary	Evan Ryan	January 20, 2021	—
— White House Deputy Cabinet Secretary	Daniel Koh	August 2022	—
— White House Deputy Cabinet Secretary	Nik Blosser	May 2022	July 15, 2022
— White House Deputy Cabinet Secretary	Cristóbal Alex	January 20, 2021	May 13, 2022
Office of the White House Counsel
— White House Counsel	Ed Siskel	September 2023	—
— White House Counsel	Stuart F. Delery	July 2022	September 2023
— White House Counsel	Dana Remus	January 20, 2021	July 2022
— White House Deputy Counsel	Stuart F. Delery	January 20, 2021	July 2022
— White House Deputy Counsel	Jonathan Su	January 20, 2021	June 2022
— White House Deputy Counsel	Danielle Conley	January 20, 2021	June 2022
— White House Special Counsel	Tona Boyd	January 20, 2021	—
— White House Special Counsel	Abbe Gluck	January 20, 2021	November 2021
— White House Senior Counsel	Paige Herwig	January 20, 2021	
— White House Senior Counsel	Sean Crotty	January 2023	—
— White House Senior Counsel	Alicia O'Brien	February 2021	January 2023
— Legal Advisor to the National Security Council	Jake Phillips	February 2022	—
— Legal Advisor to the National Security Council	Jonathan Cedarbaum	January 20, 2021	February 2022
— Deputy Legal Advisor to the National Security Council	Ashley Deeks	January 20, 2021	—
— White House Senior Associate Counsel	Sean Crotty	September 2022	January 2023
— White House Associate Counsel	Megan Ceronsky	January 20, 2021	—
— White House Associate Counsel	Michael Posada	January 20, 2021	—
— White House Associate Counsel	Jeremy Kreisberg	August 2021	—
— White House Associate Counsel	Jude Volek	August 2021	—
— White House Associate Counsel	Jonathan Meltzer	February 2022	—
— White House Associate Counsel	Jess Blakemore	January 2023	—
— White House Associate Counsel	Jennifer Sokoler	January 20, 2021	January 2023
— White House Associate Counsel	Martine Cicconi	January 20, 2021	December 2022
— White House Associate Counsel	Justin Dews	June 2022	November 2022
— White House Associate Counsel	Vanessa Dube Le	April 2022	October 2022
— White House Associate Counsel	Sean Crotty	January 20, 2021	September 2022
— White House Associate Counsel	Maury Riggan	January 20, 2021	July 2022
— White House Associate Counsel	Erica Songer	January 20, 2021	July 2022
— White House Associate Counsel	Funmi Olorunnipa Badejo	January 20, 2021	June 2022
— White House Associate Counsel	Larry Schwartztol	January 20, 2021	June 2022
— White House Associate Counsel	Lauren Moore	January 20, 2021	April 2022
— White House Associate Counsel	Neha Gupta	January 20, 2021	April 2022
— White House Associate Counsel	Katie Schettig Raut	April 2021	March 2022
— White House Associate Counsel	Janet Kim	January 20, 2021	March 2022
— White House Senior Deputy Associate Counsel	Sam Kleiner	January 20, 2021	October 2021
— White House Deputy Associate Counsel	Jaimie McFarlin	January 20, 2021	August 2022
— White House Deputy Associate Counsel	Caroline McKay	January 20, 2021	August 2022
— White House Deputy Associate Counsel	Justin Dews	January 20, 2021	June 2022
— White House Deputy Associate Counsel	Leah Wong	January 20, 2021	April 2022
— White House Deputy Associate Counsel	Samiyyah Ali	January 20, 2021	February 2022
— White House Deputy Associate Counsel	Reema Shah	January 20, 2021	January 2022
— White House Deputy Associate Counsel	Ephraim McDowell	January 20, 2021	January 2022
Office of Intergovernmental Affairs
— Director of the Office of Intergovernmental Affairs	Tom Perez	June 12, 2023	—
— Director of the Office of Intergovernmental Affairs	Julie Chavez Rodriguez	January 20, 2021	—
— Deputy Director of the Office of Intergovernmental Affairs	Gabe Amo	January 20, 2021	April 2023
— Senior Advisor to Governors	Yvanna Cancela	April 28, 2023	—
— Senior Advisor to Governors	Kate Marshall	September 2021	February 1, 2023
Office of Presidential Personnel
— Director of the Presidential Personnel Office	Gautam Raghavan	January 2022	—
— Director of the Presidential Personnel Office	Catherine M. Russell	January 20, 2021	January 2022
— Deputy Director of the Presidential Personnel Office	Katie Petrelius	January 2022	—
— Deputy Director of the Presidential Personnel Office	Gautam Raghavan	January 20, 2021	January 2022
— Chief of Staff for the Office of Presidential Personnel	Stacy Eichner	January 2022	—
— Vetting Chief of Staff for the Office of Presidential Personnel	Mat Hernandez	January 20, 2021	August 2021
— Special Assistant to the President (Candidate Recruitment)	Claudia Chavez	January 2022	—
— Special Assistant to the President (Climate and Science Agency Personnel)	Rebecca Kasper	September 2022	—
— Special Assistant to the President (Climate and Science Agency Personnel)	Jeff Marootian	January 20, 2021	September 2022
— Special Assistant to the President (Domestic Agency Personnel)	Ruben Gonzales	April 2022	—
— Special Assistant to the President (Domestic Agency Personnel)	Corina Cortez	January 20, 2021	April 2022
— Special Assistant to the President (Economic Agency Personnel)	Namrata Mujumdar	September 2022	—
— Special Assistant to the President (Economic Agency Personnel)	Linda Shim	September 2021	September 2022
— Special Assistant to the President (Economic Agency Personnel)	Karen Andre	January 20, 2021	September 2021
— Special Assistant to the President (Leadership Development and Appointee Engagement)	Vanessa Millones	June 2022	—
— Special Assistant to the President (National Security Agency Personnel)	David E. White, Jr.	January 2022	—
— Special Assistant to the President (National Security Agency Personnel)	Thomas Zimmerman	January 20, 2021	January 2022
— Special Assistant to the President (Personnel Strategy and Operations)	Jamie Citron	January 20, 2021	September 2022
— Special Assistant to the President (Presidential Boards and Commissions)	Meredith Jachowicz	May 2022	—
— Special Assistant to the President (Presidential Boards and Commissions)	Katie Petrelius	January 20, 2021	January 2022
— Director for Leadership & Training	Vanessa Millones	June 2021	June 2022
— Director for Leadership & Training	Dani Durante	January 20, 2021	June 2021
— Director of Priority Placement	Reggie Greer	January 20, 2021	March 25, 2022
— Senior Associate Director of the Presidential Personnel Office (Candidate Recruitment)	Elvir Klempic	August 2022	—
— Senior Associate Director of the Presidential Personnel Office (Candidate Recruitment)	Danielle Okai	January 20, 2021	May 2022
— Senior Associate Director of the Presidential Personnel Office (Climate and Science Agency Personnel)	Paige Nygaard	2022	—
— Senior Associate Director of the Presidential Personnel Office (Domestic Agency Personnel)	Ali Bokhari	2022	—
— Senior Associate Director of the Presidential Personnel Office (Economic Agency Personnel)	Atissa Ladjevardian	May 2022	—
— Senior Associate Director of the Presidential Personnel Office (Economic Agency Personnel)	Brandon Thompson	January 2021	May 13, 2022
— Senior Associate Director of the Presidential Personnel Office (National Security Agency Personnel)	Julianne Rhinebeck	February 2021	November 2022
— Senior Associate Director of the Presidential Personnel Office (Personnel Strategy and Operations)	Ali Greenstein	October 2022	—
— Senior Associate Director of the Presidential Personnel Office (Personnel Strategy and Operations)	Tarah Marshall	September 2021	October 2022
— Senior Associate Director of the Presidential Personnel Office (Presidential Boards and Commissions)	Katie Hendrickson	January 2021	September 2021
— Senior Associate Director of the Presidential Personnel Office (Priority Placements)	Bernadette Hobson	2021	November 2021
— Senior Associate Director of the Presidential Personnel Office	Matt Dannenberg	January 20, 2021	March 2021
— Senior Associate Director of the Presidential Personnel Office	Vanessa Millones	April 2021	June 2021
— Senior Associate Director of the Presidential Personnel Office	Jacob Sztraicher	January 20, 2021	October 2021
— Senior Associate Director of the Presidential Personnel Office	Stacy Eichner	January 20, 2021	January 2022
— Senior Associate Director of the Presidential Personnel Office	Meredith Jachowicz	March 2021	May 2022
— Senior Associate Director of the Presidential Personnel Office	Allison Wong	January 20, 2021	May 2022
— Deputy Associate Counsel and Senior Tax Counsel	Natalie Punchak	June 2022	—
— Deputy Associate Counsel and Senior Tax Counsel	Arielle Borsos	January 2022	July 2022
— Deputy Associate Counsel and Senior Tax Counsel	Shamik Trivedi	June 2021	March 2022
— Deputy Associate Counsel and Senior Tax Counsel	Andrew Strelka	January 20, 2021	August 2021
— Deputy Associate Counsel and Tax Counsel	Jordan Orosz	January 20, 2021	August 2021
Office of Legislative Affairs
— White House Director of Legislative Affairs	Shuwanza Goff	August 1, 2023	—
— White House Director of Legislative Affairs	Louisa Terrell	January 20, 2021	August 1, 2023
— White House Deputy Director of Legislative Affairs	Lee Slater	April 2023	—
— White House Deputy Director of Legislative Affairs	Chris Slevin	January 20, 2021	March 2023
— White House Deputy Director of Legislative Affairs (House Liaison)	Ashley Jones	March 2023	—
— White House Deputy Director of Legislative Affairs (House Liaison)	Shuwanza Goff	January 20, 2021	February 2023
— White House Deputy Director of Legislative Affairs (Senate Liaison)	Reema Dodin	January 20, 2021	—
— Chief of Staff for the Office of Legislative Affairs	Alex Haskell	June 2022	—
— Chief of Staff for the Office of Legislative Affairs	Kaitlyn Hobbs Demers	January 20, 2021	June 2022
— Deputy Chief of Staff for the Office of Legislative Affairs	Dana Shubat	April 2023	—
— Senior Legislative Affairs Advisor	Christopher Garcia	January 20, 2021	—
— Senior Legislative Affairs Advisor	Dana Shubat	January 20, 2021	April 2023
— Senate Legislative Affairs Liaison	Radha Adhar	October 2022	—
— Senate Legislative Affairs Liaison	David Bonine	April 2023	—
— Senate Legislative Affairs Liaison	Vernon Baker	April 2023	—
— Senate Legislative Affairs Liaison	Zephranie Buetow	January 20, 2021	March 2023
— Senate Legislative Affairs Liaison	Chad Metzler	March 9, 2021	November 2022
— Senate Legislative Affairs Liaison	Jonathan Black	March 9, 2021	October 2022
— Senate Legislative Affairs Liaison	Elizabeth Jurinka	March 9, 2021	October 2022
— House Legislative Affairs Liaison	Alicia Molt-West	January 20, 2021	—
— House Legislative Affairs Liaison	Angela Ramirez	January 20, 2021	—
— House Legislative Affairs Liaison	Audra Jackson	April 2023	—
— House Legislative Affairs Liaison	Lee Slater	January 20, 2021	April 2023
— House Legislative Affairs Liaison	Ashley Jones	January 20, 2021	March 2023
— Director of Confirmations	Roberto Berrios	September 2022	—
— Director of Confirmations	Jim Secreto	January 20, 2021	September 2022
Oval Office Operations
— White House Director of Oval Office Operations	Richard Ruffner	February 9, 2024	—
— White House Director of Oval Office Operations	Annie Tomasini	January 20, 2021	February 9, 2024
— White House Deputy Director of Oval Office Operations	Ashley Williams	January 20, 2021	—
— Personal Aide to the President of the United States	Jacob Spreyer	September 2022	—
— Personal Aide to the President of the United States	Stephen Goepfert	January 20, 2021	August 2022
National Economic Council
— Director of the National Economic Council	Lael Brainard	February 21, 2023	—
— Director of the National Economic Council	Brian Deese	January 20, 2021	February 21, 2023
— Deputy Director of National Economic Council
— Deputy Director of National Economic Council	Daniel Hornung	August 2023	—
— Deputy Director of National Economic Council	Jon Donenberg	November 2023	—
— Deputy Director of National Economic Council	Navtej Dhillon	March 2024	—
— Deputy Director of National Economic Council	Bharat Ramamurti	January 20, 2021	September 2023
— Deputy Director of National Economic Council	Sameera Fazili	January 20, 2021	December 2, 2022
— Deputy Director of National Economic Council	David Kamin	January 20, 2021	May 27, 2022
— Deputy Director of National Economic Council	Aviva Aron-Dine	May 2022	February 2024
— Deputy Director of National Economic Council	Joelle Gamble	April 2023	March 2024
— Chief of Staff for the National Economic Council	Leandra English	March 5, 2021	—
— Deputy Assistant to the President for Labor and the Economy	Brendan Danaher	August 2023	–
— Deputy Assistant to the President for Labor and the Economy	Celeste Drake	July 2022	August 6, 2023
— Deputy Assistant to the President for Labor and the Economy	Seth D. Harris	March 5, 2021	July 2022
— Special Assistant to the President (Budget and Tax Policy)	Nadiya Beckwith-Stanley	January 20, 2021	—
— Special Assistant to the President (Climate Change Finance)	Clare Sierawski	August 2021	—
— Special Assistant to the President (Economic Policy)	Elizabeth Kelly	January 2022	—
— Special Assistant to the President (Economic Policy)	Hannah Garden-Monheit	May 2022	—
— Special Assistant to the President (Economic Policy)	Michael Negron	August 2022	—
— Special Assistant to the President (Economic Policy)	Joelle Gamble	January 20, 2021	May 2022
— Special Assistant to the President (Economic Policy)	Daniel Hornung	January 2021	July 2023
— Special Assistant to the President (Economic Development and Industrial Strategy)	Alex Jacquez	December 2022	—
— Special Assistant to the President (Manufacturing and Industrial Policy)	Monica Gorman	September 2022	—
— Special Assistant to the President (Manufacturing and Industrial Policy)	Elisabeth Reynolds	April 2021	October 2022
— Special Assistant to the President (Technology and Competition Policy)	Tim Wu	March 5, 2021	—
— Special Assistant to the President (Transportation and Infrastructure Policy)	Samantha Silverberg	February 2021	—
Domestic Policy Council
— Director of the Domestic Policy Council	Neera Tanden	May 26, 2023	–
— Director of the Domestic Policy Council	Susan Rice	January 20, 2021	May 26, 2023
— Deputy Director of the Domestic Policy Council (Economic Mobility)	Zayn Siddique	September 2022	—
— Deputy Director of the Domestic Policy Council (Economic Mobility)	Carmel Martin	January 20, 2021	September 2022
— Deputy Director of the Domestic Policy Council (Health and Veterans Affairs)	Christen Linke Young	January 20, 2021	—
— Deputy Director of the Domestic Policy Council (Immigration)	Betsy Lawrence	February 2022	—
— Deputy Director of the Domestic Policy Council (Immigration)	Esther Olavarria	January 20, 2021	February 2022
— Deputy Director of the Domestic Policy Council (Racial Justice and Equity)	Jenny Yang	April 2023	—
— Deputy Director of the Domestic Policy Council (Racial Justice and Equity)	Chiraag Bains	October 25, 2021	March 2023
— Deputy Director of the Domestic Policy Council (Racial Justice and Equity)	Catherine Lhamon	January 20, 2021	October 2021
— Chief of Staff for the Domestic Policy Council	Priya Singh	July 2022	—
— Chief of Staff for the Domestic Policy Council	Erin Pelton	May 2021	July 2022
— Executive Secretary of the Domestic Policy Council	Alex Yudelson	January 2022	August 2022
— Executive Secretary of the Domestic Policy Council	Alex Pascal	January 2021	January 2022
— Senior Advisor to the Director of the Domestic Policy Council	Stefanie Feldman	January 20, 2021	—
— Senior Advisor for Communications to the Director of the Domestic Policy Council	Rykia Dorsey Craig	March 2023	—
— Senior Advisor for Communications to the Director of the Domestic Policy Council	Patrick Rodenbush	June 2021	March 2023
— Senior Advisor for Communications to the Director of the Domestic Policy Council	Erin Pelton	January 2021	May 2021
— Special Assistant to the President & Senior Policy Advisor of the Domestic Policy Council	Alex Pascal	January 2022	—
— Special Assistant to the President (Agriculture and Rural Policy)	Kelliann Blazek	January 2021	—
— Special Assistant to the President (Criminal Justice and Guns Policy)	Vanessa Chen	October 2021	—
— Special Assistant to the President (Criminal Justice and Guns Policy)	Chiraag Bains	January 2021	October 25, 2021
— Special Assistant to the President (Democracy and Civic Participation)	Justin Vail	January 2021	—
— Special Assistant to the President (Education Policy)	Maureen Tracey-Mooney	January 2021	November 2022
— Special Assistant to the President (Housing and Urban Policy)	Erika Poethig	January 2021	April 2023
— Special Assistant to the President (Immigration)	Leidy Perez-Davis	March 2022	—
— Special Assistant to the President (Immigration)	Tyler Moran	January 20, 2021	July 2021
— Special Assistant to the President (Labor and Workers)	Pronita Gupta	January 2021	—
— Special Assistant to the President (Native Affairs)	Libby Washburn	January 2021	May 2022
— Special Assistant to the President (Public Health and Disparities)	Catherine Oakar	January 2021	—
— Special Assistant to the President (Public Health and Science)	Sandra Elizabeth Ford	May 10, 2021	—
— Special Assistant to the President (Racial and Economic Justice)	Amber Greene	July 2022	—
— Special Assistant to the President (Racial and Economic Justice)	Donald K. Sherman	February 2021	October 2021
— Special Assistant to the President (Economic Mobility and Racial Justice and Equity)	Elizabeth Brown	June 2021	—
— Special Assistant to the President (Economic Mobility and Racial Justice and Equity)	Stephonn Alcorn	January 2021	June 2021
— Special Assistant to the President (Veterans Affairs)	Terri Tanielian	January 2021	—
National Security Council
— National Security Advisor	Jake Sullivan	January 20, 2021	—
— Principal Deputy National Security Advisor	Jon Finer	January 20, 2021	—
— Deputy National Security Advisor (Cyber & Emerging Tech)	Anne Neuberger	January 20, 2021	—
— Deputy National Security Advisor (International Economics)	Mike Pyle	May 2022	—
— Deputy National Security Advisor (International Economics)	Daleep Singh	February 2021	May 2022
— Homeland Security Advisor	Elizabeth Sherwood-Randall	January 20, 2021	—
— Deputy Homeland Security Advisor	Joshua Geltzer	July 2021	—
— Deputy Homeland Security Advisor	Russell Travers	January 20, 2021	October 1, 2021
— Deputy Homeland Security Advisor (Resilience and Response)	Caitlin Durkovich	October 2022	—
— Executive Secretary of the National Security Council Chief of Staff to the National Security Council	Curtis Ried	September 2022	—
— Executive Secretary of the National Security Council Chief of Staff to the National Security Council	Yohannes Abraham	January 20, 2021	September 2022
— Deputy Executive Secretary of the National Security Council Deputy Chief of Staff to the National Security Council	Ryan Harper	January 20, 2021	—
— Senior Advisor to National Security Advisor	Ariana Berengaut	January 20, 2021	—
— Senior Advisor to the Principal Deputy National Security Advisor	Ella Lipin	January 20, 2021	—
— Senior Advisor to the Homeland Security Advisor	Hilary Hurd	January 20, 2021	January 2023
— Senior Advisor to the Homeland Security Advisor	John MacWilliams	January 2021	—
— Special Advisor on the National Security Council (African Leaders Summit)	Dana L. Banks	July 2022	—
— Coordinator for Defense and Arms Control	Cara L. Abercrombie	June 2022	2023
— Coordinator for Democracy and Human Rights	Rob Berschinski	February 2022	—
— Coordinator for Democracy and Human Rights	Shanthi Kalathil	January 20, 2021	February 2022
— Coordinator for the Indo Pacific	Vacant	—	—
— Coordinator for the Indo Pacific	Kurt M. Campbell	January 20, 2021	February 12, 2024
— Coordinator for the Middle East and North Africa	Brett McGurk	January 20, 2021	—
— Coordinator for the Southern Border on the National Security Council	Roberta Jacobson	January 20, 2021	April 2021
— Coordinator for Strategic Communications	John Kirby	June 6, 2022	—
— Coordinator for Technology and National Security	Jason Matheny	March 2021	June 2022
— Senior Director on the National Security Council (African Affairs)	Judd Devermont	July 2022	—
— Senior Director on the National Security Council (African Affairs)	Dana L. Banks	January 20, 2021	July 2022
— Senior Director on the National Security Council (Arms Control, Disarmament & Non-Proliferation)	Pranay Vaddi	May 2022	—
— Senior Director on the National Security Council (Arms Control, Disarmament & Non-Proliferation)	Mallory Stewart	January 20, 2021	April 18, 2022
— Senior Director on the National Security Council (China)	Sarah Beran	March 2023	—
— Senior Director on the National Security Council (China)	Laura Rosenberger	January 20, 2021	March 2023
— Senior Director on the National Security Council (Counter-terrorism)	Clare Linkins	January 20, 2021	May 2022
— Senior Director on the National Security Council (Cyber Policy)	Andrew Scott	August 2021	July 2022
— Senior Director on the National Security Council (Cyber Policy)	Michael Sulmeyer	January 2021	May 10, 2021
— Senior Director on the National Security Council (Cybersecurity and Emerging Technology)	Steven M. Kelly	July 2022	—
— Senior Director on the National Security Council (Cybersecurity and Emerging Technology)	Amit Mital	April 2021	July 29, 2022
— Senior Director on the National Security Council (Defense)	Cara L. Abercrombie	January 20, 2021	2023
— Senior Director on the National Security Council (Democracy and Human Rights)	Rob Berschinski	March 2021	—
— Senior Director on the National Security Council (Development, Global Health & Humanitarian Response)	Paula Garcia Tufro	September 2022	—
— Senior Director on the National Security Council (Development, Global Health & Humanitarian Response)	Linda Etim	January 20, 2021	Summer 2022
— Senior Director on the National Security Council (East Asia and Oceania)	Edgard Kagan	January 20, 2021	—
— Senior Director on the National Security Council (Energy & Climate Change)	Melanie Nakagawa	January 20, 2021	August 30, 2022
— Senior Director on the National Security Council (Europe)	Amanda Sloat	January 20, 2021	—
— Senior Director on the National Security Council (Executive Secretariat)	Maury Riggan	September 2022	—
— Senior Director on the National Security Council (Global Health Security and Biodefense)	Raj Panjabi	February 2022	—
— Senior Director on the National Security Council (Global Health Security and Biodefense)	Elizabeth Cameron	January 20, 2021	February 2022
— Senior Director on the National Security Council (Intelligence Programs)	Maher Bitar	January 21, 2021	—
— Senior Director on the National Security Council (International Economics and Competitiveness)	Christina Segal-Knowles	September 2022	—
— Senior Director on the National Security Council (International Economics and Competitiveness)	Peter Harrell	January 20, 2021	September 2022
— Senior Director on the National Security Council (International Economics and Labor)	Jennifer M. Harris	March 2021	—
— Senior Director on the National Security Council (Legislative Affairs)	Casey Redmon	February 2022	—
— Senior Director on the National Security Council (Legislative Affairs)	Rebecca Brocato	January 20, 2021	January 2022
— Senior Director on the National Security Council (Middle East and North Africa)	Barbara A. Leaf	January 20, 2021	May 2022
— Senior Director on the National Security Council (Multilateral Affairs)	Josh Black	May 2023	—
— Senior Director on the National Security Council (Multilateral Affairs)	Curtis Ried	2021	September 2022
— Senior Director on the National Security Council (Partnerships and Global Engagement)	Amanda Mansour	August 2021	—
— Senior Director on the National Security Council (Partnerships and Global Engagement)	Tanya Bradsher	January 20, 2021	March 2021
— Senior Director on the National Security Council (Press) Spokesperson for the National Security Council	Adrienne Watson	March 31, 2022	—
— Senior Director on the National Security Council (Press) Spokesperson for the National Security Council	Emily Horne	January 20, 2021	March 30, 2022
— Senior Director on the National Security Council (Resilience and Response)	Jason Tama	November 2022	April 2023
— Senior Director on the National Security Council (Resilience and Response)	Caitlin Durkovich	January 20, 2021	October 2022
— Senior Director on the National Security Council (Russia and Central Asia)	Nicholas Berliner	March 2023	
— Senior Director on the National Security Council (Russia and Central Asia)	Eric Green	January 2021	March 2023
— Senior Director on the National Security Council (Russia and Central Asia)	Andrea Kendall-Taylor	N/A	N/A Announced but did not serve
— Senior Director on the National Security Council (South Asia)	Sumona Guha	January 20, 2021	October 2022
— Senior Director on the National Security Council (Speechwriting and Strategic Initiatives)	Carlyn Reichel	January 20, 2021	—
— Senior Director on the National Security Council (Strategic Planning)	Thomas J. Wright	April 2022	—
— Senior Director on the National Security Council (Strategic Planning)	Sasha Baker	January 20, 2021	February 2022
— Senior Director on the National Security Council (Technology and National Security)	Tarun Chhabra	January 20, 2021	—
— Senior Director on the National Security Council (Transborder)	Katie Tobin	January 20, 2021	—
— Senior Director on the National Security Council (Western Hemisphere Affairs)	Juan Gonzalez	January 20, 2021	—
— Senior Director on the National Security Council (White House Situation Room)	Marc Gustafson	March 2022	—
— Senior Director on the National Security Council (White House Situation Room)	Mark Damiano	January 2021	March 2022
Office of the National Cyber Director
— National Cyber Director	Harry Coker	December 15, 2023 (Confirmed December 12, 2023, 59–40)	—
— National Cyber Director	Chris Inglis	July 11, 2021 (Confirmed June 17, 2021 by voice vote)	February 15, 2023
Office of Management and Administration
— Director of Management and Administration	Dave Noble	August 19, 2022	January 2025
— Director of Management and Administration	Anne Filipic	January 20, 2021	August 2022
— Deputy Director of Management and Administration	Jeffrey Wexler	April 2023	January 2025
— Deputy Director of Management and Administration	Elizabeth Pan		January 2025
— Deputy Director for the Office of Administration	Sarah Feldmann	October 2021	January 2025
— Deputy Director for the Office of Administration	Faisal Amin	March 9, 2021	July 2021
— Deputy Director of Management and Administration (Operations)	Dana Rosenzweig	March 9, 2021	—
— Deputy Director of Management and Administration (Personnel)	Christian Peele	January 20, 2021	—
— Chief of Staff for the Office of Management and Administration	Frances Dougherty	February 2022	—
— Chief of Staff for the Office of Management and Administration	Sarah Feldmann	January 20, 2021	October 2021
— General Counsel for the Office of the Management and Administration	Daniel Jacobson	March 9, 2021	June 2022
— Chief Diversity and Inclusion Director	Michael Leach	January 20, 2021	—
— Chief Official White House Photographer	Adam Schultz	January 20, 2021	January 2025
— Director of Technology	Austin Lin	September 2022	January 2025
— Director of Technology	David Recordon	January 20, 2021	September 2022
— Deputy Director of Technology	Marcela Escobar-Alava	March 2021	—
— Deputy Director of Technology	Austin Lin	January 20, 2021	September 2022
— Director of COVID-19 Operations	Jeffrey Wexler	January 20, 2021	April 2023
Office of Digital Strategy
— Director of Digital Strategy	Christian Tom	July 6, 2023	January 2025
— Director of Digital Strategy	Rob Flaherty	January 20, 2021	June 2023
— Deputy Director of Digital Strategy	Tericka Lambert	August 2022	January 2025
— Deputy Director of Digital Strategy	Christian Tom	January 20, 2021	August 2022
— Deputy Director of Digital Strategy	Rebecca Rinkevich	January 20, 2021	June 2022
— Senior Advisor for Digital Strategy	Patrick Stevenson	June 2023	January 2025
— Platform Manager	Brendan Cohen	January 20, 2021	—
— Digital Partnerships Manager	Maha Ghandour	January 20, 2021	—
— Video Producer-Editor	Eric Bravo	January 20, 2021	August 2022
— Video Director	Melanie Duran	January 2024	January 2025
— Video Director	Rachel Velasquez	August 2022	—
— Video Director	Jonathan Hebert	January 20, 2021	June 2022
— Senior Video Producer	Aaron Wilson Watson	September 2022	January 2025
— Director of Presidential Video Production	Joy Ngugi	—	January 2025
— Senior Presidential Producer	Joy Ngugi	August 2022	—
— Presidential Videographer	Jenna Sumar	August 2022	—
— Presidential Videographer	Drew Heskett	January 20, 2021	August 2022
— Director of Platforms	Angela Krasnick	June 2022	January 2025
— Director of Platforms	Jaime Lopez	January 20, 2021	—
— Deputy Director of Platforms	Avery Whitehead	June 2022	January 2025
— Deputy Director of Platforms	Megan Coyne	August 2022	January 2025
— Deputy Director of Platforms	Andy Volosky	September 2024	January 2025
— Deputy Director of Platforms	Brendan Cohen	—	June 2022
— Creative Director	Meena Yi	June 2022	January 2025
— Creative Director	Carahna Magwood	January 20, 2021	—
— Deputy Creative Director	Abbey Pitzer	—	January 2025
— Senior Designer	Abbey Pitzer	August 2023	—
— Designer	Abbey Pitzer	January 20, 2021	August 2023
— Traveling Content Director	Olivia Raisner	January 20, 2021	—
— Partnerships Manager	Aisha Shah	January 20, 2021	—
— Director of Partnerships	Marian Dimaano	November 2023	January 2025
— Deputy Director of Partnerships	Morgan MacNaughton	August 2023	January 2025
— Director of Digital Engagement	Ariana Mushnick	September 2022	January 2025
— Director of Digital Engagement	Cameron Trimble	January 20, 2021	—
— Digital Engagement Coordinator	Sam Schmir	—	January 2025
White House Office of the Staff Secretary
— White House Staff Secretary	Stefanie Feldman	May 26, 2023	–
— White House Staff Secretary	Neera Tanden	October 22, 2021	May 26, 2023
— White House Staff Secretary	Jessica Hertz	January 20, 2021	October 22, 2021
— White House Deputy Staff Secretary	Michael Hochman	January 20, 2021	June 2022
— Director of Presidential Correspondence	Garrett Lamm	September 2021	—
— Director of Presidential Correspondence	Eva Kemp	March 9, 2021	September 2021
Office of Scheduling and Advance
— Director of Scheduling and Advance	Ryan Montoya	January 20, 2021	—
— Director of Presidential Scheduling	Araz Pourmorad	June 2021	—
— Director of Presidential Scheduling	Lisa Kohnke	January 20, 2021	July 2021
— Director of Presidential Advance	Connolly Keigher	May 17, 2021	—
Office of Political Strategy and Outreach
— Director of Political Strategy and Outreach	Emmy Ruiz	January 20, 2021	—
— Deputy Director of Political Strategy and Outreach	Alana Mounce	July 2022	—
— Deputy Director of Political Strategy and Outreach	Erin Wilson	January 20, 2021	May 30, 2022
— Director of Strategic Planning	Carla Frank	February 2021	—
— Director of Strategic Outreach	Natalie Montelongo	July 2022	—
Office of Public Engagement
— Principal Deputy Director of the Office of Public Engagement	Jamie Citron	September 2022	—
— Deputy Director of the Office of Public Engagement	Tara Murray	September 2022	—
— Deputy Director of the Office of Public Engagement	Adrian Saenz	January 20, 2021	August 3, 2022
Office of Clean Energy Innovation and Implementation
— Deputy Director of the Office of Clean Energy Innovation and Implementation	Kristina Costa	September 2022	—
White House Military Office
— Director of the White House Military Office	Maju Varghese	March 9, 2021	January 21, 2022
Commission on White House Fellowships
— Director of President's Commission on White House Fellowships	Rose Vela	March 15, 2021	—

=== Office of Domestic Climate Policy ===
Office	Appointee	Assumed office	Left office
— National Climate Advisor	Ali Zaidi	September 16, 2022	—
— National Climate Advisor	Gina McCarthy	January 20, 2021	September 16, 2022
— Deputy National Climate Advisor	Ali Zaidi	January 20, 2021	September 16, 2022
— Special Presidential Envoy for Climate	John Podesta	March 6, 2024	—
— Special Presidential Envoy for Climate	John Kerry	January 20, 2021	March 6, 2024
— Chief of Staff for the Office of Domestic Climate Policy	Maggie Thomas	January 20, 2021	—
— Special Assistant to the President for Climate Policy	David J. Hayes	January 20, 2021	September 2022
— Special Assistant to the President for Climate Policy	John B. Rhodes	August 2021	August 2022
— Special Assistant to the President for Climate Policy	Philip Giudice	February 2021	June 2021
— Special Assistant to the President for Climate Policy and Finance	Jahi Wise	June 2022	January 2023
— Special Assistant to the President for Climate Policy, Innovation, and Deployment	Sonia Aggarwal	June 2022	—
— Senior Advisor for Climate Policy and Finance	Jahi Wise	January 20, 2021	June 2022
— Senior Advisor for Climate Policy and Innovation	Sonia Aggarwal	January 20, 2021	June 2022

=== President's Council of Advisors on Science and Technology ===
Office	Appointee	Assumed office	Left office
— Co-chair of the President's Council of Advisors on Science and Technology	Frances Arnold	January 20, 2021	—
— Co-chair of the President's Council of Advisors on Science and Technology	Maria Zuber	January 20, 2021	—
— Co-chair of the President's Council of Advisors on Science and Technology	Arati Prabhakar	October 3, 2022	—
— Co-chair of the President's Council of Advisors on Science and Technology	Francis Collins	February 18, 2022	October 3, 2022
— Co-chair of the President's Council of Advisors on Science and Technology	Eric Lander	September 22, 2021	February 18, 2022
— Member of the President's Council of Advisors on Science and Technology	Dan Arvizu	September 22, 2021	—
— Member of the President's Council of Advisors on Science and Technology	John Banovetz	September 22, 2021	—
— Member of the President's Council of Advisors on Science and Technology	Frances Colón	September 22, 2021	—
— Member of the President's Council of Advisors on Science and Technology	Lisa Cooper	September 22, 2021	—
— Member of the President's Council of Advisors on Science and Technology	John Dabiri	September 22, 2021	—
— Member of the President's Council of Advisors on Science and Technology	Bill Dally	September 22, 2021	—
— Member of the President's Council of Advisors on Science and Technology	Sue Desmond-Hellmann	September 22, 2021	—
— Member of the President's Council of Advisors on Science and Technology	Inez Fung	September 22, 2021	—
— Member of the President's Council of Advisors on Science and Technology	Andrea Goldsmith	September 22, 2021	—
— Member of the President's Council of Advisors on Science and Technology	Laura H. Greene	September 22, 2021	—
— Member of the President's Council of Advisors on Science and Technology	Paula T. Hammond	September 22, 2021	—
— Member of the President's Council of Advisors on Science and Technology	Eric Horvitz	September 22, 2021	—
— Member of the President's Council of Advisors on Science and Technology	Joe Kiani	September 22, 2021	—
— Member of the President's Council of Advisors on Science and Technology	Jonathan Levin	September 22, 2021	—
— Member of the President's Council of Advisors on Science and Technology	Stephen W. Pacala	September 22, 2021	—
— Member of the President's Council of Advisors on Science and Technology	Saul Perlmutter	September 22, 2021	—
— Member of the President's Council of Advisors on Science and Technology	William H. Press	September 22, 2021	—
— Member of the President's Council of Advisors on Science and Technology	Penny Pritzker	September 22, 2021	—
— Member of the President's Council of Advisors on Science and Technology	Jennifer Richeson	September 22, 2021	—
— Member of the President's Council of Advisors on Science and Technology	Vicki Sato	September 22, 2021	—
— Member of the President's Council of Advisors on Science and Technology	Lisa Su	September 22, 2021	—
— Member of the President's Council of Advisors on Science and Technology	Kathryn D. Sullivan	September 22, 2021	—
— Member of the President's Council of Advisors on Science and Technology	Terence Tao	September 22, 2021	—
— Member of the President's Council of Advisors on Science and Technology	Phil Venables	September 22, 2021	—
— Member of the President's Council of Advisors on Science and Technology	Catherine Woteki	September 22, 2021	—
— Member of the President's Council of Advisors on Science and Technology	Dennis Assanis	May 2022	—
— Member of the President's Council of Advisors on Science and Technology	Ash Carter	September 22, 2021	October 24, 2022 Died in office
— Member of the President's Council of Advisors on Science and Technology	Marvin Adams	September 22, 2021	April 2022

=== President's Intelligence Advisory Board ===
Office	Appointee	Assumed office	Left office
— Chair of the President's Intelligence Advisory Board	James A. Winnefeld Jr.	May 4, 2022	—
— Member of the President's Intelligence Advisory Board	Gilman Louie	May 4, 2022	—
— Member of the President's Intelligence Advisory Board	Janet Napolitano	May 4, 2022	—
— Member of the President's Intelligence Advisory Board	Richard R. Verma	May 4, 2022	—
— Member of the President's Intelligence Advisory Board	Evan Bayh	June 15, 2022	—
— Member of the President's Intelligence Advisory Board	Jeremy Bash	August 26, 2022	—
— Member of the President's Intelligence Advisory Board	Blair Effron	August 26, 2022	—
— Member of the President's Intelligence Advisory Board	Anne Finucane	October 14, 2022	—
— Member of the President's Intelligence Advisory Board	Mark Angelson	November 22, 2022	—
— Member of the President's Intelligence Advisory Board	Margaret Hamburg	January 26, 2023	—
— Member of the President's Intelligence Advisory Board	Kim Cobb	January 26, 2023	—
— Member of the President's Intelligence Advisory Board	Kneeland Youngblood	January 26, 2023	—

=== Office of National Drug Control Policy ===
Office	Appointee	Assumed office	Left office
— Director of National Drug Control Policy	Rahul Gupta	November 5, 2021 (Confirmed October 28, 2021 by voice vote)	—
— Deputy Director of National Drug Control Policy	Regina LaBelle	February 3, 2021	—
— Chief of Staff to the Director of National Drug Control Policy	Mario Moreno	February 3, 2021	—

=== Office of Science and Technology Policy ===
Office	Nominee	Assumed office	Left office
— Director of the Office of Science and Technology Policy	Arati Prabhakar	October 3, 2022 (Confirmed September 22, 2022, 56–40)	—
— Director of the Office of Science and Technology Policy	Alondra Nelson	February 18, 2022	October 3, 2022
— Director of the Office of Science and Technology Policy	Eric Lander	June 2, 2021 (Confirmed May 28, 2021 by voice vote)	February 18, 2022 Resigned amid reports that he bullied staff members
— Principal Deputy Director of the Office of Science and Technology Policy (Policy)	Kei Koizumi	October 2021	—
— Deputy Director of the Office of Science and Technology Policy (Climate and Environment)	Jane Lubchenco	March 2021	—
— Deputy Director of the Office of Science and Technology Policy (Energy)	Sally Benson	November 2021	July 2023
— Deputy Director of the Office of Science and Technology Policy (Health and Life Sciences)	Carrie Wolinetz	April 2021	October 2022
— Principal Deputy Director of the Office of Science and Technology Policy (Science and Society)	Alondra Nelson	January 20, 2021	February 17, 2023
— Chief of Staff to the Office of Science and Technology Policy	Asad Ramzanali	November 2022	—
— Chief of Staff to the Office of Science and Technology Policy	Marc Aidinoff		
— Chief of Staff to the Office of Science and Technology Policy	Marc Aidinoff	October 2021	November 2022
— Chief of Staff to the Office of Science and Technology Policy	Kei Koizumi	January 20, 2021	October 2021
— Legislative Affairs Director of the Office of Science and Technology Policy	Asad Ramzanali	May 2022	November 2022
— Legislative Affairs Director of the Office of Science and Technology Policy	Narda Jones	January 20, 2021	—

=== Council on Environmental Quality ===
Office	Nominee	Assumed office	Left office
— Chair of the Council on Environmental Quality	Brenda Mallory	April 16, 2021 (Confirmed April 14, 2021, 53–45)	—
— Senior Director for Environmental Justice	Jalonne White-Newsome	May 2022	—
— Senior Director for Environmental Justice	Cecilia Martinez	January 20, 2021	January 2022

=== Office of the United States Trade Representative ===
Office	Nominee	Assumed office	Left office
— United States Trade Representative	Katherine Tai	March 18, 2021 (Confirmed March 17, 2021, 98–0)	—
— United States Deputy Trade Representative	Sarah Bianchi	October 4, 2021 (Confirmed September 23, 2021, 85–11)	January 29, 2024
— United States Deputy Trade Representative	Jayme White	September 27, 2021 (Confirmed September 22, 2021, 80–18)	November 1, 2023
— United States Deputy Trade Representative (Geneva)	María Luisa Pagán	March 14, 2022 (Confirmed March 10, 2022, 80–19)	—
— Chief Agricultural Negotiator	Doug McKalip	January 9, 2023 (Confirmed December 22, 2022 by voice vote)	—
— General Counsel	Greta Peisch	February 2, 2021	—

=== Office of Management and Budget ===
Office	Nominee	Assumed office	Left office
— Director of the Office of Management and Budget	Shalanda Young	March 24, 2021	March 17, 2022
— Director of the Office of Management and Budget	Shalanda Young	March 17, 2022 (Confirmed March 15, 2022, 61–36)	—
— Deputy Director of the Office of Management and Budget	Nani A. Coloretti	April 5, 2022 (Confirmed March 29, 2022, 57–41)	—
— Deputy Director of the Office of Management and Budget	Shalanda Young	March 24, 2021 (Confirmed March 23, 2021, 63–37)	March 17, 2022
— Deputy Director for Management; Office of Management and Budget & Chief Performance Officer of the United States	Jason Miller	April 28, 2021 (Confirmed April 27, 2021, 81–13)	—
— General Counsel for the Office of Management and Budget	Daniel Jacobson	June 2022	—
— General Counsel for the Office of Management and Budget	Samuel Bagenstos	January 20, 2021	June 2022
— Chief of Staff for the Office of Management and Budget	Karen De Los Santos	May 1, 2023	—
— Chief of Staff for the Office of Management and Budget	Rachel Wallace	October 2021	April 2023
— Chief of Staff for the Office of Management and Budget	Nikki Budzinski	February 2021	July 16, 2021
— Director of Made in America	Livia Shmavonian	October 2022	
— Director of Made in America	Celeste Drake	April 27, 2021	July 2022
Office of E-Government & Information Technology
— Federal Chief Information Officer of the United States	Clare Martorana	March 9, 2021	—
Office of Information and Regulatory Affairs
— Administrator of the Office of Information and Regulatory Affairs	Richard Revesz	January 2023 (Confirmed December 21, 2022 by voice vote)	—

=== Council of Economic Advisors ===
Office	Nominee	Assumed office	Left office
— Chair of the Council of Economic Advisers	Jared Bernstein	July 10, 2023 (Confirmed June 13, 2023, 50–49)	—
— Chair of the Council of Economic Advisers	Dr. Cecilia Rouse	March 12, 2021 (Confirmed March 2, 2021, 95–4)	March 31, 2023
— Members of the Council of Economic Advisers	Heather Boushey	January 20, 2021	—
— Members of the Council of Economic Advisers	Kirabo Jackson	August 2023	–
— Members of the Council of Economic Advisers	Jared Bernstein	January 20, 2021	July 10, 2023

=== White House COVID-19 Response Team ===
Office	Appointee	Assumed office	Left office
— Coordinator of COVID-19 Response	Ashish Jha	April 5, 2022	—
— Coordinator of COVID-19 Response	Jeff Zients	January 20, 2021	April 5, 2022
— Deputy Coordinator of COVID-19 Response	Lisa Barclay	April 2022	—
— Deputy Coordinator of COVID-19 Response	Natalie Quillian	January 20, 2021	April 5, 2022
— Chief Science Officer of COVID-19 Response	David A. Kessler	January 20, 2021	—
— Senior Advisor to the COVID-19 Response Coordinator	Andy Slavitt	January 20, 2021	June 8, 2021
— COVID-19 Senior Policy Advisor	Sonya Bernstein	January 20, 2021	—
— COVID-19 Senior Policy Advisor	Amy Chang	January 20, 2021	—
— COVID-19 Senior Policy Advisor	Osaremen Okolo	January 20, 2021	—
— COVID-19 Senior Policy Advisor	Vidur Sharma	January 20, 2021	—
— COVID-19 Senior Policy Advisor	Cameron Webb	January 20, 2021	—
— Vaccinations Coordinator	Bechara Choucair	January 20, 2021	—
— COVID Intergovernmental Affairs Director	Eduardo Cisneros	January 20, 2021	—
— COVID Digital Director	Clarke Humphrey	January 20, 2021	—
— Testing Coordinator	Carol Johnson	January 20, 2021	—
— Supply Coordinator	Tim Manning	January 20, 2021	—
— COVID-19 Response Team Deputy Chief of Staff	Rosa Po	January 20, 2021	—
— Director of Strategic Communications and Engagement	Courtney Rowe	January 20, 2021	—
— COVID-19 Data Director	Dr. Cyrus Shahpar	January 20, 2021	—
— Deputy Director of Strategic Communications and Engagement	Ben Wakana	January 20, 2021	—
— Chief Medical Advisor to the President	Anthony Fauci	January 20, 2021	December 31, 2022
— Chair of COVID-19 Equity Task Force	Marcella Nunez-Smith	January 20, 2021	—
— Members of COVID-19 Equity Task Force	Mayra E. Alvarez	February 10, 2021	—
— Members of COVID-19 Equity Task Force	James Hildreth	February 10, 2021	—
— Members of COVID-19 Equity Task Force	Andrew Imparato	February 10, 2021	—
— Members of COVID-19 Equity Task Force	Victor Joseph	February 10, 2021	—
— Members of COVID-19 Equity Task Force	Joneigh Khaldun	February 10, 2021	—
— Members of COVID-19 Equity Task Force	Octavio Martinez	February 10, 2021	—
— Members of COVID-19 Equity Task Force	Tim Putnam	February 10, 2021	—
— Members of COVID-19 Equity Task Force	Vincent Toranzo	February 10, 2021	—
— Members of COVID-19 Equity Task Force	Mary Turner	February 10, 2021	—
— Members of COVID-19 Equity Task Force	Homer Venters	February 10, 2021	—
— Members of COVID-19 Equity Task Force	Bobby Watts	February 10, 2021	—
— Members of COVID-19 Equity Task Force	Haeyoung Yoon	February 10, 2021	—
— Director of Economic Policy and Budget	Charles Anderson	March 5, 2021	—
— Director of Strategic Operations and Policy	Sam Berger	March 5, 2021	—

=== White House Gender Policy Council ===
Office	Appointee	Assumed office	Left office
— Co-Chair and Executive Director of the White House Gender Policy Council	Jennifer Klein	January 20, 2021	—
— Co-Chair of the White House Gender Policy Council	Julissa Reynoso Pantaleón	January 20, 2021	January 7, 2022
— Deputy Director of the White House Gender Policy Council	Shilpa Phadke	March 2021	August 2022
— Special Assistant to the President for Gender Policy	Latifa Lyles	August 2022	—
— Special Assistant to the President for Gender Policy	Kalisha Dessources Figures	March 2021	May 2022

=== White House Office of Faith-Based and Neighborhood Partnerships ===
Office	Appointee	Assumed office	Left office
— Executive Director of the White House Office of Faith-Based and Neighborhood Partnerships	Melissa Rogers	February 14, 2021	—
— Deputy Director of the White House Office of Faith-Based and Neighborhood Partnerships	Josh Dickson	February 14, 2021	—

=== White House Environmental Justice Advisory Council ===
Office	Appointee	Assumed office	Left office
— Members of White House Environmental Justice Advisory Council	LaTricea Adams	March 29, 2021	—
— Members of White House Environmental Justice Advisory Council	Susana Almanza	March 29, 2021	—
— Members of White House Environmental Justice Advisory Council	Jade Begay	March 29, 2021	—
— Members of White House Environmental Justice Advisory Council	Maria Belen-Power	March 29, 2021	—
— Members of White House Environmental Justice Advisory Council	Robert D. Bullard	March 29, 2021	—
— Members of White House Environmental Justice Advisory Council	Tom Cormons	March 29, 2021	—
— Members of White House Environmental Justice Advisory Council	Andrea Delgado	March 29, 2021	—
— Members of White House Environmental Justice Advisory Council	Catherine Flowers	March 29, 2021	—
— Members of White House Environmental Justice Advisory Council	Jerome Foster II	March 29, 2021	—
— Members of White House Environmental Justice Advisory Council	Kim Havey	March 29, 2021	—
— Members of White House Environmental Justice Advisory Council	Angelo Logan	March 29, 2021	—
— Members of White House Environmental Justice Advisory Council	Maria Lopez-Nunez	March 29, 2021	—
— Members of White House Environmental Justice Advisory Council	Harold Mitchell	March 29, 2021	—
— Members of White House Environmental Justice Advisory Council	Richard Moore	March 29, 2021	—
— Members of White House Environmental Justice Advisory Council	Rachel Morello-Frosch	March 29, 2021	—
— Members of White House Environmental Justice Advisory Council	Juan Parras	March 29, 2021	—
— Members of White House Environmental Justice Advisory Council	Michele Roberts	March 29, 2021	—
— Members of White House Environmental Justice Advisory Council	Ruth Santiago	March 29, 2021	—
— Members of White House Environmental Justice Advisory Council	Nicky Sheats	March 29, 2021	—
— Members of White House Environmental Justice Advisory Council	Peggy Shepard	March 29, 2021	—
— Members of White House Environmental Justice Advisory Council	Carletta Tilousi	March 29, 2021	—
— Members of White House Environmental Justice Advisory Council	Vi Waghiyi	March 29, 2021	—
— Members of White House Environmental Justice Advisory Council	Kyle Whyte	March 29, 2021	—
— Members of White House Environmental Justice Advisory Council	Beverly Wright	March 29, 2021	—
— Members of White House Environmental Justice Advisory Council	Hli Xyooj	March 29, 2021	—
— Members of White House Environmental Justice Advisory Council	Miya Yoshitani	March 29, 2021	—

== Withdrawn nominations ==
Office	Appointee	Announced	Withdrawn	Notes
— Director of the Office of Management and Budget	Neera Tanden	November 30, 2020	March 2, 2021	
Chief Agricultural Negotiator	Elaine Trevino	September 13, 2021	March 15, 2022	
— Intellectual Property Enforcement Coordinator	Deborah Robinson	May 8, 2023	January 3, 2025	
Controller of the Office of Federal Financial Management	Laurel Blatchford	October 26, 2021	October 11, 2022	
Administrator for Federal Procurement Policy	Biniam Gebre	August 4, 2021	June 7, 2022	
— Chief Innovation and Intellectual Property Negotiator	Christopher Wilson	August 10, 2021	January 3, 2023	
— United States Deputy Trade Representative	Nelson Cunningham	January 11, 2024	May 23, 2024	

== See also ==
- Joe Biden Supreme Court candidates
- Cabinet of Joe Biden, for the vetting process undergone by top-level roles including advice and consent by the Senate
- Sr. Advisor to the President, the role formerly held by Karl Rove under George W. Bush, then by Valerie Jarrett/David Axelrod/etc. under Barack Obama
- List of executive branch 'czars' e.g. Special Advisor to the President
- List of federal judges appointed by Joe Biden
