= Jerome Foster II =

American climate activist (born 2002)

- Foster attending the NAT Gala 2026.

Member of the White House Environmental Justice Advisory Council
- In office March 29, 2021 – January 20, 2025
- President: Joe Biden
- Preceded by: Office established

Personal details
- Born: May 9, 2002 (age 24) Washington, D.C., U.S.
- Spouse: Elijah McKenzie-Jackson
- Education: Harvard Extension School; Pace University
- Occupation: social entrepreneur, activist, public speaker
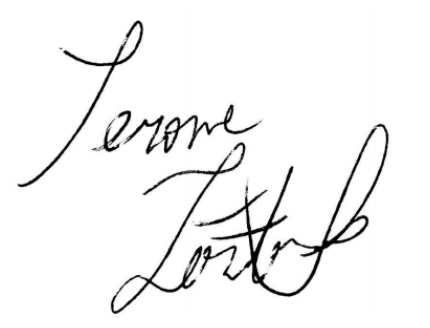
- Signature
- Website: jeromefosterii.com

Jerome Foster II (born May 9, 2002) is an American environmental justice activist and public speaker. In March 2021, at age 18, he was appointed to the White House Environmental Justice Advisory Council in the Biden administration, becoming the youngest White House advisor in United States history. While on the council, he helped launch the American Climate Corps, and in 2024 he was named a Time Next Generation Leader.

Foster rose to prominence as a teenage organizer of Fridays for Future in the United States, holding weekly climate strikes at the front gates of the White House for more than 57 weeks and helping organize some of the largest climate marches in Washington, D.C. At 16 he interned for U.S. Representative John Lewis, an experience he has said deepened his understanding of intersectionality. His advocacy connects climate action with social and economic justice. At 14 he served on the D.C. State Board of Education's Advisory Council.

In 2019 Foster founded the youth voting organization OneMillionOfUs, which grew into the youth-led news, arts and civic media platform Waic Up. As a speaker, he has addressed the United Nations High Commission on Human Rights in April 2019 and the United Nations Youth Climate Summit in September 2019.

== Early life ==
Jerome Foster II was born in Washington, D.C., on May 9, 2002, to René Foster and Jerome Foster Sr. Foster attended Washington Leadership Academy High School, graduating in June 2020. In 2019, he was selected by the D.C. Office of the State Superintendent of Education to attend Harvard University during his eleventh grade summer. In 2018, as a National Geographic scholar, he spent 15 days in Iceland filming its landscape in virtual reality to document the effects of climate change. Foster graduated from high school in June 2020 and studies computer science at Pace University.

== Activism ==
=== TAU VR ===
When Foster was 14 years old, he founded an immersive technology organization, TAU VR, which built virtual reality environments regarding American history, climate change, and Latin American immigration to the United States. In September 2017, TAU VR was featured on XQ Super School Live, which was aired on ABC, CBS, NBC, and FOX and told the story of his third-place finish at the World Series of Entrepreneurship.

=== The Climate Reporter ===
Foster, in November 2017, founded The Climate Reporter, an international youth-led climate-focused news outlet, and served as its editor in chief.

=== White House climate strikes ===
As a part of Greta Thunberg's School Strike for Climate protest, Foster held weekly climate strikes in front of the White House in Lafayette Square. On September 13, 2019, Thunberg as a part of her trans-American voyage to COP 25 in Santiago, Chile joined Foster's White House climate strikes which drew thousands to the site. Through organizing these climate strikes, Foster met Jane Fonda and has gone on to collaborate with Fonda on her Fire Drill Fridays. Foster has credited the strikes, along with youth testimony before the Council of the District of Columbia, with helping pass the Clean Energy DC Omnibus Act.

=== OneMillionOfUs and Waic Up ===
Foster founded OneMillionOfUs in early 2019. It is an international nonprofit youth voting and advocacy organization. According to Britannica, it reached its goal of registering one million young voters, and in 2020 it grew into Waic Up, a youth-led news, arts and civic media platform that Foster co-founded. It aims to "educate, empower and mobilise a movement of young people to be civically active and engage on the local and global stage through their intersectional youth-focused civic partnerships", OneMillionOfUs built a coalition intended to help young people pursue change in their communities, schools and political offices. This organization also created a "Uniting Youth Coalition" representing 5 youth social movements: gun violence, climate change, immigration reform, gender equality, and racial equality to have a space on both the local and international level to coordinate events and campaigns between movements.

=== Public speaking ===
Foster spoke at the United Nations High Commission on Human Rights and the United Nations Youth Climate Summit in 2019. During the COP26 summit in Glasgow, he spoke on the panel "Passing the Torch: Intergenerational Climate Dialogues" at The New York Times Climate Hub. In June 2022 he headlined the U.S. Green Building Council's USGBC Live conference in Washington, D.C., whose other headline speakers included Secretary of Energy Jennifer Granholm. In October 2024 he gave the keynote address opening Sustainability Month at the Rochester Institute of Technology, speaking on climate activism, environmental racism and the role of young people in climate action. The following month he was the keynote speaker at the Adirondack Youth Climate Summit, hosted by The Wild Center.

=== COP27 and LGBTQ+ rights ===
In July 2022, Foster and his partner, Elijah McKenzie-Jackson, wrote to UNFCCC Executive Secretary Patricia Espinosa urging the United Nations to move the COP27 climate summit out of Egypt, citing the country's treatment of LGBTQ+ people, women and civil rights advocates. Foster is openly bisexual, and The Guardian reported that the couple might be targeted if they attended. The letter was signed by activists including Nadya Tolokonnikova, Ahmed Alaa and Eric Njuguna, and the couple called the UNFCCC's inaction "inherent discrimination." Foster argued that "Cop27 will fail if it's in Egypt because critical voices will be left out."

== Politics ==
=== District of Columbia State Board of Education ===
At 15 years old, Foster became the sole student representative serving on the District of Columbia State Board of Education High School Graduation Requirements Task Force, working to modernize high school graduation requirements starting with the class of 2030 across the District.

=== Congressional internship ===
At 16, Foster interned for U.S. Representative John Lewis, the civil rights leader, whom he has described as a mentor. On Fridays during his internship, he held weekly climate rallies at the front gates of the White House as a part of Greta Thunberg's Fridays For Future movement, advocating for the Climate Change Education Act, a bill to make environmental education a core subject in American schools and fund university climate research.

=== The White House ===
On March 29, 2021, the White House announced that Foster, at 18 years old, would serve as an advisor on the White House Environmental Justice Advisory Council, providing recommendations on environmental injustice. During his tenure on the council, Foster helped launch the American Climate Corps, a concept stemming from President Franklin D. Roosevelt's Civilian Conservation Corps; by late September 2024, more than 15,000 young Americans had been placed in clean energy and climate resilience jobs through the program. The program initially aimed to grow by 50,000 members each year through 2031, but it was rescinded in 2025. Foster was asked to serve a second term on the council. He has also served as a climate activist advisor to the American Lung Association's Stand Up for Clean Air initiative.

== Personal life ==
Foster has been in a relationship with British climate activist Elijah McKenzie-Jackson since 2021. They announced their engagement on June 11, 2023. The two later married.

== Honors and awards ==
- 2025 Trailblazer Award winner at Verdical Group's annual Net Zero Conference
- World Series of Entrepreneurship
- D.C. State Board of Education Leadership and Commitment Award
- Union of Concerned Scientists' Defender of Science Award
- Audubon Naturalist Society Youth Environmental Champion Award
- Grist 50! Environmental Fixer Achievement
- The Root's Young Futurist Achievement
- Captain Planet Foundation Young Superhero for Earth Award
- Business Insider Climate Action 30 Achievement
- Time Next Generation Leader (2024)
- National Geographic scholar (2018)
- American Society of Landscape Architects New York Chapter President's Dinner honoree (2023)

== Filmography ==
Year	Film/Show Title	Role	Film/Show Genre
2017	XQ Super School Live	As himself	LIVE Event
2020	I Am Greta	As himself	Documentary
2021	Earth Day! The Musical	As himself	TV special
2021	Hulu's Your Attention Please: Initiative 29	As himself	Streaming Series
