= Peggy Shepard =

American local government and environmentalist

Peggy M. Shepard
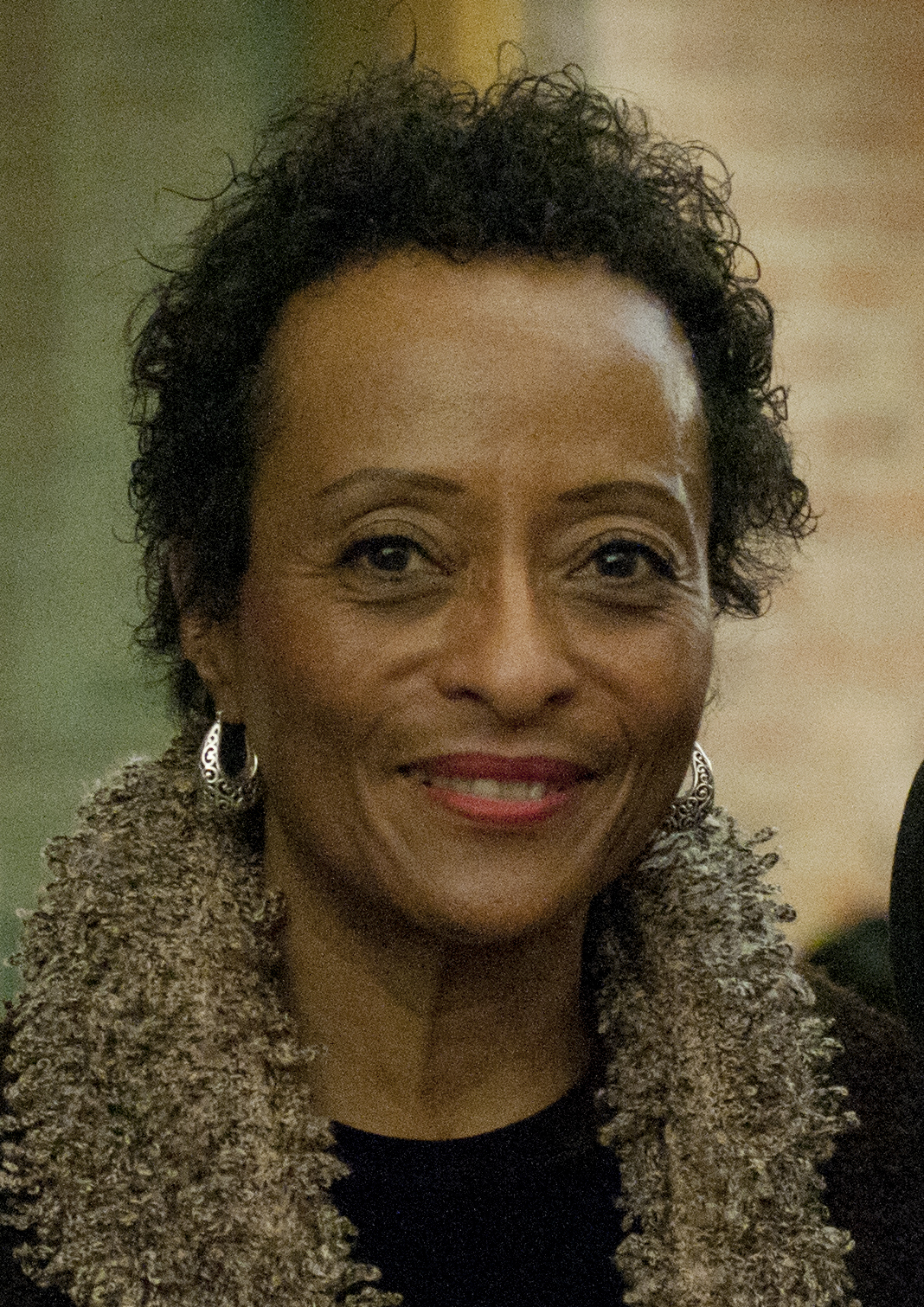
- Peggy M. Shepard
- Education: Howard University (BA)
- Organization: WE ACT
- Known for: Environmental activism

Peggy Shepard is co-founder and executive director of the not-for-profit WE ACT for Environmental Justice in New York in the USA. She has been involved with organizing environmental protection campaigns in and around New York since the 1980s, and also works on many social action committees.

Shepard holds a National Order of Merit from France and gave a TED talk in 2022.

== Career ==
Initially a journalist at the Indianapolis News, and their first African-American reporter, she moved to New York in 1971 to work in publishing. Following an editorial role at Black Enterprise magazine, she changed jobs to speechwriting for the New York state government. In 1979 she took the first of several posts within the State Division of Housing and Community Renewal. Shepard was the public relations director for the 1984 Jesse Jackson presidential campaign and in the late 1980s she was elected the Democratic Assembly District Leader for West Harlem. She became involved in activism about environmental protection and health policy for those with a low income and people of color at a grassroots level and subsequently nationally.

On Martin Luther King Day in January 1988, Shepard was one of seven people, including Chuck Sutton, David Paterson and Hilton Clarke arrested for holding up traffic to protest sewage polluting the local river system. She, along with Sutton and Vernice Miller-Travis co-founded WE ACT the same year to campaign for environmental health and justice for the Northern Manhattan community. The actions were ultimately successful in having sewage treatment quality improved.

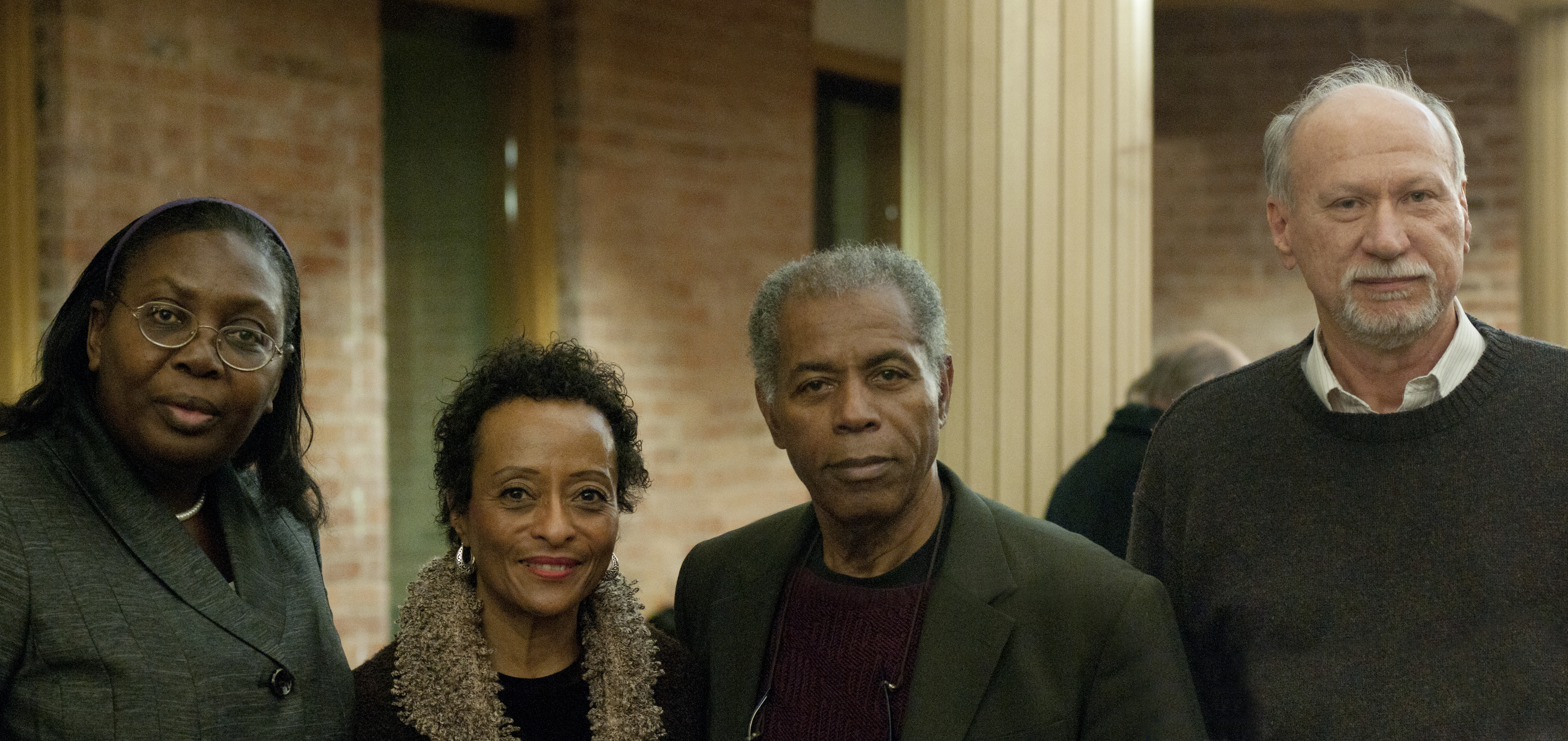
Dorceta Taylor, Peggy Shepard, Bunyan Bryant, and Paul Mohai at in 2012 at SEAS at the University of Michigan

She is a board member of the New York League of Conservation Voters as of 2020. In 2020 Shepard was appointed to chair New York's Environmental Justice Advisory Board. In 2021 she was appointed a member of the White House Environmental Justice Advisory Council.

== Publications ==
Shepard has been involved in studies of urban environmental quality and public awareness, particularly using community-based participatory research methods and is co-author of several scientific publications. These include:

- Shmool JL, Kubzansky LD, Dotson Newman O, Spengler J, Shepard P, Clougherty JE. "Social stressors and air pollution across New York City communities: A spatial approach for assessing correlations among multiple exposures." Environmental health: a global access science source. Nov 6 2014;13(1):91.
- Shepard PM, Northridge ME, Prakash S, Stover G. "Advancing environmental justice through community-based participatory research." Environmental Health Perspectives. 2002;110(Suppl 2):139–140.
- Kinney PL, Aggarwal M, Northridge ME, Janssen NA, Shepard P. A"irborne concentrations of PM(2.5) and diesel exhaust particles on Harlem sidewalks: A community-based pilot study. Environ Health Perspect. 2000;108(3):213–218.
- Northridge ME, Shepard PM. "Environmental racism and public health." American Journal of Public Health. May 1997;87(5):730–732.
- Shepard PM. "Issues of Community Empowerment." Fordham Urban Law Journal. 1994;21.

She has become known internationally, as well as nationally, for her work for all communities to have the right to a clean, healthy, and sustainable environment, including the intersection of racism with this right. In 2022, Shepard spoke at a TED conference about the way that non-white communities often have to live with more pollution because industry does not meet air, water, and soil pollution emission requirements, and what is being done to address this.

== Awards ==
She has been awarded the Jane Jacobs Medal from the Rockefeller Foundation for Lifetime Achievement in 2008, the 10th Annual Heinz Award For the Environment in 2004, the Dean's Distinguished Service Award from the Columbia Mailman School of Public Health, and Honorary Doctorates from Smith College in 2010 and Appleton, Wisconsin's Lawrence University.

In 2021, she was made a Knight of the French National Order of Merit.

== Personal life ==
She gained a BA degree from Howard University.

== Legacy ==
Since 2020-2021, the Peggy Shepherd Environmental Justice Award has been made by New York University to one or more of its environmental studies or animal studies students whose work advances diversity in their field of study.
