= Andrew Strelka =

American attorney

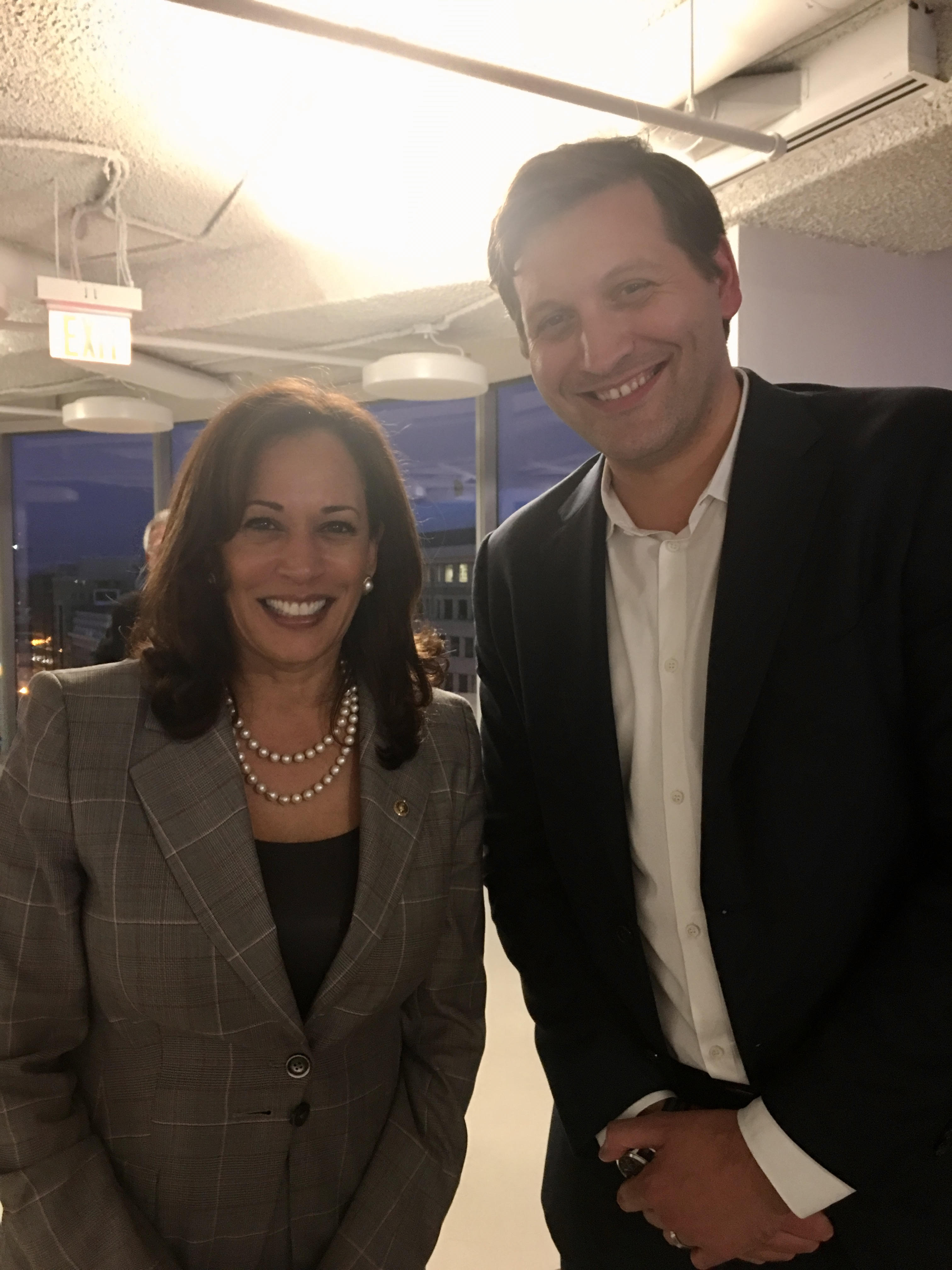
- Strelka with then U.S. Senator Kamala Harris in 2017

White House Senior Tax Counsel
- In office January 20, 2021 – July 31, 2021
- President: Joe Biden
- Leader: Dana Remus

Personal details
- Born: Virginia, U.S.
- Political party: Democratic
- Education: University of Virginia (BA); Washington College of Law (JD); Georgetown University Law Center (LLM)

Andrew Strelka is an American attorney who served as the Senior Tax Counsel in the Biden-Harris White House. During the Obama administration, he served at the Internal Revenue Service and United States Department of Justice Tax Division where he was detailed to the White House Counsel’s Office. On September 8, 2021, it was announced that Strelka had returned to his prior law firm, Latham & Watkins.

== Early life and education ==
Andrew Strelka was born in Virginia and raised in Roanoke County. His father was an orthopedic surgeon and had a medical practice in Blacksburg, Virginia. His father continued to practice medicine and perform surgery despite suffering a spinal cord injury and becoming paralyzed while moving a patient onto an operating table in 1982.

Strelka’s father pled guilty to federal tax crimes in 1994. After entering an agreement to pay off his debt to the IRS, his father was sentenced to probation by then-District Court Judge Sonia Sotomayor. Strelka has stated that his father took responsibility and that Justice Sotomayor “took the time to understand the person in her courtroom,” and credits her compassionate handling of his father’s case with shaping his view of the law and making him want to pursue public service.

Andrew Strelka earned a Bachelor of Arts in economics from the University of Virginia in 2002. He earned his Juris Doctor from American University's Washington College of Law in 2008 and a Master of Laws from Georgetown University Law Center in 2010. Strelka's identical twin brother, Thomas Strelka, is a civil rights attorney in Roanoke, Virginia.

== Career ==
In 2008, Strelka began his legal career at the Internal Revenue Service through the Presidential Management Fellows Program. Strelka was subsequently detailed to the office of the United States Attorney for the District of Columbia in 2009. In 2010, Strelka joined the United States Department of Justice Tax Division through the Attorney General’s Honors Program. While at the DOJ Tax Division, Strelka was named national chair of the tax section of the Federal Bar Association and received the Federal Bar Association’s Younger Federal Lawyer Award. In 2013, Strelka received the Tax Division's Outstanding Attorney Award and was detailed to the Obama White House. In 2014, Strelka left the government and eventually joined the tax controversy group at Latham & Watkins. In 2020, Strelka left the law firm and served as tax counsel to the Biden-Harris Transition. On January 20, 2021, Strelka assumed the role of Senior Tax Counsel in the Biden-Harris White House.

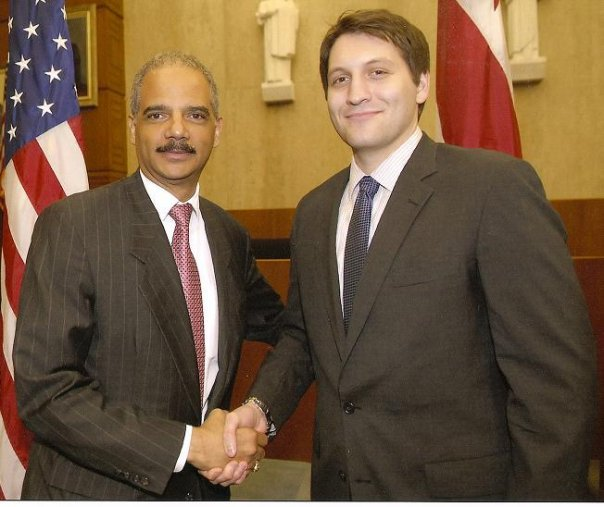
U.S. Attorney General Eric Holder and Andrew Strelka in 2009.

On September 8, 2021, Strelka returned to Latham & Watkins.

== Works ==
- Kevin Kenworthy, Kathryn Morrison Sneade, and Andrew Strelka. Transfer Pricing: Document Requests and Summons Enforcement. Bloomberg Tax and Accounting (2019). ISBN 1633592847
