= New York League of Conservation Voters =

Environmental political organization in New York State

- Abbreviation: NYLCV
- Founded: 1989; 37 years ago
- Type: 501(c)(4) social welfare organization
- Tax ID no.: 11-3095033
- Purpose: Environmental policy, political endorsements
- Location: 30 Broad Street, 30th Floor, New York City, New York, U.S.
- Key people: Julie Tighe (President)
- Affiliations: League of Conservation Voters
- Budget: $2.79 million (FY 2024)
- Website: nylcv.org

The New York League of Conservation Voters (NYLCV) is a nonprofit, nonpartisan environmental political organization in New York State. Founded in 1989 as the New York affiliate of the national League of Conservation Voters, it works to advance environmental policy through legislative scorecards, political endorsements, and electoral support for pro-environment candidates. NYLCV describes itself as the only nonpartisan, statewide environmental organization in New York that engages in electoral politics.

In 1993, NYLCV established the New York League of Conservation Voters Education Fund (NYLCVEF), a 501(c)(3) affiliate focused on public education, civic engagement, and community-level environmental programs.

== Activities ==
=== Environmental Scorecard ===
Each year following the close of the state legislative session, NYLCV publishes a State Environmental Scorecard that rates every member of the New York State Senate and New York State Assembly based on their votes and co-sponsorships on a set of priority environmental bills identified in consultation with partner organizations. Bills that reached the floor are scored on the member's vote; those that did not are scored on co-sponsorship. The organization also publishes a separate New York City Council Environmental Scorecard.

The scorecards consistently reveal geographic disparities. In the 2024 State scorecard, Westchester senators averaged 100 percent and New York City senators averaged 97 percent, while North Country representatives averaged 38 percent. In the 2025 session, 15 senators and 29 assembly members earned perfect scores of 100 percent.

In 2026, NYLCV and Environmental Advocates NY jointly introduced "Superbills"—priority legislation more heavily weighted in their annual scorecards—including the Lead Pipe Replacement Act, the Beauty Justice Act, and the Packaging Reduction and Recycling Infrastructure Act.

=== Endorsements and elections ===
NYLCV endorses candidates based on scorecard records, candidate questionnaires, and interviews conducted by regional boards. The organization's political action committee, NYLCV Gives Green, provides direct financial support to endorsed candidates. In the 2024 general election, 92 percent of NYLCV-endorsed candidates won their races. In 2025, endorsed candidates won or led in 92 percent of general election contests.

=== Policy advocacy ===
NYLCV has campaigned for several major New York environmental laws:

- Climate Leadership and Community Protection Act (2019): NYLCV advocated for passage of the law, which commits New York to 100 percent zero-emission electricity by 2040 and economy-wide net-zero emissions by 2050, with a mandate that 40 percent of climate and energy funding be invested in disadvantaged communities.
- Environmental Rights Amendment (2021): NYLCV supported Proposal 2, which amended the New York State Constitution to declare that "each person shall have the right to clean air and water, and a healthful environment." Voters approved the measure overwhelmingly.
- Environmental Bond Act (2022): NYLCV helped lead the "Vote Yes for Clean Water and Jobs Coalition" in support of the $4.2 billion Clean Water, Clean Air, and Green Jobs Bond Act, which voters approved.
- Congestion pricing: NYLCV was a vocal advocate within the Fix Our Transit Coalition. One year after the nation's first congestion pricing program launched in New York City, the organization reported reductions in traffic, faster bus service, and improved air quality.

== Organization ==
=== Leadership ===
Julie Tighe has served as president of NYLCV and NYLCVEF since October 1, 2018, succeeding Marcia Bystryn, who led the organization for nearly 20 years. Before joining NYLCV, Tighe served for more than eleven years at the New York State Department of Environmental Conservation, rising to chief of staff after serving as assistant commissioner of intergovernmental and legislative affairs. At DEC, she was a primary negotiator for the $2.5 billion Clean Water Infrastructure Act.

The NYLCV board of directors is chaired by Jon Robert Del Giorno, with co-vice chairs Evan Mason, Gail S. Port, and Peggy Shepard, who is also co-founder and executive director of WE ACT for Environmental Justice.

=== Regional chapters ===
NYLCV maintains regional chapter boards across the state, including chapters for New York City, Long Island, Westchester, the Capital Region, and Central and Western New York.

== Education Fund ==
The New York League of Conservation Voters Education Fund (NYLCVEF), a 501(c)(3) organization established in 1993, conducts nonpartisan public education and civic engagement programs. Its initiatives include the Climate Smart Communities program, which provides technical support to municipalities pursuing climate action, and voter awareness campaigns such as the 2024 "Our Vote is Our Power" campaign, which reached approximately 35,000 voters and collected nearly 3,000 pledges to vote.

== See also ==
- League of Conservation Voters
- Climate Leadership and Community Protection Act
- Environmental Advocates of New York
