= Jalonne White-Newsome =

American program officer and lecturer

- Born: Detroit, Michigan, U.S.

Academic background
- Education: Northwestern University (Bachelor's 1999); Southern Methodist University (Master's 2003); University of Michigan (Ph.D. 2011)

Academic work
- Discipline: Environmental justice

Jalonne White-Newsome is a program officer and lecturer. She is an advocate for environmental justice.

== Early life ==
Jalonne White-Newsome is from Detroit, Michigan.

== Education and career ==
In 1999, White-Newsome earned her bachelor's degree in chemical engineering from Northwestern University. After graduation, she worked as a project engineer at U.S. Gypsum. She returned to school, and in 2003, earned her master's in environmental engineering from Southern Methodist University.

Before returning to Michigan, White-Newsome worked for the Maryland Department of the Environment. She moved to Michigan with her husband, and, during maternity leave from her position with a local startup, she applied to graduate school.

In 2011, she earned her Ph.D. in environmental health sciences from the University of Michigan School of Public Health. She wrote her dissertation on exposures, vulnerability, and behaviors during heat waves.

White-Newsome worked at the community-based advocacy group West Harlem Environmental Action, Inc. (WE ACT for Environmental Justice). She served as director of federal policy in their newly opened Washington, D.C. office.

White-Newsome was the first post-doctoral Kendall Fellow in Climate Change and Public Health with the Union of Concerned Scientists.

As a program officer at the Kresge Foundation, where she began working in 2016, White-Newsome oversees a portfolio of grants on Climate Resilient & Equitable Water Systems.

White-Newsome served on the American Society for Landscape Architecture Blue Ribbon Panel on Climate Change and Resilience. The Panel delivered their findings and recommendations in the report Smart Policies for a Changing Climate.

White-Newsome is a lecturer at the Milliken Institute School of Public Health, George Washington University.

In 2022 White-Newsome was named the Senior Director for Environmental Justice at the White House.

=== Research ===
Jalonne White-Newsome conducts research on the intersection of environment and health, especially climate change and health equity. Her work is aimed at improving our understanding of how communities adapt to extreme heat events.

White-Newsome advocates for equitable and just environmental policy. She has briefed members of Congress on her work and related research, specifically discussion the ways in which African Americans, Latinos, Asian Pacific Islanders, and Native Americans are exposed to higher levels of air pollution.

== Awards and honors ==
Federal Chief Environmental Justice Officer at The White House Council on Environmental Quality (CEQ)

Senior Director for Environmental Justice at the White House

White-Newsome was appointed to the National Academy of Sciences Board on Environmental Change and Society from 2017 to 2022.

In 2017, she was appointed Michigan League of Conservation Voters' Advocate of the Year.

White-Newsome received The Environmental Management Association's Environmental Achievement Award in 2019.

She received the Kingdom Living Temple “Friends of the Environment Award” in 2017.

White-Newsome received “The Clean Power Plan Enforcer” by Grist Magazine in 2016.

== Bibliography ==
- Conlon, K. C., Rajkovich, N. B., White-Newsome, J. L., Larsen, L., & O'Neill, M. S. (2011). Preventing cold-related morbidity and mortality in a changing climate. Maturitas, 69(3), 197–202. https://doi.org/10.1016/j.maturitas.2011.04.004
- White-Newsome, J. L., Sánchez, B. N., Parker, E. A., Dvonch, J. T., Zhang, Z., & O'Neill, M. S. (2011). Assessing heat-adaptive behaviors among older, urban-dwelling adults. Maturitas, 70(1), 85–91. https://doi.org/10.1016/j.maturitas.2011.06.015
- Zhang, K., Oswald, E. M., Brown, D. G., Brines, S. J., Gronlund, C. J., White-Newsome, J. L., Rood, R. B., & O'Neill, M. S. (2011). Geostatistical exploration of spatial variation of summertime temperatures in the Detroit metropolitan region. Environmental research, 111(8), 1046–1053. https://doi.org/10.1016/j.envres.2011.08.012
- White-Newsome, J. L., Sánchez, B. N., Jolliet, O., Zhang, Z., Parker, E. A., Dvonch, J. T., & O'Neill, M. S. (2012). Climate change and health: indoor heat exposure in vulnerable populations. Environmental research, 112, 20–27. https://doi.org/10.1016/j.envres.2011.10.008
- White-Newsome, J. L., Meadows, P., & Kabel, C. (2018). Bridging Climate, Health, and Equity: A Growing Imperative. American Journal of Public Health (1971), 108(S2), S72–S73. https://doi.org/10.2105/AJPH.2017.304133
- White-Newsome, J. L. (2021). A Climate Equity Agenda Informed by Community Brilliance. Issues in Science and Technology, 38(1), 47–50.
