= Carletta Tilousi =

Havasupai activist and diplomat

- Born: 1970 or 1971 (age 54–55); Supai, Arizona, U.S.
- Occupation: Activist

Carletta Tilousi (born 1970 or 1971) is a Havasupai activist and tribal diplomat best known for her advocacy for the protection of the Grand Canyon. She is a former member of the Havasupai Tribal Council and is the President of Red Rock Foundation, Inc., a Native American non-profit organization. In 2021, President Joe Biden appointed her as one of the twenty-six members of the White House Environmental Justice Advisory Council.

== Biography ==
Carletta Tilousi was born and raised in Supai, Arizona. She graduated with a Bachelor of Science degree in Justice Studies from Arizona State University in 2001. As a member of the Havasupai Tribal Council, she served as an ambassador by presenting the tribe's environmental issues to the world, particularly regarding the development of uranium mines on tribal land. Her international diplomacy includes the World Uranium Hearing in Salzburg, Austria, the Earth Summit in Rio de Janeiro, Brazil, and the United Nations in Geneva, Switzerland. In 2010, Tilousi and her tribe won a lawsuit against Arizona State University after blood samples they had donated for type 2 diabetes research were used for further research without their permission. In 2021, she was appointed as one of the twenty-six members of the White House Environmental Justice Advisory Council by President Joe Biden, and was additionally appointed to the First Things First Coconino Regional Partnership Council that same year. Tilousi was additionally a coordinator of the Grand Canyon Tribal Coalition, a tribal alliance that successfully advocated for the designation of the Baaj Nwaavjo I'tah Kukveni – Ancestral Footprints of the Grand Canyon National Monument in 2023.

In 2025, Tilousi and her daughter, Maya Tilousi-Lyttle, were the subjects of Pete McBride's documentary film Monumental Moment. The film premiered at the Telluride Film Festival in Telluride, Colorado.
