= Thomas J. Wright (American scholar) =

International relations scholar

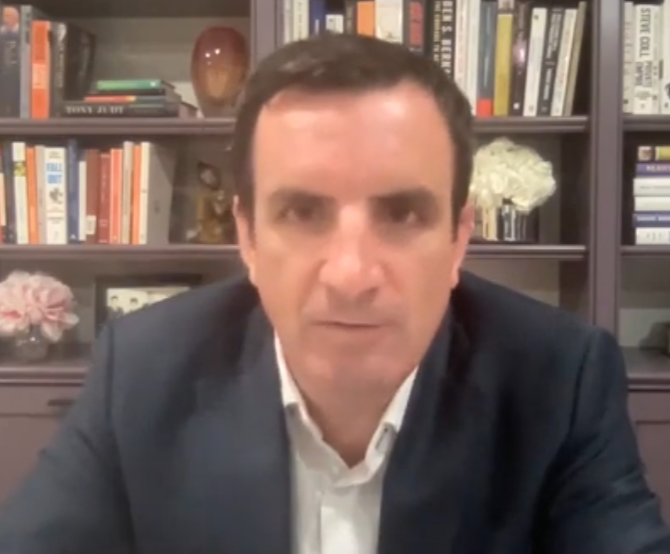
- In an online discussion in 2021
- Education: University College Dublin (BA, MA); University of Cambridge (M.Phil); Georgetown University (PhD)
- Occupation: Former Senior U.S. security official
- Employer: United States National Security Council

Thomas J. Wright is an Irish/American international relations scholar who served as Senior Director for Strategic Planning at the United States National Security Council (NSC) in the Biden administration. He was part of a team instrumental in putting together the 2022 U.S. National Security Strategy, released in October 2022.

== Education ==
Wright holds a BA in history (1996) and a MA in comparative politics (1997) from University College Dublin, a M.Phil. from University of Cambridge (1999), and a PhD in government (international relations) from Georgetown University (2007). His thesis is titled Great Power Responses to Threat Transitions and the Legitimacy Burden: U.S. Soviet Relations 1943–1950. At University College Dublin, he was the Auditor of the Literary and Historical Society for the 1998-9 Session.

== Career ==
Prior to joining the NSC, Wright was a senior fellow and director of the Center on the United States and Europe at the Brookings Institution.

Between 2008 and 2011, he was executive director of studies at the Chicago Council of Global Affairs.

Wright has served as a predoctoral fellow at Harvard's Belfer Center and a postdoctoral fellow at the Princeton Institute for International and Regional Studies. He has also taught at the University of Chicago's Harris School for Public Policy.

== Views on China and technology ==
In a December 2021 Brookings written exchange on technology's role in US-China strategic competition, Wright wrote: "Beijing is likely to continue to use its enormous economic power to build asymmetrical ties to companies and countries that serve its interests but it will struggle to provide an alternative to the U.S. model of international cooperation on technology. It would have more levers it could pull to slow down a formal alliance but it will find it difficult to undermine a more diffused approach."

== Publications ==
=== Books ===
- All Measures Short of War: The Contest for the 21st Century and the Future of American Power, Yale University Press, May 23, 2017
- Kahl, Colin; Wright, Thomas (August 24, 2021). Aftershocks: pandemic politics and the end of the old international order. New York: St. Martin's Press. ISBN 978-1-250-27574-5.

=== Articles ===
- Wright, Thomas (August 7, 2012). "Outlaw of the Sea". Foreign Affairs. ISSN 0015-7120.
- Gordon, David; Wright, Thomas (March 26, 2015). "Syriza Stumbles". Foreign Affairs. ISSN 0015-7120.
- Gordon, David; Wright, Thomas (June 30, 2015). "No Exit". Foreign Affairs. ISSN 0015-7120.
- Wright, Thomas (September 26, 2018). "Trump's Mystifying Victory Lap at the UN". The Atlantic.
- Wright, Thomas (December 21, 2018). "Trump, Unchecked". The Atlantic.
- Wright, Thomas (January 18, 2019). "Trump's Foreign Policy Is No Longer Unpredictable". Foreign Affairs. ISSN 0015-7120.
- Wright, Thomas (February 19, 2019). "The Moment the Transatlantic Charade Ended". The Atlantic.
- Wright, Thomas (February 10, 2020). "The Folly of Retrenchment". Foreign Affairs. No. March/April 2020. ISSN 0015-7120.
- Campbell, Kurt M.; Wright, Thomas (April 13, 2020). "If Biden Wins, He'll Have to Put the World Back Together". The Atlantic.
- Wright, Thomas (August 24, 2021). "The Center Cannot Hold". Foreign Affairs. No. September/October 2021. ISSN 0015-7120.

== See also ==
- List of Executive Office appointments by Joe Biden
