= Elijah McKenzie-Jackson =

British artist (born 2003)

- McKenzie-Jackson, in 2024
- Born: 28 December 2003 (age 22); London, United Kingdom
- Occupations: Artist; Author; Activist; Model
- Organization: WaicUp.org
- Known for: Participation in the School Strike for Climate
- Spouse: Jerome Foster II
- Website: https://www.elijahmckenziejackson.com

Signature
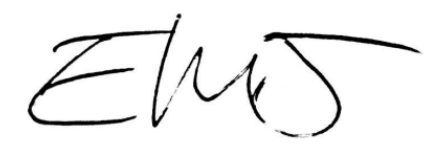

Elijah McKenzie-Jackson (born 28 December 2003) is a British visual artist, author and climate activist based in London and New York City. His paintings, installations and political artworks address climate change, LGBTQ+ rights and social justice. He co-founded the climate nonprofit Waic Up and, as a teenager, was an organizer of the Youth Strike for Climate, helping found Fridays for Future UK in February 2019. His debut book, Blue, was published in 2025.

McKenzie-Jackson uses art as a form of protest. He has organized climate protests across Europe and South America and has spoken at the Parliament of the United Kingdom, the House of Lords and the European Parliament, outside the G7 summit and in the Amazon rainforest.

== Early life and education ==
McKenzie-Jackson was born in Walthamstow, London, and lived with his maternal grandmother, Jean Young. He grew up vegetarian for animal welfare reasons and became vegan at 14, which he has said helped him understand that personal change alone cannot solve the climate crisis. He became involved in climate activism after learning about climate change at Woodbridge High School and researching the subject on his own.

"I learned a tiny bit about climate change in school. I started watching documentaries, doing my own research, and I got very frustrated. I didn't understand why no politicians were acting."

He has studied fine art and sociology in New York City since 2022.

== Art ==
McKenzie-Jackson's art focuses on climate change and on social and political issues such as gun violence. He is the founder and lead artist of EMJ Earth, a civic art studio through which he publishes his work.

"In my work, I craft large-scale art installations, paint murals, and curate exhibits that vividly depict the impacts of the climate emergency."

His first public work was the 2019 photographic self-portrait series How Would You Feel?, which depicts wildlife threatened by human activity. The series launched his career and, when he was 15, was featured in a double-page spread in GQ.

He later released his first NFT collection, The Mockery of Money Behind Destruction, three images of clowns intended to raise awareness of how oil industry revenues fuel global warming.

In 2023 he released the painting I <3 Paris, which addresses climate change and the Paris Agreement.

His sculpture There's No Place Like Home is a ruby megaphone encrusted with 17,000 Swarovski crystals. Designed as a protest tool, it contains a QR code that collects voice messages from displaced young people and queer refugees.

His solo exhibition The Ballroom Across 6th Avenue, Two Floors Up, 10:30 Sharp, a series of six oil paintings presented online with BTA Gallery, includes The President, a portrait of former U.S. President Bill Clinton. McKenzie-Jackson began the portrait from life, without a formal sitting or photographs, while observing Clinton at the Clinton Global Initiative's 20th anniversary meeting in September 2025, and finished it in his studio.

== Activism ==
McKenzie-Jackson was involved in the School Strike for Climate movement. He served as coordinator at UK Student Climate Network and an organizer at the Stop Trump Coalition. He has also served as a United Nations Togetherband ambassador.

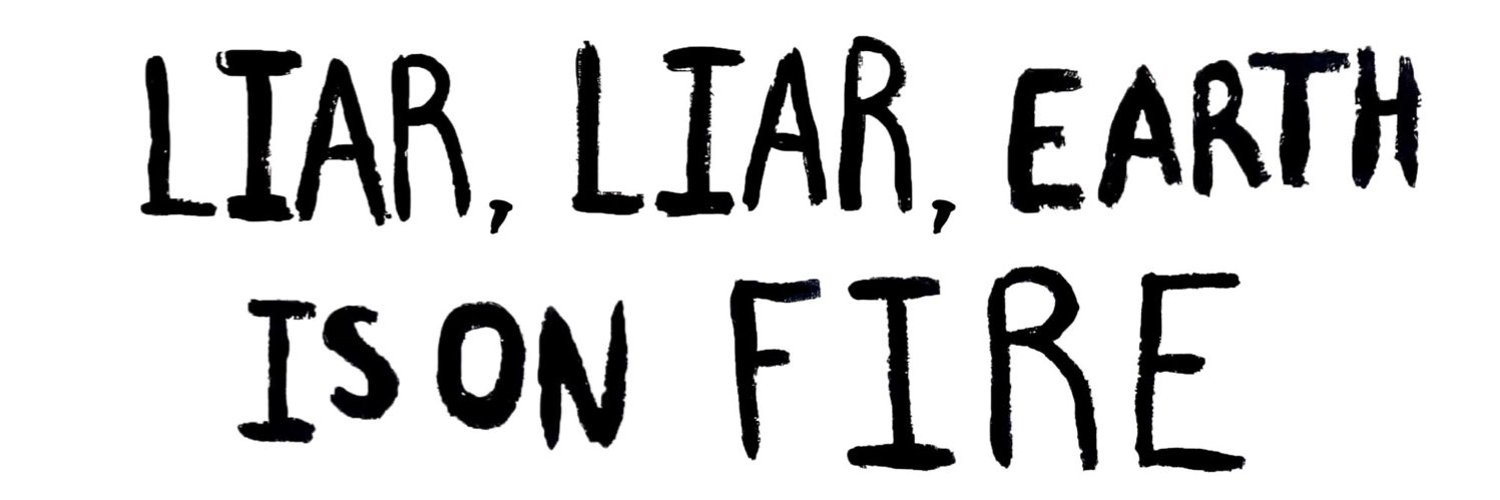
Climate Strike sign text used by Elijah McKenzie-Jackson

McKenzie-Jackson first started climate striking on February 15, 2019, in Parliament Square, London, and helped organise the 20 September 2019 London climate strike with UK Student Climate Network, breaking England's national record for the biggest environmental protest with over 100,000 demonstrators in attendance.

=== Voyage to Brazilian Amazon Rainforest ===
In November 2019, McKenzie-Jackson joined an expedition into the Amazon rainforest, where he learned about social and environmental injustice and met activists including members of Pussy Riot and Chief Raoni Metuktire.

=== Hunger strike against West Cumbria coal mine ===
In February 2020, McKenzie-Jackson went on hunger strike in protest against the UK government's plans for the country's first new deep coal mine in 30 years, in West Cumbria, saying he "won't eat until new coal mine is scrapped". He ended the strike on its tenth day, after being invited to speak with politicians at the UK Parliament about the mine. The strike prompted further protests against the project in Whitehaven. In January 2021 he began a second 10-day hunger strike and, with Coal Action Network, gathered 111,475 petition signatures calling for Robert Jenrick's decision on the mine to be reversed.

=== COP27 and LGBTQ+ rights ===
In July 2022, McKenzie-Jackson and Jerome Foster II wrote to UNFCCC Executive Secretary Patricia Espinosa urging the United Nations to move the COP27 climate summit out of Egypt, citing the country's treatment of LGBTQ+ people, women and civil rights advocates. McKenzie-Jackson is openly bisexual, and The Guardian reported that the couple might be targeted if they attended. The letter was signed by activists including Nadya Tolokonnikova, Ahmed Alaa and Eric Njuguna, and the couple called the UNFCCC's inaction "inherent discrimination."

== Personal life ==
McKenzie-Jackson has spoken about his clinically diagnosed depression due to climate grief. He stated in 2023, that art plays a critical role in the processing of his emotions and that painting is his escape.

"It is pretty depressing that young people are essentially forced to organise and lobby for a future. However, I would say I am eager to see real change and action from our so-called leaders. I'd like to see real action, following science, while treating climate change like the crisis it really is.”

McKenzie-Jackson is bisexual. He has been in a relationship with Jerome Foster II since 2021, and the two later married.

== Bibliography ==
- Blue (2025), a memoir and manifesto exploring queer identity, art, mental health and climate justice

== Filmography ==
- "Whose Future? OUR FUTURE!" Documentary, 2019
- "Conscientious Protectors: A Story of Rebellion Against Extinction" Documentary, 2022
