= Jahi Wise =

Jahi Wise is an American political advisor and climate change mitigation executive, and leader of the first U.S. national green bank. He is a longtime advocate and thought leader around new financial mechanisms for funding climate change solutions.

== White House ==
Wise served as a senior advisor to President Biden in the White House, working on Gina McCarthy's Climate Policy Office team. Wise helped lead the creation and passage of the Inflation Reduction Act, the largest climate change legislation in U.S. history, spanning novel tax vehicles and grants for U.S. clean energy manufacturers.

== First U.S. National Green Bank - $27 Billion Greenhouse Gas Reduction Fund ==
After the IRA's passage, Wise became known as "EPA's rainmaker," for his design of the first U.S. national green bank in section 60103 of the IRA, which he went on to lead.

At EPA, Wise led the creation of the bank, known as the Greenhouse Gas Reduction Fund (GGRF), doing last-mile clean energy deployments for disadvantaged communities. The GGRF was a $27 billion fund consisting of three programs: ($7B) Solar for All, ($14B) National Clean Investment Fund, and the ($6B) Clean Communities Investment Accelerator.

The GGRF was controversially repealed by President Trump and is subject to ongoing litigation.

== Personal ==
Wise is a lawyer who received his J.D. at Yale Law School and M.B.A. at the Yale SOM, and hails from Georgia.
