= Pili Tobar =

American political advisor

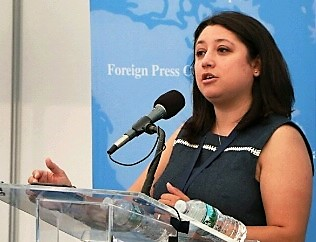

White House Deputy Communications Director
- In office January 20, 2021 – May 2022 Serving with Kate Berner
- President: Joe Biden
- Preceded by: Brian Morgenstern
- Succeeded by: Herbie Ziskend

Personal details
- Born: Florida, U.S.
- Party: Democratic
- Spouse: Christina Carr
- Education: University of Miami (BA, MPA)

Maria "Pili" del Pilar Tobar is an American political advisor who served as White House Deputy Communications Director from 2021–2022 during the Biden administration. Tobar previously worked as the deputy director of America's Voice and as an aide to Senator Chuck Schumer.

== Early life and education ==
Tobar was born in Florida and raised in Guatemala City, Guatemala. She returned to the United States in 2004, earning a Bachelor of Arts in political science and Master of Public Administration from the University of Miami.

== Career ==
After college, Tobar worked as an intern for Greenberg Quinlan Rosner Research, a market research firm based in Washington, D.C. From 2013 to 2015, she served as the director of Hispanic media for the Democratic National Committee.

In 2015, Tobar served as the communications director of the Latino Victory Project. In 2017, Tobar began serving as the Hispanic media director for Senator Chuck Schumer. She joined America's Voice in 2018 as a managing director and later became deputy director in February 2019. In July 2020, she joined the Joe Biden 2020 presidential campaign as communications director for coalitions.
