= Celeste Drake =

American union official and trade expert

Personal details
- Party: Democratic
- Education: University of California, Los Angeles (BA, MPP, JD)

Celeste Drake is an American union official and trade expert. She served in the Biden Administration as the deputy director for Labor & Economy of the National Economic Council from July 2022 to August 2023. She previously served as the 1st Made in America Director from 2021 to 2022.

== Education ==
Drake attended University of California, Los Angeles (UCLA). She received her BA in Political Science in 1989 as a Cum Laude graduate. In 1998 she returned to UCLA attending the School of Public of Affairs and was concurrently attending the UCLA School of Law working on her Juris Doctor (JD). In 2002 she graduated with a Masters of Public Policy (MPP) from the School of Public Affairs and a JD from the School of Law.

== Career ==
She was formerly head of government relations for the Directors Guild of America.

=== Congressional career ===
From August 2003 to November 2006 Drake was a Legislative Assistant to Congressman Lloyd Doggett of Texas. And from December 2006 to May 2011 she was the Legislative Director to Congresswoman Linda Sánchez of California

=== Biden Administration ===
On April 27, 2021, President Joe Biden made her the Director of Made in America at the Office of Management and Budget.

In July 2022, Drake was named as Biden's top labor advisor. She resigned in August 2023 to assume a new position as deputy director-general of the International Labour Organization.
