= Cecilia Martinez =

American political advisor

Personal details
- Born: Taos, New Mexico, U.S.
- Education: Stanford University (BA); New Mexico State University (MPA); University of Delaware (PhD)

Cecilia Martinez is an American environmental activist and the senior director for environmental justice at the Council on Environmental Quality and co-founder and executive director of the Center for Earth, Energy, and Democracy. In 2020, she was named one of Time magazine's 100 Most Influential People, nominated by New Jersey Senator Cory Booker for her work in environmental justice and climate policy. On September 5, 2020, she was announced as a member of the Advisory Board of United States President-elect Joe Biden.

== Education and early career ==
Martinez was raised in Taos, New Mexico. She credits her upbringing in the mountains as her motivation for protecting and caring for the environment. Martinez attended Stanford University where she received her Bachelor of Arts degree in political science in 1979. She then attended New Mexico State University, where she received her Master of Public Administration degree in 1982. She then continued on to the University of Delaware to pursue a doctoral degree in urban affairs and public policy, which she received in 1990.

Martinez's early research centered on nuclear energy and the effects of radiation poisoning on populations and environments. While in academia, she began working more with communities of color in environmental justice policy work. Eventually, she left academia to focus more on environmental justice organizing.

== Environmental justice advocacy ==
Martinez is recognized for her work advocating for environmental justice, centering the voices and perspectives of communities that have been most impacted by climate change and environmental pollution. She co-founded the Center for Earth, Energy, and Democracy (CEED), which launched in 2011. The organization works to provide research and analytical support to environmental justice groups and coalitions, as well as educating and empowering communities at the forefront of the environmental justice movement.

In her capacity as executive director of CEED, Martinez helped shape and launch the Equitable and Just Climate Platform in 2018, a collaboration among CEED, the Center for American Progress, and the Natural Resources Defense Council. Participants in the platform worked together to propose an agenda for environment and climate policy that centers the needs and concerns of communities that have been most affected by pollution; the agenda was subsequently published in July 2019. On the platform's anniversary in July 2020, Martinez and John Podesta co-authored a call to tackle environmental racism while addressing the health and economic impacts of the COVID-19 pandemic.

In the run up to the 2020 United States presidential election, candidate Joe Biden invited Martinez to join his Climate Engagement Advisory Council, which focused on mobilizing voters and fine-tuning Biden's climate policies. She also advised on developing his $2 trillion plan to combat climate change, which includes a commitment to invest 40% of clean energy money into communities that have been disproportionately impacted by environmental racism. In this capacity, Martinez focused on advocating for the importance of environmental justice in climate policies. After Biden was elected President of the United States, she was appointed to his transition team to lead the review of the Council on Environmental Quality and was on the shortlist to head the council after his inauguration.

== Awards and honors ==
- Time 100, 2020
- Obama White House Champion of Change, Climate Equity, 2016
