= Vernice Miller-Travis =

Environmental activist

- Other names: Vernice Miller

Vernice Miller-Travis is an environmental activist. She analyzes hazardous waste sites designated by the U.S. Environmental Protection Agency.

== Life ==
She first studied at Barnard College, and then graduated from Columbia University.

She protested against apartheid. She worked for the Natural Resource Defense Council.

She worked with the United Church of Christ on a project linking zip codes with hazardous waste sites, through this work she linked air quality in West Harlem with high rates of asthma in children.

She co-founded West Harlem Environmental Action which fought to implement conditions that would reduce fumes from the sewage treatment plant that sits under Riverbank State Park. In this project she tracked the spatial extent of fumes from an unfinished sewage treatment plant. Miller coordinated the citizens responses to the fumes from the plant, and in 1994 the group received a settlement from the city of New York in order to document health problems in the area.

She served as the Vice-Chair of the Clean Water Action Board of Directors. She co-founded We Act for Environmental Justice.

She is the Executive Vice President of the social-justice organization Metropolitan Group, and in this role she has been working to reduce funding to states that have policy that are considered racial discrimination. A portion of her work involves analyzing data on hazardous waste sites from the United States' Environmental Protection Agency to identify cases racial discrimination in an area.
