= American Climate Corps =

US national service program established in 2023

The Corps' logo

The American Climate Corps was a national service of the US government focused on climate change prevention. It was launched in September 2023 by the Biden administration, and is a government interagency project between the National Oceanic and Atmospheric Administration and the Departments of Labor, Interior, Agriculture, Energy, and AmeriCorps. The service planned to recruit 20,000 young people, and train them for public service or the private sector. On January 20th, 2025, President Trump canceled the Climate Corps via executive order:

All activities, programs, and operations associated with the American Climate Corps, including actions taken by any agency shall be terminated immediately. Within one day of the date of this order, the Secretary of the Interior shall submit a letter to all parties to the 'American Climate Corps Memorandum of Understanding' dated December 2023 to terminate the memorandum, and the head of each party to the memorandum shall agree to the termination in writing.

== Forest Corps ==
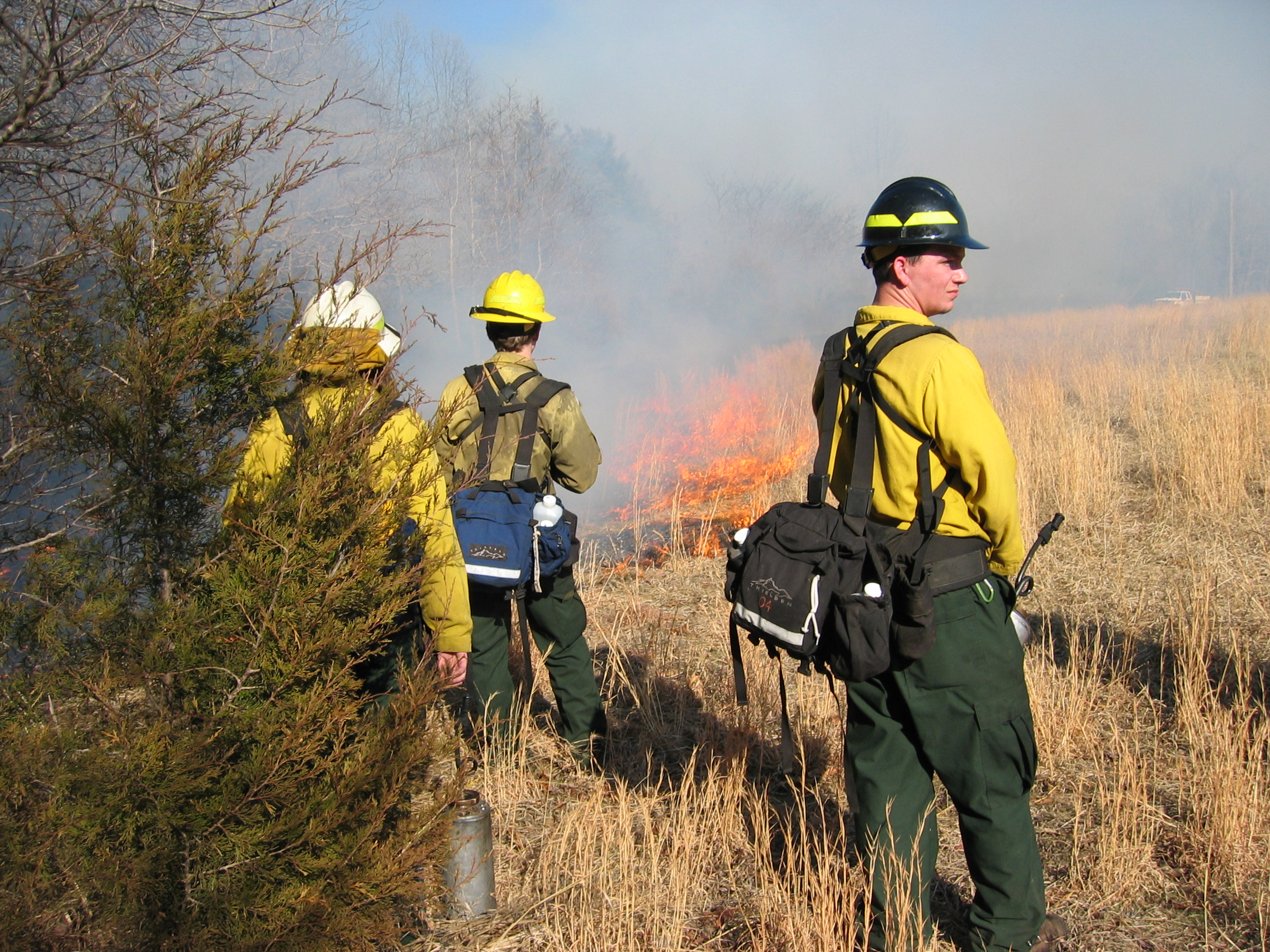
A prescribed burn on federal land

The Climate Corps got a 5-year, $15 million partnership through the US Forest Service for establishing a Forest Corps with a highest priority of confronting the wildfire crisis in 2023. At the time, the Forest Corps planned to employ 80 people aged 18–26 beginning in the summer of 2024. These positions, requiring no prior education or experience, promised to pay a compensation package of lodging, transportation, clothing, a living allowance, and health benefits equivalent to $15 per hour.

== Career skills training program ==
The United States Department of Energy allocated $10 million in grants to support classroom instruction and on-the-job training for individuals seeking industry-related certifications in energy efficient building technologies in 2023. Grant applicants were ask to submit a community benefits plan explaining how the proposal would contribute to local community and labor support, workforce development, diversity, equity, inclusion, and initiatives for economic and environmental justice.

== Initial operation and further expansion ==
Building from the existence and success of other climate corps programs such as SEI's Climate Corps and California Climate Action Corp, the American Climate Corps was expected to begin functioning in April 2024 with several hundred members. The tasks were not defined precisely, but were said to "likely include things like installing solar panels, restoring vulnerable habitats, and fire hazard prevention."

The needed skills differed depending on the task: some tasks would need only "skills like communications, conflict resolution, teamwork, critical thinking, problem-solving, reliability," while others would require higher education.

According to the Biden administration, in the first year the number of participants was expected to be 20,000, with 50,000 more added each year by 2031. However, this plan was strongly opposed by Republicans.

On Earth Day 2024, in Prince William Forest Park created by the Civilian Conservation Corps, Biden officially launched the corps' website, in which people could apply for the available jobs. 2,000 jobs were already available when the declaration was made. More than 42,000 people expressed interest in participating.

The first class of members was sworn in, in mid June 2024. By the end of that month, the number of members in place were expected to reach 9,000.

== See also ==
- Peace Corps
