= West Harlem Environmental Action =

US environmental justice organization

- Formation: March 1988; 38 years ago
- Founder: Peggy Shepard; Vernice Miller-Travis; Chuck Sutton
- Tax ID no.: 13-3800068
- Purpose: Environmental Justice
- Website: https://www.weact.org

WE ACT for Environmental Justice (formerly known as West Harlem Environmental Action) is a nonprofit environmental justice organization based in Harlem, Manhattan, New York City. The organization was founded in March 1988 to mobilize community opposition to the city's operation of the North River Sewage Treatment Plant, and the siting of the sixth bus depot in Northern Manhattan.

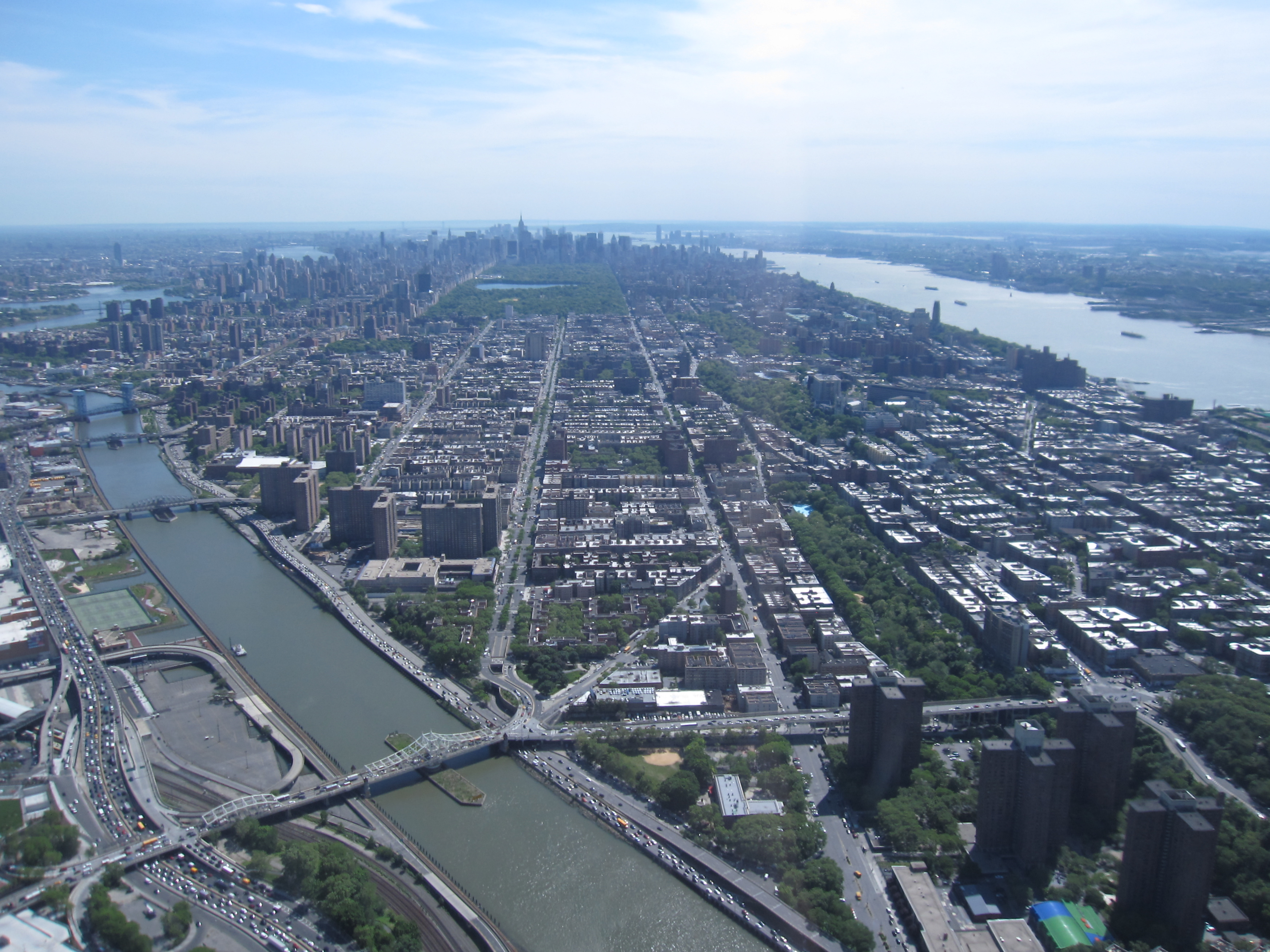
Bird's Eye view of Harlem, New York City

WE ACT is dedicated to fighting environmental justice issues in the Northern Manhattan community. The organization focuses on urban quality of life issues such as climate justice, clean air, access to good jobs, public health, pollution, and sustainable and equitable land use. It works through citizen empowerment, lobbying, litigation, education, and community outreach to accomplish its goals.

Currently, WE ACT is one of several groups engaged in negotiations for a Community Benefits Agreement with Columbia University as part of the school's Manhattanville expansion plan. It is also renovating an abandoned brownstone for conversion into the WE ACT Environmental Justice Center, which will house office and program space as well as serve as a demonstration of various green building technologies.

== History and organization ==
In April 1986, the North River Sewage Treatment Plant began its operations on eight blocks of riverside property in West Harlem, Manhattan. Soon after its opening, local residents from the predominantly African American and Latino neighborhood complained of noxious odors emitting from the plant and increased exposures to health hazards. Peggy Shepard, a local resident, who was elected as a political district leader in 1985, pressured local and state authorities to perform a study on the health effects of exposure to the treatment plant's emissions. The study found that the fumes may cause respiratory problems at high levels of exposure, triggering public backlash from West Harlem residents, demanding repairs be made on the facility.

In 1988 the Metropolitan Transportation Authority (MTA) attempted to construct a second bus depot in West Harlem, adjacent to an intermediary school. The MTA was met with strong community opposition, in the form of protests, lawsuits, and scientific research.

During this period, the attention and discontent surrounding the operation of the North River Sewage Treatment Plant and the construction of a second bus depot in West Harlem, presented the need for a unified movement to address the unequal impact of environmental hazards on the minority community. Therefore, in March 1988 Peggy Shepard, Vernice Miller-Travis, and Chuck Sutton launched WE ACT to "institutionalize resources in the community" to build and educate a community dedicated to fighting environmental injustice and improving environmental health.

WE ACT emphasizes the importance of citizen involvement in its campaigns and partnerships. It utilizes community-based participatory research to address environmental justice issues and improve the environmental health and quality of life of the Northern Manhattan community. WE ACT strives to educate community members and raise public awareness on issues effecting the health and quality of life of the community.

== Early work ==
=== North River Sewage Treatment Plant ===
The construction of the North River Sewage Treatment Plant, was initially proposed in 1955 for a site along the Hudson River at 72nd Street, a primarily white and affluent community; however, the original site was rejected due to objections from Robert Moses - the powerful NYC Parks Commissioner, and the Triborough Bridge and Tunnel Authority Administrator. who rejected the 72nd Street site because of its proximity to his preposed West Side Improvement Plan which would eventually house the Metropolitan Opera, the NYC Ballet, Avery Fisher Music Hall, and the new home of the Juilliard School of Music. Thus, the chosen site became the Hudson River waterfront from West 137th Street to West 145th Street in West Harlem, at the time a historic, middle class, predominantly African-American community. Local residents were outraged when it was revealed in 1968, that the North River plant would be sited, constructed and operated in the midst of their community, concerned it would create pollution problems and adversely impact their community. Despite community resistance, construction of the plant started in 1972 and was completed in 1985. When the plant began its operations in 1986, community members further voiced their concerns over noxious odors emanating from the plant effecting an area of almost two square miles. Local residents remained indoors to escape the fumes, partly due to their fear of developing adverse health effects resulting from exposure to the fumes. A study by the New York Department of Energy Conservation (DEC), found the plant's emissions contained hydrogen sulfide levels 28% higher than the standard. Community discontent shifted into activism and in 1988 on Martin Luther King Day, WE ACT co-founders Peggy Shepard and Chuck Sutton, along with five others were arrested for blocking traffic on the West Side Highway around the treatment facility, and co-founder Vernice D. Miller and several other residents blocked traffic on nearby Riverside Drive as acts of protest against the poor operation and management of the plant.

Due to a lawsuit filed by We ACT in partnership with the Natural Resources Defense Council, and resistance from West Harlem residents, city officials began to address the plant's operating issues in 1991, and identified that the lack of any odor control systems as a fundamental design flaw that was causing the excess air pollution. After a prolonged court battle with the city and the Department of Environmental Protection (DEP), WE ACT came to a legal settlement regarding the poor operations of the sewage plant in December 1993 with the administration of Mayor David Dinkins. As a result, $1.1 million was set aside in a fund for communal environmental initiatives in West Harlem and WE ACT was made "a monitor of the city's $55 million consent agreement to fix the plant".

In an act of appeasement to the West Harlem community in 1968-1970, the state of New York agreed to construct a 28-acre state park known as the Riverbank State Park on top of the sewage plant. It opened to the public with great fanfare over Memorial Day weekend in 1993. However, fumes and odors continued to seep out of the plant affecting local neighborhoods.

Today the North River Sewage Treatment Plant is continuing to improve their facility and upgrade to meet higher air quality standards. In their most recent endeavors the facility has installed new duct work and fans to optimize odor control and reported air issues.

=== Dirty Diesel ===
Northern Manhattan is home to one-third of "the largest diesel bus fleet (4,000 vehicles) in the country" operated by the MTA. WE ACT deemed the high concentration of bus depots had negative impacts on air quality and the subsequent health of Northern Manhattan community members. The organization associated the high rates of asthma in Northern Manhattan with concentrated levels of particulate matter (PM), an air pollutant released during diesel fuel combustion, emanating from the bus depots, major transportation routes, and heavy traffic throughout West Harlem. WE ACT also organized a media campaign, The Clean Fuel--Clean Air--Good Health Diesel Bus Campaign, to raise public awareness on the risks associated with diesel exhaust and its ability to trigger asthma attacks. While it failed to influence the MTA to change its policies in favor of cleaner fuel alternatives, the campaign garnered a large amount of public support and attention, demonstrating the power of public media and community outreach.

In November 2000, WE ACT, filed a complaint with the U.S. Department of Transportation (USDOT) claiming that bus depots were disproportionately located in minority communities in Northern Manhattan, which houses six of the eight total bus depots in Manhattan, thus elevating the health risks associated with high exposure to harmful diesel exhaust.

The USDOT found that the MTA violated Title IV of the Civil Rights Act of 1964 and failed to meet the federal environmental impact analysis involving the construction, rehabilitation, and operation of bus depots and other facilities. This campaign led to the MTA's modification of bus depots and investment in clean-fuel buses, as well as increased public awareness pertaining to the dangers of fuel fumes and poor air quality.

== Mission ==
WE ACT states its mission is "to build healthy communities by ensuring that people of color and/or low income residents participate meaningfully in the creation of sound and fair environmental health and protection policies and practices." The organization serves as an "educational resource" to galvanize citizen participation and activism on matters of "environmental health and quality of life issues".

== Environmental justice ==
=== Asthma ===
In the United States the number of people suffering from Asthma has grown steadily every year. Healthcare professionals have referred to the alarming rise in asthma cases as "a new epidemic". The respiratory disease is characterized by chronic lung inflammation and episodes of airway constriction. While there is uncertainty on the exact cause of the disease, it is believed that "genetic and environmental factors interact to cause asthma, most often early in life". Recently, the focus has turned to the impact of environmental conditions, most notably the exposure to indoor and outdoor air pollutants or allergens. WE ACT states that a racial divide exists in air pollution, resulting in the disproportionate exposure of minority or low income communities to high levels of air pollutants. WE ACT works to improve the air quality of Northern Manhattan communities and reduce the incidence of asthma and other respiratory problems by addressing the sources and environmental risks producing harmful air pollutants.

WE ACT focuses on asthma or clean air as one of its primary areas of concern, because of exceptionally high rates of asthma found in Northern Manhattan. The organization highlights the connection between environmental risks in the predominantly Latino and African-American neighborhoods, such as the disproportionate exposure to diesel exhaust and the ubiquitous odors from municipal facilities, and the highest asthma mortality and morbidity rates in New York. WE ACT the challenges the city and state to recognize and address air quality problems. Currently WE ACT, is collaborating with several community-based environmental organizations, such as the Deep South Center for Environmental Justice (DSCEJ), Green Door Initiative (GDI), and Jesus People Against Pollution (JPAP), on the National Asthma Disparities Project. The project aims to study the disparities in asthma treatment across four different communities in the United States, by assessing the effectiveness of the Environmental Protection Agency's (EPA) Coordinated Federal Action Plan to Reduce Racial and Ethnic Asthma Disparities (Action Plan). The Action Plan was introduced in May 2012, to review federal efforts addressing asthma issues and develop a more effective collaboration among federal programs.

== Partnerships ==
=== Community Outreach and Engagement Core (COEC) ===
The Community Outreach and Engagement Core (COEC) is a collaborative program between the NIEHS Center for Environmental Health in Northern Manhattan, WE ACT, and other community stakeholders, working to understand and prevent the environmental aspects of diseases such as Parkinson's, Cancer, Asthma, and ALS through policy and legislation. The operations of the COEC focus on four Northern Manhattan communities: Central Harlem, West Harlem, Washington Heights, and Inwood. Other members of the program include organizations within a close proximity to Northern Manhattan, such as The Columbia Center for Children's Environmental Health (CCCEH) of Columbia University, The Harlem Center for Health Promotion and Disease Prevention, and the Harlem Hospital Center. One of the biggest accomplishments of COEC and WE ACT is the development of an Environmental Health Report Card. The report card assigns a grade to New York City communities based on measurements of indoor/outdoor air quality, recreational water quality, solid waste, open space, and the availability of healthy food. By communicating scientific and health research findings through initiatives such as family events and fairs, conferences, forums, and the Environmental Health Report Card, the COEC members seek to increase community awareness of environmental dangers and establish a consistent local involvement in environmental issues.

WE ACT's involvement in Northern Manhattan communities allows COEC members to acquire information about local environmental health concerns. In turn, WE ACT acts as a bridge for the passing of information between research groups and low-income communities in Northern Manhattan.

=== Faith Leaders for Environmental Justice ===
WE ACT has collaborated with members of diverse Northern Manhattan churches in an effort to raise public awareness of environmental issues. The goal of the partnership is to encourage people of faith to care about environmental issues and to educate religious figures so that they can inspire environmental justice activism throughout diverse communities that, traditionally, have not engaged in environmental justice issues. Faith Leaders for Environmental Justice focuses on three key points: Climate Justice, Food Justice, and Energy Consumption. The Climate Justice work group seeks to promote awareness surrounding the dangers of climate change and the behavioral alterations that can be made to mitigate the effects. In coordination with the Energy Consumption work group, one of the main points of the Climate Justice group is to teach people how to reduce their energy consumption and carbon emissions. The Food Justice work group aims to educate people about the barriers to healthy eating and the importance of purchasing healthy food, while bringing healthful food initiatives to low-income communities. Some of these initiatives include Community Sponsored Agriculture (CSA) projects, community and rooftop gardens, food drives, and food stamp outreach.

=== Healthy Home Healthy Child Campaign ===
The Healthy Homes Project is a joint research initiative between the Columbia University Center for Children's Environmental Health (CCCEH). The project targets the unequal exposure of environmental hazards faced by children in minority or low-income communities and works to educate families on a number of known risk factors such as "cigarettes, lead poisoning, drugs and alcohol, air pollution, garbage, pesticides, and poor nutrition". Educating parents on environmental health risks, can protect children from developing asthma or cancer or from experiencing growth or developmental delays, among others.
