= Ashley Deeks =

American legal scholar

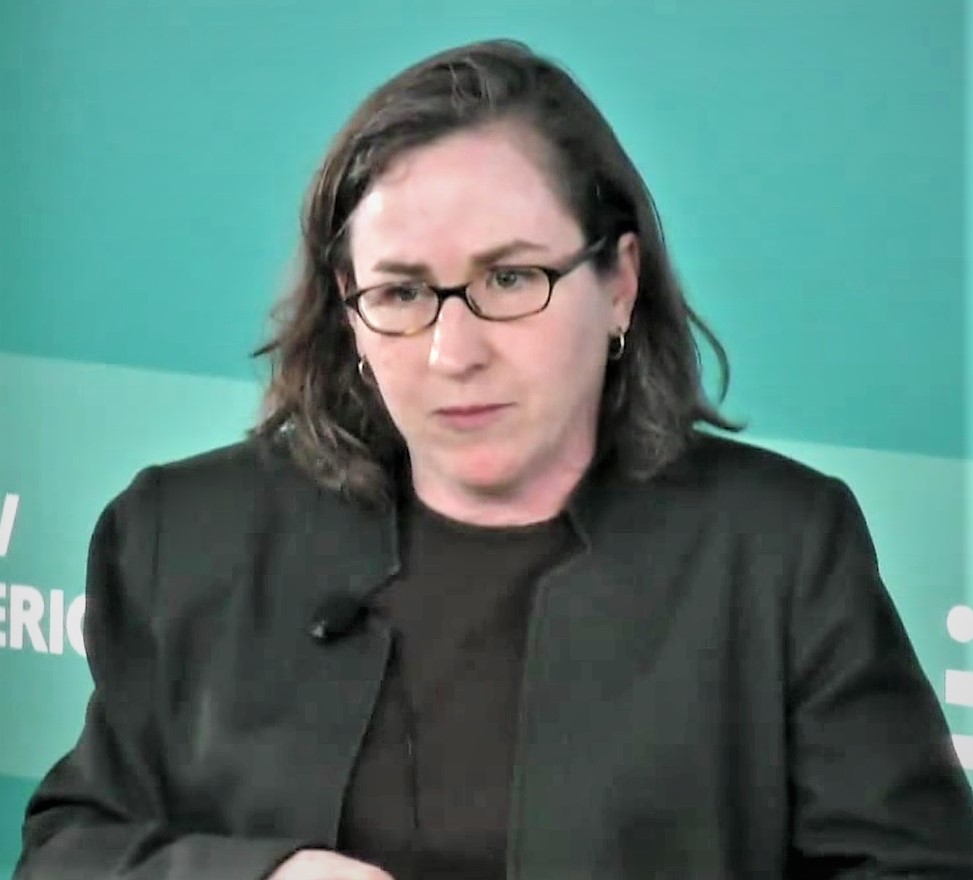

Personal details
- Education: Williams College (BA); University of Chicago (JD)

Academic work
- Discipline: Law
- Sub-discipline: National security law International law
- Institutions: Columbia Law School; University of Virginia

Ashley S. Deeks is an American legal scholar who served as an associate White House Counsel and deputy legal adviser to the U.S. National Security Council in the Biden administration. She is also the E. James Kelly, Jr.–Class of 1965 Research Professor of Law at the University of Virginia School of Law. She is an expert on national security law.

== Education ==
Deeks earned a Bachelor of Arts degree in art from Williams College 1993 and a J.D. from the University of Chicago Law School, where she served as comment editor on the University of Chicago Law Review.

== Career ==
After graduating from law school, Deeks clerked for Judge Edward R. Becker on the U.S. Court of Appeals for the Third Circuit. She worked at the U.S. State Department in its Office of Legal Adviser as an assistant legal adviser on political-military affairs, where she was advised on intelligence and legal issues such as armed conflict, the use of force and weapons, and the legal framework for the conflict between the U.S. and Al-Qaeda. Her previous positions within the State Department focused on international law enforcement, extradition and diplomatic property.

Between 2010 and 2012, Deeks worked as an academic fellow at Columbia Law School before joining the University of Virginia School of Law as an associate professor in 2012. Her teaching and research interests include international law, national security law, intelligence, and the laws of armed conflict.

On January 11, 2021, it was announced that Deeks would serve as associate counsel in the Office of the White House Counsel. Deeks left the White House in June 2022 after her 17-month hiatus from University of Virginia, School of Law; she returned to teach as a Professor of Scholarly Research in Law.
