= Zayn Siddique =

American lawyer and political advisor

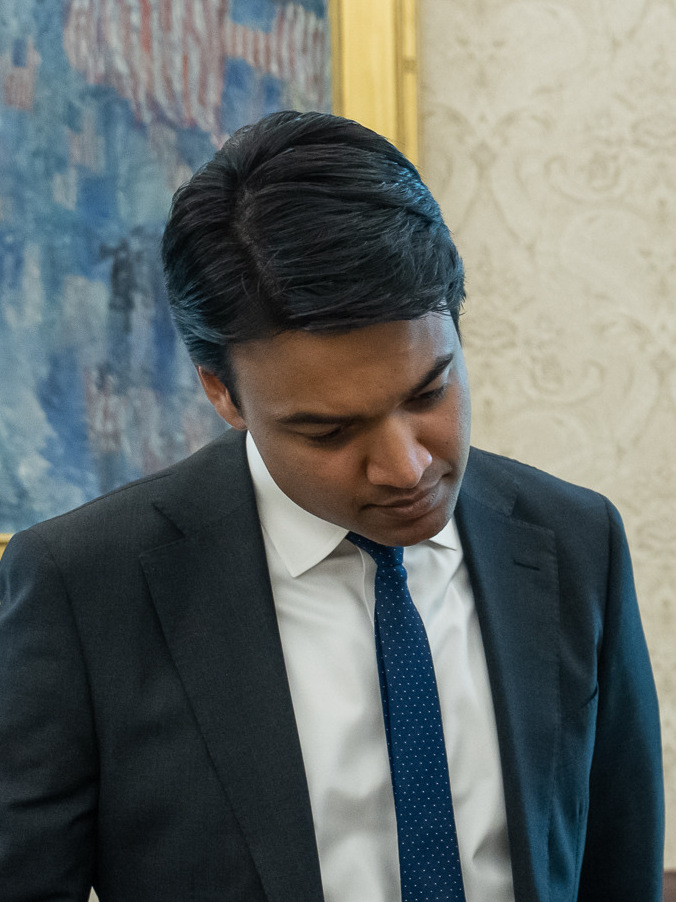

Principal Deputy Director of the Domestic Policy Council
- In office September 30, 2022 – November 2023
- President: Joe Biden
- Director: Susan Rice; Neera Tanden
- Preceded by: Position established

Personal details
- Party: Democratic
- Education: Princeton University (BA); Yale University (JD)

Zayn Siddique is an American political advisor who served as the Deputy Director of the Domestic Policy Council from 2022 to 2023. From 2021 to 2022, he was Senior Advisor to Bruce Reed, the White House Deputy Chief of Staff under President Joe Biden.

== Education ==
Siddique graduated from Hunter College High School in New York City. He earned his bachelor's degree from Princeton University. While at Princeton, he competed for the Princeton Debate Panel and won the American Parliamentary Debate Association's 2009 Team of the Year award. After completing his undergraduate degree, Siddique was a Fulbright Scholar in Jordan. He then earned his Juris Doctor from Yale Law School.

== Career ==
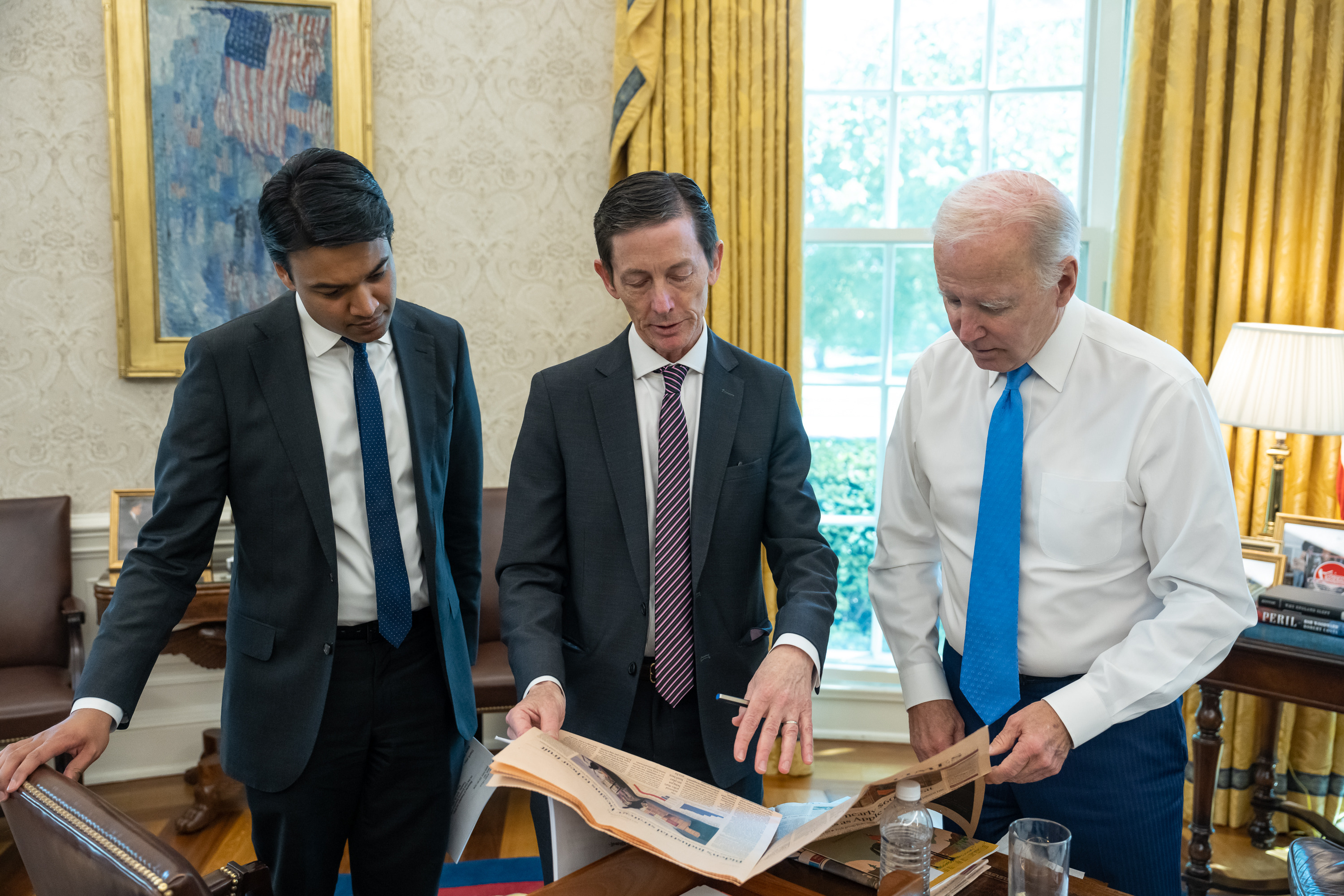
Siddique, Bruce Reed, and President Joe Biden in the Oval Office in April 2023

After graduating from law school, Siddique was a law clerk to Judge Dean Pregerson of the United States District Court for the Central District of California from 2016 to 2017, for Judge David S. Tatel of the United States Court of Appeals for the District of Columbia Circuit from 2017 to 2018, and then for Associate Justice Elena Kagan at the United States Supreme Court from 2019 to 2020. In between his clerkships, Siddique practiced law at Orrick, Herrington & Sutcliffe.

In 2019, Siddique served as Deputy Policy Director for the Beto for America campaign. Siddique was also a Senior Policy Advisor to Beto O'Rourke in his 2018 United States Senate race against incumbent United States Senator Ted Cruz.

He joined the team of the Biden transition in the summer of 2020 working with the domestic and economic policy teams. Siddique was also a member of Vice President Kamala Harris's prep team for the 2020 Vice-Presidential Debate.

From January 2021 to October 2022, he was Senior Advisor to Bruce Reed, the White House Deputy Chief of Staff under President Joe Biden. In October 2022, Siddique was appointed as Deputy Assistant to the President for Economic Mobility and deputy director of the Domestic Policy Council under Domestic Policy Advisor Susan Rice.

In May 2023, Siddique was elevated to Principal Deputy of the Domestic Policy Council, and left the White House shortly thereafter in November of that year.

In 2024, it was reported that Siddique supported debate preparations for Governor Tim Walz against then-Senator JD Vance in the 2024 vice presidential election debate, and that he participated in prepping President Biden and Vice President Harris for their debates in the 2024 presidential campaign.

== Personal life ==
Siddique and his family came to the United States from Bangladesh.
