= List of Arizona Wildcats in the NBA draft =

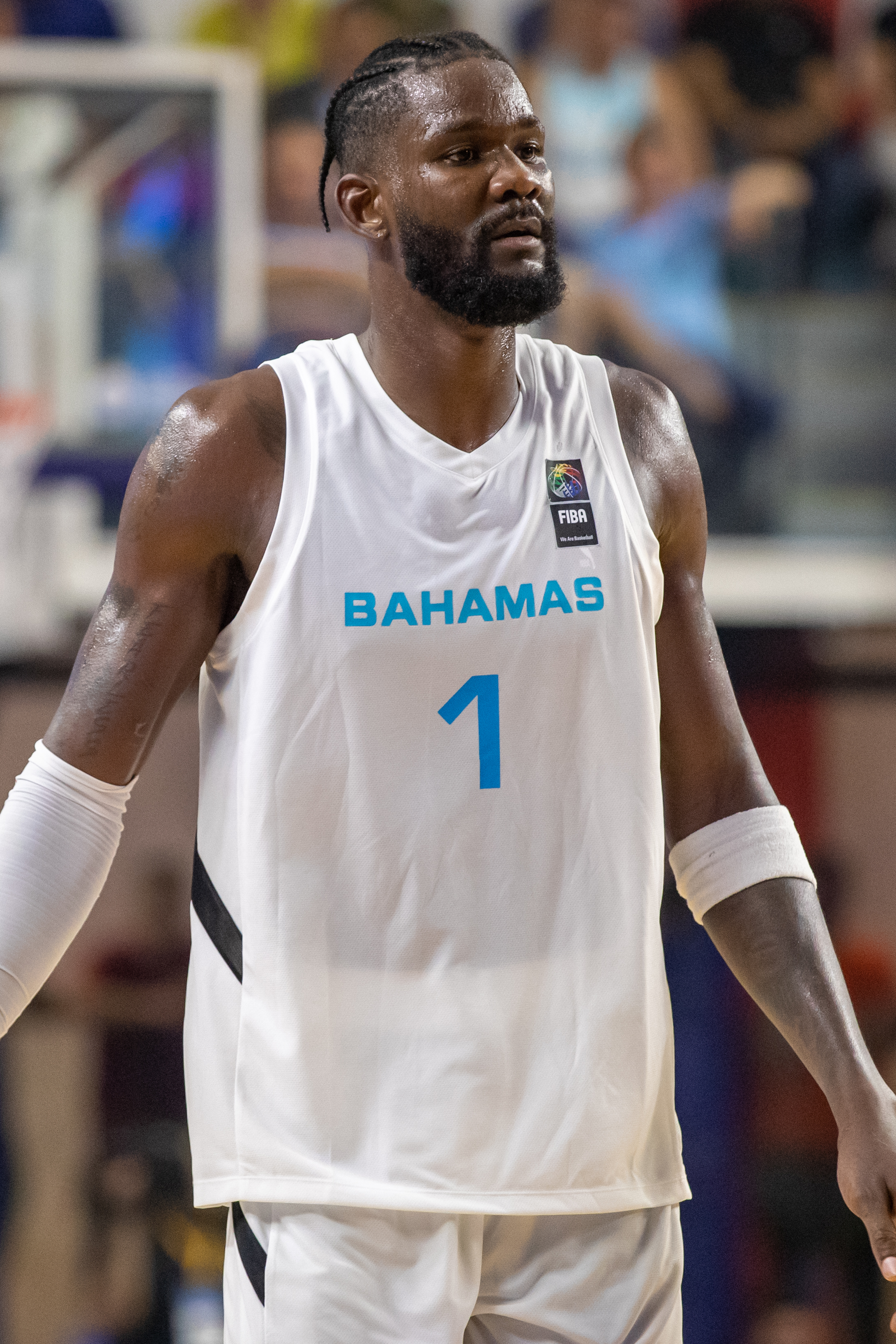
Deandre Ayton became the first Arizona Wildcat to be selected first overall.

The Arizona Wildcats men's basketball team, representing the University of Arizona, has had 75 players drafted into the National Basketball Association (NBA) since the league began holding drafts in 1947.

Each NBA franchise seeks to add new players through an annual draft. The NBA uses a draft lottery to determine the first three picks of the NBA draft; the 14 teams that did not make the playoffs the previous year are eligible to participate. After the first three picks are decided, the rest of the teams pick in reverse order of their win–loss record. To be eligible for the NBA draft, a player in the United States must be at least 19 years old during the calendar year of the draft and must be at least one year removed from the graduation of his high school class. From 1967 until the ABA–NBA merger in 1976, the American Basketball Association (ABA) held its own draft.

== Key ==
F	Forward	C	Center	G	Guard

*	Selected to an NBA/ABA All-Star Game
†	Won an NBA/ABA championship
‡	Selected to an All-Star Game and won an NBA/ABA championship

== Players selected ==
Arizona Wildcats selected in the NBA Draft
Draft				Player name	Position	NBA team (Note: This is the team that drafted the player, not his most recent team.)	Notes
Year	Round	Pick	Overall	Player name	Position	NBA team	Notes
1948	—	—	—	Morris Udall	F	Denver Nuggets	—
1948	—	—	—	Lincoln Richmond	G	Fort Wayne Pistons	—
1950	7	79	79	Leon Blevins	F	Indianapolis Olympians	—
1951	5	44	44	Leo Johnson	G	Fort Wayne Pistons	—
1952	-	-	-	Roger Johnson	G	Milwaukee Hawks	—
1960	17	95	95	Ernie McCray	G	Cincinnati Royals	—
1965	4	4	31	Warren Rustand	F	San Francisco Warriors	—
1968	12	160	160	Bill Davis	F	Phoenix Suns	—
1970	-	-	-	Mike Foster	F	Indiana Pacers	—
1971	10	160	160	Eddie Myers	F	Baltimore Bullets	—
1971	11	170	170	Bill Warner	G	Buffalo Braves	—
1971	9	147	147	Tom Lee	G	Philadelphia 76ers	—
1972	7	101	101	Bruce Anderson	G	Detroit Pistons	—
1974	2	33	33	Eric Money	G	Denver Nuggets	—
1974	3	37	37	Coniel Norman	G	Philadelphia 76ers	—
1976	2	30	30	Al Fleming	G	Phoenix Suns	—
1976	5	77	77	James Rappis	G	Milwaukee Bucks	—
1977	2	42	42	Bob Elliott	F	Philadelphia 76ers	—
1977	2	43	43	Herman Harris	G	Philadelphia 76ers	—
1977	8	164	164	Jerome Gladney	G	San Antonio Spurs	—
1978	10	198	198	Phil Taylor	F	Denver Nuggets	—
1979	1	9	9	Larry Demic	G	New York Knicks	—
1980	7	152	152	Joe Nehls	F	Houston Rockets	—
1981	4	79	79	Ron Davis	F, C	Washington Bullets	—
1981	6	148	148	Robbie Dosty	G	Golden State Warriors	—
1983	8	177	177	Frank Smith	G	Portland Trail Blazers	—
1984	1	10	10	Leon Wood	F, C	Philadelphia 76ers	—
1985	4	89	89	Pete Williams	F	Denver Nuggets	—
1985	7	158	158	Eddie Smith	G	Denver Nuggets	—
1988	2	34	34	Tom Tolbert	F	Charlotte Hornets (Note: When the franchise previously known as the Charlotte Bobcats renamed itself the Charlotte Hornets starting with the 2014–15 season, it received sole ownership of the history and records of the original Charlotte Hornets, which played from 1988 to 2002.)	–
1988	2	50	50	Steve Kerr^{†}	G	Phoenix Suns	NBA Champion (1996, 1997, 1998, 1999, 2003 as player; 2015, 2017, 2018, 2022 as a head coach)
1989	1	24	24	Anthony Cook	G	Phoenix Suns	—
1989	1	3	3	Sean Elliott^{‡}	F	San Antonio Spurs	NBA All-Rookie Second Team (1990), NBA All-Star (1993, 1996); NBA Champion (1999)
1990	2	38	38	Jud Buechler^{†}	F	Seattle SuperSonics	NBA Champion (1996–1998)
1991	1	10	10	Brian Williams^{†}	C	Orlando Magic	NBA Champion (1997)
1992	2	30	30	Sean Rooks	C	Dallas Mavericks	—
1993	1	22	22	Chris Mills	F	Cleveland Cavaliers	—
1993	2	35	35	Ed Stokes*	F	Miami Heat	—
1994	1	12	12	Khalid Reeves	G	Miami Heat	—
1995	1	7	7	Damon Stoudamire	G	Toronto Raptors	All-Rookie First Team (1996), Rookie of the Year (1996)
1996	2	35	35	Joseph Blair	F	Seattle SuperSonics	
1996	2	43	43	Ben Davis	F	Phoenix Suns	—
1996	2	56	56	Reggie Geary	F	Cleveland Cavaliers	—
1998	1	2	2	Mike Bibby	G	Vancouver Grizzlies	All-Rookie First Team (1999)
1998	1	14	14	Michael Dickerson	F	Houston Rockets	
1998	2	42	42	Miles Simon	G	Orlando Magic	NBA Champion (2020 as an assistant coach)
1999	1	10	10	Jason Terry^{†}	G	Atlanta Hawks	NBA Champion (2011)
1999	2	39	39	A.J. Bramlett	F	Cleveland Cavaliers	—
2001	1	13	13	Richard Jefferson^{†}	F	Houston Rockets	All-Rookie Second Team (2002), NBA Champion (2016)
2001	2	31	31	Gilbert Arenas^{*}	G	Golden State Warriors	NBA All-Star (2005, 2006, 2007); Most Improved Player (2003)
2001	2	39	39	Michael Wright	G	New York Knicks	—
2001	2	46	46	Loren Woods	G	Minnesota Timberwolves	—
2003	2	32	32	Luke Walton^{†}	F	Los Angeles Lakers	NBA Champions (2009, 2010 as player; 2015 as assistant coach)
2004	1	9	9	Andre Iguodala^{‡}	F	Philadelphia 76ers	All-Rookie First Team (2005), NBA All-Star (2012); NBA Champion (2015, 2017, 2018, 2022); Finals MVP (2015)
2005	1	8	8	Channing Frye	G	New York Knicks	All-Rookie First Team (2006), NBA Champion (2016)
2005	2	31	31	Salim Stoudamire	G	Atlanta Hawks	—
2006	2	54	54	Hassan Adams	G	New Jersey Nets	—
2007	2	33	33	Marcus Williams	G	San Antonio Spurs	—
2008	1	11	11	Jerryd Bayless	G	Indiana Pacers	—
2009	1	8	8	Jordan Hill	F	New York Knicks	—
2009	2	44	44	Chase Budinger	F	Detroit Pistons	—
2011	1	2	2	Derrick Williams	F	Minnesota Timberwolves	2012 All-Rookie Second Team, NBA All-Rookie Second Team (2012)
2013	1	23	23	Solomon Hill	F	Indiana Pacers	—
2013	2	40	40	Grant Jerrett	G	Portland Trail Blazers	—
2014	1	4	4	Aaron Gordon	F	Orlando Magic	NBA Champion (2023)
2014	2	17	17	Nick Johnson	G	Houston Rockets	—
2015	1	8	8	Stanley Johnson	F	Detroit Pistons	—
2015	1	23	23	Rondae Hollis-Jefferson	F	Portland Trail Blazers	—
2017	1	7	7	Lauri Markkanen	F	Minnesota Timberwolves	All-Rookie First Team (2018)
2017	2	53	53	Kadeem Allen	G	Boston Celtics	NBA G League All-Defensive Team (2018)
2018	1	1	1	Deandre Ayton	F	Phoenix Suns	First Wildcat selected 1st Overall, All-Rookie First Team (2019)
2020	1	18	18	Josh Green	F	Dallas Mavericks	—
2020	1	22	22	Zeke Nnaji	F	Denver Nuggets	NBA Champion (2023)
2020	2	48	48	Nico Mannion	G	Golden State Warriors	His father Pace Mannion was drafted 43rd by Golden State in the 1983
2022	1	6	6	Bennedict Mathurin	G	Indiana Pacers	All-Rookie First Team (2023)
2022	1	18	18	Dalen Terry	G	Chicago Bulls	—
2022	2	33	33	Christian Koloko	C	Toronto Raptors	—
2024	2	44	44	Pelle Larsson	G/F	Houston Rockets	—
2025	1	14	14	Carter Bryant	F	San Antonio Spurs	Rising Stars Challenge Champion (2026)
2026	1	10	10	Brayden Burries	G	Milwaukee Bucks	—
2026	1	30	30	Koa Peat	F	Dallas Mavericks	—
2026	2	50	50	Jaden Bradley	PG	Toronto Raptors	—
