= Rajesh De =

American lawyer and government official

Raj De

General Counsel of the United States National Security Agency
- In office April 2012 – March 2015
- President: Barack Obama
- Preceded by: Matthew G. Olsen
- Succeeded by: Glenn S. Gerstell

White House Staff Secretary
- In office January 30, 2011 – April 2012
- President: Barack Obama
- Preceded by: Lisa Brown
- Succeeded by: Douglas Kramer

Personal details
- Born: 1971 or 1972 (age 54–55) Pennsylvania, U.S.
- Party: Democratic
- Education: Harvard University (BA, JD)
- Website: Official website

Rajesh "Raj" De (born circa 1972) is an American lawyer and former U.S. government official who later became the managing partner for the Washington, D.C., office of the law firm Mayer Brown. During the presidency of Barack Obama, he served in three significant government roles—as Principal Deputy Assistant Attorney General in the Office of Legal Policy, as White House Staff Secretary, and finally as general counsel of the U.S. National Security Agency.

Earlier in his career, he was counsel to the 9/11 Commission and assisted in drafting the 9/11 Commission Report and the legislation implementing recommendations of the Report.

== Early life and education ==
De was born and raised near Philadelphia, Pennsylvania, the son of Indian Bengali immigrants. He received his bachelor's degree from Harvard College and earned his J.D. degree from Harvard Law School in 1999. His law school room-mate John P. Carlin also served in the Obama administration as chief of staff to FBI Director Robert Mueller, and later as Assistant Attorney General for the National Security Division. During law school, De clerked for Judge A. Wallace Tashima on the U.S. Ninth Circuit Court of Appeals in California.

== Career ==
Immediately after his law school graduation, De began his legal career in public service at the United States Department of Justice as a litigator in the Antitrust Division. De's appointment was under the Attorney General's Honors Program—a program to place promising new attorneys in the Department of Justice.

=== 9/11 Commission ===
Following the September 11 attacks, he served as counsel to the 9/11 Commission, conducting interviews with dozens of U.S. government and foreign officials, and drafting part of the 9/11 Commission Report. Following the publishing of the report, De went to work as special bipartisan staff to the U.S. Senate Homeland Security Committee, where he assisted in the drafting of legislation implementing the report's recommendations—including the establishment of a Director of National Intelligence and a National Counterterrorism Center. His work was ultimately incorporated into the 2004 Intelligence Reform and Terrorism Prevention Act. In 2015, De described the publication of the 9/11 Commission Report as his proudest legal accomplishment.

He left government briefly in 2006 to work as an associate at the law firm Mayer Brown, to which he later returned. During this time, he also served as pro bono counsel to the Commission on the Prevention of Weapons of Mass Destruction, Proliferation and Terrorism.

=== Office of Legal Policy ===
Near the beginning of the presidency of Barack Obama, De returned to the U.S. Department of Justice, where he was appointed Principal Deputy Assistant Attorney General in the Office of Legal Policy under Acting Assistant Attorney General Kevin R. Jones. Jones was a career DOJ employee who became Acting AAG with the departure of President Bush's appointee in that role; President Obama's nominee for Assistant Attorney General, Christopher H. Schroeder, was not confirmed until April 2010, leaving De as the senior-most political appointee at the Office of Legal Policy until that confirmation. In this role, he worked closely with Attorney General Eric Holder as well as leadership across all DOJ components.

=== White House Staff Secretary ===
In 2010, De moved to the White House when he was appointed Deputy Assistant to the President and Deputy Staff Secretary under Lisa Brown. When Brown departed the White House in early 2011, De was promoted to White House Staff Secretary, serving in that capacity until April 2012. The White House Staff Secretary is responsible for managing paper flow to the President and circulating documents among senior staff and cabinet agencies. De later described the role as "the ultimate grind job," due to the volume of work and the necessity of absolute perfection when dealing with a president's papers, and said that the job gave him insight and exposed him to all aspects of the federal government and their interaction with the President.

Following Trump administration Staff Secretary Rob Porter being revealed in 2018 to have been working without a full security clearance, De was outspoken in criticizing Porter and the Trump White House for the breach.

=== National Security Agency ===
From April 2012 through March 2015, he was general counsel for the U.S. National Security Agency, where he oversaw a department of roughly 100 lawyers and staff. De represented the agency and agency leaders in inter-agency conversations, at hearings before Congress, at the U.S. Foreign Intelligence Surveillance Court, and to foreign governments. His time at NSA was marked by controversy over disclosures of NSA surveillance practices.

=== Mayer Brown ===
After leaving the NSA, he rejoined the law firm Mayer Brown. In 2019 he was appointed managing partner at Mayer Brown's Washington, D.C., office, leading the firm's global Cybersecurity & Data Privacy practice and National Security practice, and serving as a member of the firm's Congressional Investigations & Crisis Management team.

In addition to his work for the law firm, De became a member of the Homeland Security Group at the Aspen Institute, a member of the board of directors of the Southern Center for Human Rights, a non-resident fellow at the Reiss Center on Law and Security at New York University School of Law, and a member of the Central Intelligence Agency general counsel's external advisory board.

=== Biden transition ===
In November 2020, De was named a volunteer member of the Joe Biden presidential transition Agency Review Team to support transition efforts related to the U.S. Department of Justice.

== Awards and recognition ==
De was awarded the U.S. Attorney General's John Marshall Award, the Department of Justice's highest award for attorneys. He was also awarded Department of Defense Medal for Distinguished Civilian Service, the National Intelligence Distinguished Service Medal, the National Security Agency Director's Distinguished Service Medal, and the National Security Agency Intelligence Under Law Award.

Political offices
| Preceded by Lisa Brown | White House Staff Secretary; 2011–2012 | Succeeded by Douglas Kramer |
