= James E. Connor =

American political aide (1939–1994)

James Connor
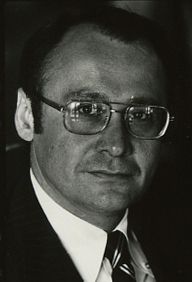

White House Staff Secretary
- In office June 9, 1975 – January 20, 1977
- President: Gerald Ford
- Preceded by: Jerry H. Jones
- Succeeded by: Richard Hutcheson

White House Cabinet Secretary
- In office June 9, 1975 – January 20, 1977
- President: Gerald Ford
- Preceded by: Warren Rustand
- Succeeded by: Jack Watson

Personal details
- Born: October 4, 1939 Philadelphia, Pennsylvania, U.S.
- Died: October 30, 1994 (aged 55) Dallas, Texas, U.S.
- Party: Republican
- Education: Columbia University (BA, MA, PhD)

James E. Connor (October 4, 1939 - October 30, 1994) was an American political aide who served as White House Cabinet Secretary and Staff Secretary to the President under Gerald Ford.

== Biography ==
Connor was born on October 4, 1939, in Philadelphia, Pennsylvania. He received his B.A. degree in 1961, M.A. in 1963, and Ph.D. from Columbia University.

From 1968 to 1969, he was an assistant professor at Columbia University. He was named a White House fellow in September 1968 and served a year in the Bureau of the Budget as Staff Assistant to the Director.

During 1969 and 1970, he was a Senior Associate with Cresap, McCormick and Paget Inc., a New York-based management consulting firm.

Between 1970 and 1971 he was Director of Planning and Program Analysis in the Office of Equal Opportunity, serving under Donald Rumsfeld. He served as Special Assistant for Policy Development to the Secretary of Commerce Maurice Stans from 1971 to 1972.

He joined the Atomic Energy Commission as Director of Office of Planning and Analysis in 1972. He was brought into the Ford White House by Assistant to the President Donald Rumsfeld in 1974. His first assignment was to review presidential scheduling and advance operations in the White House Personnel Office.

Connor was appointed to White House Cabinet Secretary by President Gerald Ford on January 6, 1975. As Cabinet Secretary, Connor was the main intermediary between the White House and Cabinet officials and oversaw the organization of Cabinet meetings by preparing agendas, assembling background papers, accumulating meeting minutes, confirming attendance by Cabinet officers and White House aides, and coordinating follow-up activities.

He also took over Jerry H. Jones's role as Staff Secretary on June 9, 1975. his duties included monitoring the flow of paperwork to and from the president, including special presidential courier service outside the Washington, D.C. area. He also notified White House staff, Cabinet officials and other senior level advisers of the final decisions and comments on documents sent to the president and on certain personnel appointments. He left office in January 1977.

He returned to the private sector by serving as assistant to the Chairman of First Boston Corporation and later became a managing director of the company.

== Personal life ==
Connor was married to the former Judith M. Turner of Toronto. He died on October 30 at a hospital in Dallas after surgery for a brain tumor.
