= Lisa Brown (lawyer) =

American lawyer (born 1960)

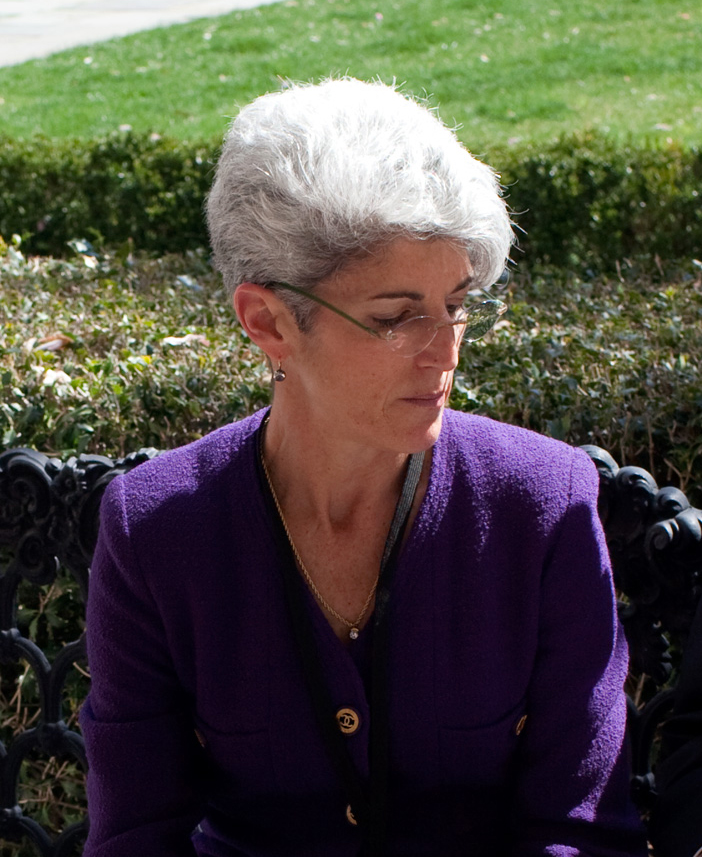
- Brown at the White House, April 2009

General Counsel of the United States Department of Education
- In office October 8, 2021 – January 20, 2025
- President: Joe Biden
- Preceded by: Emma Leheny (acting)
- Succeeded by: Vacant

25th White House Staff Secretary
- In office January 20, 2009 – January 30, 2011
- President: Barack Obama
- Preceded by: Raul Yanes
- Succeeded by: Rajesh De

Personal details
- Born: Elizabeth Merrill Brown; March 6, 1960 (age 66) Washington, D.C., U.S.
- Party: Democratic
- Spouse: Kevin Cullen (m. 1998)
- Children: 1
- Education: Princeton University (BA); University of Chicago (JD)

Elizabeth Merrill "Lisa" Brown (born March 6, 1960) is an American lawyer who was the General Counsel of the United States Department of Education. She previously served as the first White House Staff Secretary in the Obama administration, assuming that post on January 20, 2009. Earlier, during the 2008–2009 presidential transition, she served as Co-Chair of Agency Review. Prior to joining the Obama Transition Team, she served as Executive Director of the American Constitution Society, a progressive legal organization.

After President Obama's 2011 State of the Union Address, Brown joined the Office of Management and Budget to assist the ambitious effort to draft a government reorganization proposal. In March 2013, she left the White House to become chief legal counsel to Georgetown University as Vice President and General Counsel.

== Early life and education ==
Brown was born in Washington, D.C., and attended the prestigious Hotchkiss School in Lakeville, Connecticut. A 1982 Magna Cum Laude Princeton University graduate with a B.A. in Political Economy, Brown earned a J.D. degree with Honors from the University of Chicago Law School in 1986. She then clerked on the U.S. Court of Appeals for the 11th Circuit for Judge John Cooper Godbold in Montgomery, Alabama, and she held a one-year fellowship as a Staff Attorney at the Center for Law in the Public Interest in Los Angeles, California.

== Private sector and pro bono work ==
Before entering government service, Brown was a Partner in the Washington, D.C., law firm Shea & Gardner; while litigating and doing transactional work for the firm's paying clients, she also had a substantial pro bono practice focusing on disability issues, civil rights and social justice. She wrote briefs in the U.S. Supreme Court and federal circuit courts in disability cases under The Fair Housing Amendments Act of 1988. She also reviewed appeals by rejected claimants in Dyson v. Denny's, Inc. (D. Md.), serving as the court-appointed Special Master. She was co-editor for the Washington Legal Clinic for the Homeless of Cold, Harsh and Unending Resistance: The District of Columbia Government's Hidden War Against Its Poor and Its Homeless (November 22, 1993), a report on social services litigation.

== Clinton administration ==
Brown joined the American Constitution Society (ACS) in 2002, coming from Relman & Associates, a Washington, D.C., civil rights firm. She had previously worked for Vice President Al Gore as Counsel (1999 through January 2001) and Deputy Counsel (April 1997 through August 1999). Her work included not only handling legal matters but also advising the Vice President on civil rights and various domestic policy issues. She also served on the Executive Board of the President's Committee on Employment of People with Disabilities. Before joining the Vice President's office, she was an Attorney Advisor in the Department of Justice's Office of Legal Counsel (June 1996 to April 1997).

== Personal life ==
On January 3, 1998, Brown married Kevin Cullen, an oncologist who directs the University of Maryland's cancer center. They have one son.

Political offices
Preceded by Raul Yanes	White House Staff Secretary; 2009–2011	Succeeded by Rajesh De
