= Jessica Hertz =

American attorney and political advisor

White House Staff Secretary
- In office January 20, 2021 – October 22, 2021
- President: Joe Biden
- Preceded by: Derek Lyons
- Succeeded by: Neera Tanden

Personal details
- Born: 1981 or 1982 (age 44–45)
- Party: Democratic
- Education: Harvard University (BA); University of Chicago (JD)

Jessica Hertz (born 1981/1982) is an American attorney and political advisor who served as the White House staff secretary in the Biden administration from January to October 2021. Hertz previously served as general counsel for the presidential transition of Joe Biden and associate general counsel at Facebook. After leaving the White House, Hertz was named general counsel of e-commerce company Shopify.

== Education ==
Hertz earned a Bachelor of Arts degree from Harvard University and a J.D. degree from the University of Chicago Law School. As a law student, she was the articles editor of the University of Chicago Law Review.

== Career ==
Hertz worked as a law clerk for judges Sonia Sotomayor and Barbara S. Jones. From 2009 to 2011, she was counselor to the administrator of the Office of Information and Regulatory Affairs. In 2011 and 2012, she was counselor to the United States Deputy Attorney General. She served as principal deputy counsel to then-Vice President Joe Biden from 2012 to 2014. After leaving the Obama administration in 2014, Hertz became a partner at Jenner & Block. In April 2018, she joined Facebook as the company's associate counsel for regulatory affairs.

In September 2020, Hertz joined the presidential transition of Joe Biden as general counsel. On December 30, 2020, it was announced that Hertz would serve as White House staff secretary in the incoming Biden administration. In October 2021, it was announced that Hertz would resign from her position to become general counsel for Shopify.

== Personal life ==
Hertz is married to Christopher Angell, an attorney working as a business manager at Oracle.

Political offices
Preceded by Derek Lyons	White House Staff Secretary; 2021	Succeeded by Neera Tanden
