= Paul T. Carroll =

United States Army general (1910–1954)

Pete Carroll
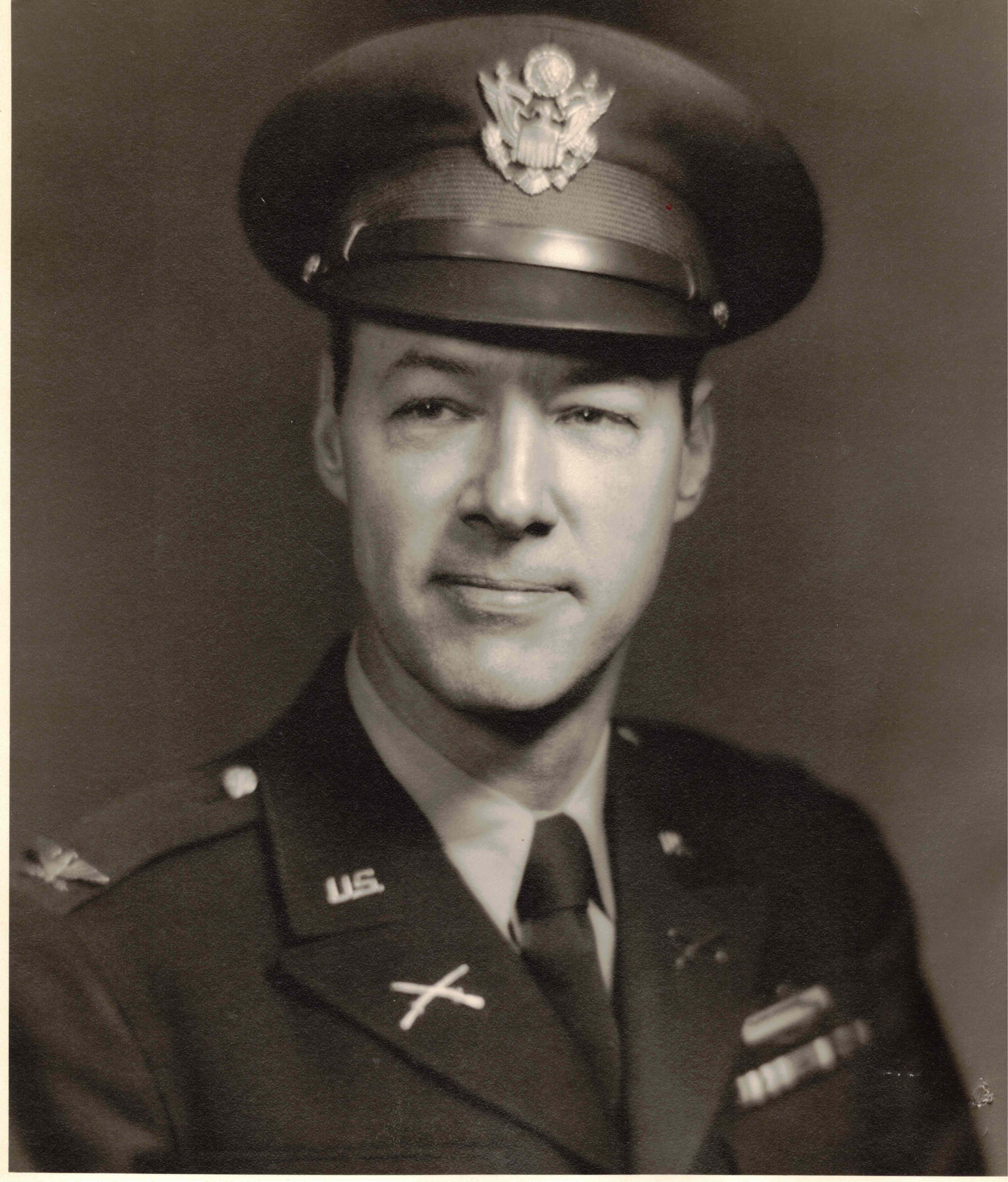
- Portrait (1953)

White House Staff Secretary
- In office January 21, 1953 – September 17, 1954
- President: Dwight Eisenhower
- Preceded by: Position established
- Succeeded by: Andrew Goodpaster

Personal details
- Born: April 6, 1910 Woonsocket, Rhode Island, U.S.
- Died: September 17, 1954 (aged 44) Washington, D.C., U.S.
- Resting place: Arlington National Cemetery
- Spouse: Ruth Cooper (m. 1936)
- Children: 3
- Education: United States Military Academy (BS)

Military service
- Allegiance: United States
- Branch/service: United States Army
- Years of service: 1933–1954
- Rank: Brigadier General
- Battles/wars: World War II
- Awards: Silver Star (2); Bronze Star Medal; Legion of Merit (2)

Paul “Pete” Thomas Carroll (April 6, 1910 – September 17, 1954) was a United States Army Brigadier General and White House Staff Secretary to President Dwight D. Eisenhower. During World War II, he served in combat and was awarded two Silver Stars and a Bronze Star for valor.

== Biography ==
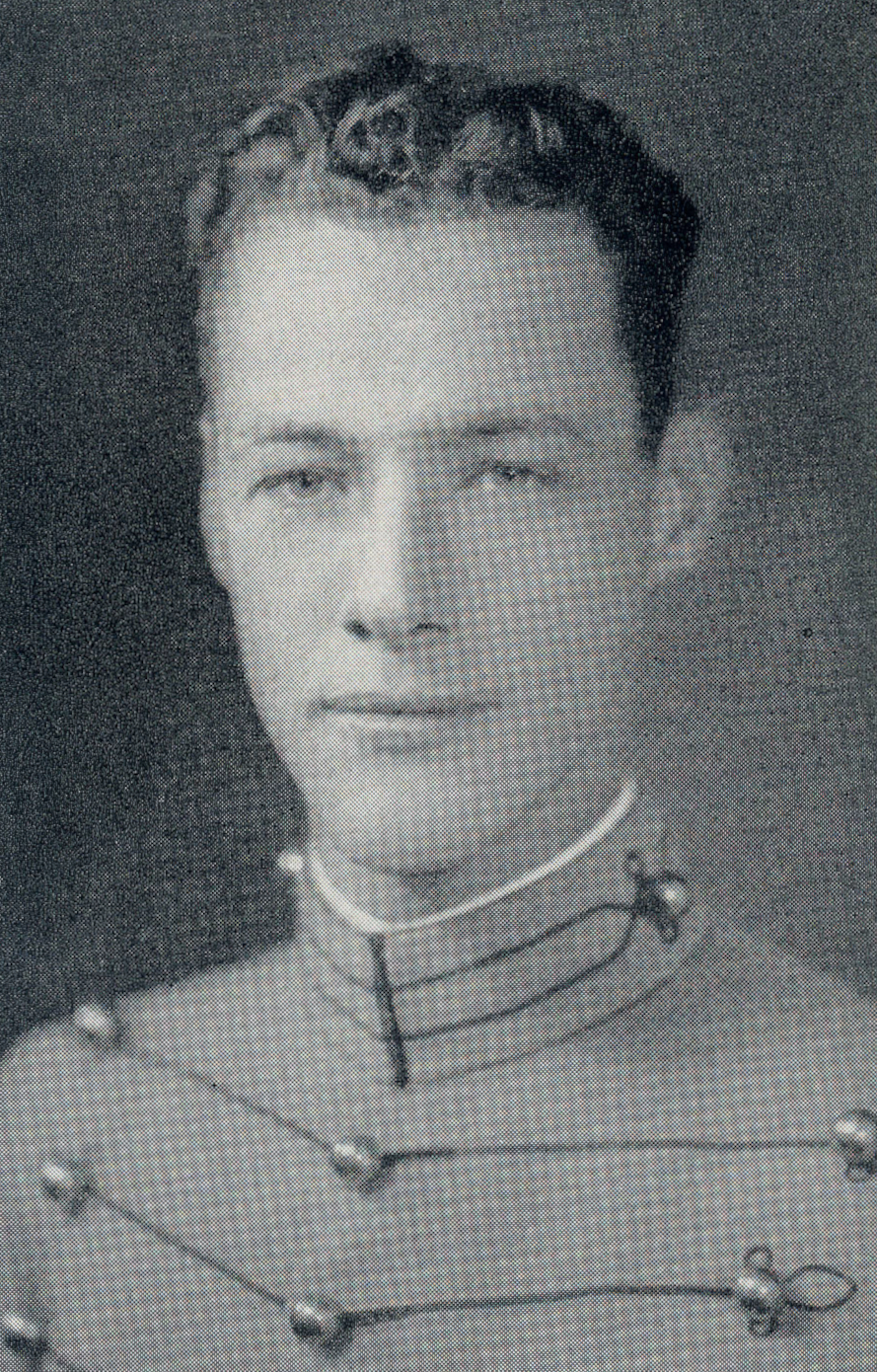
Carroll as a United States Military Academy cadet c. 1933

Paul Thomas Carroll was born April 6, 1910, in Woonsocket, Rhode Island. He graduated from Woonsocket High School in 1928 and from the United States Military Academy (West Point) in 1933.

As an infantry officer he served in the 16th, 35th and 10th Infantry Regiments at Fort Jay, NY; Schofield Barracks, HI; Fort Benning, GA and Fort Custer, MI. In September 1941, he was posted with the 10th Infantry to Iceland, where he served for over two years before being transferred to the 2d Regiment where he served as Executive Officer. Both regiments were part of the Fifth infantry Division of the Third Army. The 2d Regiment underwent intensive training in England and Northern Ireland in preparation for the invasion of Europe, and Carroll landed with them at Utah Beach on July 9, 1944. Over the next four months, he served variously as Executive Officer and Battalion Commander for the 2d Regiment, and later back with the 10th Regiment. Both units were engaged in intense combat across France, during which Carroll received two Silver Stars for gallantry in action and a Bronze Star for valor.

In October 1944, Carroll was ordered back to the Pentagon where he was the daily combat briefing officer of the Operations Division of the War Department General Staff, in which capacity he read telegraph messages, got a sense of how the war was progressing, put the developments on a map and briefed the senior officers every morning. After the war, he moved from the Operations Division to the Office of the Army Chief of Staff, where he worked, successively, for Generals of the Army George C. Marshall, Dwight D. Eisenhower and Omar Bradley. He was awarded the Legion of Merit with Oak Leaf Cluster during this service.

From August 1948 to February 1949, Carroll attended and graduated from the Armed Forces Staff College in Norfolk, VA. His next assignment was the Command and General Staff College in Fort Leavenworth, KS, where, as a Lieutenant Colonel, he taught fellow officers and served as Executive Officer and Class Supervisor, Department of Operations and Training. On July 1, 1950, Carroll was recruited to join the faculty at the Army War College, also in Fort Leavenworth, where he taught for the remainder of the year.

In October 1950, Carroll was called by General Eisenhower to assist him in putting together staff for the military headquarters of the newly established North Atlantic Treaty Organization (NATO) in France. Eisenhower was formally appointed at Supreme Allied Commander Europe (SACEUR) of NATO on December 19, 1950, and Carroll (recently promoted to Colonel) was ordered to France and flew with Eisenhower to Europe on January 6, 1950.

At NATO Headquarters in France, Carroll served as a head of correspondence and a close advisor to General Eisenhower. He assisted in speech writing and coordinating Eisenhower's initial trips to each of the member nations.

On April 12, 1952, Eisenhower announced his intention to resign as SACEUR and seek the Republican nomination for president. Eisenhower left Europe in June 1952 and Carroll followed soon thereafter. On August 24, 1952, Carroll reported to his next assignment as a student at the National War College. Although prohibited from campaigning and other political activity by virtue of his status as an Army officer, he kept in touch with Eisenhower and assisted him in putting together a staff to run the campaign and prepare for the White House.

Shortly after his successful November 1952 election, Eisenhower made a secret trip to Korea, fulfilling a campaign promise. He called upon Carroll to assist in organizing the trip and accompanying him to Korea. Upon returning to the States, Carroll was transferred from the National War College to the White House transition team, in which capacity he assisted Eisenhower in organizing, recruiting, and hiring the White House staff. When Eisenhower took office on January 20, 1953, Carroll was assigned to the White House as Military Assistant and Liaison Officer to the Department of Defense. In July 1953, Eisenhower created the position of White House Staff Secretary and appointed Carroll as the first holder of the position. As Staff Secretary, Carroll was responsible for managing paper flow to the President and circulating documents among senior staff for comment. He also reviewed presidential directives. During the Eisenhower administration, the focus of the position was on National Security matters.

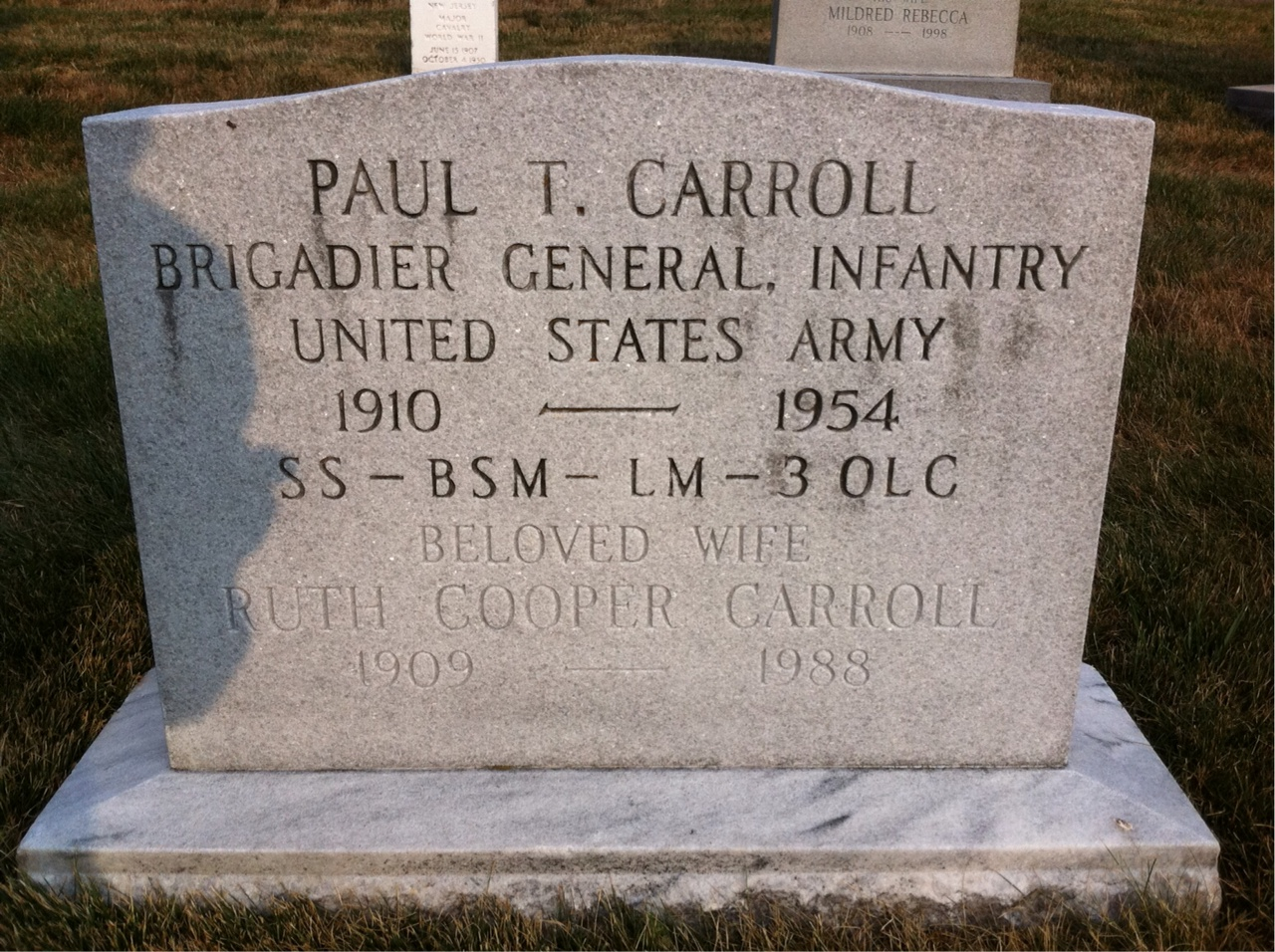
Grave of Paul T. Carroll at Arlington National Cemetery

Carroll was promoted to brigadier general on July 24, 1953. He died on duty of a heart attack in Washington on September 17, 1954, at age 44, and is buried in Arlington National Cemetery.

Political offices
New office	White House Staff Secretary; 1953–1954	Succeeded by Andrew Goodpaster
