= Benjamin Edwards (artist) =

American visual artist and writer

- Born: 1970 (age 55–56); Iowa City, Iowa, U.S.
- Education: University of California, Los Angeles (BA); San Francisco Art Institute; Rhode Island School of Design (MFA)
- Spouse: Neera Tanden (m. 1999)
- Children: 2

Benjamin Edwards (born 1970) is an American visual artist known for his work with satellite maps, architectural blueprints, and computer models as source material. He is the husband of political consultant and former government official Neera Tanden.

== Early life and education ==
Benjamin Edwards was born in Iowa City, Iowa. He earned a bachelor's degree from University of California, Los Angeles and studied toward a master's in painting at the San Francisco Art Institute before earning a Master of Fine Arts from the Rhode Island School of Design.

== Career ==
Edwards is known for his paintings that employ appropriated imagery such as satellite maps, architectural blueprints or computer models as source material. His 2004 painting Immersion, for example, used cartography to explore the impact of the highway system on the development of the American suburbs. His 1998 work Starbucks: Seattle: Compression compressed all of the Starbucks stores in Seattle into one image. In other works, he has created landscapes from images of fast-food restaurants, commercial signs, condominiums, shopping malls, convenience stores or corporate logos.

== Collections ==
- Carnegie Museum of Art
- Museum of Modern Art, New York
- Orlando Museum of Art

== Personal life ==
Edwards is married to Neera Tanden, a lawyer and Democratic political advisor.
