= Andrew Goodpaster =

US Army general (1915–2005)

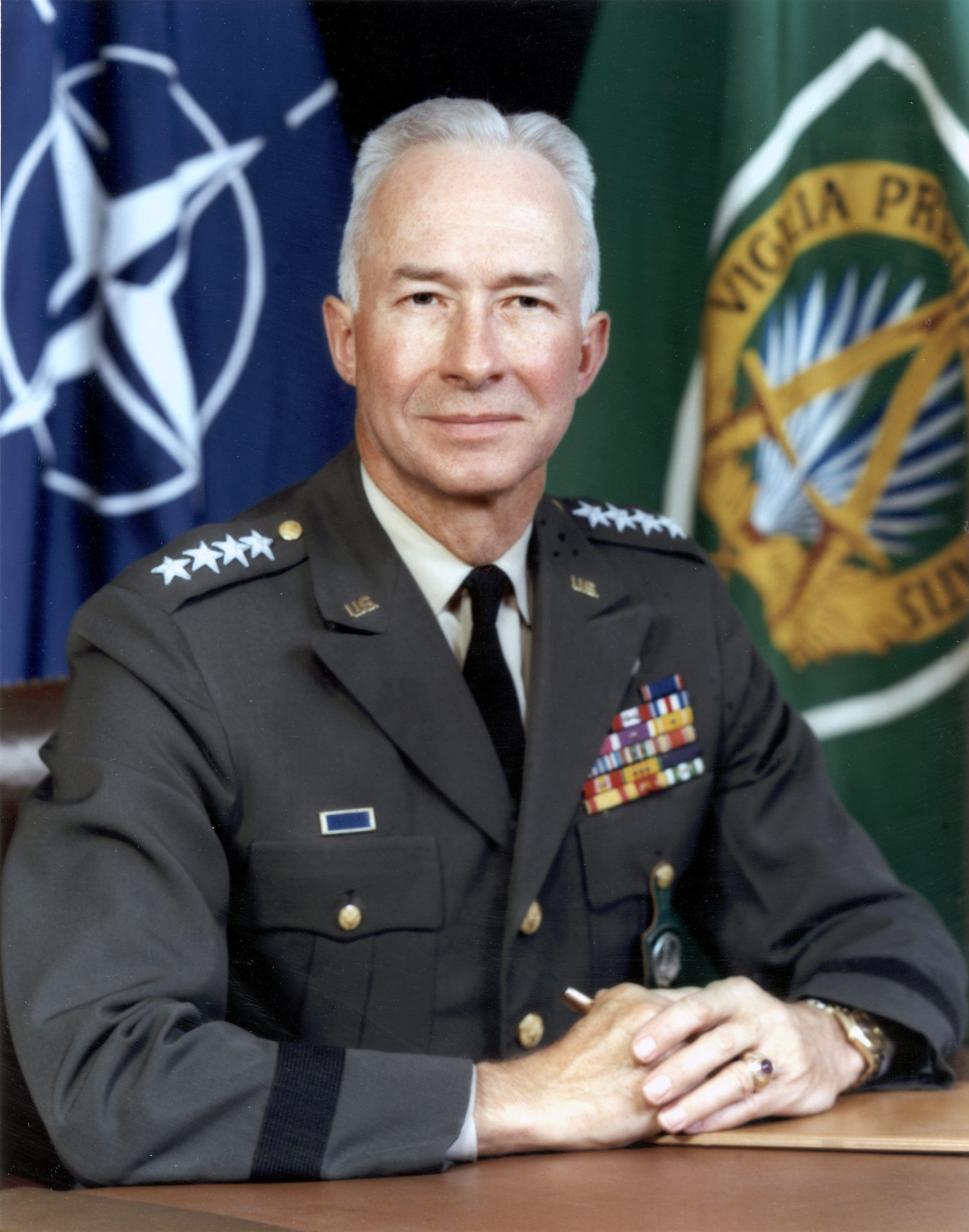
- Official portrait, 1969

6th Supreme Allied Commander Europe
- In office 1 July 1969 – 15 December 1974
- President: Richard Nixon; Gerald Ford
- Deputy: Robert Bray; Desmond Fitzpatrick; John Mogg
- Preceded by: Lyman Lemnitzer
- Succeeded by: Alexander M. Haig Jr.

Director of the Joint Staff
- In office 1 August 1966 – 31 March 1967
- President: Lyndon B. Johnson
- Preceded by: David A. Burchinal
- Succeeded by: Berton E. Spivy

Superintendent of the United States Military Academy
- In office 1977–1981
- Preceded by: Sidney Bryan Berry
- Succeeded by: Willard Warren Scott Jr.

Chairman of the American Battle Monuments Commission
- In office 1985–1990
- Preceded by: Mark W. Clark
- Succeeded by: Paul X. Kelley

White House Staff Secretary
- In office October 1954 – 20 January 1961
- President: Dwight D. Eisenhower
- Preceded by: Pete Carroll
- Succeeded by: Bill Hartigan

Personal details
- Born: 12 February 1915 Granite City, Illinois, U.S.
- Died: 16 May 2005 (aged 90) Washington, D.C., U.S.
- Resting place: Arlington National Cemetery
- Spouse: Dorothy Dulaney Anderson (m. 1939) (1916-2006)
- Children: 2
- Education: United States Military Academy (BS); Princeton University (MS, MA, PhD)
- Nickname: "GoodP"

Military service
- Allegiance: United States of America
- Branch/service: United States Army
- Years of service: 1939–1974; 1977–1981
- Rank: General
- Unit: Corps of Engineers
- Commands: 8th Infantry Division; National War College; Supreme Allied Commander Europe; Superintendent of the United States Military Academy
- Battles/wars: World War II; Cold War; Vietnam War
- Awards: Army Distinguished Service Cross; Defense Distinguished Service Medal (2); Army Distinguished Service Medal (4); Navy Distinguished Service Medal; Air Force Distinguished Service Medal; Silver Star; Purple Heart (2); Presidential Medal of Freedom; National Order of Vietnam

Andrew Jackson Goodpaster (12 February 1915 – 16 May 2005) was a United States Army general who served as NATO's Supreme Allied Commander, Europe (SACEUR), from 1 July 1969, and Commander in Chief of the United States European Command (CINCEUR) from 5 May 1969 until his retirement 17 December 1974. As such, he was the commander of all NATO (SACEUR) and United States (CINCEUR) military forces stationed in Europe and the surrounding regions.

Goodpaster returned to the military in June 1977 as the 51st Superintendent of the United States Military Academy at West Point, New York, until he retired again in July 1981.

== Career ==
Goodpaster entered the United States Military Academy at West Point in 1935, followed in 1939 by a commission as a second lieutenant in the Corps of Engineers after graduating second in his class of 456. After serving in Panama, he returned to the U.S. in mid-1942, and in 1943, he attended a wartime course at the Command and General Staff School, Fort Leavenworth, Kansas.

During World War II, Goodpaster commanded the 48th Combat Engineer Battalion in North Africa and Italy. He was awarded the Distinguished Service Cross, the Silver Star, and two Purple Hearts for his service in World War II. His combat experience was cut short in January 1944, when he was severely wounded and sent back to the United States to recover. After his wounds had healed, he was assigned to the War Planning Office under General Marshall, where he served the duration of the war.

Goodpaster was seen by many as the quintessential "soldier-scholar." He received a Ph.D. in politics from Princeton University in 1950 after completing a doctoral dissertation titled "National technology and international politics." He later received an honorary Doctor of Laws degree from Princeton in 1979. Princeton says he earned degrees in civil engineering and politics.

== Key assignments ==
- Staff Secretary and Defense Liaison Officer to President Eisenhower (1954–1961)
- Advisor to the Administrations of Presidents Johnson (1963–1969), Nixon (1969–1974), and Carter (1977–1981)
- Commander of the San Francisco District of the U.S. Army Corps of Engineers (USACE)
- Commander of the 8th Infantry Division in Germany (1961–1962)
- Director of the Joint Staff, Office of the Joint Chiefs of Staff (1966–1967)
- Commandant of the National War College (1967–1968)
- Deputy Commander of the U.S. Military Assistance Command, Vietnam (MACV) (1968–1969)
- Commander-in-Chief of USEUCOM and Supreme Allied Commander of NATO Forces (1969–1974)
- Superintendent, USMA (1977–1981)

== First retirement ==
After retiring in 1974, he served as senior fellow at the Woodrow Wilson International Center for Scholars in 1975–76, and taught at The Citadel. His book, For the Common Defense was published in 1977.

He was brought back to active duty as Superintendent of the U.S. Military Academy (1977–1981) after 1976 West Point cheating scandal involving 151 cadets (see also, 1951 West Point cheating scandal). Although he had retired with the rank of General (four star), he voluntarily served as superintendent at the lower rank of Lieutenant General (three stars), since the billet carries that rank.

== Second retirement and later years ==
In 1981, Goodpaster retired for the second time at the four-star rank. He stayed active in retirement serving on various boards and working on his own memoirs. He died at age 90 at Walter Reed Army Medical Center and is interred at Arlington National Cemetery.

=== Advocacy for the elimination of nuclear weapons ===
In his later years, Goodpaster was vocal in advocating the reduction of nuclear weapons. Later his position evolved to advocating for elimination of all nuclear weapons. In September 1994, he commented, "Increasingly, nuclear weapons are seen to constitute a nuisance and a danger rather than a benefit or a source of strength." In 1996, along with General Lee Butler and Rear Admiral Eugene Carroll, Goodpaster co-authored a statement for the Global Security Institute advocating the complete elimination of nuclear weapons due to their danger and lack of military utility.

=== Civilian service ===
Goodpaster was a fellow at the Eisenhower Institute, and the Institute for Defense Analyses in Washington. He served on American Security Council and founded the Committee on the Present Danger, emphasizing the Soviet Union's military threat and a corresponding need for a strong defense for the United States.

He served as a trustee and a chairman of the George C. Marshall Foundation, which established the Andrew J. Goodpaster Award to honor, "American business leaders, politicians, military leaders and others who have served our nation in exemplary ways, who, like General Goodpaster, have exhibited great courage, selfless service, patriotism and leadership in their lives and careers." Among the recipients have been John P. Jumper, Raymond T. Odierno, Gordon R. Sullivan, and Brent Scowcroft.

For many years in retirement, Goodpaster was a trustee of St. Mary's College of Maryland, playing important roles in advancing the school to national prominence. A building on the school's campus, Goodpaster Hall, is named in his honor.

== Awards ==
- In January 1961, President Dwight D. Eisenhower awarded Goodpaster the Distinguished Service Medal for his work in the position of Staff Secretary to the President of the United States, and as Liaison Officer of the Department of Defense to the White House, 1954–1961, "for distinguished service in a position of grave responsibility." This award was mistakenly identified in the original press release as the Medal of Freedom. Goodpaster was actually awarded the Distinguished Service Medal at this ceremony—the press release is in error. Goodpaster's copy of the press release has the words "Medal of Freedom" lined out, and "Distinguished Service Medal" written over it. As a serving US Army officer at the time, Goodpaster could not have received the Medal of Freedom, a civilian award. Eisenhower mentioned that he was amazed that the award had been kept a surprise; Goodpaster later joked that if he had known about it, the paperwork would have been correct.
- At General Goodpaster's first retirement in 1974, President Gerald Ford awarded him the Defense Distinguished Service Medal.
- In 1984, President Ronald Reagan awarded Goodpaster the Presidential Medal of Freedom "for his contributions in the field of international affairs." This was the first and only award of this medal to Goodpaster.
- In 1985, he received the Golden Plate Award of the American Academy of Achievement presented by Awards Council member and Supreme Allied Commander Europe, General Bernard W. Rogers, USA.
- In 1992, he received the United States Military Academy Association of Graduates' Distinguished Graduate Award.

== Dates of rank ==
- Cadet, United States Military Academy - 1 July 1935
- 2nd Lieutenant, Regular Army (RA) - 12 June 1939
- 1st Lieutenant, Army of the United States (AUS) - 9 September 1940
- Captain, AUS - 1 February 1942
- 1st Lieutenant, Regular Army - 12 June 1942
- Major, AUS - 29 October 1942
- Lieutenant Colonel, AUS - 23 June 1943
- Captain, RA - 1 July 1948
- Major, RA - 14 May 1951
- Colonel, AUS - 10 September 1952
- Brigadier General, AUS - 1 January 1957
- Lieutenant Colonel, RA - 22 March 1957
- Major General, AUS - 1 August 1956
- Lieutenant General, AUS - 27 January 1964
- Colonel, RA - 12 June 1964
- Brigadier General, RA - 30 January 1966
- General, AUS - c. June 1968
- General, Retired List - c. December 1974

Note - During and after World War II officers with temporary commissions were commissioned in the Army of the United States (AUS) whereas permanent commissions were in the United States Army (i.e. the Regular Army).

== Works ==
Listed in reverse chronological order of date published:

- Goodpaster, Andrew J. and Rossides, Eugene. Greece's Pivotal Role in World War II and Its Importance to the U.S. Today. Washington, D.C.: American Hellenic Institute Foundation, 2001.
- Goodpaster, Andrew J. When Diplomacy Is Not Enough: Managing Multinational Military Interventions: A Report To The Carnegie Commission On Preventing Deadly Conflict. New York: Carnegie Commission on Preventing Deadly Conflict, 1996.
- Goodpaster, Andrew J. Gorbachev and the Future of East-West Security: A Response for the Mid-Term. Atlantic Council of the United States Occasional paper, April 1989.
- Goodpaster, Andrew J. et al. U. S. Policy Toward the Soviet Union. A Long-Term Western Perspective, 1987–2000. Lanham, MD: University Press of America, Lanham, MD, 1988.
- National Security and Détente. Foreword by General Andrew J. Goodpaster with contributions by faculty members of the U.S. Army War College. New York: Thomas Y. Crowell Company, Apollo Editions, 1987.
- Goodpaster, Andrew J. Strengthening Conventional Deterrence in Europe: A Program for the 1980s. Westview Special Studies in International Security (ISBN 0813370787). Boulder, Colorado: Westview Press, 1985.
- Goodpaster, Andrew J. and Elliot, Lloyd. Toward a Consensus on Military Service – Report of the Atlantic Council's Working Group on Military Service. Tarrytown, New York: Pergamon Press, 1982.
- Goodpaster, Andrew J. For the Common Defense. Lanham, MD: Lexington Books, 1977.
- Goodpaster, Andrew J. Civil-Military Relations: Studies in defense policy. Washington, D.C.: American Enterprise Institute for Public Policy Research, 1977.
- Goodpaster, Andrew J. and Huntington, Samuel P. Civil-Military Relations. University of Nebraska Press, Omaha: American Enterprise Institute for Public Policy Research, Washington D.C., 1977.
- Goodpaster, General Andrew J. SHAPE and Allied Command Europe In the Service of Peace and Security. 1973.

== See also ==
- List of Supreme Allied Commanders Europe (SACEUR)

Political offices
Preceded by Pete Carroll	White House Staff Secretary; 1954–1961	Succeeded by Bill Hartigan
Military offices
Preceded by Lyman Lemnitzer	Supreme Allied Commander Europe; 1969–1974	Succeeded by Alexander Haig
Preceded by Sidney Berry	Superintendent of the United States Military Academy; 1977–1981	Succeeded by Willard Scott
