= Bruce A. Kehrli =

American political aide

Bruce Kehrli

White House Staff Secretary
- In office January 1, 1972 – May 1974
- President: Richard Nixon
- Preceded by: Jon Huntsman Sr.
- Succeeded by: Jerry H. Jones

Personal details
- Born: July 11, 1944 Scranton, Pennsylvania, U.S.
- Died: May 12, 1996 (aged 51) Newport Beach, California, U.S.
- Party: Republican
- Education: Stanford University (BA); University of California, Los Angeles (MBA)

Bruce A. Kehrli (July 11, 1944 – May 12, 1996) was an American political aide who served as the White House Staff Secretary to President Richard Nixon from 1972 to 1974.

He died of multiple myeloma after a seven-year battle on May 12, 1996, in Newport Beach, California at age 51.
