= Ben Moss (attorney) =

American attorney

White House Staff Secretary
- Incumbent
- Assumed office September 2, 2026
- President: Donald Trump
- Preceded by: Will Scharf

Personal details
- Party: Republican
- Education: University of California, Santa Barbara (BA); University of Chicago (JD)

Benjamin Moss is an American attorney and political advisor who has served as the White House staff secretary since 2026.

== Education ==
He graduated from the University of Chicago Law School in 2018 with a Juris Doctor. At the University of Chicago, Moss was the president of the Jewish Law Students Association, the editor-in-chief of the Chicago Journal of International Law, and participated in the Texas Law Society, the Edmund Burke Society, and the Federalist Society.

== Career ==
After graduating from the University of Chicago, Moss worked as an appellate litigator at Vinson & Elkins. By January 2025, he had become Ohio senator JD Vance's general counsel. That month, Vance, then the vice president-elect, named him as his director of domestic policy. As Vance's director of domestic policy, he was involved in a meeting with Smithsonian Institution officials in which he criticized Amy Sherald's painting Trans Forming Liberty. By August 2026, Moss had become the deputy White House staff secretary.

== White House Staff Secretary ==
In August 2026, President Donald Trump named Moss as his White House staff secretary to succeed Will Scharf.

Political offices
Preceded by Will Scharf	White House Staff Secretary; 2026–present	Incumbent
