= James W. Cicconi =

American business executive, former government official and attorney

Jim Cicconi
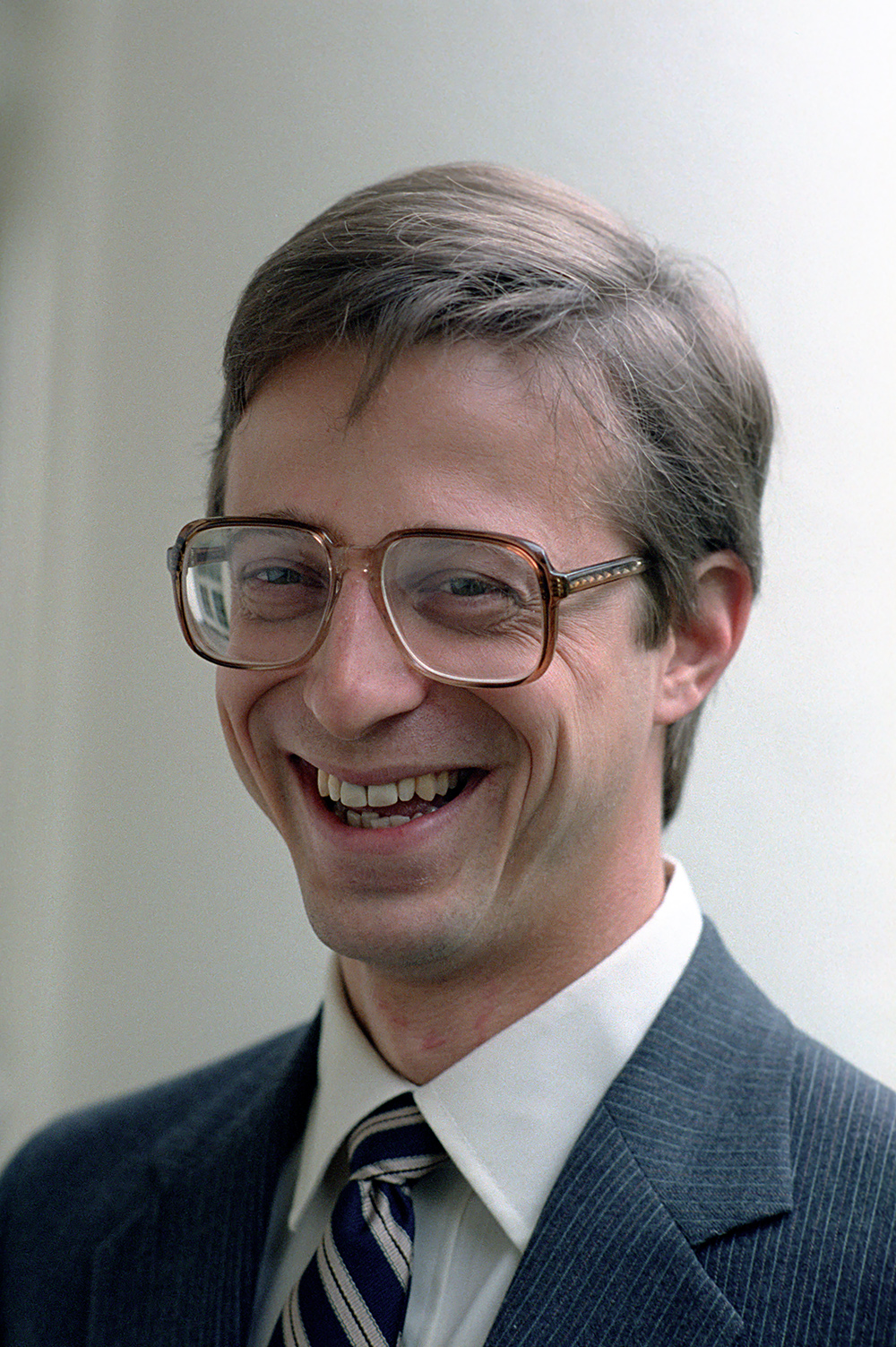

White House Staff Secretary
- In office January 20, 1989 – December 1990
- President: George H. W. Bush
- Preceded by: David L. Chew
- Succeeded by: Phillip D. Brady

Personal details
- Born: 1952 (age 73–74) Elmira, New York, U.S.
- Party: Republican
- Education: University of Texas, Austin (BA, JD)

James W. Cicconi is an American business executive, former government official, and attorney. He has served, since November 2005, as senior executive vice president of external and legislative affairs at AT&T Inc. Prior to 2005, from September 1998, he was executive vice president for law and government affairs and general counsel at AT&T Corp.

Cicconi served as assistant to the president and as Staff Secretary at the White House Office from 1989 to 1990 under George H. W. Bush. Prior, he served as special assistant to the president and as special assistant to Chief of Staff James Baker in the White House Office from 1981 to 1985 under Ronald Reagan.

Cicconi endorsed Democratic nominee Hillary Clinton during the 2016 elections out of dislike of the Republican nominee Donald Trump. In a statement, he said: “Hillary Clinton is experienced, qualified, and will make a fine president. The alternative, I fear, would set our nation on a very dark path.”
