= Willard Warren Scott Jr. =

United States Army general

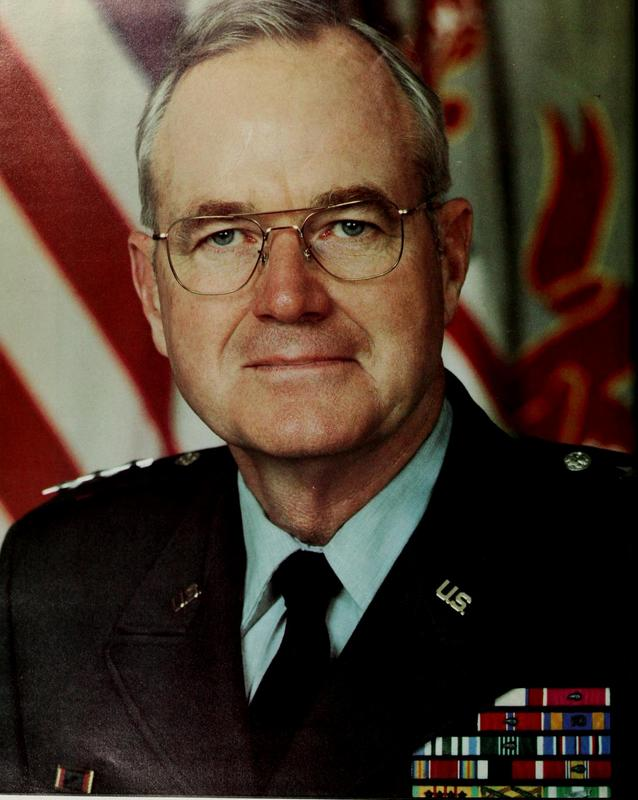
- Official portrait of Willard W. Scott Jr., Superintendent of the U.S. Military Academy
- Born: February 18, 1926; Fort Monroe, Virginia, U.S.
- Died: January 1, 2009 (aged 82); Alexandria, Virginia, U.S.
- Military career
- Allegiance: United States of America
- Branch: United States Army
- Service years: 1948 – 1986
- Rank: Lieutenant general
- Nickname: Scotty
- Commands: Superintendent, U.S. Military Academy; V Corps; 25th Infantry Division
- Conflicts: Cold War; Vietnam War
- Awards: Army Distinguished Service Medal; Legion of Merit (2); Bronze Star (2); Air Medal

Willard Warren Scott Jr. (February 18, 1926 – January 1, 2009) was a lieutenant general in the United States Army. He graduated from the United States Military Academy at West Point in 1948. He was commissioned upon his graduation from West Point and assigned to the artillery. He later went on to serve as superintendent of the United States Military Academy from 1981 through 1986.

== Biography ==
=== Early life ===
Born February 18, 1926, at Fort Monroe, Virginia. Willard Scott was the son of an Army Coastal Artillery officer Willard Warren Scott Sr. and Bernice Peck Scott [both buried at the Military Cemetery at The Presidio in San Francisco]. General Scott spent the early part of his life in San Francisco and, in fact, crossed the Golden Gate Bridge on the day it opened in 1937, leading a contingent of student crossing guards. He had 2 brothers Richard and Peter Scott. Before graduating from the military academy he met Justine Dorney of New Rochelle, New York. They were married in June 1948 and had 7 children. General Scott continued to be an ardent supporter of Army football and had the honor of having one of the mascot Army mules (General Scott or Scotty) named in his honor by a vote of the Association of Graduates.

=== Military career ===
General Scott received, throughout his military career, the Distinguished Service Medal, two Legions of Merit, two Bronze Stars, the Air Medal, the Joint Service Commendation Medal, and two Commendation Medals. Lt. Scott's first command was as Battery Commander, 5th Field Artillery Battalion, 1st Division in Europe, 1949–52 (commanding the Dog battery first commanded by Alexander Hamilton in the battle of Long Island in 1776). During the Vietnam War Colonel Scott was the deputy commander of the 2nd Field Force V Artillery, and Commander 23rd Artillery Group. Upon promotion to brigadier general he took over as Commanding General, MAC V Special Troops, 1970–72, Commanding General, 25th Infantry Division, 1976–78, and Commanding General, V Corps in Germany, 1980–81.

In 1981, Scott was selected to be the 52nd Superintendent of the U.S. Military Academy. He served as Superintendent until his retirement from the Army in 1986. After leaving the Army, General Scott served as the executive director of the Association of Military Colleges from 1988 through 1997.

General Scott was an honorary member of the Society of the Cincinnati.

Always active in the Catholic Church, Scott served as an extraordinary minister of Holy Communion, lector, and religious education teacher through his career and retirement. While at West Point, both as a cadet and superintendent, he attended mass daily.

Coincidentally, Willard W. Scott was a cadet at West Point at the same time as Winfield W. Scott, with Willard being two years senior to Winfield. While they share W. W. Scott as their abbreviated name, the two are not related. But both attained the rank of lieutenant general and both became service academy superintendents, with Willard being the superintendent at West Point through several of the same years that Winfield was superintendent at the United States Air Force Academy.

Only one of General Scott's 26 grandchildren has followed him into the U.S. Army. His grandson, Scott Aladar Rosenshein, son of Lawrence and Katie (née Scott) Rosenshein, was a member of the Class of 2009 of the United States Military Academy. Like his grandfather he was a member of the Army Lacrosse team and wore the #48 in honor of his grandfather (who was Class of 1948). In addition, two of General Scott's daughters, Mary and Susan, married West Pointers, Steven Starner and David Shanahan, respectively. Another daughter, Margaret, is an expert on Indonesia after having made several trips there a number of years ago.

Scott died on January 1, 2009, at his home in Alexandria, Virginia, from a form of Parkinson's disease.

=== Decorations ===
- Army Distinguished Service Medal
- Legion of Merit with oak leaf cluster
- Bronze Star with oak leaf cluster
- Air Medal
- Joint Service Commendation Medal
- Army Commendation Medal with oak leaf cluster

Military offices
Preceded by Andrew Jackson Goodpaster	Superintendents of the United States Military Academy; 1981–1986	Succeeded by Dave Richard Palmer
