= Phillip D. Brady =

American government official (born 1951)

Phillip Brady

White House Staff Secretary
- In office January 14, 1991 – January 20, 1993
- President: George H. W. Bush
- Preceded by: James W. Cicconi
- Succeeded by: John Podesta

White House Cabinet Secretary
- In office January 20, 1989 – June 26, 1989
- President: George H. W. Bush
- Preceded by: Nancy Risque
- Succeeded by: Steve Danzansky

Personal details
- Born: May 20, 1951 (age 75) Pasadena, California, U.S.
- Party: Republican
- Education: University of Notre Dame (BA); Loyola University, New Orleans (JD)

Phillip D. Brady (born May 20, 1951, in Pasadena, CA) was Assistant to the President and Staff Secretary in the White House from 1991 to 1993 under President George H. W. Bush, as well as General Counsel to the US Department of Transportation. He was formerly the President of the National Automobile Dealers Association.

== Early life ==
Brady, a cum laude graduate of both the University of Notre Dame in Indiana and Loyola University School of Law in New Orleans, practiced law in California before entering politics in Washington, D.C.

Political offices
Preceded by Nancy Risque	White House Cabinet Secretary; 1987–1989	Succeeded by Steve Danzansky
Preceded by James W. Cicconi	White House Staff Secretary; 1991–1993	Succeeded by John Podesta
