= Jerry H. Jones =

American political aide

Jerry Jones

White House Staff Secretary
- In office May 1974 – May 1975
- President: Richard Nixon; Gerald Ford
- Preceded by: Bruce A. Kehrli
- Succeeded by: James E. Connor

Director of the White House Presidential Personnel Office
- In office January 1973 – April 1974
- President: Richard Nixon
- Preceded by: Fred Malek
- Succeeded by: David Wimer

Personal details
- Born: June 13, 1939 (age 86) Lamesa, Texas, U.S.
- Education: Harvard University (BA, MBA)

Jerry H. Jones (born June 13, 1939) is an American political aide who served as White House Staff Secretary from 1974 to 1977 during the Ford Administration.

== Early life and education ==
Jones was born and raised in Lamesa, Texas, the son of two ranchers. He played football in high school until an injury ended his career. As a junior, he was accepted to a summer program at Phillips Exeter Academy and eventually graduated from the school. Jones earned a Bachelor of Arts in government from Harvard University and a Master of Business Administration from Harvard Business School.

== Career ==
After graduating from business school, Jones worked as a management consultant at McKinsey & Company in New York City. Jones later moved to Chicago to establish a small business, but lost it during the Nixon shock.

Through a friend from business school, Fred Malek, Jones helped restructure the White House Presidential Personnel Office during the Nixon Administration. Jones then worked for Nixon's 1972 re-election campaign. After the campaign, Jones returned to the Personnel Office amid the Watergate scandal. Jones became White House Staff Secretary in May 1974, and remained in the position upon the recommendation of Alexander Haig after Nixon resigned. The records Jones maintained during his tenure as Staff Secretary are housed at the Gerald R. Ford Presidential Library. For the remainder of Ford's tenure as president, Jones served as Special Assistant to the President and Director of the Office of Scheduling and Advance.

Jones later worked as Special Assistant to Secretary of Defense Donald Rumsfeld under President George W. Bush.
