= Timothy Kraft =

Political consultant

Tim Kraft
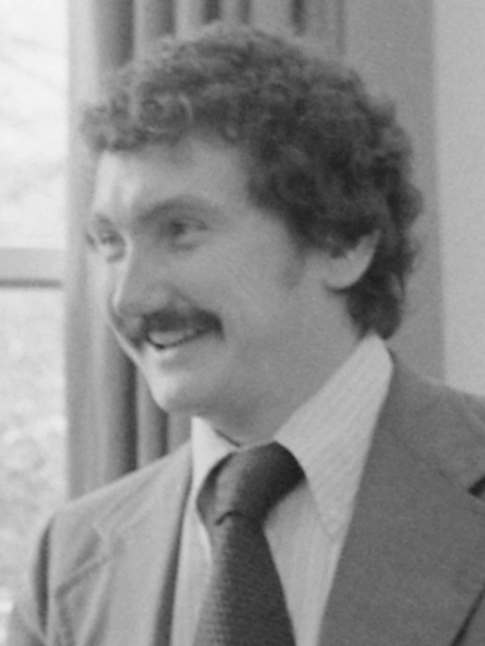

White House Director of Political Affairs
- In office April 28, 1978 – August 10, 1979
- President: Jimmy Carter
- Preceded by: Position established
- Succeeded by: Sarah Weddington

White House Appointments Secretary
- In office January 20, 1977 – April 28, 1978
- President: Jimmy Carter
- Preceded by: Warren S. Rustand
- Succeeded by: Phil Wise

Personal details
- Born: April 10, 1941 Noblesville, Indiana, U.S.
- Died: January 21, 2024 (aged 82) Albuquerque, New Mexico, U.S.
- Party: Democratic
- Spouse: Molly Kraft
- Education: Dartmouth College (BA); Georgetown University (attended)

Timothy E. Kraft (April 10, 1941 – January 21, 2024) was a Democratic political consultant, best known as the campaign manager for the unsuccessful reelection bid of U.S. President Jimmy Carter.

== Background ==
The son of a pediatrician, Kraft was born into a staunchly Democratic family in Noblesville, Indiana. He was raised in the then-Republican stronghold of Muncie, Indiana. In 1963, he graduated with a degree in government from Dartmouth College in Hanover, New Hampshire; from 1963 to 1965, he served in the Peace Corps in Guatemala. He worked part-time on the staff of U.S. Senator Birch Bayh of Indiana, a Carter primary opponent in 1976. In 1966 and 1967, Kraft engaged in graduate work in Latin American studies at Georgetown University in Washington, D.C. Thereafter, he was something of a political wanderer during the era of the Vietnam War.

== Political campaigns ==
Kraft first worked in a political campaign in 1970 on behalf of Jesse Unruh, the former Democratic Speaker of the California State Assembly, who failed to prevent the reelection of Ronald W. Reagan as governor of California, but later served as the California state treasurer. Kraft subsequently settled in New Mexico, where in the capital city of Santa Fe he became the executive director of the state Democratic Party. Though a paid position, he had to engage in the necessary fundraising to guarantee that he was indeed compensated. In 1974, Kraft worked to elect the liberal Jerry Apodaca as governor. Apodaca was running in a close contest against the conservative Republican Joe Skeen, later a long-term member of the United States House of Representatives. As the party executive director, Kraft met Carter, still the governor of Georgia, who came to New Mexico on Apodaca's behalf.

In 1975, he connected once again with Carter in the early stages of 1976 presidential campaign, of which he was the national field director and then the national field coordinator. He was regional coordinator for the 1975 Democratic national telethon. Kraft also worked to solicit campaign contributions from ten western states so that Carter could qualify for federal matching funds under the amended 1974 Federal Election Campaign Act. He was sent to organize the Iowa caucuses; though Carter finished second to "None of the Above", he was proclaimed by the national media as the winner in Iowa and went forward to key primary victories thereafter in New Hampshire, Florida, and Pennsylvania, where Kraft also played a leading role in assembling the Carter partisans to eliminate the challenge of U.S. Senator Henry M. Jackson of Washington state.

Kraft offered Bill Clinton, then the unopposed Democratic nominee for Arkansas attorney general, two years before his first election as governor of his native state, the management of the Texas campaign for Carter and running-mate Walter F. Mondale of Minnesota, but Clinton instead worked within Arkansas for Carter, who easily won Arkansas. Hillary Clinton became a deputy field director for Carter-Mondale.

After Carter unseated the non-elected incumbent, Gerald R. Ford, Jr., then of Michigan, he named Kraft as his appointments secretary, a post Kraft filled from 1977 to 1978. Then Kraft became an assistant to the president for personnel and political coordination. In 1980, he left the government position to manage Carter's national campaign against Ronald Reagan, who four years earlier had lost the Republican nomination to Gerald Ford. Some six weeks prior to the general election, Carter invoked the Ethics in Government Act of 1978 and retained Gerald J. Gallinghouse, a New Orleans Republican former U.S. Attorney for the United States District Court for the Eastern District of Louisiana, as the special prosecutor to investigate whether Kraft, who was known for his flamboyant life-style, had formerly used cocaine. The case against Kraft centered on his short-term predecessor as the 1980 campaign manager, Evan Dobelle, who claimed to have witnessed Kraft using the narcotic in 1978 in New Orleans. In 1981, Gallinghouse closed the case on the grounds that the "evidence did not warrant an indictment". Still Kraft was saddled with nearly $60,000 in unreimbursed legal expenses; later the Reagan administration obtained passage of a law that reimburses persons in such situations when cleared of wrongdoing, but the measure was not retroactive to cover Kraft. Similarly, another special prosecutor had earlier cleared the Carter chief of staff, Hamilton Jordan, of the same offense. Kraft and Jordan were close friends who had worked together from the beginning of the Carter national campaign. In 1980, Kraft, Jordan, and Patrick Caddell, the Carter pollster, had shared a house in the Georgetown section of Washington, D.C.

As the national campaign manager, Kraft was like Carter considered skilled in the details of politics; he organized the group known as the "Hispanic American Democrats" to increase the turnout of Hispanics, already Democratic in orientation but then known for less voter participation than the other minority groups. Working with Kraft was Robert Schwarz Strauss, a friend of U.S. Senator Lloyd M. Bentsen of Texas; Bentsen had also been a Carter primary rival in 1976. Strauss was in 1980 the chairman of the Democratic National Committee with responsibility for fund-raising and making the needed contacts with national party leaders and media representatives.

In the 1980s, through his company Avanti Ltd., Kraft became heavily involved as a consultant in political campaigns in Latin America, an area in which he had developed rapport while he was in the Peace Corps. In 2003, he appeared in the failed campaign of former Governor Howard Dean of Vermont, who was attempting to win the Democratic nomination in 2004 to deny Republican President George W. Bush a second term in the White House.

== Retirement ==
In 2004, Kraft lived in Corrales, New Mexico, also the home of former U.S. Senator Fred R. Harris of Oklahoma, another of the 1976 Democratic primary presidential candidates.

In 2008, Kraft was retired and lived with his wife, Molly, in Las Cruces, New Mexico. In an interview, Kraft said that he misses the excitement of politics and wishes that he could exert a role in ongoing campaigns. He wrote occasional columns for the Albuquerque Journal.

Kraft died in Albuquerque, New Mexico on January 21, 2024, at the age of 82.

Political offices
Preceded by Warren S. Rustand	White House Appointments Secretary; 1977–1978	Succeeded by Phil Wise
New office	White House Director of Political Affairs; 1978–1979	Succeeded by Sarah Weddington
