= Neera Tanden =

American political consultant (born 1970)

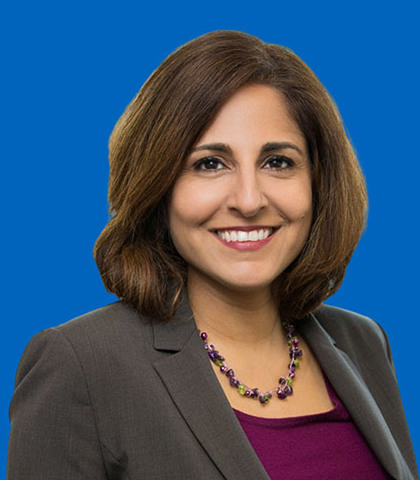
- Official portrait, 2021

23rd Director of the Domestic Policy Council
- In office May 26, 2023 – January 20, 2025
- President: Joe Biden
- Deputy: Zayn Siddique
- Preceded by: Susan Rice
- Succeeded by: Vince Haley

Senior Advisor to the President
- In office May 17, 2021 – May 25, 2023
- President: Joe Biden
- Preceded by: Jared Kushner; Stephen Miller; Ivanka Trump
- Succeeded by: Annie Tomasini

White House Staff Secretary
- In office October 25, 2021 – May 25, 2023
- President: Joe Biden
- Deputy: Michael Hochman
- Preceded by: Jessica Hertz
- Succeeded by: Stefanie Feldman

Personal details
- Born: September 10, 1970 (age 56) Bedford, Massachusetts, U.S.
- Party: Democratic
- Spouse: Ben Edwards (m. 1999)
- Children: 2
- Education: University of California, Los Angeles (BA); Yale University (JD)

Neera Tanden (born September 10, 1970) is an American political consultant, former government official, and the president and CEO of the Center for American Progress, a Democratic think tank. Tanden was director of the United States Domestic Policy Council from 2023 to 2025 and served as a senior advisor and staff secretary to President Joe Biden from 2021 to 2023. Tanden had a previous tenure as president of the Center for American Progress, where she worked in different capacities since its founding in 2003 until she joined the Biden administration in 2021.

Tanden has worked on several Democratic presidential campaigns, including those of Michael Dukakis in 1988, Bill Clinton in 1992, and Barack Obama in 2008. Tanden was a senior staffer to Hillary Clinton during her 2000 election to a United States Senate seat in New York, and during Clinton's tenure as a Senator. Tanden advised Clinton during her failed run to secure the 2008 Democratic nomination and later helped her defeat Bernie Sanders to win the nomination in 2016. In her government service with the Obama administration, Tanden helped draft the Affordable Care Act (ACA).

In November 2020, then President-elect Joe Biden announced he would nominate Tanden as Office of Management and Budget (OMB) director. However, Tanden asked for the nomination to be withdrawn after Senator Joe Manchin announced that he would not vote in favor of confirmation. In May 2021, Tanden was appointed as a senior advisor to the president, and was later named as White House Staff Secretary in October 2021.

In 2023, Tanden replaced Susan Rice as Director of the United States Domestic Policy Council. She served in this capacity until the end of the Biden administration.

== Early life and education ==
Neera Tanden was born on September 10, 1970, in Bedford, Massachusetts, to immigrant parents from India. She has a brother, Raj. Her parents divorced when she was five, after which Tanden's mother, Maya, was on welfare for nearly two years before obtaining a job as a travel agent. When she was nominated to lead the OMB in 2020, Tanden stated she was "mindful that my path in life would never have been possible without budgetary choices that reflected our nation’s values".

Tanden is a 1988 graduate of Bedford High School. She received a Bachelor of Arts degree from the University of California, Los Angeles, in 1992 and graduated from Yale Law School with a Juris Doctor in 1996. At Yale Law School, she was submissions editor for the Yale Law & Policy Review.

As a freshman at the University of California, Los Angeles, Tanden met her future husband, artist Benjamin Edwards. Edwards and Tanden both volunteered on Michael Dukakis's unsuccessful run for president in 1988. Tanden worked as a precinct leader in the Bel Air district of West Los Angeles where many households had already contributed to the Dukakis campaign.

== Career ==
Tanden has worked on domestic policy on Capitol Hill, in think tanks, and for various Democratic senatorial and presidential campaigns.

=== Work with the Clintons ===
Tanden has been regarded as a Clinton loyalist and personal friend of Hillary Clinton, whose professional life has been significantly defined by her work with the Clintons. The New Republic has described Tanden as Hillary Clinton's closest policy adviser.

She worked with President Bill Clinton's campaign on new energy policies, and health-care reform, as associate director for domestic policy in the Clinton White House, and as a domestic policy advisor in the First Lady's Office.

In 2016, Bruce Reed, a Democratic political operative, said Tanden played a role in implementing Clinton's welfare reform bill, the Personal Responsibility and Work Opportunity Act, signed in 1996. Tanden denied the claim and in response posted a screenshot of what she claimed was an email from Reed.

In 1999 and 2000, Tanden was deputy campaign manager and policy director for Hillary Clinton during her successful senatorial campaign in New York. After the election, Tanden served as Senator Clinton's legislative director from 2003 to 2005.

Tanden was Hillary Clinton's policy director for Clinton's failed bid for the 2008 Democratic presidential nomination. In a 2019 article, the New York Times cited a source claiming that Tanden punched ThinkProgress website editor and future Bernie Sanders 2020 presidential campaign manager Faiz Shakir in the chest for asking Clinton about her Iraq War vote. Tanden later insisted that she had not "slugged" him but had pushed him.

Tanden was an unpaid adviser to Clinton's successful 2016 primary season nomination campaign and failed general election campaign in opposition to Republican candidate Donald Trump, while also running the Center for American Progress. After Hillary Clinton secured the Democratic nomination for president in 2016, Tanden was named to her transition team. Tanden was considered a candidate for a top White House job, had Clinton won the presidency.

In early 2016, a spear-fishing attack on Clinton's campaign chairman John Podesta obtained access to his private emails, which included exchanges with Tanden. On October 7, 2016, 30 minutes after the Access Hollywood tape was first published, WikiLeaks announced via Twitter that it was making available online thousands of emails from Podesta's Gmail account. Tanden called the release of her personal communications, which often feature her blunt private assessments, a painful experience to endure. In one exchange, on August 11, 2015, while discussing news that Harvard University law professor Lawrence Lessig was exploring a bid for the Democratic nomination, Tanden wrote of Lessig, "I fucking hate that guy." Lessig responded to the incident by saying that while he supported whistle blowing and a pardon of Edward Snowden, Tanden should not have to be burdened with having her private emails scrutinized and that it was not in the public interest.

In 2016, blogger Matt Bruenig, a supporter of Bernie Sanders, was fired from the think tank Demos after tweets that called Tanden and Joan Walsh "geriatrics" and Tanden "Scumbag Neera". Demos cited a past pattern of "online harassment of people with whom he disagrees" as the reason for his dismissal, but some commentators suggested Tanden was involved in his firing, allegations she denied.

=== 2008 Obama general election campaign ===
After Barack Obama was nominated as the Democratic presidential candidate, Tanden was one of the first, and also one of the few former-Clinton campaign staffers to join his team. She was domestic policy director for his successful general election campaign.

=== Obama administration ===
Tanden served in the Obama administration as senior adviser to Secretary Kathleen Sebelius of the Department of Health and Human Services. She helped to draft the administration's health care legislation, including work specific to its proposed, but later withdrawn, public option. She also negotiated with Congress and stakeholders on several provisions of the bill. She has been described as one of the "key architects" of the Affordable Care Act.

=== Center for American Progress ===
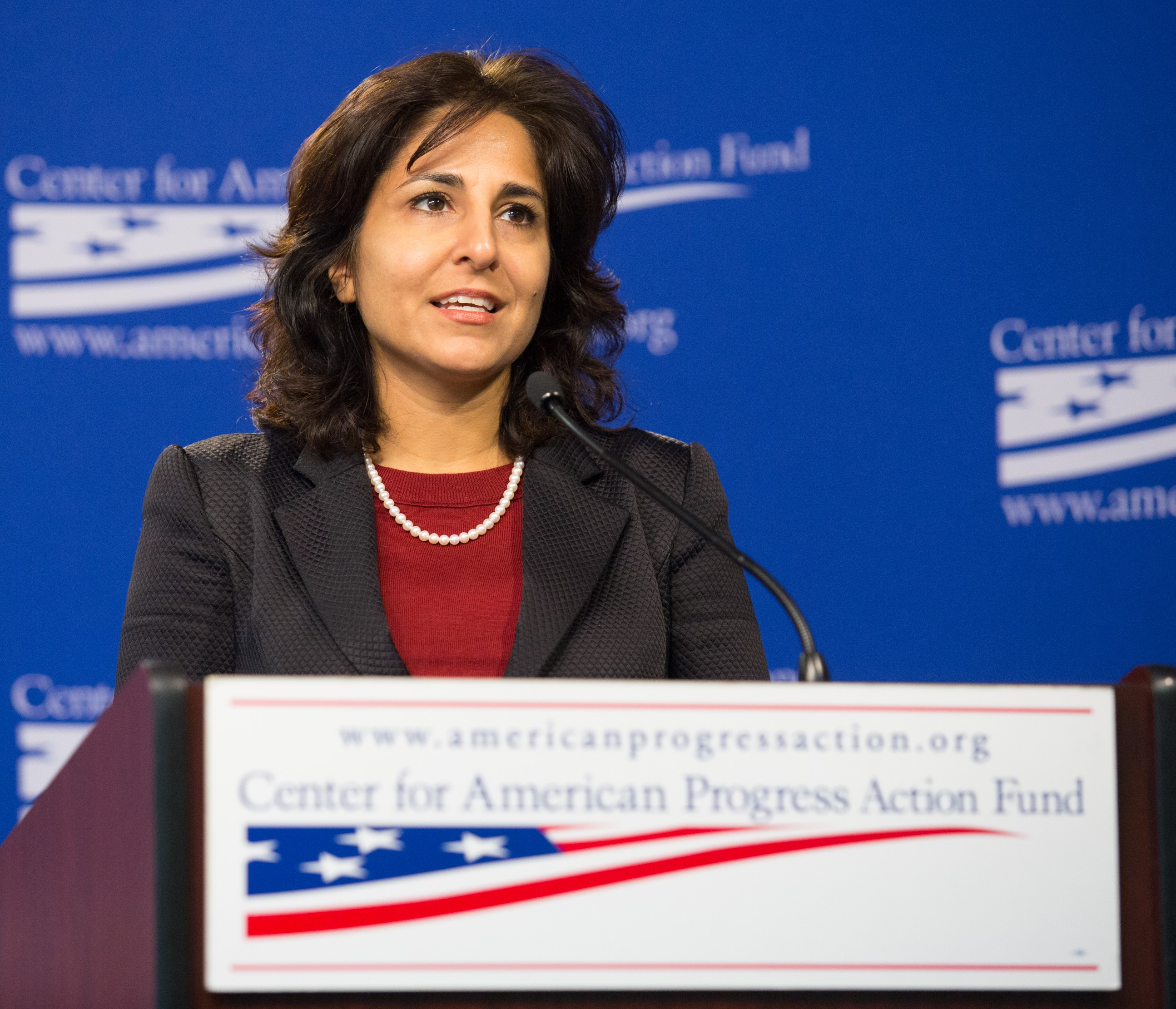
Tanden speaking in 2013 on behalf of the Center for American Progress

In 2003, Tanden had a central role in the founding of the Center for American Progress (CAP). Tanden worked as Senior Vice President for Domestic Policy, while also serving as Senior Vice President for Academic Affairs and, starting in 2010, as Chief Operating Officer.

On November 1, 2011, Tanden succeeded John Podesta as CAP's president and CEO.

After the 2016 election and Clinton's loss, Tanden refocused the work of the Center for American Progress, aiming to have the think tank, and especially its advocacy arm (the Center for American Progress Action Fund), serve as a "central hub for Trump resistance" as well as playing a leading role in shaping the healthcare debate within the Democratic Party. In 2020, the group promoted their "Medicare Extra for All" plan, made as a counter to Medicare for All which, despite the name, did not call for as much coverage. The idea was widely panned by progressive activists, but largely formed the basis for the healthcare plan provided by Beto O'Rourke's 2020 presidential campaign.

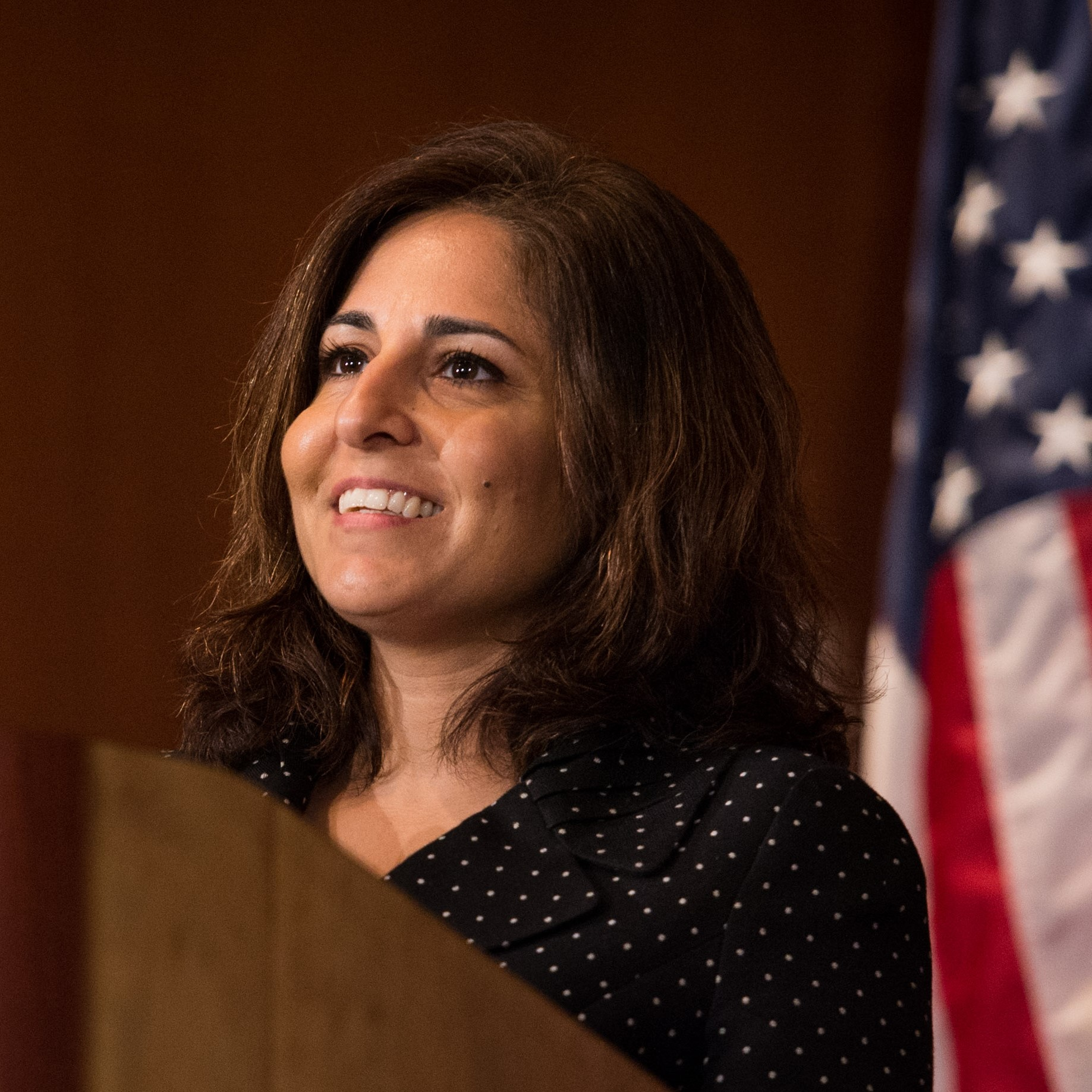
Tanden as CAP president

In 2018, following reports by BuzzFeed News of sexual harassment and retaliation allegations within CAP, Tanden revealed to a meeting of CAP's entire staff the first name of an employee who had anonymously accused a manager of sexual harassment, leading many people in the room to gasp. The employee told BuzzFeed that Tanden did not have permission to share her name. Tanden later apologized.

On April 28, 2020, Tanden was named to New Jersey Governor Phil Murphy's Restart and Recovery Commission. The commission was tasked with preparing the state to reopen after its COVID-19 lockdown.

In 2021, after having been named a Biden advisor, Tanden stepped down from her leadership of CAP, with Patrick Gaspard taking over her roles as president and CEO. In February 2025, Tanden returned to CAP as president and CEO.

=== Biden administration ===
==== Office of Management and Budget nomination ====
On November 30, 2020, President-elect Joe Biden introduced Tanden as his nominee for Director of the Office of Management and Budget. Immediately afterwards, Tanden deleted over 1,000 of her previous tweets, and changed her Twitter bio from "progressive" to "liberal". During the confirmation hearing, Tanden apologized for several of her tweets attacking Republican senators, including tweets calling Susan Collins "the worst", comparing Ted Cruz to vampires, and using the nickname "Moscow Mitch" for Mitch McConnell and comparing him to Lord Voldemort. Senator John Cornyn described Tanden as "radioactive" in contrast to other Biden nominees he felt were more acceptable. Senator John Kennedy stated that she "called Senator Sanders everything but an ignorant slut", a reference to a 1970s Saturday Night Live catch phrase. NPR described her as "Biden's most controversial Cabinet pick".

Many members of the 2016 and 2020 Bernie Sanders presidential campaigns, such as Briahna Joy Gray, as well as other progressives have been strongly critical of Tanden and were vocally opposed to her nomination. Paco Fabián, communications director for Our Revolution, called the choice of Tanden "certainly not a unity pick" and said "it's not a secret that progressives and Neera Tanden haven't gotten along over the last few years on several issues." Politico described her nomination as "the equivalent of rubbing salt in the wound".

In February 2021, Senator Joe Manchin said he opposed her nomination due to "overtly partisan statements" in the past, putting her approval in doubt due to the 50–50 split in the Senate between both parties. Other senators, including Susan Collins, Rob Portman, Mitt Romney, and Pat Toomey said they would also vote against Tanden's nomination. Collins argued that Tanden's deletion of over 1,000 of her tweets "raises concerns about her commitment to transparency". Some senators remained undecided after meeting with Tanden, including Lisa Murkowski, Bernie Sanders, and Kyrsten Sinema. The Biden administration originally stood by her nomination publicly, but other candidates for the position began to be considered after Manchin's opposition became public. Conservative commentator Hugh Hewitt asked Senate Republicans to forgive her and approve the nomination, but none indicated they would do so. Senate panels which were set to vote on her nomination postponed consideration.

On March 2, 2021, in response to a request from Tanden, the Biden administration withdrew Tanden's nomination to head the Office of Management and Budget. The White House also made public Tanden's explanation, which read in part, "Unfortunately, it now seems clear that there is no path forward to gain confirmation, and I do not want continued consideration of my nomination to be a distraction from your other priorities." President Biden said he had the “utmost respect” for Tanden and pledged he would find a role for her somewhere in his administration. On March 25, 2021, her nomination was officially withdrawn.

==== Senior advisor and Staff Secretary ====
Tanden was appointed as a senior advisor to President Biden on May 14, 2021. In this role, Tanden planned for possible policy changes awaiting a Supreme Court decision on Republican challenges to Obamacare and initiated a review of the United States Digital Service. According to analysis by Politico, Tanden may have more influence in the role of senior advisor than she would have had as OMB Director, as this role would allow her to be included in daily presidential briefings.

In October 2021, Tanden was named President Biden's staff secretary and senior advisor, reporting to Ron Klain. On June 24, 2025, in sworn testimony to the House Committee on Oversight and Government Reform, which was investigating former President Joe Biden's alleged cognitive decline during his four years in office, Tanden acknowledged that she controlled Biden's autopen, but said she did not make the final decisions about which documents or orders it was used to sign.

In May 2023, Tanden was named as the head of the Domestic Policy Council, replacing Susan Rice. She served in this capacity until the end of the Biden administration.

== Political views ==
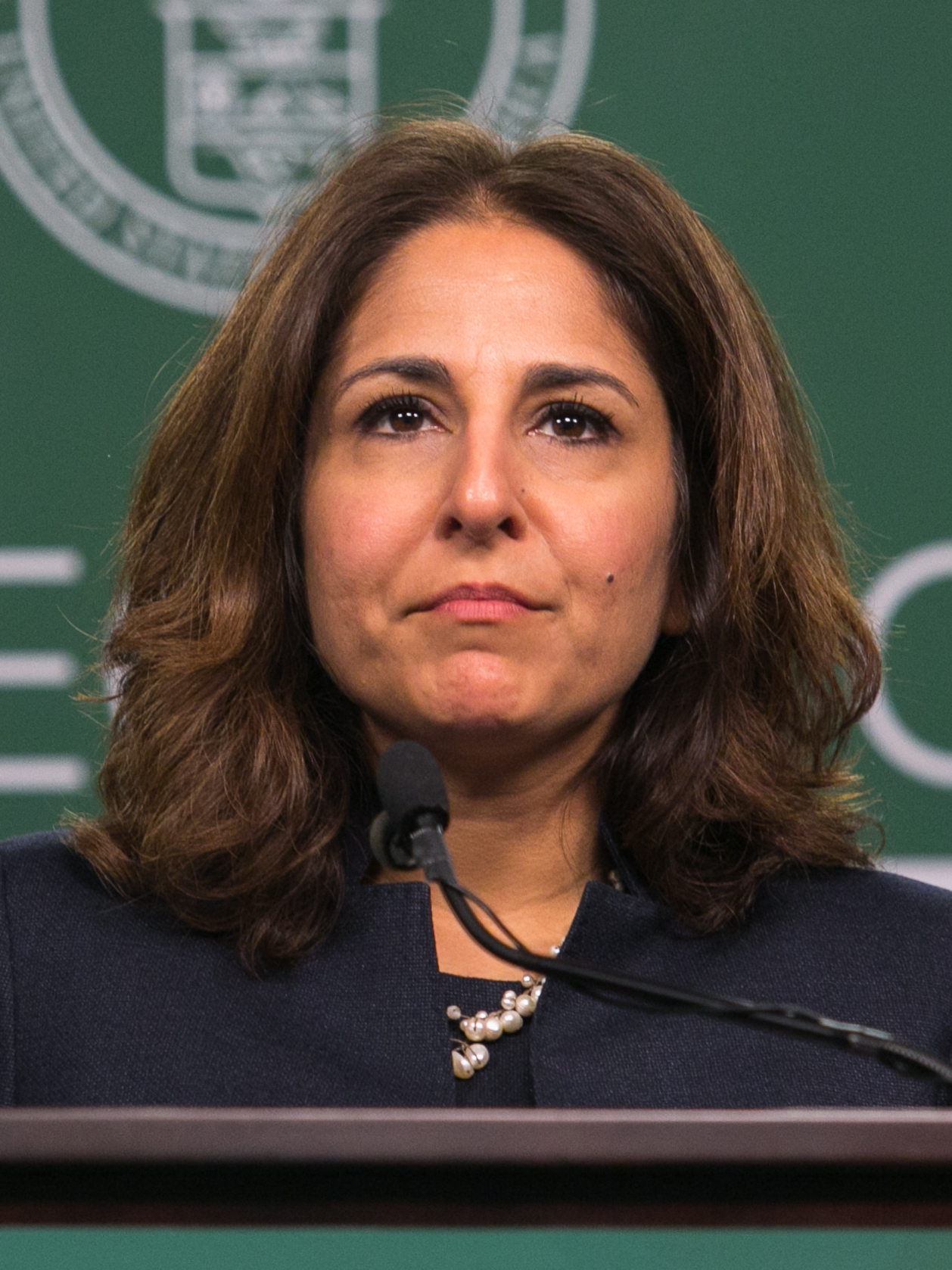
Tanden in 2016

Tanden has been described by The Washington Post as a "progressive", by Business Insider as a "centrist", and by Vox as "one of the more liberal members of Clintonland". She is regarded as a loyalist and confidante of Bill and Hillary Clinton. She credits her experiences growing up relying on government assistance as the reason she has entered politics and the motivator of her career. She is known for her outspoken and prolific Twitter presence, where she has criticized lawmakers both to her political left and right. Senator Bernie Sanders wrote a letter in 2019 accusing Tanden of "maligning my staff and supporters and belittling progressive ideas".

In 2019, Tanden welcomed the arrest of WikiLeaks founder Julian Assange, accusing him of being "the agent of a proto fascist state, Russia, to undermine democracy."

=== Domestic policy ===
Much of Tanden's work relates to healthcare policy in America. She worked on the passage of the Affordable Care Act (ACA, or "Obamacare") during the Obama administration. Tanden supports a multi-payer universal healthcare system, and opposes single-payer healthcare, including Medicare for All proposals.

Tanden has argued that cuts to social welfare programs, including cuts to Social Security, Medicaid, and Medicare, should be considered as a part of long term deficit reduction. During her presidency, the Center for American Progress (CAP) has advocated for pegging periodic increases in Social Security benefits to the chained Consumer Price Index or chained CPI, which would regress the program to more austere accounting methods to help its beneficiaries keep pace with inflation.

Tanden has been a critic of the policy proposals and supporters of U.S. Senator and former presidential candidate Bernie Sanders. During the 2016 Democratic Party presidential primaries, she opposed Sanders's signature proposals of a $15 per hour minimum wage and single-payer healthcare. However, she expressed support for the Fight for $15 movement in 2017. Tanden is a supporter of the labor movement, stating that a "strong labor movement motivates non-union businesses to provide their employees with salaries and benefits that are comparable to those of unionized workplaces."

=== Foreign policy ===
Tanden has been described as "hawkish". In September 2013, Tanden tweeted that "an unpoliced world is dangerous." The Center for American Progress has been described as having close ties to Israel, Saudi Arabia and the United Arab Emirates. In 2016, she met India's Prime Minister Narendra Modi. In 2020, however, Tanden criticized Modi's government for permitting a climate of violence against Muslims in India.

==== Israel ====
In 2015, Tanden and CAP criticized Israeli Prime Minister Benjamin Netanyahu for engaging in what they called hyper-partisan activity during his trip to Washington, D.C., to lobby against the Obama-backed Joint Comprehensive Plan of Action. When Netanyahu visited D.C. again later in the year, he requested an audience with CAP. Tanden agreed to Netanyahu's request, saying it would be hypocritical to do otherwise, adding the event would include a question and answer segment between attendees and the prime minister. Tanden's decision drew harsh criticism from progressive organizations, many of whom said she was giving Netanyahu "legitimacy" by allowing him to speak before a group like CAP. Tanden responded by saying, "It was not an easy decision but at the end of the day we are a think tank. He's the leader of a country with which the US has a very strong relationship. There are issues we care about in Israel and the region. So we agreed to hold a forum."

She called the U.S. recognition of Israel's annexation of the Golan Heights in March 2019 as "a blatant political move" to benefit Netanyahu.

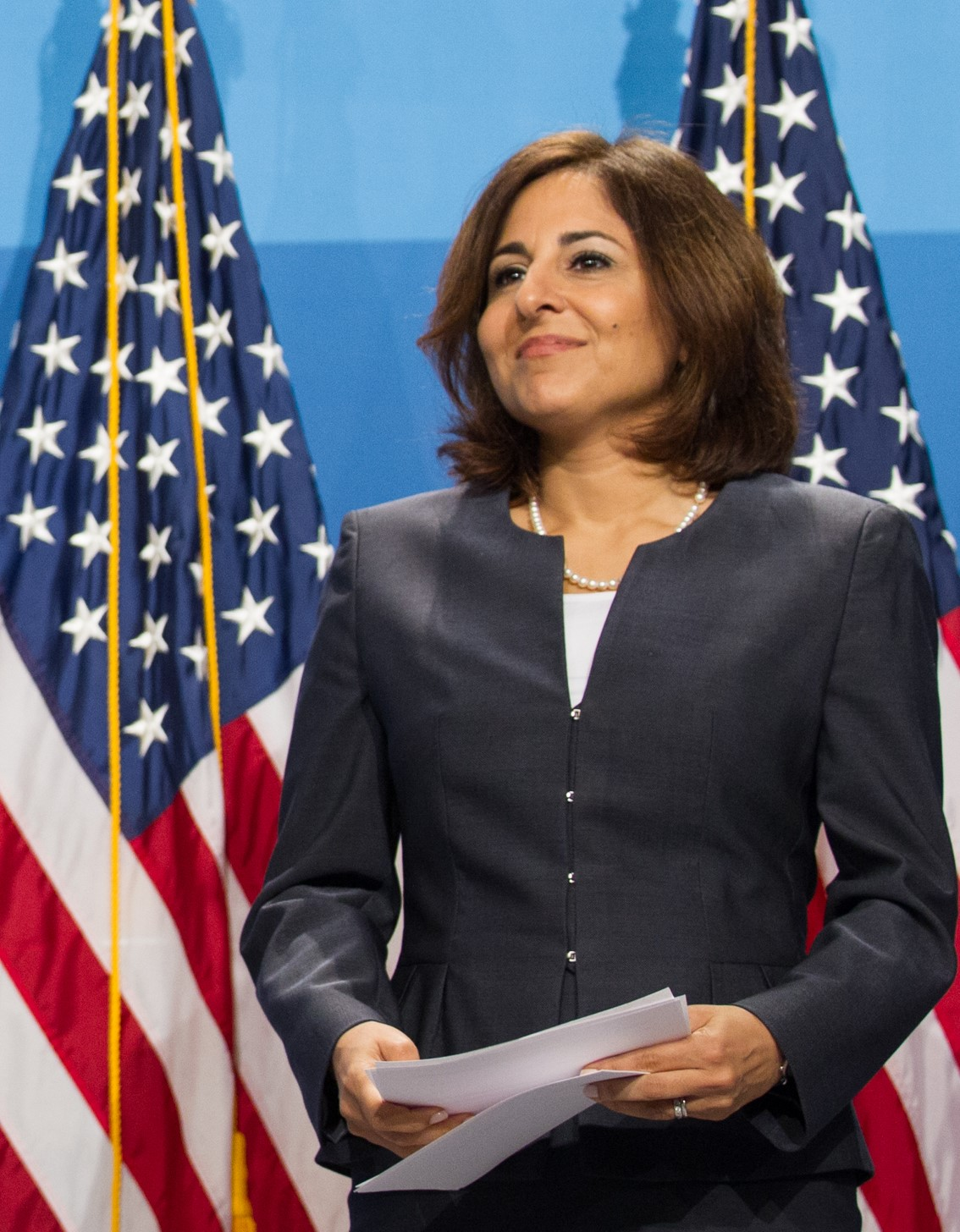
Tanden in 2014

==== Libya ====
Before the U.S.–NATO bombing of Libya, Tanden tweeted her support for Gaddafi's removal.

In October 2011, Tanden said (in a private email leaked to The Intercept) that the US had "a giant deficit" and it "doesn't seem crazy" to have "oil rich" nations such as Libya "partially pay [the US] back" for intervention. Tanden said this would be preferable to cuts to Head Start, WIC or Medicaid. Journalist Glenn Greenwald described Tanden's comments as similar to Donald Trump's 2011 statements on Iraq's national oil resources: "I say we should take it and pay ourselves back."

==== Syria ====
In September 2013, when President Obama was considering bombing Syria, Tanden tweeted: "On Syria, while I don't want to be the world's policeman, an unpoliced world is dangerous. The U.S. may be the only adult in the room left." However in 2016 Tanden said she was opposed to deploying U.S. soldiers to Syria.

== Honors ==
- 2012: National Journal named one of the 25 "Most Influential Women in Washington"
- 2013: Fortune named Tanden one of the "Most Powerful Women in Politics"
- 2014: Elle named Tanden one of the 10 most powerful women in Washington, D.C.
- 2016: Politico named Tanden to its "Politico 50" list of "thinkers, doers, and visionaries transforming American politics"

== Personal life ==
Tanden and her husband, Benjamin Edwards, have two children.

== See also ==
- Unsuccessful nominations to the Cabinet of the United States

Non-profit organization positions
Preceded by John Podesta	President of the Center for American Progress; 2011–2021	Succeeded by Patrick Gaspard
Political offices
Preceded by Jessica Hertz	White House Staff Secretary; 2021–2023	Succeeded by Stefanie Feldman
Preceded by Susan Rice	Director of the Domestic Policy Council; 2023–2025	Succeeded by Vince Haley
