= White House Office of the Staff Secretary =

Unit within the U.S. president's office

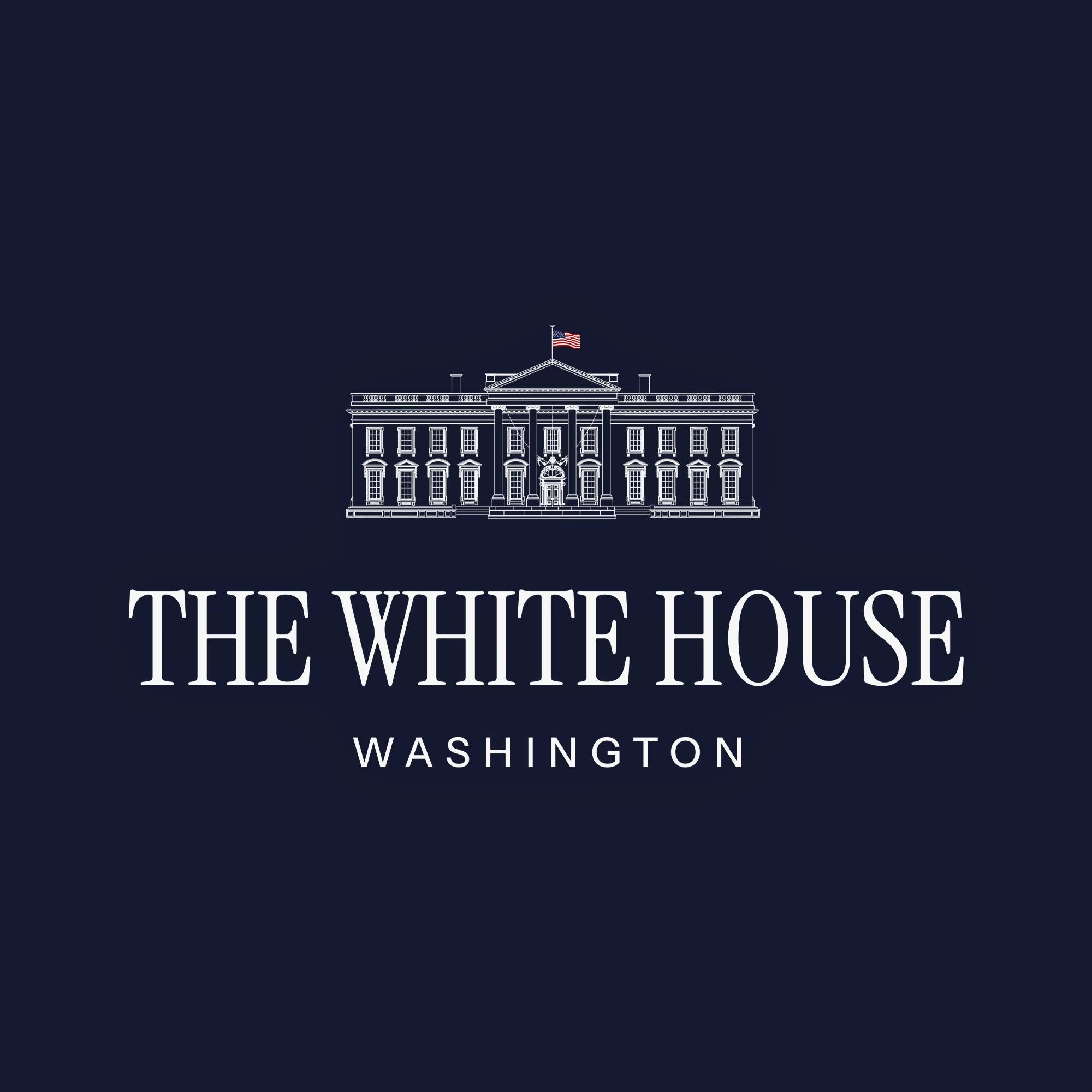

Agency overview
- Formed: 1953; 73 years ago
- Headquarters: West Wing, White House Washington, D.C., U.S.; 38.8975°N 77.0376°W
- Agency executive: Ben Moss, Staff Secretary
- Parent department: White House Office

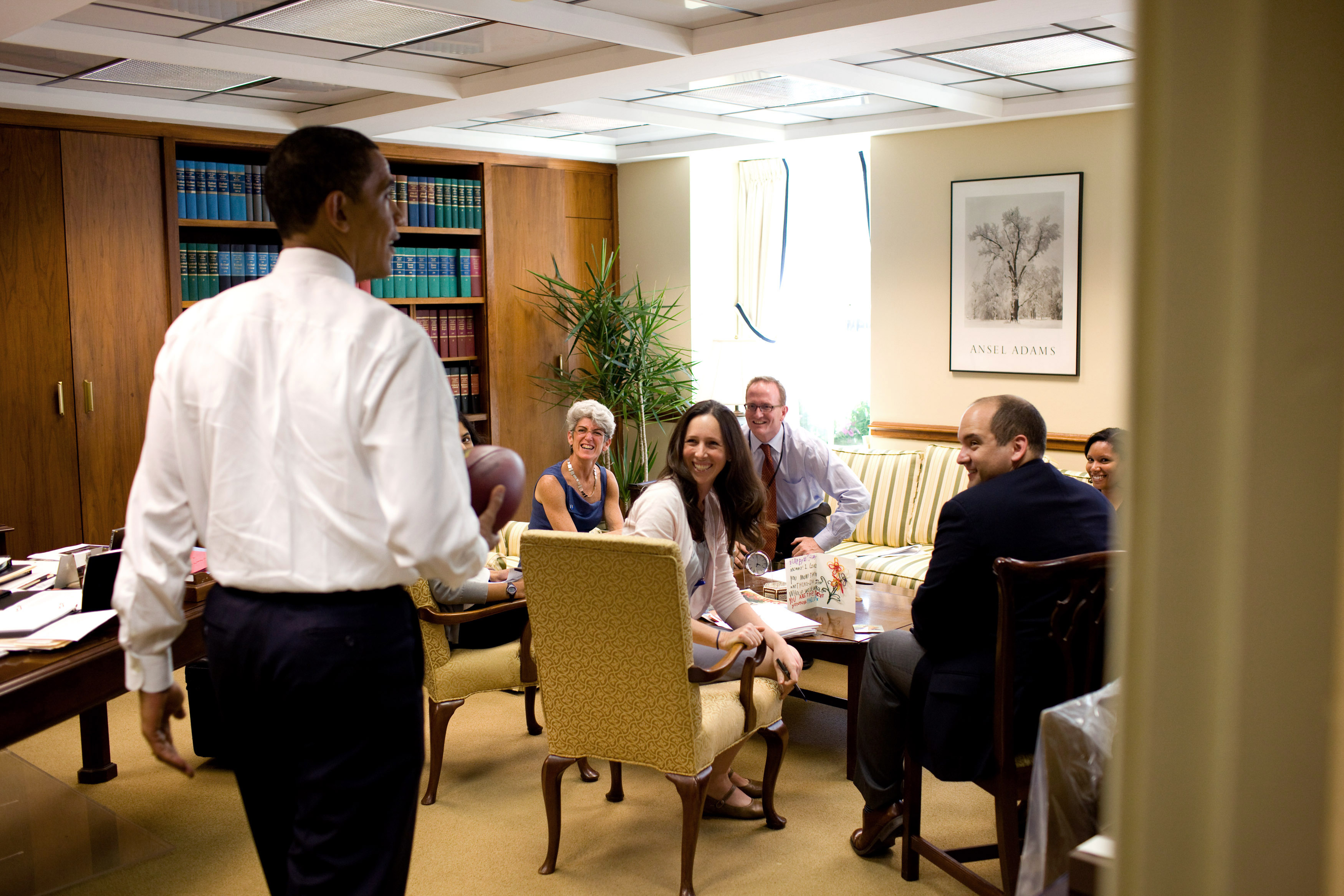
President Barack Obama surprises members of the Office of the Staff Secretary in the West Wing of the White House during an impromptu drop-by visit on May 21, 2009.

The staff secretary ("staff sec") is a position in the White House Office responsible for managing paper flow to the president and circulating documents among senior staff for comment. It has been referred to as "the nerve center of the White House." Specifically, the Office of the Staff Secretary decides which decision memos, briefing materials, lists of potential nominees, briefing books, intelligence reports, schedules, correspondence, and speech drafts end up on the president's desk, as well as how and when the president will receive them. The staff secretary also works with senior White House staff to edit all of these materials and ensure they are ready for the president's consumption.

The Office of the Staff Secretary is generally composed of a staff secretary, a deputy staff secretary, and several associate staff secretaries. The Office of the Staff Secretary, along with its sub-offices—the Office of the Executive Clerk, the Office of Records Management, and the Office of Presidential Correspondence—is the largest of the White House offices.

The current staff secretary is Ben Moss.

== Function ==
Due to the high volume of important memos, meetings and decisions generated for the president's attention, the staff secretary is tasked with deciding which papers should go to the president's desk—and when the paper should be sent to him. These documents range from presidential decision memos and bills passed by Congress to drafts of speeches and samples of correspondence. The staff secretary relies on close coordination with Oval Office Operations and the Scheduling Office to decide when and how the president would like to receive documents.

The staff secretary's principal role is to review the incoming papers and determine which issues must reach the president. Secondary to this, the staff secretary determines who else in the administration should comment on the issue to give the president a full picture of the situation. The staff secretary then compiles the documents with the relevant commentary for the president's consumption.

Historically, the position of staff secretary carries significant influence over executive decision-making by managing the flow of information to the president and coordinating the policy review process among advisors.

The staff secretary or a designated assistant staff secretary always accompanies the president on any work-related travel.

== History ==
The position was established under President Dwight D. Eisenhower in 1953, one of the recommendations of the Hoover Commission (Commission on the Organization of the Executive Branch). Under Eisenhower, the first staff secretaries focused particularly on screening national security communications; in this role, Colonel Andrew J. Goodpaster was thought to overshadow the president's special assistant for national security.

With the appointment of businessman Jon Huntsman, Sr., as staff secretary in the Richard Nixon White House, the role was vastly expanded to absorb the functions of the Office of Management and Administration. These new roles included personnel management, finance and operations, services (such as access to the White House Mess and limousine fleet), facilities and furniture, and oversight of the Executive Clerk and Visitors Office.

Almost all of these responsibilities—as well as Presidential Correspondence—were spun off during the Carter administration into the newly created Office of Administration.

During the Reagan administration the Offices of the Staff Secretary and the Executive Clerk were reunited with Presidential Correspondence in a configuration that has remained fairly consistent through the subsequent presidencies.

President Trump's second White House chief of staff, John F. Kelly, reiterated the importance of the role of the staff secretary in managing the flow of information around the White House. His decision to allow a staff secretary with only an interim security clearance has been criticized.

== Key staff ==
- White House Staff Secretary: Ben Moss
- Senior Associate Staff Secretary: Venetia Resciniti
- Assistant Staff Secretary and Operations Manager: Kristen J. Pettit
- Assistant Staff Secretary: Kathleen M. Bruce

== List of staff secretaries ==
Image	Name	Start	End	President
	Pete Carroll	January 20, 1953	September 17, 1954	Dwight D. Eisenhower (1953–1961)
	Andrew Goodpaster	October 1954	January 20, 1961	Dwight D. Eisenhower (1953–1961)
	Bill Hartigan	January 20, 1961	August 4, 1961	John F. Kennedy (1961–1963)
	Ken Cole	January 20, 1969	November 1969	Richard Nixon (1969–1974)
	John Brown	November 1969	February 22, 1971	Richard Nixon (1969–1974)
	Jon Huntsman	February 22, 1971	January 1, 1972	Richard Nixon (1969–1974)
	Bruce Kehrli	January 1, 1972	May 1974	Richard Nixon (1969–1974)
	Jerry Jones	May 1974	May 1975	Richard Nixon (1969–1974)
	Jerry Jones	May 1974	May 1975	Gerald Ford (1974–1977)
	Jim Connor	June 1975	January 20, 1977	Gerald Ford (1974–1977)
	Richard Hutcheson	January 20, 1977	January 20, 1981	Jimmy Carter (1977–1981)
	David Gergen	January 20, 1981	June 17, 1981	Ronald Reagan (1981–1989)
	Dick Darman	June 17, 1981	February 1, 1985	Ronald Reagan (1981–1989)
	David Chew	February 1, 1985	April 1987	Ronald Reagan (1981–1989)
	Rhett Dawson	April 1987	Fall 1988	Ronald Reagan (1981–1989)
	Jim Cicconi	January 20, 1989	December 1990	George H. W. Bush (1989–1993)
	Phillip Brady	January 14, 1991	January 20, 1993	George H. W. Bush (1989–1993)
	John Podesta	January 20, 1993	June 30, 1995	Bill Clinton (1993–2001)
	Todd Stern	June 30, 1995	March 11, 1998	Bill Clinton (1993–2001)
	Phillip Caplan	March 11, 1998	Spring 1999	Bill Clinton (1993–2001)
	Sean Patrick Maloney	September 14, 1999	January 20, 2000	Bill Clinton (1993–2001)
	Lisel Loy	2000	January 20, 2001	Bill Clinton (1993–2001)
	Harriet Miers	January 20, 2001	June 6, 2003	George W. Bush (2001–2009)
	Brett Kavanaugh	June 6, 2003	May 30, 2006	George W. Bush (2001–2009)
	Raul Yanes	June 3, 2006	January 20, 2009	George W. Bush (2001–2009)
	Lisa Brown	January 20, 2009	January 30, 2011	Barack Obama (2009–2017)
	Raj De	January 30, 2011	April 2012	Barack Obama (2009–2017)
	Douglas Kramer	April 2012	February 2013	Barack Obama (2009–2017)
	Joani Walsh	2014	January 20, 2017	Barack Obama (2009–2017)
	Rob Porter	January 20, 2017	February 7, 2018	Donald Trump (2017–2021)
	Derek Lyons	February 7, 2018	June 6, 2018	Donald Trump (2017–2021)
	Derek Lyons	June 6, 2018	December 18, 2020	Donald Trump (2017–2021)
	Jessica Hertz	January 20, 2021	October 22, 2021	Joe Biden (2021–2025)
	Neera Tanden	October 25, 2021	May 26, 2023	Joe Biden (2021–2025)
	Stefanie Feldman	May 26, 2023	January 20, 2025	Joe Biden (2021–2025)
	Will Scharf	January 20, 2025	September 1, 2026	Donald Trump (2025–present)
	Ben Moss	September 2, 2026	present	Donald Trump (2025–present)
