= Derek Lyons =

American attorney and political advisor

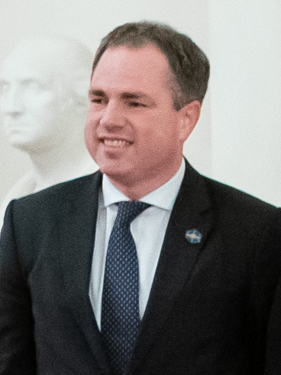
- Lyons in 2020

Counselor to the President
- In office May 20, 2020 – December 18, 2020 Serving with Hope Hicks
- President: Donald Trump
- Preceded by: Johnny DeStefano
- Succeeded by: Steve Ricchetti; Jeff Zients

White House Staff Secretary
- In office February 7, 2018 – December 18, 2020; Acting: February 7, 2018 – June 6, 2018
- President: Donald Trump
- Preceded by: Rob Porter
- Succeeded by: Jessica Hertz

White House Deputy Staff Secretary
- In office January 20, 2017 – June 6, 2018
- President: Donald Trump
- Leader: Rob Porter
- Preceded by: Jesse Gurman
- Succeeded by: Catherine Bellah Keller

Personal details
- Party: Republican
- Education: Duke University (BA, BS); Harvard University (JD)

Derek S. Lyons is an American attorney and former White House Staff Secretary and Counselor to the President in the first administration of U.S. President Donald Trump.

== Education ==
Lyons was a student of Strake Jesuit College Preparatory, from which he graduated in 2000. He went to Duke University, where he earned a Bachelor of Science and Bachelor of Arts in 2004.

In June 2007, Lyons was a student of Harvard Law School and worked as a Summer Associate at Gibson, Dunn & Crutcher. Lyons graduated with a Juris Doctor in 2008.

== Career ==
In 2007 Lyons was admitted to the State Bar of Texas and the Bars of the District of Columbia and Federal Circuit in 2010. He started his professional career as a law clerk to Brett Kavanaugh, a former judge serving on the United States Court of Appeals for the D.C. Circuit, and current Associate Justice of the U.S. Supreme Court and a former White House Staff Secretary.

After his clerkship, he worked for Representative Jeb Hensarling as a legislative assistant. He then moved to the private sector, working as a senior litigation assistant for the law firm Gibson, Dunn & Crutcher. His practice was mainly related to federal regulatory policy.

In May 2014, he went back to Capitol Hill, becoming General Counsel in the office of Senator Rob Portman. In this role, he accompanied Senator Portman to meetings of the Subcommittee on Investigations for the Homeland Security and Governmental Affairs Committee.

Lyons worked for the Jeb Bush 2016 presidential campaign. In February 2016, he joined the law firm Boyden Gray & Associates.

From January 2017 to February 2018, Lyons worked at the White House as Deputy Assistant to the President and Deputy Staff Secretary.

After the sudden departure of Rob Porter in February 2018, Lyons was promoted to acting White House Staff Secretary. In June he was formally appointed to the role on a permanent basis. Lyons oversaw, together with the White House Chief of Staff, the flow of information to the President.

In May 2020, Lyons was slated to serve as the Director of the United States Domestic Policy Council, but Lyons' appointment was derailed after influential "America First" conservatives voiced opposition due to his previous position with Jeb Bush's 2016 presidential bid and his consideration was withdrawn. Instead, he was promoted to the position of Counselor to the President, alongside Hope Hicks and Kellyanne Conway.

Government offices
Preceded by Rob Porter	White House Staff Secretary; 2018–2020	Succeeded by Jessica Hertz
