= Warren S. Rustand =

Warren Rustand
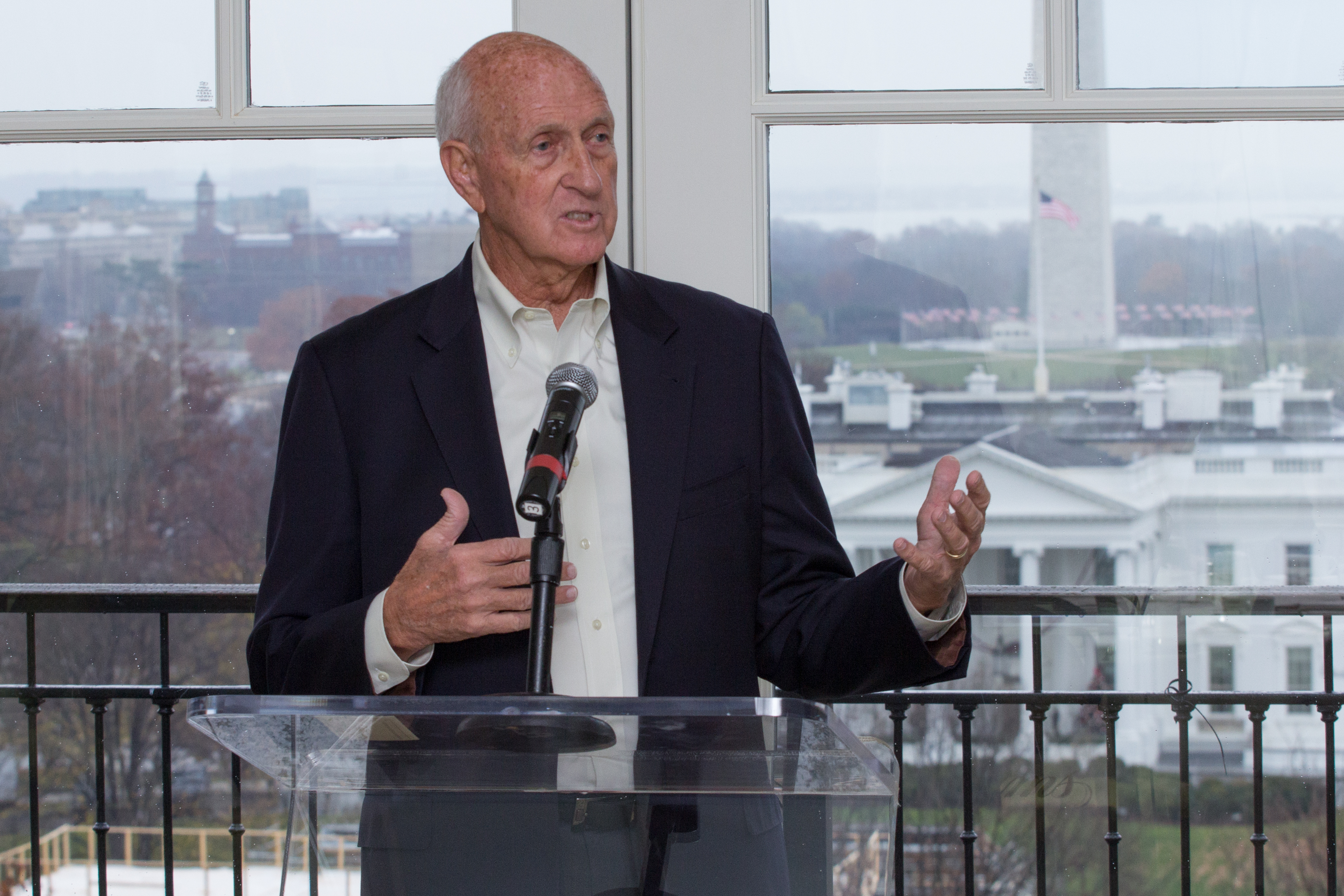
- Rustand in 2016

White House Appointments Secretary
- In office August 9, 1974 – January 20, 1977
- President: Gerald Ford
- Preceded by: Stephen Bull
- Succeeded by: Timothy Kraft

White House Cabinet Secretary
- In office August 9, 1974 – January 5, 1975
- President: Gerald Ford
- Preceded by: Alexander Butterfield (acting)
- Succeeded by: James E. Connor

Personal details
- Born: Warren Stanford Rustand; 1943 (age 82–83)
- Party: Republican
- Education: University of Arizona (BA)

Warren Stanford Rustand is past chairman of the World Presidents' Organization (WPO aka YPO Gold), Dean of Learning on the Entrepreneurs' Organization (EO) MIT Birthing of Giants Program, and Dean of the EO Leadership Academy.

He currently serves as the international chairman of L3, an American leadership group focused on one’s contribution during the second half of life.

Rustand served as White House Appointments Secretary during the administration of President Gerald Ford.

== Personal life ==
Rustand is married and has seven children and nineteen grandchildren.

Political offices
Preceded by Alexander Butterfield; Acting	White House Cabinet Secretary; 1974–1975	Succeeded by James E. Connor
Preceded by Stephen Bull	White House Appointments Secretary; 1974–1977	Succeeded by Timothy Kraft
