= Rob Porter =

American lawyer and political aide (born 1977)

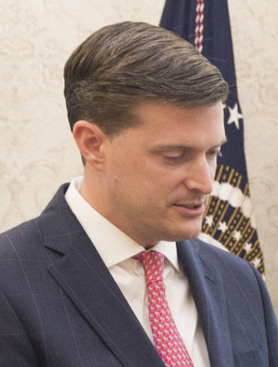
- Porter in 2017

White House Staff Secretary
- In office January 20, 2017 – February 7, 2018
- President: Donald Trump
- Deputy: Derek Lyons
- Preceded by: Joani Walsh
- Succeeded by: Derek Lyons

Personal details
- Born: Robert Roger Porter; October 25, 1977 (age 49) Boston, Massachusetts, U.S.
- Party: Republican
- Spouse(s): Colbie Holderness (m. 2003; div. 2008) Jennie Willoughby (m. 2009; div. 2013)
- Parent: Roger B. Porter (father)
- Education: Harvard University (BA, JD); New College, Oxford (MPhil)

Robert Roger Porter (born October 25, 1977) is an American lawyer and former political aide who served in the first Trump administration. He was White House Staff Secretary from 2017 until his resignation in 2018, when domestic abuse allegations from both of his former wives came to public attention. Since 2025, Porter has been Chief Global Affairs Officer for Coupang, an online retail and technology company headquartered in Seattle, Washington.

== Early life and education ==
Porter was born in Boston and grew up in Belmont, Massachusetts, and Washington, D.C. He is the son of Roger B. Porter, a former aide to Presidents George H. W. Bush, Ronald Reagan, and Gerald Ford, who is IBM Professor of Business and Government at Harvard University. Porter's mother Ann Porter (née Robinson), who died in May 2017, was Faculty Dean of Harvard's Dunster House dormitory. After graduating from high school, Porter interned in the United States Senate.

He attended Harvard University, where he studied government and was elected President of the Harvard Republican Club and Chair of Harvard Students for Bush. After his freshman year at Harvard, he began a two-year stint as a missionary for The Church of Jesus Christ of Latter-day Saints in London, England. During the summer of his junior year, Porter completed an internship at the White House and worked for the Domestic Policy Council. He graduated summa cum laude in 2002 with membership in Phi Beta Kappa and was awarded the Thomas T. Hoopes Prize for outstanding academic research.

Porter was subsequently a Rhodes Scholar, studying Political Theory at the University of Oxford, where his thesis research focused on the moral and political thought of C. S. Lewis, graduating in 2005. Porter then attended Harvard Law School, graduating in 2008 with his Juris Doctor. He served as Editor-in-Chief of the Harvard Journal of Law & Public Policy, a student-run publication focused on conservative and libertarian legal scholarship. Porter was also a Lincoln Fellow at the Claremont Institute, a conservative think tank dedicated to statesmanship and political philosophy.

== Political career ==
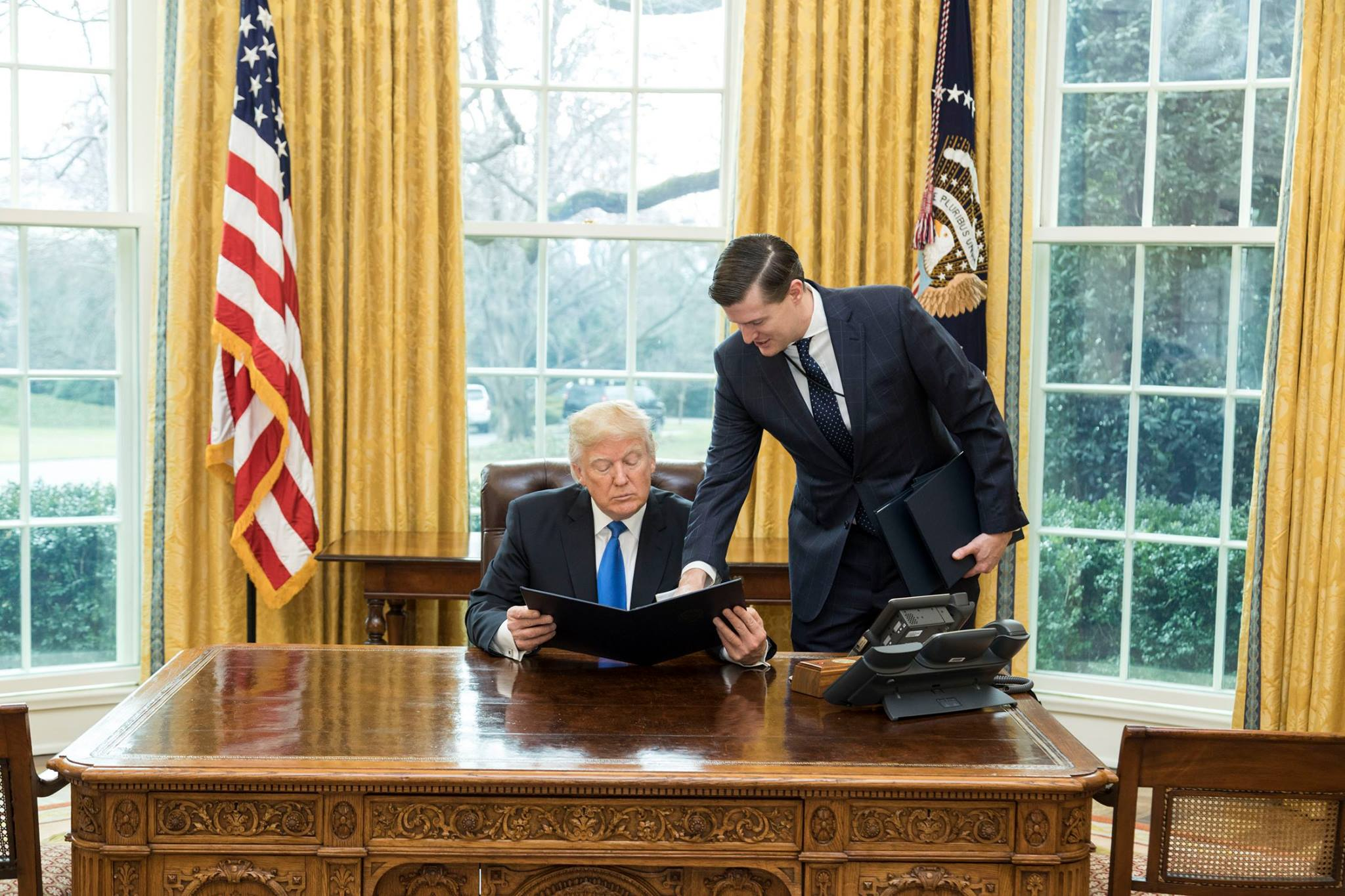
Porter with President Donald Trump in the Oval Office, January 2017

Following law school, Porter clerked for the United States Court of Appeals for the District of Columbia Circuit. After working briefly in private practice at a corporate law firm, Porter served as Chief Counsel to Senator Mike Lee on the Senate Judiciary Committee and later as General Counsel to Senator Rob Portman. In 2014, Porter became Chief of Staff to Senator Orrin Hatch.

Porter left his work with Congress in January 2017 to become White House Staff Secretary for President Donald Trump. In that role he drafted the President's executive orders, vetted official documents requiring a presidential signature, and briefed the president daily on a range of issues. He also served as Assistant to the President for Policy Coordination and "de facto deputy chief of staff for policy," overseeing the President's policy development and decision-making processes.

During the first year of the first Trump administration, Porter led policy formulation on international trade, convening weekly cabinet-level meetings and developing tariff recommendations for the President. He was also credited with a lead role in crafting Trump's first State of the Union address in January 2018.

Porter resigned from his position at the White House on February 7, 2018, following public allegations of spousal abuse, and was succeeded on an acting basis by Derek Lyons. After his departure, Porter continued to advise Trump on policy issues. Trump told aides he wanted Porter to return to the White House, commenting that excessive media criticism due to his proximity to the President had left Porter unable to defend himself publicly.

In September 2018, Porter and two other former Trump aides criticized Bob Woodward's book Fear: Trump in the White House, with Porter defending the president and saying the book was "selective and often misleading" in describing the administration. The Wall Street Journal published a pro-Trump opinion article by Porter in March 2019, arguing that despite his protectionist orientation Trump could "advance the cause of free trade more consequentially" than previous presidents. The House Judiciary Committee subpoenaed Porter in August 2019 to testify regarding Trump's actions in response to the Russia investigation, and the White House directed Porter not to testify in September 2019.

== Coupang ==
In 2023, Coupang appointed Porter as an advisor for external affairs, with a portfolio including global investments, cross-border trade, and U.S. government relations. In 2025, Porter became the company's Chief Global Affairs Officer, leading teams across North America, Asia, and Europe.

== Personal life ==
In 2003, Porter married Colbie Holderness in Oxford, England, where he was a graduate student; they filed jointly for divorce in Massachusetts in 2008 citing irreconcilable differences. In 2009, he married Jennifer Willoughby in Cambridge, Massachusetts; Porter filed for divorce from Willoughby in Virginia in 2013. In February 2018, Willoughby and Holderness made allegations in an online British tabloid, DailyMail.com, that Porter had been abusive during their marriages. Both Willoughby and Holderness authored opinion pieces linking their allegations to political criticisms of the Trump administration. The story produced significant media coverage given scrutiny of the Trump White House. While various outlets published a photo of Holderness with a black eye that she said she took to document alleged abuse; she later admitted that this claim was false and that in fact Porter had taken the photo.

Porter denied his ex-wives' claims but resigned from his position at the White House on February 7, 2018, stating, "These outrageous allegations are simply false.... I have been transparent and truthful about these vile claims, but I will not further engage publicly with a coordinated smear campaign." Asked by reporters two days after Porter's resignation, President Donald Trump commented, "He said very strongly yesterday that he's innocent so you have to talk to him about that, but we absolutely wish him well, he did a very good job when he was at the White House." Willoughby stated "I don't want to be married to him … But I definitely want him in the White House and the position he is in. I think his integrity and ability to do his job is impeccable."

The Washington Post reported that White House counsel Don McGahn had known since January 2017 about allegations Porter's ex-wives made to the FBI, and that Chief of Staff John F. Kelly had known about the allegations since October 2017. Post reporter Aaron Blake wrote that this development made the allegations a "full-blown scandal". Kelly confirmed that Porter's background check had been completed by the FBI, as had been suggested by bureau director, Christopher Wray, but described the tabloid media claims against Porter as "new allegations" not originally included in the FBI background report.

Porter had been dating White House Director of Communications Hope Hicks at the time of his resignation in 2018.

Political offices
Preceded by Joani Walsh	White House Staff Secretary; 2017–2018	Succeeded by Derek Lyons; Acting
