= 2024 Democratic Party vice presidential candidate selection =

2024 Democratic vice presidential nomination
- August 6, 2024
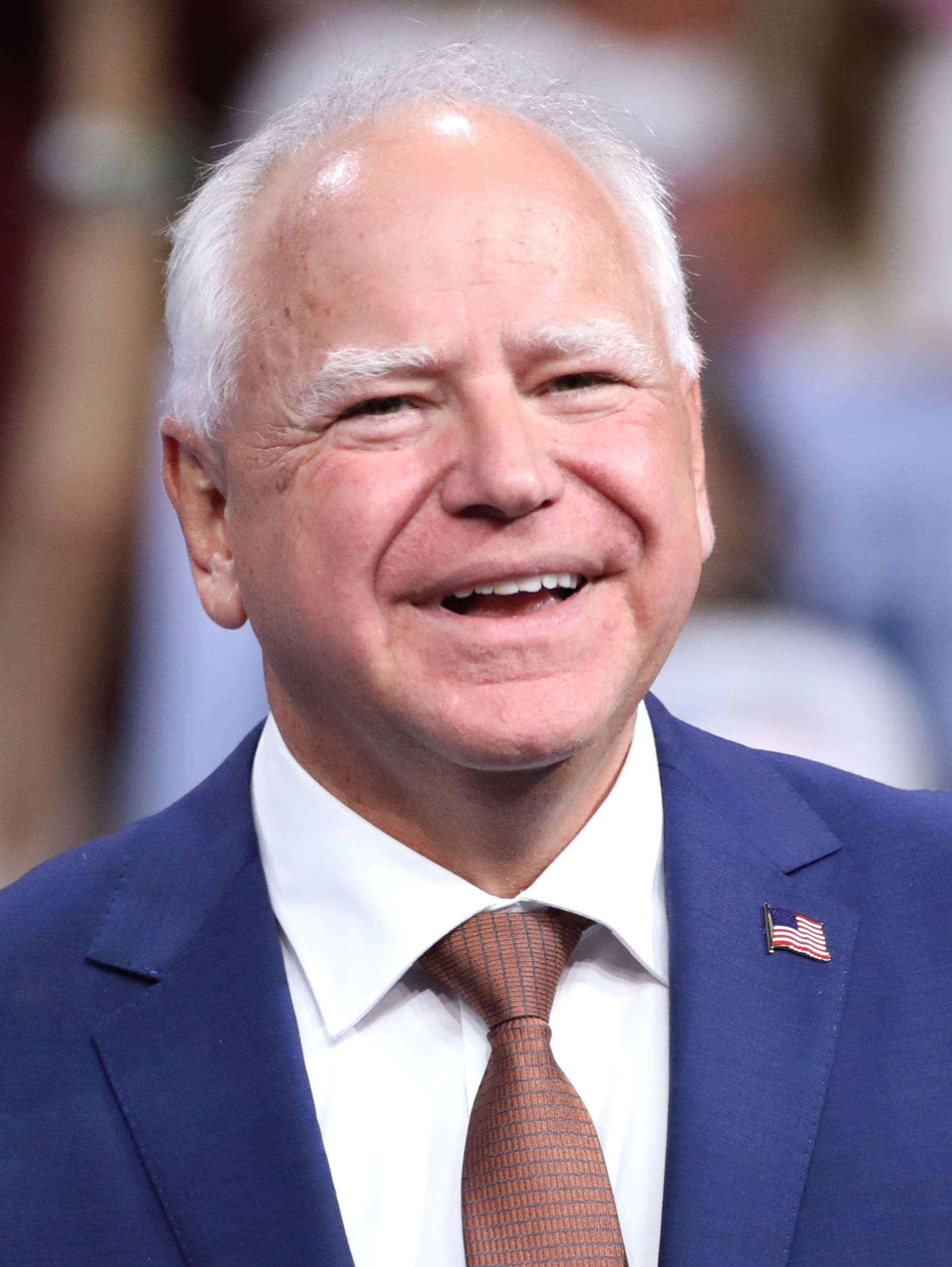
Nominee	Tim Walz
Home state	Minnesota
Previous Vice Presidential nominee
Kamala Harris
Vice Presidential nominee
Tim Walz

Incumbent Vice President Kamala Harris, the Democratic nominee for President of the United States in 2024, considered several prominent individuals as potential running mates. On August 6, 2024, she chose Governor Tim Walz of Minnesota as her candidate for vice president.

After formally accepting their nomination during the 2024 Democratic National Convention, Harris and Walz went on to lose the general election to the Republican ticket of former President Donald Trump and U.S. Senator JD Vance.

== Background ==
President Joe Biden initially sought re-election in 2024 with Harris was expected to remain as his running mate. Biden competed in the Democratic presidential primaries facing candidates such as Minnesota US representative Dean Phillips, and businessman Jason Palmer. Biden became the presumptive nominee on March 12. However, amidst concerns about his age and ability to serve as president, Biden ultimately suspended his re-election campaign on July 21, 2024 and immediately endorsed Harris to replace him as the party's presidential nominee.

Also on July 21, Harris quickly announced her own presidential campaign later that day, and the "Biden for President" campaign committee filed paperwork with the Federal Election Commission to change the name of the committee to "Harris for President". On July 22, Harris secured enough non-binding endorsements of the uncommitted delegates that had previously been pledged to Biden to make her the new presumptive Democratic presidential nominee.

== Selection process ==
Covington & Burling, former U.S. attorney general Eric Holder's law firm, and Dana Remus, former White House counsel to President Biden, conducted the Harris campaign's running mate vetting process.

Former Under Secretary of State for Public Diplomacy and Public Affairs Elizabeth M. Allen led the campaign's vetting team alongside former Congressman Cedric Richmond, Senator Catherine Cortez Masto, and former secretary of labor Marty Walsh.

ABC News reported on July 23 that Arizona Senator Mark Kelly and Governor Josh Shapiro were the leading candidates to be selected as Harris's running mate. The Financial Times reported the same day that donors preferred North Carolina Governor Roy Cooper or Shapiro, while "Hollywood Democrats" backed Kelly. Talking Points Memo reported the following day that Cooper was an additional top choice. Minnesota Governor Tim Walz was also a serious candidate, as were Kentucky Governor Andy Beshear and Transportation Secretary Pete Buttigieg.

The New York Times reported on July 29 that Cooper had voluntarily withdrawn his name from consideration. The Hill reported the next day that several progressive leaders and political groups urged Harris to pick Beshear or Walz instead of Shapiro to consolidate key voting groups and the Democratic base.

NBC News and The New York Times reported on August 1 that the vetting process was completed and Harris's final shortlist included Andy Beshear, Pete Buttigieg, Mark Kelly, J. B. Pritzker, Josh Shapiro, and Tim Walz. She interviewed Shapiro, Kelly, and Walz in person at the Number One Observatory Circle, and it was reported that Harris would choose between Walz and Shapiro. On August 6, she ultimately chose Walz, announcing the pick on August 6.

In Harris' book 107 Days, she wrote that Pete Buttigieg was her first choice to be her running mate, but felt it was too risky to have a black woman and a gay man running on the same ticket. Harris also wrote she asked for advice from her godson, Alexander Hudlin, who favored Walz.

Shapiro wrote in his 2026 book Where We Keep the Light that Dana Remus of the Harris vetting team had asked if he had been an "agent of the Israeli government" or communicated with an undercover Israeli agent. He felt the questions were offensive and was concerned about who was around the then-vice president.

=== Shortlist ===
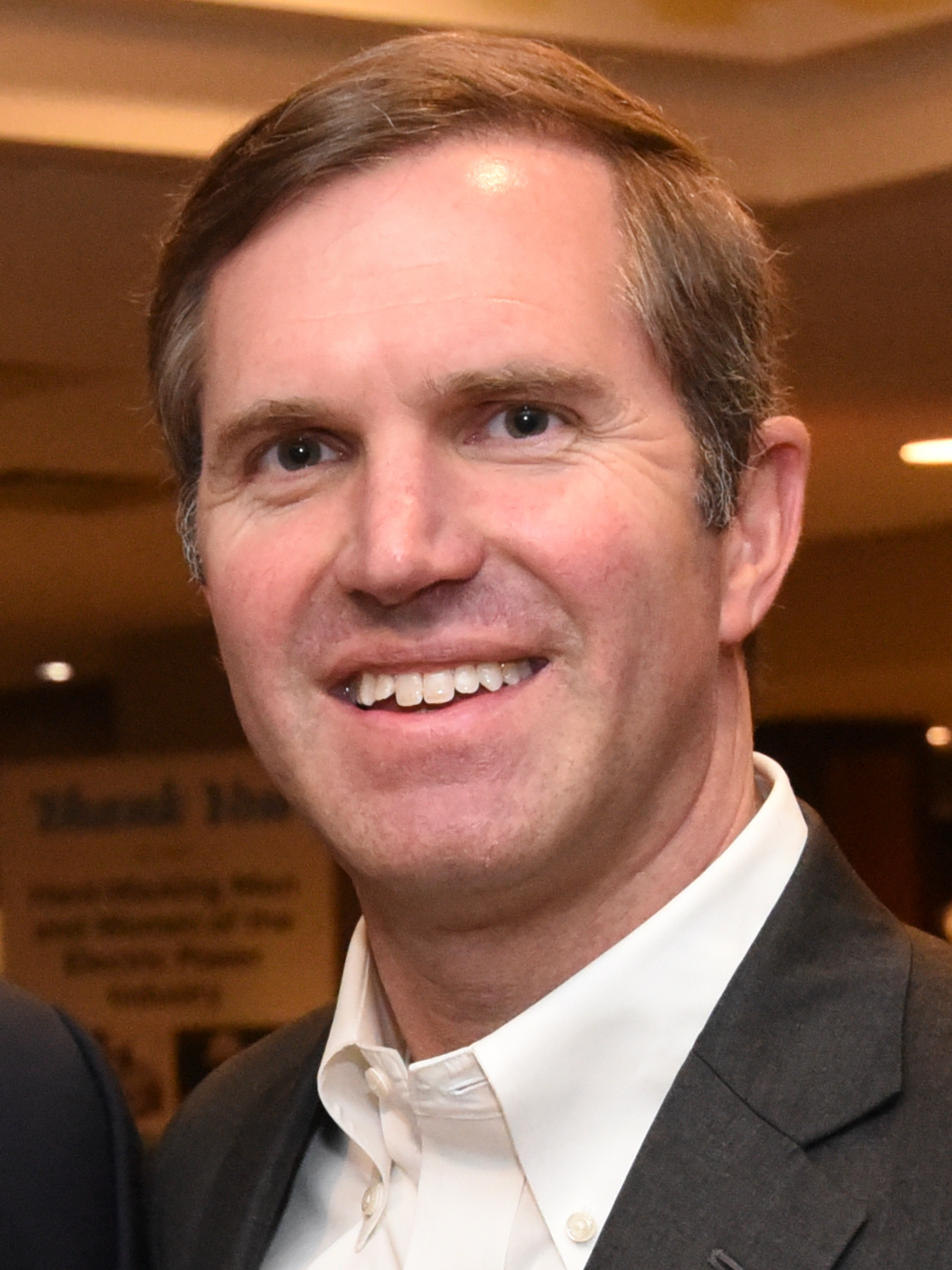
Governor
Andy Beshear
of Kentucky
(2019–present)

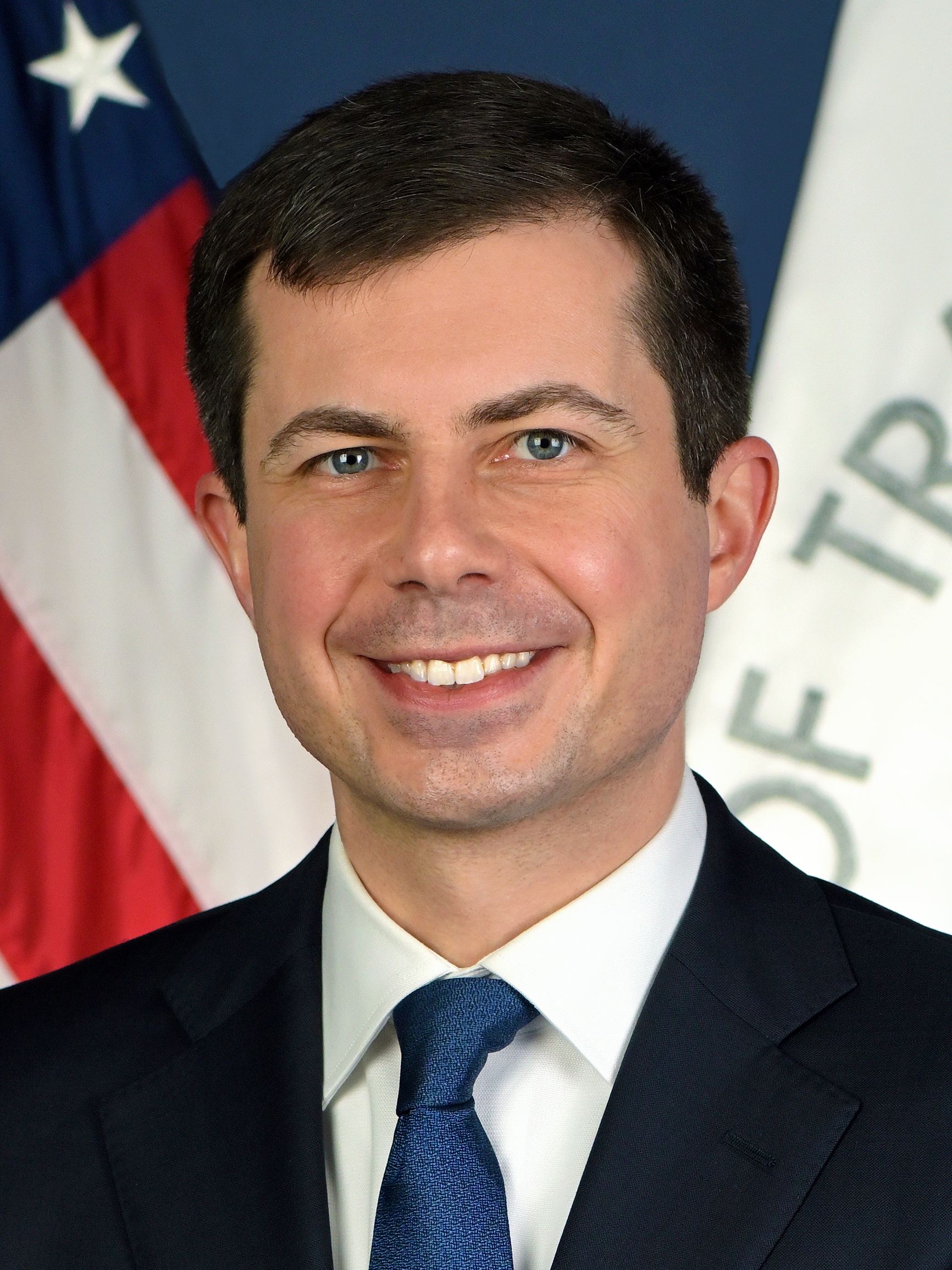
Secretary of Transportation
Pete Buttigieg
from Michigan (Note: Buttigieg served as the mayor of South Bend, Indiana, from 2012 to 2020 and was a resident of Indiana during his 2020 presidential campaign. He changed his residency to Michigan in 2022 and voted there in that year's midterm elections.)
(2021–2025)

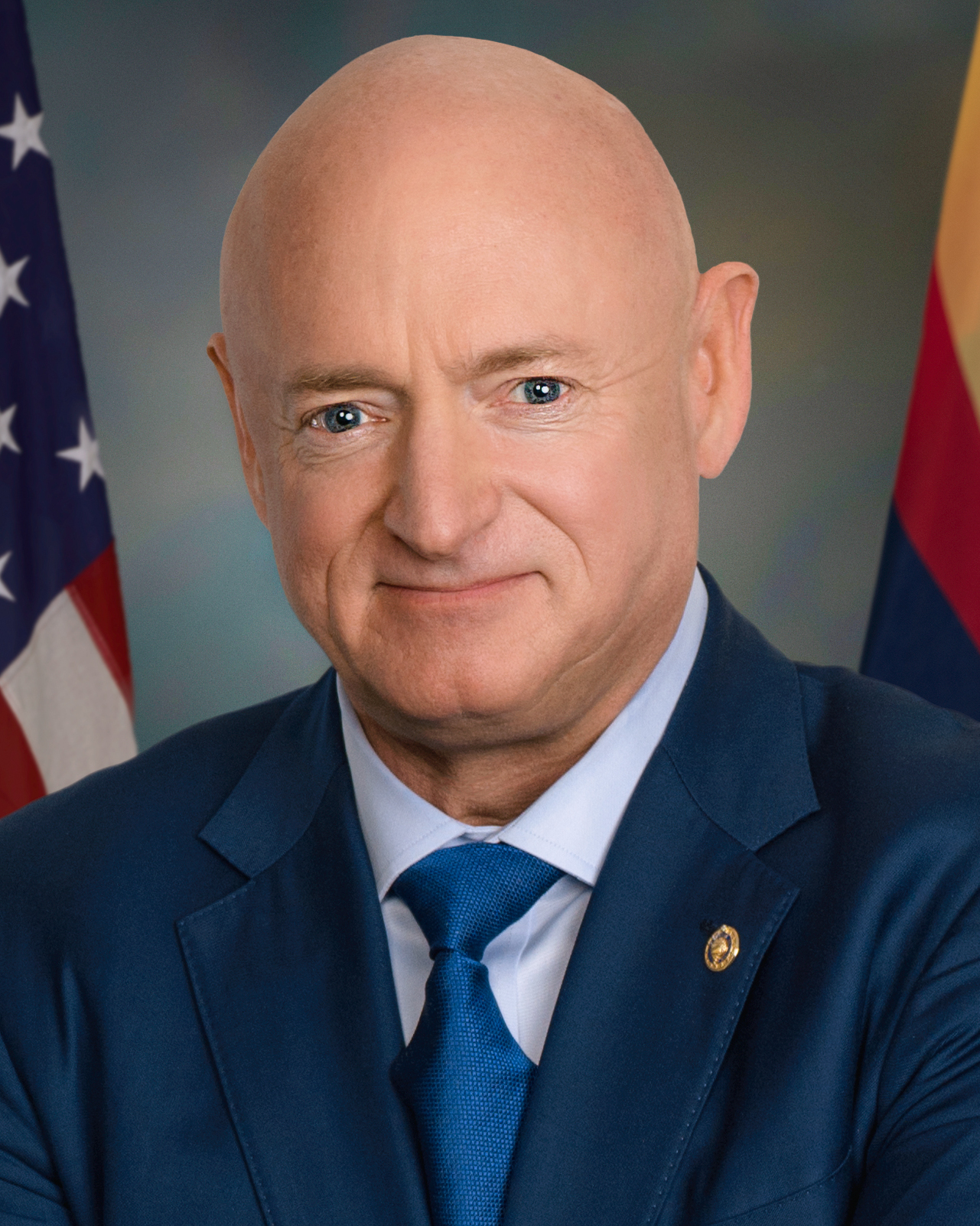
Senator
Mark Kelly
from Arizona
(2020–present)

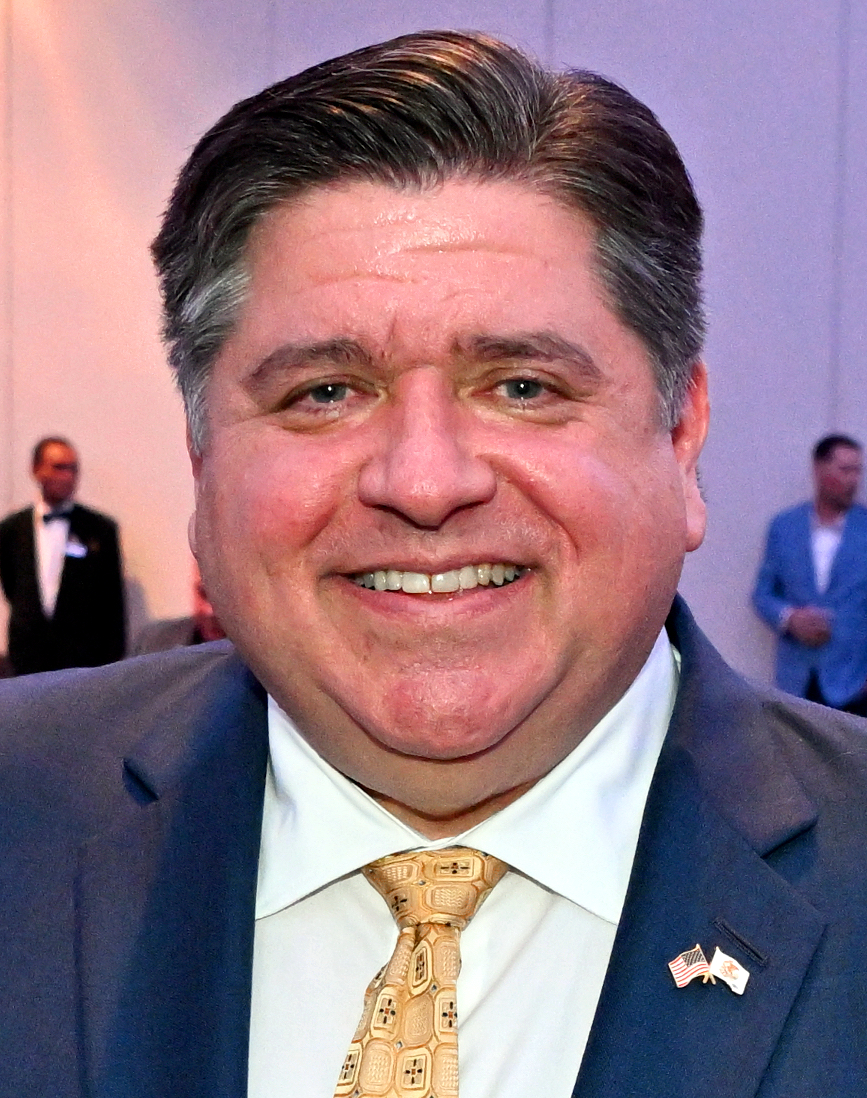
Governor
J. B. Pritzker
of Illinois
(2019–present)

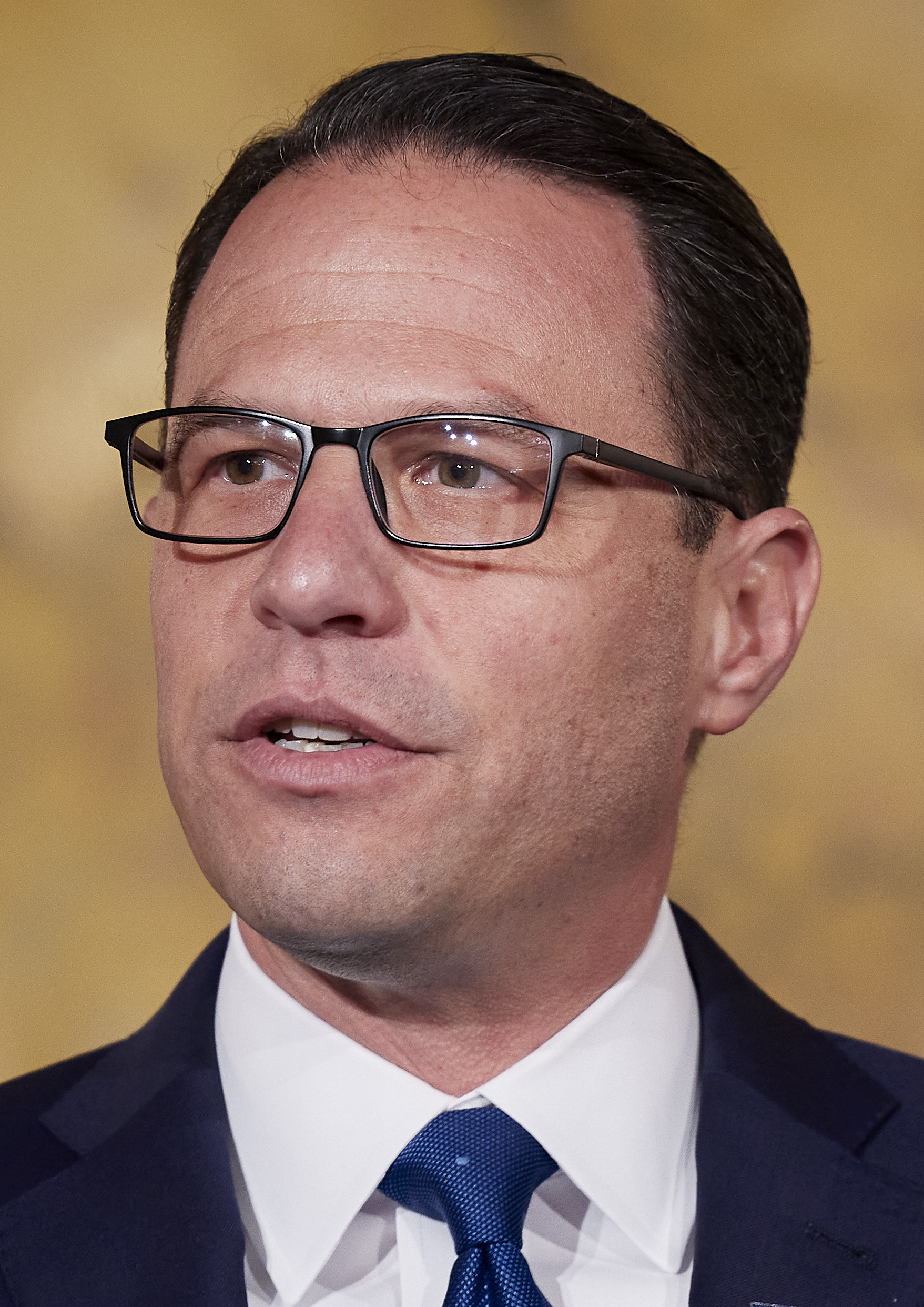
Governor
Josh Shapiro
of Pennsylvania
(2023–present)

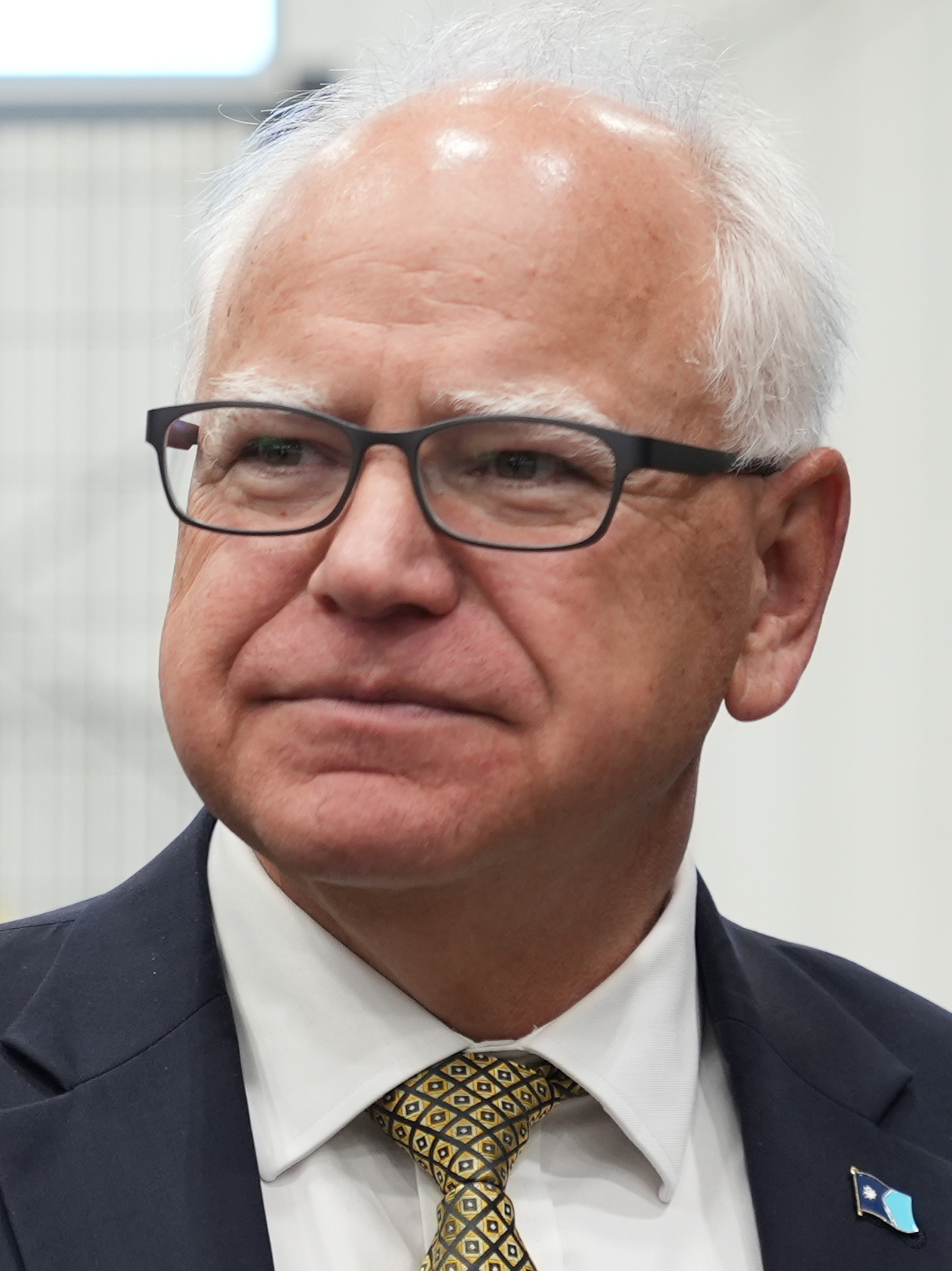
Governor
Tim Walz
of Minnesota
(2019–present)

=== Formally vetted ===
In addition to the candidates on the shortlist, the following candidates either reportedly received vetting materials from the Harris campaign on July 23, 2024 or were reportedly being considered.

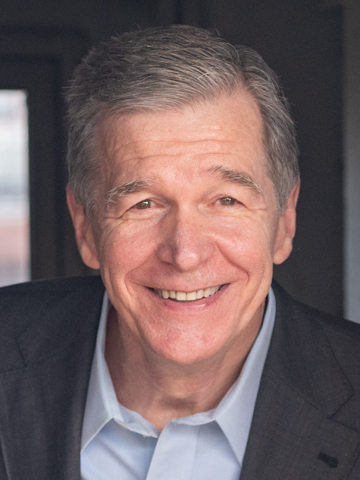
Governor
Roy Cooper
of North Carolina
(2017–2025) (withdrew)

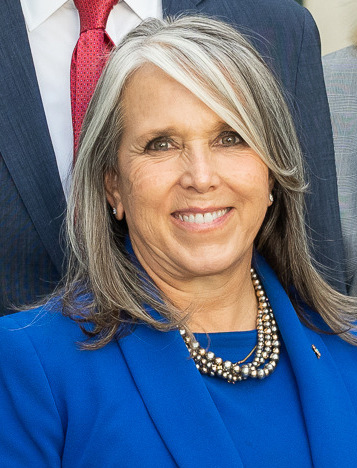
Governor
Michelle Lujan Grisham
of New Mexico
(2019–present)

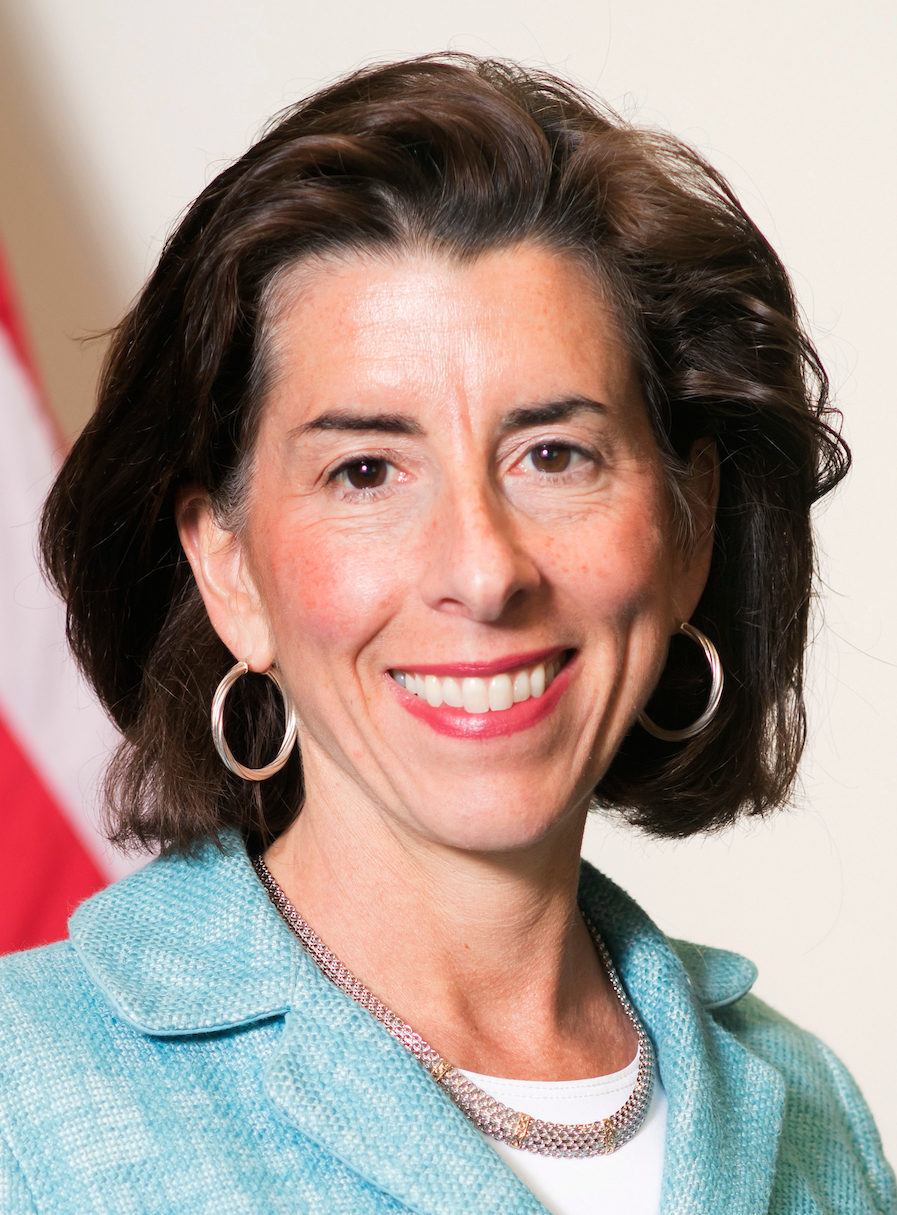
Secretary of Commerce
Gina Raimondo
from Rhode Island
(2021–2025)

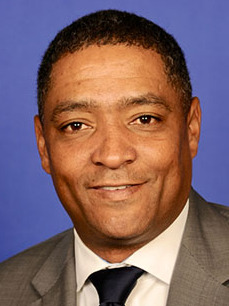
Former Representative
Cedric Richmond
from Louisiana
(2011–2021)

=== Declined to be considered ===
In addition to Roy Cooper, the following individuals were noted by media as potential running mates, but either publicly or privately withdrew their names from consideration. Despite being listed as a serious contender, Michigan Governor Gretchen Whitmer stated on July 29 that she never received any vetting materials and declined to be considered, preferring to serve the remainder of her term.

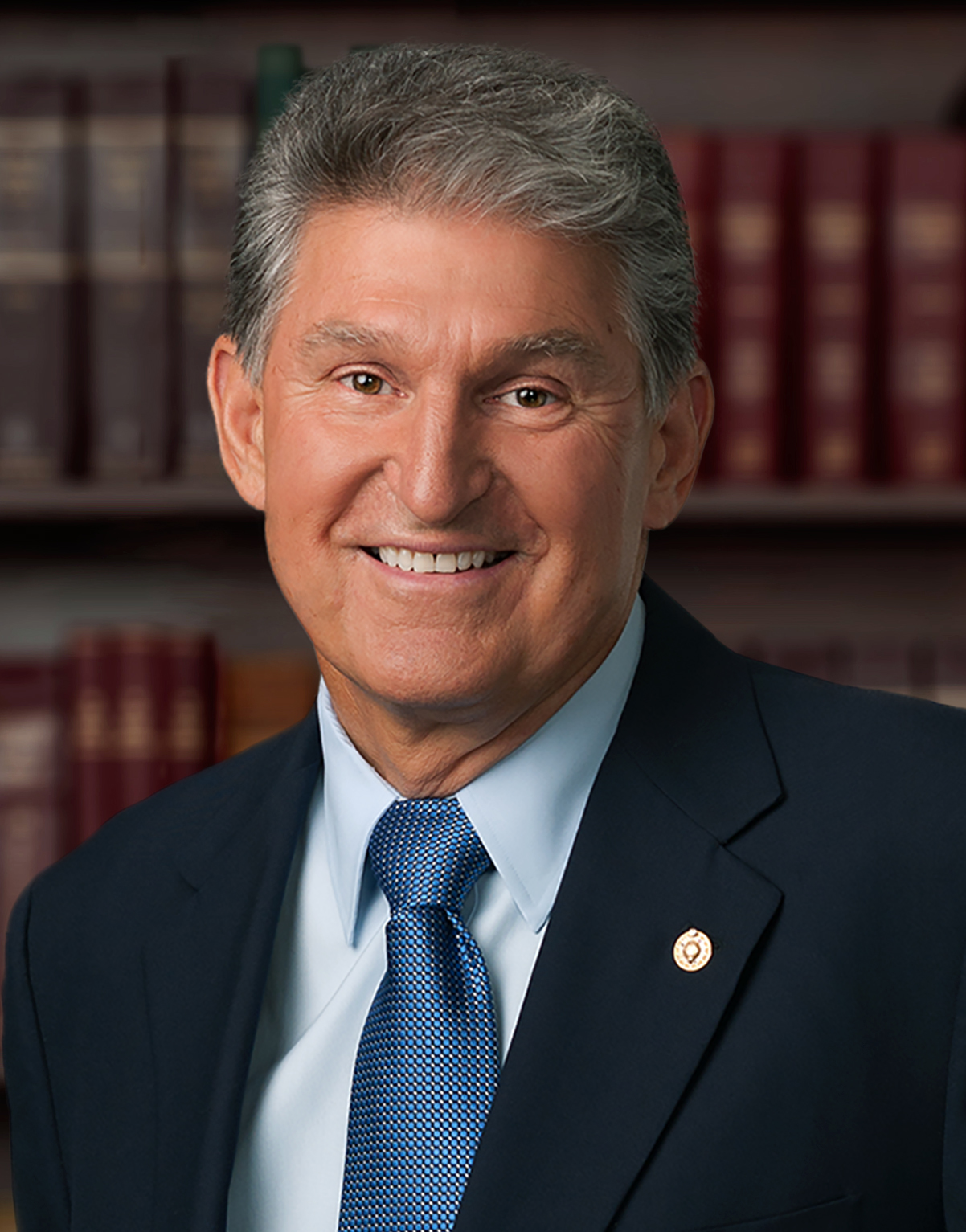
Senator
Joe Manchin
from West Virginia
(2010–2025)
(independent)

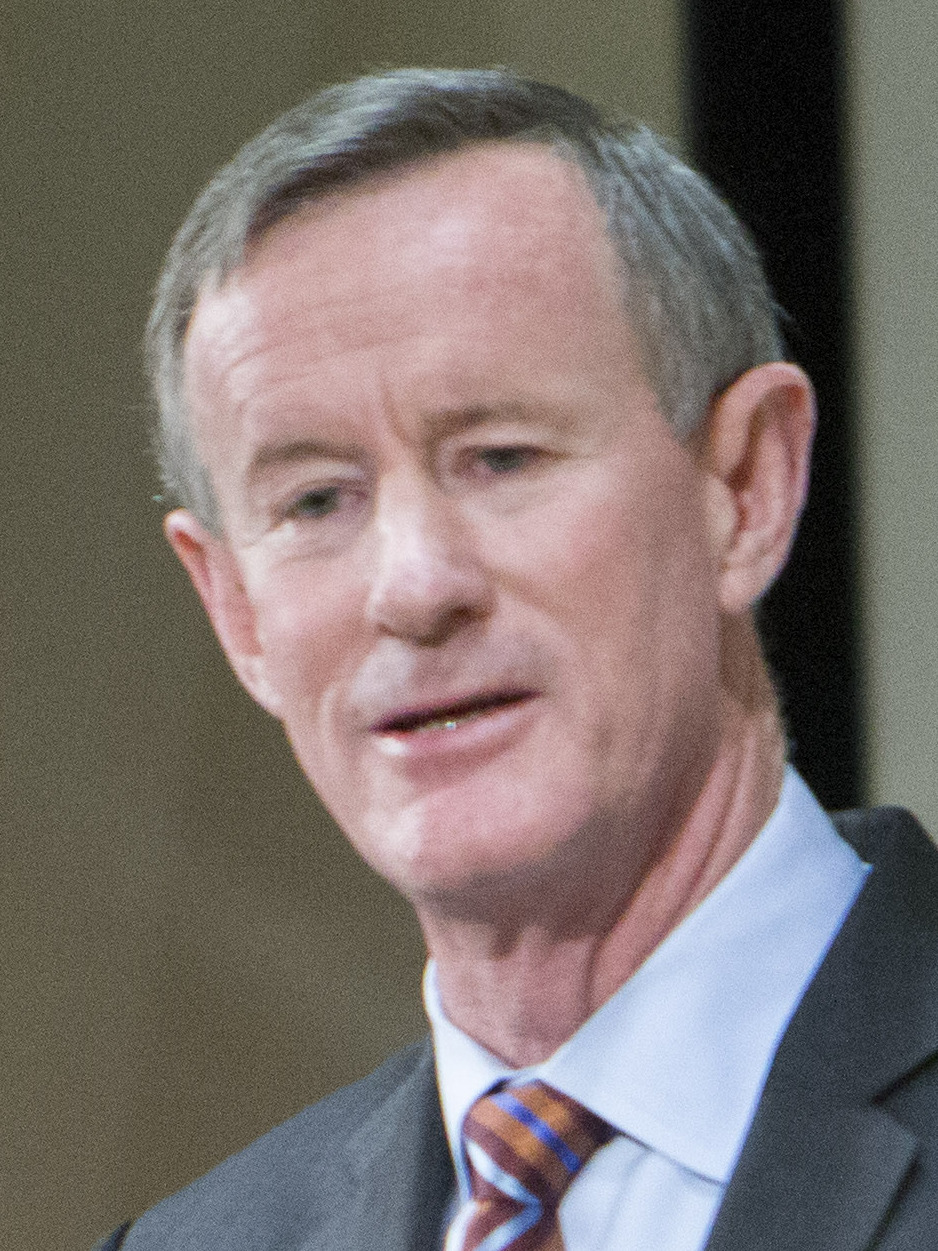
Commander of USSOCOM
William H. McRaven
from Texas
(2011–2014)

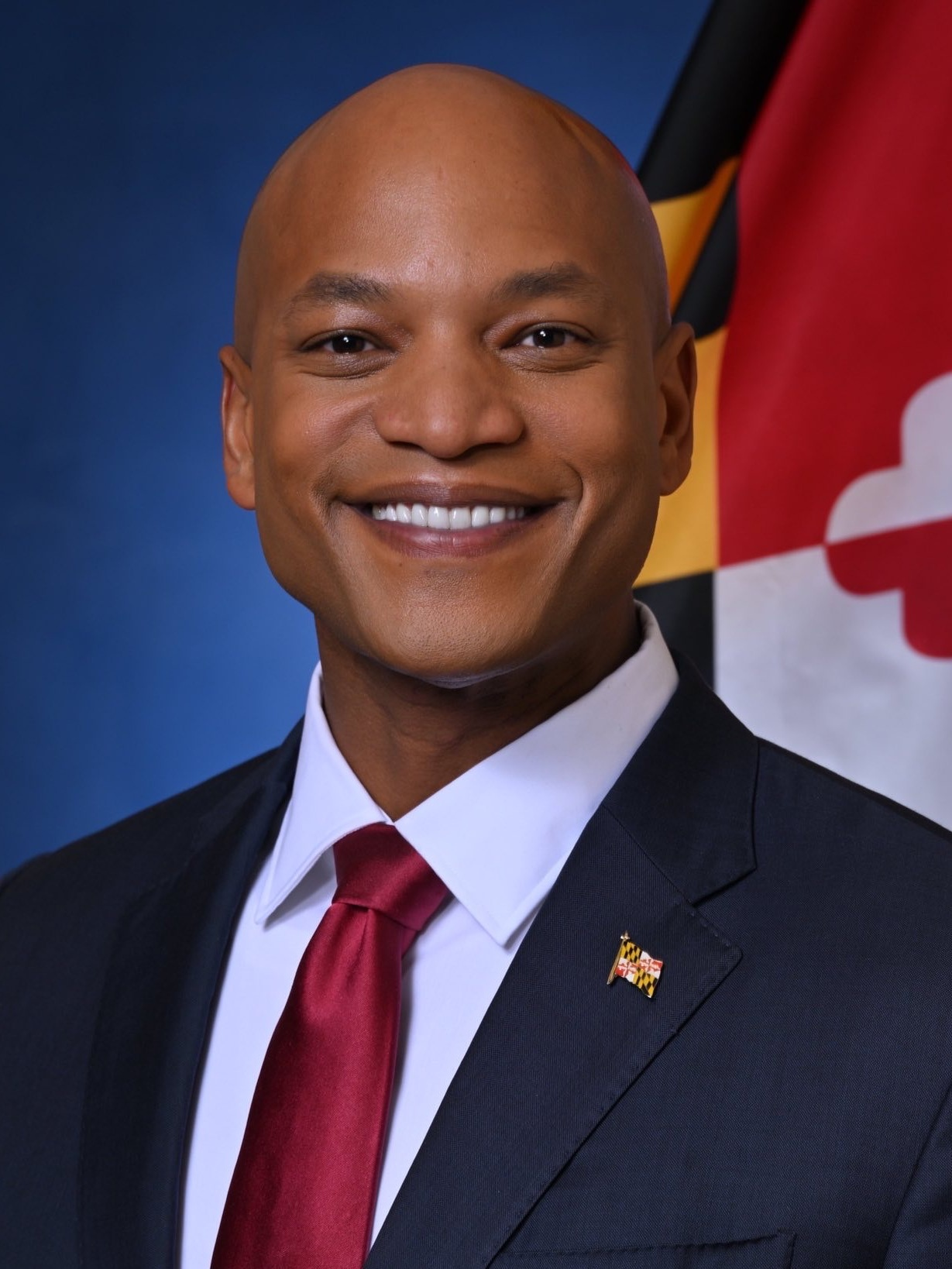
Governor
Wes Moore
of Maryland
(2023–present)

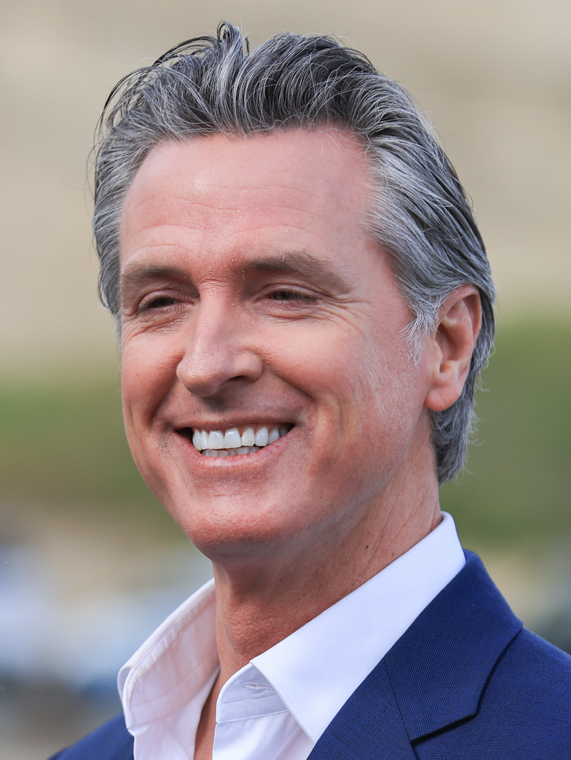
Governor
Gavin Newsom
of California
(2019–present)

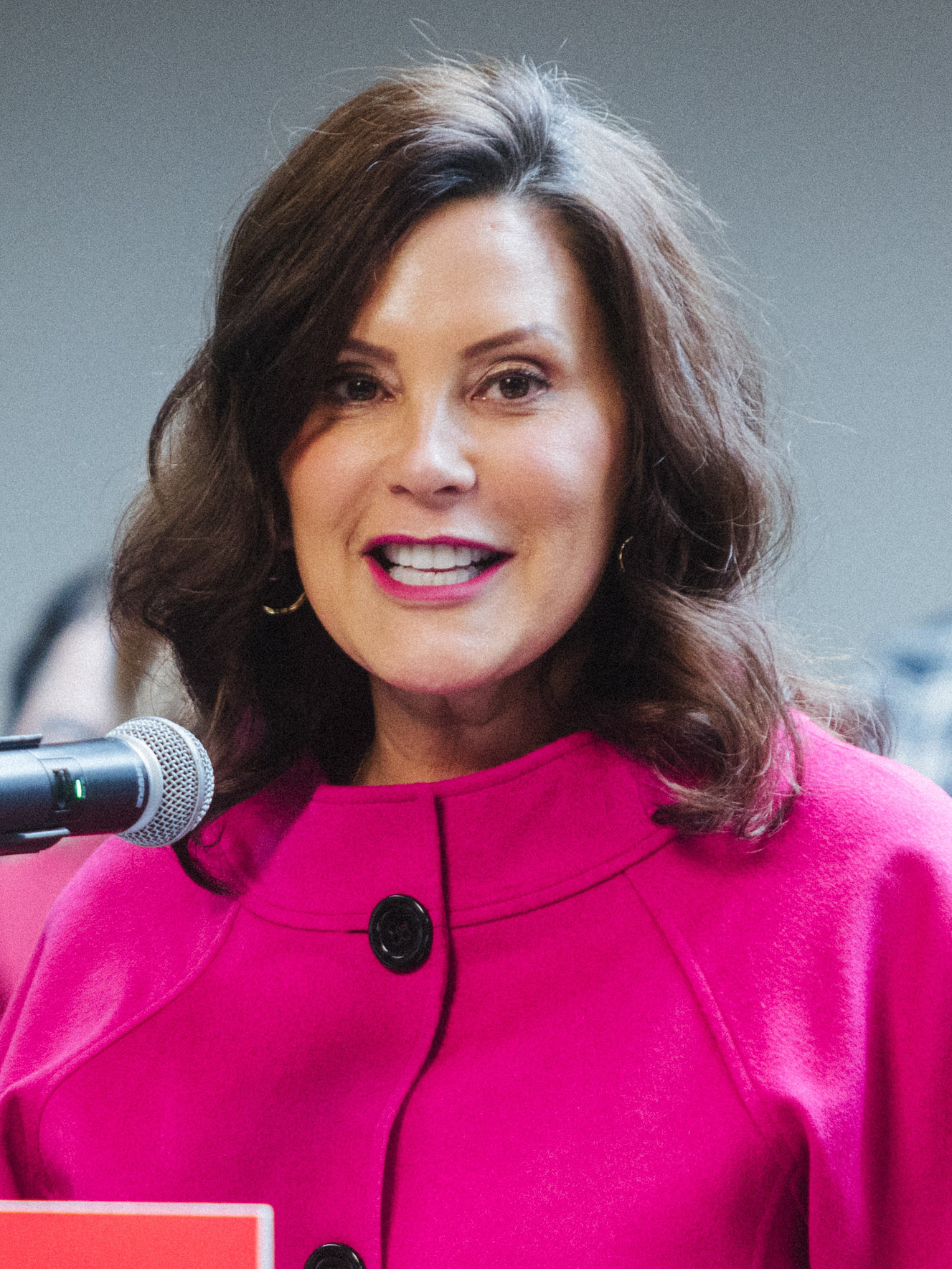
Governor
Gretchen Whitmer
of Michigan
(2019–present)

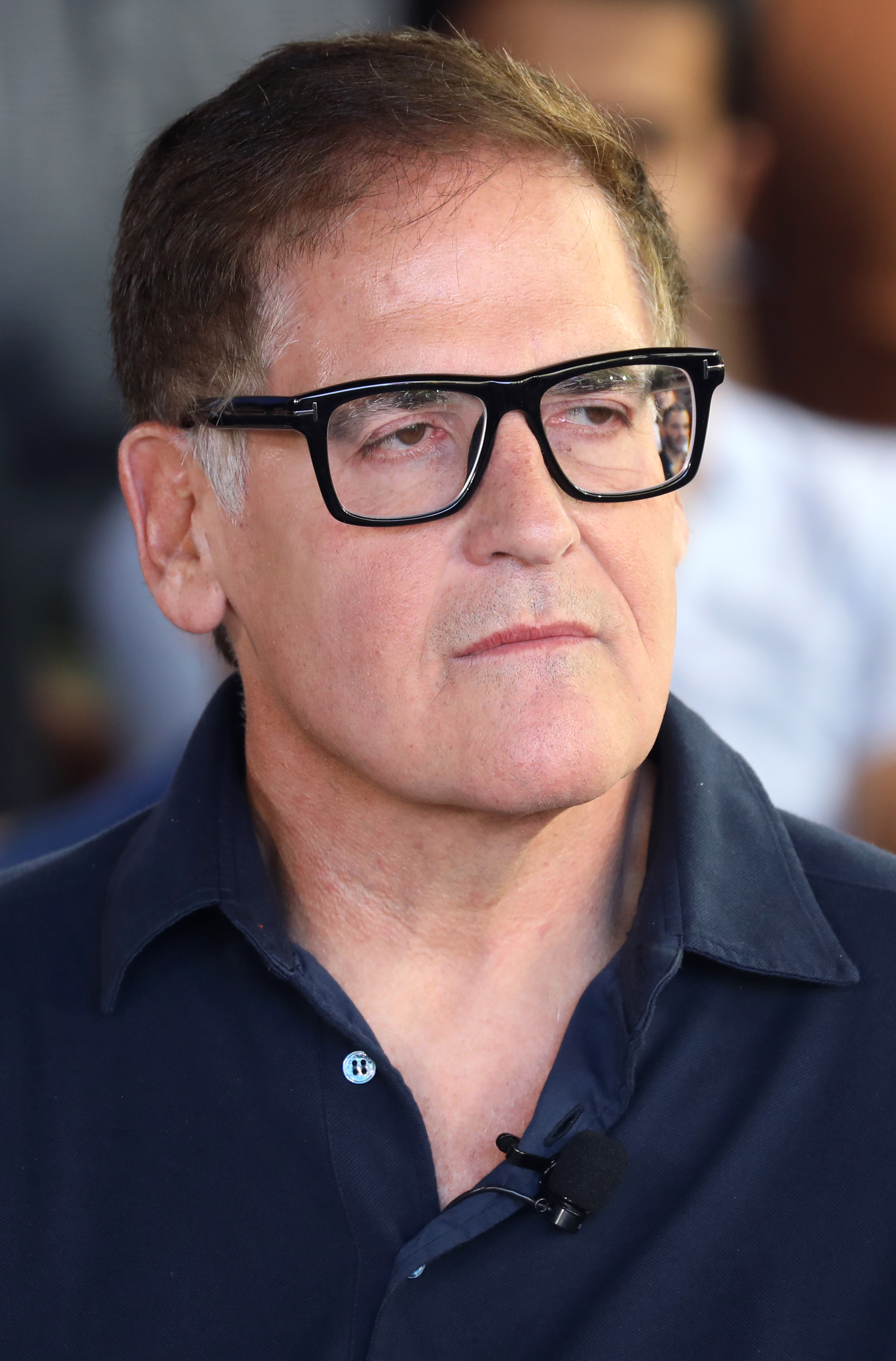
Businessman
Mark Cuban
from Texas
(independent)

== Endorsements ==
Andy Beshear

Notable individuals

- Shawn Fain, president of the United Auto Workers (co-endorsement with Tim Walz)
Mark Kelly

Political parties

- Arizona Democratic Party
Josh Shapiro

Governors

- Chris Christie, 55th governor of New Jersey (2010-2018) (Republican)

Local officials

- Bob Brady, Chair of the Democratic Party of Philadelphia (1986–present), U.S. Representative for 1st (1998–2019)
- Cherelle Parker, Mayor of Philadelphia (2024–present)

Political parties

- Democratic Party of Philadelphia
Tim Walz

U.S. Senators

- Bernie Sanders, U.S. Senator from Vermont (2007–present), 2016 and 2020 candidate for the Democratic nomination for president (independent)

U.S. Representatives

- Nancy Pelosi, U.S. Representative from CA-11 (1987–present), Speaker of the House of Representatives (2007–2011; 2019–2023), House Minority Leader (2003–2007; 2011–2019)
- Dean Phillips, U.S. Representative from MN-03 (2019–2025), 2024 candidate for the Democratic nomination for president

Individuals

- Shawn Fain, president of the United Auto Workers (co-endorsement with Andy Beshear)

== Opinion polling ==
Vice presidential polling
Poll source	Date(s) administered	Sample size (Note: Key: A – all adults RV – registered voters LV – likely voters V – unclear)	Andy Beshear	Pete Buttigieg	Roy Cooper	Mark Kelly	Wes Moore	J. B. Pritzker	Josh Shapiro	Gretchen Whitmer	Others	Undecided
YouGov	July 29–31, 2024	1,127 (A)	5%	12%	1%	16%	–	2%	8%	5%	18% (Note: Includes Gavin Newsom on 6%, Tim Walz on 5%, Raphael Warnock on 2%)	34%
Leger	July 26–28, 2024	301 (A)	7%	11%	8%	10%	2%	4%	18%	–	–	41%
NPR/PBS News/Marist Poll	July 22–23, 2024	1,309 (LV)	6%	21%	8%	13%	6%	7%	17%	21%	–	–
SurveyUSA/FairVote	July 8–10, 2024	2,050 (LV)	3%	20%	3%	–	–	5%	14%	19%	12% (Note: Includes Amy Klobuchar on 5%, Jared Polis on 3%, and Jamie Raskin on 5%)	19%

== Announcement ==
Politico reported on July 30 that Harris planned to hold a rally with her running mate choice in Philadelphia on August 6, raising speculation that the pick was Pennsylvania Governor Josh Shapiro; however, a campaign aide for Harris cautioned against speculation regarding Philadelphia being chosen as the venue for the rally. Harris announced on social media on August 6 that she had selected Tim Walz as her running mate. She cited his deep commitment to his family as what impressed her the most.

== Analysis ==
The selection was described by The New York Times as a proxy war between progressive and moderate Democrats. Progressive activists accused Shapiro and Kelly of being too conservative, specifically on labor issues, public education, and the Gaza war, therefore backing Walz. Moderates defended Shapiro, accusing progressives of antisemitism in their attacks. Both sides seemingly accepted Beshear. An opinion piece in USA Today said that not picking Shapiro would signal support for a progressive platform, and one in The Guardian said picking Shapiro would signal moderation.

Following the selection, CNN reported that "people familiar with the interview process said that Walz was also someone Harris felt could attract the kinds of voters that Democrats have lost to Donald Trump— voters that Harris may not be able to connect with on her own". Other reports suggested that Walz's folksy, plain-spoken demeanor could help Harris win over blue-collar voters and rural voters in Midwestern swing states.

Walz was the first sitting governor selected as the Democratic vice-presidential nominee since Charles W. Bryan of Nebraska in 1924. If elected, Walz would have been the third vice president from Minnesota after Hubert Humphrey and Walter Mondale. Walz also became the first sitting governor to appear on a Democratic ticket since Bill Clinton in 1992.

== Later developments ==
Harris and Walz were certified as the Democratic Party's official nominees on August 6, 2024 by Democratic National Committee secretary Jason Rae.

After formally accepting their nomination on the third day of the 2024 Democratic National Convention, Harris and Walz went on to lose the general election to the Republican ticket of former President Donald Trump and U.S. Senator JD Vance. The Trump/Vance ticket won the Midwestern states of Michigan, Pennsylvania, and Wisconsin.

In her 2025 memoir 107 Days, Harris wrote that Secretary of Transportation Pete Buttigieg had been her "first choice" to be her running mate. She ultimately decided not to select him, however, because of her fear of how the American electorate would respond to a ticket of a Black woman and a gay man.

== See also ==
- Kamala Harris 2024 presidential campaign
- 2024 Democratic Party presidential candidates
- 2024 Democratic National Convention
- 2024 United States presidential election
- List of United States major party presidential tickets
- 2024 Republican Party vice presidential candidate selection
