= 2024 Veepstakes =

2024 Veepstakes may refer to:

- 2024 Democratic Party vice presidential candidate selection
- 2024 Republican Party vice presidential candidate selection
