= Will Scharf =

American attorney (born 1986)

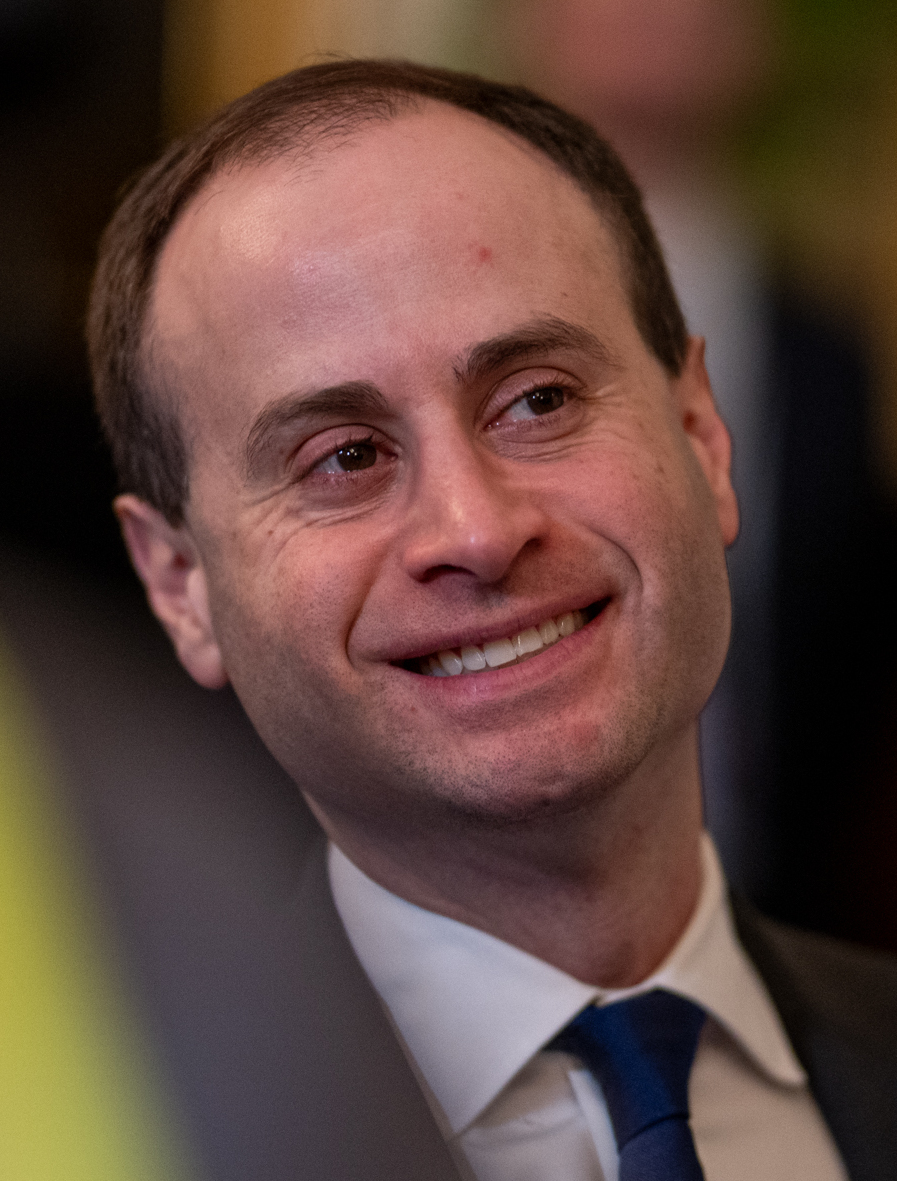
- Scharf in 2025

White House Counsel
- Incumbent
- Assumed office September 1, 2026
- President: Donald Trump
- Preceded by: David Warrington

White House Staff Secretary
- In office January 20, 2025 – September 1, 2026
- President: Donald Trump
- Preceded by: Stefanie Feldman
- Succeeded by: Ben Moss

Personal details
- Born: William Owen Scharf; March 29, 1986 (age 40) New York City, New York, U.S.
- Party: Republican
- Education: Princeton University (BA); Harvard University (JD)

William Owen Scharf (born March 29, 1986) is an American attorney and political operative who has served as the White House counsel since 2026. Scharf served as the White House staff secretary from 2025 to 2026.

Scharf graduated from Princeton University with a Bachelor of Arts in history in 2008 and from Harvard Law School with a Juris Doctor in 2011. After graduating from Harvard, he clerked for Judge Raymond Gruender of the Court of Appeals for the Eighth Circuit. Scharf later worked for Bryan Cave Leighton Paisner. In 2015, he was hired by Catherine Hanaway's campaign in the 2016 Missouri gubernatorial election to serve as Hanaway's policy director. After Hanaway lost the Republican primary to Eric Greitens, Scharf joined Greiten's campaign in a similar role. He served as Greitens's policy director until Greitens's resignation in June 2018.

Scharf was involved in several Supreme Court confirmations, including those for Brett Kavanaugh and Amy Coney Barrett. In June 2020, Scharf joined the U.S. Attorney's Office for the Eastern District of Missouri as a prosecutor in its violent crimes unit. In January 2023, Scharf announced that he would run in the 2024 Missouri attorney general election as a Republican, seeking to challenge the incumbent Andrew Bailey. In his campaign, Scharf sought to highlight his proximity to former President Donald Trump, for whom he had concurrently served as his personal lawyer, and claimed that Bailey had perpetrated corruption in the attorney general's office. Bailey defeated Scharf in the Republican primary in August 2024.

In November 2024, Trump named Scharf as his White House staff secretary. In July 2025, Trump appointed him to serve as the chair of the National Capital Planning Commission. In August 2026, Trump announced that Scharf would succeed David Warrington as the White House counsel.

== Early life and education (1986–2011) ==
William Owen Scharf was born on March 29, 1986, in New York City, New York. Scharf is the son of Fiona and Michael Scharf. Michael worked in private equity. They attended Princeton University, where they were the primary benefactors of Princeton's Chabad house. Scharf was raised in a Modern Orthodox household. He grew up in New York and North Florida. Scharf attended Phillips Academy in Andover, Massachusetts, graduating in 2004.

Scharf graduated magna cum laude from Princeton University in 2008 with a Bachelor of Arts in history. At Princeton, Scharf was involved in the Center for Jewish Life and Chabad. He was the president of the Chabad Student Board, the Charter Club, and the Interclub Council. Scharf ran for president of Princeton's student government in 2005, but lost in a runoff election by seventy votes. He was additionally a member of the Princeton Alcohol and Drug Alliance, was the press secretary for Princeton's chapter of College Republicans, and had a column in The Princeton Tory.

In 2008, Scharf was charged with selling alcohol to minors and causing a nuisance. The Princeton Municipal Court later dropped the charges; Scharf threatened to file a civil suit over the incident. After graduating from Princeton, Scharf earned a Juris Doctor from Harvard Law School in 2011. He served as the president of Harvard's Federalist Society chapter. Scharf told The Wall Street Journal that he chose to attend Harvard believing he would be more accepted as a conservative.

== Career ==
=== Clerkship and private practice (2011–2015) ===
After graduating from Harvard University in 2011, Scharf clerked for Judge Raymond Gruender of the Court of Appeals for the Eighth Circuit. He later worked for Bryan Cave Leighton Paisner. Scharf was additionally a teaching fellow at Harvard's Department of Government.

=== Political work (2015–2020) ===
In 2015, Scharf began volunteering for Catherine Hanaway's campaign in the 2016 Missouri gubernatorial election. He later joined the campaign as Hanaway's policy director. After Hanaway lost to Eric Greitens in the Republican primary, Greitens asked that Scharf join his campaign, where he served in a similar role. After Greitens won the election, he named Scharf as his policy director in December 2016. Scharf served as the vice chair of Greitens's tax-reform committee. As Greitens's policy director, he helped write anti-abortion legislation. In an interview with The Washington Post in March 2026, Scharf stated that he had worked with the Missouri General Assembly to cut the state's historic-preservation tax-credit program, that he had led its real-estate tax-credit programs, and that he had helped designate the state's opportunity zones.

In 2018, allegations emerged that Greitens had an affair and had committed campaign finance violations. In May 2018, the Missouri House of Representatives's Special Investigative Committee on Oversight requested that Scharf testify about a memorandum Scharf had written claiming that Greitens had obscured some of his donors. The following month, Greitens resigned amid the possibility of impeachment. Scharf left his administration in June. As a consultant for the Judicial Crisis Network, he worked on the Supreme Court confirmation of Brett Kavanaugh. Scharf additionally worked for CRC Advisors. In January 2020, the St. Louis Post-Dispatch reported that Scharf was a member of a Facebook group advocating for Greitens's return to political office.

=== Assistant U.S. attorney and private practice (2020–2023) ===
Scharf began working as an assistant U.S. attorney in the U.S. Attorney's Office for the Eastern District of Missouri in June 2020. A review of Scharf's work by The Guardian in July 2024 found that Scharf largely prosecuted felony firearm possessions and violations of supervised release. According to the Riverfront Times, Scharf had been listed in a monthly office birthday list for the U.S. Attorney's Office in March 2020, although the position that Scharf would eventually seek had not yet been vacated. Scharf was detailed as the nominations counsel in the Department of Justice's Office of Legal Policy to work on Amy Coney Barrett's Supreme Court confirmation in September. At the U.S. Attorney's Office for the Eastern District of Missouri, Scharf worked in the violent crimes unit. Scharf resigned in November 2022. By December 2023, he had joined D. John Sauer's James Otis Law Group.

=== Missouri attorney general campaign (2023–2024) ===
In November 2022, the Missouri Independent reported that Scharf was among several names being considered to succeed Eric Schmitt as the attorney general of Missouri if Schmitt were to win that year's Senate election. According to Spectrum News, Governor Mike Parson did not interview Scharf and instead named Andrew Bailey. Scharf resigned as an assistant U.S. attorney that month, he told the St. Louis Post-Dispatch that he was considering a campaign in the 2024 Missouri Attorney General election. On November 30, Scharf announced that he had established an exploratory committee for a campaign in 2024. He worked with the political consulting firm Axiom Strategies. In January 2023, the St. Louis Post-Dispatch reported that Scharf had donated US$505,000 to his campaign account and had garnered US$294,000 from over two hundred donors, including Leonard Leo, the co-chairman of the Federalist Society; West Virginia attorney general Patrick Morrisey; and Peter Bisbee, the executive director of the Republican Attorneys General Association.

On February 1, 2023, Scharf announced that he was running in the 2024 Missouri Attorney General election as a Republican. In August, Donald Trump called Scharf and requested that he join his appellate legal team. Scharf formally joined Trump's legal defense in October. He was involved in Trump's election obstruction case and his subsequent appeal to the Supreme Court. In differentiating himself from Bailey, Scharf cited his connection to Trump and vowed to prosecute machines resembling slot machines outside of casinos. He claimed that Bailey had accepted donations from lobbyists and companies, deeming him responsible for corruption at the attorney general's office. Bailey's campaign accused Scharf of having wealthy donors and noted his affluent background. In March 2024, Scharf received US$500,000 from Club for Growth's federal political action committee and US$1 million from the Concord Fund. The following month, he received three checks totaling US$3 million. Bailey defeated Scharf in the Republican primary on August 6.

== White House Staff Secretary (2025–2026) ==
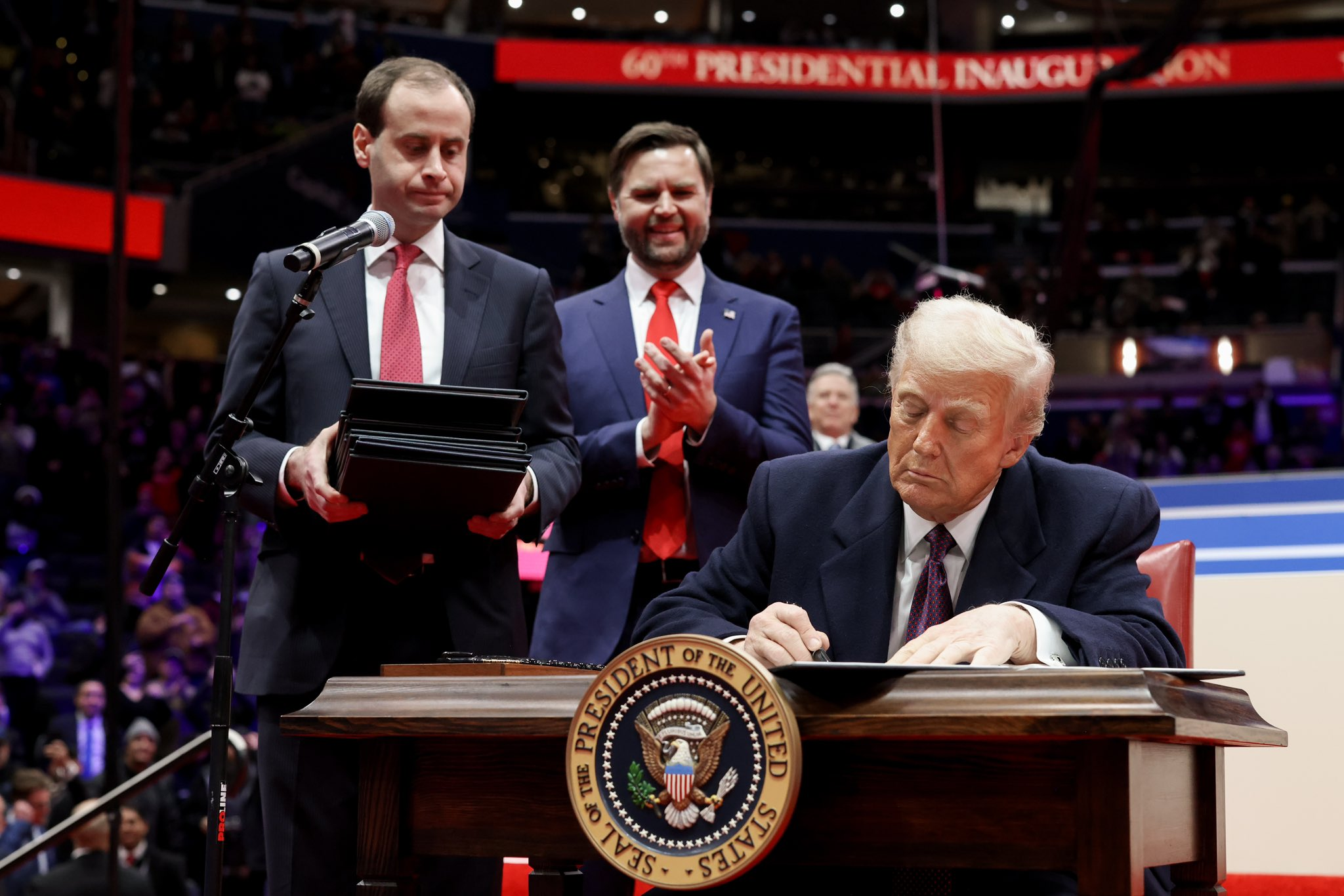
Scharf (left) watching Trump (right) sign an executive order following his inauguration.

On November 16, 2024, President-elect Donald Trump announced that he would name Scharf as his White House staff secretary. Scharf's responsibilities included managing executive orders for Trump to sign; The Washington Post described Scharf's role in publicly presenting the orders to Trump as "not only of a lawyer, but something akin to a game show host sidekick". According to Regime Change (2026), Scharf wrote confidential memoranda to White House chief of staff Susie Wiles expressing concern about Stephen Miller's efforts to suspend habeas corpus for undocumented immigrants, and the idea of invoking the Insurrection Act over protests against mass deportation.

In July 2025, Trump named Scharf as the chair of the National Capital Planning Commission. In a public meeting in September, Scharf asserted that the commission lacked the authority to halt the demolition of the East Wing. In April 2026, he voted to approve the White House State Ballroom. In June, Scharf voted to advance the United States Triumphal Arch.

== White House Counsel (2026–present) ==
In August 2026, Trump named Scharf as his White House counsel. In November 2026 Scharf said that members of Congress could be criminally prosecuted for conducting oversight of the White House. In a letter dated November 9, 2026, Scharf wrote to Congressman Robert Garcia that Congressional investigations cannot be employed to exercise powers of criminal prosecution assigned to the executive and judiciary. "These principles require Congress to identify a legitimate legislative purpose underlying its investigative Acts. Failure to do so in this context represents a clear abuse of power and an affront to our constitutional system of government and to the rule of law."

== Views ==
In 2006, Scharf told The Daily Princetonian that he disagreed with former New Jersey governor Christine Todd Whitman's sentiment that the Republican Party should be more moderate. He opposed the nomination of Arizona senator John McCain at the 2008 Republican National Convention, arguing that McCain had "snubbed" the Republican Party on free speech, immigration, judicial appointments, and tax cuts. At a candidate forum in Springfield, Missouri, in May 2024, Scharf stated that he believed that the 2020 presidential election was "stolen" and "rigged". In July, he told Missourinet that he believed the Missouri State Board of Education and the Missouri Department of Elementary and Secondary Education had not done enough for students, accusing the department of being one entity of the "establishment".

Political offices
Preceded by Stefanie Feldman	White House Staff Secretary; 2025–2026	Succeeded by Ben Moss
Legal offices
Preceded by David Warrington	White House Counsel; 2026–present	Incumbent
