= Stuart Delery =

American lawyer (born 1968)

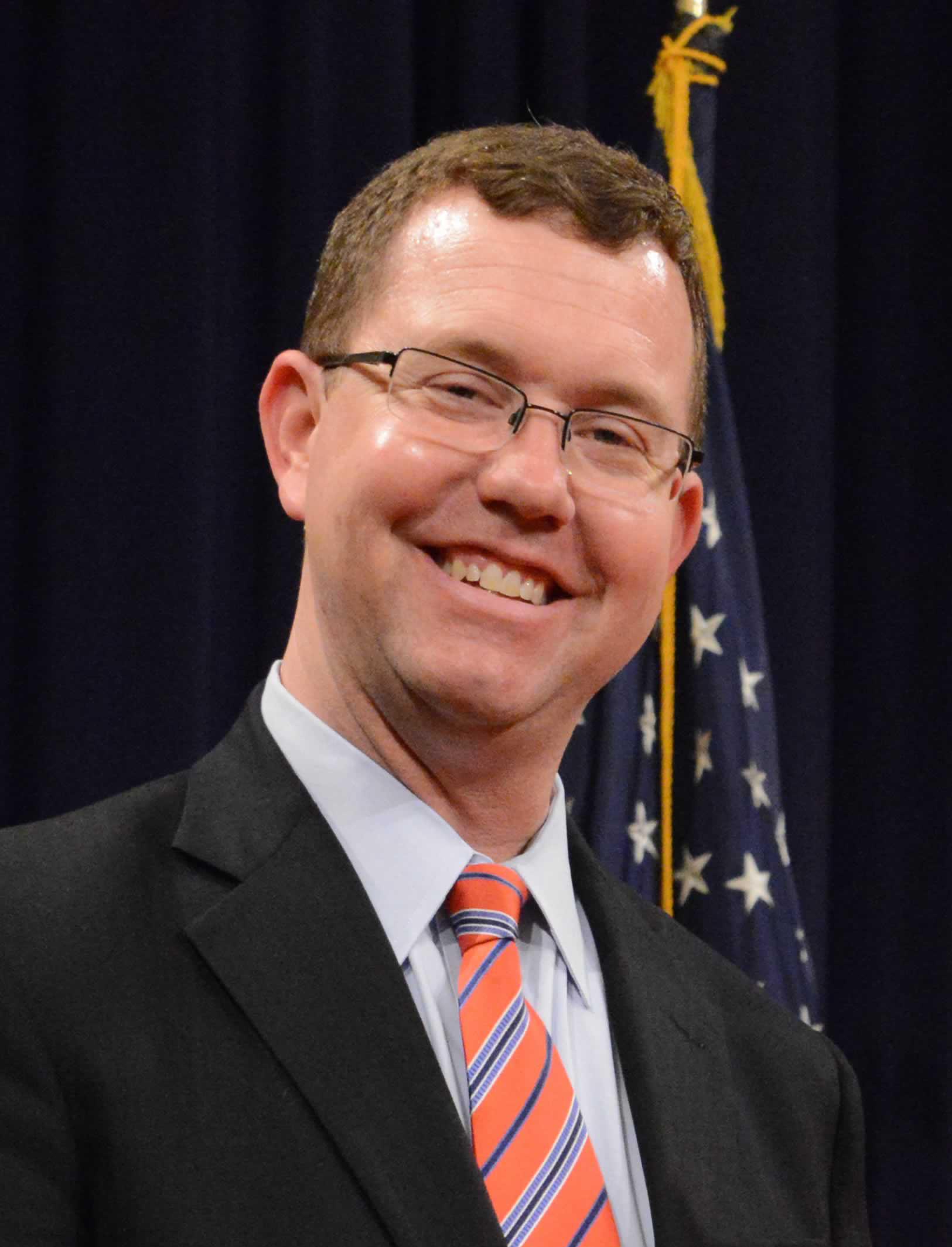
- Delery in 2015

White House Counsel
- In office July 1, 2022 – September 11, 2023
- President: Joe Biden
- Preceded by: Dana Remus
- Succeeded by: Ed Siskel

United States Associate Attorney General
- Acting
- In office September 15, 2014 – April 17, 2016
- President: Barack Obama
- Preceded by: Tony West
- Succeeded by: William Baer

United States Assistant Attorney General for the Civil Division
- In office March 12, 2012 – April 17, 2016; Acting: March 12, 2012 – August 1, 2013
- President: Barack Obama
- Preceded by: Tony West
- Succeeded by: Jody Hunt

Personal details
- Born: Stuart Frank Delery; 1968 (age 57–58) New Orleans, Louisiana, U.S.
- Party: Democratic
- Education: University of Virginia (BA); Yale University (JD)

Stuart Frank Delery (born 1968) is an American attorney who served as White House Counsel from July 2022 to September 2023. Previously, he served as Deputy Counsel to the President in the Biden administration and as Acting United States Associate Attorney General from 2014 to 2016.

== Education ==
Delery earned a Bachelor of Arts degree from the University of Virginia in 1990 and a Juris Doctor from Yale Law School in 1993. He served as a law clerk for Justices Sandra Day O'Connor and Byron White, in addition to Gerald Bard Tjoflat of the United States Court of Appeals for the Eleventh Circuit.

== Career ==
Delery joined the United States Department of Justice in 2009 as the chief of staff and counselor to the United States Deputy Attorney General. He later served as a senior counselor to the United States Attorney General. From March 2012 to September 2014, Delery served as the 35th Assistant Attorney General for the Civil Division. After the resignation of Tony West, Delery served as acting Associate Attorney General from 2014 to 2016. Delery stepped down from his position in April 2016.

After leaving the Department of Justice, Delery worked as a partner at Gibson, Dunn & Crutcher in Washington, D.C., where he specialized in white collar defense, constitutional law, and national security. He also maintained a pro bono practice, where he specialized in LGBT and immigration cases.

In July 2022, Delery became White House Counsel after the departure of Dana Remus. He is the first openly gay person to hold this role.

== Personal life ==
Delery is gay. Upon his nomination as associate attorney general in 2012, he became the highest-ranking openly-gay person serving in the United States Department of Justice.

== See also ==
- List of law clerks for the sixth seat of the Supreme Court of the United States
- List of law clerks for the eighth seat of the Supreme Court of the United States

Legal offices
Preceded by Dana Remus	White House Counsel; 2022–2023	Succeeded by Ed Siskel
