= Emmet Flood =

American lawyer (born 1956)

White House Counsel
- Acting
- In office October 17, 2018 – December 10, 2018
- President: Donald Trump
- Preceded by: Don McGahn
- Succeeded by: Pat Cipollone

Personal details
- Born: Emmet Thomas Flood IV; 1956 (age 69–70) Chicago, Illinois, U.S.
- Party: Republican
- Education: University of Dallas (BA); University of Texas, Austin (MA, PhD); Yale University (JD)

Emmet Thomas Flood IV is an American attorney who served as the interim White House counsel to U.S. President Donald Trump from October 17, 2018, to December 10, 2018, following the resignation of Don McGahn. He also served as a special counsel during the George W. Bush administration.

== Early life and education ==
Flood attended Fenwick High School in Oak Park, Illinois, graduating in 1974.

Flood obtained a Bachelor of Arts from the University of Dallas in 1978. He received a Master of Arts and a Doctor of Philosophy from the University of Texas at Austin in 1981 and 1986, respectively. His doctoral thesis was entitled Philosophy and narrative form. He went on to earn a Juris Doctor from Yale Law School in 1991.

He was an Andrew W. Mellon Foundation fellow at Wesleyan University from 1987 to 1988, where he delivered a colloquium entitled: "Some Uses of Narrative in the History of Philosophy: Synoptic Judgment and Philosophical Plot".

== Career ==
Flood was a law clerk for Judge Ralph K. Winter of the United States Court of Appeals for the Second Circuit and for Associate Justice Antonin Scalia of the Supreme Court of the United States.

Flood advised President Bill Clinton during his impeachment process. Flood's law firm also represented Hillary Clinton on matters relating to the Clinton email controversy.

Flood represented Dick Cheney in response to Wilson v. Cheney, a civil lawsuit filed by Valerie Plame for his alleged role in the Plame affair.

Flood advised Virginia governor Bob McDonnell on his response to the corruption investigation into his activities. Flood was retained by Cameron International to defend them after the Deepwater Horizon oil spill.

In 2017, Flood was offered a job in the Trump administration, though he declined. In March, 2018, Flood met with President Donald Trump in the Oval Office to discuss the White House's response to the Special Counsel investigation.

On May 2, 2018, it was reported that Flood would be replacing Ty Cobb as the White House attorney dealing with the investigation of President Donald Trump by Special Counsel Robert Mueller.

On October 18, 2018, Flood was appointed assistant to the president and counsel to the president, replacing Don McGahn, to temporarily hold the position until the hiring of Pat Cipollone is complete. He demitted office on December 10, 2018.

== Private sector ==
He is a partner at Williams & Connolly. He wrote a response in late April 2019 to Attorney General William Barr concerning the Mueller Report.

== Personal life ==
He served on the advisory council of the Catholic Charities Legal Network.

== Publications ==
- Flood, Emmet T. (1982). "Augustine and the classical tradition of rhetoric". History of Education. 11 (4): 237–250. doi:10.1080/0046760820110401. ISSN 0046-760X.
- Flood, Emmet T. (1987). "Descartes's Comedy of Error". MLN. 102 (4): 847–866. doi:10.2307/2905794. ISSN 0026-7910. JSTOR 2905794.
- Flood, Emmet T. (1988). "The Narrative Structure of Augustine's Confessions". International Philosophical Quarterly. 28 (2): 141–162. doi:10.5840/ipq19882822. ISSN 0019-0365.
- Flood, Emmet T. (1991). "Fact Construction and Judgment in Constitutional Adjudication". The Yale Law Journal. 100 (6): 1795–1814. doi:10.2307/796786. ISSN 0044-0094. JSTOR 796786.

== See also ==
- List of law clerks for the ninth seat of the Supreme Court of the United States

Legal offices
Preceded by Don McGahn	White House Counsel; Acting; 2018	Succeeded by Pat Cipollone
