= Where We Keep the Light =

2026 memoir by Josh Shapiro

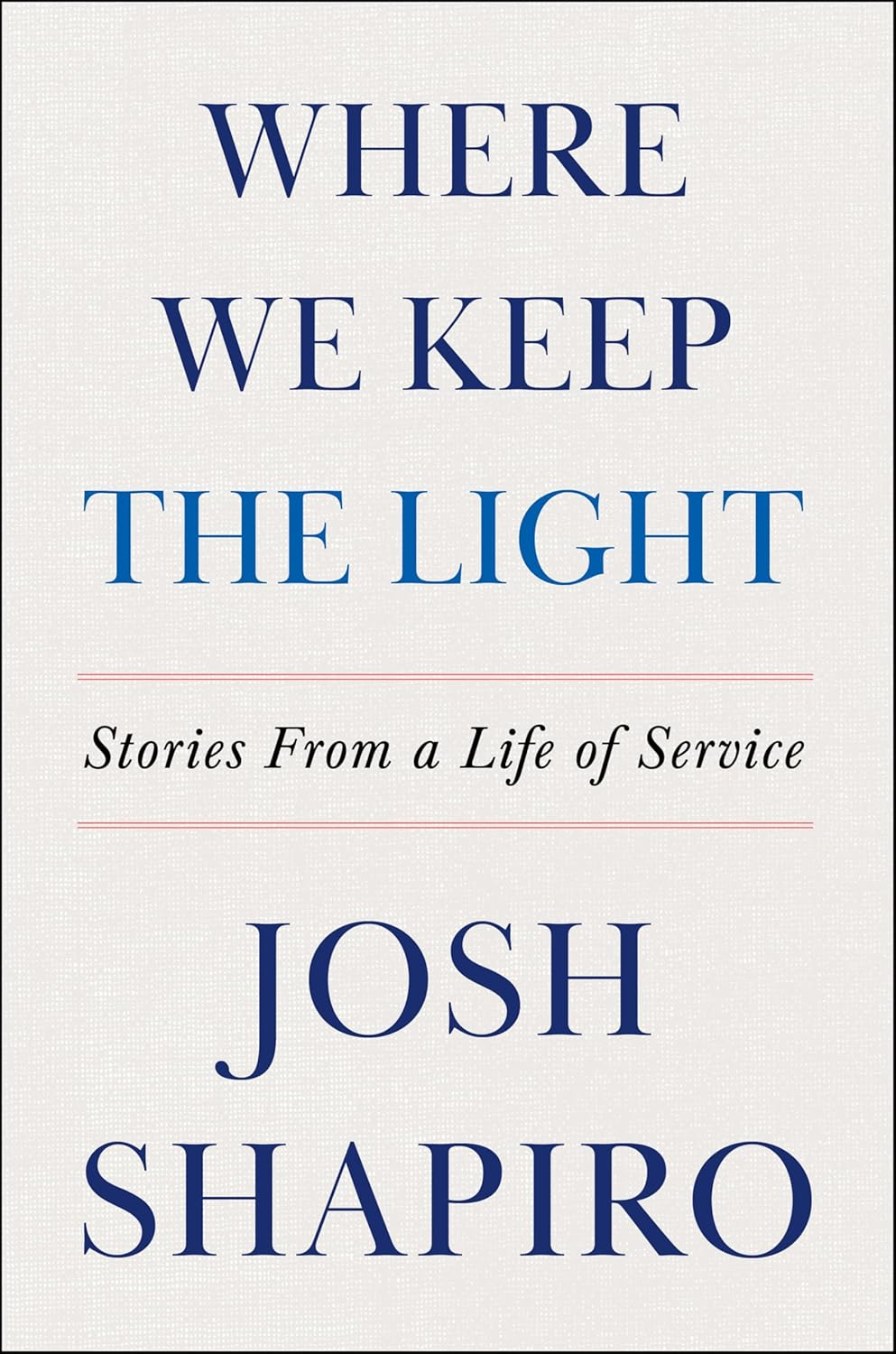
- Author: Josh Shapiro
- Language: English
- Publication date: January 27, 2026
- ISBN: 978-0-063-46390-5

Where We Keep the Light: Stories from a Life of Service is a memoir by Josh Shapiro, the 44th governor of Pennsylvania since 2023. The book was published on January 27, 2026, by HarperCollins.

== Background ==
Shapiro is a potential Democratic presidential candidate in the 2028 election.

== Content ==
Excerpts of the memoir were released prior to its publication.

=== Early life ===
Sections of the memoir focus on Shapiro's childhood, which he characterized as a "unhappy childhood home".

=== 2024 vice presidential consideration ===
Shapiro recounted his experience under consideration for Vice President Kamala Harris' running mate in the 2024 presidential election.

Shapiro characterized his vetting process as unnecessarily contentious', including reportedly being asked by former White House Counsel Dana Remus if he had ever been an agent of the Israeli government. "Had I been a double agent for Israel? Was she kidding? I told her how offensive the question was," Shapiro wrote. Remus also reportedly asked Shapiro "Have you ever communicated with an undercover agent of Israel?".

Shapiro wrote that the line of questioning "said a lot about some of the people around the VP." "It nagged at me that their questions weren’t really about substance," Shapiro wrote. "Rather, they were questioning my ideology, my approach, my world view."

Shapiro had previously volunteered on an Israeli army base in high school. At the start of his career, he volunteered at the Israeli Embassy's public affairs division.

== Reception ==
Aaron Keyak, Deputy Special Envoy to Monitor and Combat Antisemitism under Joe Biden, described the double agent question as "horrifying", adding that "It is a blatantly antisemitic question."

CNN on January 19, 2026, reported that Minnesota Governor Tim Walz, who was chosen as Harris's running mate, was also asked by her vetting team if he had been an agent of the Chinese government. The question was prompted by a review of Walz's prior travel to China. CNN wrote that sources close to the vetting process noted "The crux of vetting is asking uncomfortable and even farfetched questions, especially ones that could be raised by your opponents. ‘Have you ever had an affair?’ ‘Have you ever embezzled state funds?’ ‘Have you ever been an agent for another country?’ The point isn't that you believe any of it to be true."
