= David Warrington =

American attorney (born 1967)

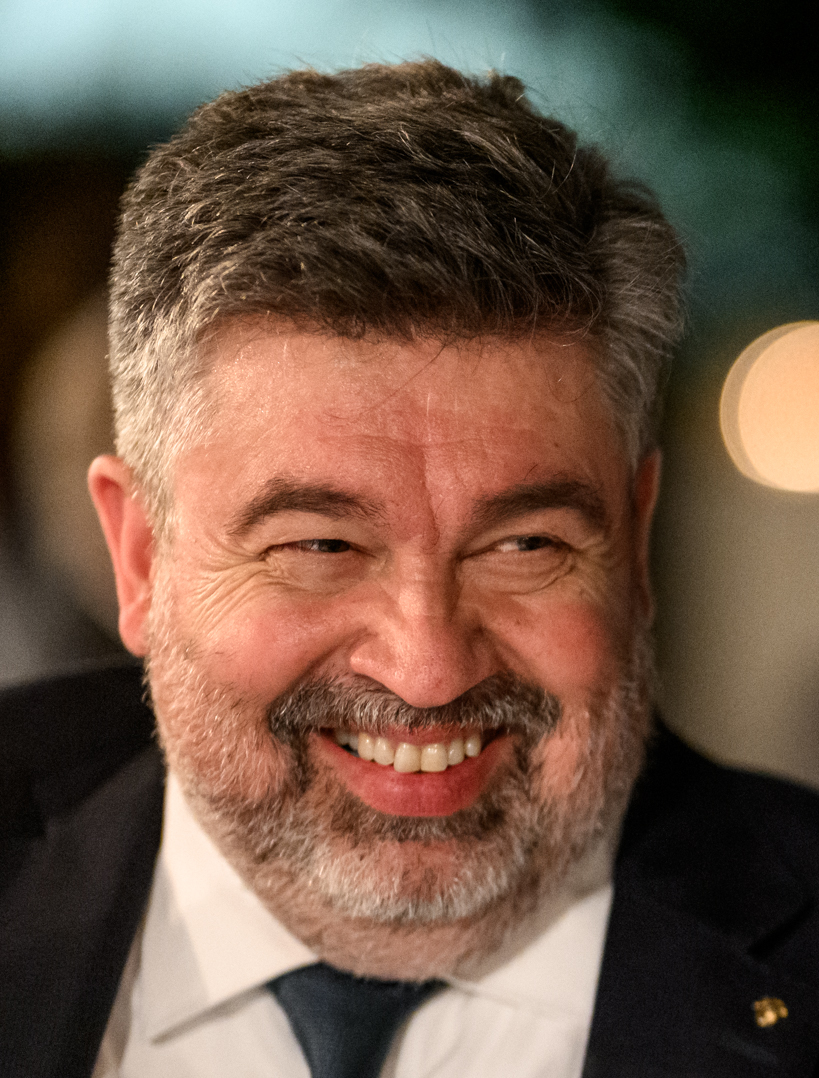
- Warrington in 2025

White House Counsel
- In office January 20, 2025 – September 1, 2026
- President: Donald Trump
- Deputy: Stephen Kenny
- Preceded by: Ed Siskel
- Succeeded by: Will Scharf

Personal details
- Born: David Alan Warrington; September 16, 1967 (age 59)
- Party: Republican
- Spouse: Debra Baird (m. 1990)
- Children: 4
- Education: Georgetown University (BA); George Mason University (JD)

Military service
- Allegiance: United States
- Branch/service: United States Marine Corps
- Years of service: 1985–1991
- Rank: Sergeant

David Alan Warrington (born September 16, 1967) is an American attorney who served as the White House counsel from 2025 to 2026.

Warrington enlisted in the United States Marine Corps in 1985, serving for six years. He later enrolled in Georgetown University, where he majored in philosophy and government, and graduated from Antonin Scalia Law School at George Mason University with a Juris Doctor. In 2000, Warrington helped establish the National Association for Gun Rights. By the following year, he had served as the national director of the Young Americans for Freedom and the chairman of the Virginia chapter of the National Federation of Republican Assemblies, and begun working as a real estate appraiser and a partner at Burkett Warrington. In 2001, he unsuccessfully ran in the Republican primary in the 2001 Virginia House of Delegates election for the state's 67th district.

Warrington assisted in Texas representative Ron Paul's 2008 presidential campaign and served as his general counsel for his 2012 presidential campaign. For his work in defending Paul's delegates at that year's Republican National Convention, Don McGahn, the general counsel for Donald Trump's 2016 presidential campaign, hired Warrington. He later joined Harmeet Dhillon's firm, Dhillon Law Group, and defended several Trump allies, including Sebastian Gorka and Michael Flynn.

Warrington represented Trump in a personal capacity and served as his general counsel in his 2024 presidential campaign. In December 2024, Trump named Warrington as his White House counsel. In August 2026, Trump announced that Warrington would leave his position as the White House counsel to join the private sector.

== Early life and education (1967–2006) ==
David Alan Warrington was born on September 16, 1967. Warrington was the son of a World War II veteran who served for two decades in the United States Air Force. He was raised in Milton, Delaware. Warrington graduated from Cape Henlopen High School in 1985. At Cape Henlopen, he played soccer.

Warrington enlisted in the United States Marine Corps after graduating from high school, becoming a private first class by January 1986. That month, he completed infantry training at Marine Corps Base Camp Lejeune. Warrington said he was inspired to join the Marine Corps after reading Richard Tregaskis's Guadalcanal Diary (1943). In September 1986, he was promoted to corporal at Marine Barracks Brunswick Maine. Warrington's tenure in the Marine Corps, which lasted for six years, involved guarding U.S. embassies in Chad and Israel.

By October 1990, Warrington had moved to Fairfax, Virginia. That month, he married Debra K. Baird. They had three children. Warrington later attended Georgetown University, majoring in philosophy and government, and graduated from Antonin Scalia Law School at George Mason University with a Juris Doctor.

== Career ==
=== Early career and political efforts (1991–2016) ===
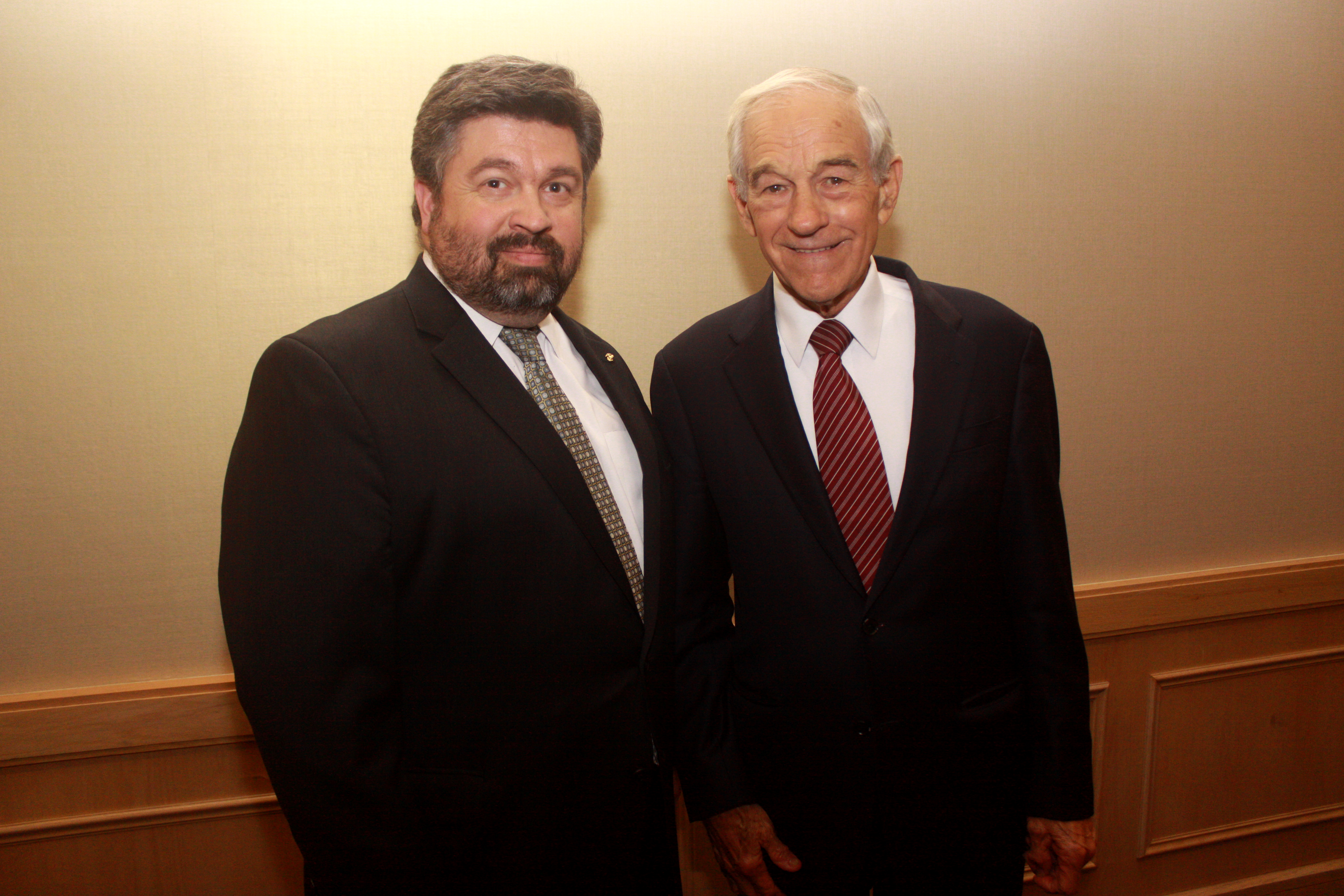
Warrington (left) and Ron Paul (right) in 2013

In 2000, Warrington helped establish the National Association for Gun Rights. By 2001, he had begun working as a real estate appraiser and a partner at Burkett Warrington. Warrington additionally served as the national director of the Young Americans for Freedom and the chairman of the Virginia chapter of the National Federation of Republican Assemblies. In July, Warrington filed to run in the 2001 Virginia House of Delegates election for the state's 67th district. He ran on an anti-tax platform. In the Republican primary, Warrington finished last, losing to John Clerici and Gary A. Reese.

Warrington assisted in Texas representative Ron Paul's 2008 presidential campaign. He served as the general counsel for Paul's 2012 presidential campaign, defending Paul's delegates at the 2012 Republican National Convention amid challenges from Mitt Romney's 2012 presidential campaign. By April 2015, Warrington was the chairman of the National Association for Gun Rights. He represented The Washington Post and several television stations after they mounted a challenge to the Alexandria General District Court's rule prohibiting television cameras.

=== Trump legal work and campaign counsel (2016–2024) ===
In 2016, amid concerns that attendees at that year's Republican National Convention could mount a similar challenge as Romney's campaign had to Paul's campaign, Don McGahn, Donald Trump's general counsel for his presidential campaign, hired Warrington. In January 2018, he was appointed a member of the law firm Kutak Rock. He later joined Harmeet Dhillon's firm, Dhillon Law Group. At Dhillon, Warrington represented several Trump allies, including Jesse Benton, Sebastian Gorka, Michael Flynn, John McEntee, and Kylie and Amy Kremer. Additionally, he represented Imaad Zuberi, a major donor to Trump's first inauguration whose sentence was commuted by Trump in May 2025.

By October 2021, Warrington had begun representing Trump in a personal capacity. That month, he responded to a subpoena sent by the House Select Committee to Investigate the January 6th Attack on the United States Capitol to Trump. Warrington's work for Trump included civil and constitutional cases. By July 2024, Warrington had begun serving as the general counsel for Trump's 2024 presidential campaign. He led an investigation into allegations that Boris Epshteyn sought payments from potential presidential appointees, including Scott Bessent, who later became Trump's nominee for secretary of the treasury.

== White House Counsel (2025–2026) ==
After Donald Trump's victory in the 2024 presidential election, Warrington was among several candidates—including Stanley Woodward and Bill McGinley—to serve as the White House counsel. Trump named McGinley as his White House counsel. On December 4, he abruptly replaced McGinley with Warrington, who was preferred by Susie Wiles, Trump's co-campaign manager who was set to become the White House chief of staff. Trump had been expected to name Warrington, but as Wiles and most of her staff were attending a conference in Las Vegas in November, Boris Epshteyn advocated for McGinley. Warrington planned out possible legal counters to Trump's initial executive orders. After Trump's second inauguration, Warrington provided him with options on granting clemency to the rioters involved in the January 6 Capitol attack. He additionally handled a review of cases related to the attack.

The New York Times described Warrington's role as an enabler of Trump's legally aggressive policies; Chris LaCivita, Trump's co-campaign manager in his 2024 presidential campaign, told the Times that Warrington focuses on the "art of the possible". The responsibilities of his role notably differed from his predecessors in Trump's first presidency, who were forced to vocally combat the investigations into Trump. Warrington described his office as a "litigation-heavy shop"—in contrast to prior administrations that were not configured for litigation. Warrington established non-legally binding guidance allowing Trump and Vice President JD Vance to ask about criminal and civil investigations. According to Alice Marie Johnson, the White House pardon czar, Wiles and Warrington review each case in requests for pardons.

Warrington's office approved the federal government's grant pause in January 2025. After Judge James Boasberg ordered that the Trump administration return deported Venezuelans who were en route to El Salvador in J.G.G. v. Trump, Warrington and Deputy Attorney General Todd Blanche formed a legal counterargument that the order did not apply to planes that had already left American airspace, offering a basis to defy Boasberg's order. In May, ABC News reported that Warrington and Attorney General Pam Bondi had approved the Department of Defense's acquisition of P4-HBJ from the House of Thani, the royal family of Qatar. The following month, Trump ordered an investigation into whether aides to former president Joe Biden concealed alleged declines in his mental state, tasking Warrington to lead the inquiry in conjunction with Bondi. In August 2026, Trump announced that Warrington would leave his position as the White House counsel for the private sector.

== Views ==
As a candidate, Warrington was a libertarian populist. He advocated for lower taxes, a smaller state government, transparency in schools, and traditional values. Warrington supported tax credits for remote work, reforming the Virginia Department of Transportation, and constructing another Potomac River crossing.

== Electoral history ==
2001 Virginia House of Delegates Republican primary for Virginia's 67th district
Party	Candidate	Votes	%
Republican	Gary A. Reese	969	39.5
Republican	John Clerici	772	31.5
Republican	David Warrington	712	29.0
Total votes		2,453	100.0

== Works cited ==
- Haberman, Maggie; Swan, Jonathan (2026). Regime Change: Inside the Imperial Presidency of Donald Trump. New York: Simon & Schuster. ISBN 978-1-6680-6724-6.

Legal offices
Preceded by Ed Siskel	White House Counsel; 2025–2026	Succeeded by Will Scharf
