= Ed Siskel =

American lawyer (born 1972)

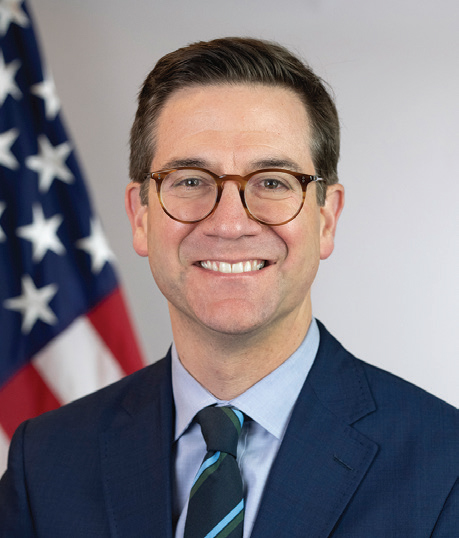
- Official portrait, 2023

White House Counsel
- In office September 11, 2023 – January 20, 2025
- President: Joe Biden
- Preceded by: Stuart Delery
- Succeeded by: David Warrington

Personal details
- Born: 1972 (age 53–54)
- Party: Democratic
- Relatives: Gene Siskel (uncle)
- Education: Wesleyan University (BA); University of Chicago (JD)

Edward N. Siskel (born 1972) is an American lawyer from Chicago who served as the White House Counsel in the administration of U.S. President Joe Biden.

== Early life and education ==
Siskel was born in 1972 and grew up in Chicago. He graduated from Wesleyan University in 1994. He entered the University of Chicago Law School in 1997, becoming editor-in-chief of the University of Chicago Law Review. He graduated in 2000 with a J.D. degree.

After law school, Siskel was a law clerk for Judge Dorothy Wright Nelson of the U.S. Court of Appeals for the Ninth Circuit from 2000 to 2001 and for U.S. Supreme Court justice John Paul Stevens from 2001 to 2002.

== Professional career ==
From 2002 until 2005, Siskel was a lawyer for the WilmerHale law firm. From 2005 until 2009, Siskel was a prosecutor in the U.S. attorney's office in Chicago and was an associate deputy attorney general in the United States Department of Justice. He later worked in the White House counsel's office during the administration of President Barack Obama, including as Deputy Counsel. In that role, Siskel oversaw the White House's legal responses to congressional oversight and to complex challenges such as the rollout of the Affordable Care Act.

Siskel then returned to private practice at WilmerHale. From 2017 until 2019, he served in the office of corporation counsel for the City of Chicago under Mayor Rahm Emanuel.

From 2019 until he was named White House Counsel, Siskel was chief legal officer for Chicago-based Grosvenor Holdings LLC.

On August 22, 2023, Siskel was named the designate to serve as White House Counsel, replacing Stuart Delery. Siskel began serving as White House counsel in September 2023.

On March 3, 2025, it was reported that Siskel is joining the law firm of Latham & Watkins.

== Personal life ==
Siskel is the nephew of the late film critic Gene Siskel. He has three younger cousins, Kate (who is a marketing and communications executive at Convergent Energy and Power in New York City), Callie (who is a poet and writer), and Will (who is a coordinator of major league operations for the Atlanta Braves baseball team).

Legal offices
| Preceded by Stuart Delery | White House Counsel; 2023–2025 | Succeeded by David Warrington |
