= White House Office of Gun Violence Prevention =

American office (2023–2025)

The White House Office of Gun Violence Prevention was an office of the White House tasked with carrying out the president's gun violence prevention agenda. President Joe Biden announced the office in the Rose Garden of the White House on September 22, 2023. He appointed Vice President Kamala Harris to oversee the office and three subject experts to lead the work: Stefanie Feldman as director and gun violence survivors Greg Jackson and Rob Wilcox as deputy directors.

Within hours of the inauguration of President Donald Trump on January 20, 2025, the office was shut down and its White House web page taken offline.

== Origin ==
March for Our Lives is credited with first calling for a White House Office of Gun Violence Prevention. Senator Chris Murphy and Congressman Maxwell Frost authored legislation directing the president to create an Office of Gun Violence Prevention in the U. S. Justice Department.

== Accomplishments ==
The White House Office of Gun Violence Prevention announced dozens of executive actions to reduce gun violence, helped federal agencies distribute funding to communities impacted by gun violence, and oversaw implementation of the Bipartisan Safer Communities Act. The office summarized its first year of work in a report. After Donald Trump closed the office, numerous members of Congress and gun violence prevention leaders heralded the office's accomplishments and supported legislation to create a permanent office of gun violence prevention inside the U.S. Department of Justice.

== Criticisms ==
The office faced sharp criticism from the National Rifle Association of America and the National Shooting Sports Foundation.

== Members ==
- Oversight: Kamala Harris (Vice President, White House official in charge of supervising its work)
- Director: Stefanie Feldman
- Deputy Director/Special Assistant to the President: Greg Jackson
- Deputy Director: Rob Wilcox
