= Pat Cipollone =

American lawyer (born 1966)

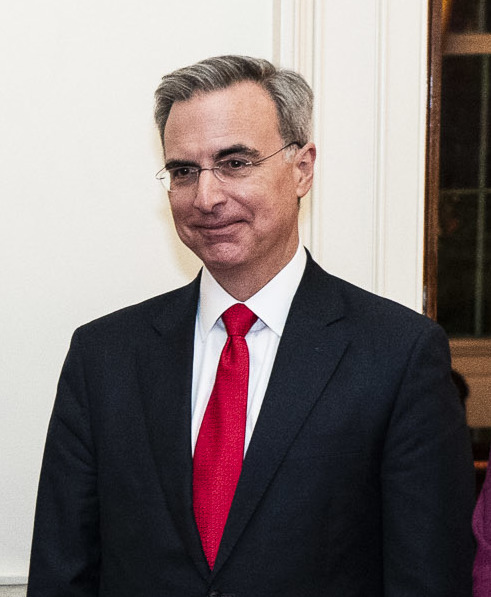

White House Counsel
- In office December 10, 2018 – January 20, 2021
- President: Donald Trump
- Preceded by: Emmet Flood (Acting)
- Succeeded by: Dana Remus

Personal details
- Born: Pasquale Anthony Cipollone; May 6, 1966 (age 60) New York City, U.S.
- Party: Republican
- Spouse: Rebecca Thelen
- Children: 10
- Education: Fordham University (BA); University of Chicago (JD)

Pasquale Anthony "Pat" Cipollone (born May 6, 1966) is an American attorney who served as White House Counsel under President Donald Trump. While in office he defended Trump in his first impeachment trial. He objected to Trump's efforts to overturn the 2020 presidential election, and played a key role in the January 6 committee hearings, specifically the committee's sixth hearing.

== Early life ==
Cipollone's father was an Italian immigrant and factory worker; his mother was a homemaker. He spent most of his childhood in the Bronx. The family moved to Northern Kentucky, where he graduated from Covington Catholic High School in 1984. He graduated as class valedictorian from Fordham University in 1988, with a Bachelor of Arts in economics and political philosophy. He enrolled at the University of Chicago Law School, where he was managing editor of the University of Chicago Law Review, earning a J.D. degree in 1991.

== Legal career ==
Cipollone was a law clerk for Judge Danny Boggs of the United States Court of Appeals for the Sixth Circuit (Cincinnati, Ohio) from 1991 to 1992, and served as an assistant to Attorney General William P. Barr from 1992 to 1993.

He was a partner at the law firm Kirkland & Ellis, and prior to taking over as White House Counsel was a partner at Stein, Mitchell, Cipollone, Beato & Missner, where he practiced commercial litigation. His clients included President Donald Trump, Radio Ingraham LLC, and Sony Entertainment.

As of July 2022, Cipollone was a named partner of the Los Angeles law firm Ellis George Cipollone O'Brien Annaguey LLP d/b/a Ellis George Cipollone.

Cipollone's financial disclosure reported an income of $6.7 million in 2017–2018.

== White House Counsel ==
Cipollone was named White House Counsel by President Donald Trump in October 2018. He succeeded Don McGahn who left office on October 17, 2018. Emmet Flood served as counsel until Cipollone's background security check was completed. Cipollone officially assumed the role on December 10, 2018.

In his role as White House Counsel, Cipollone was the public face of the White House response to the impeachment inquiry into Donald Trump. In October 2019, he signed an eight-page letter to Democratic House leaders stating that the White House would not cooperate in any way with the inquiry. He laid out a broad view of executive authority and said that Democrats' actions violate "the Constitution, the rule of law, and every past precedent". This letter has been cited as evidence for the charge that President Trump was obstructing the House's impeachment inquiry.

In December 2019, Cipollone wrote two letters in response to an invitation from Jerry Nadler, chair of the House Judiciary Committee, for the White House or Trump himself to participate in its hearings. He said the White House and Trump would not participate because the planned hearings do not "provide the president with any semblance of a fair process" and the inquiry is "completely baseless".

On January 14, 2020, Cipollone was named to the team of attorneys representing President Donald Trump in the impeachment hearing case.

On January 31, 2020, it was reported that Cipollone was present at a May 2019 White House meeting where President Trump directed his national security adviser John Bolton to "extract damaging information on Democrats from Ukrainian officials."

=== Objections to Trump's false claims of 2020 election fraud ===
In January 2021, Cipollone was present at a White House meeting where he reportedly argued against a proposal to replace acting attorney general Jeffrey A. Rosen with Jeffrey Clark, the acting head of the Justice Department's Civil Division. Clark, unlike Rosen, was willing to pursue Trump's baseless claims of election fraud and help Trump overturn the 2020 election results. Specifically, Clark wanted to send a letter to Georgia state legislators urging them to void Biden's win in their state, and Cipollone strongly objected to this. One official later said, "Pat pretty much saved Rosen's job that day."

While Trump pursued schemes to stay in power that led to the January 6, 2021 attack on the U.S. Capitol, Cipollone and members of his team threatened to resign on principle. On March 31, 2022, Jared Kushner told the House select committee investigating the January 6 attack that he had been aware of Cipollone's objections but that he had dismissed and ignored them as mere "whining". The tape of Kushner's interview was revealed at the committee's first public hearing on June 9, 2022.

=== January 6 committee hearings ===
Cipollone's comments and actions during his final days as Trump's White House Counsel have played a key role in the January 6 committee hearings, specifically the committee's sixth hearing.

On June 28, 2022, former Trump White House aide Cassidy Hutchinson testified that Cipollone discussed potential criminal legal exposure for Trump's planned rally on January 6. "Pat was concerned it would look like we were obstructing justice or obstructing the Electoral College count", she testified, "that it would look like we were obstructing what was happening on Capitol Hill." Obstructing an official proceeding is a felony under U.S. law, and as part of a dispute with John Eastman, U.S. District Judge David O. Carter ruled with the committee, stating "the Court finds it more likely than not that President Trump corruptly attempted to obstruct the Joint Session of Congress."

"We had conversations about potentially obstructing justice or defrauding the electoral count", Hutchinson testified about discussions with Cipollone. Carter's ruling also cited "conspiracy to defraud the United States", by circumventing the Electoral Count Act.

Hutchinson testified to being present for dramatic conversations between Cipollone and White House Chief of Staff Mark Meadows on January 6, with Hutchinson quoting Cipollone as saying "Mark, something needs to be done or people are going to die and the blood is going to be on your f'ing hands." Hutchinson quoted Cipollone as saying, "Mark, we need to do something more. They're literally calling for the vice president to be f'ing hung", with Meadows responding "you heard [the president], Pat. He thinks Mike deserves it. He doesn't think they're doing anything wrong."

Committee Vice Chair Liz Cheney repeatedly called for Cipollone to testify before the committee, saying a week before Hutchinson's testimony “our evidence shows that Pat Cipollone and his office tried to do what was right" and spoke for the committee stating "we think the American people deserve to hear from Mr. Cipollone personally. He should appear before this committee." Cipollone's distant predecessor as White House Counsel, John Dean, a former Republican who had served in the Nixon administration during the Watergate scandal, called on Cipollone to follow his example and testify about Trump to Congress. Cipollone was issued a public subpoena to testify before the committee the day after Hutchinson's testimony. Cipollone complied with the subpoena, meeting with the committee for a videotaped deposition on July 8.

On August 2, 2022, Cipollone was subpoenaed by the Justice Department as part of its investigation into the January 6 United States Capitol attack.

== Personal life ==
Cipollone is a Roman Catholic, a founding member of the National Catholic Prayer Breakfast and a board member of the Catholic Information Center. Conservative commentator Laura Ingraham credited Cipollone with helping her convert to Catholicism in 2002. He has ten children. One of Cipollone's daughters worked as a booker for The Ingraham Angle.

== See also ==
- Trump–Ukraine scandal

Legal offices
Preceded by Emmet Flood; Acting	White House Counsel; 2018–2021	Succeeded by Dana Remus
