= Stefanie Feldman =

American political and policy advisor (born 1988)

Stef Feldman

White House Staff Secretary
- In office May 26, 2023 – January 20, 2025
- President: Joe Biden
- Preceded by: Neera Tanden
- Succeeded by: Will Scharf

Personal details
- Born: July 8, 1988 (age 38) Georgia, U.S.
- Party: Democratic
- Education: Duke University (BA); Yale University (JD)

Stefanie "Stef" Feldman (born July 8, 1988) is an American political and policy advisor who served as White House Staff Secretary and Director of the White House Office of Gun Violence Prevention for Joe Biden. She was also the national policy director for Joe Biden's 2020 presidential campaign. She writes the newsletter The Permanent Campaign.

== Early life and education ==
Feldman was born on July 8, 1988 in Atlanta, Georgia. She graduated from Duke University in 2010, where she received a scholarship through The Robertson Scholars Leadership Program. She also earned a J.D. from Yale Law School.

== Career ==
Feldman started her career in 2011 as a policy advisor to then-Vice President Joe Biden at the White House. During that time, she was part of the team that helped Biden develop legislation and executive actions in response to the Sandy Hook Elementary School shooting. She also worked on climate policy for Vice President Biden.

In 2017, she began working as the policy director for the Biden Institute at the University of Delaware.

Feldman was the National Policy Director for Joe Biden's 2020 presidential campaign. In this role, she served as "Biden’s unofficial climate liaison to unions and environmentalists." She was an economic advisor to Biden. The Washingtonian described Feldman as one of the most influential operatives on the Biden campaign.

In 2020, President Biden appointed Feldman to serve as Deputy Assistant to the President and Senior Advisor to the Domestic Policy Advisor Susan Rice. She was in the Oval Office with Biden to discuss executive actions in the earliest days of his presidency. In 2021, she was described as "a longtime policy guru who knows how Biden thinks so well, some joke she knows Biden policy positions before he does."

In 2023, Biden promoted Feldman to Assistant to the President and Staff Secretary. Biden said, "Stef is one of my longest-serving and most trusted advisors. I asked Stef to join me from the White House to the University of Delaware, to my presidential campaign, and back to the White House because of her talent and tenacious pursuit of policies that make life better for hard-working Americans. I have now asked her to serve as Staff Secretary because I know I can trust her to ensure that I am equipped with the best advice and counsel."

In September 2023, Feldman also took on the role of Director of the first-ever White House Office of Gun Violence Prevention. Biden announced Feldman's appointment during remarks in the Rose Garden. He wrote that Feldman "has capably led my Administration’s gun violence prevention efforts and been a trusted aide for more than a decade." The National Shooting Sports Foundation criticized Feldman's appointment, noting that her "social media is peppered with gun control chest-thumping." Feldman's appointment was criticized in NRA journal America's 1st Freedom.

After leaving the White House, Feldman launched the newsletter The Permanent Campaign.

She has appeared in print and TV interviews on outlets including The New York Times, Scripps, USA Today, CNN, MSNBC, Axios, and Politico. She has also appeared on podcasts.

Political offices
Preceded by Neera Tanden	White House Staff Secretary; 2023–2025	Succeeded by Will Scharf
