= White House Counsel =

Chief legal advisor to the U.S. president

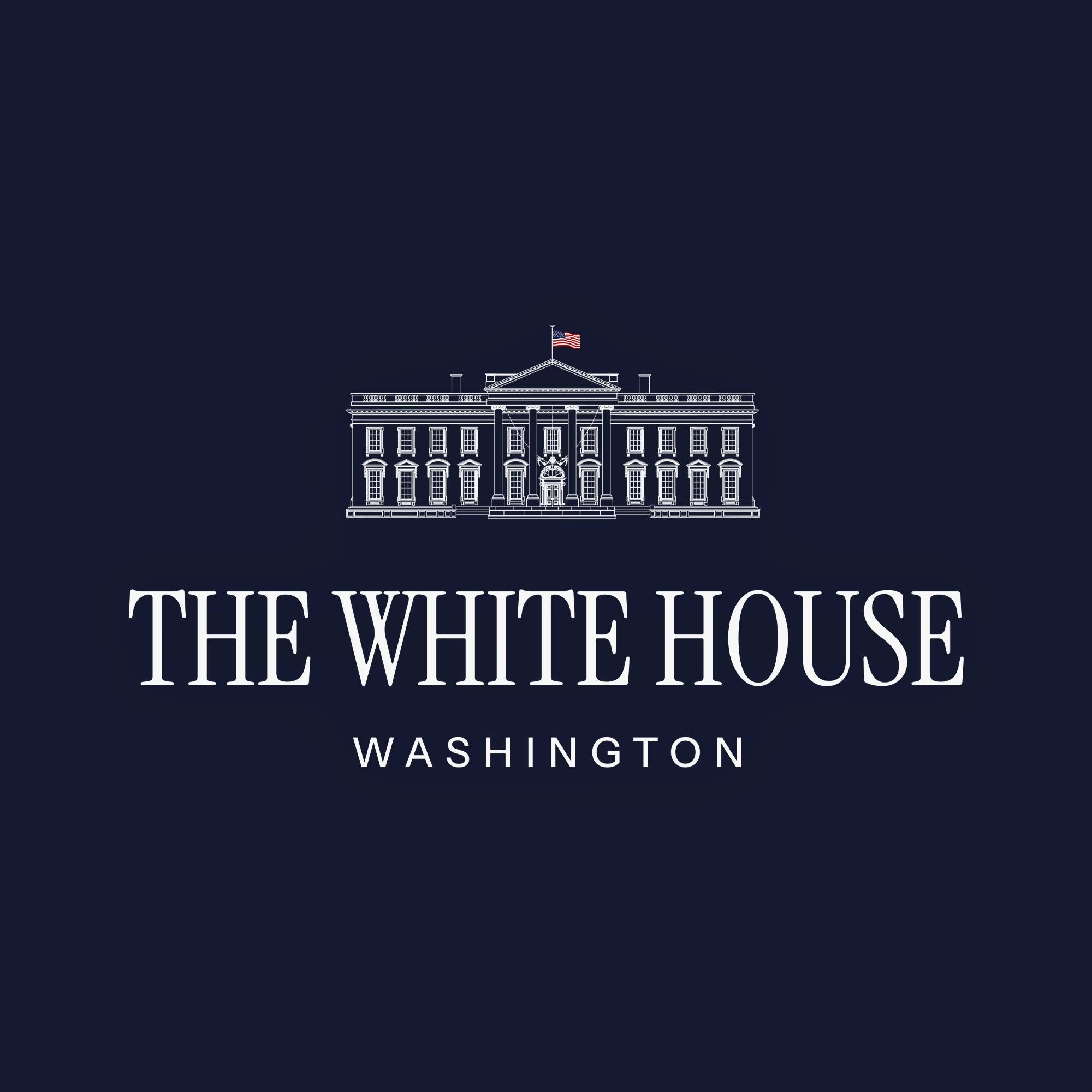

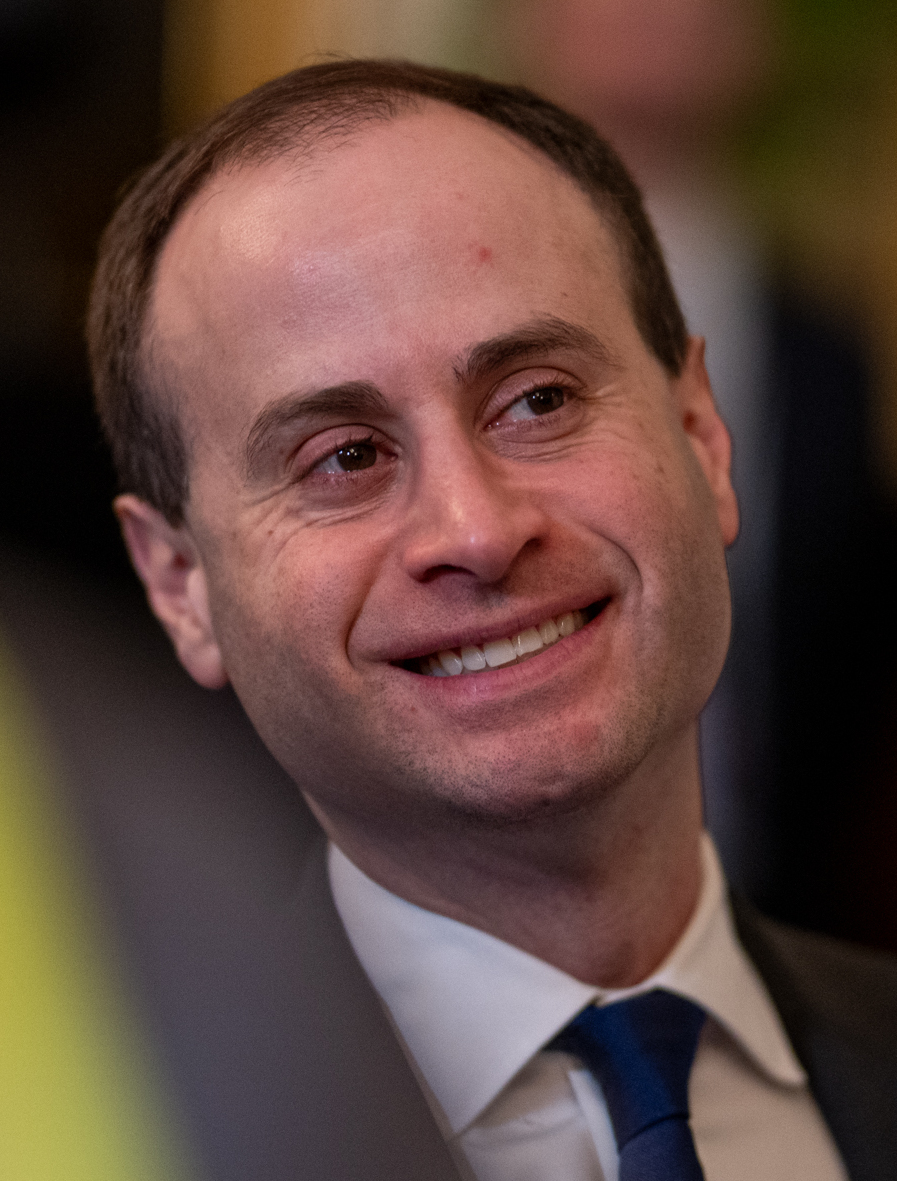
- Incumbent; Will Scharf since September 1, 2026
- Formation: 1943
- First holder: Samuel Rosenman

The White House counsel is a senior staff appointee of the president of the United States whose role is to advise the president on all legal issues concerning the president and their administration. The White House counsel also oversees the Office of White House Counsel, a team of lawyers and support staff who provide legal guidance for the president and the White House Office. At least when the White House counsel is advising the president on legal matters pertaining to the duties or prerogatives of the president, this office is also called counsel to the president. When initially created, it was named simply Special Counsel.

Will Scharf is the current White House counsel, serving since September 1, 2026.

== Responsibilities ==
The Office of Counsel to the president and vice president was created in 1943, and is responsible for advising on all legal aspects of policy questions, legal issues arising in connection with the president's decision to sign or veto legislation, ethical questions, financial disclosures, and conflicts of interest during employment and post employment. The counsel's office also helps define the line between official and political activities, oversees executive appointments and judicial selection, handles presidential pardons, reviews legislation and presidential statements, and handles lawsuits against the president in his role as president, as well as serving as the White House contact for the Department of Justice (DOJ).

== Limitations ==
Although the White House counsel offers legal advice to the president and vice president, the counsel does so in the president's and vice president's official capacity, and does not serve as the president's personal attorney. Therefore, controversy has emerged over the scope of the attorney–client privilege between the counsel and the president and vice president, namely with John Dean of Watergate notoriety. It is clear, however, that the privilege does not apply in strictly personal matters. It also does not apply to legislative proceedings by the U.S. Congress against the president due to allegations of misconduct while in office, such as formal censures or impeachment proceedings. In those situations the president relies on a personal attorney if he desires confidential legal advice.

Like all similarly appointed positions in the White House and Executive Office of the President, the White House counsel's office is also distinct from and separate to the judiciary. It is also different in type to other senior positions which are not simply presidentially appointed but rather are nominated by the president and confirmed by the Senate. In the legal realm, these would be foremost the attorney general of the United States, and their principal deputy and other assistants, who are nominated by the president to oversee the United States Department of Justice, and the solicitor general of the United States (the fourth-ranking official in the Justice Department) and staff, who argue cases before the U.S. Supreme Court (and in lower federal courts) for the Justice Department when it, or the Federal Government or an officer thereof (including the President), is a party to the case. The White House counsel does, however, usually act as the primary contact point between the DOJ and the White House.

== List of White House counsels ==
Denotes acting capacity.

Image	Name	Start	End	President
	Samuel Rosenman	October 2, 1943	February 1, 1946	Franklin D. Roosevelt (1933–1945)
	Samuel Rosenman	October 2, 1943	February 1, 1946	Harry S. Truman (1945–1953)
	Clark Clifford	February 1, 1946	January 31, 1950	Harry S. Truman (1945–1953)
	Charles Murphy	January 31, 1950	January 20, 1953	Harry S. Truman (1945–1953)
	Tom Stephens; On leave	January 20, 1953	April 14, 1953	Dwight D. Eisenhower (1953–1961)
	Bernard Shanley	January 20, 1953	April 14, 1953	Dwight D. Eisenhower (1953–1961)
	Bernard Shanley	April 14, 1953	February 19, 1955	Dwight D. Eisenhower (1953–1961)
	Gerald Morgan	February 19, 1955	November 5, 1958	Dwight D. Eisenhower (1953–1961)
	David Kendall	November 5, 1958	January 20, 1961	Dwight D. Eisenhower (1953–1961)
	Ted Sorensen	January 20, 1961	February 29, 1964	John F. Kennedy (1961–1963)
	Ted Sorensen	January 20, 1961	February 29, 1964	Lyndon B. Johnson (1963–1969)
	Mike Feldman	April 1964	January 17, 1965	Lyndon B. Johnson (1963–1969)
	Lee White	January 17, 1965	February 11, 1966	Lyndon B. Johnson (1963–1969)
	Milton Semer	February 14, 1966	December 31, 1966	Lyndon B. Johnson (1963–1969)
	Harry McPherson	February 11, 1966	October 26, 1967	Lyndon B. Johnson (1963–1969)
	Larry Temple	October 26, 1967	January 20, 1969	Lyndon B. Johnson (1963–1969)
	John Ehrlichman	January 20, 1969	November 4, 1969	Richard Nixon (1969–1974)
	Chuck Colson	November 6, 1969	July 9, 1970	Richard Nixon (1969–1974)
	John Dean	July 9, 1970	April 30, 1973	Richard Nixon (1969–1974)
	Len Garment	April 30, 1973	August 9, 1974	Richard Nixon (1969–1974)
	Philip Buchen	August 9, 1974	January 20, 1977	Gerald Ford (1974–1977)
	Robert Lipshutz	January 20, 1977	October 1, 1979	Jimmy Carter (1977–1981)
	Lloyd Cutler	October 1, 1979	January 20, 1981	Jimmy Carter (1977–1981)
	Fred Fielding	January 20, 1981	May 23, 1986	Ronald Reagan (1981–1989)
	Peter Wallison	May 23, 1986	March 20, 1987	Ronald Reagan (1981–1989)
	Arthur Culvahouse	March 20, 1987	January 20, 1989	Ronald Reagan (1981–1989)
	Boyden Gray	January 20, 1989	January 20, 1993	George H. W. Bush (1989–1993)
	Bernard Nussbaum	January 20, 1993	March 8, 1994	Bill Clinton (1993–2001)
	Lloyd Cutler	March 8, 1994	October 1, 1994	Bill Clinton (1993–2001)
	Abner Mikva	October 1, 1994	November 1, 1995	Bill Clinton (1993–2001)
	Jack Quinn	November 1, 1995	February 1997	Bill Clinton (1993–2001)
	Chuck Ruff	February 1997	August 6, 1999	Bill Clinton (1993–2001)
	Cheryl Mills; Acting	August 6, 1999	September 1999	Bill Clinton (1993–2001)
	Beth Nolan	September 1999	January 20, 2001	Bill Clinton (1993–2001)
	Alberto Gonzales	January 20, 2001	February 3, 2005	George W. Bush (2001–2009)
	Harriet Miers	February 3, 2005	January 31, 2007	George W. Bush (2001–2009)
	Fred Fielding	January 31, 2007	January 20, 2009	George W. Bush (2001–2009)
	Greg Craig	January 20, 2009	January 3, 2010	Barack Obama (2009–2017)
	Bob Bauer	January 3, 2010	June 30, 2011	Barack Obama (2009–2017)
	Kathy Ruemmler	June 30, 2011	June 2, 2014	Barack Obama (2009–2017)
	Neil Eggleston	June 2, 2014	January 20, 2017	Barack Obama (2009–2017)
	Don McGahn	January 20, 2017	October 17, 2018	Donald Trump (2017–2021)
	Emmet Flood; Acting	October 18, 2018	December 10, 2018	Donald Trump (2017–2021)
	Pat Cipollone	December 10, 2018	January 20, 2021	Donald Trump (2017–2021)
	Dana Remus	January 20, 2021	July 1, 2022	Joe Biden (2021–2025)
	Stuart Delery	July 1, 2022	September 11, 2023	Joe Biden (2021–2025)
	Ed Siskel	September 11, 2023	January 20, 2025	Joe Biden (2021–2025)
	David Warrington	January 20, 2025	September 1, 2026	Donald Trump (2025–present)
	Will Scharf	September 1, 2026	present	Donald Trump (2025–present)
