= Dana Remus =

American lawyer

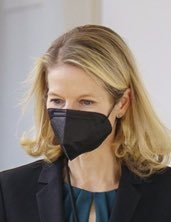
- Remus in 2022

White House Counsel
- In office January 20, 2021 – July 1, 2022
- President: Joe Biden
- Preceded by: Pat Cipollone
- Succeeded by: Stuart Delery

Personal details
- Born: 1974 or 1975 (age 51–52) New Hampshire, U.S.
- Party: Democratic
- Spouse(s): Michael J. Irwin (m. 2005, divorced) Brett M. Holmgren (m. 2018)
- Education: Harvard University (BA); Yale University (JD)

Dana Ann Remus (born 1974/1975) is an American lawyer who served as White House counsel for U.S. president Joe Biden from January 2021 to July 2022. Prior to her appointment as White House counsel, Remus was general counsel for Joe Biden's 2020 presidential campaign. Earlier in her career, she was deputy assistant to the president and deputy counsel for ethics during the presidency of Barack Obama, was general counsel for the Obama Foundation from 2017 to 2019, and was counsel to Michelle Obama.

== Early life and education ==
Dana Remus was born in New Hampshire and raised in the town of Bedford. She earned a Bachelor of Arts degree in East Asian studies from Harvard University in 1997 and a Juris Doctor from Yale Law School in 2002. While at Harvard, Remus rowed as senior heavyweight crew captain and tried out for the United States national women's rowing team.

== Career ==
After graduating from law school, Remus clerked for Judge Anthony Scirica of the United States Court of Appeals for the Third Circuit. She eventually joined Cravath, Swaine & Moore (2002–05). In 2006, she began her academic career as an inaugural faculty member at the newly established Drexel University College of Law (now Thomas R. Kline School of Law) (2006–08). In 2008, she clerked for Justice Samuel Alito of the Supreme Court of the United States. She then taught from 2009 to 2013 at the University of New Hampshire School of Law and property law and judicial and legal ethics at the University of North Carolina School of Law (2013–16).

Remus joined the Obama administration, serving in 2016 as Deputy Assistant to the President and Deputy Counsel for Ethics. After Obama left office, Remus joined the Obama Foundation (2017–20) as general counsel and also served as counsel to Michelle Obama. She left the Foundation in 2019 to become general counsel in 2020 for the Joe Biden 2020 presidential campaign.

=== Biden administration ===
Remus was named White House counsel on November 17, 2020. She left her position in July 2022 and was replaced by Stuart F. Delery.

Remus co-lead legal offensives on behalf of the Democratic Party against third-party candidates in the 2024 United States presidential election, alongside outside lawyer Robert D. Lenhard.

== Personal life ==
Dana Remus is married to Brett M. Holmgren, who served as the assistant secretary of state for intelligence and research in the Biden administration. The wedding took place on January 21, 2018, in Washington, D.C., with former president Barack Obama officiating. The couple have one son. Remus was previously married to Michael J. "Mike" Irwin, a rowing coach.

== See also ==
- List of law clerks for the eighth seat of the Supreme Court of the United States

Legal offices
Preceded by Pat Cipollone	White House Counsel; 2021–2022	Succeeded by Stuart Delery
