= Michele Norris =

American journalist (born 1961)

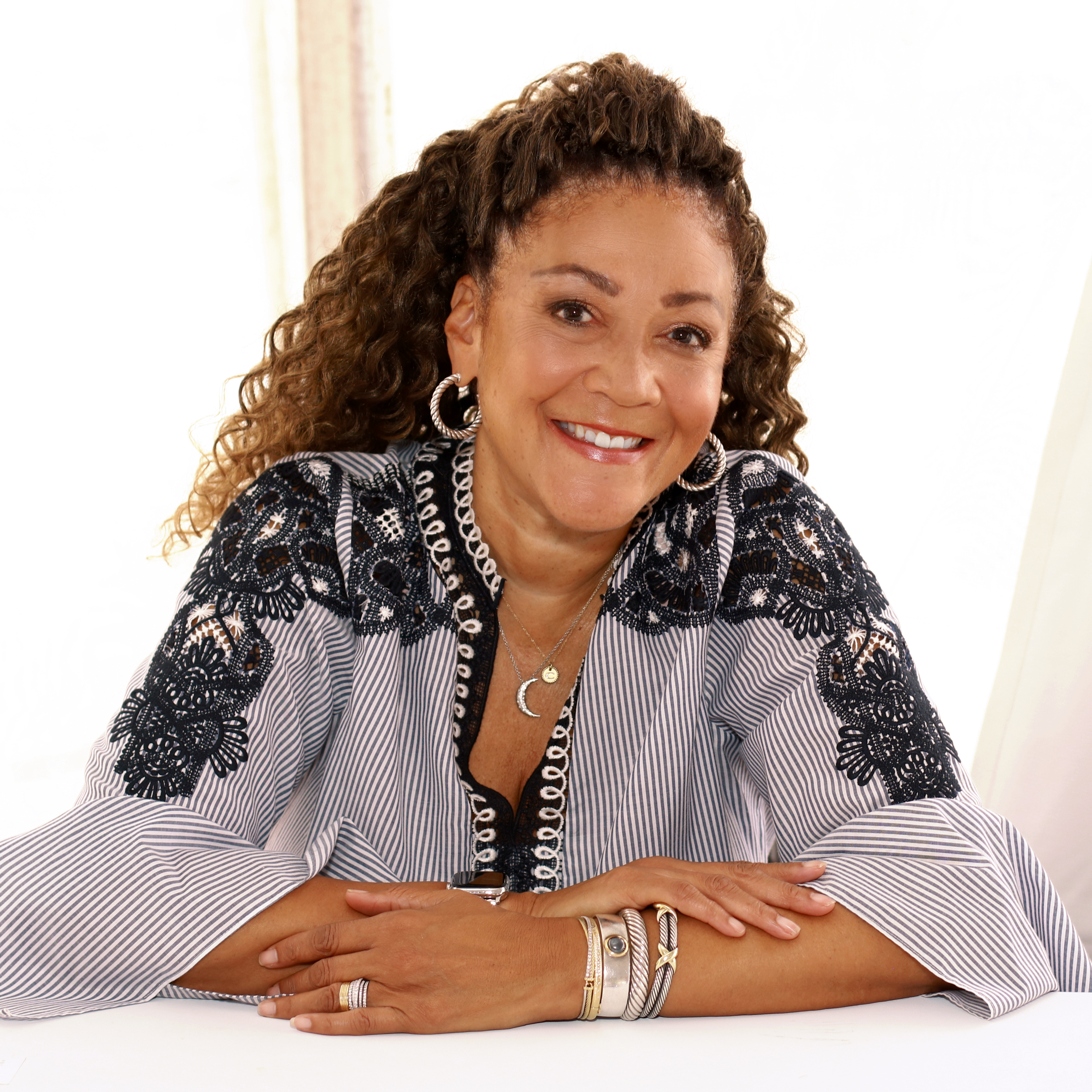
- Norris at the 2024 Texas Book Festival
- Born: Michele Lisa Norris; September 7, 1961 (age 65); Hennepin County, Minnesota, U.S.
- Education: University of Wisconsin-Madison; University of Minnesota (BA)
- Occupation: Journalist
- Notable credit(s): The Washington Post; All Things Considered; ABC News; The Chicago Tribune; The Los Angeles Times; MS NOW
- Spouse: Broderick D. Johnson (m. 1993)

Michele L. Norris (/ˈmiːʃɛl/ MEE-shel; born September 7, 1961) is an American journalist. From 2019 to 2024 Norris was an opinion columnist with The Washington Post. She co-hosted National Public Radio's evening news program All Things Considered from 2002 to 2011 and was the first African-American female host for NPR. Before that Norris was a correspondent for ABC News, the Chicago Tribune, and the Los Angeles Times. Norris is a member of the Peabody Awards board of directors. Having resigned from The Washington Post after the paper's refusal to endorse a presidential candidate in the 2024 United States presidential election, Norris is now a senior contributing editor at MS NOW.

== Early life ==
Norris was born in Hennepin County, Minnesota, to Elizabeth Jean "Betty" and Belvin Norris Jr. Her mother is a fourth-generation Minnesotan and her father is from Alabama. Belvin served in the Navy in World War II. Norris attended Washburn High School in Minneapolis, and later the University of Wisconsin–Madison, where she first studied electrical engineering, before transferring to the University of Minnesota where she majored in journalism and mass communications.

== Career ==
At the University of Minnesota, Norris wrote for the Minnesota Daily and then became a reporter for WCCO-TV.

Norris wrote for The Washington Post, the Chicago Tribune, and the Los Angeles Times. In 1990, while at The Washington Post, Norris received the Livingston Award for articles she wrote about the life of a six-year-old boy who lived with a crack-addicted mother in a crack house.

From 1993 to 2002, Norris was a news correspondent for ABC News, winning an Emmy Award and a Peabody Award for coverage of the September 11 attacks.

=== NPR ===
Norris joined the NPR evening news program All Things Considered on December 9, 2002, becoming the first African-American female host for NPR. In 2015, Fortune described Norris as "one of [NPR's] biggest stars".

Norris's coverage of Hurricane Katrina and its aftermath won acclaim early in her time at NPR. She moderated a Democratic presidential debate in Iowa, alongside Steve Inskeep and Robert Siegel. In 2008, Norris teamed with Morning Edition host Steve Inskeep for The York Project: Race & The '08 Vote. Inskeep and Norris share an Alfred I. duPont–Columbia University Award silver baton award. While at NPR, Norris interviewed a range of politicians and celebrities, including President Barack Obama, Susan Rice, Quincy Jones, and Joan Rivers among others.

Norris announced on October 24, 2011, that she would temporarily step down from her All Things Considered hosting duties and refrain from involvement in any NPR political coverage during the 2012 election year because of her husband's appointment to the Barack Obama 2012 presidential reelection campaign. On January 3, 2013, NPR announced that Norris had stepped down as a regular host of All Things Considered and would instead serve as an occasional host and special correspondent.

==== The Race Card Project ====
The Race Card Project, begun by Norris in 2010 while she was at NPR, invited people to submit comments on their experience of race in the United States in six words. Norris and collaborators won a 2014 Peabody Award for the project.

In December 2015, Norris left NPR to focus on the Race Card Project. In July 2020, Simon & Schuster announced a book deal for the project, which would include a related children's book. That book--Our Hidden Conversation What Americans Really Think About Race and Identity--was released in January 2024, and is based on Norris's collection of hundreds of thousands of hidden conversations for The Race Card Project archive.

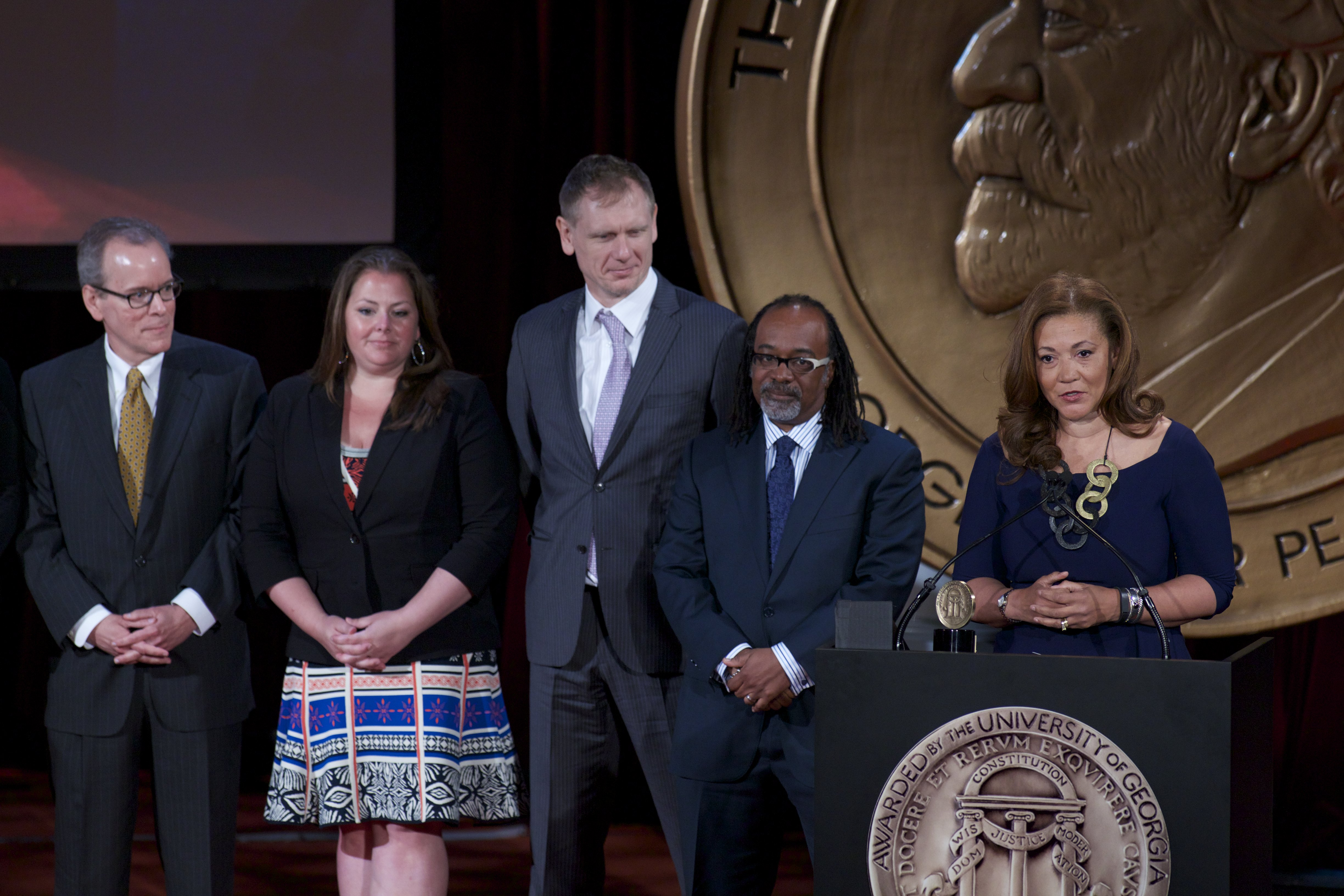
Norris, with Chuck Holmes, Melissa Bear, Adrian Kinloch, and Walter Ray Watson, accepts the Peabody Award for "The Race Card Project".

=== The Grace of Silence ===
Norris is also the author of The Grace of Silence, a memoir and reported non-fiction book that started as an extension of the Race Card Project. In the book Norris writes of discovering her father's shooting by a Birmingham, Alabama police officer and also her maternal grandmother's job as a traveling Aunt Jemima, promoting the eponymous breakfast brand.

=== Podcast ===
Norris is host of the interview podcast Your Mama's Kitchen, which started in 2023 with Higher Ground Audio.

=== Awards ===
- 2006 -- Emmy Award for ABC News coverage of the September 11 attacks
- 2006 -- Peabody Award for ABC News coverage of the September 11 attacks
- 2009 -- Journalist of the Year, National Association of Black Journalists (NABJ), citing Norris's coverage of the 2008 U.S. presidential election
- 2013 -- Honorary Doctorate of Humane Letters, University of Michigan
- 2014 -- Peabody Award for Norris's NPR series The Race Card Project
- 2022 -- Goldsmith Career Award, Shorenstein Center for Media, Politics and Public Policy, Harvard Kennedy School.

== Personal life ==
Norris lives in the District of Columbia with her husband, Broderick D. Johnson, the former White House Cabinet Secretary for President Barack Obama, and her daughter, son, and stepson.
