= Kanzeon Zen Center =

Former Zen Buddhist center in Salt Lake City, Utah

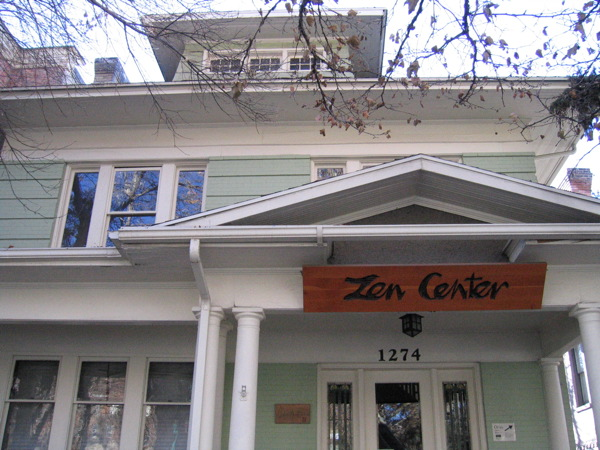
- The former Kanzeon Zen Center on East South Temple
- Formation: 1993
- Founder: Dennis Merzel
- Type: Zen Buddhist center
- Legal status: Closed circa 2011
- Headquarters: Salt Lake City, Utah, United States
- Location: 1274 East South Temple

Kanzeon Zen Center was a Zen Buddhist practice center in Salt Lake City, Utah. Established by American Zen teacher Dennis Merzel, also known as Genpo Roshi. It served as the headquarters of his international Kanzeon Sangha.

The Salt Lake City center operated from adjoining properties on East South Temple. It ceased operating as a local center following a leadership and financial crisis in 2011 involving Merzel. The South Temple buildings were offered for sale, while the broader Kanzeon Sangha and Merzel's Big Mind organization continued after the local center ceased operating.

== History ==
=== Origins and establishment in Utah ===
Merzel received Dharma transmission from Taizan Maezumi in 1980. He founded the Kanzeon International Sangha in 1982. His international sangha grew to include thousands of members across the United States and several European countries, including Poland, France, Belgium, the Netherlands, Germany, England, and Malta. In 1988, he established and became the leader of Hosshinji Temple in Bar Harbor, Maine. After Hosshinji closed in 1991, due to a scandal after Merzel had sexual relations with students, Merzel relocated briefly to Oregon.

In 1993, Merzel was invited by the Wasatch Zen Group to move to Salt Lake City, where he established the Kanzeon Zen Center. It also served as the headquarters of his international sangha. It operated at 1274 East South Temple. Sources later gave its address as either 1274 or 1268 East South Temple, reflecting the center's use of adjoining properties.

=== Practice and community ===
During the 1990s and 2000s, Kanzeon developed into a substantial Zen practice and training center offering regular zazen, introductory meditation instruction, classes, retreats, private interviews with teachers, koan study, and preparation for Buddhist ordination. Merzel served as its abbot and principal teacher, while other senior practitioners also taught at the center. In 2004, its regular schedule included morning meditation, classes on Monday and Thursday evenings, and Sunday-morning practice.

The South Temple center included an upstairs meditation hall and an ancestors' room containing some of Taizan Maezumi's cremated remains. A 2004 newspaper profile described a morning period in which practitioners meditated while Daniel Doen Silberberg conducted individual koan interviews; a later class that same day was taught by Merzel and had approximately 20 participants. The Deseret News reported that it was better known in Europe than locally and attracted practitioners from around the world, some of whom moved to Utah to study with Merzel.

Among the practitioners and teachers associated with Kanzeon were former Utah Supreme Court chief justice Michael David Zimmerman, Diane Musho Hamilton, Daniel Doen Silberberg, Richard Taido Christofferson, and Mark Kanchi Esterman. Kanzeon also participated in interfaith activities in Utah and hosted events involving members of other Buddhist communities.

=== Big Mind ===
In 1999, Merzel developed the Big Mind process, combining Zen teachings and meditation with techniques derived from the psychological practice known as Voice Dialogue. Big Mind became an increasingly prominent and financially significant part of his work during the following decade. Merzel presented it as a method of making the central insights of Zen accessible to a wider Western audience.

By 2011, The Salt Lake Tribune reported that Big Mind had grossed millions of dollars in recent years through workshops and intensive training programs. According to the newspaper, several dozen participants around the world had paid $50,000 for five days of small-group instruction with Merzel, while other programs at his Utah cabin and a Big Mind facility on Maui carried suggested donations of $10,000 or $15,000 per participant. Merzel also taught Big Mind in corporate settings.

Big Mind operated through a nonprofit organization separate from Kanzeon. Merzel stated that income from Big Mind had financially supported Kanzeon's traditional Zen programs for several years, creating a close financial and organizational relationship between the two operations.

== 2011 leadership crisis and closure ==
At a meeting in the Netherlands, in January 2011, Merzel acknowledged that he had engaged in a sexual relationship with an advanced student. In February, he announced plans to disrobe as a Buddhist priest, stop giving Buddhist precepts and ordinations, resign as an elder of the White Plum Asanga, and step away from leadership at Kanzeon in Salt Lake City. A group of 44 Zen teachers issued a public letter calling for him to stop teaching, and the center appointed Richard Taido Christofferson to oversee its teaching, training and administration.

After Merzel resumed teaching in April, The Salt Lake Tribune reported that 66 Zen teachers issued an open letter criticizing his return. The newspaper also reported that the East South Temple buildings were for sale and that disagreements over Merzel's continued role had divided the community.

=== Merzel and Kanzeon after the Salt Lake City zen center ===
After the Salt Lake City center closed, Merzel continued teaching through the Kanzeon Sangha and Big Mind and offering programs in the United States, Europe, and online. Kanzeon, Inc.'s website subsequently identified Merzel as abbot of the Kanzeon Big Mind Sangha and head of the Kanzeon Sangha. Merzel's later official biography states that he left the Salt Lake City Zen center following the scandal.

== Legacy and successor communities ==
Zen practice in Salt Lake City continued through organizations founded by teachers and students who had been associated with Kanzeon. Hamilton and Zimmerman began developing an independent practice community known as Two Arrows Zen. According to the organization's history, they opened their Artspace Zendo in downtown Salt Lake City by the end of February 2011. Mark Kanchi Esterman, another former Kanzeon practitioner and teacher, founded the Salt Lake Zen Group in 2012. The group maintained a relationship with Merzel and the international Kanzeon Sangha.

The legacy of the Salt Lake center extended beyond Utah as well. Anton Tenkei Coppens received dharma transmission from Merzel in 1996 and assisted him for four years. Myoho Gabrysch lived for twelve years in Merzel’s communities in Maine and Utah. The two later established Zen River Temple in the Netherlands which continues to operate as of 2026.

== Gallery ==
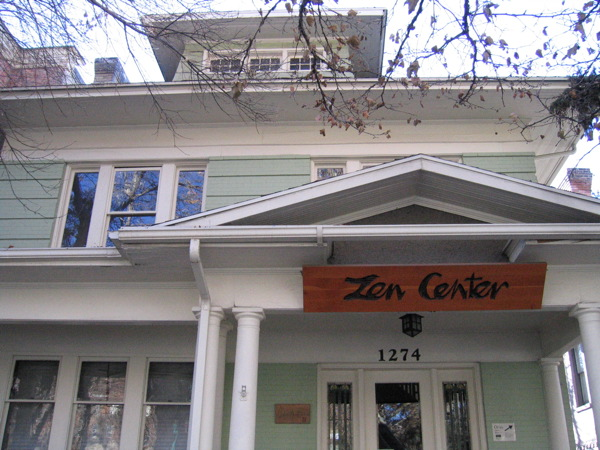
Exterior of the former center on East South Temple

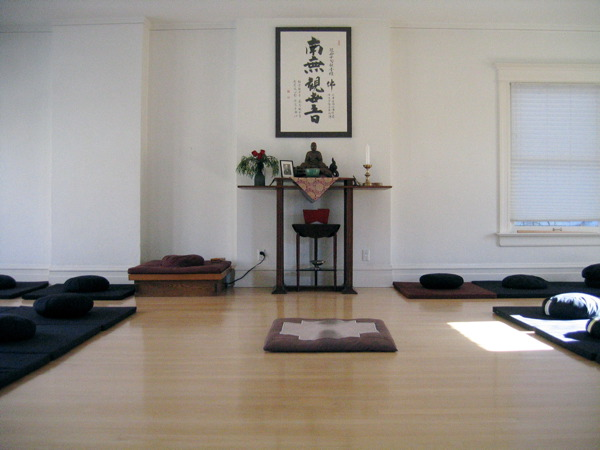
The center's main meditation hall

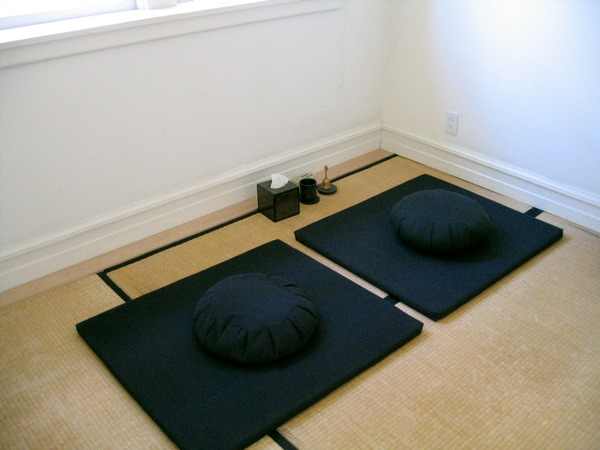
The room used for private teacher–student interviews

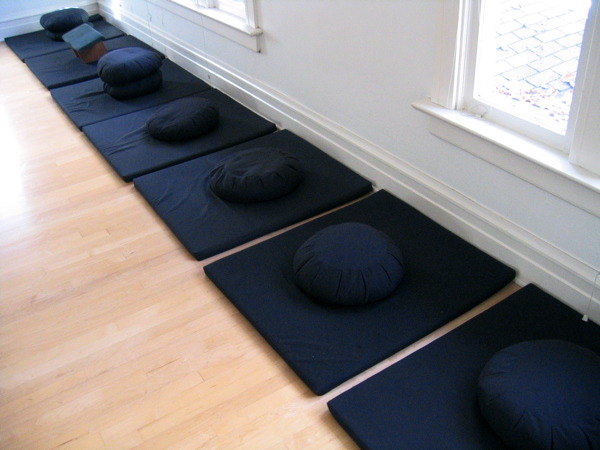
Meditation cushions in the zendo

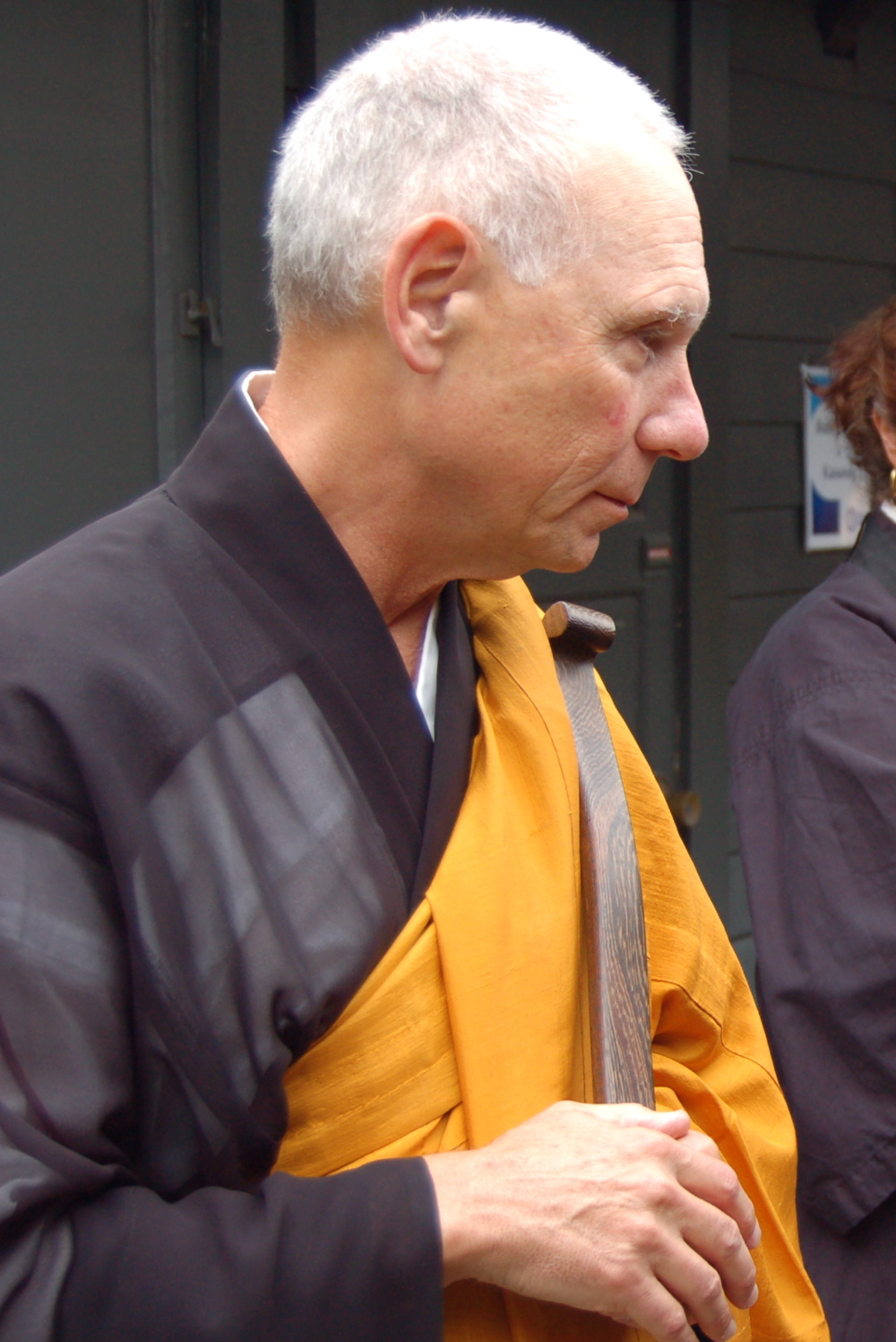
Dennis Genpo Merzel, founder and abbot of the center

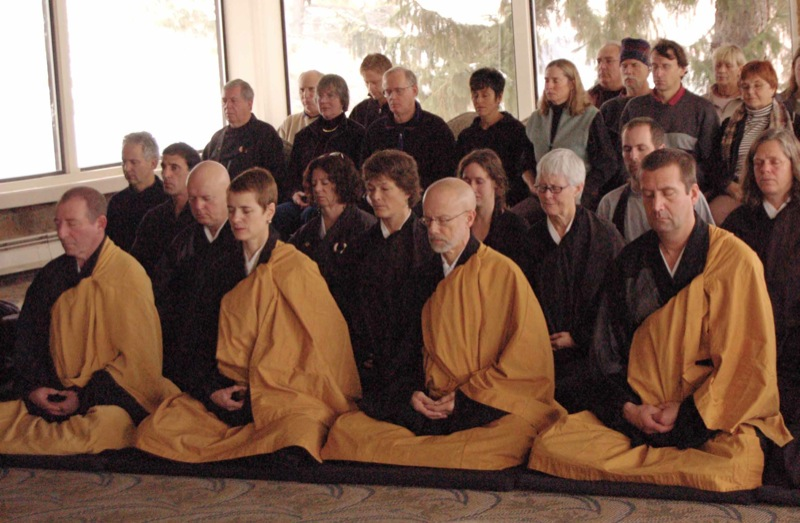
Teachers associated with Kanzeon

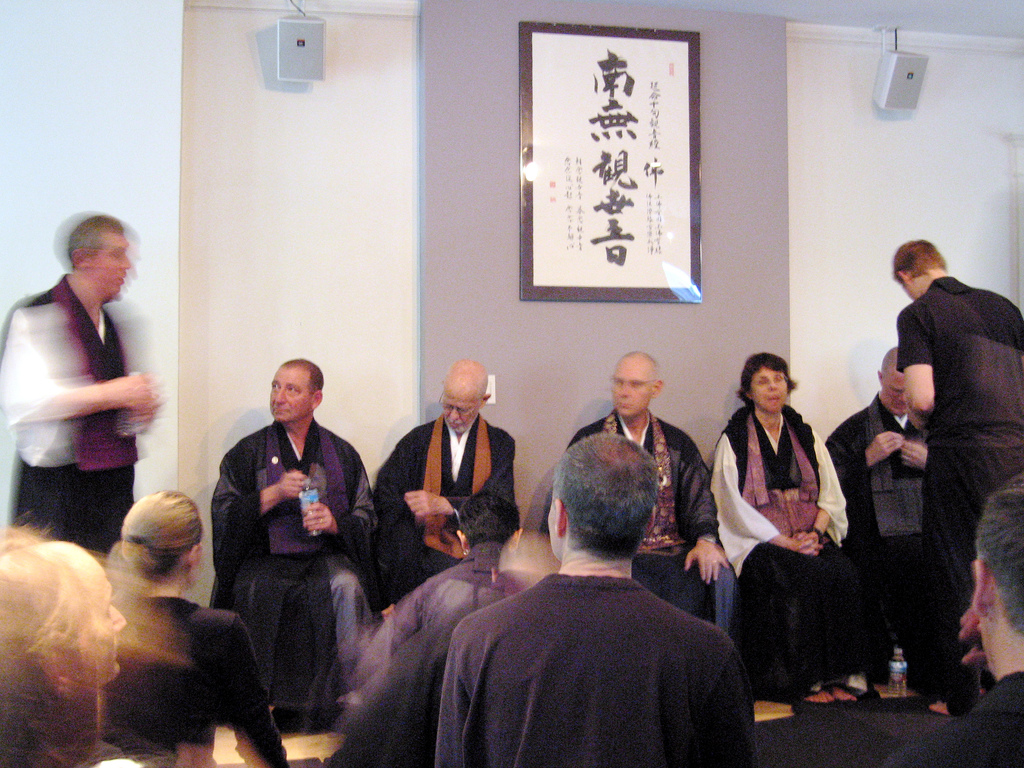
Kanzeon teachers and members
