= Sheila Nix =

American political strategist

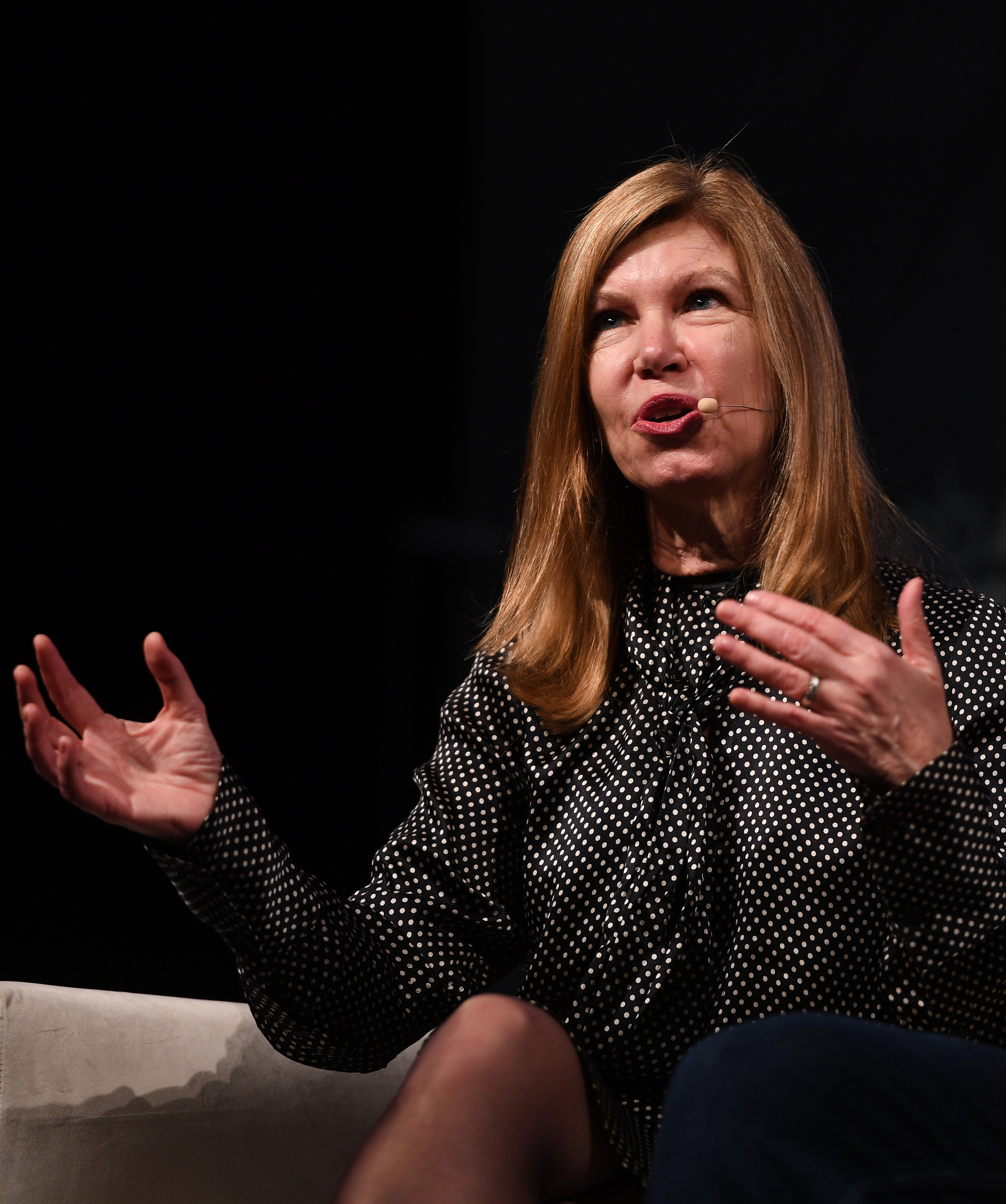

Chief of Staff to the Second Lady of the United States
- In office April 2013 – January 2017
- Vice President: Joe Biden
- Second Lady: Jill Biden
- Succeeded by: Kristan King Nevins

Personal details
- Party: Democratic
- Children: 3
- Education: Creighton University (BSBA); University of Chicago (JD)

Sheila Nix is an American attorney and political strategist who served as Chief of Staff to Jill Biden, the Second Lady of the United States from April 2013 to January 2017.

== Early life and education ==
Nix was raised in Portage Park, Chicago and Palatine, Illinois. She earned a Bachelor of Science in Business Administration degree in accounting from Creighton University and J.D. degree from the University of Chicago Law School.

== Career ==
Nix was an associate at Arnold & Porter LLP from 1989 to 1991. From 1992 to 1999, Nix worked for Senator Bob Kerrey, holding positions as Chief of Staff and Legislative Director. As legislative director, she focused on developing policy for the Senator, especially on healthcare issues. She also served as the Budget Director at the Democratic Senatorial Campaign Committee. Prior to that, she worked on Bob Kerrey's presidential campaign in 1991 and 1992.

From 2004 to 2008, she was one of two deputy governors in the administration of Governor Rod Blagojevich of Illinois, but departed before he was accused and then convicted of trying to sell then President-elect Barack Obama's senate seat.

Nix had served as chief of staff to U.S. Senator Bill Nelson, where she was responsible for setting up his Washington, D.C. and Florida operations and managing a staff of fifty. Senator Nelson served on the Foreign Relations, Armed Services, Budget and Commerce Committees. She was also policy director and chief of staff in Blair Hull’s Democratic primary campaign against the then-Senator Barack Obama.

She previously served as campaign Chief of Staff to Vice President Biden. She was based in Chicago at the Obama for America headquarters for the 2012 presidential campaign. From 2009 to 2012, she was executive director of Bono's The ONE Campaign, a global advocacy and campaigning organization that fights extreme poverty and preventable disease, particularly in Africa, by raising public awareness and working with political leaders to support effective policies and programs that save lives. She was responsible for ONE's advocacy, communications, and campaign activities in the United States.

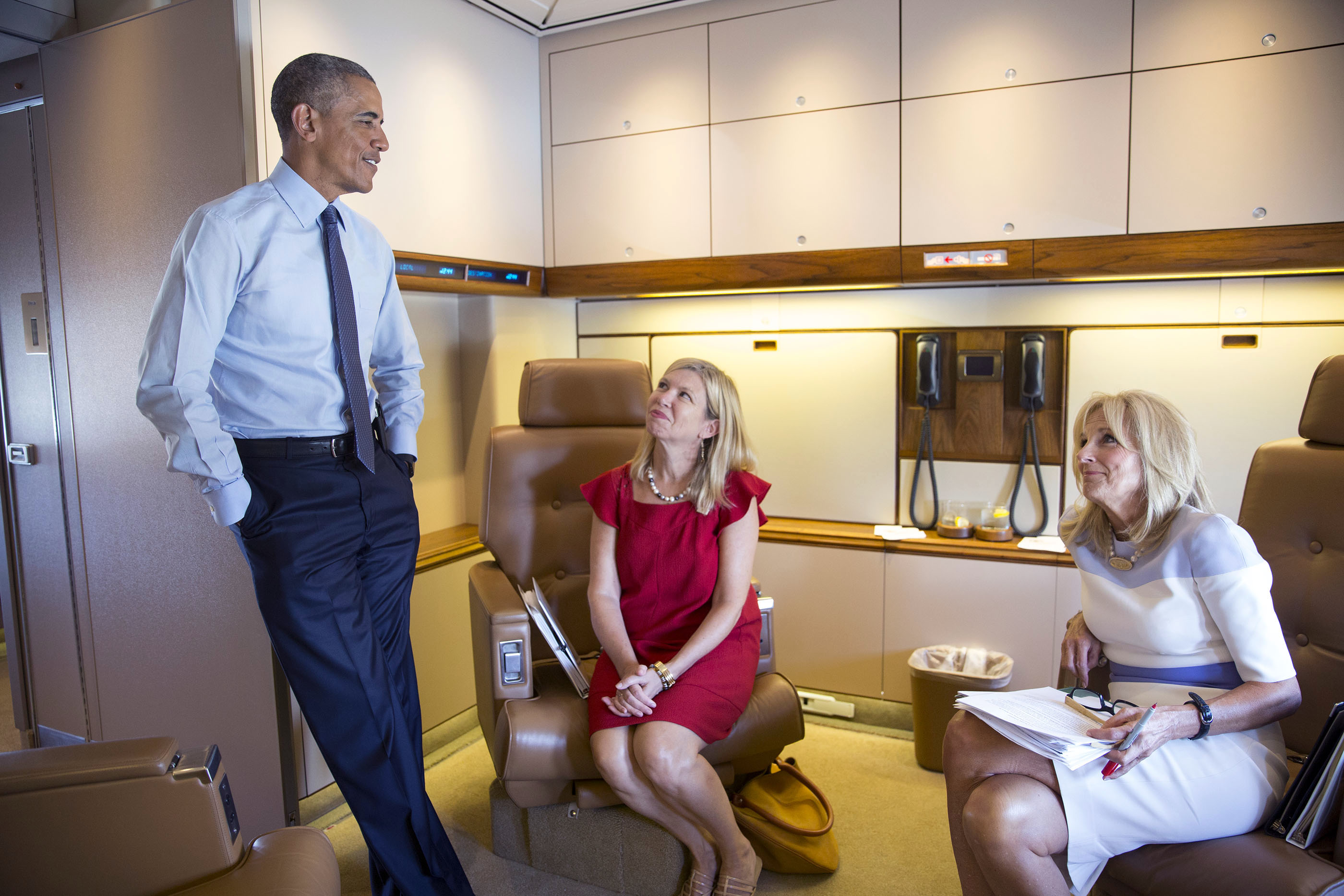
Sheila Nix with President Obama and Jill Biden.

In 2019, Nix became an advisor on the Joe Biden 2020 presidential campaign. In August 2020, it was announced that Nix would serve as a senior advisor for vice-presidential nominee Kamala Harris.

Since 2021, Nix has acted as the chief of staff to Secretary of Education Miguel Cardona.

In 2023, it was announced that Nix would serve as campaign Chief of Staff to Vice President Harris for the 2024 campaign. She would likely be touring swing states to highlight reproductive rights and gun safety initiatives.

== Personal life ==
Nix and her husband, an attorney, have three children. After the end of the Obama administration, Nix and her family returned to Illinois.
