= Taylor Budowich =

American political consultant (born 1989)

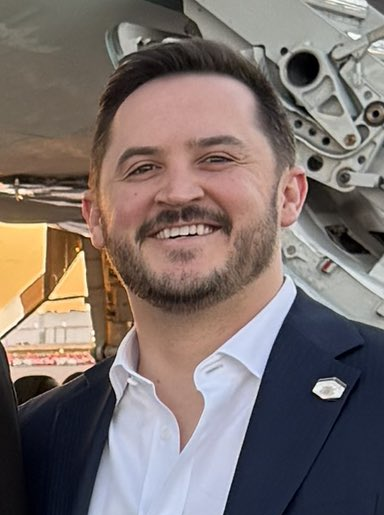
- Budowich in 2025

White House Deputy Chief of Staff for Communications and Personnel
- In office January 20, 2025 – September 26, 2025
- President: Donald Trump
- Chief of Staff: Susie Wiles
- Preceded by: Dan Scavino (Note: As Deputy Chief of Staff for Communications.)

White House Cabinet Secretary
- In office January 20, 2025 – September 30, 2025
- President: Donald Trump
- Preceded by: Evan Ryan
- Succeeded by: Meghan Bauer

Personal details
- Born: Taylor Anthony Budowich; November 3, 1989 (age 37) Sacramento, California, U.S.
- Party: Republican
- Education: American University in Cairo (attended)

Taylor Anthony Budowich (born November 3, 1989) is an American political consultant who served as the White House deputy chief of staff for communications and personnel and the White House cabinet secretary from January to September 2025.

Budowich attended the American University in Cairo, but evacuated during the 2011 Egyptian revolution. He interned for California representative Doris Matsui and Sacramento mayor Heather Fargo, and later joined Tea Party Express, an organization established to support the Tea Party movement. Budowich had become the organization's spokesperson by the following year, its communication director the year after that, and its executive director by 2014. He led the organization's national bus tours and organized rallies in support of amenable senators and representatives. In September 2017, Budowich began working for Watchdog PAC, a political action committee for Richard Corcoran, the speaker of the Florida House of Representatives. He later worked for Ron DeSantis's campaign in the 2018 Florida gubernatorial election and served as DeSantis's deputy policy director for education.

Budowich served as a spokesperson for Donald Trump's 2020 presidential campaign. After Trump's loss in that year's presidential election, he began advising political campaigns. In 2022, Budowich began working as a spokesperson for Save America, a political action committee in support of Trump, and was named as the executive director of MAGA Inc., a political action committee with the same goal. In August 2024, he was hired by Trump's 2024 presidential campaign. In November, Trump named Budowich as his deputy chief of staff for communications and personnel. In September 2025, he resigned to work for the private sector.

== Early life and education (1989–2011) ==
Taylor Anthony Budowich was born on November 3, 1989, in Sacramento, California, United States. Budowich was born with a diaphragmatic hernia and immediately had two surgeries. He was the first child of Kirk and Jeannine Budowich. (Note: Kirk and Jeannine had one child after Taylor: Paige (born 1991/1992).) Kirk was a washer and dryer repairman, while Jeannine was a bookkeeper and administrator. By October 1999, the Budowiches were living in North Sacramento. Budowich attended St. Philomene School, a Catholic school, and volunteered for Jesuit High School as an equipment manager. He participated in taekwondo; after winning a Nintendo video game console for bringing in new students to his karate program, Budowich donated the system to Ronald McDonald House Charities. Kirk died when Budowich was 17. Budowich attended El Camino Fundamental High School in Arden-Arcade and later the American University in Cairo. He was forced to evacuate during the 2011 Egyptian revolution.

== Career ==
=== Early political work (2011–2021) ===
By 2011, Budowich had interned for California representative Doris Matsui and Sacramento mayor Heather Fargo. After returning to Sacramento, he contacted Sal Russo, a Republican political consultant. Budowich joined Russo's organization, Tea Party Express, established to support the Tea Party movement, that year. By August 2012, he represented Tea Party Express as a spokesperson. Budowich had become the organization's communications director by December 2013 and its executive director by June 2014. From 2012 to 2016, he handled Tea Party Express's response to President Barack Obama's State of the Union addresses. Budowich led the organization's national bus tours and organized rallies in support of amenable senators, including Marco Rubio and Ted Cruz, and representatives, including Ted Yoho and Ron DeSantis.

In September 2017, Budowich began working for Watchdog PAC, a political action committee for Richard Corcoran, the speaker of the Florida House of Representatives. Florida Politics viewed Budowich's appointment as the greatest indicator that Corcoran would run for governor of Florida in the 2018 gubernatorial election. Budowich served as the committee's communications director by January 2018. After DeSantis announced his candidacy, Corcoran's prospects diminished; Budowich worked for DeSantis's gubernatorial campaign and later temporarily served as his deputy policy director for education. He worked with DeSantis to dismantle Common Core. Budowich served as a spokesperson for Donald Trump's 2020 presidential campaign and was a close advisor to Donald Trump Jr., according to ProPublica. He helped lead Trump Jr.'s political action committee, Save the U.S. Senate PAC, following that year's presidential election, ahead of the Georgia runoff election.

=== Post-government activities (2021–2024) ===
By June 2021, Budowich had become a senior advisor to Max Miller, a Trump aide running for Ohio's 7th congressional district in the 2022 U.S. House of Representatives election. The following month, he joined the conservative commentator Tudor Dixon's campaign in the 2022 Michigan gubernatorial election. Budowich became the director of communications for Save America, Trump's political action committee, later that month. In November, the House Select Committee to Investigate the January 6th Attack on the United States Capitol subpoenaed Budowich, who allegedly led a social media campaign to garner attendees for a rally in the Ellipse that preceded the January 6 Capitol attack. In February 2022, he appeared before the committee in a four-hour sworn testimony and gave the committee 1,700 pages of documents. Among the documents included his financial records from JPMorgan Chase; a federal judge rejected Budowich's emergency request to force the committee to relinquish the records.

Budowich served as Trump's spokesperson through Save America. With Donald Trump Jr., he founded a news aggregation app. In September 2022, Trump allies—supported by the then-former president—announced a political action committee, MAGA Inc., and named Budowich as its executive director. Budowich was not retained as Trump's spokesman after Trump announced his presidential campaign for the 2024 election in November 2022. His work with MAGA Inc. legally barred him from interacting with Trump.

In June 2023, one day before Trump was criminally charged in the classified documents case, Budowich appeared before the federal grand jury that indicted Trump. The following year, he wrote a memo viewing Pennsylvania as a critical state for the Trump campaign and stated that MAGA Inc. would use its resources to divert African American and Hispanic and Latino American voters. Budowich's work focused on advertising in Pennsylvania, Georgia, Nevada, and Arizona. Budowich ran the pro-Trump non-profit group Securing American Greatness. In August, he co-founded an effort for the Trump campaign to reach young men. That month, Budowich left MAGA Inc. to work for Trump's campaign.

== White House Deputy Chief of Staff (January–September 2025) ==
In November 2024, The Washington Post reported that Budowich was expected to be named as a White House deputy chief of staff. On November 13, 2024, Trump announced that Budowich would serve as assistant to the president and deputy chief of staff for communications and personnel. Susie Wiles, the incoming chief of staff, tentatively established a staff structure in which the Presidential Personnel Office would serve beneath the Office of Cabinet Affairs, set to be led by Budowich. Prior to Trump's second inauguration, Budowich was among several aides who assisted in Trump's inaugural speech. According to Regime Change, Budowich convinced Trump not to refer to participants of the January 6 Capitol attack as "hostages".

Budowich additionally served as the White House cabinet secretary. In February 2025, Budowich moved to block Associated Press journalists from the Oval Office and Air Force One, among other locations, over the news agency's stance on the Gulf of Mexico naming controversy. He was named in Associated Press v. Budowich (2025), a lawsuit filed by the Associated Press over the move. In September, Axios reported that Budowich intended to resign to work for the private sector by the end of that month; he had left by October 1. Budowich's responsibilities were partially assumed by Karoline Leavitt, the White House press secretary, and Steven Cheung, the White House communications director.

In October 2026, The New Republic published an article implicating Budowich in the coordinated effort to suppress the release of the Epstein Files.

== Post-government work (2025–present) ==
In March 2026, it was reported that Budowich had begun leading the Innovation Council Action, an organization advocating for deregulation in the artificial intelligence sector. He additionally founded The Sovereign Advisors, a lobbying firm.

== Works cited ==
=== Articles ===
- Bade, Rachael; Lizza, Ryan; Palmeri, Tara; Daniels, Eugene (July 29, 2021). "McConnell's Herschel Walker problem". Politico.
- Bender, Michael; Haberman, Maggie (November 15, 2022). "Trump Announces 2024 Run, Repeating Lies and Exaggerating Record". The New York Times.
- Broadwater, Luke (November 22, 2021). "House Panel Subpoenas Roger Stone and Alex Jones in Capitol Riot Inquiry". The New York Times.
- Budowich, Taylor (December 20, 2013). "Daines builds conservative credentials". The Billings Gazette.
- Cadelago, Christopher; McGraw, Meridith; Isenstadt, Alex (November 15, 2022). "Unbowed by midterms fiasco, Trump tries for president again". Politico.
- Dixon, Matt (January 26, 2018). "Corcoran's committee drops $95K for first TV ad buy". Politico.
- Dawsey, Josh (November 12, 2024). "Donald Trump is expected to announce that James Blair, Taylor Budowich, Dan Scavino and Stephen Miller are all going to be deputy chiefs of staff, per people familiar with the plan who spoke on the condition on anonymity to share personnel decisions that haven't been announced publicly". The Washington Post.
- Feuer, Alan; Haberman, Maggie; Rashbaum, William; Thrush, Glenn (June 7, 2023). "Prosecutors Tell Trump's Legal Team He Is a Target of Investigation". The New York Times.
- Fischer, Sara (March 22, 2022). "Donald Trump Jr. launches news aggregation app". Axios.
- Gold, Hadas (June 25, 2014). "Talk radio: McDaniel's not our fault". Politico.
- Goldmacher, Shane (December 5, 2024). "How Trump Targeted Undecided Voters Without Breaking the Bank". The New York Times.
- Haberman, Maggie; Swan, Jonathan (June 5, 2024). "Trump Super PAC Says It Took In Nearly $70 Million in May". The New York Times.
- Haberman, Maggie; Swan, Jonathan (November 13, 2024). "Trump Plans to Install His Book Publisher as Head of Personnel". The New York Times. Archived from the original on January 16, 2025.
- Irwin, Lauren (February 19, 2025). "Allies troll critics with references to King Trump". The Hill.
- Isenstadt, Alex (November 30, 2020). "Donald Trump Jr. aides launch super PAC as Georgia worries mount". Politico.
- Isenstadt, Alex (September 23, 2022). "Trump to unleash millions in the midterms in possible prelude to 2024". Politico.
- Isenstadt, Alex (August 12, 2024). "Pro-Trump super PAC plans $100M ad blitz". Politico.
- Isenstadt, Alex (May 31, 2024b). "There's a new dark money group supporting Trump". POLITICO.
- Isenstadt, Alex (September 24, 2025). "Longtime Trump adviser Budowich departing White House". Axios.
- Isenstadt, Alex (March 29, 2026). "New pro-AI group preps $100M midterm blitz to boost Trump's agenda". Axios.
- Jacobs, Jennifer (October 1, 2025). "Trump's press secretary Karoline Leavitt retakes prime West Wing office space". CBS News.
- Korte, Lara (February 16, 2022). "A Sacramento kid grew up to be a voice for Donald Trump. Now he's fighting Jan. 6 subpoenas". The Sacramento Bee. Archived from the original on February 20, 2025.
- Leary, Alex (August 1, 2024). "Trump Allies Launch $20 Million Effort to Reach Young Men". The Wall Street Journal.
- Levinthal, Dave (August 31, 2012). "Groups oppose 'Barak' Obama". Politico.
- Lizza, Ryan; Palmeri, Tara; Daniels, Eugene; Bade, Rachael (July 2, 2021). "What do Tucker Carlson and J.D. Vance have in common?". Politico.
- McGraw, Meridith; Arkin, James (June 25, 2021). "Trump set to reemerge on the trail with revenge on his mind". Politico.
- McGraw, Meridith; Isenstadt, Alex; Bland, Scott (February 1, 2022). "How Trump's political groups are spending their huge cash haul". Politico.
- McGraw, Meridith (November 13, 2024). "Frontrunners emerge for Trump White House press secretary". Politico.
- "People". The Sacramento Bee. October 28, 1999.
- Robertson, Katie (February 14, 2025). "White House Will Continue to Bar Associated Press in Gulf of Mexico Fight". The New York Times.
- Robertson, Katie (February 21, 2025). "Associated Press Sues Trump Officials Over White House Ban". The New York Times.
- Sapien, Joaquin; Kaplan, Joshua (October 18, 2021). "Top Trump Fundraiser Boasted of Raising $3 Million to Support Jan. 6 "Save America" Rally". ProPublica.
- Schmidt, Michael; Broadwater, Luke (February 5, 2022). "In Scrutinizing Trump and His Allies, Jan. 6 Panel Adopts Prosecution Tactics". The New York Times.
- Schorsch, Peter (September 8, 2017). "Richard Corcoran committee hires Taylor Budowich". Florida Politics.
- Schorsch, Peter (October 25, 2017). "With website, social media, all signs point to Richard Corcoran running for governor". Florida Politics.
- Walker, Josephine (April 14, 2026). "Exclusive: "Just tell him the truth": An ex-aide's advice for talking to Trump". Axios. Archived from the original on June 12, 2026.

=== Books ===
- Haberman, Maggie; Swan, Jonathan (2026). Regime Change: Inside the Imperial Presidency of Donald Trump. New York: Simon & Schuster. ISBN 978-1-6680-6724-6.

=== Documents ===
- "Deposition of Taylor Budowich" (Document). United States House Select Committee on the January 6 Attack. December 22, 2021.

Political offices
Preceded by Evan Ryan	White House Cabinet Secretary; 2025	Succeeded by Meghan Bauer
