= Wang Renyuan =

Wang Renyuan (Chinese: 王任遠; 2 November 1910 – 24 June 1996) was a Chinese-born politician affiliated with the Kuomintang. He served in the Second Sino-Japanese War and was elected to political office in 1946. After the government of the Republic of China relocated to Taiwan, Wang served as Minister of Justice from 1970 to 1976.

== Life and career ==
Wang studied law at Chaoyang University, then received further training as a member of the Central Training Corps and at the Institute of Revolutionary Practice. While based in Yuncheng during the Second Sino-Japanese War, he was captured. At the end of the war, he received the Order of Victory of Resistance against Aggression. In 1946, Wang was elected to the Constituent National Assembly. Two years later, Wang won election as a member of the Legislative Yuan representing Tianjin. In 1961, Wang began studying in Japan, where he earned a master's in political science from Meiji University. In 1970, he was named Minister of Justice. Wang's tenure as justice minister ended in June 1976, when he was appointed an adviser to President Yen Chia-kan.

Since Wang's military service, and throughout his time in Tianjin, he had been appointed to increasingly prestigious positions within the Kuomintang. In May 1978, he left the central government for his final party post. His death in 1996 was marked by a presidential decree issued by Lee Teng-hui.

Wang's grandson Chris Lu was born in the United States and worked for Barack Obama.
