= Bill McGinley =

American government official

White House Cabinet Secretary
- In office January 20, 2017 – July 19, 2019
- President: Donald Trump
- Preceded by: Broderick D. Johnson
- Succeeded by: Matthew Flynn (acting)

Personal details
- Party: Republican
- Education: University of California, Los Angeles (BA); California State University, Long Beach (MA); George Washington University (JD)

William McGinley is the former White House Cabinet secretary in the first administration of U.S. president Donald Trump. He is an American lawyer and a former partner at the law firm Jones Day where he represented federal office holders, candidates, and national organizations on campaign finance, ethics, and other political law matters. On December 4, 2024, Trump announced that McGinley would serve as counsel to the Department of Government Efficiency (DOGE) in his second administration.

== Biography ==
McGinley received his Bachelor of Arts degree in history from the University of California at Los Angeles and his Master of Arts degree in history from California State University at Long Beach. He received his Juris Doctor degree from George Washington University Law School in 1997.

Following law school, McGinley served as Deputy General Counsel to the Republican National Committee (RNC) and was counsel to the Standing Committee on Rules of the RNC. He also served as general counsel to the National Republican Senatorial Committee.

McGinley worked for the law firm Patton Boggs where he became a partner and co-chair of the Election Law Practice Group. Afterwards, he became a partner at Jones Day.

McGinley was counsel to the Convention Rules Committee of the 2012 Republican National Convention. During the convention he pushed the credentials committee to replace 10 Maine delegates for Ron Paul with 10 who supported Mitt Romney.

McGinley was hired by the Donald Trump presidential campaign in April 2016. He was expected to act as a campaign advisor during the delegate selection battles and on potential challenges to the credentials of 2016 Republican National Convention delegates.

After the election, McGinley was appointed White House Cabinet secretary and began work on January 20, 2017. He resigned in July 2019, and he subsequently joined the Vogel Group.

In March 2024, McGinley joined an RNC election integrity team headed by Christina Bobb, serving as outside counsel.

On November 12, 2024, McGinley was selected to serve as White House counsel to President Trump. On December 4, Trump announced that McGinley would instead serve as counsel to the Department of Government Efficiency (DOGE).

On January 23, 2025, McGinley departed from the Department of Government Efficiency and went back to private practice.

Political offices
| Preceded by Broderick D. Johnson | White House Cabinet Secretary; 2017–2019 | Succeeded by Matthew Flynn; Acting |
