= Chris Lu =

Taiwanese-American lawyer and political advisor (born 1966)

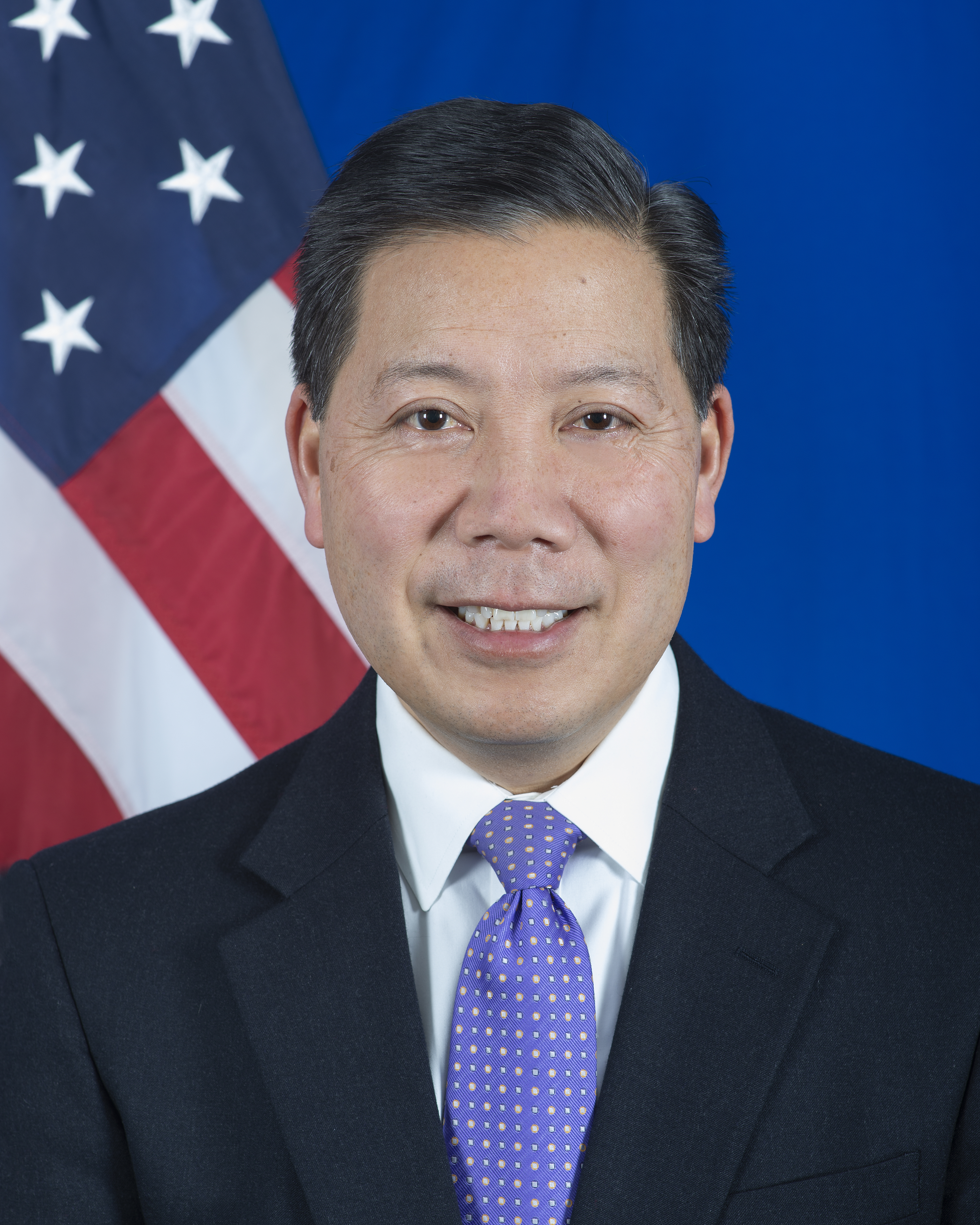
- Official portrait, 2022

United States Ambassador to the United Nations for Management and Reform
- In office January 4, 2022 – January 20, 2025
- President: Joe Biden
- Preceded by: Cherith Norman Chalet
- Succeeded by: Jeff Bartos

35th United States Deputy Secretary of Labor
- In office April 4, 2014 – January 20, 2017
- President: Barack Obama
- Preceded by: Seth Harris
- Succeeded by: Patrick Pizzella

17th White House Cabinet Secretary
- In office January 20, 2009 – January 25, 2013
- President: Barack Obama
- Preceded by: Ross M. Kyle
- Succeeded by: Danielle Gray

Personal details
- Born: June 12, 1966 (age 60) New Jersey, U.S.
- Party: Democratic
- Relations: Wang Renyuan (grandfather)
- Education: Princeton University (BA); Harvard University (JD)

Chinese name
- Traditional Chinese: 盧沛寧
- Simplified Chinese: 卢沛宁
Transcriptions
Standard Mandarin
- Hanyu Pinyin: Lú Pèiníng

Christopher P. Lu (Chinese: 盧沛寧; pinyin: Lú Pèiníng; born June 12, 1966) is a Taiwanese-American lawyer and political advisor who served as the U.S. ambassador to the United Nations for management and reform from 2022 to 2025. He was also an alternative representative to the United Nations General Assembly during his tenure as Representative for Management and Reform.

Born to Taiwanese American immigrants, Lu graduated from Princeton University and Harvard Law School, where he was a classmate of Barack Obama. In the Obama administration, he served as the United States Deputy Secretary of Labor from 2014 to 2017, the White House Cabinet Secretary and Assistant to the President from 2009 to 2013, and the co-chair of the White House Initiative on Asian Americans and Pacific Islanders.

After serving briefly as an advisor on Senator John Kerry's 2004 presidential campaign, Lu began working for Barack Obama in 2005 in his U.S. Senate office, where Lu served as legislative director and acting chief of staff. Following Obama's successful 2008 campaign for presidency, Lu was appointed executive director of the Obama-Biden Transition Project. When Obama appointed Lu as Cabinet Secretary, The New York Times described him as "one of the highest-ranking Asian Americans in the Obama administration". In 2018, Lu was elected as a fellow of the National Academy of Public Administration.

== Early life and education ==
Chris Lu was born on June 12, 1966, in New Jersey to a Taiwanese American family. Lu is the son of Eileen and Chien-Yang Lu, both of whom were born in mainland China and were Taiwanese waishengren. They lived in Taiwan until the 1950s, when they emigrated to the United States to attend college. Lu's grandfather, Wang Renyuan, was the Minister of Justice of Taiwan from 1970 to 1976 and was elected to the first Legislative Yuan in 1948 to represent Tianjin.

In 1974, Lu's family moved to the Fallsmead neighborhood of Rockville, Maryland, where he graduated from Thomas S. Wootton High School in 1984. Lu said he was heavily influenced by his father, who worked as an electrical engineer but loved literature and history; the two would read biographies of politicians and watch the evening news together.

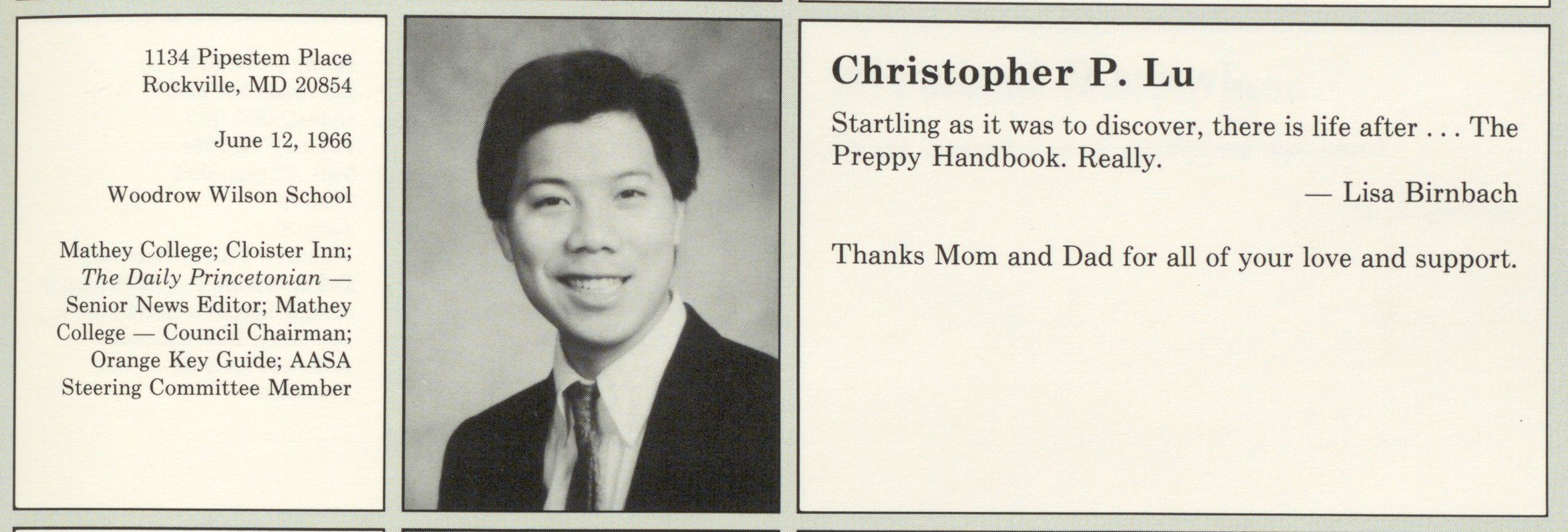
Lu in the Princeton University yearbook, 1988

Lu attended the Woodrow Wilson School of Public and International Affairs at Princeton University, where he was the senior news editor of the Daily Princetonian. Lu's ambition for a political career developed at Princeton, particularly during his internship in the Capitol Hill office of Senator Charles Mathias. He graduated magna cum laude in 1988, after writing a 161-page long senior thesis titled "Press Coverage of Presidential Primaries, 1972-1984." After graduating from Princeton, Lu attended Harvard Law School, where he was one of Barack Obama's classmates, from 1988 to 1991 and was elected the class marshall and served as an editor of the Harvard Journal on Legislation.

== Career ==
After graduating cum laude from Harvard in 1991 with his Juris Doctor (J.D.), Lu started his career as a law clerk to Judge Robert Cowen at the U.S. Court of Appeals for the Third Circuit. In 1992, he began working as a litigation attorney at the Washington, D.C., office of Sidley Austin, a large Chicago-based law firm. Barack Obama and his wife, Michelle, also worked at Sidley Austin, in the firm's Chicago office.

In 1997, Lu left Sidley Austin and took his first job in the political arena as deputy chief counsel for Representative Henry Waxman and the Democratic staff of the Oversight and Government Reform Committee of the House of Representatives. Phil Schiliro, Waxman's chief of staff, had a large part in the decision to hire Lu; the two would work together again later on the Obama administration; Lu later said he considers Schiliro and Pete Rouse, another future White House staffer, among his most influential mentors. During his tenure with the Government Reform Committee, Lu conducted several high-profile investigations, including investigations into campaign fundraising during the 1996 presidential election, the collapse of Enron, and substandard nursing home conditions. Lu also served as special adviser for communications to Senator John Kerry during the 2004 presidential election. One of his primary duties there was coordinating the activities of families of September 11 attack victims supporting the Kerry campaign.

=== Barack Obama's Senate office ===
After Barack Obama was elected as U.S. Senator of Illinois, Lu joined Obama's office in early 2005 as legislative director. Lu developed a strong admiration for Obama, of whom he said, "With his quick and incisive mind, Obama is the most intelligent person that I have ever met (in the political arena)." As legislative director, Lu led a 15-person group and was responsible for overseeing the drafting of all legislation and advising Obama on votes and policy decisions. When weighing difficult votes, Obama had Lu and his other staff members assemble together and argue about the issue in front of him. David Mendell, a Chicago Tribune reporter and Obama biographer, said Lu was among the "moderate voices in this atmosphere of smart young staffers." Lu advised Obama to vote in favor of the Military Commissions Act of 2006 because he felt it would have been politically wiser to support it, but Obama ultimately voted against it.

Lu said of his role as legislative director, "It's one of the most fun jobs in the Senate (but) it's also an incredibly difficult job because you have to know something about any given thing going on in the Senate at the time ... It takes a couple years off your life." Lu, along with Robert Gibbs and several other Obama staffers, read Obama's manuscript for The Audacity of Hope and provided him with several editorial suggestions.

Lu eventually became acting chief of staff in Obama's Senate office. When Obama announced his candidacy for president in February 2007, Lu did not move over to the campaign, but remained to continue running Obama's operations in the Senate; Lu said of Obama at that time, "Even while he was running for president, he had a day job [in the Senate]."

=== Obama administration ===
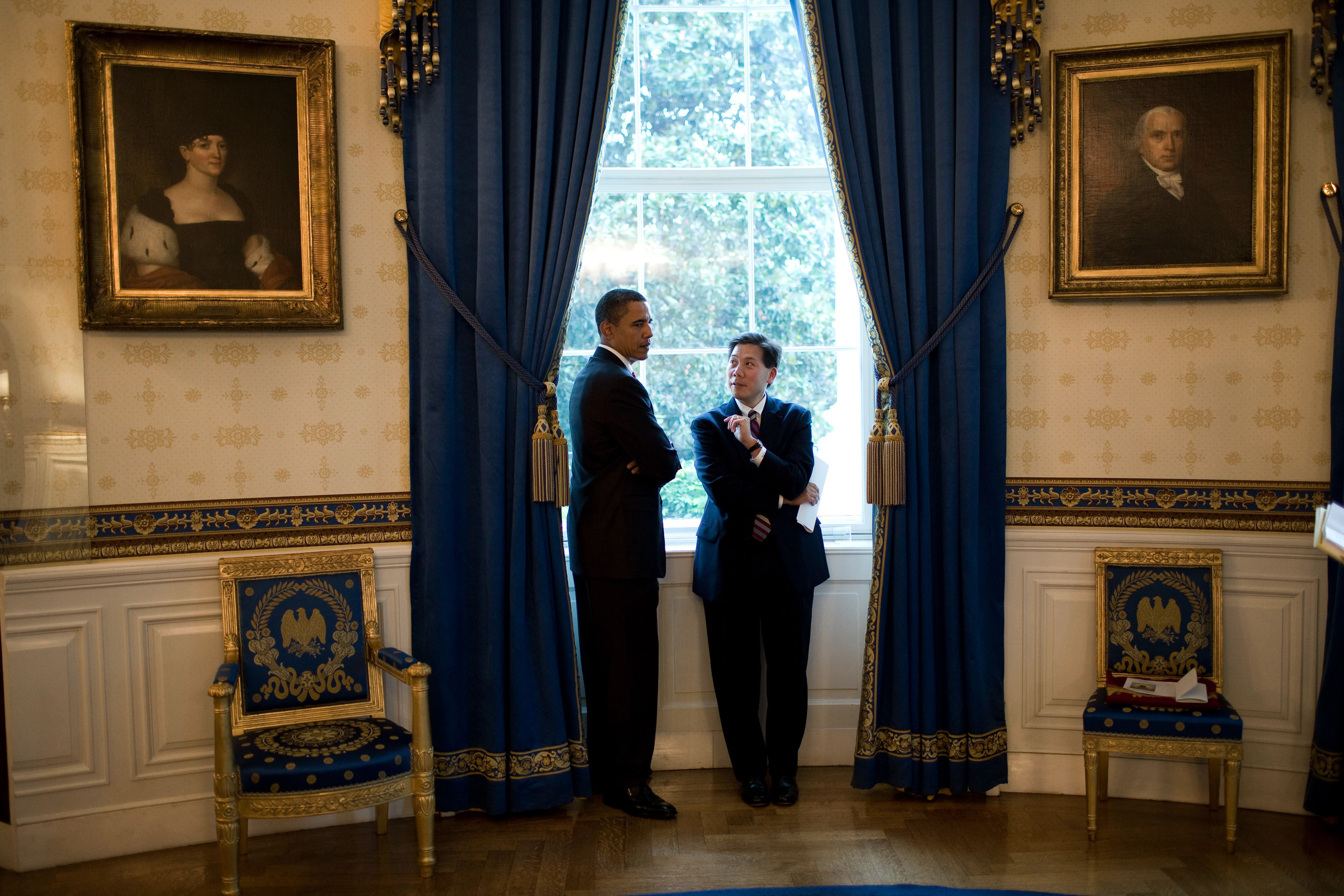
Lu with Obama in the Blue Room of the White House

In May 2008, Obama asked Lu to begin planning for a possible presidential transition. Obama warned him to tell no one about the nascent operation, even his own wife, so Lu quietly rented a small office in D.C. and secretly met with people who had worked on previous Democratic presidential transition efforts. The planning efforts produced policy options on a wide range of topics, compiled names of and began vetting potential political appointees for top jobs, arranged over 100 security clearances, and managed the logistics for expanding the operations after Election Day.

After Obama's victory, Lu became executive director of the Obama-Biden Transition Project, a position that was responsible for the day-to-day operations of the transition. During the transition period, Lu was in daily contact with Bush administration officials, managed the $9 million budget, and negotiated the ground rules for Obama transition representatives to gather information on federal agency operations and programs.

"My job (at the White House) is the same job I've had all along, which is to keep the trains running on time, and to make sure that on any given day, the White House and the agencies are all moving down the same set of tracks."

— Chris Lu

Obama selected Lu to serve as Cabinet Secretary, making him one of the highest-ranking Asian Americans in the administration, along with Secretary of Commerce Gary Locke and Secretary of Energy Steven Chu. At the time of his selection, The New York Times reporter Michael Falcone wrote, "By now, Mr. Lu knows the president-elect's record better than almost anyone."

Lu's responsibilities included representing Obama's positions to each of the Cabinet secretaries and agencies and coordinating a common White House agenda among them. Marc Ambinder, associate editor of The Atlantic, said of Lu, "when agency heads have a problem, or when the White House has a problem with an agency head, Mr. Lu will be the first person who's called, or calls."

In July 2009, Lu visited China as part of an official delegation for the Obama administration, along with Locke and Chu. Although his parents were born there, it was the first time Lu had set foot on Chinese soil. Lu was introduced to Chinese Premier Wen Jiabao, who said upon meeting Lu, "I know the name and also the importance of his position." In July 2010, Lu was a member of the official U.S. delegation to the Shanghai Expo, along with former Secretary of State Madeleine Albright.

On January 8, 2014, Lu was nominated by President Obama to be the Deputy Secretary for the United States Department of Labor. He was unanimously confirmed by the United States Senate on April 1, 2014. Lu became the first Asian American to hold the position, and only the second Asian American in history to serve as deputy secretary of a cabinet department, after Elaine Chao. Lu's service in this position ended on January 20, 2017, concurrent with the end of the Obama Administration.

=== Career after Obama administration ===
Lu soon took up positions as a Senior Fellow of the University of Virginia Miller Center, specializing in presidential scholarship, and as a senior advisor to FiscalNote. He remains heavily involved as a DNC superdelegate and co-chaired DNC Chairman Tom Perez's transition committee.

In November 2020, Lu was named a volunteer member of the Joe Biden presidential transition Agency Review Team to support transition efforts related to the United States Department of Labor.

=== Ambassador to United Nations ===
On April 27, 2021, President Joe Biden nominated Lu to serve as Permanent Representative of the United States of America to the United Nations for UN Management and Reform. Hearings on his nomination were held before the Senate Foreign Relations Committee on July 27, 2021. The committee reported his nomination favorably on August 4, 2021. The United States Senate confirmed Lu on December 18, 2021, by voice vote, and he was sworn into office on January 4, 2022.

Career after Biden administration

In November 2025, Lu was appointed co-chair of Abigail Spanberger's gubernatorial transition team.

Political offices
| Preceded by Ross Kyle | White House Cabinet Secretary; 2009–2013 | Succeeded by Danielle Gray |
| Preceded by Seth Harris | United States Deputy Secretary of Labor; 2014–2017 | Succeeded by Nancy Rooney; Acting |
