= O'Melveny & Myers =

International law firm based in Los Angeles

O'Melveny & Myers LLP
- Headquarters: 400 South Hope Street; Los Angeles, CA 90071, US
- No. of offices: 18
- No. of attorneys: 800
- Major practice areas: Litigation, transactions, and regulatory
- Key people: Bradley J. Butwin, chairman
- Revenue: $1.07 billion (2024)
- Date founded: January 2, 1885; 141 years ago
- Founder: Henry O'Melveny and Jackson Graves
- Website: www.omm.com

O'Melveny & Myers LLP is an American multinational law firm headquartered in Los Angeles. Founded in 1885, the firm employs approximately 800 lawyers and has offices in California, Washington, D.C., New York City, Texas, Beijing, Brussels, Hong Kong, London, Seoul, Shanghai, Singapore, and Tokyo.

== History ==
The firm was founded on January 2, 1885, as "Graves & O'Melveny" by Henry O'Melveny and Jackson Graves. At its founding, the firm consisted of the two attorneys themselves, with no other staff. The original one-paragraph written partnership agreement provided that "proceeds and expenses of said business" were to be split with three-fifths to Graves and two-fifths to O'Melveny, "until some other rate of division is agreed upon". The firm started with a single one-room office in an office building at 248 North Main Street in Los Angeles. That building was renumbered in 1904 to 342 North Main Street and was later demolished when the Santa Ana Freeway was built through its site.

The firm gained traction through its work on land litigation surrounding the ownership of California's Spanish haciendas and its handling of the legalities of hydroelectric power, which helped to transform the arid basin of Los Angeles into a car-centric metropolis. The firm became "O'Melveny & Myers" when Chief Justice of California Louis Wescott Myers joined the firm after retiring from the Supreme Court of California in 1926.

In 1977, O'Melveny hired William T. Coleman Jr., who had helped the country move toward desegregation 23 years prior as a lead strategist for the plaintiffs in the landmark Brown v. Board of Education.

The former chair of the firm, Arthur B. Culvahouse Jr., who serves at the firm's Washington, D.C. office, was White House Counsel during the Reagan administration. Former U.S. Secretary of State Warren Christopher (1925–2011), who served as the firm's chairman from 1981 to 1991, was a senior partner at the firm's Century City, California, office. Christopher supervised the largest period of growth in the firm's history, expanding to seven countries. Litigation partner Bradley J. Butwin became chair of the firm in 2012; his term extends until 2025.

The firm defended Donald Trump against a lawsuit over Trump University. O'Melveny vetted the president's nominees. The firm represented the Trump inaugural committee when it was investigated by the U.S. Attorney's Office for the Southern District of New York. O'Melveny also represented President Trump's commerce secretary, Wilbur Ross, over allegations of conflicted investments.

In November 2023, amid a wave of antisemitic incidents at elite U.S. law schools, O'Melveny & Myers was among a group of major law firms who sent a letter to top law school deans warning them that an escalation in incidents targeting Jewish students would have corporate hiring consequences. The letter said "We look to you to ensure your students who hope to join our firms after graduation are prepared to be an active part of workplace communities that have zero tolerance policies for any form of discrimination or harassment, much less the kind that has been taking place on some law school campuses."

== Reputation ==
The firm ranked number one on Vault.com's 2019 list of "Best Firms to Work For," a ranking of the world's law firms based on quality of life for attorneys. It received the highest rankings for "Job Satisfaction", "Associate/Partner Relations", "Best Firm Culture", "Quality of work", "Transparency", "Hours Requirements", "Summer Associate Program", and "Attorney Development." The firm ranked number six for "Best Attorney Compensation." According to Above the Law, first-year associates at the firm are paid a base salary of $215,000 with bonuses available yearly. Summer associates are paid the same salary, although it is prorated over 10 weeks (amounting to $3,700 per week). Vault ranked O'Melveny as the 4th most selective law firm in the world in 2019. However, a former attorney of the firm, and winner of the Wall Street Journal's "Law Blog's" Lawyer of the Year award in 2007, has criticized the firm's handling of discrimination and sexual abuse matters.

O'Melveny ranked in the Top 10 for the 5th consecutive year on the 2016 "A-List," a measure of the nation's most "well-rounded" firms. The firm has been a winner, finalist, or honorable mention recipient in every year of the biennial Litigation Department of the Year contest since its 2002 inception, one of only two firms to achieve that distinction.

It is one of the highest-paying law firms in the United States.

== Notable clients and cases ==
- International Lesbian, Gay, Bisexual, Trans and Intersex Association in So Sung-uk vs. the National Health Insurance Service, a landmark Supreme Court of Korea decision which upheld a ruling that same-sex couples are eligible for spousal benefits from the National Health Insurance Service
- In 2020, the firm defended Nancy Pelosi in a lawsuit challenging proxy voting rules adopted by congress in the face of the ongoing COVID-19 pandemic.
- The firm served as counsel to Mike Pence between 2020 and 2021, providing consult to Pence during the January 6 United States Capitol attack and testifying at public hearings of the United States House Select Committee on the January 6 attack that a vice president does not have the authority to change the outcome of an election.

== Notable partners and alumni ==
- Former partner Louis Caldera served as United States Secretary of the Army.
- Warren Christopher (1925–2011), former U.S. Secretary of State under President Bill Clinton, was a senior partner at the firm's Century City, CA office until his death in 2011.
- William Thaddeus Coleman Jr. (1920–2017), was Secretary of Transportation under President Gerald Ford, and also helped Thurgood Marshall win Brown v. Board of Education. Coleman was a senior partner and the Senior Counselor in the Washington, DC office.
- Thomas E. Donilon served as National Security Advisor under President Barack Obama, and serves in the Washington, DC office. He is known for being featured in the famous photograph, "The Situation Room."
- Chair Emeritus Arthur B. Culvahouse Jr., former White House Counsel to President Ronald Reagan and former United States Ambassador to Australia.
- Former partner Walter Dellinger (1941–2022) was United States Solicitor General for the 1996-97 Term of the Supreme Court.
- Former partner Danielle C. Gray served as a senior advisor to President Barack Obama. While serving in the Obama Administration, Newsweek referred to her as "the most powerful White House staffer you've never heard of."
- Former partner Sandra Segal Ikuta was a federal judge on the United States Court of Appeals for the Ninth Circuit.
- Former associate Mike Gatto is California State Assemblyman and chairman of the Appropriations Committee.
- Former associate Goodwin Liu is an Associate Justice of the Supreme Court of California.
- Former partner Kim McLane Wardlaw is a federal judge on the United States Court of Appeals for the Ninth Circuit.
- Former associate John B. Owens is a federal judge on the United States Court of Appeals for the Ninth Circuit.
- Former associate Stephen Reinhardt was a federal judge on the United States Court of Appeals for the Ninth Circuit.
- Former partner Michael David Zimmerman is a former Chief Justice of the Utah Supreme Court.
- Sri Srinivasan, now a federal judge on the United States Court of Appeals for the District of Columbia Circuit, was the former chair of the appellate practice.
- Former partner Alejandro Mayorkas is the Secretary of the Department of Homeland Security and was formerly both Deputy Secretary and director of U.S. Citizenship and Immigration Services.
- Pamela Harris, now a federal judge on the United States Court of Appeals for the Fourth Circuit.
- Richard Riordan, 39th Mayor of Los Angeles (1993–2001).
- Former partner Chuck Sullivan was vice president of the New England Patriots from 1970 to 1988 and promoter of The Jacksons Victory Tour.
- Former associate Milan Smith, U.S. Circuit Judge of the United States Court of Appeals for the Ninth Circuit.
- Partner Ron Klain, former White House chief of staff (2021–2023) returned to the law firm in April 2023.
- Marshall Rutter (1931–2024) began his career at O'Melveny & Myers in the 1960s. He went on to specialize in family law and was a long-term advocate of American choral music as co-founder of the Los Angeles Master Chorale in 1964.

== In culture ==
In an episode of The Sopranos, a DOJ prosecutor is heard saying, "He ruined his six-figure future at O'Melveny & Myers when he blew the Junior Soprano trial."
