= Dennis Merzel =

American Buddhist writer

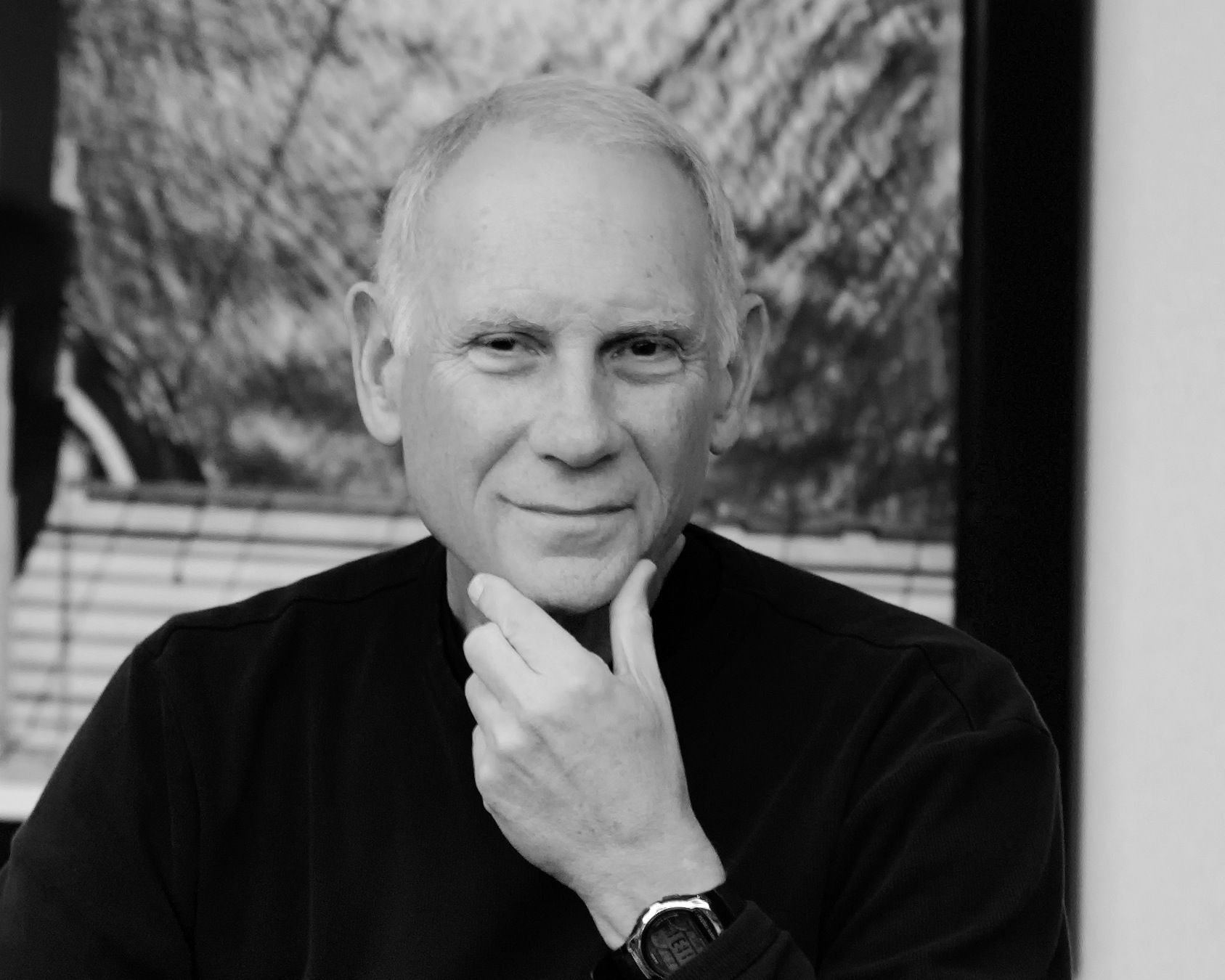
- Born: June 3, 1944 (age 82); Brooklyn, New York, U.S.
- Education: University of Southern California
- Occupations: Zen teacher and author

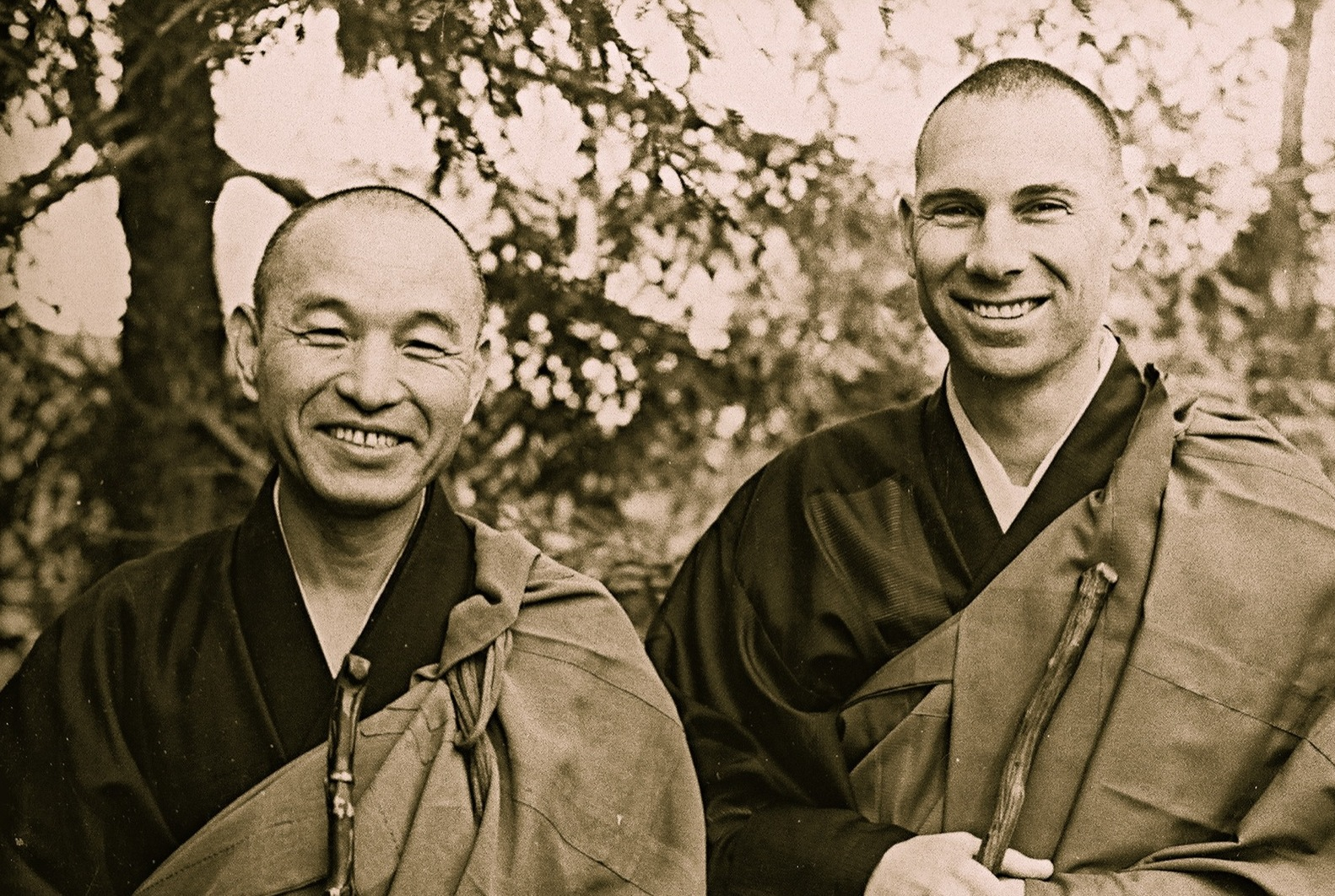
Taizan Maezumi and Merzel

Dennis Merzel (born June 3, 1944, in Brooklyn, New York) is an American Zen teacher and author. He is also known as Genpo Roshi.

== Early life ==
Dennis Paul Merzel was born on June 3, 1944, in Brooklyn, New York, and was raised and schooled in Long Beach, California. His family was Jewish (his grandfather was a Rabbi), but he was raised as an agnostic by his father and as an atheist by his mother. He was a champion swimmer and an all-American water polo player. He was a lifeguard and began teaching public school while obtaining a master's degree in educational administration from the University of Southern California.

== Zen Buddhism ==
While on a trip in 1971 to the Mojave Desert in California with two friends, Merzel had what he described as an "awakening experience". (Note: Big Mind: An Interview with Genpo Roshi) Following this, he left his career as a school teacher for a year to live in the mountains alone in a cabin near San Luis Obispo. In 1972 he met the Japanese-born Zen teacher Taizan Maezumi, and moved to Los Angeles to study under him.

Merzel was ordained as an unsui, or novice priest, in 1973. In 1980, a year after completing kōan study, Merzel received dharma transmission, becoming Maezumi's second Dharma successor. In 1981 Merzel underwent zuise (Note: Ceremonial "abbot-for-one-night" rituals at the head temples of the Soto school) in Japan, and in 1988 he was officially installed as abbot of Hosshinji Zen temple in Bar Harbor, Maine. (Note: IntegralNaked, Who is Genpo Roshi?) (Note: A traditional ceremony of "entering the temple" which marks the end of the monastic training period and becoming part of the clergy.)

In 1995 Merzel received the title of Dendō-kyōshi Kenshuso, a now defunct category officially recognizing Western Zen priests by the Sōtō School Headquarters in Japan (Sōtō-shū) . In 1996 Merzel received Inka from Bernie Glassman, after Maezumi's death in 1995. (Note: IntegralNaked: "Roshi Bernie had received Inka from Maezumi Roshi shortly before the latter's death in May of 1995." SweepingZen: "In the Japanese Rinzai schools, inka is the equivalent of Sōtō Zen dharma transmission (shiho ceremony), and is the final level of empowerment as a teacher. In the Harada-Yasutani lineage, inka is one level of empowerment beyond dharma transmission." Great Plains Zen Center: "This Inka ceremony grants final approval in our Rinzai lineage through Musa Koryu Roshi, another one of Maezumi Roshi's teachers.") This made Merzel Bernie Glassman's first Inka successor and made him the second in Maezumi Roshi's lineage to be recognized as a Zen Master.

Merzel was the founder and abbot of Kanzeon Zen Center in Salt Lake City from 1993 to 2011.

== Big Mind ==
In 1983 Merzel began studying Voice Dialogue—a Jungian therapeutic technique designed to expand the individual's ability to make choices in life rather than to behave in an automatic and unconscious fashion (Note: Hal Stone PhD and Sidra Stone PhD, Voice Dialogue: An Introduction to the Use of Voice Dialogue)—with Hal and Sidra Stone. Shortly thereafter, he began to experiment with integrating Voice Dialogue with the Zen tradition, (Note: Genpo Roshi to Diane Olson Rutter, The Search for Big Mind On the Trail to Enlightenment) and in 1999 he introduced the Big Mind Process; Japanese Soto Zen founder Dōgen Zenji uses the phrase in his Tenzo Kyōkun (Instructions to the Chief Cook). The aim of the Big Mind Process is to combine "Eastern, Buddhist insights with Western psychoanalytical ideas," (Note: Japanese Soto Zen founder Dōgen Zenji uses the phrase in his Tenzo Kyōkun (Instructions to the Chief Cook); as does 20th-century Zen master Shunryu Suzuki in talks collected in the book Zen Mind, Beginner's Mind. (Note: Brad Warner, Big Mind Sucks (Part A Million))) and according to Merzel:

It allows a person to step out of their ego and have a universal mind or mystical experience, to attain what is commonly called enlightenment, self realization, Christ mind, or Buddha mind.

Merzel has organized Big Mind retreats and events nationally and internationally, such as an annual event in the Netherlands that has attracted hundreds of participants. Responses to Big Mind have been variously negative and positive.

A study of Merzel's Big Mind process found that participants scored higher on various measures after participation, but the reported effects may also result from factors such as group effect, suggestibility, and/or simple expectation, and the participants had a high level of education, so it is unclear whether ordinary people would see the same results. (Note: For background on scientific research about meditation, see Linda Heuman, Meditation Nation, Tricycle April 25, 2014.)

== Sexual relationships with students ==
In 1988 Merzel was installed as abbot at Hosshinji, a Zen temple in Bar Harbor, Maine. He had a romantic relationship with a student, leading to the dissolution of the temple.

In 1992, a group of Zen teachers asked Taizan Maezumi to withdraw Merzel's sanction to teach, expressing concern about Merzel's relationships with a number of female students, his lack of remorse, and his lack of responsibility.

In 2011, after admitting to a sexual affair with an advanced student, Merzel said he would disrobe as a Buddhist priest, resign as an elder of the White Plum Asanga, step down as Abbot of Kanzeon, and stop teaching for an indefinite period to seek counseling. (Note: Peggy Fletches Stack, February 25, 2011, Utah Zen master admits affair, leaves center, The Salt Lake Tribune) A group of Buddhist teachers suggested that Merzel take a minimum one-year break from teaching and seek therapy. However, two months later, Merzel decided to resume teaching, saying that too many students and his organizations depended on him financially and spiritually. (Note: The Salt Lake Tribune, Zen teachers are livid Utah colleague in sex scandal still teaching) His choice was opposed by other Buddhist teachers. Merzel continued to lead retreats.

== Personal life ==
After his extramarital affairs with his students were revealed in 2011, he and his wife divorced.

== Heirs ==
Dennis Merzel has given Dharma transmission (shiho) to twenty-three students heirs, and inka (final acknowledgement) to fifteen Zen-teachers. He has given Jukai to 518 students and ordained 139 priests.

=== Dharma successors ===
- Catherine Genno Pagès (1992), Dana Zen Center, Paris, France
- John Shodo Flatt (1994, deceased), England
- Anton Tenkei Coppens (1996), Zen River, The Netherlands
- Malgosia Jiho Braunek (2003, deceased), Kandzeon Sangha, Warsaw, Poland
- Daniel Doen Silberberg (2003), Lost Coin Zen, San Francisco, US
- Nico Sojun Tydeman (2004), Zen Centrum Amsterdam
- Nancy Genshin Gabrysch (2006), England
- Diane Musho Hamilton (2006), Two Arrows Zen, Utah, US
- Michael David Zimmerman (2006), Two Arrows Zen, Utah, US
- Rich Taido Christofferson (2007), Seattle, Washington, US
- Michel Genko Dubois (2007), L'Association Dana, France
- Tamara Myoho Gabrysch (2008), Zen River, The Netherlands
- Maurice Shonen Knegtel (2009), Izen, The Netherlands
- KC Kyozen Sato (2009), Salt Lake City, Utah, US
- Judi Kanchi Warren (2010, deceased)
- Mark Daitoku Esterman (2014), Salt Lake Zen Group, Utah, US
- Mary Ellen Seien Sloan (2017), Salt Lake City, Utah, US
- Christian Jikishin von Wolkahof (2018), Düsseldorf, Germany
- Lynn Shozen Holbrook (2019), Salt Lake City, Utah
- Stefan Kenjitsu Coppens (2019), Kanzeon Zen Centrum, The Netherlands
- Krzysztof Furyu Leśniak (2019), Lublin, Poland
- Hank Yoshin Malinowski (2019), Amsterdam, the Netherlands
- Jacqueline Shosui Wellenstein (2019), Voorburg, The Netherlands

=== Inka transmission ===
- John Daido Loori (deceased), Zen Mountain Monastery, New York, US
- Catherine Genno Pages, Dana Zen Center, Paris, France
- Anton Tenkei Coppens, Zen River, The Netherlands
- Charles Tenshin Fletcher, Yokoji Zen Mountain Center, Idyllwild, California, US
- Nicolee Jikyo McMahon, Three Treasures Zen Community, San Diego County, California, US
- Susan Myoyu Anderson, Great Plains Zen Center, Wisconsin and Illinois, Great Wave Zen Sangha, Michigan, US
- Sydney Musai Walters, Prajna Zendo, Lamy, New Mexico, US
- Malgosia Jiho Braunek (deceased), Kandzeon Sangha, Warsaw, Poland
- Nancy Genshin Gabrysch, Kannon-ji Temple, Bilsborrow, England
- Daniel Doen Silberberg (2003), Lost Coin Zen, San Francisco, US
- Maurice Shonen Knegtel, Izen, The Netherlands
- Tamara Myoho Gabrysch, Zen River, The Netherlands
- Nico Sojun Tydeman (2018), Zen Centrum Amsterdam
- Rein Konpo Kaales, White Cloud Zen, Idaho
- Mark Daitoku Esterman (2022)

== Publications ==
=== Books ===
- The Eye Never Sleeps: Striking to the Heart of Zen (1991, Shambhala Publications)
- Beyond Sanity and Madness the Way of Zen Master Dogen (1994, Tuttle Publishing)
- 24/7 Dharma: Impermanence, No-Self, Nirvana (2001, Journey Editions)
- The Path of the Human Being: Zen Teachings on the Bodhisattva Way (2005, Shambhala Publications)
- Big Mind, Big Heart: Finding Your Way (2007, Big Mind Publishing)
- The Fool Who Thought He Was God (2013, Big Mind Publishing)
- Spitting Out the Bones: A Zen Master's 45 Year Journey (2016, Big Mind Publishing)

=== DVDs ===
- Big Mind Big Heart Revealed
- The Path of the Human Being
- Awakened by the 10,000 Dharmas
- From Student to Master
- Masculine and Feminine Energies
- The Teachings of Bodhidharma

== See also ==
- Timeline of Zen Buddhism in the United States

== Sources ==
- Borup, Jørn (2008), Japanese Rinzai Zen Buddhism: Myōshinji, a Living Religion, Brill
- Buddhist Society (1988), The Middle Way, Volumes 63-64
- Dōgen Zenji; Uchiyama, Kōshō (1983), Refining your Life: from the Zen Kitchen to Enlightenment, Translated by Thomas Wright & Kōshō Uchiyama, Weatherhill, ISBN 978-0-8348-0179-0
- Ford, James Ishmael (2006), Zen Master Who?: A Guide to the People And Stories of Zen, Wisdom Publications
- Johnson, Michael (2011), "A Randomized Study of a Novel Zen Dialogue Method for Producing Spiritual and Well Being Enhancement: Implications for End-of-Life Care", Journal of Holistic Nursing, 29 (3): 201–210, doi:10.1177/0898010110391265, PMID 21177528, S2CID 44579097
