= Broderick D. Johnson =

American lawyer

Broderick Johnson
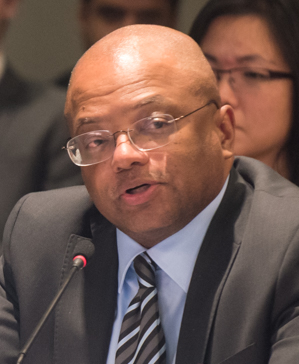
- Johnson in 2016

White House Cabinet Secretary
- In office January 13, 2014 – January 20, 2017
- President: Barack Obama
- Preceded by: Danielle Gray
- Succeeded by: Bill McGinley

Personal details
- Born: 1956 or 1957 (age 69–70) Baltimore, Maryland, U.S.
- Party: Democratic
- Spouse: Michele Norris (m. 1993)
- Education: College of the Holy Cross (BA); University of Michigan (JD)

Broderick D. Johnson (born 1956/1957) is an American lawyer who served as White House Cabinet Secretary under President Barack Obama from 2014 to 2017. He is currently the Executive Vice President at Comcast and a former partner at Bryan Cave. He also serves as the Chair of the My Brother's Keeper Task Force.

== Early life and education ==
Johnson was raised by devout Catholic parents in the Park Circle neighborhood of West Baltimore, Maryland. When Johnson was in the second grade, his parents transferred him to the now-defunct St. Ambrose Catholic School in Park Heights, where he became an altar boy. Following the 1968 Baltimore riots, his family moved from the city to Baltimore County, where Johnson attended Woodlawn High School.

After high school, Johnson graduated from the College of the Holy Cross in Worcester, Massachusetts, with a Bachelor of Arts in philosophy in 1978. As an undergraduate at Holy Cross, he initially studied history, but after his freshman year changed his major to philosophy. He was mentored by Holy Cross philosophy professor George Hampsch, a former Trappist monk.

After graduating, Johnson sought to become a philosophy professor and spent two years pursuing graduate studies at Bowling Green State University in applied philosophy. He then attended the University of Michigan Law School, where he was classmates with future Obama administration officials Ken Salazar and Valerie Jarrett, earning his Juris Doctor (J.D.) in 1983.

== Career ==
Johnson began his career in the United States House of Representatives, where he worked on drafting legislation including the Family and Medical Leave Act and the Immigration Reform and Control Act of 1986. He later served as chief counsel to the House Committee on the District of Columbia and as Democratic chief counsel to the House Committee on Education and the Workforce. In the Clinton administration, Johnson served as Deputy Assistant to the President for Legislative Affairs.

In the private sector, Johnson was previously a vice president at AT&T and Bell South corporations. Johnson has practiced law with Bryan Cave and co-founded a strategic consulting business. Johnson is also an adjunct professor at his alma mater, the University of Michigan Law School, where he teaches government relations.

== Personal life ==
Johnson is a native of Baltimore, Maryland. He lives in Washington, D.C., with his wife, Michele Norris, and their three children.

He has served as a board director of many groups, including Concerned Black Men, Project Northstar, and the Center for American Progress Action Fund.

Political offices
| Preceded by Danielle Gray | White House Cabinet Secretary; 2014–2017 | Succeeded by Bill McGinley |
