= Evan Ryan =

American public servant

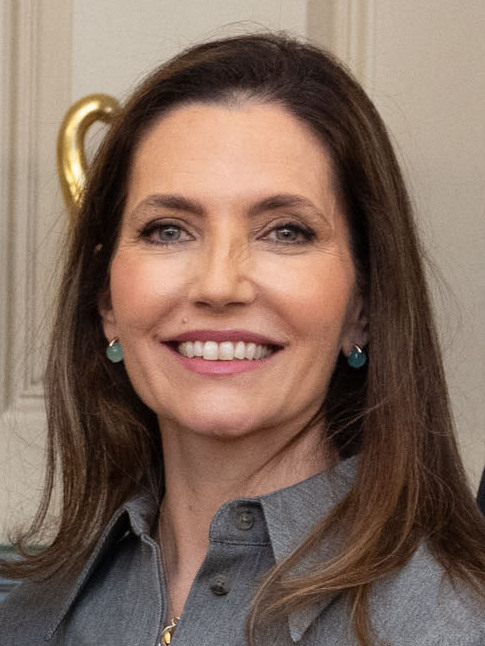
- Ryan in 2023

White House Cabinet Secretary
- In office January 20, 2021 – January 20, 2025
- President: Joe Biden
- Preceded by: Kristan King Nevins
- Succeeded by: Taylor Budowich; Lea Bardon (Director of Cabinet Affairs)

14th Assistant Secretary of State for Educational and Cultural Affairs
- In office September 26, 2013 – January 5, 2017
- President: Barack Obama
- Preceded by: Ann Stock
- Succeeded by: Marie Royce

Personal details
- Born: Alexandria, Virginia, U.S.
- Party: Democratic
- Spouse: Antony Blinken (m. 2002)
- Children: 2
- Education: Boston College (BA); Johns Hopkins University (MPP)

Evan Ryan is an American public servant who served as White House cabinet secretary in the administration of Joe Biden. She previously served as Assistant Secretary of State for Educational and Cultural Affairs (ECA) in the Obama administration (2013–2017) and was assistant for intergovernmental affairs and public liaison for then-Vice President Joe Biden.

== Early life and education ==
Ryan was born in Alexandria, Virginia, where she grew up in a middle-class family of Irish Catholic descent. She attended Georgetown Visitation Preparatory School in the Georgetown neighborhood of Washington, DC. Her mother is a kindergarten teacher and her father works for the US civil service. She received a Bachelor of Arts (BA) in political science from Boston College. In May 2006, she received her Master of Arts (MA) in international public policy from Johns Hopkins University's School of Advanced International Studies.

== Career ==
Ryan served under Secretary of State John Kerry as Assistant Secretary of State for Educational and Cultural Affairs and worked in the Obama-Biden White House as Assistant to the Vice President and Special Assistant to the President for Intergovernmental Affairs and Public Engagement from September 2013 to January 2017.

Prior to joining the Obama administration, Ryan served as deputy campaign manager for then-Senator Biden's 2008 presidential campaign and also served on the Kerry 2004 presidential campaign and Hillary Clinton's 2000 senatorial campaign. Ryan served in the Clinton White House, as deputy director of scheduling for First Lady Hillary Clinton and as special assistant to the first lady's chief of staff.

After leaving the White House in January 2017, she helped launch and lead Axios, and served as its executive vice president. She has worked as a consultant for the Education Partnership for Children of Conflict and served as deputy chair for the governance track of the Clinton Global Initiative. She is currently a member of the Council on Foreign Relations.

She was a senior advisor for the Biden-Harris transition team. In January 2021, she was appointed White House cabinet secretary.

== Personal life ==
Evan Ryan and Antony Blinken met in 1995 while working as White House staff members. They married in 2002 in an interfaith ceremony officiated by a rabbi and a priest at Holy Trinity Catholic Church in Washington, D.C.

They have two children, a son John Rowley Blinken born in March 2019 and a daughter Lila Ryan Blinken born on February 26, 2020. The children were born via two different gestational surrogates.

At the end of his term, Biden named Ryan to the Board of Trustees of the Kennedy Center.

Government offices
Preceded by Ann Stock	Assistant Secretary of State for Educational and Cultural Affairs; 2014–2017	Succeeded by Mark Taplin; Acting
Preceded by Kristan King Nevins	White House Cabinet Secretary; 2021–2025	Succeeded by Taylor Budowich
Preceded by Kristan King Nevins	White House Cabinet Secretary; 2021–2025	Succeeded by Lea Bardon as Director of Cabinet Affairs
