= Danielle C. Gray =

U.S. government official

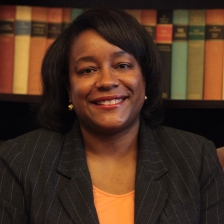

White House Cabinet Secretary
- In office January 25, 2013 – January 13, 2014
- President: Barack Obama
- Preceded by: Chris Lu
- Succeeded by: Broderick D. Johnson

Personal details
- Born: 1977 or 1978 (age 48–49) Riverhead, New York, U.S.
- Party: Democratic
- Education: Duke University (BA); Harvard University (JD)

Danielle Gray is the former Assistant to the President, Cabinet Secretary, and a Senior Advisor to U.S. President Barack Obama. Previously, Gray served as Deputy Director of the National Economic Council and Deputy Assistant to the President for Economic Policy. Gray is currently executive vice president, policy and regulatory affairs at UnitedHealth Group.

== Early life ==
A native of Riverhead, New York, Danielle Gray graduated from Duke University and in 2003 from Harvard Law School, where she served as an editor of Harvard Law Review and was voted by her classmates "most likely to be a Supreme Court justice."

== Career ==
Danielle Gray worked as a law clerk for Judge Merrick Garland on the United States Court of Appeals for the District of Columbia Circuit. She also worked as a law clerk for Justice Stephen Breyer on the Supreme Court of the United States.

Gray worked on the policy and research staff of then State Senator Barack Obama's 2004 campaign for United States Senate. She was also an early member of U.S. Senator Obama's campaign for President, working as Deputy National Policy Director for the Obama for America Presidential Campaign in 2007-2008.

== Obama administration ==
After assisting with President Barack Obama's transition to office, Gray was appointed as Special Assistant to the President and Associate Counsel to the President in the Office of White House Counsel. There she provided legal advice on key domestic and economic policy issues facing the administration. She also worked on judicial nominations, including the confirmations of Justice Sotomayor and Justice Kagan. Gray later moved to the Department of Justice, where she served as senior counsel to the assistant attorney general for the Civil Division. In this role she focused on constitutional challenges to federal statutes, policies, and agency actions and helped guide the legal strategy of the Obama Administration. Gray is also recognized as one of the lawyers who helped pass and ensure that the Affordable Care Act was upheld. Gray returned to the White House in early 2011 upon her appointment as Deputy Assistant to the President for Economic Policy and Deputy Director of the National Economic Council. As Deputy to National Economic Council Director Gene Sperling, Gray oversaw and developed policies related to a range of economic issues facing the country. Gray remained in this role until January 2013, when she was appointed Assistant to the President and Cabinet Secretary, a position previously occupied by Chris Lu. Recognized as a "rising superstar in the Obama administration" and "an instrumental force in driving the president's second term agenda," longtime White House advisor Gene Sperling says, "Danielle is the rare brand of intellectual powerhouse, policy strategist and doer's doer that will put her on the short-list for cabinet level jobs for Democratic presidents for the next four decades [...] That's a guarantee, not a prediction." Newsweek called her "the most powerful White House staffer you've never heard of."

Gray left her post as Cabinet Secretary in January 2014.

== Post-Obama administration ==
Following her time in the Obama administration, she became a partner at O'Melveny & Myers LLP. She later worked at Blue Cross and Blue Shield of North Carolina, where she was senior vice president, chief legal and administrative officer and corporate secretary, overseeing operations related to legal, audit, government affairs, compliance, external communications, marketing and community in engagement, before joining Walgreens in August 2021.

== See also ==
- List of law clerks for the second seat of the Supreme Court of the United States

Political offices
Preceded by Chris Lu	White House Cabinet Secretary; 2013–2014	Succeeded by Broderick Johnson
