= Michael David Zimmerman =

American judge

Michael Zimmerman
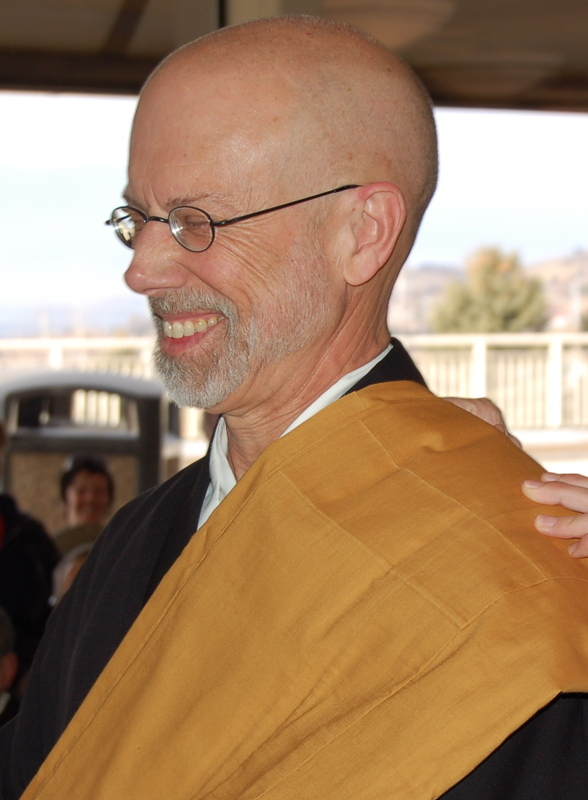
- Zimmerman in 2006

Chief Justice of the Utah Supreme Court
- In office 1994–1998
- Appointed by: Scott M. Matheson
- Preceded by: Gordon R. Hall
- Succeeded by: Richard C. Howe

Justice of the Utah Supreme Court
- In office 1984–2000

Personal details
- Born: October 21, 1943 (age 82) Chicago, Illinois, U.S.
- Spouse: Diane Musho Hamilton
- Education: University of Utah

Michael David Zimmerman (born October 21, 1943) is an American lawyer and Buddhist teacher. He served as the chief justice of the Utah Supreme Court.

Zimmerman was born in Chicago, Illinois, in 1943. He attended university at the University of Utah, entering its law school and graduating first in his class. He was awarded Order of the Coif membership for his academic achievement.

== Legal career ==
Following graduation, Zimmerman moved to Washington, D.C., and worked as a judicial clerk for Warren E. Burger, then the Chief Justice of the United States Supreme Court. He then moved to Los Angeles, where he worked as an associate at O'Melveny & Myers from 1970 to 1976. His practice there included federal and state appellate matters, including cases before the U.S. Supreme Court.

Zimmerman returned to Utah in 1976 and joined the faculty of the University of Utah College of Law as an associate professor. He later taught as an adjunct professor and supervised the law school's national moot court teams. He also entered private practice in Salt Lake City, working with Kruse, Landa, Zimmerman & Maycock and later becoming a shareholder at Watkiss & Campbell. From 1978 to 1984, he served part-time as special counsel to Utah Governor Scott Matheson.

From 1984 to 2000, Zimmerman served as a justice of the Utah Supreme Court, and from 1994 to 1998 he was Chief Justice. During his judicial tenure, he served on the federal advisory committee responsible for the Federal Rules of Civil Procedure and participated in Utah commissions and judicial task forces concerning constitutional revision and racial, ethnic, and gender fairness in the justice system.

After leaving the court in 2000, Zimmerman returned to private practice. He joined Snell & Wilmer and later became a partner, focusing on appellate litigation, arbitration, and mediation. In 2011, he co-founded Zimmerman Booher, a Salt Lake City law firm specializing in appellate practice. He has also served as an arbitrator, mediator, special master, and member or chair of several Utah legal and criminal-justice commissions

=== Selected judicial opinions ===
During his sixteen years on the Utah Supreme Court, Zimmerman wrote and joined opinions addressing state constitutional interpretation, criminal procedure, and the relationship between religion and government.

Zimmerman advocated interpreting provisions of the Utah Constitution independently of analogous provisions in the federal Constitution. In a separate concurrence in State v. Hygh (1985), he criticized federal search-and-seizure doctrine as confusing and argued that Utah could adopt clearer rules providing greater and more consistent protection against warrantless searches. Zimmerman reiterated that position in his dissent in State v. Watts (1988).

The court subsequently adopted an independent state constitutional analysis in State v. Larocco (1990). The majority opinion expressly cited Zimmerman's Hygh concurrence and adopted its reasoning that Utah could establish clearer restrictions on warrantless vehicle searches than those imposed under federal law. Zimmerman joined the majority opinion, which reversed a conviction because police had opened a parked vehicle to inspect a concealed vehicle identification number without first obtaining a warrant.

Zimmerman also wrote the majority opinion in Society of Separationists v. Whitehead (1993), which held that the Salt Lake City Council's practice of permitting nonsectarian opening prayers did not violate the religious-liberty provisions of the Utah Constitution.

=== Other notable majority opinions ===
Mountain Fuel Supply Co. v. Salt Lake City Corp., 752 P.2d 884 (Utah 9 March 1988). Zimmerman, writing for the majority, explained that Utah’s constitutional guarantee of uniform operation of the laws could impose more rigorous scrutiny than federal equal-protection doctrine. Applying that standard, the court upheld Salt Lake City’s utility tax, rejecting Mountain Fuel’s argument that taxing gas and electric suppliers—but not sellers of firewood, coal, bottled gas, and fuel oil—was unconstitutionally discriminatory.

State v. Thurman, 846 P.2d 1256 (Utah 7 January 1993). In an interlocutory pretrial appeal by Steven Thurman in a capital murder case arising from the pipe-bomb death of 11-year-old Adam Cook, Zimmerman wrote for the majority. The court upheld evidence found in a separate storage unit even though six officers had forced their way into Thurman’s 650-square-foot apartment less than thirty seconds after knocking, handcuffed him, and left him with a bloody nose. The majority held that a second consent given five hours later was voluntary and sufficiently separated from the earlier police misconduct.

=== Awards and honors ===
Zimmerman was named Appellate Judge of the Year by the Utah State Bar in 1988. In 1994, he received the inaugural Excellence in Ethics Award from the Center for the Study of Ethics at Utah Valley State College. He received the Peter W. Billings Sr. Outstanding Dispute Resolution Service Award from the American Arbitration Association in 1997, the Utah State Bar's Distinguished Service Award in 1998, and an honorary Doctor of Laws degree from the University of Utah in 2001.

== Zen Buddhism ==
Zimmerman began meditating in 1993, during the final year of his first wife Lynne Mariani Zimmerman's life. She was battling cancer at the time and died in January 1994 after a year-long struggle with the illness. He continued to serve as Chief Justice of the Utah Supreme Court during this time, while also raising their three daughters on his own.

In 1996, through his work in the courts, he met Diane Musho Hamilton and began sitting zazen at Kanzeon Zen Center. In 1998 he received jukai and was given the Buddhist name of Mugaku ("no learning"). Later that year, he was married by his teacher, Dennis Merzel, to Hamilton. In December 2006, he received Dharma transmission from Merzel, giving him authority to teach Zen to others.

In 2008, Zimmerman and Hamilton co-founded Boulder Mountain Zendo in Torrey, Utah. The community later became Two Arrows Zen, with zendos in Torrey and Salt Lake City.

He received the final seal of inka in 2018 from Sidney Musai Walter Roshi. Zimmerman is a member of the White Plum Asanga.

== See also ==
- List of law clerks for the chief justice of the United States
