= Kristan King Nevins =

American political advisor

White House Cabinet Secretary
- In office September 24, 2019 – January 20, 2021
- President: Donald Trump
- Preceded by: Matthew Flynn (Acting)
- Succeeded by: Evan Ryan

Personal details
- Born: Kristan King Lubbock, Texas, U.S.
- Party: Republican
- Spouse: Kyle Nevins (m. 2008)
- Children: 3
- Education: Texas A&M University (BBA); University of North Carolina, Chapel Hill (MBA)

Kristan King Nevins is an American political advisor who served as White House Cabinet Secretary in the first Trump Administration.

== Early life and education ==
Nevins was born and raised in Lubbock, Texas. She earned a Bachelor of Business Administration from Texas A&M University and Master of Business Administration from the University of North Carolina at Chapel Hill.

== Career ==
Nevins began her career as an employee at JPMorgan Chase. She later worked as an associate at Dutko Worldwide, a lobbying firm. Nevins served as Chief of Staff to former First Lady Barbara Bush. She later worked as Director of Outreach at the Barbara Bush Foundation for Family Literacy and Director of Strategy at SBD Advisors, LLC, a management consulting firm. Nevins also served in the United States Department of State and Central Intelligence Agency.

In February 2017, it was announced that Nevins would serve as Chief of Staff to Second Lady Karen Pence. Nevins left Pence's office in January 2018, becoming Chief of Staff to Texas Congressman Will Hurd. Nevins returned to the White House Office in 2019, serving as Assistant to the President and White House Cabinet Secretary.

On December 16, 2020, Trump stated his intention to nominate Nevins as a board member of the Institute of Education Sciences. After serving in the Trump administration, Nevins went to work for Blackstone as a managing director of government relations.

== Personal life ==
Nevins is married to Kyle Nevins, a businessman and former congressional aide. He is a co-founder of Harbinger Strategies and formerly worked for Representatives Eric Cantor and Roy Blunt. Nevins and her husband have three children and live in Washington, D.C.

Political offices
Preceded by Matthew Flynn; Acting	White House Cabinet Secretary; 2019–2021	Succeeded by Evan Ryan
