= Diane Musho Hamilton =

American Buddhist educator

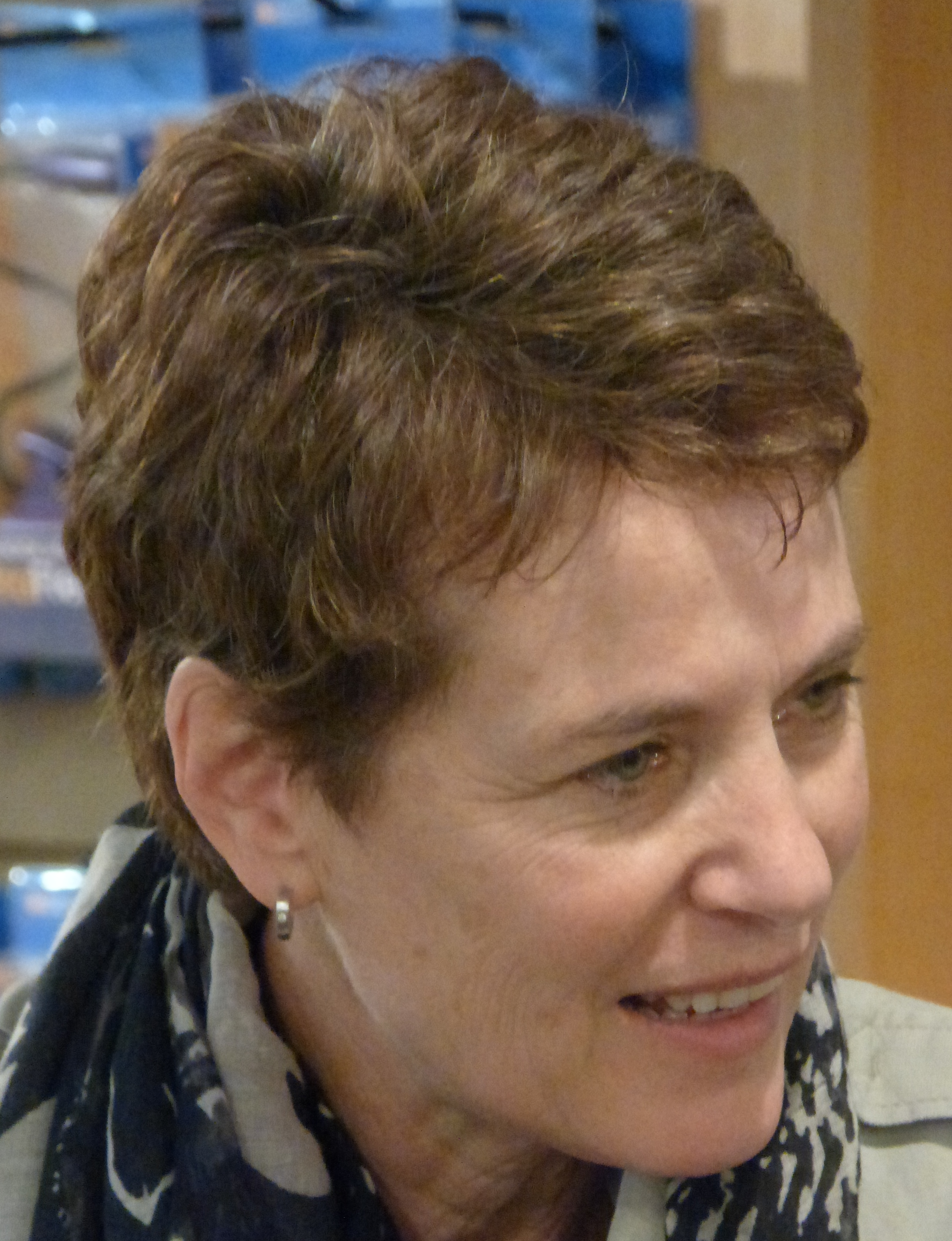
Diane Musho Hamilton in 2014

Diane Musho Hamilton is an American Zen teacher, mediator, facilitator, and author based in Salt Lake City, Utah. She is known for work at the intersection of Buddhist practice and conflict resolution. Her career has included service as the first director of the Utah judiciary's Office of Alternative Dispute Resolution and leadership at Two Arrows Zen. She is the author or co-author of books including Everything Is Workable, The Zen of You and Me, Compassionate Conversations, and Waking Up and Growing Up.

== Career ==
Hamilton's work has combined mediation, facilitation, Buddhist teaching, and writing.

=== Mediation and facilitation ===
In 1994, she became the first director of the Office of Alternative Dispute Resolution for the Utah Judiciary, a position she held until 1999. In that role, she established mediation programs throughout the court system and trained volunteer mediators, including for a 1996 landlord-tenant mediation program in Salt Lake's 3rd Circuit Court. Her conflict-resolution work during this period also included teaching conflict-resolution skills.

She has mediated divorces, probate, employment, contracts, and multi-party negotiations, and has facilitated public conversations around culture, religion, race, and gender. The episode description for her 2023 conversation with Sam Harris similarly described her as an award-winning mediator and founder of the Real LIFE Facilitator Program, with experience ranging from neighborhood disputes to complex negotiations.

She taught mediation at the University of Utah law school and communications institute and helped build facilitator-training programs drawing on developmental and contemplative frameworks.

Hamilton has been associated with Ken Wilber and the Integral Institute. She co-founded the Integral Facilitator training pathway in 2012. Her more recent teaching work has included Real LIFE programs and facilitator training oriented toward dialogue, adult development, and conflict transformation.

=== Buddhist lineage and teaching ===
In 1983, Hamilton began studying Buddhism with Chögyam Trungpa at Naropa University, where she later earned a master's degree. She became a Zen student of Dennis Merzel in 1997 and was ordained as a Zen monk in 2003. She and her husband Michael David Zimmerman received dharma transmission in 2006 from Merzel in the Taizan Maezumi lineage.

In 2008, Zimmerman and Hamilton co-founded Boulder Mountain Zendo in Torrey, Utah. The community later became Two Arrows Zen, with zendos in Torrey and Salt Lake City. Hamilton received the final seal of inka in 2018 from Sidney Musai Walter Roshi. She is a member of the White Plum Asanga.

Her Buddhist teaching has been featured in venues including Tricycle: The Buddhist Review, which published excerpts from her books and hosted the subscription video series A Zen Approach to Conflict in 2014.

=== Publications ===
As of June 2026, Hamilton has authored or co-authored four books.

Year	Title	Co-authors	Publisher	ISBN
2013	Everything Is Workable: A Zen Approach to Conflict Resolution	—	Shambhala Publications	9781611800678
2017	The Zen of You and Me: A Guide to Getting Along with Just About Anyone	—	Shambhala Publications	9781611803785
2020	Compassionate Conversations: How to Speak and Listen from the Heart	Gabriel Kaigen Wilson; Kimberly Myosai Loh	Shambhala Publications	9781611807783
2025	Waking Up and Growing Up: Spiritual Cross-Training for an Evolving World	Gabriel Kaigen Wilson	Shambhala Publications	9781645473114

Hamilton has also contributed to Buddhist anthologies including The Hidden Lamp, The Dharma of Dogs, and Radical Compassion.

In 2015, Harvard Business Review published her article "Calming Your Brain During Conflict."

=== Selected media appearances ===
- Tricycle – A Zen Approach to Conflict (October 2014), a subscription video dharma-talk series on conflict transformation.
- Sam Harris/Waking Up – Ethics and Emptiness (October 24, 2023), a conversation on meditation, ethics, awakening, and development; the official episode page is accessible, while the full audio is subscriber-only.
- This Very Moment – Episode 7, "From Hardship to Heart-Opening" (April 15, 2026), published by Shambhala.
- Deep Transformation – The Essence of Zen: One Heart, One Mind (recorded September 13, 2021; published 2022), later mirrored at Integral Life.
- Deep Transformation – Episode 232, "Zen for a World on Fire" (released April 30, 2026; posted at Integral Life on May 21, 2026), with Gabriel Kaigen Wilson.

== Awards and honors ==
Hamilton is a recipient of the Utah Council on Conflict Resolution Peacekeeper Award, the Peter W. Billings Award from the Utah State Bar, the Utah Judicial Administration Award, "Friend of the Court," and the 2016 BYU Center for Conflict Resolution Peacemaker Award.
