= White House Cabinet Secretary =

Presidential liaison with the Cabinet

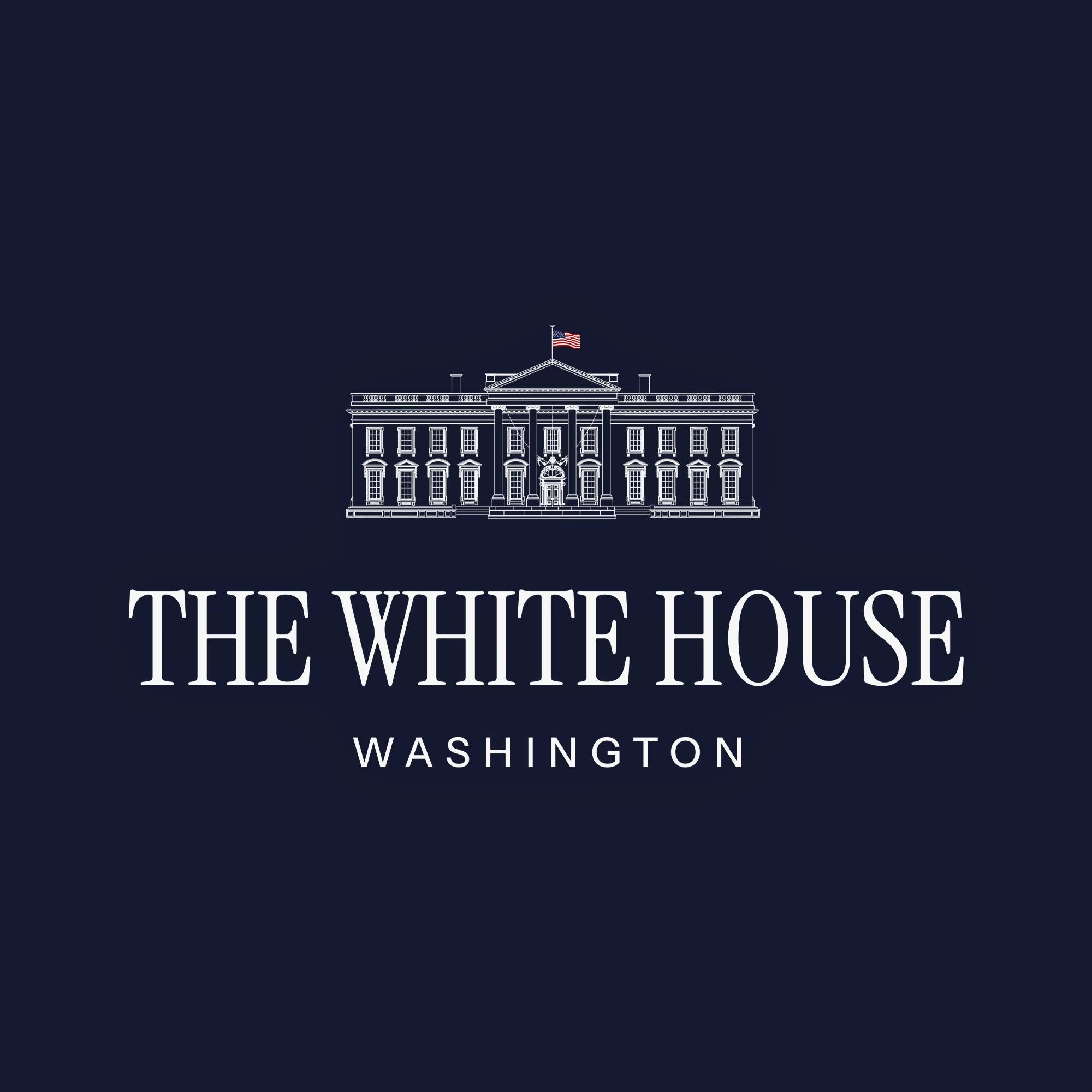
- Incumbent; Meghan Bauer since November 21, 2025
- White House Office
- Salary: $173,922 Annually

The White House cabinet secretary is a high-ranking position within the Executive Office of the President of the United States. The White House cabinet secretary is the head of the Office of Cabinet Affairs (OCA) within the White House Office and the primary liaison between the president of the United States and the Cabinet departments and agencies. The position is usually held by a White House commissioned officer, traditionally either a deputy assistant to the president or an assistant to the president.

According to the White House website, the cabinet secretary helps "to coordinate policy and communications strategy" and plays "a critical role in managing the flow of information between the White House and the federal departments and in representing the interests of the Cabinet to the White House."

The White House cabinet secretary is appointed by and serves at the pleasure of the president; the position does not require Senate confirmation. The White House cabinet secretary is among the twenty-two highest paid positions in the White House.

== Current appointees ==
- Special Assistant to the President and Director of Cabinet Affairs: Lea Bardon
  - Associate Director of Policy: Thomas Bradbury
  - Associate Director for Agency Outreach: Cami Connor

== List of cabinet secretaries ==
Denotes acting capacity.

Image	Name	Start	End	President
	Max Rabb	October 1953	May 19, 1958	Dwight D. Eisenhower (1953–1961)
	Bob Gray	May 19, 1958	January 20, 1961	Dwight D. Eisenhower (1953–1961)
	Fred Dutton	January 20, 1961	December 4, 1961	John F. Kennedy (1961–1963)
	Unknown	December 4, 1961	November 22, 1963	John F. Kennedy (1961–1963)
	Horace Busby	November 22, 1963	September 15, 1965	Lyndon B. Johnson (1963–1969)
	Unknown	September 15, 1965	March 31, 1966	Lyndon B. Johnson (1963–1969)
	Bob Kintner	March 31, 1966	June 14, 1967	Lyndon B. Johnson (1963–1969)
	Unknown	June 14, 1967	January 20, 1969	Lyndon B. Johnson (1963–1969)
	John Whitaker	January 20, 1969	November 4, 1969	Richard Nixon (1969–1974)
	Alexander Butterfield; Acting	November 4, 1969	August 9, 1974	Richard Nixon (1969–1974)
	Warren Rustand	August 9, 1974	January 5, 1975	Gerald Ford (1974–1977)
	Jim Connor	January 5, 1975	January 20, 1977	Gerald Ford (1974–1977)
	Jack Watson	January 20, 1977	June 11, 1980	Jimmy Carter (1977–1981)
	Gene Eidenberg	June 11, 1980	January 20, 1981	Jimmy Carter (1977–1981)
	Craig Fuller	September 14, 1981	January 30, 1985	Ronald Reagan (1981–1989)
	Alfred Kingon	January 30, 1985	February 18, 1987	Ronald Reagan (1981–1989)
	Nancy Risque	February 18, 1987	January 20, 1989	Ronald Reagan (1981–1989)
	Phillip Brady	January 20, 1989	June 26, 1989	George H. W. Bush (1989–1993)
	Steve Danzansky	June 26, 1989	April 20, 1991	George H. W. Bush (1989–1993)
	Gary Blumenthal	June 10, 1991	September 10, 1992	George H. W. Bush (1989–1993)
	Daniel Casse	September 10, 1992	January 20, 1993	George H. W. Bush (1989–1993)
	Christine Varney	January 20, 1993	October 14, 1994	Bill Clinton (1993–2001)
	Kitty Higgins	January 26, 1995	February 7, 1997	Bill Clinton (1993–2001)
	Thurgood Marshall Jr.	February 7, 1997	January 20, 2001	Bill Clinton (1993–2001)
	Albert Hawkins	January 20, 2001	January 2003	George W. Bush (2001–2009)
	Brian Montgomery	January 2003	February 24, 2005	George W. Bush (2001–2009)
	Heidi Smith	February 24, 2005	2006	George W. Bush (2001–2009)
	Neal Burnham; Acting	2006	August 9, 2006	George W. Bush (2001–2009)
	Ross Kyle	August 9, 2006	November 3, 2006	George W. Bush (2001–2009)
	Ross Kyle	November 3, 2006	January 20, 2009	George W. Bush (2001–2009)
	Chris Lu	January 20, 2009	January 25, 2013	Barack Obama (2009–2017)
	Danielle Gray	January 25, 2013	January 13, 2014	Barack Obama (2009–2017)
	Broderick Johnson	January 13, 2014	January 20, 2017	Barack Obama (2009–2017)
	Bill McGinley	January 20, 2017	July 19, 2019	Donald Trump (2017–2021)
	Matthew Flynn; Acting	July 19, 2019	September 24, 2019	Donald Trump (2017–2021)
	Kristan King Nevins	September 24, 2019	January 20, 2021	Donald Trump (2017–2021)
	Evan Ryan	January 20, 2021	January 20, 2025	Joe Biden (2021–2025)
	Taylor Budowich	January 20, 2025	September 30, 2025	Donald Trump (2025–present)
	Meghan Bauer	November 21, 2025	present	Donald Trump (2025–present)

=== Director of Cabinet Affairs ===
During the second Trump administration, Budowich had been designated as Cabinet Secretary through his role as a White House Deputy Chief of Staff for Communications and Personnel with a portfolio that also oversaw the White House Communications Director, White House Press Secretary, White House Director of Speechwriting, White House Office of Public Liaison, and White House Presidential Personnel Office. Beneath him, there was a Director of Cabinet Affairs leading OCA.

Image	Name	Start	End	President
	Lea Bardon	January 20, 2025	April 10, 2026	Donald Trump (2025–present)
