= List of Donald Trump 2020 presidential campaign political endorsements =

This is a list of notable individual politicians and political organizations who publicly indicated support for Donald Trump in the 2020 United States presidential election.

== Trump federal executive officials ==
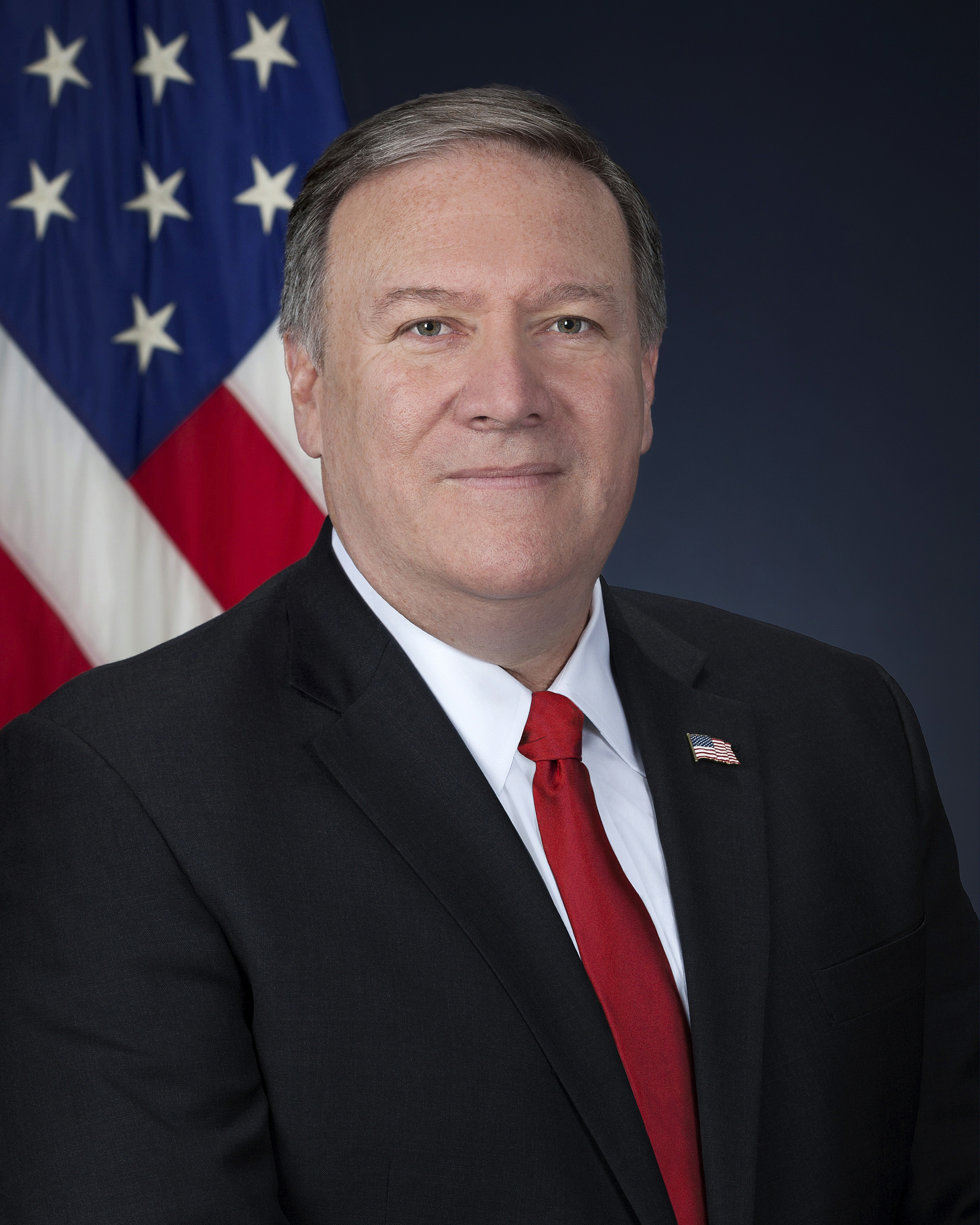
Mike Pompeo

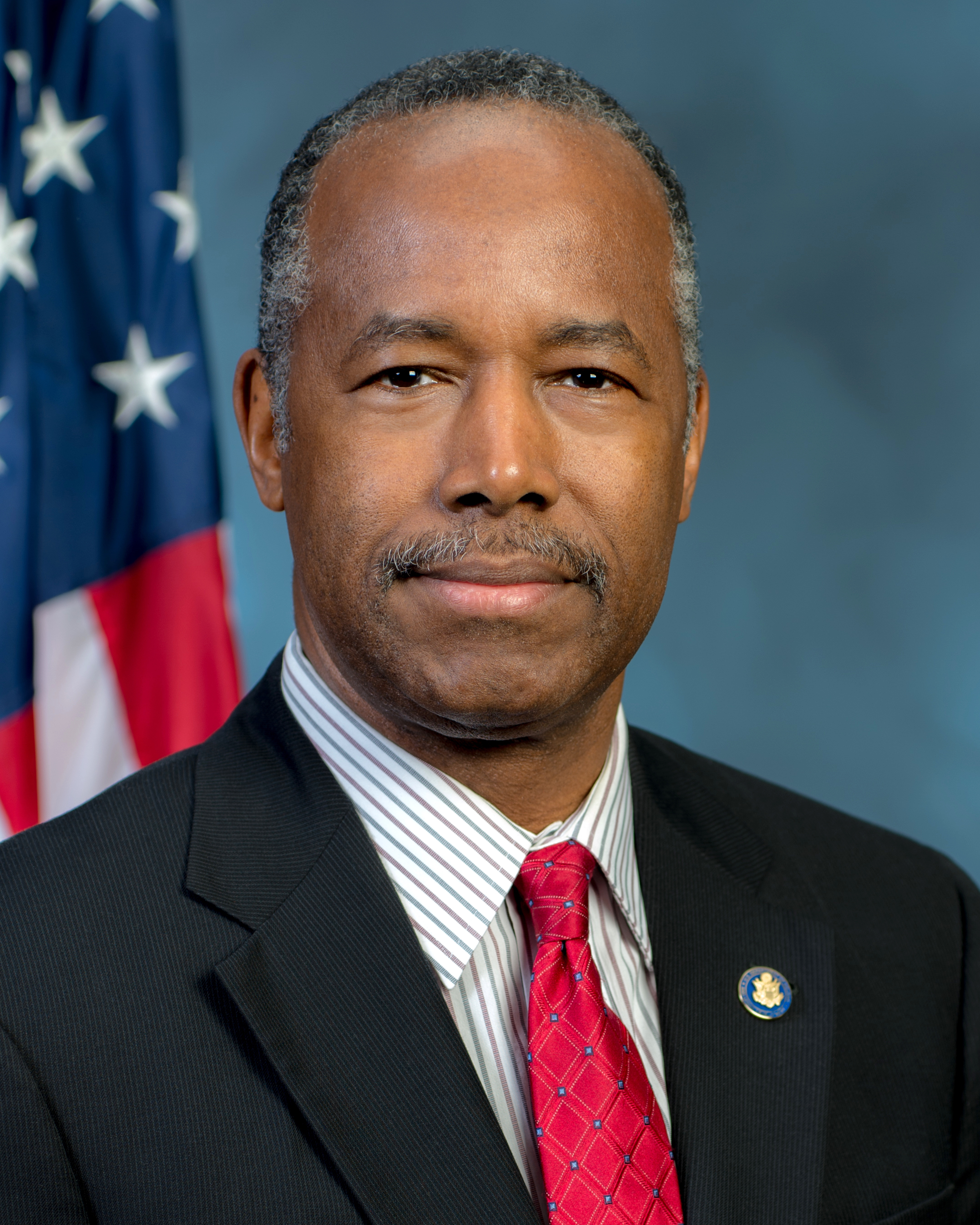
Ben Carson

- Alex Azar, U.S. Secretary of Health and Human Services (2018–2021) and United States Deputy Secretary of Health and Human Services (2005–2007)
- David Bernhardt, U.S. Secretary of the Interior (2019–2021) and United States Deputy Secretary of the Interior (2017–2019)
- Jovita Carranza, Administrator of the Small Business Administration (2020–2021) and Treasurer of the United States (2017–2020)
- Ben Carson, Secretary of Housing and Urban Development (2017–2021)
- Elaine Chao, U.S. Secretary of Transportation (2017–2021) and U.S. Secretary of Labor (2001–2009)
- Edward Crawford, U.S. Ambassador to Ireland (2019–2021)
- Louis DeJoy, U.S. Postmaster General (2020–2025)
- Betsy DeVos, U.S. Secretary of Education (2017–2021)
- David Friedman, U.S. Ambassador to Israel (2017–2021)
- Richard Grenell, special envoy for the Serbia and Kosovo Peace Negotiations (2019–2021)
- Keith Kellogg, National Security Advisor to the Vice President of the United States (2018–2021)
- Larry Kudlow, Director of the National Economic Council (2018–2021)
- Jared Kushner, Senior Advisor to the President (2017–2021), Director of the Office of American Innovation (2017–2021) and son-in-law to Donald Trump
- Kayleigh McEnany, White House Press Secretary (2020–2021)
- Mark Meadows, White House Chief of Staff (2020–2021) and U.S .Representative for NC-13 (2013–2020)
- Mick Mulvaney, United States Special Envoy for Northern Ireland (2020–2021), White House Chief of Staff (2019–2020), director of the Office of Management and Budget (2017–2019)
- Peter Navarro, Director of the Office of Trade and Manufacturing Policy (2017–2021) and Director of the National Trade Council (2017)
- Robert C. O'Brien, National Security Advisor (2019–2021) and Special Envoy for Hostage Affairs (2017–2018)
- Sonny Perdue, U.S. Secretary of Agriculture (2017–2021)
- Mike Pompeo, Secretary of State (2018–2021), Director of the Central Intelligence Agency (2017–2018)
- Brooke Rollins, Director of the Domestic Policy Council (2020–2021)
- Wilbur Ross, U.S. Secretary of Commerce (2017–2021)
- Dan Scavino, White House Deputy Chief of Staff (2020–2021)
- Ja'Ron Smith, Assistant to the President for domestic policy (2019–2021)
- Ivanka Trump, Advisor to the President for women's issues policy (2017–2021) and daughter of Donald Trump
- David Urban, Chair of the American Battle Monuments Commission (2018–2021)
- Seema Verma, Administrator of the Centers for Medicare & Medicaid Services (2017–2021)
- Robert Wilkie, U.S. Secretary of Veterans Affairs (2018–2021) and Under Secretary of Defense for Personnel and Readiness (2017–2018)

== Former federal executive officials ==
=== Vice presidents ===
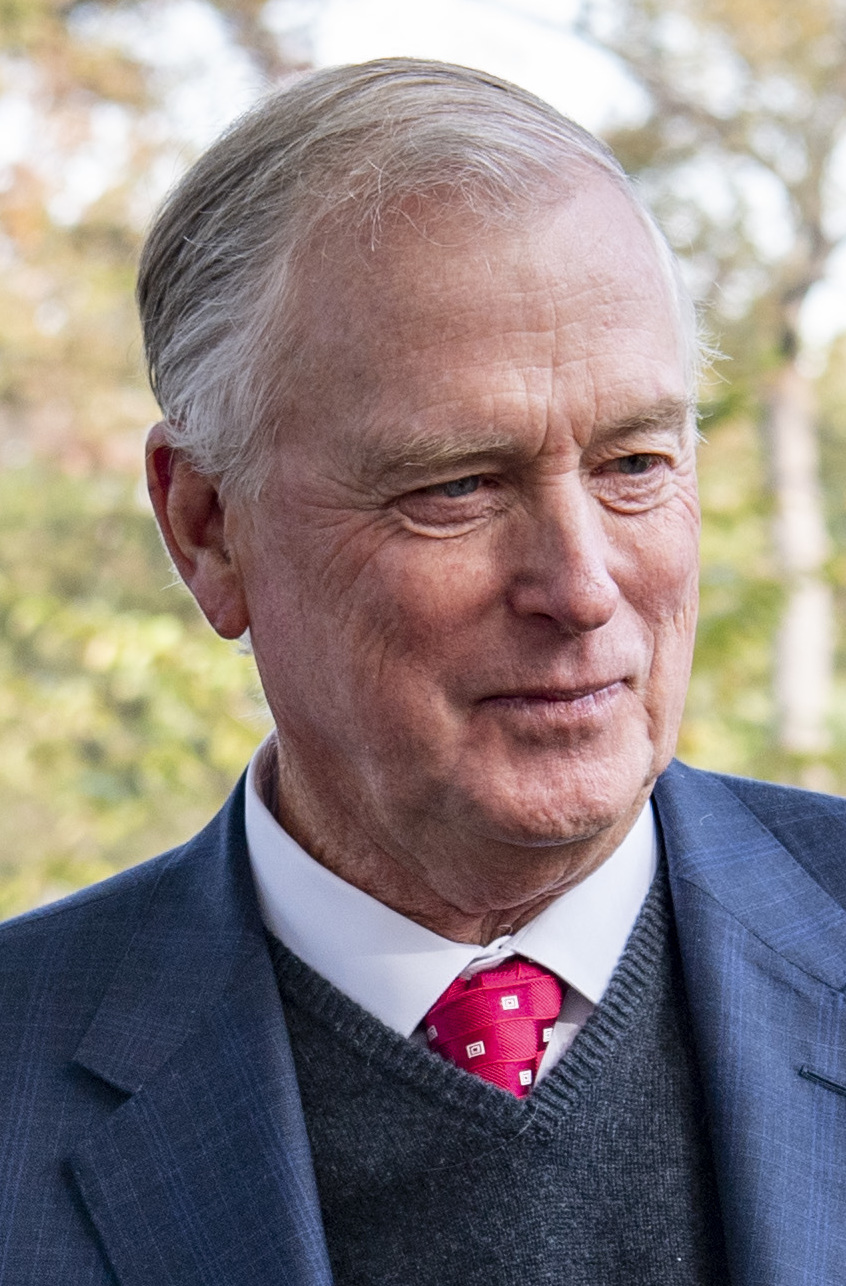
Dan Quayle

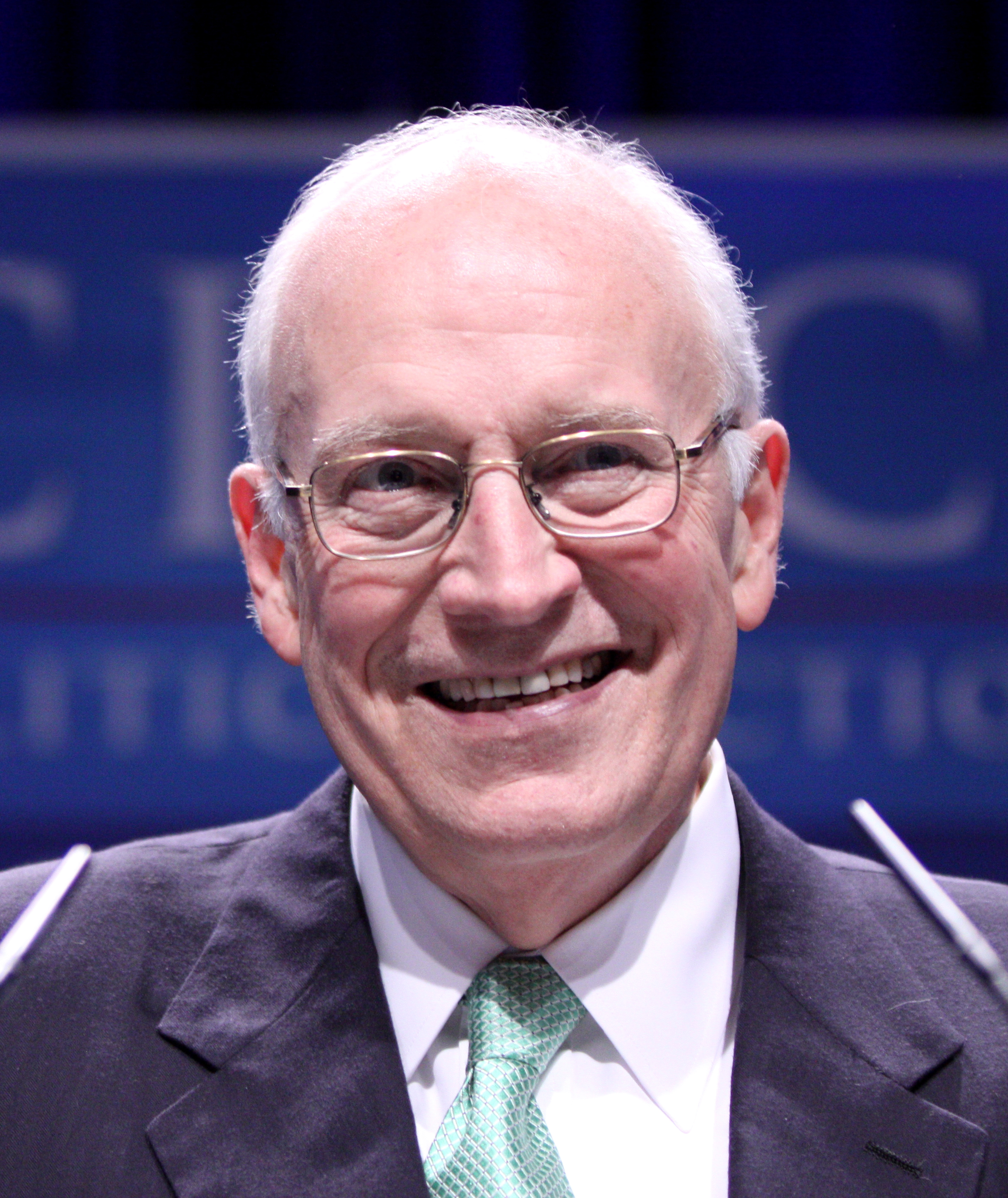
Dick Cheney

- Dan Quayle, 44th Vice President of the United States (1989–1993), U.S. Senator from Indiana (1981–1989), U.S. Representative from IN-04 (1977–1981)
- Dick Cheney, 46th Vice President of the United States (2001–2009), 17th United States Secretary of Defense (1989–1993), U.S. Representative from WY-AL (1979–1989), White House Chief of Staff (1975–1977)

=== Cabinet-level officials ===
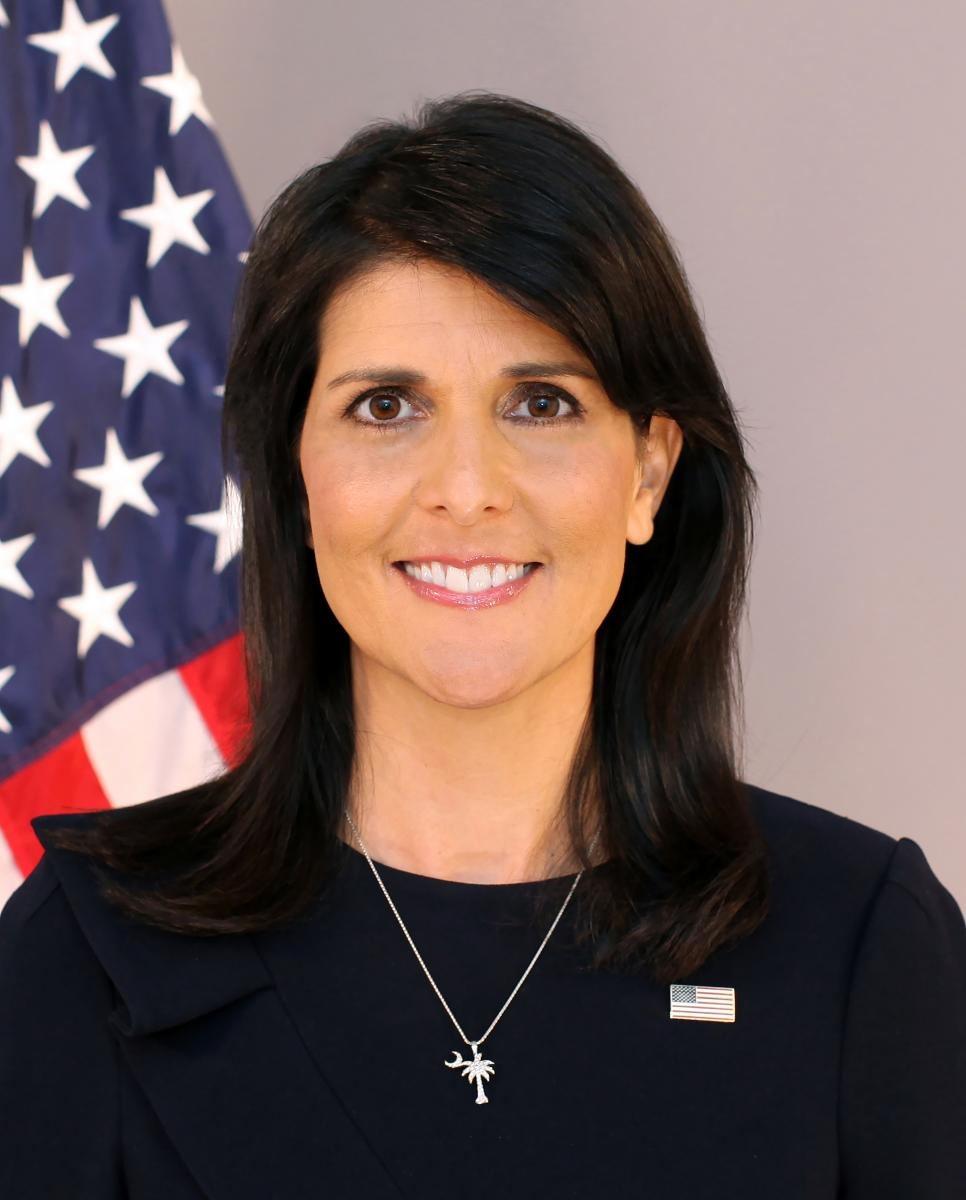
Nikki Haley

- James Baker, White House Chief of Staff (1981–1985, 1992–1993), U.S. Secretary of State (1989–1992), U.S. Secretary of the Treasury (1985–1988)
- Nikki Haley, U.S. Ambassador to the United Nations (2017–2018), Governor of South Carolina (2011–2017)
- Linda McMahon, former president and CEO of World Wrestling Entertainment, 25th Administrator of the Small Business Administration (2017–2019)
- Edwin Meese, U.S. Attorney General (1985–1988), Counselor to the President (1981–1985)
- Jim Nicholson, U.S. Secretary of Veterans Affairs (2005–2007)
- Rick Perry, U.S. Secretary of Energy (2017–2019) and Governor of Texas (2000–2015)
- Reince Priebus, White House Chief of Staff (2017) and Chair of the Republican National Committee (2011–2017)
- Anthony Principi, U.S. Secretary of Veterans Affairs (2001–2005) and U.S. Deputy Secretary of Veterans Affairs (1989–1992)
- Jeff Sessions, U.S. Attorney General (2017–2018), U.S. Senator from Alabama (1997–2017), 44th Attorney General of Alabama (1995–1997), U.S. Attorney for the Southern District of Alabama (1981–1993)
- Tommy Thompson, U.S. Secretary of Health and Human Services (2001–2005) and Governor of Wisconsin (1987–2001)
- Matthew Whitaker, Acting U.S. Attorney General (2018–2019) and U.S. Attorney of the Southern District of Iowa (2004–2009)

=== White House officials ===
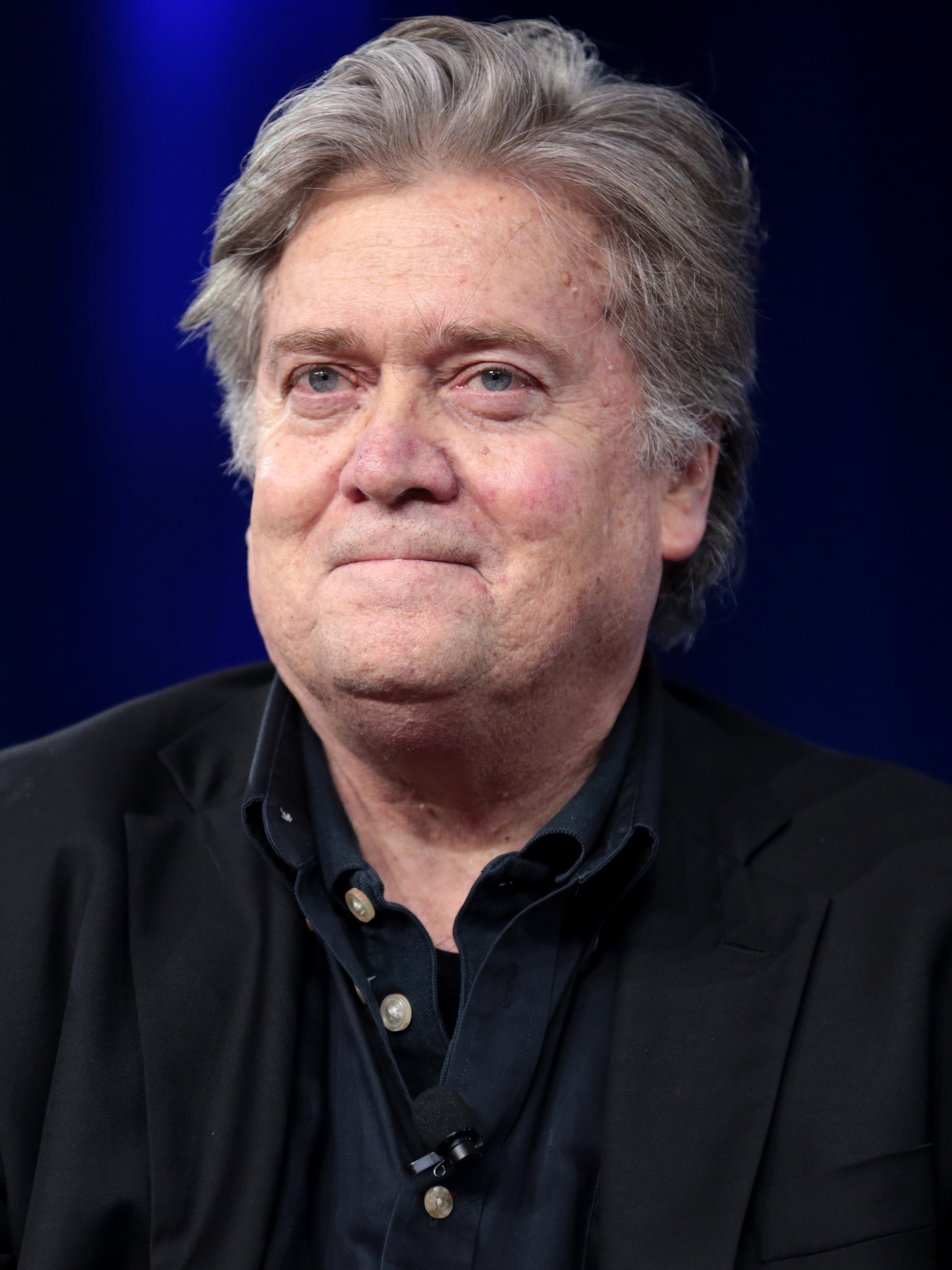
Steve Bannon

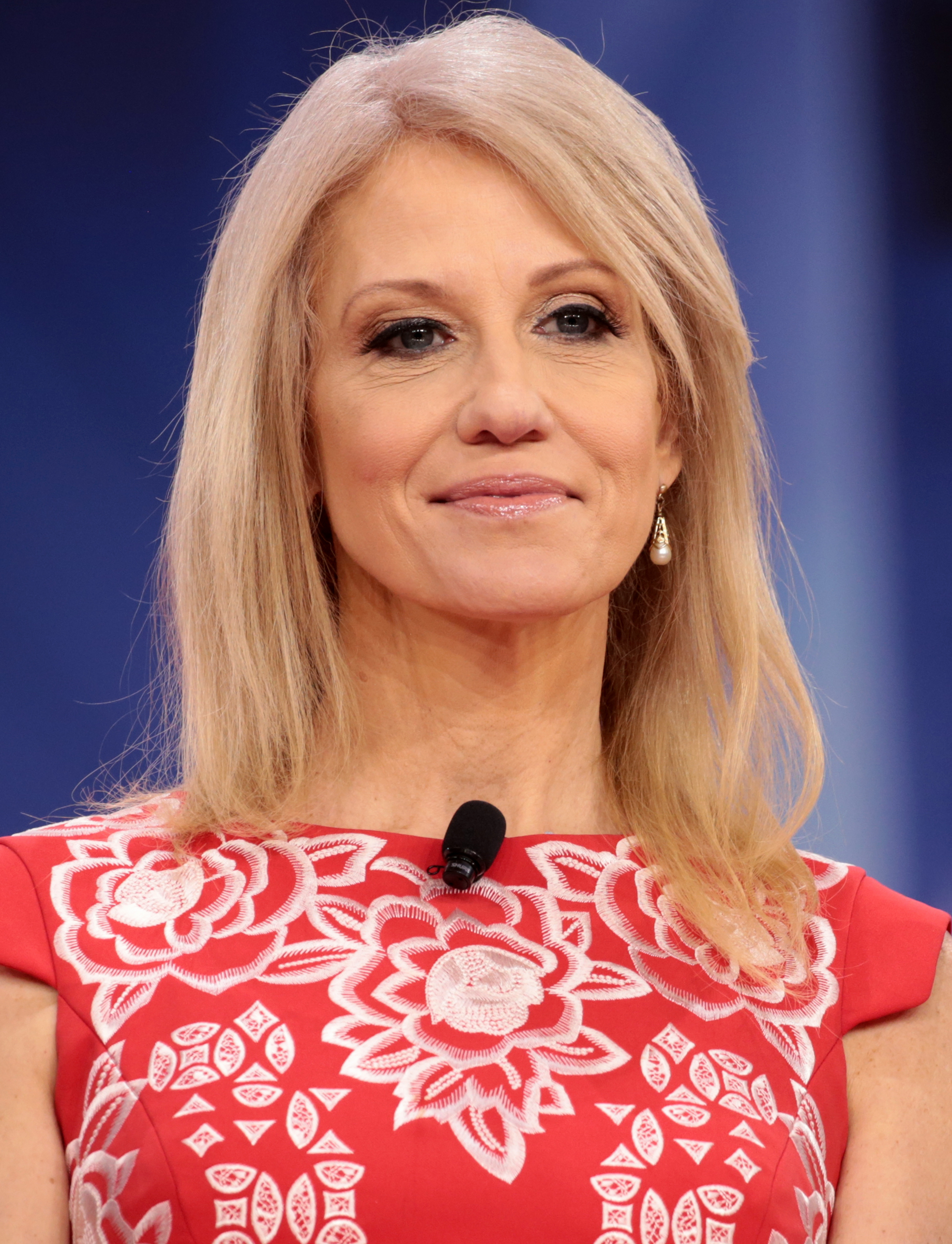
Kellyanne Conway

- Michael Anton, Deputy Assistant to the President for Strategic Communications (2017–2018)
- Steve Bannon, White House Chief Strategist (2017)
- Pat Buchanan, White House Communications Director (1985–1987)
- Justin Clark, Director of Public Liaison (2018) and Director of Intergovernmental Affairs (2017–2018)
- Kellyanne Conway, Counselor to the President (2017–2020)
- Boris Epshteyn, White House Assistant Director of Communications for Surrogate Operations (2017)
- Ari Fleischer, White House Press Secretary (2001–2003)
- Daniel Gade, associate director of the Domestic Policy Council (2007–2008) and retired U.S. Army lieutenant colonel
- Hogan Gidley, White House Deputy Press Secretary (2019–2020)
- George Gigicios, White House Director of Scheduling and Advance (2017)
- Ronny Jackson, Chief Medical Advisor to the President (2019), Physician to the President (2013–2018), retired U.S. Navy rear admiral and U.S. Representative from TX-13 (2021–present)
- John McEntee, Personal Aide to the President (2017–2018)
- Don McGahn, White House Counsel (2017–2018) and Chair of the Federal Election Commission (2008)
- David McIntosh, Director of the Domestic Policy Council (1987–1988) and U.S. Representative from IN-02 (1995–2001)
- Steve Munisteri, Director of the Office of Public Liaison (2018–2019) and Chair of the Texas Republican Party (2010–2015)
- John Poindexter, National Security Advisor (1985–1986), Deputy National Security Advisor (1983–1985) and retired U.S. Navy vice admiral
- Ed Rollins, Deputy Assistant to the President for Political Affairs (1980–81), Assistant to the President for Political Affairs (1981–83), Director of the Office of Political Affairs (1981–83) and Assistant to the President for Political and Governmental Affairs (1985)
- Mike Roman, Special Assistant to the President and Director of Special Projects and Research (2017–2018)
- Karl Rove, White House Deputy Chief of Staff (2005–2007)
- Sarah Huckabee Sanders, White House Press Secretary (2017–2019)
- Matt Schlapp, White House Director of Political Affairs (2003–2005), political activist, lobbyist, chairman of the American Conservative Union
- Mercedes Schlapp, White House Director of Strategic Communications (2017–2019)
- Bill Shine, White House Communications Director (2017–2019) and White House Deputy Chief of Staff for Communications (2018–2019)
- Sean Spicer, White House Press Secretary (2017) and White House Communications Director (2017)
- Bill Stepien, White House Director of Political Affairs (2017–2018)
- Katie Walsh, White House Deputy Chief of Staff (2017)

=== Executive office officials ===
- Nick Ayers, Chief of Staff to the Vice President (2017–2019)
- Gary Bauer, Assistant to the President for Policy Development (1987–1988), United States Under Secretary of Education (1985–1987) and United States Deputy Under Secretary of Education for Planning and Budget (1982–1985)
- Fred Fleitz, Chief of Staff and Executive Secretary of the National Security Council (2018)
- Sebastian Gorka, Deputy Assistant to the President (2017)
- Marc Lotter, Press Secretary to the Vice President (2017)
- Mary Matalin, Assistant to the President and Counsel to the Vice President (2001–2002)
- K.T. McFarland, Deputy National Security Advisor (2017)
- James C. Miller III, Director of the Office of Management and Budget (1985–1988)
- David Safavian, Administrator for Federal Procurement Policy (2004–2005)
- Stephen J. Yates, Deputy National Security Advisor to the Vice President (2001–2005) and Chair of Idaho Republican Party (2014–2017)

=== Department of defense officials ===
- Jed Babbin, Deputy Under Secretary of Defense for Acquisition Planning (1990–1991)
- William G. Boykin, Deputy Under Secretary of Defense for Intelligence (2002–2007), retired U.S. Army lieutenant general and vice president of Family Research Council
- Richard E. Brown, Assistant Vice Chief of Staff of the United States Air Force (2004) and retired U.S. Air Force lieutenant general
- Thomas Carter, Deputy Assistant Secretary of Defense for Legislative Affairs (1989–1990) and retired U.S. Air Force major general
- Jim Courter, Chair of the Defense Base Closure and Realignment Commission (1991–1994) and U.S Representative from NJ-12 (1983–1991) and NJ-13 (1979–1983)
- Michael Doran, Deputy Assistant Secretary for Public Diplomacy (2007–2008)
- Gordon England, Acting U.S. Secretary of Defense (2009), U.S. Deputy Secretary of Defense (2005–2009) and U.S. Secretary of the Navy (2001–2003, 2003–2006)
- Jay Garner, Director of the Office for Reconstruction and Humanitarian Assistance (2003) and retired U.S. Army lieutenant general (Democrat)
- Timothy F. Ghormley, Inspector General of the U.S. Marines Corp (1999–2001) and retired U.S. Marine Corps major general
- Stan Green, Inspector General of the U.S. Army (2005–2008) and retired U.S. Army lieutenant general
- Henry J. Hatch, Chief of Engineers (1988–1992) and retired U.S. Army lieutenant general
- Thomas Hayward, Chief of Naval Operations (1978–1982) and retired U.S. Navy admiral
- Dennis Hejlik, Commander of the United States Marine Forces Special Operations Command (2006–2008) and retired U.S. Marine Corps lieutenant general
- Van Hipp Jr, Deputy Assistant Secretary of the Army (Reserve Forces and Mobilization) (1990–1993) and Chair of the South Carolina Republican Party (1987–1989)
- Gerald L. Hoewing, Chief of Naval Personnel (2002–2005) and retired U.S. Navy vice admiral
- William K. James, Director of the Defense Mapping Agency (1990–1993) and retired U.S. Air Force major general
- Jerome Johnson, Vice Chief of Naval Operations (1990–1992) and retired U.S. Navy admiral
- Jon C. Kreitz, deputy director for Operations of the Defense POW/MIA Accounting Agency (2015–2019) and retired U.S. Navy rear admiral
- Ty McCoy, Assistant Secretary of the Air Force (Manpower & Reserve Affairs) (1981–1988)
- William A. Navas Jr, Assistant Secretary of the Navy (Manpower and Reserve Affairs) (2001–2008) and retired U.S. Army major general
- Raymund E. O'Mara, Director of the Defense Mapping Agency (1993–1994) retired U.S. Air Force major general
- Garry L. Parks, Deputy Commandant for Manpower and Reserve Affairs (2001–2004) and retired U.S. Marine Corps lieutenant general
- Marc Pelaez, Chief of Naval Research (1993–1996) and retired U.S. Navy rear admiral
- Richard A. Scholtes, Commander of the Joint Special Operations Command (1980–1984) and retired U.S. Army major general
- Leighton W. Smith Jr, Deputy Chief of Naval Operations for Plans, Policy and Operations (1991–1994) and retired U.S. Navy admiral
- Robert Spalding, Defense Attaché to China (2016–2017), Senior Director for Strategic Planning (2017–2018) and retired U.S. Air Force brigadier general
- James N. Stewart, Under Secretary of Defense for Personnel and Readiness (2018–2019), Assistant Secretary of Defense for Manpower and Reserve Affairs (2018–2019), and retired U.S. Air Force major general
- Edward Straw, Director of the Defense Logistics Agency (1992–1996) and retired U.S. Navy vice admiral
- Steven A. White, Chief of Naval Material (1983–1985) and retired U.S. Navy admiral
- Nils Ronald Thunman, Deputy Chief of Naval Operations for Submarine Warfare (1981–1985) and retired U.S. Navy vice admiral
- Michael W. Wooley, Commander of the Air Force Special Operations Command (2004–2007) and retired U.S. Air Force lieutenant general
- Garland P. Wright, deputy director of the Defense Threat Reduction Agency (2010–2012) and retired U.S. Navy rear admiral
- Michael Wynne, Secretary of the Air Force (2005–2008)

=== Department of state officials and US ambassadaors ===
- Robert I. Blau, Chargé d'Affaires ad interim to El Salvador (2009–2010)
- Rudy Boschwitz, United States Ambassador to the United Nations Commission on Human Rights (2005–2006) and U.S. Senator from Minnesota (1978–1991)
- Terry Branstad, U.S. Ambassador to China (2017–2020) and Governor of Iowa (1983–1999, 2011–2017)
- Christopher Burnham, Under Secretary of State for Management (2005) and Under Secretary General of the United Nations for Management (2005–2006)
- Robert B. Charles, Assistant Secretary of State for International Narcotics and Law Enforcement Affairs (2003–2005)
- Charles Glazer, U.S. Ambassador to El Salvador (2007–2009)
- Bill Hagerty, U.S. Ambassador to Japan (2017–2019) and U.S. Senator from Tennessee (2021–present)
- Brad Higgins, Assistant Secretary of State for Resource Management (2006–2009)
- Jon Huntsman Jr., U.S. Ambassador to Russia (2017–2019), U.S. Ambassador to China (2009–2011), Governor of Utah (2005–2009), 2012 Republican presidential candidate
- Alan Keyes, Assistant Secretary of State for International Organization Affairs (1985–1987)
- Douglas Kmiec, U.S. Ambassador to Malta (2009–2011) and the U.S. Assistant Attorney General to the Office of Legal Counsel (1988–1989)
- Brenda Lagrange Johnson, U.S. Ambassador to Jamaica (2005–2009)
- Mary Ourisman, U.S. Ambassador to Barbados (2006–2009), U.S. Ambassador to Saint Vincent and the Grenadines (2006–2009), U.S. Ambassador to Saint Lucia (2006–2009), U.S. Ambassador to Saint Kitts and Nevis (2006–2009), U.S. Ambassador to Antigua and Barbuda (2006–2009), U.S. Ambassador to Dominica (2006–2009), U.S. Ambassador to Grenada (2006–2009)
- Jeanne Phillips, U.S. Ambassador to the Organisation for Economic Co-operation and Development (2001–2003)
- Rodolphe M. Vallee, U.S. Ambassador to Slovakia (2005–2008)
- Ron Weiser, U.S. Ambassador to Slovakia (2001–2004)

=== Department of justice officials ===
- Bob Barr, U.S. Attorney for the Northern District of Georgia (1986–1990) and U.S. Representative from GA-07 (1995–2003) and Libertarian Party nominee for the 2008 presidential election
- Chris Christie, U.S. Attorney for the District of New Jersey (2002–2008), Governor of New Jersey (2010–2018) and Republican candidate for President in 2016
- Rudy Giuliani, United States Associate Attorney General (1981–1983) and Mayor of New York City, New York (1994–2001)
- Frank Keating, United States Associate Attorney General (1988–1990), United States Deputy Secretary of Housing and Urban Development (1992–1993) and Governor of Oklahoma (1995–2003)
- Tom Marino, U.S. Attorney for the Middle District of Pennsylvania (2002–2007) and U.S. Representative from PA-12 (2011–2019)
- Andrew C. McCarthy, Assistant U.S. Attorney for the Southern District of New York (1986–2003)
- Alfred S. Regnery, Deputy Assistant Attorney General of the Land and Natural Resources Division (1981–1986)

=== Department of homeland security officials ===
- Jay M. Cohen, Under Secretary of Homeland Security for Science and Technology (2006–2009) and retired U.S. Navy rear admiral
- Thomas Homan, Director of the U.S. Immigration and Customs Enforcement (2017–2018)
- Paul Yost Jr, Commandant of the Coast Guard (1986–1990) and retired U.S. Coast Guard admiral

=== Other federal officials ===
- James J. Carey, Chair of the Federal Maritime Commission (1989–1991) and retired U.S. Navy rear admiral
- Hal Daub, Chair of the Social Security Advisory Board (2002–2006), U.S. Representative from NE-02 (1981–1989) and Mayor of Omaha, Nebraska (1995–2001)
- Deecy Gray, Delegate to the United Nations (2019)
- Jason Greenblatt, Special Representative for International Negotiations (2017–2019)
- Kevin Hassett, Chair of the Council of Economic Advisers (2017–2019)
- John W. Nicholson, Under Secretary of Veterans Affairs for Memorial Affairs (2003–2005) and retired U.S. Army brigadier general
- Orson Swindle, Commissioner of the Federal Trade Commission (1997–2005)

=== Military personnel ===
==== Air Force ====
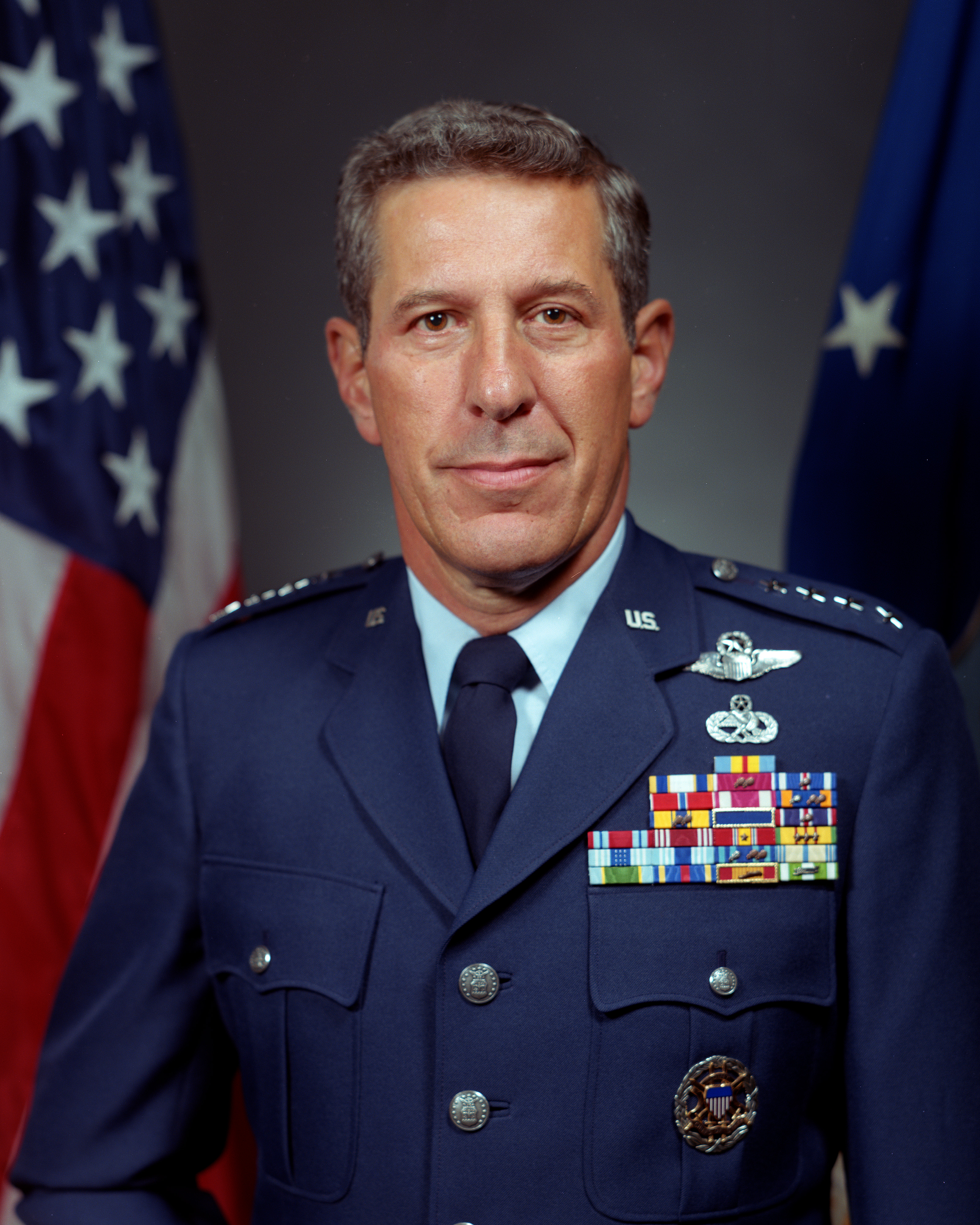
Alfred G. Hansen

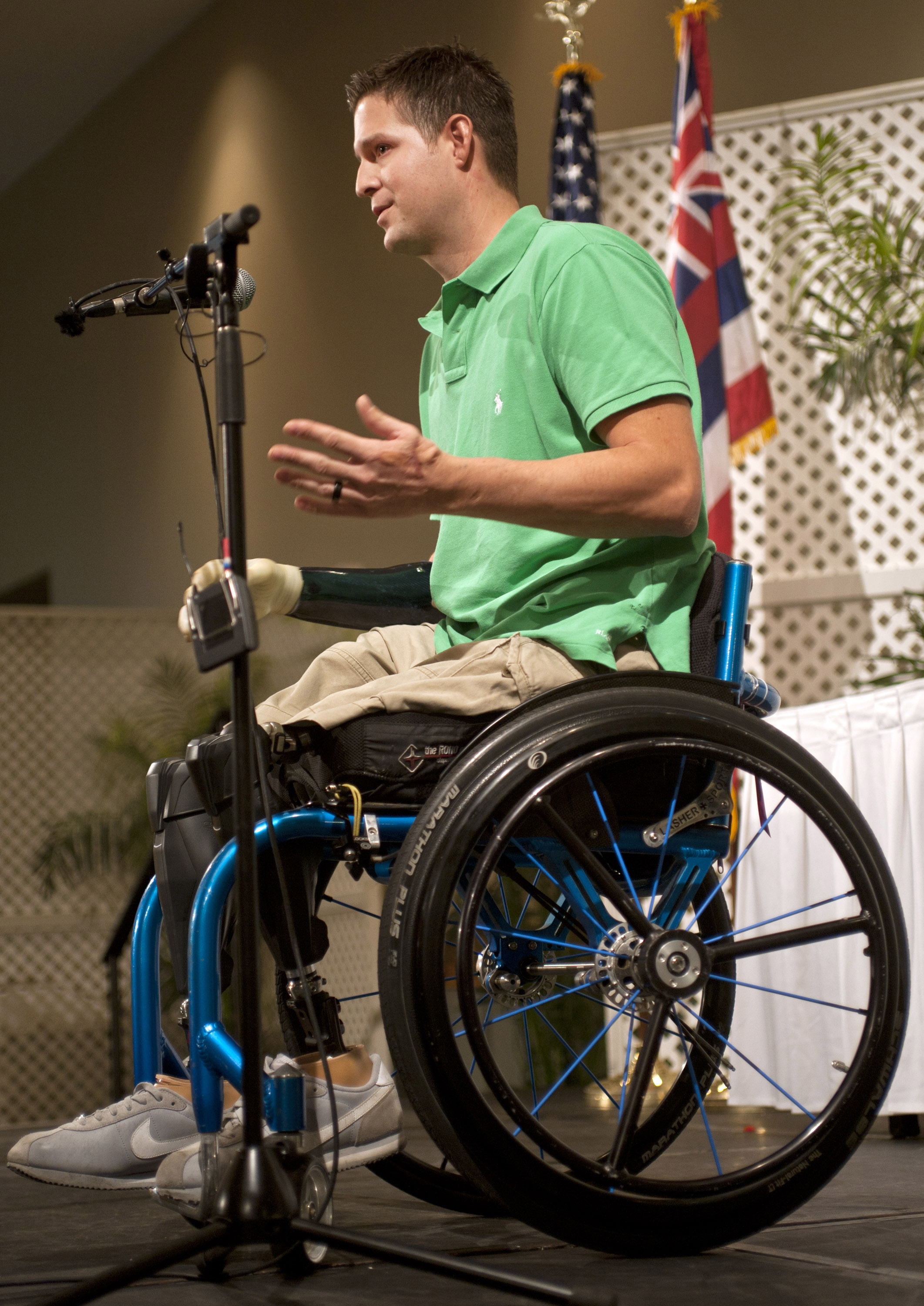
Brian Kolfage

- John R. Allen Jr, retired U.S. Air Force brigadier general
- John Closner, retired U.S. Air Force major general
- Sam Clovis, former U.S. Air Force officer, talk radio host, political figure
- Harold A. Fritz, Medal of Honor recipient and retired U.S. Air Force lieutenant colonel
- Alfred G. Hansen, retired U.S. Air Force general
- Timothy A. Kinnan, retired U.S. Air Force lieutenant general
- Brian Kolfage, U.S. Air Force veteran, founder of We Build the Wall
- John D. Logeman, retired U.S. Air Force major general
- William R. Looney III, retired U.S. Air Force general
- Thomas McInerney, retired U.S. Air Force lieutenant general
- Hans Mueh, retired U.S. Air Force brigadier general
- Robert C. Oaks, retired U.S. Air Force general
- Scott O'Grady, U.S. Air Force veteran
- August Pfluger, retired U.S. Air Force lieutenant colonel and U.S. Representative from TX-11 (2021–present)
- Nels Running, retired U.S. Air Force major general
- Richard Secord, retired U.S. Air Force major general
- Ellie G. Shuler Jr, retired U.S. Air Force lieutenant general
- Lance L. Smith, retired U.S. Air Force general
- William E. Thurman, retired U.S. Air Force lieutenant general
- Thomas C. Waskow, retired U.S. Air Force lieutenant general

==== Army ====
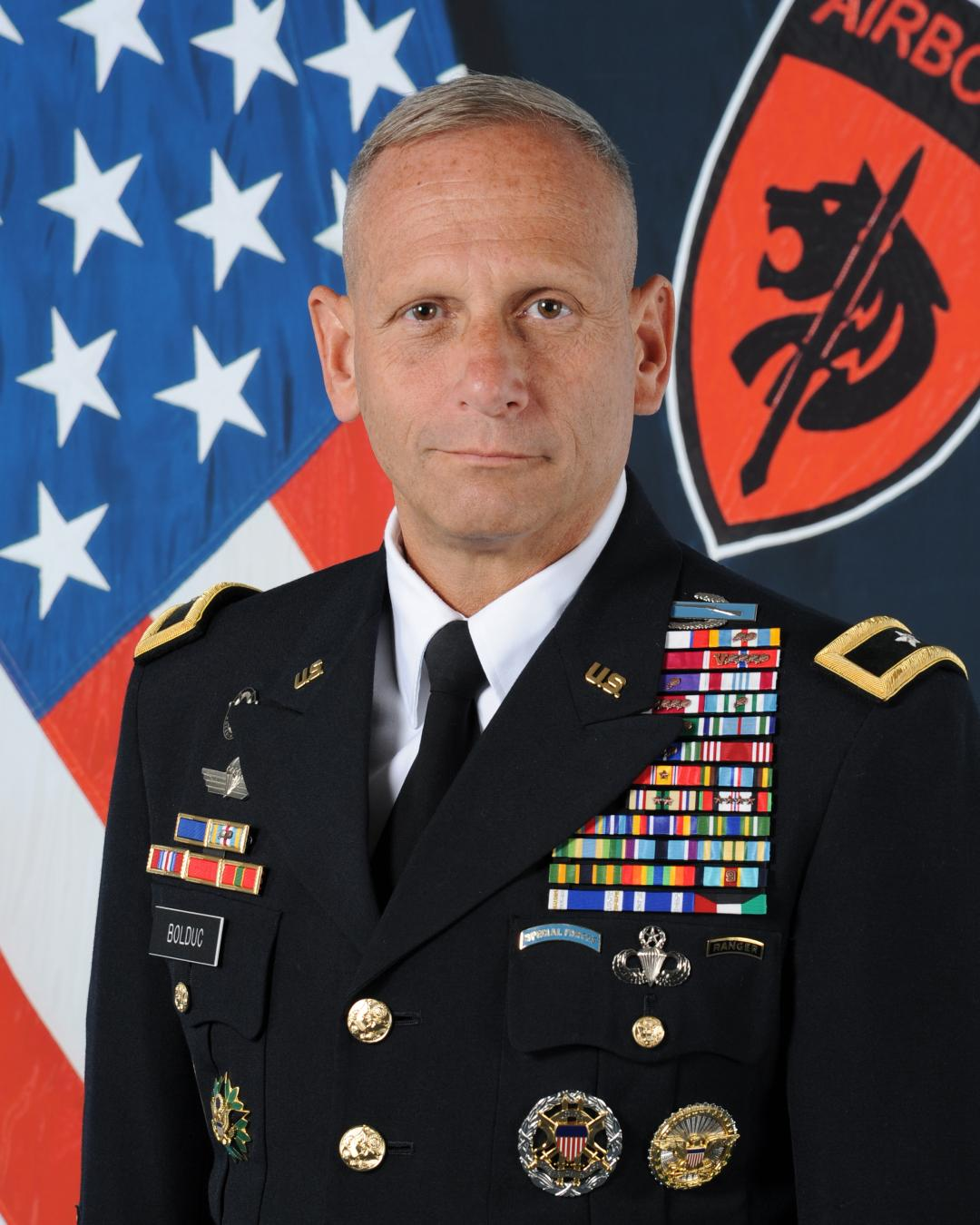
Donald Bolduc

- Gary B. Beikirch, Medal of Honor recipient and former U.S. Army soldier
- Burwell B. Bell III, retired U.S. Army general
- Stephen M. Bliss, retired U.S. Army brigadier general
- Donald C. Bolduc, retired U.S. Army brigadier general
- Patrick Henry Brady, Medal of Honor recipient and retired U.S. Army major general
- Mike Cernovich, former U.S. Army National Guard second lieutenant
- Sammy L. Davis, Medal of Honor recipient and retired U.S. Army soldier
- Robert F. Dees, retired U.S. Army major general
- Roger Donlon, Medal of Honor recipient and retired U.S. Army colonel
- Stacy Garrity, retired U.S. Army colonel and Pennsylvania State Treasurer (2021–present)
- Jeffrey Hammond, retired U.S. Army major general
- Gary L. Harrell, retired U.S. Army major general
- Bobby Henline, former U.S. Army soldier and stand-up comedian
- John E. James, U.S. Army veteran and the Republican nominee for the 2018 and 2020 United States Senate elections in Michigan
- James H. Johnson, retired U.S. Army lieutenant general
- Clint Lorance, former U.S. Army officer and convicted war criminal
- Ronald S. Magnum, retired U.S. Army brigadier general
- James McCloughan, Medal of Honor recipient and former U.S. Army combat medic
- Robert Martin Patterson, Medal of Honor recipient and retired U.S. Army command sergeant major
- Leroy Petry, Medal of Honor recipient and retired U.S. Army master sergeant
- Félix Rodríguez, retired U.S. Army Special Forces colonel
- Clint Romesha, Medal of Honor recipient and former U.S. Army soldier
- Anthony Shaffer, retired U.S. Army Reserve lieutenant colonel and President of London Center for Policy Research
- Alek Skarlatos, former U.S. Army National Guard soldier who thwarted a terrorist attack on a Thalys train
- Paul E. Vallely, retired U.S. Army major general
- Ronald L. Watts, retired U.S. Army lieutenant general
- Robert Wetzel, retired U.S. Army lieutenant general
- John W. Woodmansee, retired U.S. Army lieutenant general
- Walter H. Yates, retired U.S. Army major general
- Albert C. Zapanta, retired U.S. Army major general

==== Coast Guard ====
- Donald C. Thompson, retired U.S. Coast Guard vice admiral
- Howard Thorsen, retired U.S. Coast Guard vice admiral

==== Marine Corps ====
- Emil R. Bedard, retired U.S. Marine Corps lieutenant general
- Matthew T. Cooper, retired U.S. Marine Corps lieutenant general
- Sarah Deal, first female U.S. Marine Corps aviator
- Gene Deegan, retired U.S. Marine Corps major general
- John S. Grinalds, retired U.S. Marine Corps major general
- Earl B. Hailston, retired U.S. Marine Corps lieutenant general
- James Livingston, Medal of Honor recipient and retired U.S. Marine Corps major general
- Jarvis Lynch, retired U.S. Marine Corps major general
- Oliver North, retired U.S. Marine Corps lieutenant colonel, former member National Security Council
- Ronald G. Richard, retired U.S. Marine Corps major general
- Woody Williams, Medal of Honor recipient and retired U.S. Marine Corps warrant officer

==== Navy ====
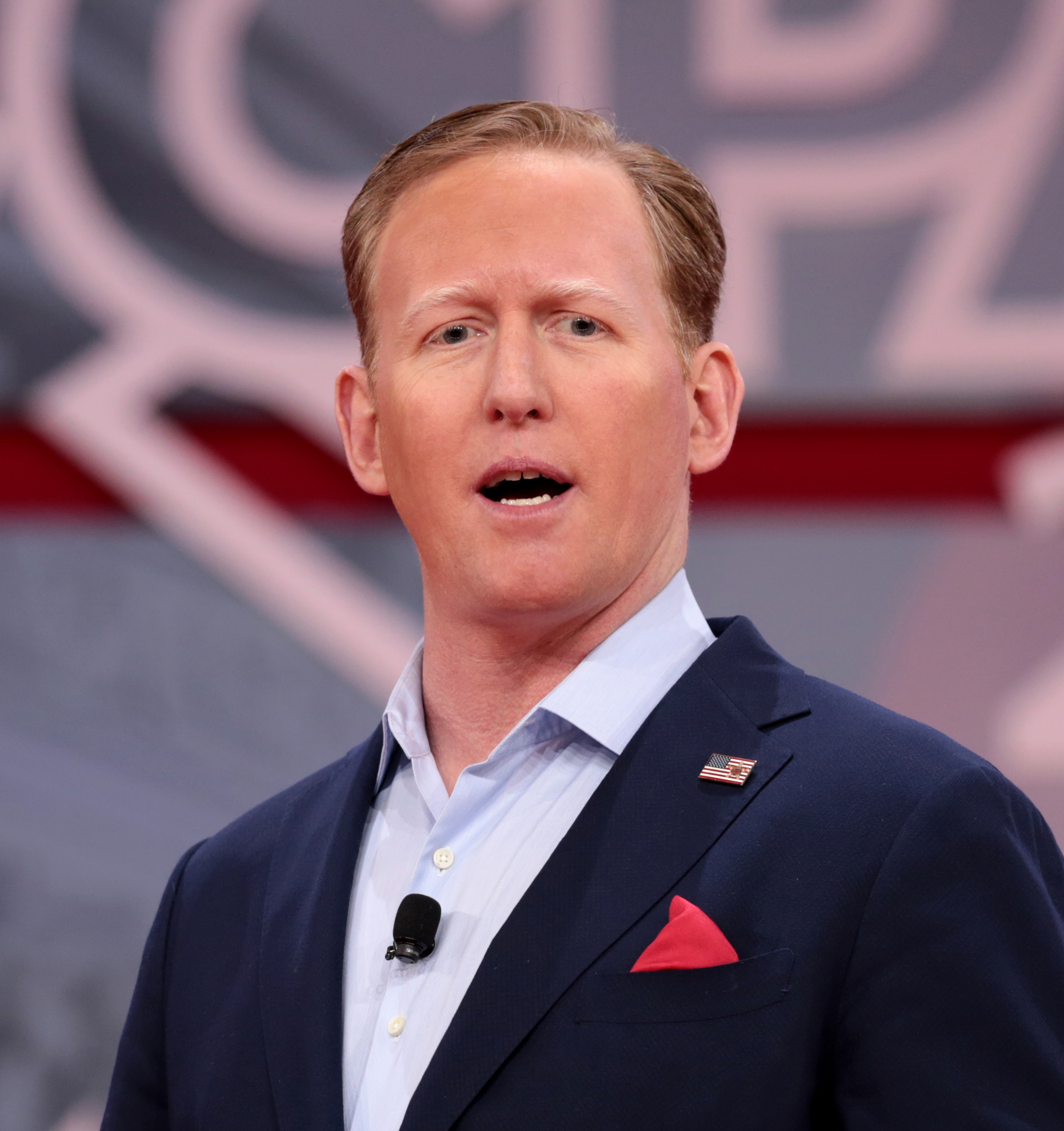
Robert J. O'Neill

- Edward S. Briggs, retired U.S. Navy vice admiral
- Mark Fitzgerald, retired U.S. Navy admiral
- Eddie Gallagher, former U.S. Navy SEAL and accused war criminal
- William J. Hancock, retired U.S. Navy vice admiral
- Gordon S. Holder, retired U.S. Navy vice admiral
- Robert J. O'Neill, former U.S. Navy SEAL who is believed to have killed Osama Bin Laden
- Robert H. Shumaker, retired U.S. Navy rear admiral
- Robert J. Spane, retired U.S. Navy vice admiral
- Michael E. Thornton, Medal of Honor recipient and retired U.S. Navy SEAL
- Jerry Unruh, retired U.S. Navy vice admiral
- Charles R. Kubic, Retired Rear Admiral

== U.S. senators ==
=== Current ===
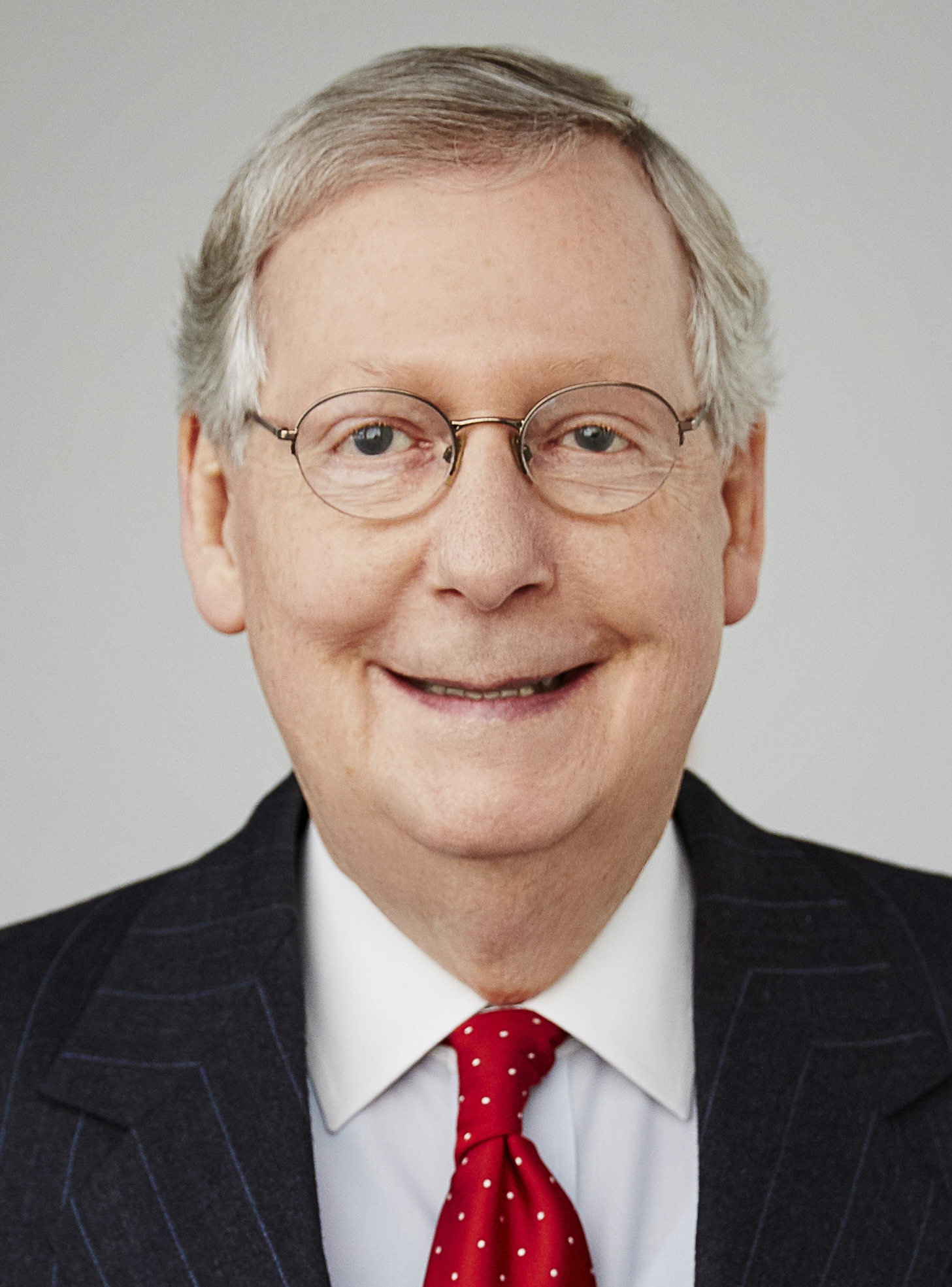
Mitch McConnell

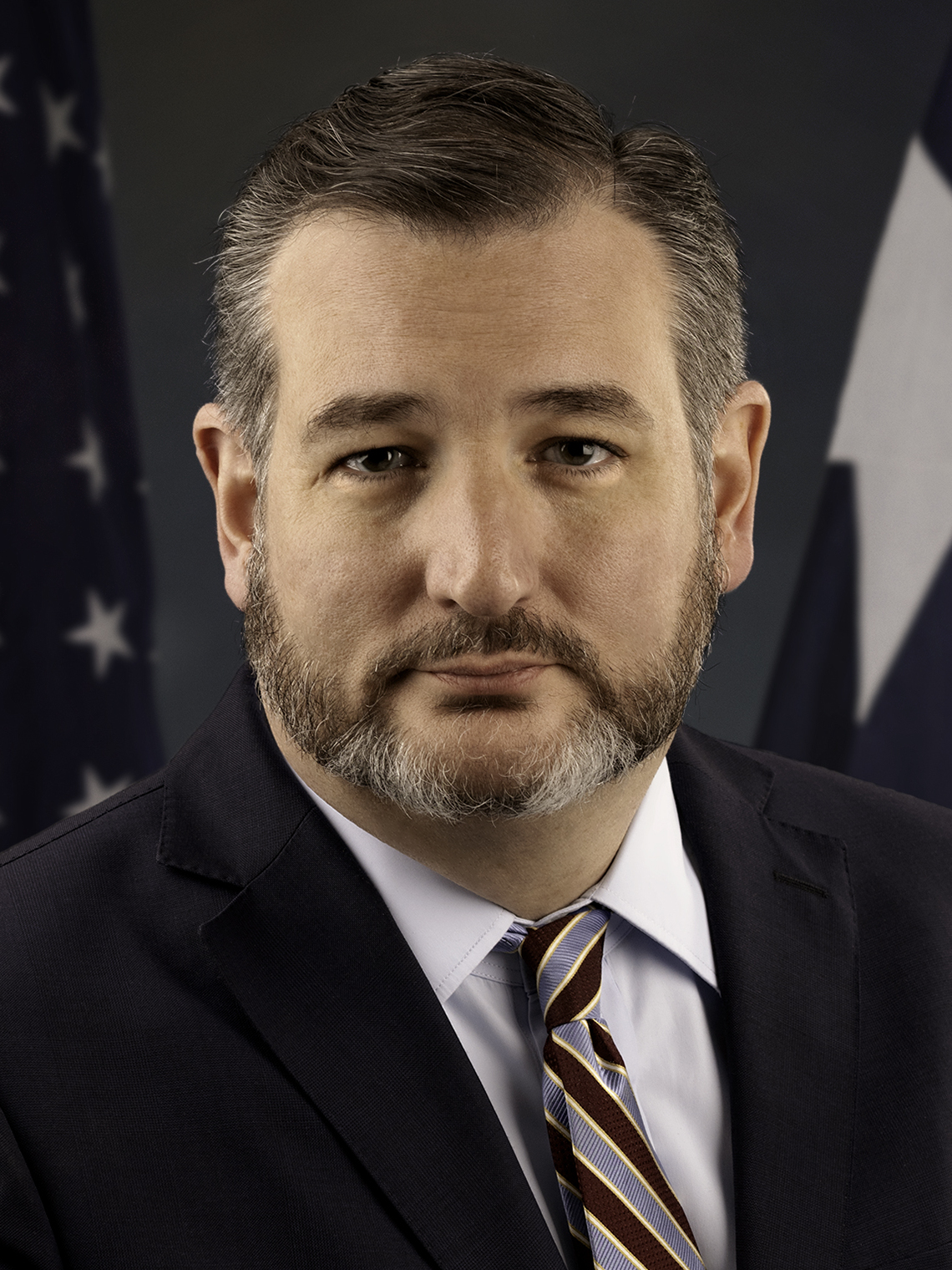
Ted Cruz

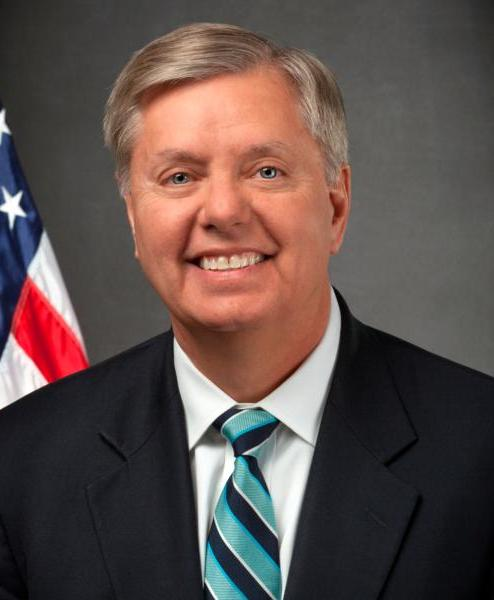
Lindsey Graham

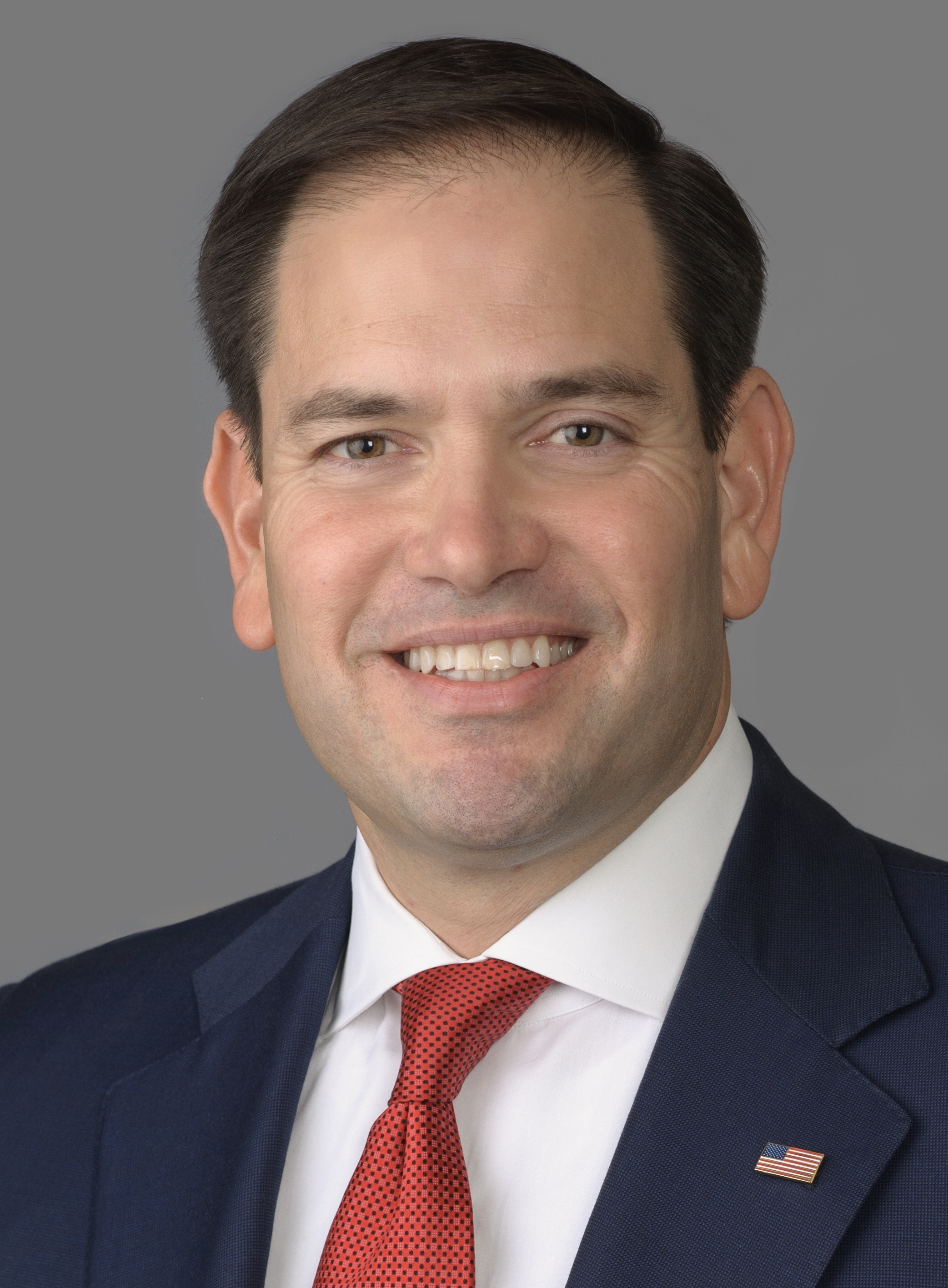
Marco Rubio

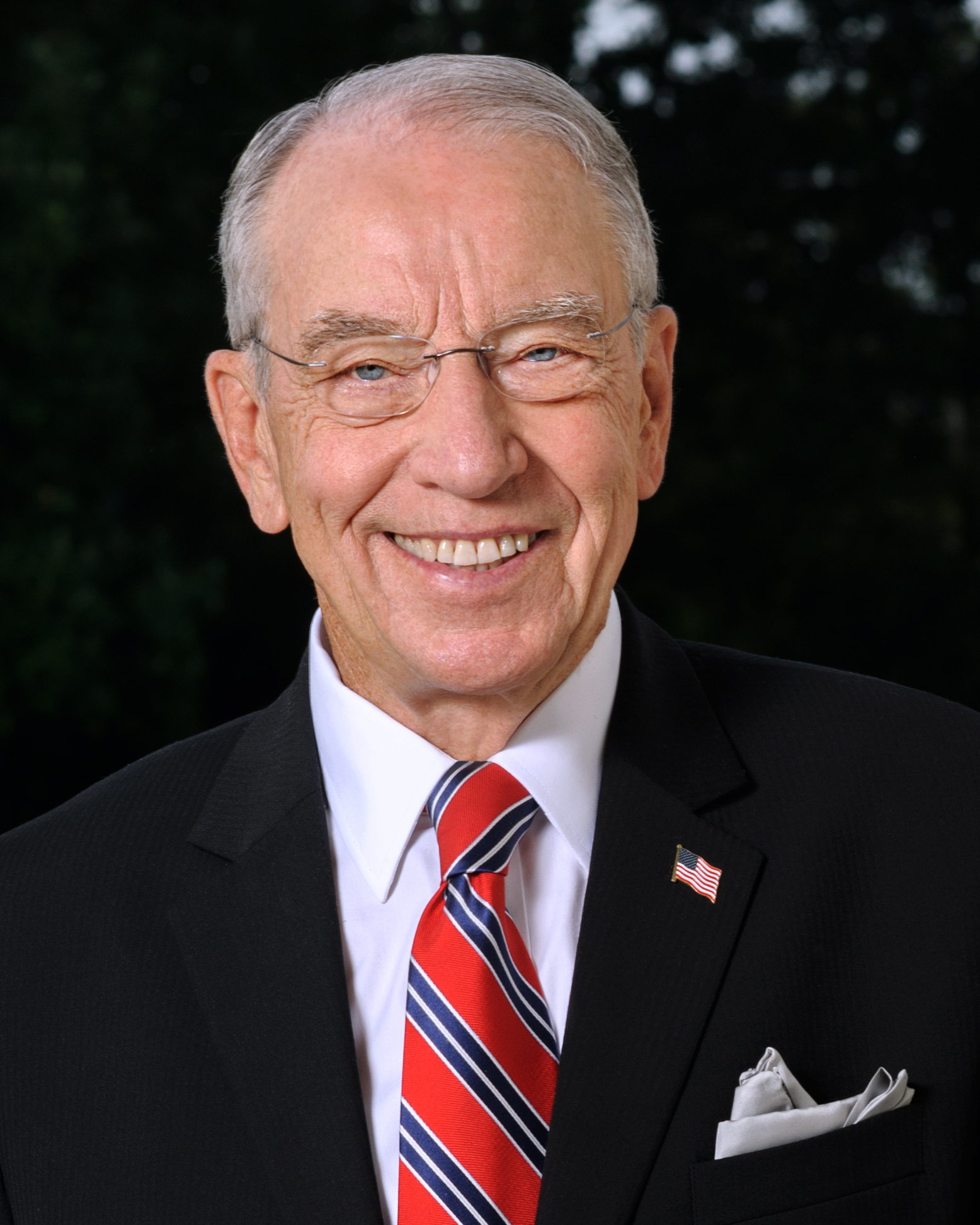
Chuck Grassley

- Lamar Alexander, U.S. Senator from Tennessee (2003–2021) and 45th Governor of Tennessee (1979–1987)
- John Barrasso, U.S. Senator from Wyoming (2007–present)
- Marsha Blackburn, U.S. Senator from Tennessee (2019–present)
- Roy Blunt, U.S. Senator from Missouri (2011–2023)
- John Boozman, U.S. Senator from Arkansas (2011–present)
- Richard Burr, U.S. Senator from North Carolina (2005–2023)
- Shelley Moore Capito, U.S. Senator from West Virginia (2015–present)
- Bill Cassidy, U.S. Senator from Louisiana (2015–present)
- John Cornyn, U.S. Senator from Texas (2002–present) and Chair of the Senate Narcotics Caucus (2019–2021)
- Tom Cotton, U.S. Senator from Arkansas (2015–present)
- Kevin Cramer, U.S. Senator from North Dakota (2019–present)
- Mike Crapo, U.S. Senator from Idaho (1999–present)
- Ted Cruz, U.S. Senator from Texas (2013–present)
- Steve Daines, U.S. Senator from Montana (2015–present) and U.S. Representative from MT-AL (2013–2015)
- Mike Enzi, U.S. Senator from Wyoming (1997–2021)
- Joni Ernst, U.S. Senator from Iowa (2015–present)
- Deb Fischer, U.S. Senator from Nebraska (2013–present)
- Zoraida Fonalledas, Shadow Senator from Puerto Rico (2017–2021)
- Cory Gardner, U.S. Senator from Colorado (2015–2021) and U.S Representative from CO-4 (2011–2015)
- Lindsey Graham, U.S. Senator from South Carolina (2003–2026), U.S. Representative from SC-3 (1995–2003) and candidate for president in 2016
- Chuck Grassley, U.S. Senator from Iowa and President pro tempore of the United States Senate (1981–present)
- Josh Hawley, U.S. Senator from Missouri (2019–present)
- Cindy Hyde-Smith, U.S. Senator from Mississippi (2018–present)
- Jim Inhofe, U.S. Senator from Oklahoma (1994–2023)
- Ron Johnson, U.S. Senator from Wisconsin (2011–present) and Chair of the Senate Homeland Security and Governmental Affairs Committee (2015–2021)
- John Kennedy, U.S. Senator from Louisiana (2017–present)
- James Lankford, U.S. Senator from Oklahoma (2015–present) and U.S. Representative from OK-5 (2011–2015)
- Mike Lee, U.S. Senator from Utah (2011–present)
- Kelly Loeffler, U.S. Senator from Georgia (2020–2021)
- Mitch McConnell, U.S. Senator from Kentucky (1985–present) and Senate Majority Leader (2015–2021)
- Martha McSally, U.S. Senator from Arizona (2019–2020) and U.S. Representative from AZ-02 (2015–2019)
- Rand Paul, U.S. Senator from Kentucky (2011–present)
- David Perdue, U.S. Senator from Georgia (2015–2021)
- Rob Portman, U.S. Senator from Ohio (2011–2023)
- Jim Risch, U.S. Senator from Idaho (2009–present)
- Mike Rounds, U.S. Senator from South Dakota (2015–present)
- Marco Rubio, U.S. Senator from Florida (2011–2025)
- Rick Scott, Governor of Florida (2011–2019), U.S. Senator from Florida (2019–present)
- Tim Scott, U.S. Senator from South Carolina (2013–present)
- Richard Shelby, U.S. Senator from Alabama (1987–2023)
- Dan Sullivan, U.S. Senator from Alaska (2015–present)
- John Thune, Senate Majority Whip (2019–2021) U.S. Senator from South Dakota (2005–present)
- Thom Tillis, U.S. Senator from North Carolina (2015–present)
- Pat Toomey, U.S. Senator from Pennsylvania (2011–2023)
- Roger Wicker, U.S. Senator from Mississippi (2007–present)

=== Former ===
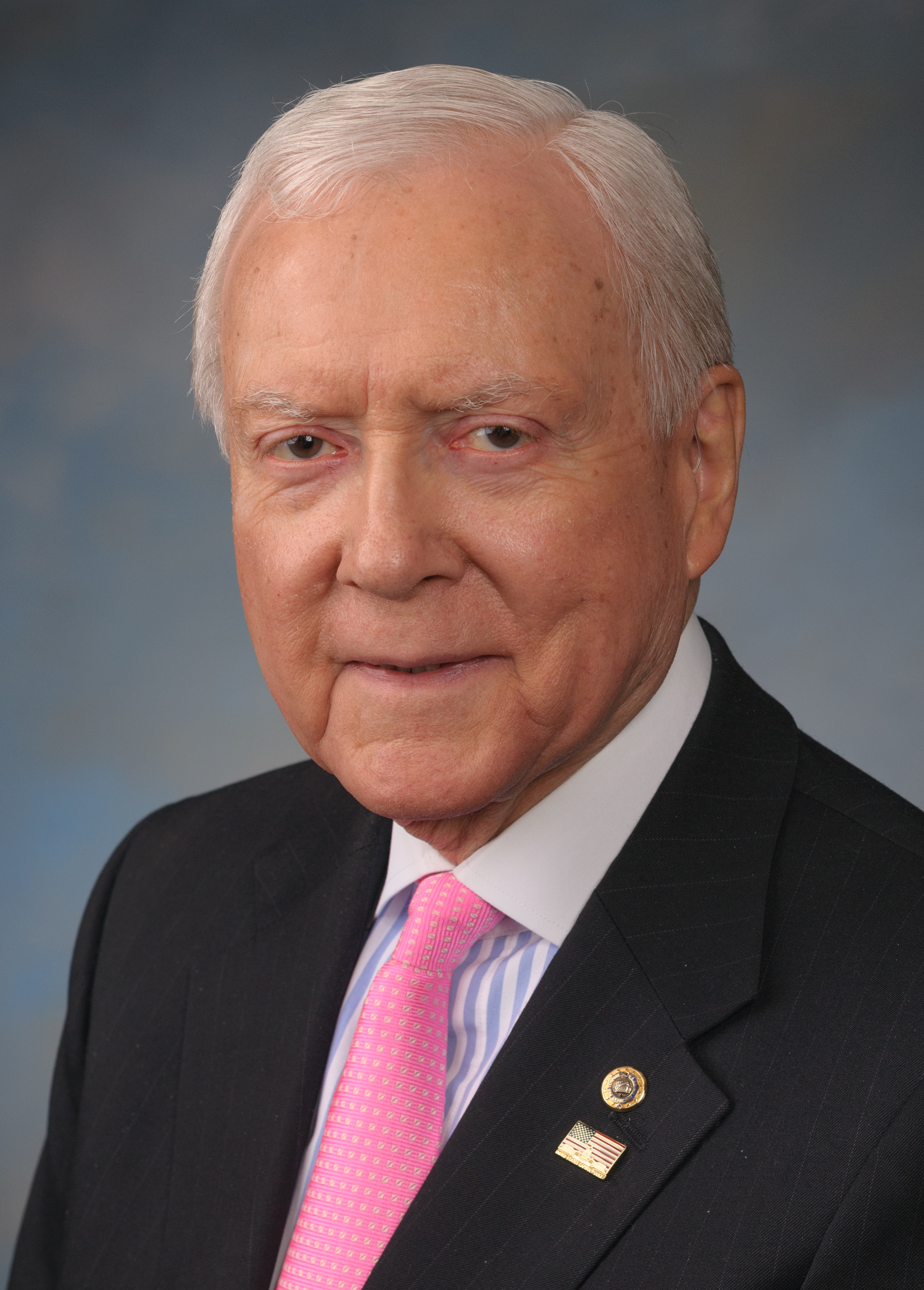
Orrin Hatch

Bob Dole

- Hank Brown, U.S. Senator from Colorado (1991–1997)
- Ben Nighthorse Campbell, U.S. Senator from Colorado (1993–2005) and U.S. Representative from CO-03 (1987–1993)
- Norm Coleman, U.S. Senator from Minnesota (2003–2009) and Mayor of St. Paul (1994–2002)
- Jim DeMint, U.S. Senator from South Carolina (2005–2013) and U.S. Representative from SC-04 (1999–2005)
- Bob Dole, U.S. Senator from Kansas (1969-1996) and Senate Majority Leader (1985-1987, 1995-1996), Republican Presidential Nominee in the 1996 U.S. Presidential Election
- Orrin Hatch, U.S. Senator from Utah and former president pro tempore of the United States Senate (1977–2019)
- Dean Heller, U.S. Senator from Nevada (2011–2019)
- Tim Hutchinson, U.S. Senator of Arkansas (1997–2003)
- Connie Mack III, U.S. Senator from Florida (1989–2001)
- Jim Talent, U.S. Senator from Missouri (2002–2007)
- Pete Wilson, U.S. Senator from California (1983–1991), Governor of California (1991–1999)

== U.S. representatives ==
=== Current ===
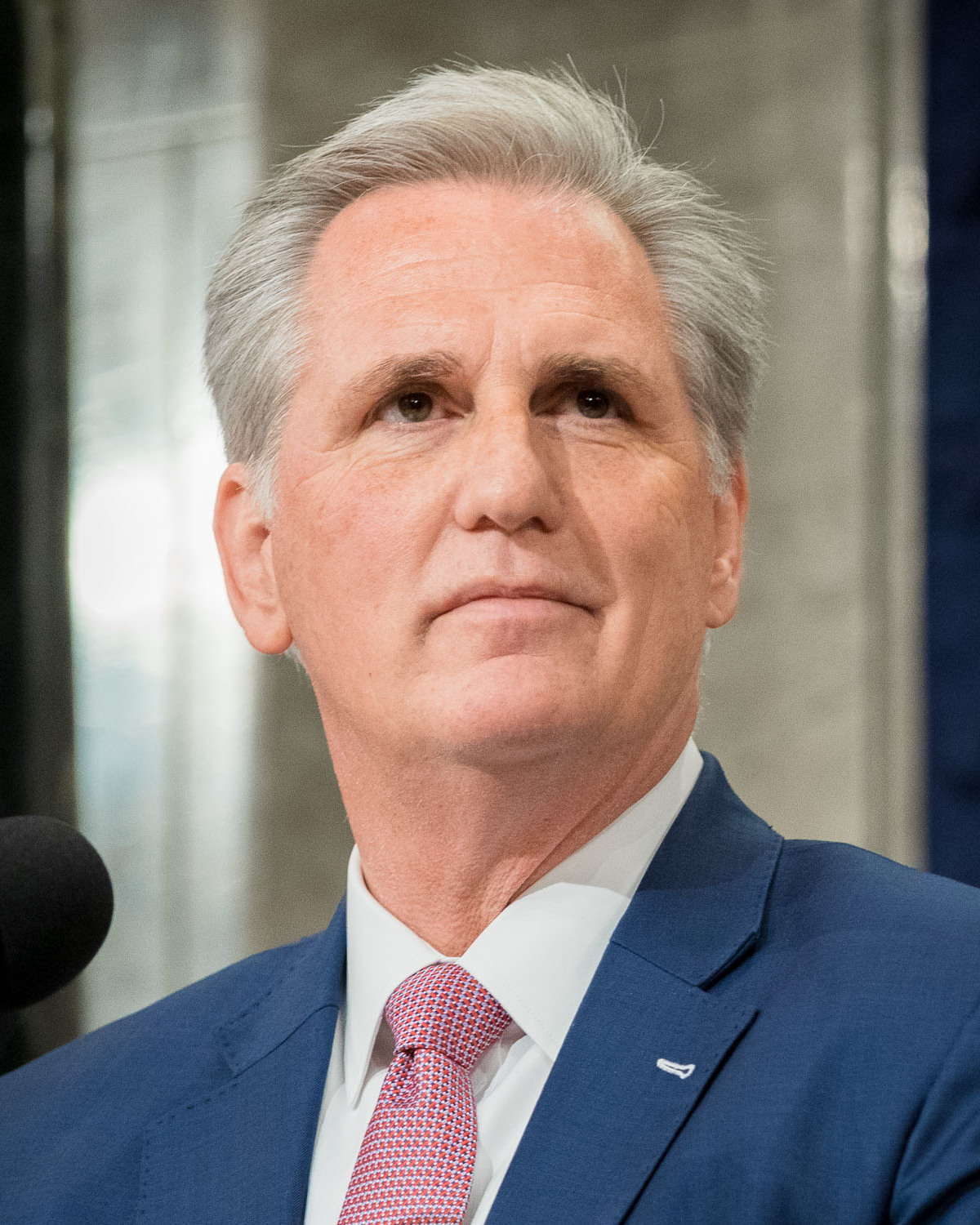
Kevin McCarthy

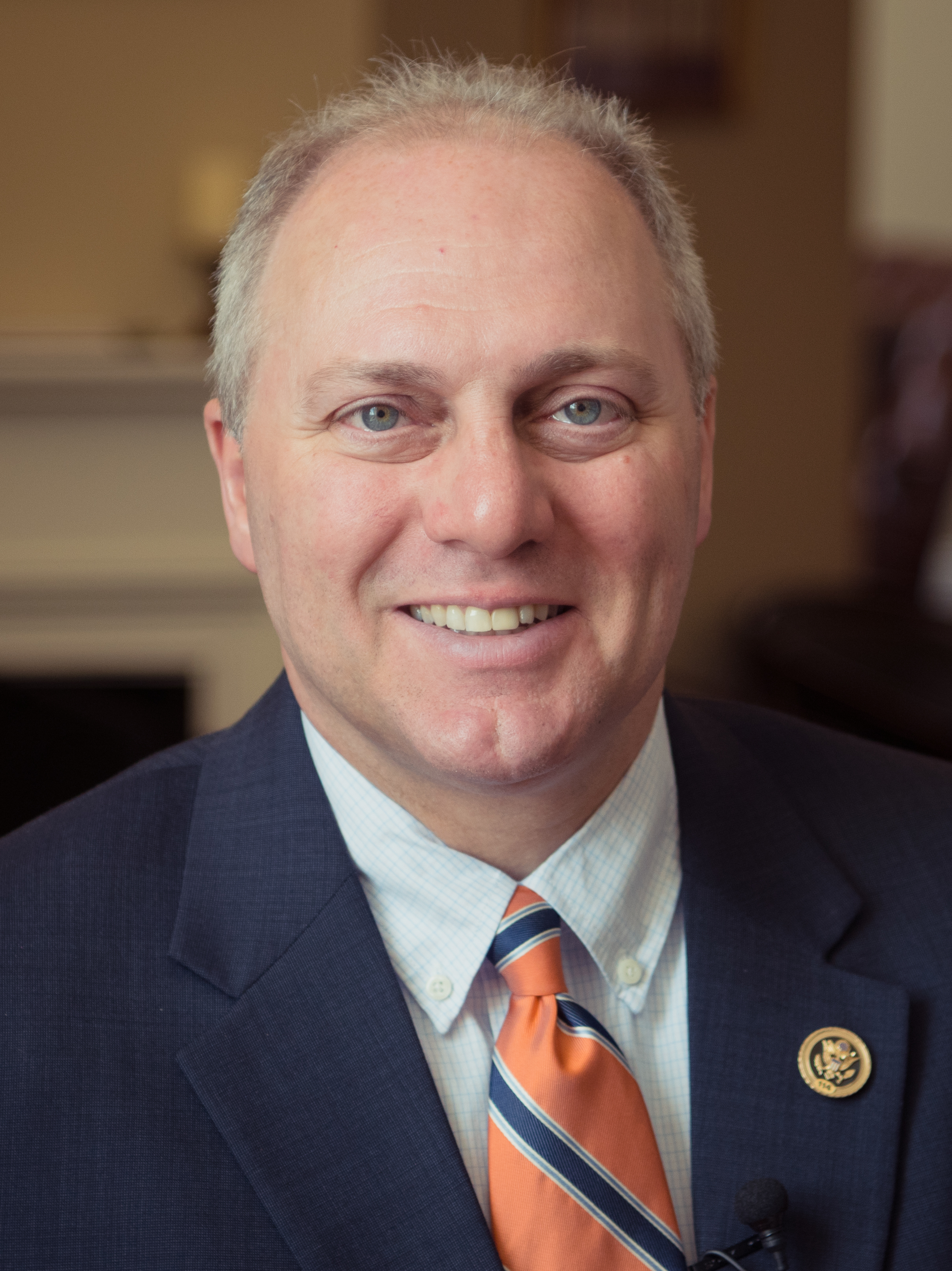
Steve Scalise

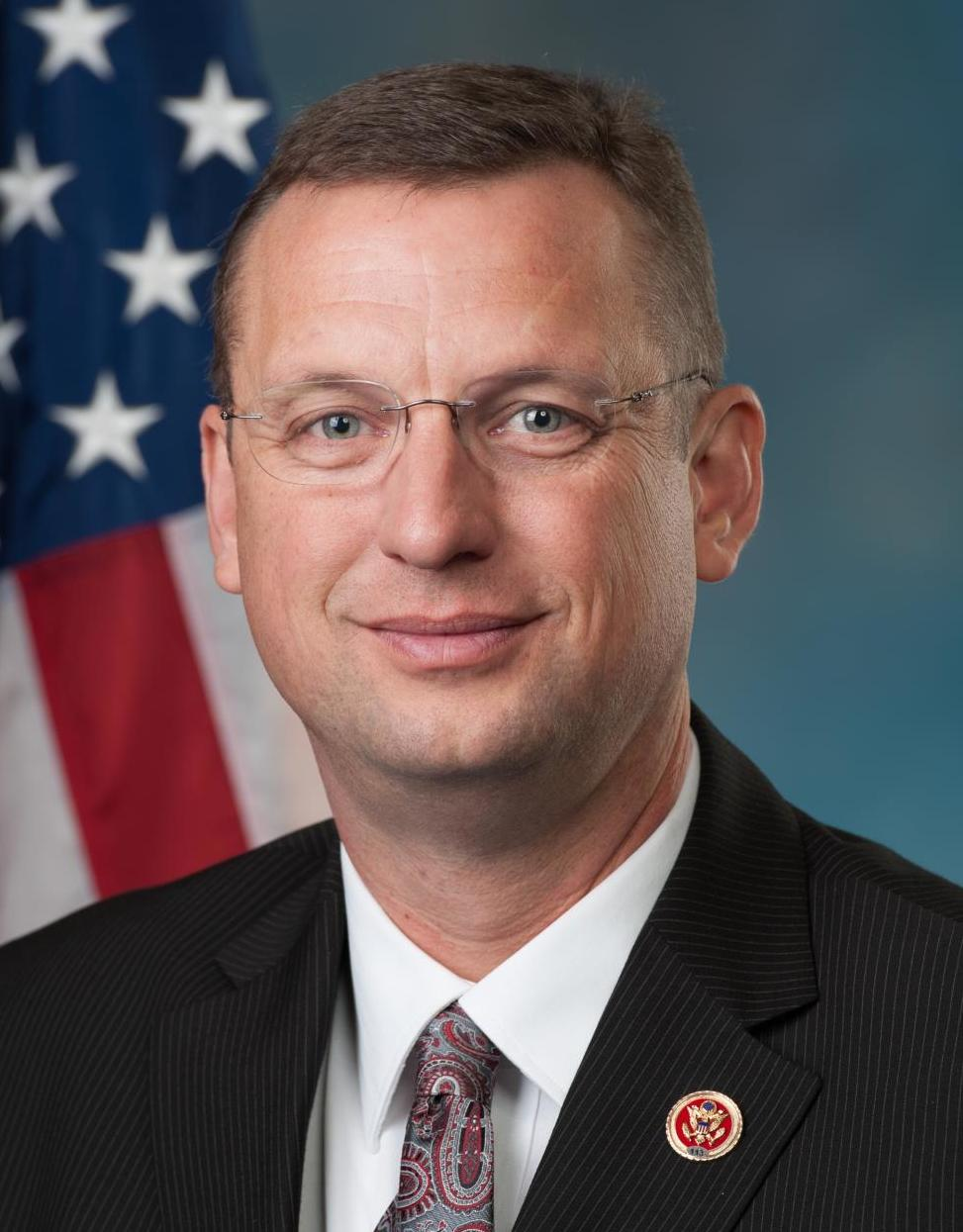
Doug Collins

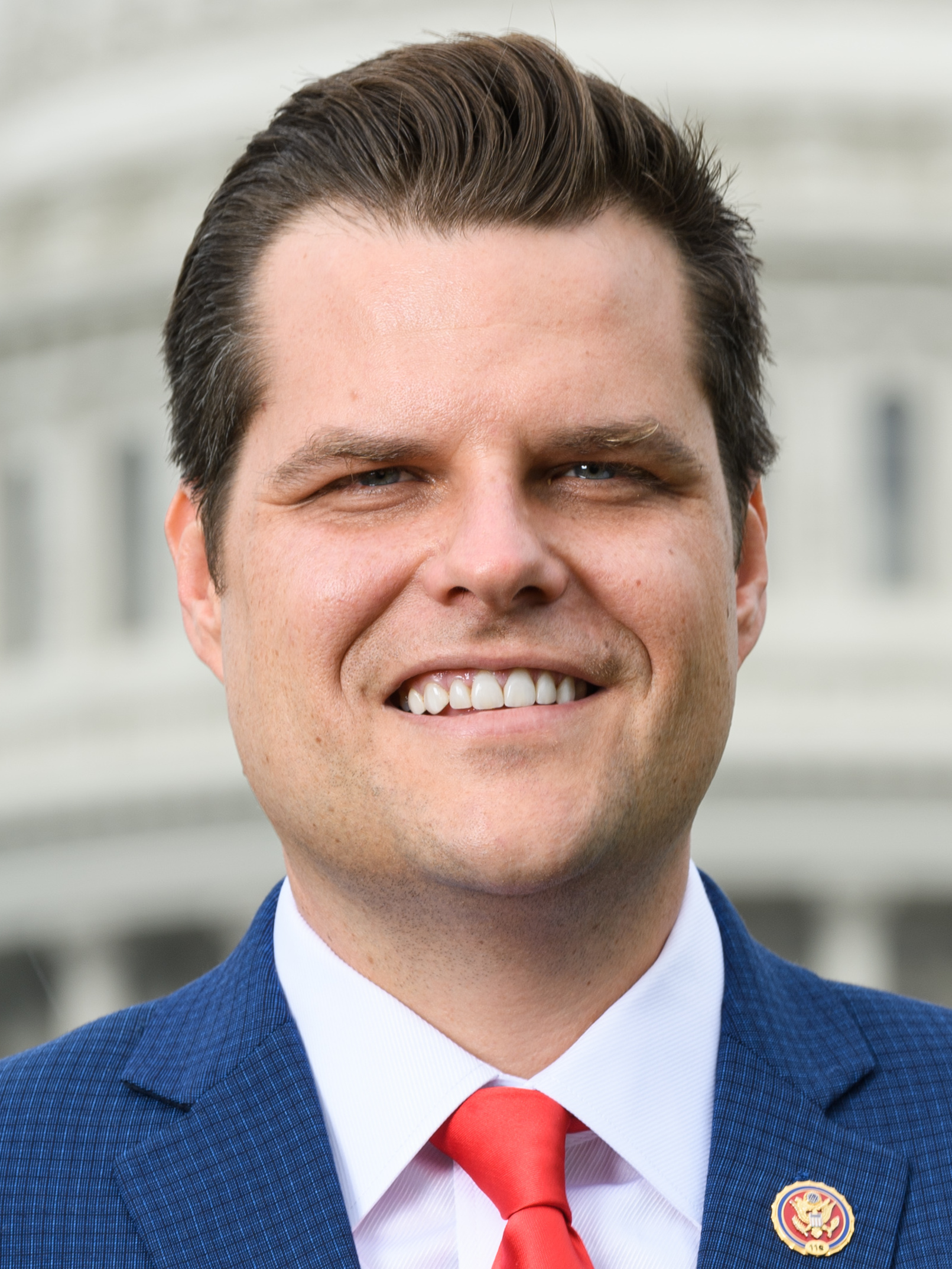
Matt Gaetz

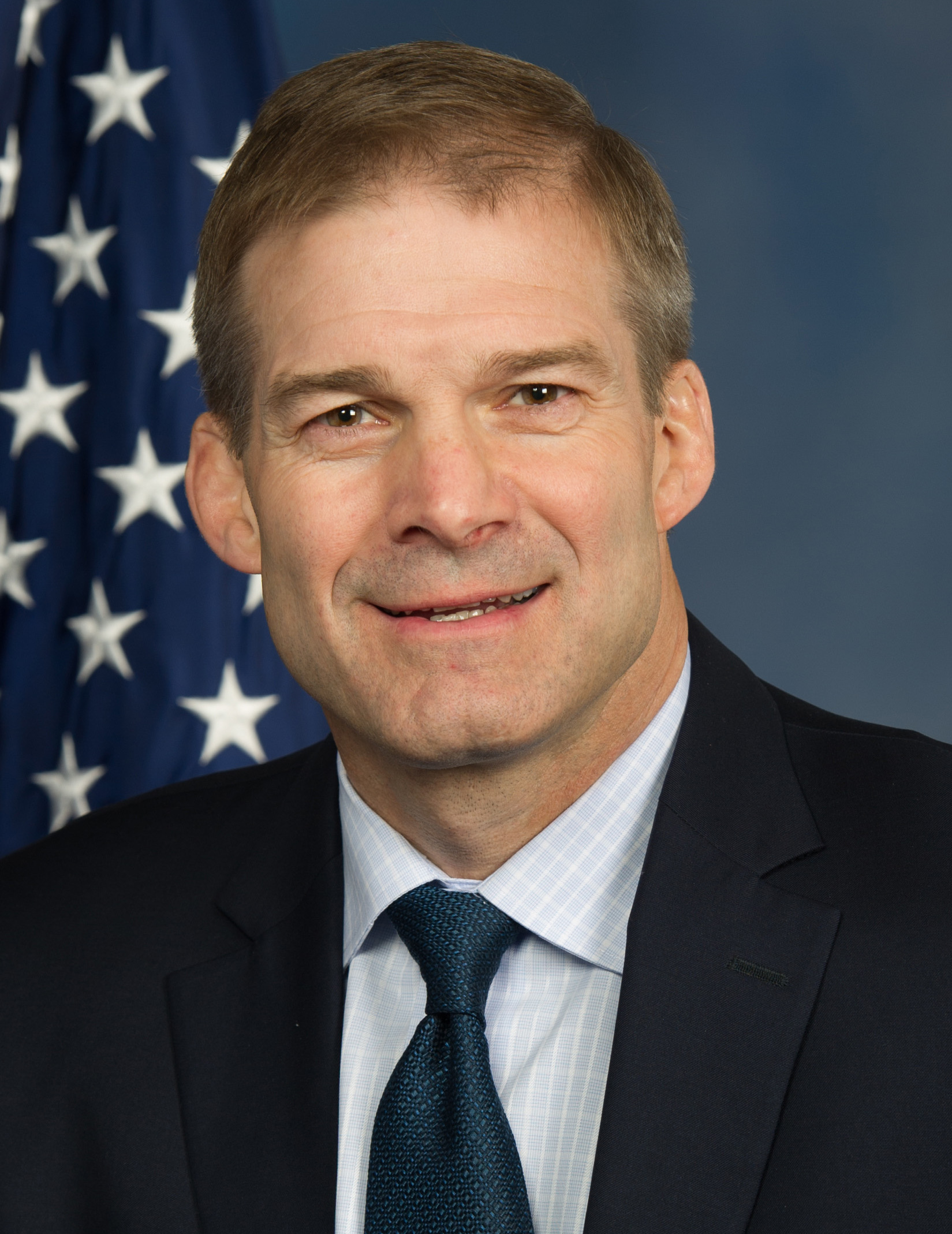
Jim Jordan

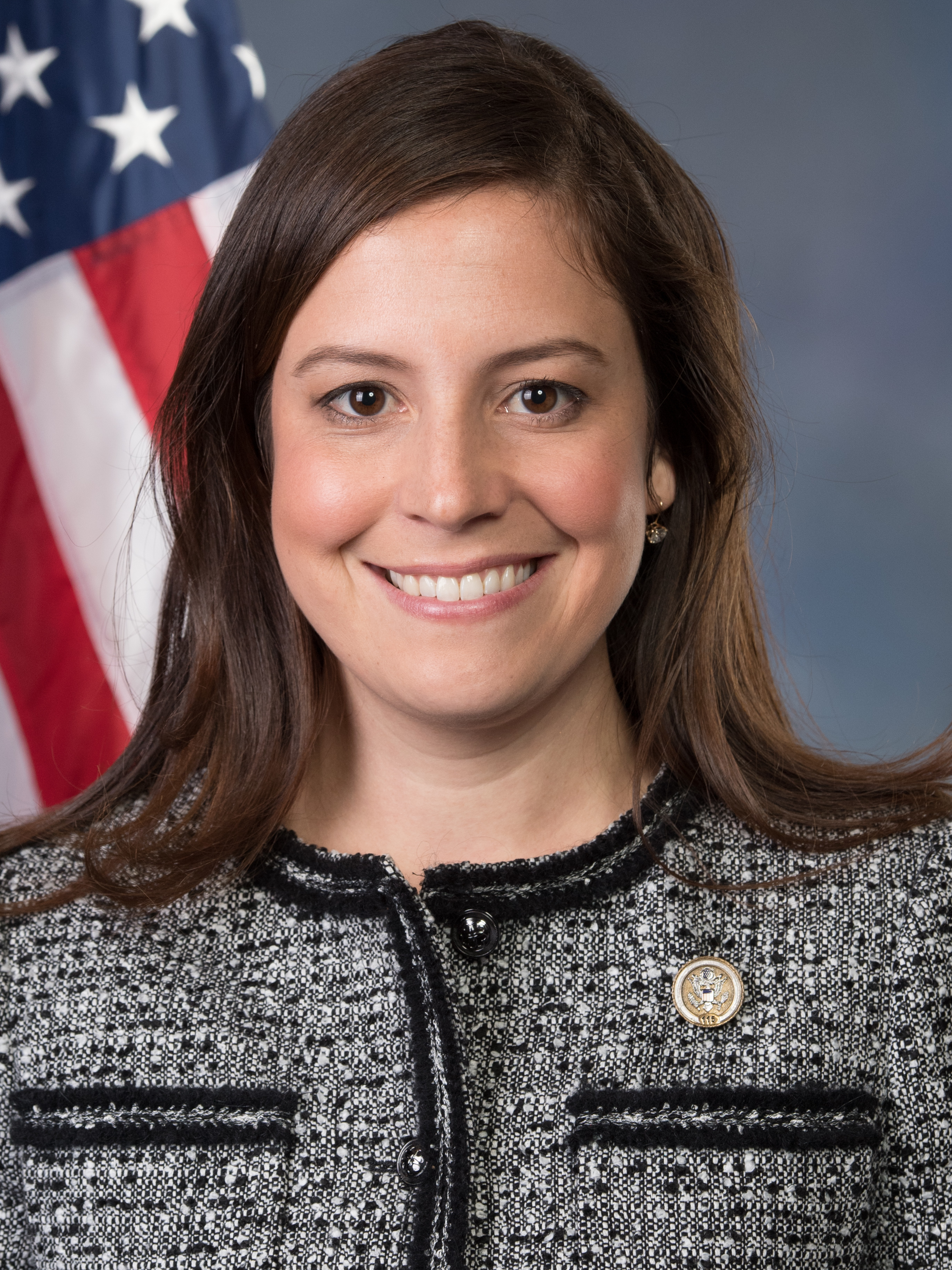
Elise Stefanik

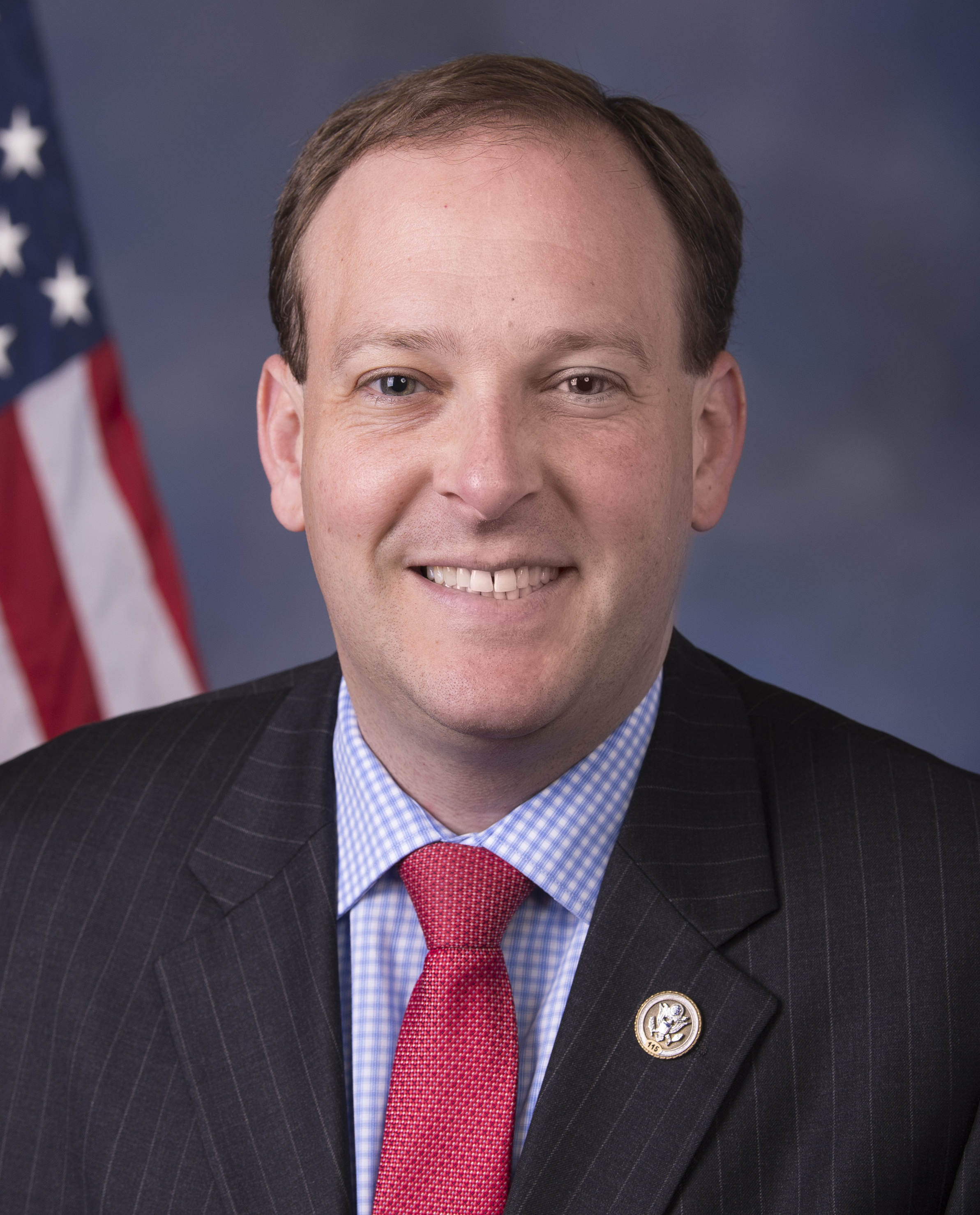
Lee Zeldin

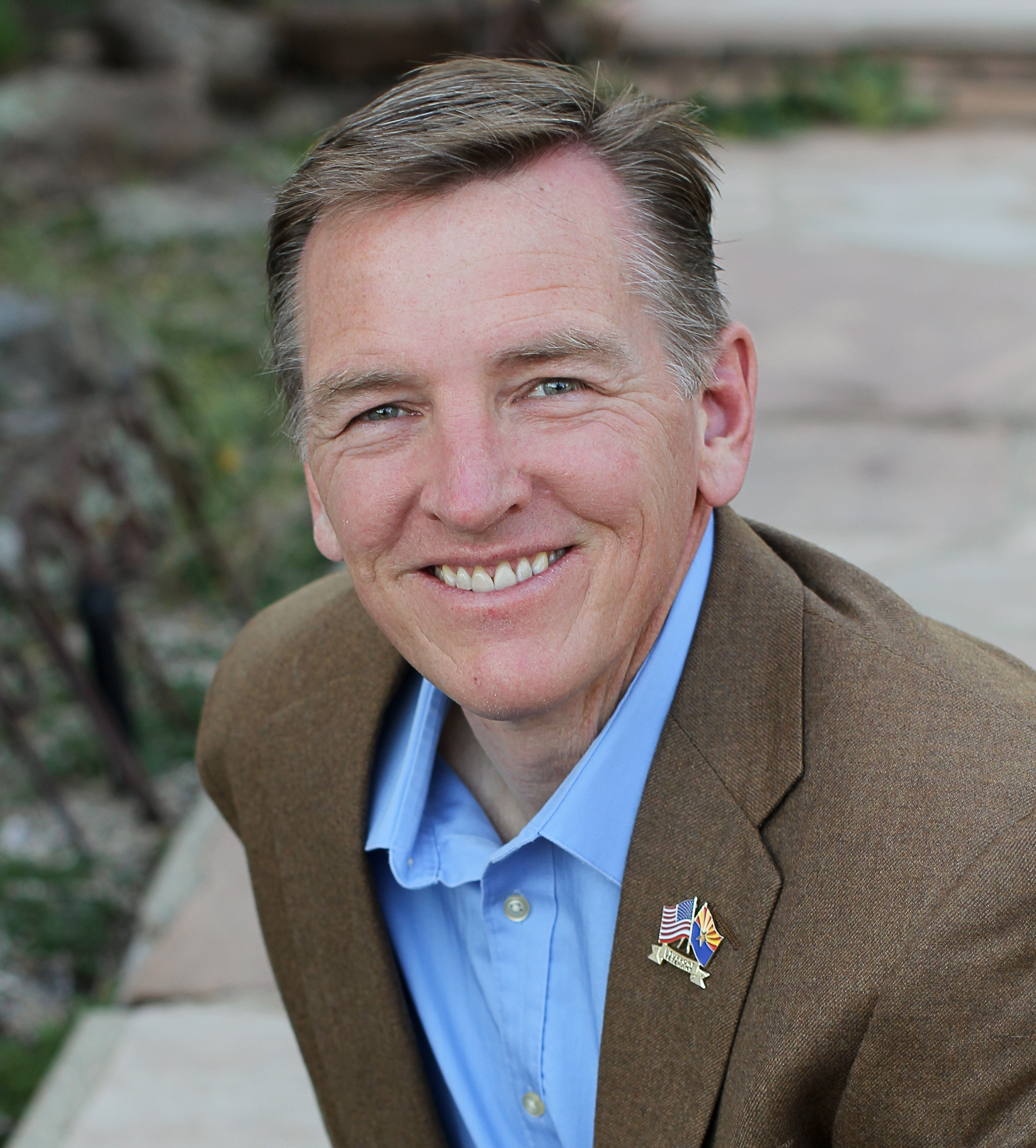
Paul Gosar

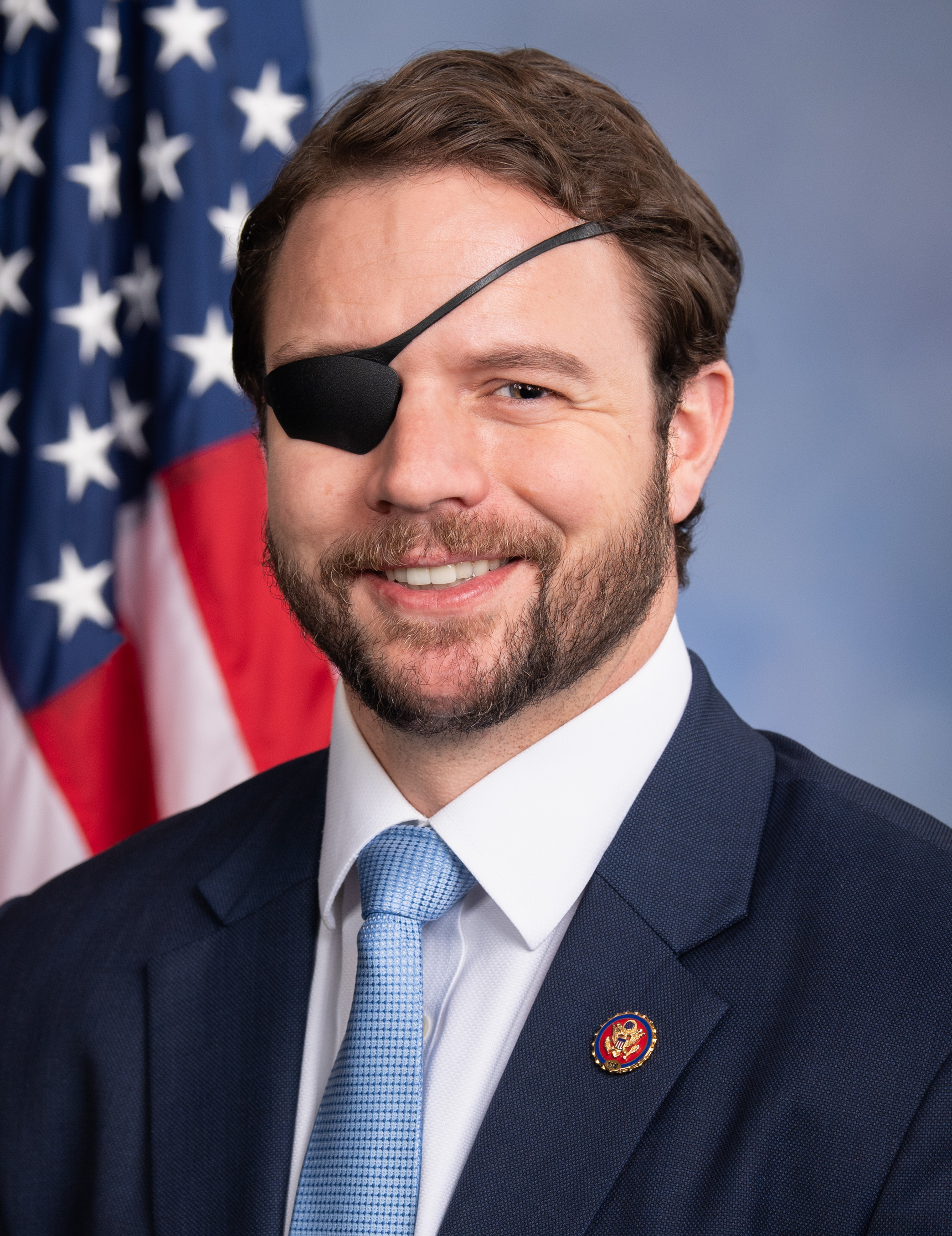
Dan Crenshaw

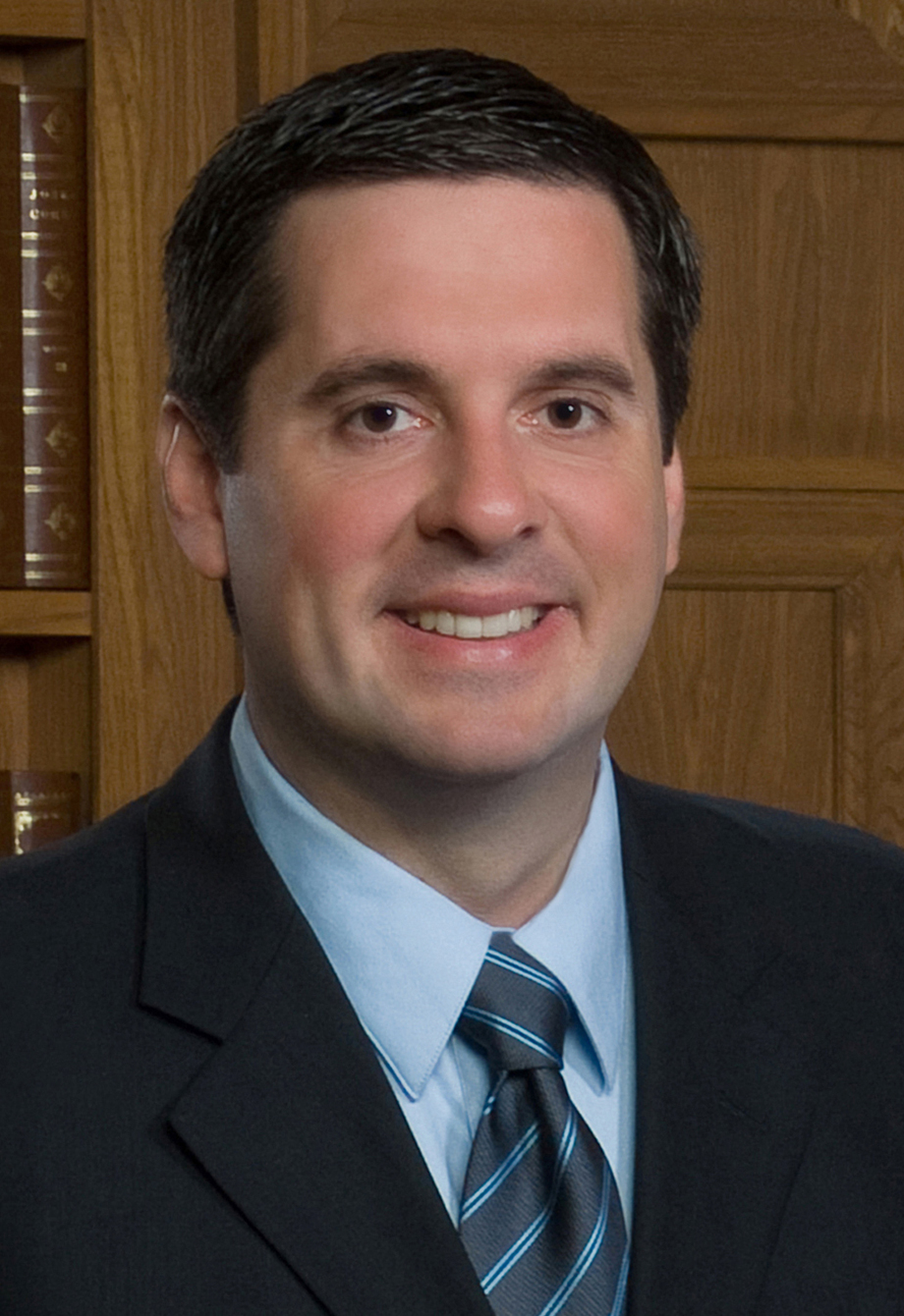
Devin Nunes

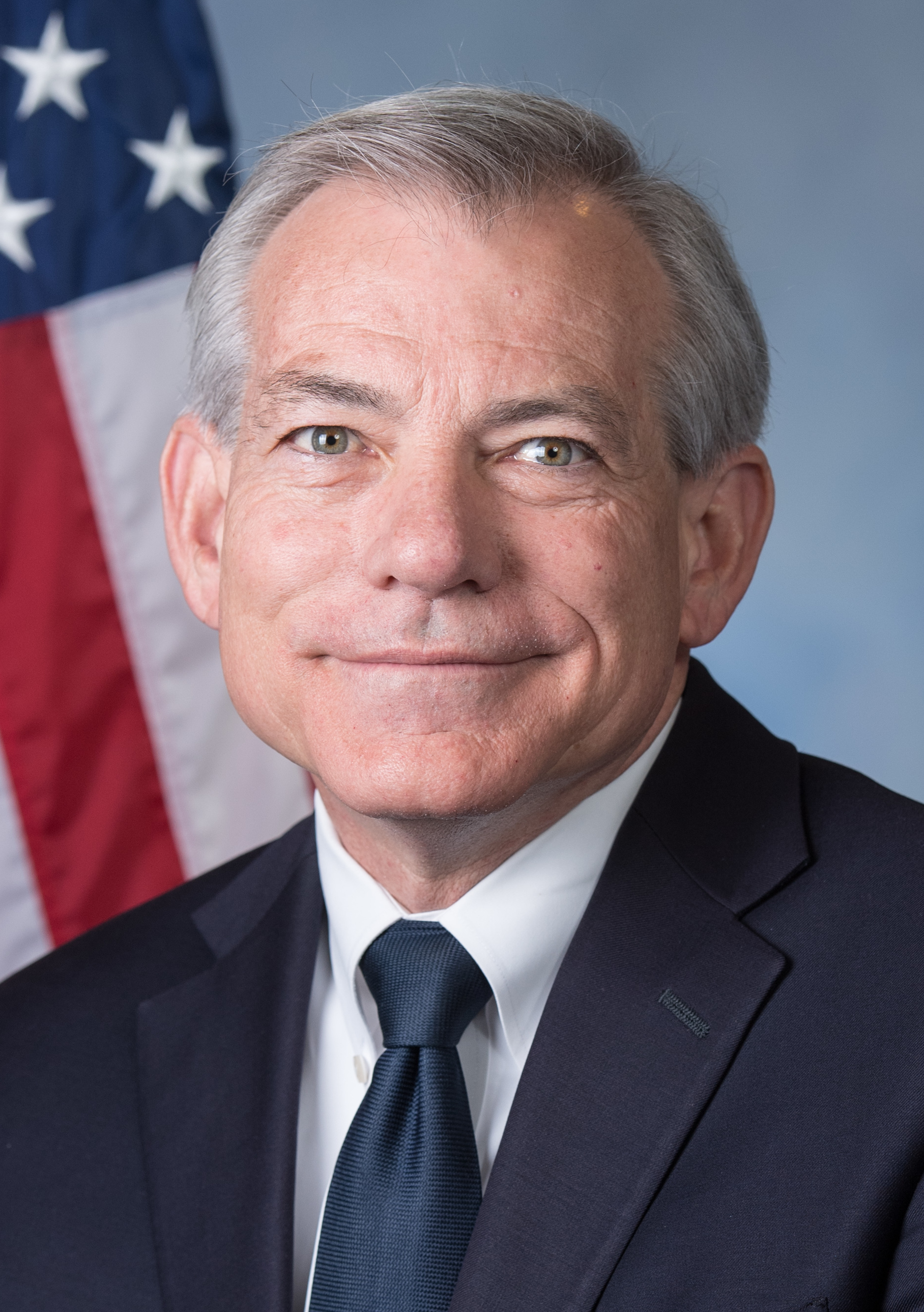
David Schweikert

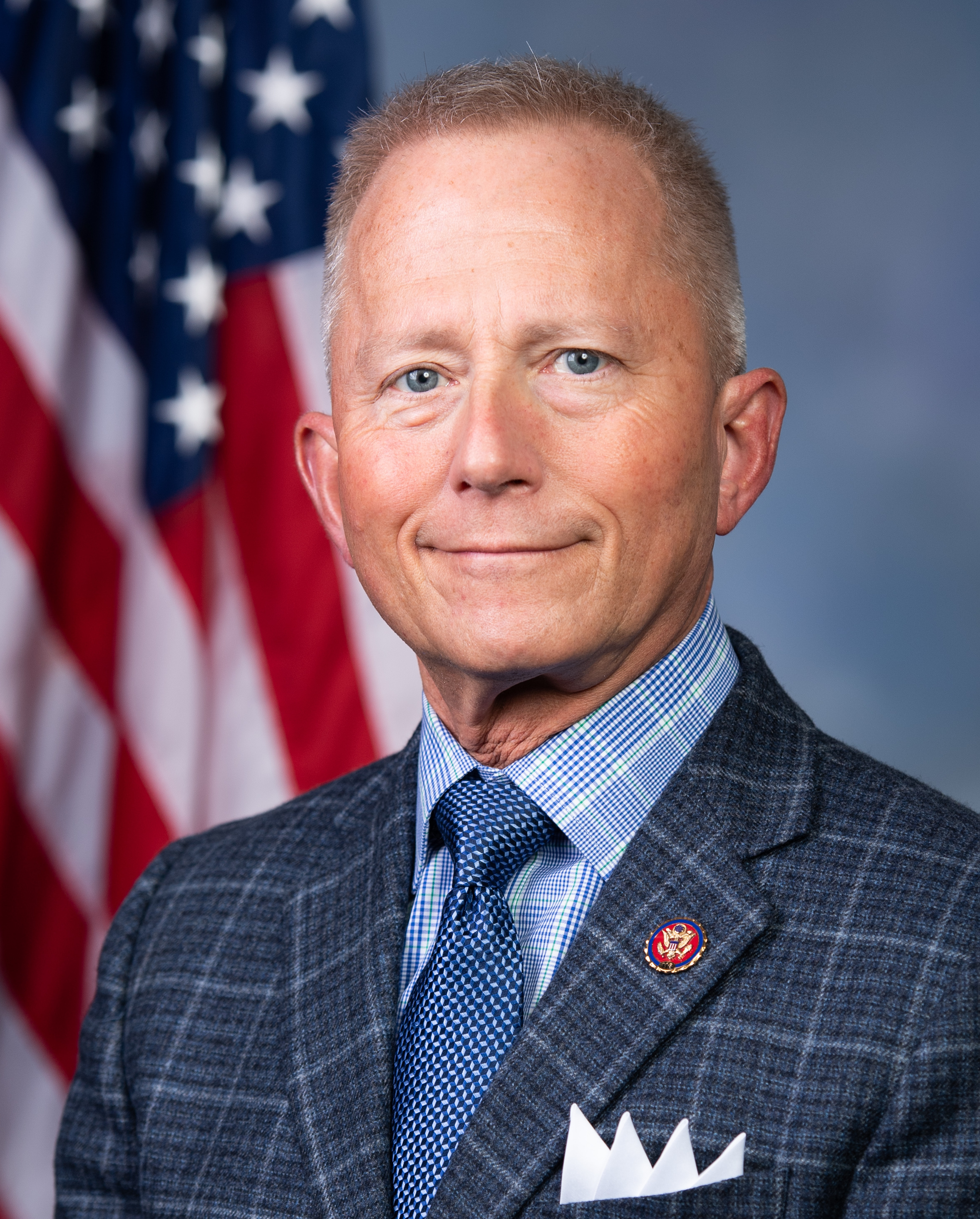
Jeff Van Drew

- Ralph Abraham, U.S. Representative from LA-05 (2015–2021)
- Robert Aderholt, U.S. Representative from AL-04 (1997–present)
- Rick W. Allen, U.S. Representative from GA-12 (2015–present)
- Mark Amodei, U.S. Representative from NV-02 (2011–present)
- Kelly Armstrong, U.S. Representative from ND-AL (2019–2024)
- Jodey Arrington, U.S. Representative from TX-19 (2017–present)
- Don Bacon, U.S. Representative from NE-02 (2017–present)
- Troy Balderson, U.S. Representative from OH-12 (2018–present)
- Jack Bergman, U.S. Representative from MI-01 (2017–present)
- Andy Biggs, U.S. Representative from AZ-05 (2017–present)
- Gus Bilirakis, U.S. Representative from FL-12 (2013–present)
- Dan Bishop, U.S. Representative from NC-09 (2019–2025)
- Rob Bishop, U.S. Representative from UT-01 (2003–2021)
- Mike Bost, U.S. Representative from IL-12 (2015–present)
- Kevin Brady, U.S. Representative from TX-08 (1997–present)
- Mo Brooks, U.S. Representative from AL-05 (2011–2023)
- Ken Buck, U.S. Representative from CO-04 (2011–present)
- Vern Buchanan, U.S. Representative from FL-16 (2013–present) and FL-13 (2007–2013)
- Ted Budd, U.S. Representative from NC-13 (2017–present)
- Tim Burchett, U.S. Representative from TN-02 (2019–present)
- Ken Calvert, U.S. Representative from CA-42 (2013–present), CA-44 (2003–2013) and CA-43 (1993–2003)
- Buddy Carter, U.S. Representative from GA-01 (2015–present)
- John Carter, U.S. Representative from TX-31 (2003–present)
- Steve Chabot, U.S. Representative from OH-01 (1995–2009, 2011–present)
- Liz Cheney, U.S. Representative from WY-AL (2017–2023)
- Doug Collins, U.S. Representative from GA-09 (2013–2021)
- James Comer, U.S. Representative from KY-01 (2016–present)
- Rick Crawford, U.S. Representative from AR-01 (2011–present)
- Dan Crenshaw, U.S. Representative from TX-02 (2019–present) and former U.S. Navy SEAL
- Warren Davidson, U.S. Representative from OH-08 (2016–present)
- Rodney Davis, U.S. Representative from IL-13 (2013–present)
- Scott DesJarlais, U.S. Representative from TN-04 (2011–present)
- Mario Diaz-Balart, U.S. Representative from FL-25 (2013–present, 2003–2011), and FL-21 (2011–2013)
- Jeff Duncan, U.S. Representative from SC-03 (2011–present)
- Neal Dunn, U.S. Representative from FL-02 (2017–present)
- Tom Emmer, U.S. Representative from MN-06 (2015–present)
- Drew Ferguson, U.S. Representative from GA-03 (2017–present)
- Chuck Fleischmann, U.S. Representative from TN-03 (2011–present)
- Jeff Fortenberry, U.S. Representative from NE-01 (2005–2022)
- Luis Fortuño, Shadow Representative from Puerto Rico (2017–2021), Governor of Puerto Rico (2009–2013), Resident Commissioner of Puerto Rico (2005–2009)
- Virginia Foxx, U.S. Representative from NC-05 (2005–present)
- Russ Fulcher, U.S. Representative from ID-01 (2019–present)
- Matt Gaetz, U.S. Representative from FL-01 (2017–2024)
- Mike Gallagher, U.S. Representative from WI-08 (2017–2024)
- Mike Garcia, U.S. Representative from CA-25 (2020–2025)
- Greg Gianforte, U.S. Representative from MT-AL (2017–2021) and 2020 Republican nominee for Governor of Montana
- Bob Gibbs, U.S. Representative from OH-07 (2013–present) and OH-18 (2011–2013)
- Jenniffer González, U.S. Delegate from Puerto Rico (2017–2025)
- Anthony Gonzalez, U.S. Representative from OH-16 (2019–present)
- Paul Gosar, U.S. Representative from AZ-04 (2013–present) and AZ-01 (2011–2013)
- Sam Graves, U.S. Representative from MO-06 (2001–present)
- Garret Graves, U.S. Representative from LA-06 (2015–2025)
- Tom Graves, U.S. Representative from GA-14 (2013–2020), GA-09 (2010–2013)
- Glenn Grothman, U.S. Representative from WI-06 (2015–present)
- Mark Green, U.S. Representative from TN-07 (2019–present)
- Michael Guest, U.S. Representative from MS-03 (2019–present)
- Jim Hagedorn, U.S. Representative from MN-01 (2019–2022)
- Andy Harris, U.S. Representative from MD-01 (2011–present)
- Vicky Hartzler, U.S. Representative from MO-04 (2011–present)
- Kevin Hern, U.S. Representative from OK-01 (2018–present)
- Jaime Herrera Beutler, U.S. Representative from WA-03 (2011–present)
- Jody Hice, U.S. Representative from GA-10 (2015–present)
- Clay Higgins, U.S. Representative from LA-03 (2017–present)
- French Hill, U.S. Representative from AR-02 (2015–present)
- George Holding, U.S. Representative from NC-02 (2017–2021) and NC-13 (2013–2017)
- Richard Hudson, U.S. Representative from NC-08 (2013–present)
- Bill Huizenga, U.S. Representative from MI-02 (2011–present)
- Chris Jacobs, U.S. Representative from NY-27 (2020–present)
- Bill Johnson, U.S. Representative from OH-06 (2011–present)
- Dusty Johnson, U.S. Representative from SD-AL (2019–present) and member of the South Dakota Public Utilities Commission (2005–2011)
- Mike Johnson, U.S. Representative from LA-04 (2017–present)
- Jim Jordan, U.S. Representative from OH-04 (2007–present)
- David Joyce, U.S. Representative from OH-14 (2013–present)
- John Joyce, U.S. Representative from PA-13 (2019–present)
- John Katko, U.S. Representative from NY-24 (2015–present)
- Fred Keller, U.S. Representative from PA-12 (2019–present)
- Mike Kelly, U.S. Representative from PA-16 (2011–present)
- Trent Kelly, U.S. Representative from MS-01 (2015–present)
- Peter King, U.S. Representative from NY-02 (1993–2021)
- Adam Kinzinger, U.S. Representative from IL-16 (2013–2023) and IL-11 (2011–2013)
- David Kustoff, U.S. Representative from TN-08 (2017–present)
- Darin LaHood, U.S. Representative from IL-18 (2015–present)
- Doug Lamborn, U.S. Representative from CO-05 (2007–present)
- Bob Latta, U.S. Representative from OH-05 (2007–present)
- Debbie Lesko, U.S. Representative from AZ-08 (2018–2025)
- Billy Long, U.S. Representative from MO-07 (2011–present)
- Barry Loudermilk, U.S. Representative from GA-11 (2015–present)
- Frank Lucas, U.S. Representative from OK-03 (2003–present) and OK-06 (1994–2003)
- Blaine Luetkemeyer, U.S. Representative from MO-03 (2013–present) and MO-09 (2009–2013)
- Thomas Massie, U.S. Representative from KY-04 (2012–present)
- Brian Mast, U.S. Representative from FL-18 (2017–present)
- Kevin McCarthy, U.S. Representative from CA-23 (2007–2023); House Majority Leader (2014–2019); House Minority Leader (2019–2023)
- Patrick McHenry, U.S. Representative from NC-10 (2005–2025)
- David McKinley, U.S. Representative from WV-01 (2011–2023)
- Tom McClintock, U.S. Representative from California's 4th congressional district (2009–present)
- Dan Meuser, U.S. Representative from PA-09 (2019–present)
- Carol Miller, U.S. Representative from WV-03 (2019–present)
- Paul Mitchell, U.S. Representative from MI-10 (2017–2021)
- John Moolenaar, U.S. Representative from MI-04 (2015–present)
- Alex Mooney, U.S. Representative from WV-02 (2015–present)
- Markwayne Mullin, U.S. Representative from OK-02 (2013–2023)
- Greg Murphy, U.S. Representative from NC-03 (2019–present)
- Dan Newhouse, U.S. Representative from WA-04 (2015–present)
- Ralph Norman, U.S. Representative from SC-05 (2017–present)
- Devin Nunes, U.S. Representative from CA-22 (2013–2022) and CA-21 (2003–2013)
- Steven Palazzo, U.S. Representative from MS-04 (2011–2023)
- Gary Palmer, U.S. Representative from AL-6 (2015–present)
- Greg Pence, U.S. Representative from IN-6 (2019–2025), brother of Vice President Mike Pence
- Scott Perry, U.S. Representative from PA-10 (2013–present)
- Bill Posey, U.S. Representative from FL-08 (2013–present) and FL-15 (2009–2013)
- Amata Coleman Radewagen, U.S. Delegate from AS-AL (2015–present)
- Tom Reed, U.S. Representative from NY-29 (2010–2013), NY-23 (2013–present)
- Guy Reschenthaler, U.S. Representative from PA-14 (2019–present)
- Tom Rice, U.S. Representative from SC-07 (2013–2023)
- ~~Denver Riggleman, U.S. Representative from VA-5 (2019–2021)~~ (Withdrew endorsement)
- Cathy McMorris Rodgers, U.S. Representative from WA-05 (2005–2025)
- Phil Roe, U.S. Representative from TN-01 (2009–2021)
- Mike Rogers, U.S. Representative from AL-03 (2003–present)
- John Rose, U.S. Representative from TN-06 (2019–present)
- David Rouzer, U.S. Representative from NC-07 (2015–present)
- John Rutherford, U.S. Representative from FL-04 (2017–present)
- Steve Scalise, U.S. Representative from LA-1 (2008–present); House Majority Whip (2014–2019); House Minority Whip (2019–2023)
- David Schweikert, U.S. Representative from AZ-06 (2013–present) and AZ-05 (2011–2013)
- Austin Scott, U.S. Representative from GA-08 (2011–present)
- Jim Sensenbrenner, U.S. Representative from WI-05 (2003–2021) and WI-09 (1979–2003)
- ~~John Shimkus, U.S. Representative from IL-15 (2013–2021), IL-19 (2003–2019) and IL-15 (1997–2003)~~ (Withdrew endorsement)
- Michael Simpson, U.S. Representative from ID-02 (1999–present)
- Adrian Smith, U.S. Representative from NE-03 (2007–present)
- Chris Smith, U.S. Representative from NJ-04 (1981–present)
- Jason Smith, U.S. Representative from MO-08 (2013–present)
- Lloyd Smucker, U.S. Representative from PA-11 (2019–present) and PA-16 (2017–2019)
- Ross Spano, U.S. Representative from FL-15 (2019–2021)
- Pete Stauber, U.S. Representative from MN-08 (2019–present)
- Elise Stefanik, U.S. Representative from NY-21 (2015–present)
- Bryan Steil, U.S. Representative from WI-01 (2019–present)
- Greg Steube, U.S. Representative from FL-19 (2019–present)
- Chris Stewart, U.S. Representative from UT-02 (2013–present)
- Steve Stivers, U.S. Representative from OH-15 (2011–2021)
- Glenn Thompson, U.S. Representative from PA-15 (2009–present)
- Tom Tiffany, U.S. Representative from WI-07 (2020–present)
- William Timmons, U.S. Representative from SC-04 (2019–present)
- Scott Tipton, U.S. Representative from CO-3 (2011–2021)
- Mike Turner, U.S. Representative from OH-10 (2013–present) and OH-03 (2003–2013)
- Jeff Van Drew, U.S. Representative from NJ-02 (2019–present) (Formerly Democratic, Republican since 2020)
- Ann Wagner, U.S. Representative from MO-02 (2013–present) and U.S. Ambassador to Luxembourg (2005–2009)
- Mark Walker, U.S. Representative from NC-06 (2015–2021)
- Michael Waltz, U.S. Representative from FL-06 (2019–2025)
- Steve Watkins, U.S. Representative from KS-02 (2019–2021)
- Daniel Webster, U.S. Representative from FL-11 (2017–present), FL-10 (2013–2017) and FL-08 (2011–2013)
- Brad Wenstrup, U.S. Representative from OH-02 (2013–present)
- Bruce Westerman, U.S. Representative from AR-04 (2015–present)
- Roger Williams, U.S. Representative from TX-25 (2013–present)
- Joe Wilson, U.S. Representative from SC-02 (2001–present)
- Rob Wittman, U.S. Representative from VA-01 (2007–present)
- Steve Womack, U.S. Representative from AR-03 (2011–present)
- Rob Woodall, U.S. Representative from GA-07 (2011–2021)
- Ted Yoho, U.S. Representative from FL-3 (2013–2021)
- Don Young, U.S. Representative from AK-ATL (1973–2022)
- Lee Zeldin, U.S. Representative from NY-1 (2015–2023)

=== Former ===
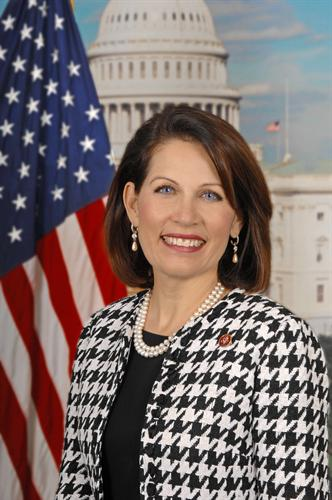
Michele Bachmann

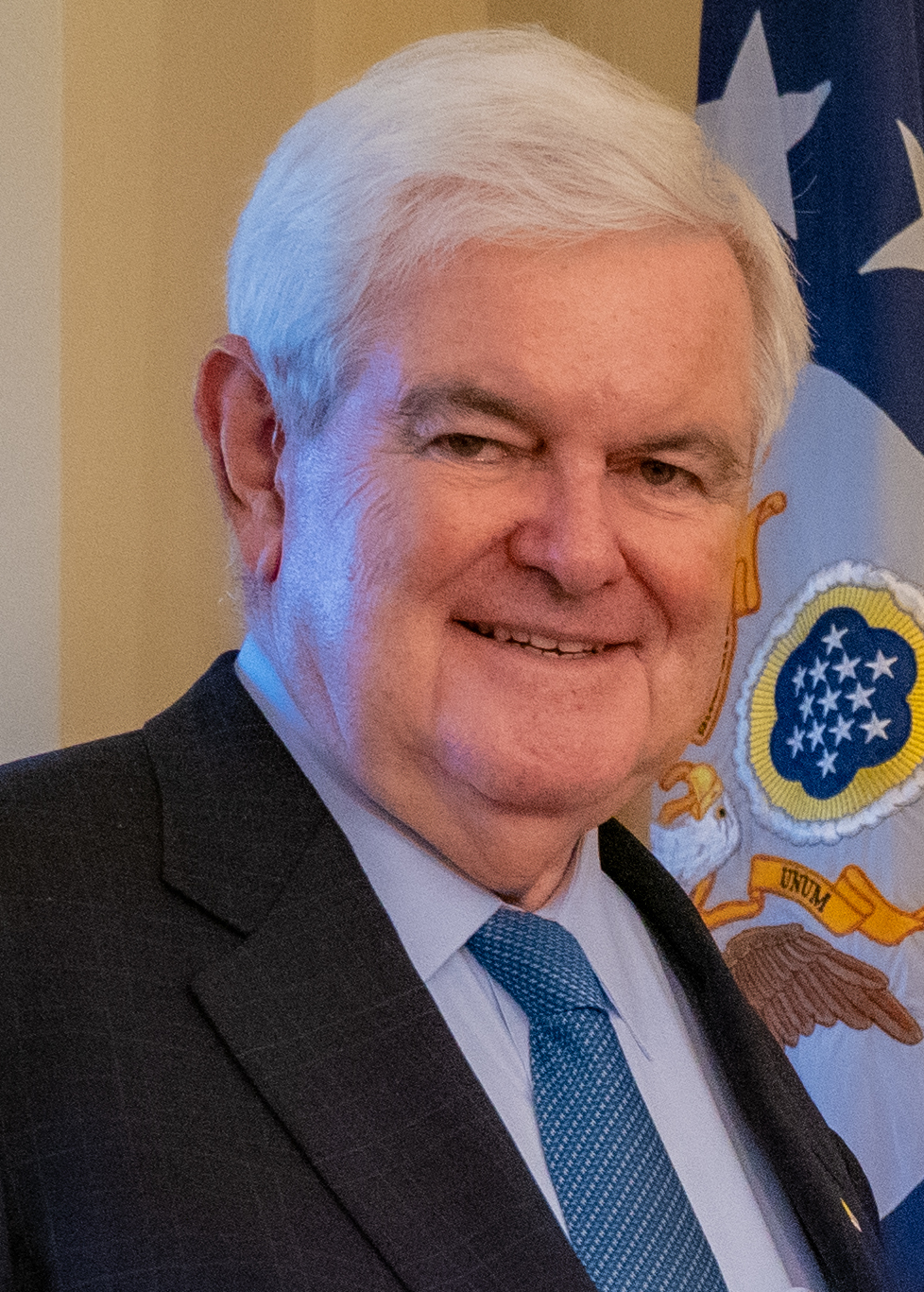
Newt Gingrich

- Steve Austria, U.S. Representative from OH-07 (2009–2013)
- Michele Bachmann, U.S. Representative from MN-06 (2007–2015)
- Lou Barletta, U.S. Representative from PA-11 (2011–2019), Mayor of Hazleton, Pennsylvania (2000–2010)
- Joe Barton, U.S. Representative from TX-06 (1985–2019)
- Kerry Bentivolio, U.S. Representative from MI-11 (2013–2015)
- Rod Blum, U.S. Representative from IA-01 (2015–2019)
- Jason Chaffetz, U.S. Representative from UT-03 (2009–2017)
- Thelma Drake, U.S. Representative from VA-02 (2005–2009)
- Sean Duffy, U.S. Representative from WI-07 (2011–2019)
- Bob Ehrlich, U.S. Representative from MD-02 (1995–2003) and Governor of Maryland (2003–2007)
- Renee Ellmers, U.S. Representative from NC-02 (2011–2017)
- John Faso, U.S. Representative from NY-19 (2017–2019)
- Randy Forbes, U.S. Representative from VA-04 (2001–2017)
- Vito Fossella, U.S. Representative from NY-13 (1997–2009)
- Trent Franks, U.S. Representative from AZ-08 (2013–2017) and AZ-02 (2003–2013)
- Newt Gingrich, U.S. Speaker of the House (1995–1999), U.S. Representative from GA-06 (1979–1999)
- Gil Gutknecht, U.S. Representative from MN-01 (1995–2007)
- Karen Handel, U.S. Representative from GA-06 (2017–2019), Secretary of State of Georgia (2007–2010), and 2020 Republican Nominee for GA-06
- Nan Hayworth, U.S. Representative from NY-19 (2011–2013)
- Tim Huelskamp, U.S. Representative from KS-01 (2011–2017)
- Duncan Hunter, U.S. Representative from CA-50 (2009–2020)
- Darrell Issa, U.S. Representative from CA-49 (2001–2019)
- Jack Kingston, U.S. Representative from GA-01 (1993–2015)
- Raul Labrador, U.S. Representative from ID-01 (2011–2019) and Chair of the Idaho Republican Party (2019–2020)
- Jason Lewis, U.S. Representative from MN-02 (2017–2019)
- Robert Livingston, U.S. Representative from LA-01 (1977–1999)
- Cynthia Lummis, U.S. Representative from WY-ATL (2009–2017)
- Bob McEwen, U.S. Representative from OH-06 (1981–1993)
- Doug Ose, U.S. Representative from CA-03 (1999–2005)
- Bruce Poliquin, U.S. Representative from ME-02 (2015–2019)
- Jim Renacci, U.S. Representative from OH-16 (2011–2019)
- Donald Ritter, U.S. Representative from PA-15 (1979–1993)
- Dana Rohrabacher, U.S. Representative from CA-48 (2013–2019), CA-46 (2003–2013), CA-45 (1993–2003) and CA-42 (1989–1993)
- Todd Rokita, U.S. Representative from IN-04 (2011–2019), Secretary of State of Indiana (2002–2010)
- Keith Rothfus, U.S. Representative from PA-12 (2013–2019)
- Jim Ryun, U.S. Representative from KS-02 (1996–2007)
- Bobby Schilling, U.S. Representative from IL-17 (2011–2013)
- Bill Schuette, U.S. Representative from MI-10 (1985–1991) and Attorney General of Michigan (2011–2019)
- Pete Sessions, U.S. Representative from TX-32 (2003–2019), TX-05 (1997–2003), and TX-17 (2021–present)
- Norman Shumway, U.S. Representative from CA-14 (1979–1991)
- Rob Simmons, U.S. Representative from CT-02 (2001–2007)
- Scott Taylor, U.S. Representative from VA-02 (2017–2019)
- Claudia Tenney, U.S. Representative from NY-22 (2017–2019)
- David Valadao, U.S. Representative from CA-21 (2013–2019)
- Zach Wamp, U.S. Representative from TN-03 (1995–2011)
- David Young, U.S. Representative from IA-03 (2015–2019)

== Municipal and local officials ==
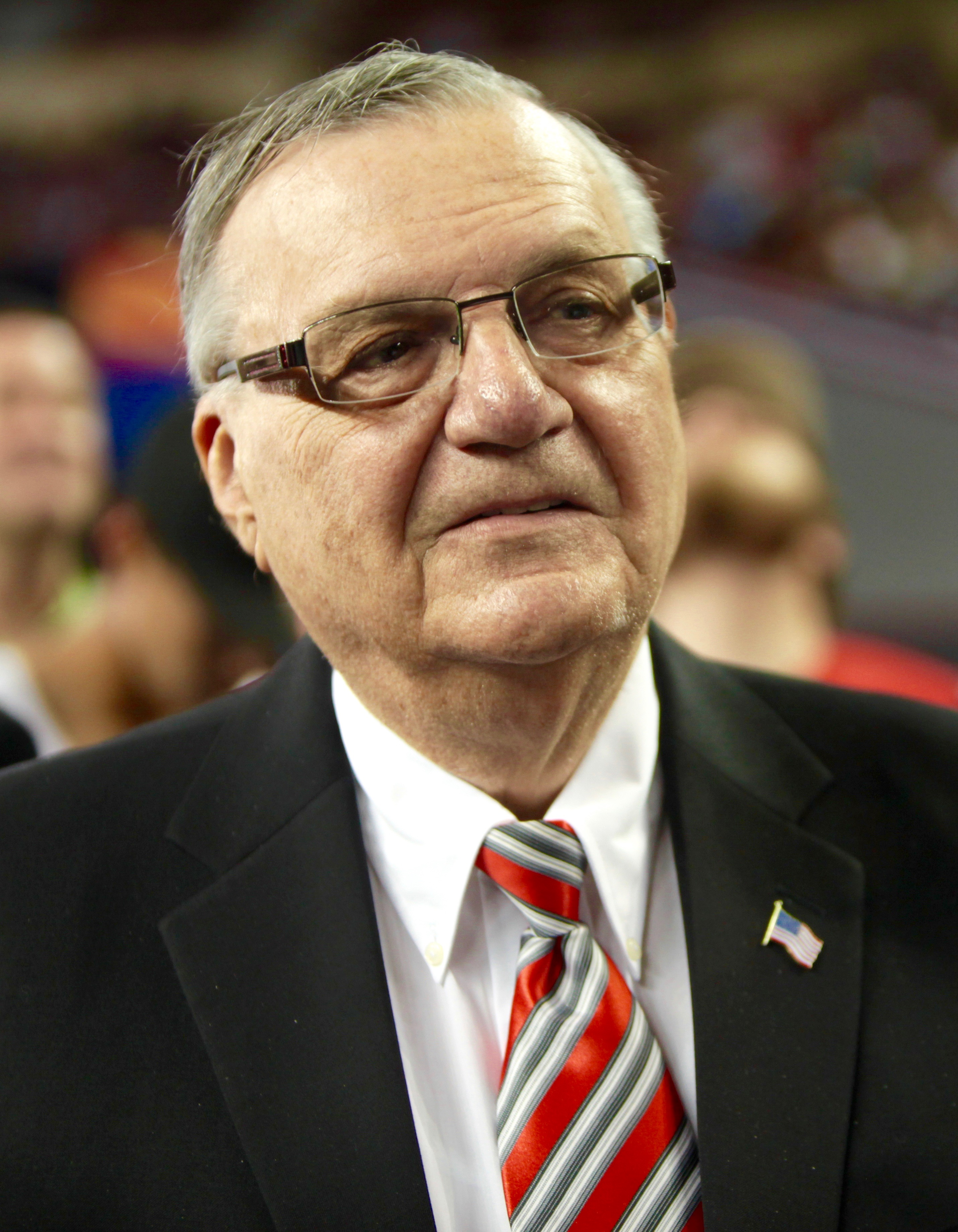
Joe Arpaio

=== Mayors and county executives ===
==== Current ====
- David Alexander, Mayor of Franklin County, Tennessee (2018–present)
- Steve Bakken, Mayor of Bismarck, North Dakota (2018–2022)
- Brandon Bochenski, Mayor of Grand Forks, North Dakota (2020–present) and former Kazakhstani professional ice hockey player
- Bill Currier, Mayor of Adair Village, Oregon (2007–???) and Chair of the Oregon Republican Party (2015-2021)
- Lenny Curry, Mayor of Jacksonville, Florida (2015–2023) and Chair of the Florida Republican Party (2011–2014)
- Bobby Dyer, Mayor of Virginia Beach, Virginia (2018–present)
- Paul Farrow, County Executive of Waukesha County (2015–2026)
- Lou Gargiulo, Chair of the Hampton Falls Board of Selectmen (2019–present)
- Carlos Giménez, Mayor of Miami-Dade County, Florida (2011–2020) and 2020 Republican nominee for FL-26
- Randy Henderson, Mayor of Fort Myers, Florida (2009–2020)
- John Lee, Mayor of North Las Vegas, Nevada (2013–2022) (Democrat)
- Carlos Rendo, Mayor of Woodcliff Lake, New Jersey (2016–present)
- Jean Stothert, Mayor of Omaha, Nebraska (2013–2025)
- Jerry Weiers, Mayor of Glendale, Arizona (2013–present)

==== Former ====
- Jason Anavitarte, Mayor pro tempore of Doraville, Georgia (2004–2009)
- Rob Astorino, County Executive of Westchester County (2010–2017) and member of the Westchester County Board of Legislators from District 3 (2003–2004)
- Charles Evers, Mayor of Fayette, Mississippi (1969–1981, 1985–1989) (Deceased)
- Jim Greer, Deputy Mayor of Oviedo, Florida (2004–2008) and Chair of the Florida Republican Party (2006–2010)
- Marilyn John, Mayor of Shelby, Ohio (2010–2015)
- Steve Lonegan, Mayor of Bogota, New Jersey (1995–2008)
- Rita Sanders, Mayor of Bellevue, Nebraska (2010–2015)
- Thurston Smith, Mayor of Hesperia, California (2008–2014)
- Beth Van Duyne, Mayor of Irving, Texas (2011–2017) and U.S. Representative from TX-24 (2021–present)

=== Municipal executive officials ===
==== Current ====
- James Craig, Chief of the Detroit Police Department (2013–2021)
- Bob Gualtieri, Sheriff of Pinellas County, Florida (2011–present)
- Thomas M. Hodgson, Sheriff of Bristol County, Massachusetts (1997–2023)
- David Hooten, County Clerk of Oklahoma County (2016–2022)
- Mark Lamb, Sheriff of Pinal County, Arizona (2017–2024)
- Joe Lombardo, Sheriff of Clark County, Nevada (2015-2023)
- Troy Nehls, Sheriff of Fort Bend County, Texas (2013–2021) and Republican nominee for Texas's 22nd congressional district
- William Snyder, Sheriff of Martin County, Florida (2013–2025)
- Jeff Wilson, Port of Longview Commissioner (2016–present)

==== Former ====
- Joe Arpaio, Sheriff of Maricopa County, Arizona (1993–2017)
- David Clarke, Sheriff of Milwaukee County, Wisconsin (2002–2017) (Democrat)
- Mark Curran, Sheriff of Lake County, Illinois (2006–2018)
- Emilio Gonzalez, Chief Administrative Officer of the City of Miami (2018–2020)
- Bernard Kerik, Commissioner of the New York City Police Department (2000–2001) and convicted felon (Granted pardon by Trump in February 2020)
- Sandra O'Brien, Auditor of Ashtabula County (1994–2007)
- Carl Paladino, member of the Buffalo Public Schools Board of Education from the Park District (2013–2017)
- Leticia Remauro, Chair of the Staten Island Community Board 1 (2009–2015)
- Carolyn Bunny Welsh, Sheriff of Chester County, Pennsylvania (2000–2020)

=== Municipal judicial officials ===
==== Current ====
- Lucas Babin, District Attorney of Tyler County, Texas (2019–2026)

==== Former ====
- Jenna Ellis, Deputy District Attorney of Weld County, Colorado (2012–2013)
- Thomas P. Maney, County Judge of Okaloosa County (1989–2018)
- Jeanine Pirro, District Attorney of Westchester County (1994–2005) and host of Justice with Judge Jeanine

=== Municipal legislative officials ===
==== Current ====
- Nan Baker, member of the Cuyahoga County Council from District 1 (2017–2023)
- Webster Barnaby, member of the Deltona City Commission from District 2 (2011–present)
- Annie Black, member of the Mesquite City Council (2018–present)
- Joe Borelli, member of the New York City Council from District 51 (2015–present)
- Skip Brandt, member of the Idaho County Board of Commissioners (2007–present)
- Jerry Carl, member of the Mobile County Commission from District 3 (2012–present) and U.S. Representative from AL-01 (2021–present)
- Roger Conley, member of the Vienna City Council (2016–present)
- Scott Franklin, member of the Lakeland City Commission from the Southeast District (2018–present) and U.S. Representative from FL-15 (2021–present)
- Michele Fiore, member of the Las Vegas City Council from Ward 6 (2017–present), Mayor Pro Tem of Las Vegas (2019–2020) and member of the Nevada Assembly from District 4 (2012–2016)
- Jeff Johnson, member of the Hennepin County Board of Commissioners from District 7 (2009–present)
- Barbara Kirkmeyer, member of the Weld County Board of County Commissioners from District 3 (2008–present, 1993–2001)
- Paul Koering, member of the Crow Wing County Board from District 1 (2017–present)
- Steven Matteo, member of the New York City Council from District 50 (2014–present)
- Sean Morrison, member of the Cook County Board of Commissioners from District 17 (2015–present)
- Peter Oberacker, member of the Otsego County Board of Representatives from District 6 (2015–present)
- Joshua Parsons, member of the Lancaster County Board of Commissioners (2016–present)
- Andres Pico, member of the Colorado Springs City Council from District 6 (2013–present)
- Alex Rizo, Vice Chair of the Miami-Dade County Community Council 5 (2015–present)
- Victoria Seaman, member of the Las Vegas City Council from the 2nd Ward (2019–present) and member of the Nevada Assembly from District 34 (2014–2019)
- Rich Pahls, member of the Omaha City Council from District 5 (2013–present)
- Michelle Steel, member of the Orange County Board of Supervisors from District 2 (2015–2021)and U.S. Representative from CA-48 (2021–2025)
- Eric Ulrich, member of the New York City Council from District 32 (2009–2021)
- Tonya Van Beber, member of the Weld County Council from the at-large district (2018–present)
- Mark Waller, member of the Board of El Paso County Commissioners from District 2 (2016–2021)
- Wayne W. Williams, member of the Colorado Springs City Council from the at-large district (2019–present) and Secretary of State of Colorado (2015–2019)
- Aimee Winder Newton, member of the Salt Lake County Council from District 3 (2014–present)
- Jack Woodrum, member of Summers County Commission (2010–present)
- Jeff Zenger, member of the Lewisville Town Council (2010–present)

==== Former ====
- Michael Berry, member of the Houston City Council from the At-Large Position 5 District (2004–2008) and At-Large Position 4 District (2002–2004)
- Jeff Cardwell, member of the Indianapolis City-County Council from District 23 (2008–2013)
- Eugene Delgaudio, member of the Loudoun County Board of Supervisors from the Sterling District (2000–2015)
- Carl DeMaio, member of the San Diego City Council from District 5 (2008–2012)
- Erick Erickson, member of the Macon City Council from Ward 5 (2007–2011) and conservative commentator
- Bob Good, member of the Campbell County Board of Supervisors (2016–2019) and U.S. Representative from VA-05 (2021–present)
- Andrew Stein, President of the New York City Council (1986–1994) and Borough President of Manhattan (1978–1985) (Democrat)
- Corey Stewart, Chair of the Prince William Board of County Supervisors (2006–2019) and Occoquan District Supervisor (2003–2006)
- Bruce Woodbury, member of the Clark County Commission from District A (1981–2009)

== International politicians ==
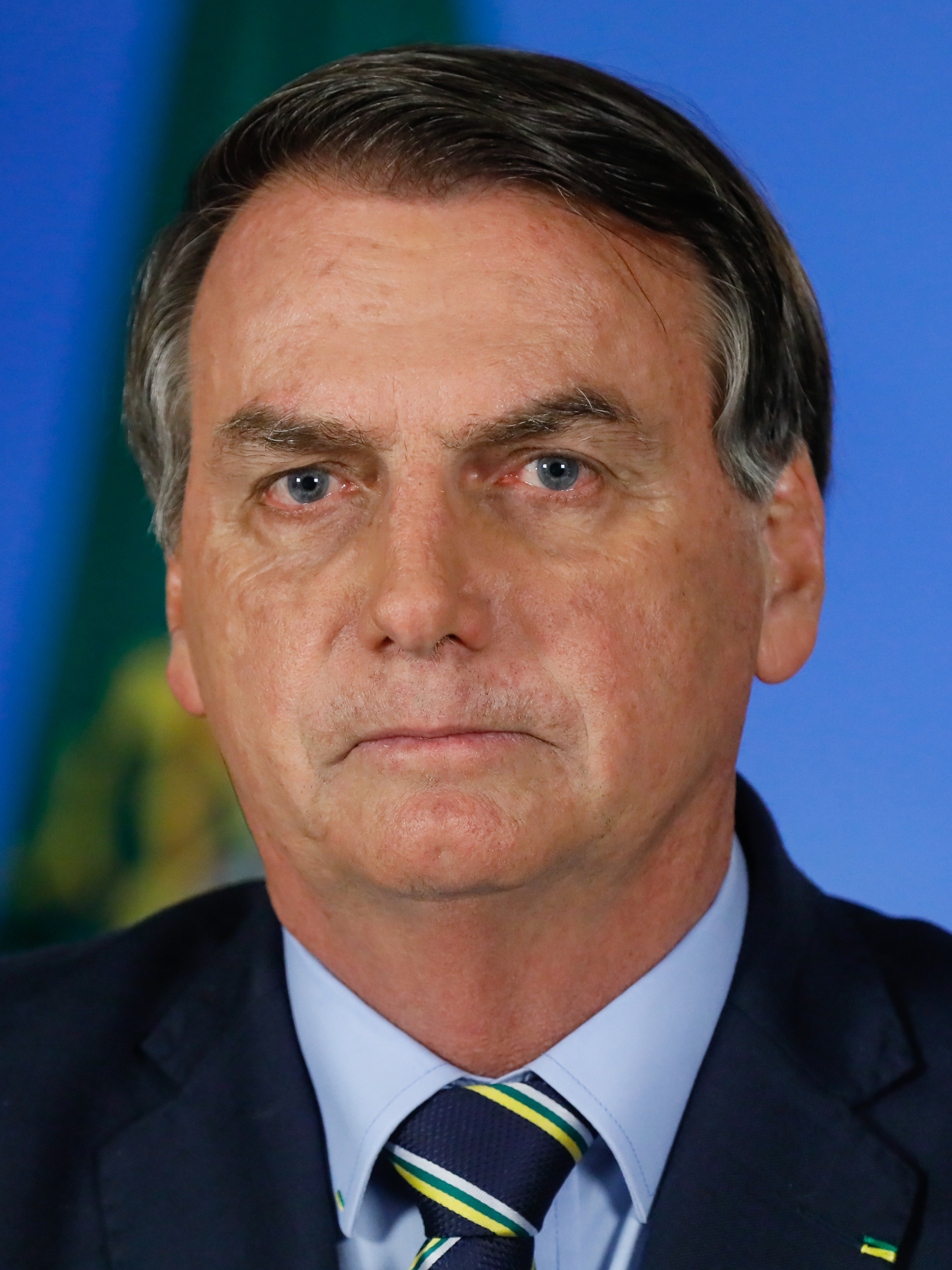
Jair Bolsonaro

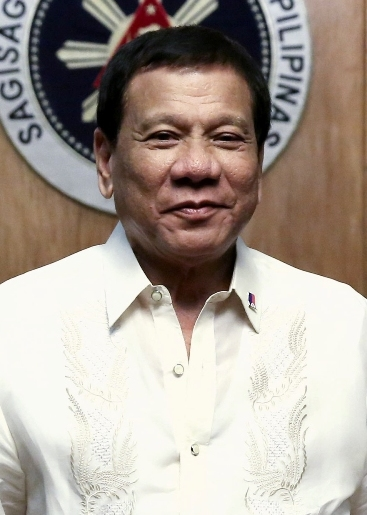
Rodrigo Duterte

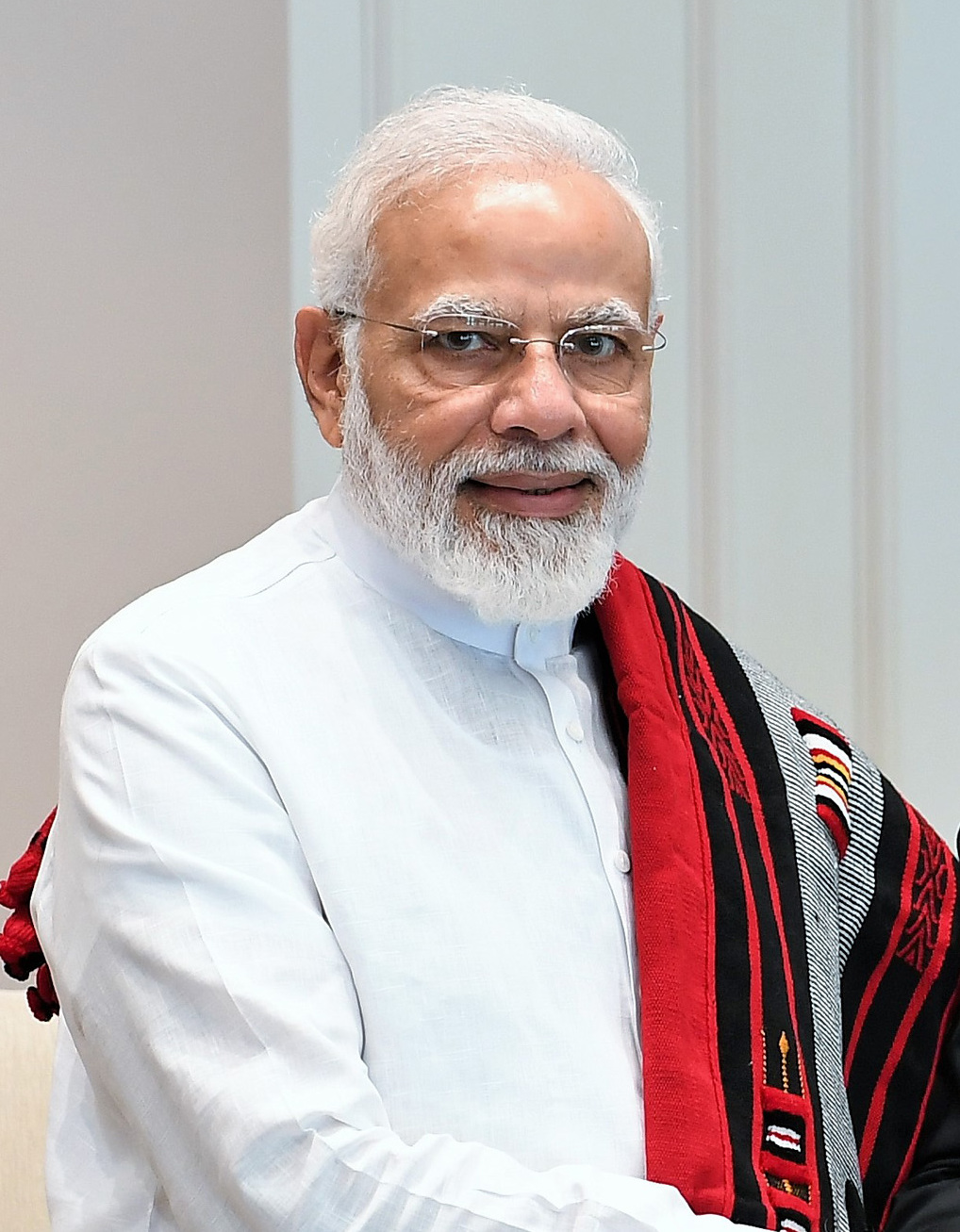
Narendra Modi

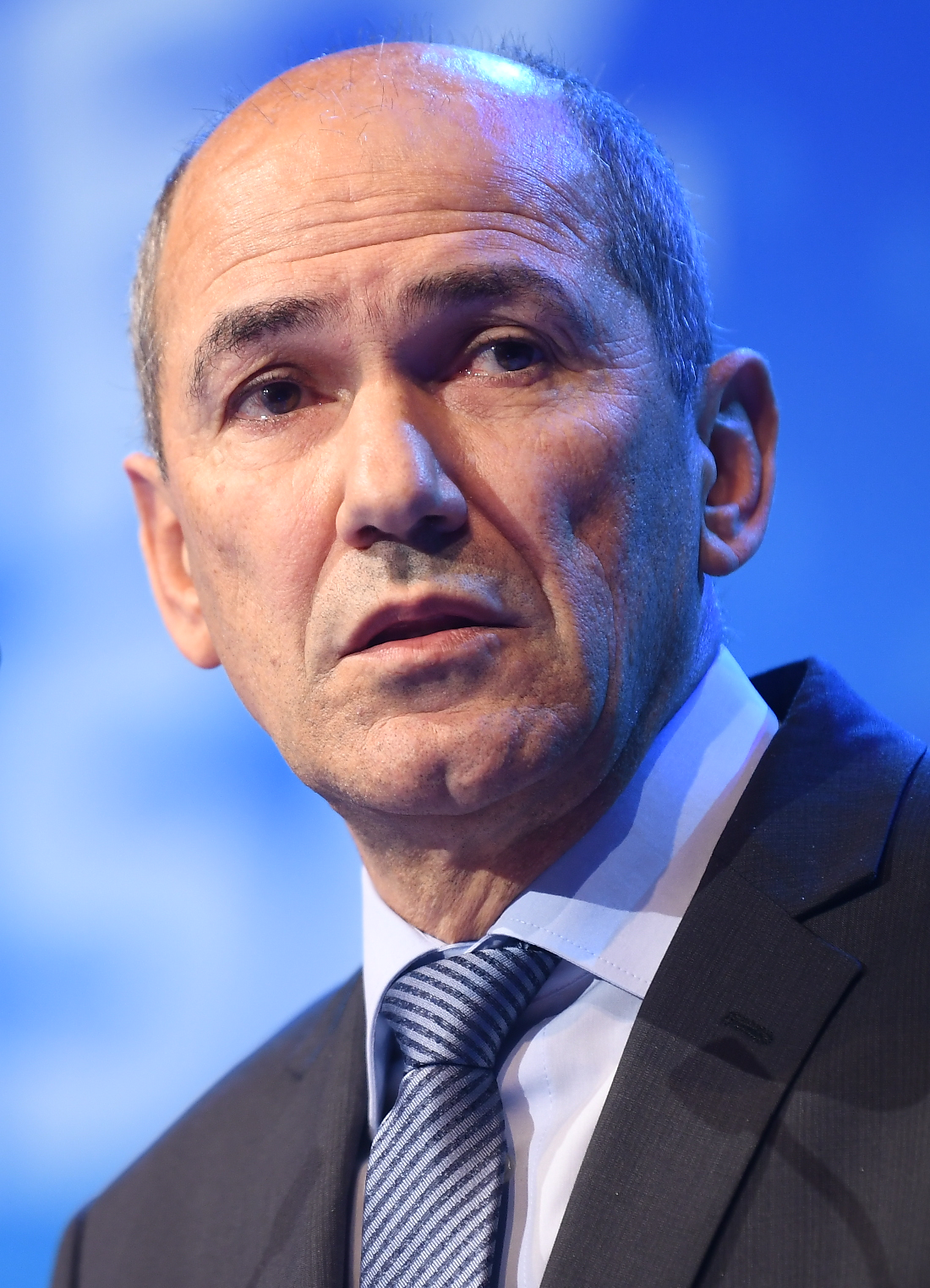
Janez Janša

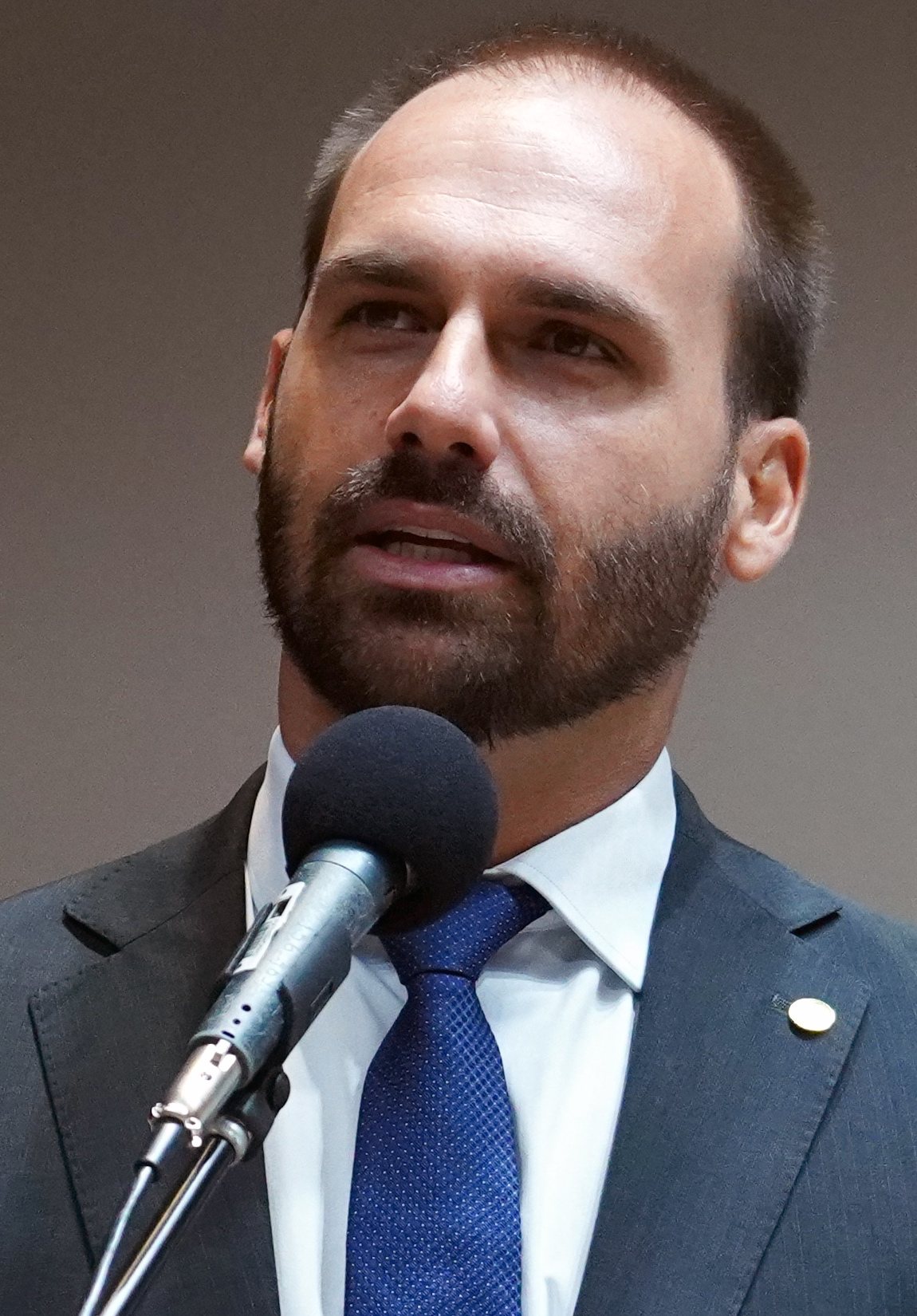
Eduardo Bolsonaro

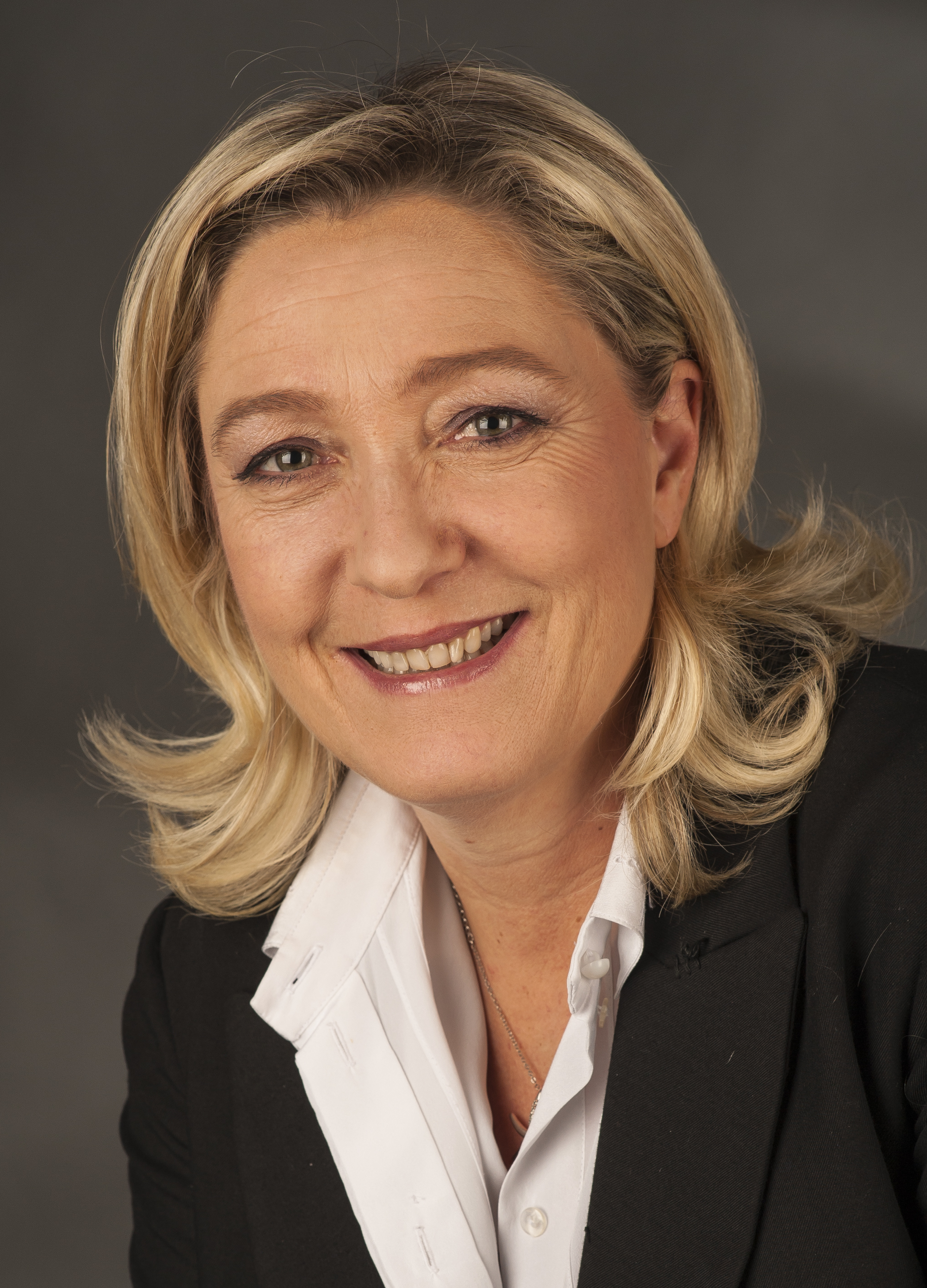
Marine Le Pen

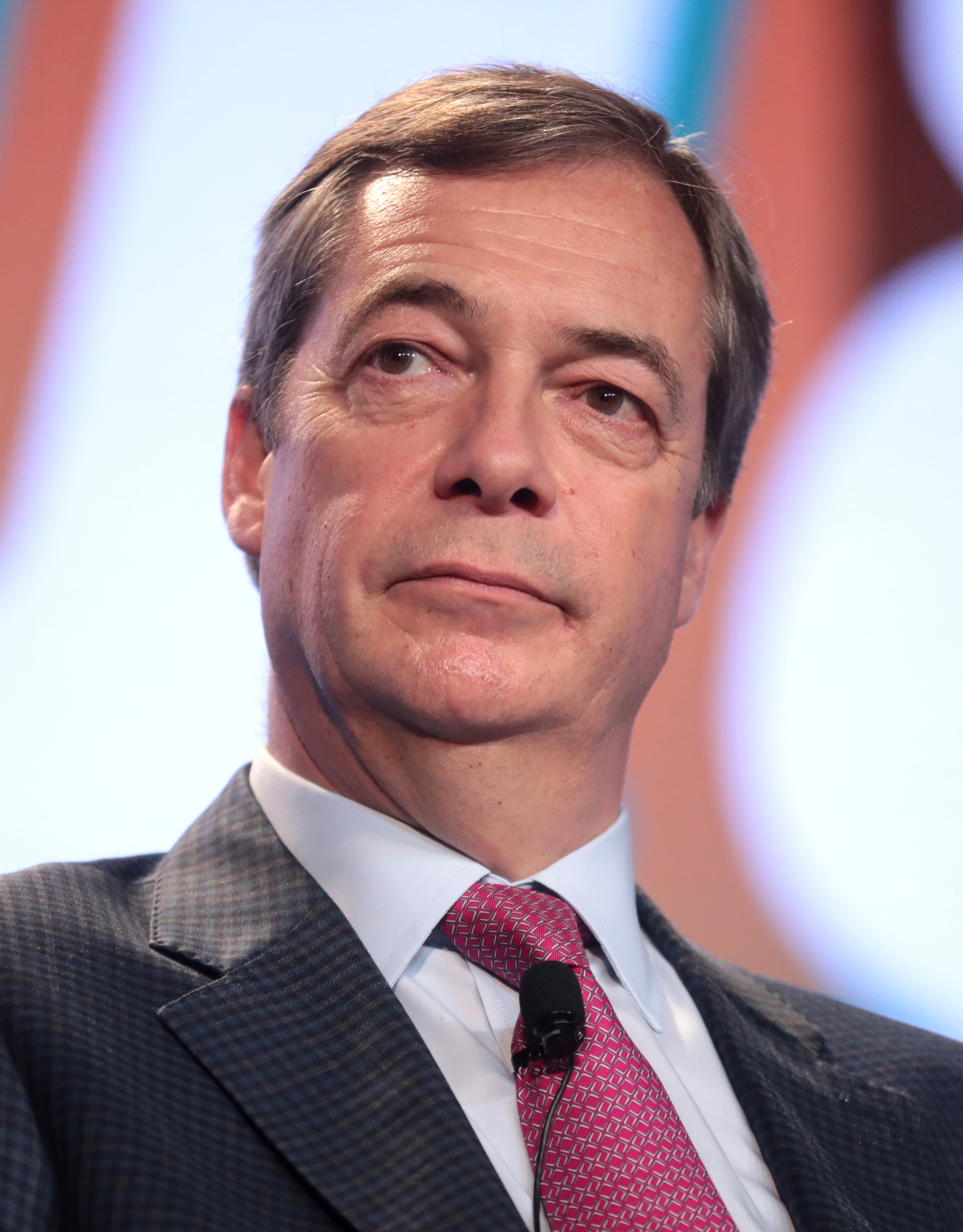
Nigel Farage

=== Heads of state and government ===
==== Current ====
- Jair Bolsonaro, President of Brazil (2019–2022) (Independent)
- Muhammadu Buhari, President of Nigeria (1983–1985, 2015–2023) (All Progressives Congress)
- Milorad Dodik, Serb Member of the Presidency of Bosnia and Herzegovina (2018–2022) (Alliance of Independent Social Democrats)
- Andrzej Duda, President of Poland (2015–2025) (Law and Justice)
- Rodrigo Duterte, President of the Philippines (2016–2022) (PDP–Laban)
- Janez Janša, Prime Minister of Slovenia (2004–2008, 2012–2013, 2020–2022) (Slovenian Democratic Party)
- Narendra Modi, Prime Minister of India (2014–present) (Bharatiya Janata Party)
- Viktor Orbán, Prime Minister of Hungary (1998–2002, 2010–2026) (Fidesz)
- Aleksandar Vučić, President of Serbia (2017–present) (Serbian Progressive Party)

==== Former ====
- Tony Abbott, Prime Minister of Australia (2013–2015) (Liberal Party)

=== Other executive officials ===
==== Current ====
- Ivica Dačić, Deputy Prime Minister of Serbia (2014–2020), Minister of Foreign Affairs (2014–2020) and President of the Socialist Party of Serbia
- Aryeh Deri, Israeli Minister for the Development of the Periphery, the Negev and the Galilee (2015–2021), Minister of the Interior (2016–2021), Minister of Internal Affairs (1988–1992, 1993), Minister without Portfolio (1993), Minister of the Economy (2015), Minister of Religious Services (2018) and Leader of Shas
- Alexander Downer, Minister for Foreign Affairs (1996–2007), High Commissioner of Australia to the United Kingdom (2014–2018) and member of the Australian Parliament for Mayo (1984–2008) (Liberal Party)
- Jarosław Kaczyński, Deputy Prime Minister of Poland (2020–2023), Prime Minister of Poland (2006–2007) (Law and Justice)

==== Former ====
- Femi Fani-Kayode, Nigerian Minister of Culture and Tourism (2006) and Minister of Aviation (2006–2007) (Peoples Democratic Party)
- Barnaby Joyce, Deputy Prime Minister of Australia (2017–2018) (National Party)
- Guillermo Moreno, Secretary of Domestic Trade of Argentina (2006–2013) (Principles and Values)
- Matteo Salvini, Deputy Prime Minister of Italy (2018–2019) (League)
- Vojislav Šešelj, Deputy Prime Minister of Serbia (1998–2000) (Serbian Radical Party)
- Ayelet Shaked, Israeli Minister of Justice (2015–2019) (New Right)

=== Members of national and supranational parliaments ===
==== Current ====
- Per-Willy Amundsen, Minister of Justice of Norway (2016–2018) and member of the Norwegian Parliament (2005–2013, 2017–present) (Progress Party)
- Gerolf Annemans, Belgian Member of the European Parliament (2014–present) (Vlaams Belang)
- Jordan Bardella, French Member of the European Parliament (2019–present) (National Rally)
- Thierry Baudet, member of the Dutch House of Representatives (Forum for Democracy)
- Conrad Black, member of the House of Lords (2002–2024) and media mogul
- Eduardo Bolsonaro, member of the Brazilian Chamber of Deputies (2015–present), Chamber Leader for the Social Liberal Party (2019–2020) and son of President Jair Bolsonaro
- María Fernanda Cabal, member of the Senate of Colombia (2018–present)
- Kristian Thulesen Dahl, member of the Danish Folketing (1994–present) (Danish People's Party)
- Giovanni Donzelli, member of the Italian Chamber of Deputies (2018–present) (Brothers of Italy)
- Nicolas Dupont-Aignan, member of the French National Assembly for Essonne's 8th constituency (1997–present) and President of Debout la France (2008–present)
- Vojtěch Filip, member of the Chamber of Deputies of the Czech Republic (1996–present) (Communist Party of Bohemia and Moravia)
- Tom Van Grieken, member of the Belgian Chamber of Representatives (2019–present) (Vlaams Belang)
- Armin-Paul Hampel, member of the German Bundestag (2017–present) (Alternative for Germany)
- Hermann Tertsch, Member of the European Parliament (2019–present) (Vox)
- Iván Espinosa de los Monteros, Spokesperson of the Vox Parliamentary Group in the Spanish Congress of Deputies (2019–present) (Vox)
- Paul Girvan, Member of Parliament for South Antrim in the House of Commons of the United Kingdom (2017–present) (Democratic Unionist Party)
- Catherine Griset, French Member of the European Parliament (2019–present) (National Rally)
- Damir Kajin, member of the Croatian Sabor (1992–present) (Istrian Democrats)
- Ulf Leirstein, member of the Norwegian Storting (2005–present) (Independent)
- Marine Le Pen, member of the French National Assembly for Pas-de-Calais's 11th constituency (2017–present) and President of National Rally (2011–present)
- Carlos Felipe Mejía, member of the Senate of Colombia (2014–present)
- Kenneth Meshoe, member of the National Assembly of South Africa (1994–present) and Leader of the African Christian Democratic Party (1993–present)
- Stefano Mugnai, member of the Italian Chamber of Deputies (2018–present) (Forza Italia)
- Mika Niikko, member of the Parliament of Finland for Uusimaa (2011–present) (Finns Party)
- Tomio Okamura, member of the Chamber of Deputies of the Czech Republic (2013–present) (Freedom and Direct Democracy)
- Peter Osuský, member of the Slovak National Council (2010–present) (Freedom and Solidarity)
- Ian Paisley Jr, Member of Parliament for North Antrim in the House of Commons of the United Kingdom (2010–present), and son of former First Minister of Northern Ireland Ian Paisley (Democratic Unionist Party)
- Antonio Palmieri, member of the Italian Chamber of Deputies (2018–present) (Forza Italia)
- Don Plett, Leader of the Opposition in the Senate of Canada (2019–present) (Conservative)
- Stéphane Ravier, member of the French Senate for Bouches-du-Rhône (2014–present) (National Rally)
- Jérôme Rivière, French Member of the European Parliament (2019–present) (National Rally)
- Jan Skopeček, member of the Chamber of Deputies of the Czech Republic (2017–present) (Civic Democratic Party)
- Achille Totaro, member of the Italian Senate (2018–present) (Brothers of Italy)
- Tsai Yi-Yu, member of the Legislative Yuan (2016–present) (Democratic Progressive Party)
- Juan David Vélez, member of the Chamber of Representatives of Colombia (2014–present)
- Sammy Wilson, Member of Parliament for East Antrim in the House of Commons of the United Kingdom (2005–present) (Democratic Unionist Party)
- Pierantonio Zanettin, member of the Italian Chamber of Deputies (2018–present) (previously endorsed Michael Bloomberg, Forza Italia)

==== Former ====
- Lynn Beyak, member of the Senate of Canada from Ontario (2013–2021)
- Haim Drukman, member of the Israeli Knesset (1977–1988, 1999–2003) (National Religious Party)
- Nigel Farage, British right-wing populist politician, leader of the Brexit Party, former leader of UKIP and former Member of the European Parliament (Brexit Party since 2019)
- Paolo Guzzanti, member of the Italian Chamber of Deputies (2008–2013), member of the Italian Senate from Latium (2006–2008) and Lombardy (1994–2006)
- Carl I. Hagen, Vice President of the Norwegian Storting (2005–2009), member of the Storting for Oslo (1974–1977; 1981–2009) and leader of the Progress Party (1978–2006)
- Hillel Horowitz, member of the Israeli Knesset (2013–2015) (The Jewish Home)
- José Antonio Kast, member of the Chamber of Deputies of Chile from District 30 (2002–2014) and District 24 (2014–2018) (Republican Party)
- Milan Krajniak, member of the Slovak National Council (2016–2020) (We Are Family)
- František Mikloško, member of the Slovak National Council (1990–2010) (Conservative Democrats of Slovakia)
- Vladimír Palko, member of the Slovak National Council (1998–2002, 2006–2010) (Conservative Democrats of Slovakia)
- Ciro Roza, member of the Legislative Assembly of Santa Catarina (2011–2015) (Social Democratic Party)

=== Local officials ===
==== Current ====
- Yossi Dagan, Israeli politician, Chair of the Shomron Regional Council (2015–present) (Likud)
- Mike Sonko, Governor of Nairobi (2017–present) and member of the Kenyan National Assembly (2010–2013) (Jubilee Party)
- László Toroczkai, Mayor of Ásotthalom (2013–present) and President of Our Homeland Movement

==== Former ====
- Dragan Marković, Mayor of Jagodina (2004–2012) and leader of United Serbia

=== Party officials ===
==== Current ====
- Billy Te Kahika, leader of the New Zealand Public Party (2020–2021)

== Party officials ==
=== Current ===
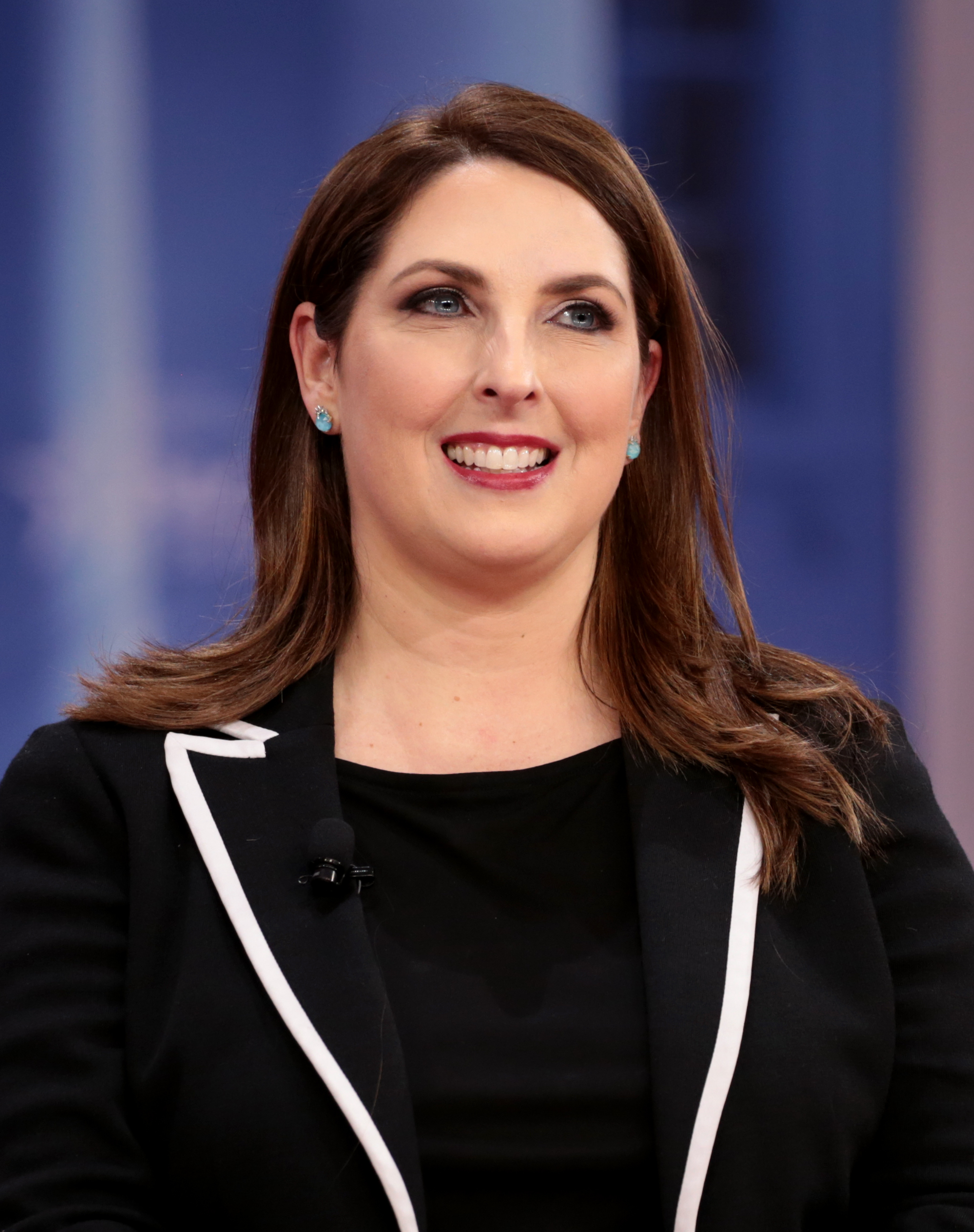
Ronna McDaniel

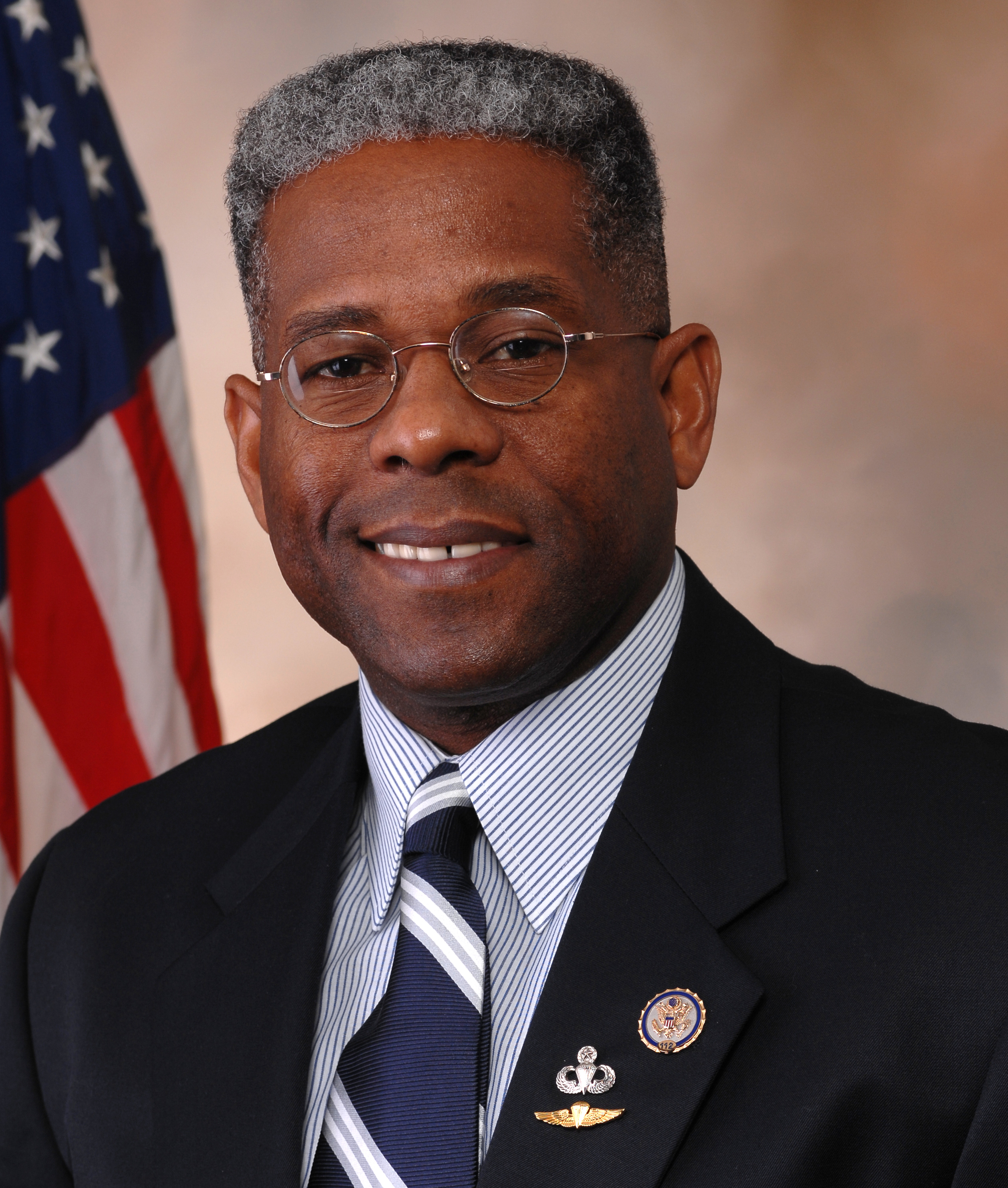
Allen West

- James Ada, Chair of the Northern Mariana Islands Republican Party (2014–present)
- Rich Anderson, Chair of the Virginia Republican Party (2020–present) and member of the Virginia House of Delegates from District 51 (2011–2018)
- Robin Armstrong, National Committeeman of the Republican National Committee in Texas (2012–present) and physician
- David Bossie, National Committeeman of the Republican National Committee in Maryland (2016–present), president of Citizens United and former deputy campaign manager to the Donald Trump presidential campaign
- M. Jane Brady, Chair of the Delaware Republican Party (2019–present) and Attorney General of Delaware (1995–2005)
- Jennifer Carnahan, Chair of the Minnesota Republican Party (2017–present)
- Andrea Catsimatidis, Chair of the Manhattan Republican Party (2017–present) and socialite
- Jim Christiana, Chair of the Republican Committee of Beaver County (2019–present)
- Laura Cox, Chair of the Michigan Republican Party (2019–present) and member of the Michigan House of Representatives from District 19 (2015–2019)
- Harmeet Dhillon, National Committeewoman of the Republican National Committee for California (2016–present) and lawyer
- Joe Gruters, Chair of the Florida Republican Party (2019–present), member of the Florida Senate from District 23 (2018–present), and member of the Florida House of Representatives from District 73 (2016–2018)
- Marti Halverson, National Committeewoman of the Republican National Committee in Wyoming (2012–present)
- Thomas Hicks Jr., Co-chair of the Republican National Committee (2019–present)
- Robert J. Kabel, National Committeeman of the Republican National Committee in the District of Columbia (2016–present) and chair of the Log Cabin Republicans
- Jeff Kaufmann, Chair of the Iowa Republican Party (2014–present) and member of the Iowa House of Representatives from District 79 (2005–2013)
- Kimberly Klacik, member of the Baltimore County Republican Central Committee (2018–present) and 2020 Republican nominee for the U.S. House for Maryland's 7th district
- Lori Klein Corbin, National Committeewoman of the Republican National Committee in Arizona (2016–present) and member of the Arizona Senate from Arizona's 6th District (2011–2013)
- Debra Lamm, National Committeewoman of the Republican National Committee in Montana (2020–present), Chair of the Montana Republican Party (2017–2019) and member of the Montana House of Representatives from District 60 (2015–2017)
- Nick Langworthy, Chair of the New York Republican Party (2019–present) and Chair of the Erie County Republican Party (2010–2019)
- Terry Lathan, Chair of the Alabama Republican Party (2015–present)
- Dan Lederman, Chair of the South Dakota Republican Party (2017–present), member of the South Dakota Senate from District 16 (2011–2015) and member of the South Dakota House of Representatives from District 16 (2009–2011)
- Leora Levy, National Committeewoman of the Republican National Committee in Connecticut (2016–present)
- James Lyons Jr, Chair of the Massachusetts Republican Party (2019–present) and member of the Massachusetts House of Representatives from Essex District 18 (2011–2019)
- Meshawn Maddock, Chair of the 11th Congressional District Republican Committee (2019–present)
- Ronna McDaniel, Co-chair of Republican National Committee (2017–present) and Chair of the Michigan Republican Party (2015–2017)
- David McLain, Chair of the Oklahoma Republican Party (2019–present)
- Steve Pearce, Chair of the New Mexico Republican Party (2018–present) and U.S. Representative from NM-02 (2011–2019)
- Pam Pollard, National Committeewoman of the Republican National Committee in Oklahoma (2020–present) and Chair of the Oklahoma Republican Party (2015–2019)
- Todd Ricketts, Finance Chair of the Republican National Committee (2019–present) and co-owner of the Chicago Cubs
- Tim Schneider, Chair of the Illinois Republican Party (2014–present)
- David Shafer, Chair of the Georgia Republican Party (2019–present), president pro tempore of the Georgia Senate (2013–2019) and member of the Georgia Senate from District 48 (2002–2019)
- Shawn Steel, National Committeeman of the Republican National Committee in California (2008–present)
- Stephen Stepanek, Chair of the New Hampshire Republican Party (2019–present)
- Joshua Tardy, National Committeeman of the Republican National Committee in Maine (2019–present), Minority Leader of the Maine House of Representatives (2006–2010) and member of the Maine House of Representatives from District 25 (2004–2010) and District 125 (2002–2004)
- Jane Timken, Chair of the Ohio Republican Party (2017–present)
- Christine Toretti, National Committeewoman of the Republican National Committee in Pennsylvania (1997–present), businesswoman and philanthropist
- Alex Triantafilou, Chair of the Hamilton County Republican Party (2008–present)
- Kelli Ward, Chair of the Arizona Republican Party (2019–present) and member of the Arizona Senate from District 5 (2013–2015)
- Allen West, Chair of the Texas Republican Party (2020–2021Ğ) and U.S. Representative from FL-22 (2011–2013)
- Art Wittich, National Committeeman of the Republican in Montana (2016–present)
- Solomon Yue, National Committeeman of the Republican in Oregon (2000–present)

=== Former ===
- Robert R. Asher, National Committeeman of the Republican National Committee in Pennsylvania (1998–2020) and Chair of the Pennsylvania Republican Party (1983–1986)
- David Barton, Vice Chair of the Texas Republican Party (1997–2006)
- James Bopp Jr, National Committeeman of the Republican National Committee in Indiana (2006–2012) and Vice Chairman of the Republican National Committee (2008–2012)
- Eli Bremer, Chair of the El Paso County Republican Party (2011–2013)
- Chad Connelly, Chair of the South Carolina Republican Party (2011–2013)
- Brad Courtney, Chair of the Wisconsin Republican Party (2011–2019)
- Edward F. Cox, Chair of the New York Republican Party (2009–2019)
- Katon Dawson, Chair of the South Carolina Republican Party (2002–2009)
- James Dickey, Chair of the Texas Republican Party (2017–2020)
- Ada Fisher, National Committeewoman of the Republican National Committee in North Carolina (2008–2020)
- Robert Graham, Chair of the Arizona Republican Party (2013–2017)
- Bill Harris, Chair of the Alabama Republican Party (1977–1985)
- Jonathan Lines, Chair of the Arizona Republican Party (2018–2019)
- Ed Martin, Chair of the Missouri Republican Party (2013–2015)
- Bob Paduchik, Co-chair of the Republican National Committee (2017–2019)
- Jo Rae Perkins, Chair of the Linn County Republican Party (2009–2012)
- Ralph Reed, Chair of the Georgia Republican Party (2001–2003)
- Bobby Schostak, Chair of the Michigan Republican Party (2011–2015)
- Doug Steinhardt, Chair of the New Jersey Republican Party (2017–2021)
- Allen Weh, Chair of the New Mexico Republican Party (2004–2009)
- Thomas Wright, Chair of the Utah Republican Party (2011–2013)
- Steve Wynn, Finance Chair of the Republican National Committee (2017–2018) real estate businessman and art collector

== Organizations ==
=== State and territorial political parties ===
- Alabama Republican Party
- Alaska Republican Party
- Arizona Republican Party
- Arkansas Republican Party
- California Republican Party
- Colorado Republican Party
- Conservative Party of New York State
- Connecticut Republican Party
- Delaware Republican Party
- Florida Republican Party
- Georgia Republican Party
- Guam Republican Party
- Hawaii Republican Party
- Idaho Republican Party
- Illinois Republican Party
- Indiana Republican Party
- Iowa Republican Party
- Kansas Republican Party
- Kentucky Republican Party
- Louisiana Republican Party
- Maine Republican Party
- Maryland Republican Party
- Massachusetts Republican Party
- Michigan Republican Party
- Minnesota Republican Party
- Mississippi Republican Party
- Missouri Republican Party
- Montana Republican Party
- Nebraska Republican Party
- Nevada Republican Party
- New Hampshire Republican Party
- New Jersey Republican Party
- New Mexico Republican Party
- New York Republican Party
- New York State Right to Life Party
- North Carolina Republican Party
- North Dakota Republican Party
- Northern Mariana Islands Republican Party
- Ohio Republican Party
- Oklahoma Republican Party
- Oregon Republican Party
- Pennsylvania Republican Party
- Rhode Island Republican Party
- South Carolina Republican Party
- South Dakota Republican Party
- Tennessee Republican Party
- Texas Republican Party
- Utah Republican Party
- Virgin Islands Republican Party
- Virginia Republican Party
- West Virginia Republican Party
- Wisconsin Republican Party
- Wyoming Republican Party

=== Local political parties ===
- Cook County Republican Party
- Palos Township Republican Organization
- Republican Party of Eau Claire County
- Shelby County Republican Party (Alabama)
- Shelby County Republican Party (Tennessee)
- Travis County Republican Party

=== International political parties ===
Vox

- Conservative People's Party of Estonia
- Miroslav Škoro Homeland Movement
- Taiwan Solidarity Union
- ~~Taliban~~ (endorsement rejected by Trump)
- United Serbia
- Vox

== See also ==
- List of Republicans who opposed the Donald Trump 2020 presidential campaign
- Endorsements in the 2020 Republican Party presidential primaries
- List of Donald Trump 2016 presidential campaign endorsements
- List of former Trump administration officials who endorsed Joe Biden
- List of Joe Biden 2020 presidential campaign endorsements
- List of Jo Jorgensen 2020 presidential campaign endorsements
- List of Howie Hawkins 2020 presidential campaign endorsements
- News media endorsements in the 2020 United States presidential primaries
