= Donald Trump 2020 presidential campaign =

American political campaign

Donald Trump for President 2020
- Campaign: 2020 Republican primaries; 2020 U.S. presidential election
- Candidate: Donald Trump 45th President of the United States (2017–2021); Mike Pence 48th Vice President of the United States (2017–2021)
- Affiliation: Republican Party
- Status: Announced: June 18, 2019 (Note: Informally announced on February 17, 2017); Secured nomination: March 17, 2020; Official nominee: August 24, 2020; Election day: November 3, 2020; Projected defeat: November 7, 2020; Formally conceded: January 7, 2021; Left office: January 20, 2021
- Headquarters: Arlington, Virginia
- Key people: Bill Stepien (campaign manager); Michael Glassner (campaign committee manager); Tim Murtaugh (communications director); Kayleigh McEnany (national press secretary, 2019–2020; senior adviser, Oct 2020–2021); Hogan Gidley (national press secretary); Lara Trump (senior consultant); Brad Parscale (senior advisor, digital/data strategies, until 2020); Kimberly Guilfoyle (senior adviser); Jenna Ellis (senior legal adviser); Harmeet Dhillon (legal adviser); Katrina Pierson (senior adviser); Bill Shine (senior adviser); John McEntee (senior adviser); Jason Miller (senior adviser); Marc Lotter (strategic communications director); Steven Cheung (communications consultant); Boris Epshteyn (strategic advisor); John Pence (campaign committee deputy executive director); Bradley Crate (campaign treasurer) Cole Blocker (finance director); Megan Powers (administrative operations director); Chris Carr (political director); Justin Clark (senior political adviser); Cliff Sims (speechwriter)
- Receipts: US$811,898,514.36 (October 14, 2020)
- Slogans: Make America Great Again; Keep America Great!; Promises made, promises kept; Jobs! Jobs! Jobs!; Keep America Working

Website
- www.donaldjtrump.com (archived - October 1, 2020)

Donald Trump, a member of the Republican Party, sought re-election in the 2020 United States presidential election. He was inaugurated as president of the United States on January 20, 2017, and filed for re-election with the Federal Election Commission (FEC) on the same day. This was Trump's third run for President, his second with the Republican Party, and the only campaign Trump ran as an incumbent.

Trump began his re-election campaign unusually early for an incumbent president, beginning to spend money on the re-election effort within weeks of his election. From February 2017 onward, Trump held more than 150 rallies and fundraisers for this campaign, visiting key electoral states. The campaign also raised funds and ran two nationwide advertising campaigns. Trump said in several stump speeches that the slogans for the 2020 race would be "Keep America Great" and "Promises Made, Promises Kept". On November 7, 2018, Trump confirmed that Mike Pence would be his vice presidential running mate in 2020.

Trump's 2020 re-election bid was ultimately unsuccessful; the Democratic Party ticket of Joe Biden and Kamala Harris won the 2020 election. This marked the first time since 1992 that an incumbent president lost re-election. Trump refused to accept the results; he and his allies made disproven claims of fraud, pressured elections officials, filed several unsuccessful lawsuits, and directly attempted to overturn the results at the county, state, and federal level. This culminated in the attack on the United States Capitol on January 6, 2021, for which Trump was impeached a second time. The day after the attack, Trump stated that a "new administration" would be succeeding his, without mentioning president-elect Biden by name, in a video posted on Twitter.

Had Trump been re-elected to a second consecutive term, he would have been the first Republican to win two consecutive presidential elections since George W. Bush in 2004. He would also have been the oldest U.S. president to be elected president twice at the age of 74 years, 4 months, and 20 days, surpassing Ronald Reagan in 1984. If he had won in 2020, he would not have been eligible to run again in 2024 due to term limits set by the 22nd Amendment to the United States Constitution. Trump did subsequently run for a re-election campaign four years later in 2024. He was successfully elected to a second, non-consecutive term as the 47th president of the United States in 2024 with JD Vance as his running mate.

== Background ==
Trump's predecessors merged their campaign committees into their party's committee following their election victories. Following his 2016 election victory, Trump eschewed this presidential tradition and retained a separate campaign committee which continued raising funds. In December 2016, the campaign raised $11 million. These moves indicated that Trump was already eyeing a 2020 run.

Trump started spending money on the 2020 race on November 24, 2016, (16 days after the end of the 2016 election). The earliest campaign disbursement that his committees reported was spent towards the 2020 presidential primaries was for the purchase of a Delta Air Lines ticket on this date. Trump officially filed his re-election campaign with the FEC on January 20, 2017, the day of his inauguration. Trump launched his re-election campaign earlier in his presidency than his predecessors did. Barack Obama (2012), George W. Bush (2004), Bill Clinton (1996), George H. W. Bush (1992) and Ronald Reagan (1984) all declared their candidacies for re-election in the third year of their presidencies. His successor, Joe Biden also declared his initial re-election campaign for the 2024 election in the third year of his presidency. Trump filed the papers for his re-election campaign approximately 47 months prior to the date of the election. In contrast, both Reagan and George H. W. Bush did so approximately twelve, George W. Bush approximately 18, and both Clinton and Obama approximately 19 months before those elections.

While previous presidents had held rallies in the early days of their presidency to garner support for legislation, such rallies differed from Trump's in that they were funded by the White House rather than by campaign committees. One of the advantages of having his campaign committee fund the events is that organizers can more discriminately screen attendees, refusing entry to non-supporters. Trump's February 2017 rally in Melbourne, Florida, was the earliest campaign rally for an incumbent president.

By filing for his campaign as early as he did, Trump gave himself a head start on fundraising. This theoretically helped discourage primary challengers.

Since his three predecessors (Bill Clinton, George W. Bush, and Barack Obama) had each won re-election to their second terms, had Trump been re-elected, it would have been the first time in American history that four consecutive incumbent presidents were each elected to two consecutive terms. (Note: Had Trump been re-elected, it would have been surpassed the record of Thomas Jefferson, James Madison, and James Monroe, the three consecutive incumbent presidents were each won re-elections to their second terms.)

=== Permanent campaign ===
Although Trump's early campaign filing was extraordinarily unusual, aspects of a "permanent campaign" are not entirely unprecedented in American politics. Such a phenomenon had a presence in the White House at least as early as the presidency of Bill Clinton. Under the advice of Sidney Blumenthal, Clinton's staff continued to engage in campaign methodology once in office, using polling for assistance in making decisions.

Political observers who bolster the opinion that a permanent campaign has had a significant impact on recent presidencies argue that decisions by presidents have increasingly been made with considerations to their impact on voter approval.

The concept of a permanent campaign also describes the focus which recent presidents have given to electoral concerns during their tenures in office, with the distinction between the time they have spent governing and the time they have spent campaigning having become blurred. Political observers consider the rise in presidential fundraising as a symptom of the permanent campaign.

The disproportionately large amounts of time presidents have spent visiting key electoral states (and a comparatively small amount of time they have spent visiting states that pose little electoral importance to them) has been pointed to as evidence of ulterior electoral motives influencing presidential governance, emblematic of the blurred lines between campaigning and governance in the White House. For instance, George W. Bush embarked on 416 domestic trips during his first three years in office. This was 114 more than his predecessor Bill Clinton made in his first three years. In his first year, 36% of Bush's domestic trips were to the 16 states that were considered swing states after having been decided the closest margins during the 2000 election. In his second year, 45% of his domestic travel was to these states, and his third year 39% of his domestic travel was to these states.

According to the Associated Press, a data analysis firm named Data Propria, launched in May 2018 to provide ad-targeting services and run by former officials of Cambridge Analytica, is working on public relations for the Trump 2020 re-election campaign.

=== Political positions ===
Emerging from the 2020 convention, the campaign agenda for a second term was primarily to build on the first term agenda.

As some George Floyd protests included violent incidents, Trump emphasized "law and order" as a major campaign theme, directing particular criticism at antifa. Trump and attorney general Bill Barr asserted that antifa had organized the protests, although there was no evidence to support that. Barr had also baselessly linked antifa to the Black Lives Matter movement. Three August 2020 DHS draft reports did not mention antifa as a domestic terrorism risk and ranked white supremacy as the top risk, higher than that of foreign terrorist groups. Brian Murphy — until August 2020, the DHS undersecretary for intelligence and analysis — asserted in a September 2020 whistleblower complaint that Secretary of Homeland Security Chad Wolf and his deputy Ken Cuccinelli instructed him "to modify intelligence assessments to ensure they matched up with the public comments by President Trump on the subject of ANTIFA and 'anarchist' groups" and to downplay the severity of risk associated with white supremacy. Murphy said he refused. The campaign sent a fundraising text message to supporters in September 2020 stating an "ANTIFA ALERT," continuing, "They'll attack your homes if Joe's elected."

The vilification of protesters extended to a threat to list "Antifa" (short for anti-fascism) a "designated terrorist" group. The advertisement showed an inverted red triangle as an antifa symbol. Many people saw this as offensive, because the Nazis has used the symbol on the uniforms of their political opponents in concentration camps.

Top officials tried to keep dossiers on identified protesters, whom they intended to blame for a terrorist plot that did not exist. The purpose was to help Trump win re-election.

=== Approval ratings ===
Presidential approval ratings, while rising slightly throughout the second half of his first term, have generally shown Trump to be one of the least popular presidents in the history of modern opinion polling during a presidential election year. Political observers point out that presidential job approval is highly partisan, with Gallup writing in March 2020:

The 92% approval among Republicans and 42% among independents are close to his highest ratings for those groups. Meanwhile, his approval rating among Democrats, currently 8%, hasn't been above 13% since he took office in February 2017. The current 84-point gap in approval between Republicans and Democrats is just a few points shy of the record polarization Gallup found in late January and early February.

In the midst of the COVID-19 pandemic in early spring 2020, Trump's approval rating saw a small but notable rally in support, followed by a tick-down in mid-2020. In June and July 2020, public polling showed Trump's approval significantly weakening.

==== Domestic trips made by Donald Trump as U.S. president ====
The following maps document the frequency with which Trump has visited each state and territory during his first presidency.

2017

2018

2019

2020–21
Washington, D.C.
7 or more visits
6 visits
5 visits
4 visits
3 visits
2 visits
1 visit
0 visits

== 2017 campaign developments ==
=== January 2017: launch ===
On January 10, 2017, Politico reported that Trump would be keeping his campaign offices in Trump Tower open in order to lay the groundwork for a re-election campaign. By that time his campaign offices at Trump Tower already included a staff of about ten people led by Republican strategist Michael Glassner. Glassner's deputy is John Pence, nephew of Vice President Mike Pence. The campaign staff was focused on data-building and fundraising for a 2020 re-election campaign.

On January 18, Trump revealed, in an interview with The Washington Post, that he had decided Keep America Great would be his 2020 re-election campaign slogan. Two days later, on the day of his inauguration, Trump filed a form with the Federal Election Commission (FEC) declaring that he qualified as a candidate for the 2020 presidential election.

=== February 2017: first rally ===
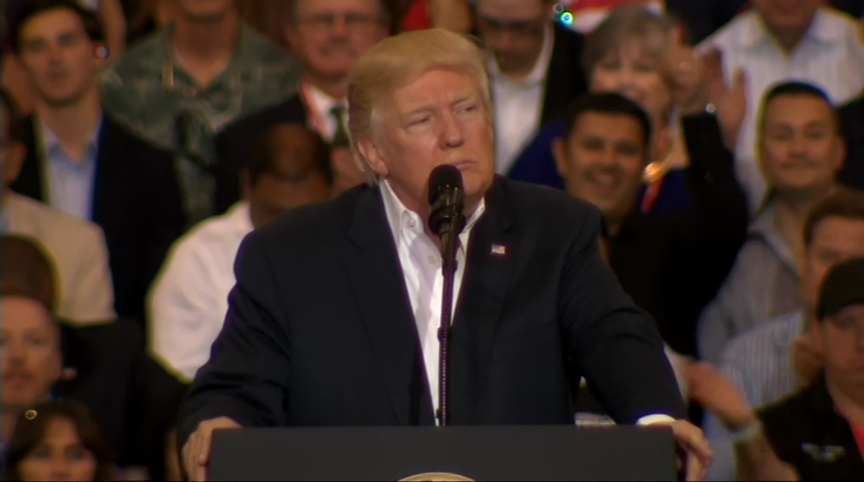
Trump speaking at his first campaign rally in Florida

By February 1, 2017, Trump's re-election campaign had already raised over $7 million.

The first rally organized by the campaign was held on February 18, 2017, in Melbourne, Florida, and was attended by an estimated 9,000 supporters. It was the earliest an incumbent president had ever held a re-election campaign rally. During the rally, Trump defended his actions and criticized the media. He referred to a nonexistent incident ("last night in Sweden ...") while criticizing the asylum policies of several European countries. After backlash from the press and the Swedish government, Trump said he was referring to a Fox News program aired the previous day.

On February 24, Trump spoke at the Conservative Political Action Conference, an annual event which has often held a presidential straw poll. However, the CPAC 2017 straw poll did not include a preference survey on presidential candidates.

=== March 2017: second and third rallies ===
On March 4, there were a series of local rallies held by allies of the campaign in some 50 cities. Several of the rallies were met by counter-demonstrations where some protesters were arrested. Other events were held around the country throughout March, some of which resulted in violence.

The campaign's second rally was held a month later in Nashville on March 15, and coincided with the 250th birthday of Andrew Jackson. Prior to the rally, Trump paid tribute to Jackson and laid a wreath at his tomb. During the rally, Trump promised to repeal the Affordable Care Act ('Obamacare') and defended his revised travel ban, which was put on hold by Derrick Watson, a federal judge in Hawaii, hours later.

A third rally was held by the campaign in Louisville on March 20. At the rally, Trump promoted efforts to repeal Obamacare.

On March 29, it was reported that Lara Trump, the president's daughter-in-law, had been hired as a consultant by the campaign's digital vendor Giles-Parscale.

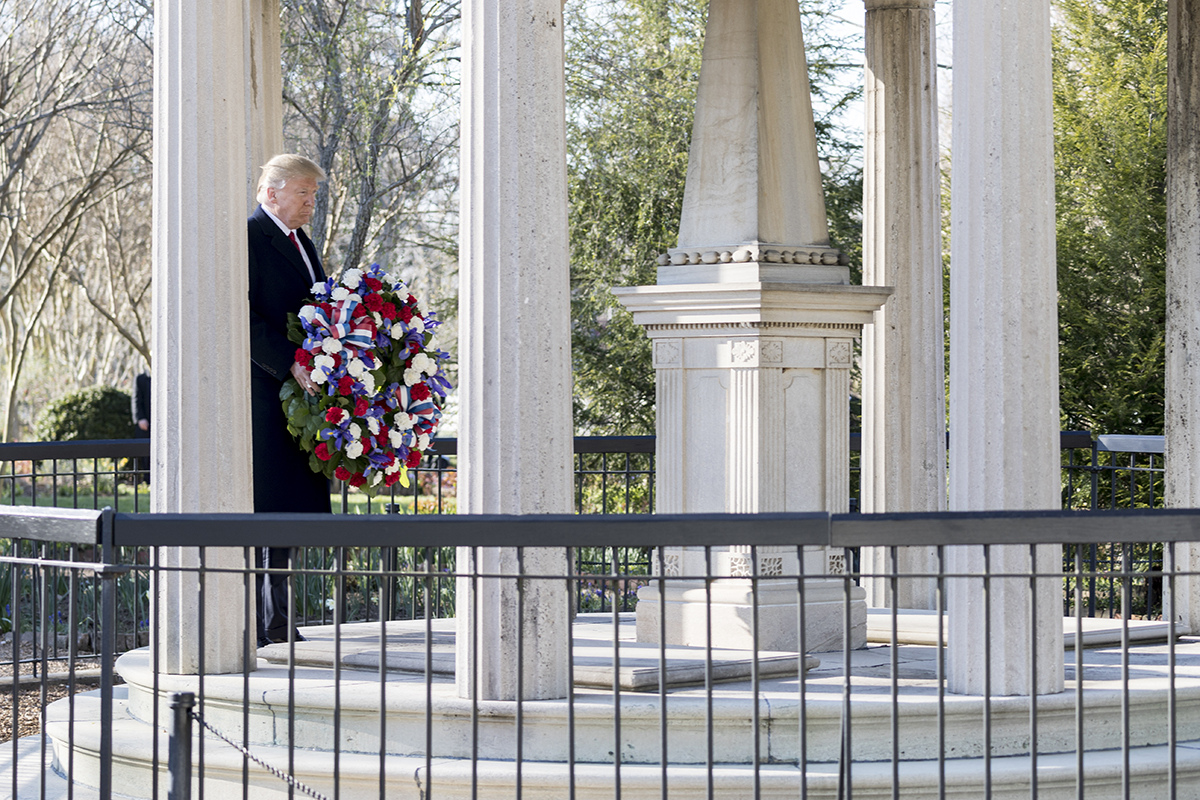
Trump laying a wreath at the tomb of Andrew Jackson at The Hermitage prior to his Nashville, Tennessee rally

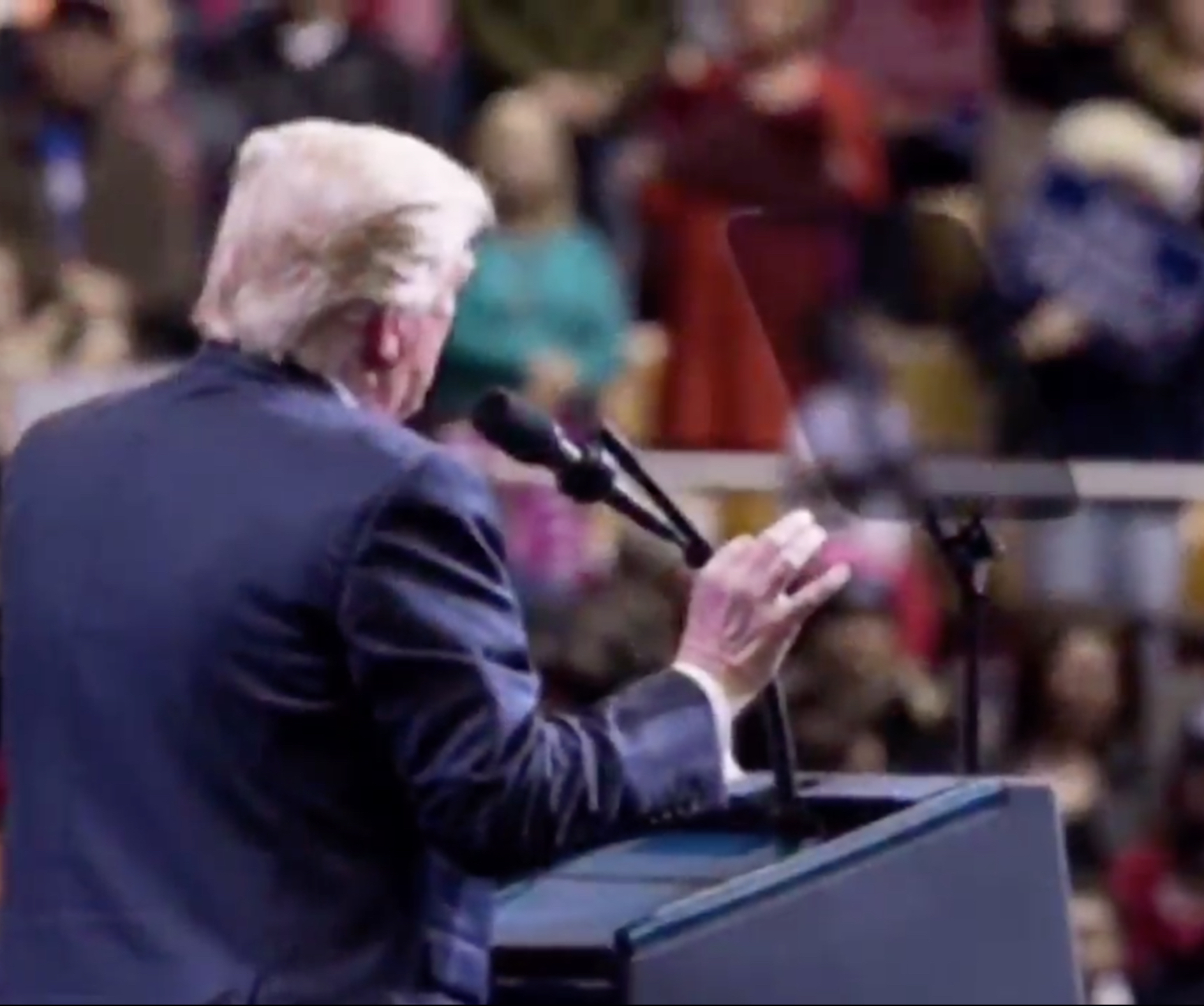
Trump speaking at his rally in Nashville, Tennessee, March 15, 2017

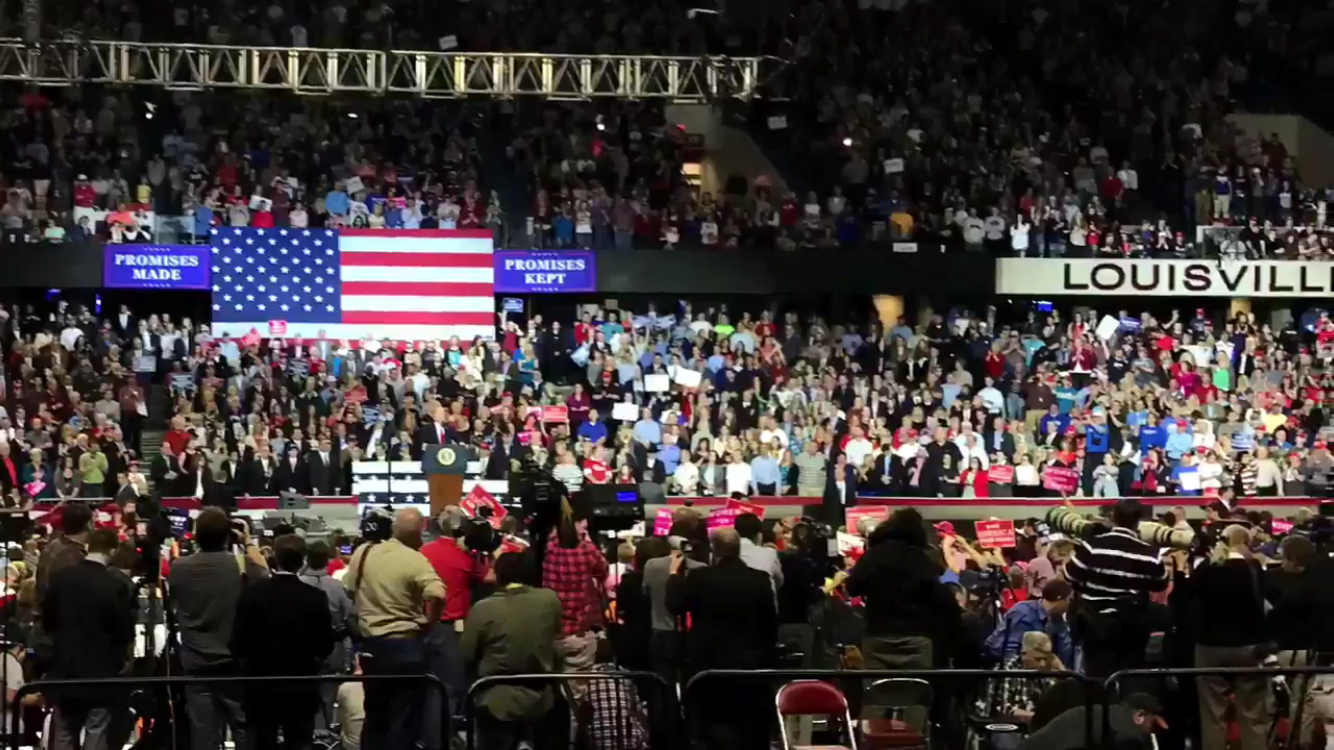
Rally in Louisville, Kentucky, March 20, 2017

=== April 2017: fourth rally ===
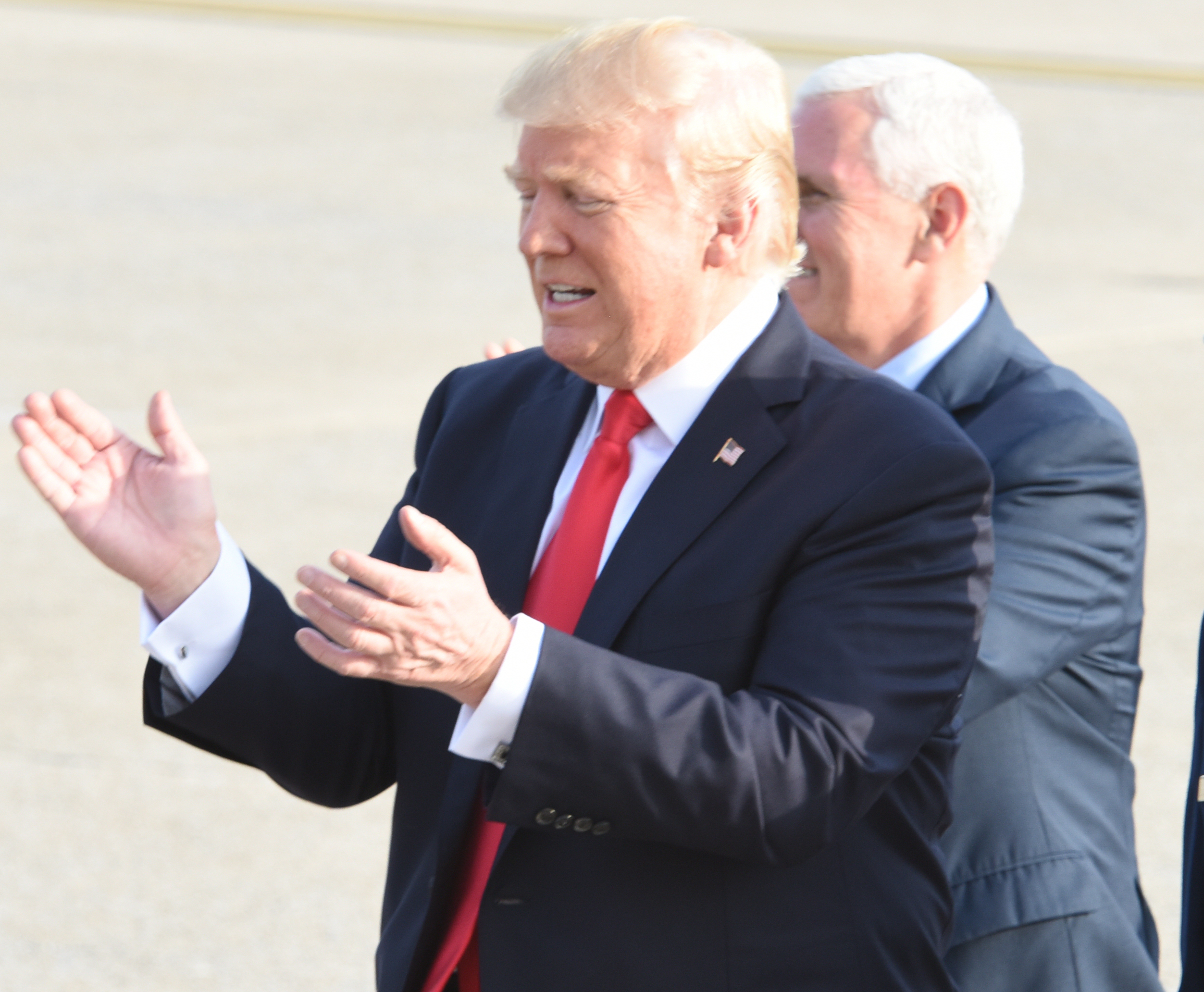
Trump and Pence arrive in Pennsylvania on April 29 for their rally in Harrisburg

By mid-April, the Trump campaign had a staff of around 20 employees.

Trump gave a speech on April 28 at an event for the National Rifle Association of America.

Trump held his fourth campaign rally on April 29 in Harrisburg, Pennsylvania, which coincided with the hundredth day of Trump's presidency. It also took place the same night as the White House Correspondents' Dinner, which Trump did not attend. In addition to Trump, Vice President Pence also spoke at the April 29 rally.

=== May 2017: launch of first advertising campaign ===
On May 1, the campaign announced that they were spending $1.5 million on national advertisements touting Trump's accomplishments in the first 100 days. The ad buy, which included advertisements targeted at voters who supported specific agenda items of Trump's presidency, came approximately 42 months before election day 2020, or any other major party's candidate declarations. FactCheck.org found several inaccuracies in the advertisement, and Eric Zorn of the Chicago Tribune described the 30-second advertisement as being, "stuffed with Trump's signature misleading puffery". Additionally, original versions of the ad showed Trump shaking hands with H. R. McMaster, an active-duty military member who was barred from participating in any political advocacy while in uniform. Subsequent airings of the advertisement substituted this clip.

The ad claimed that the "fake news" media refused to report the successes of the administration, but Forbes pointed out that the ad itself cited mainstream media sources including CNBC, The Boston Globe and The New York Times. Because of this accusation against the news media, CNN decided to stop running the ad, a decision that campaign manager Michael Glassner criticized as an action to "censor our free speech". ABC, CBS and NBC later joined CNN in refusing to play the ad. Lara Trump, a consultant to the campaign and the daughter-in-law of the president, called the ad removals "an unprecedented act of censorship in America that should concern every freedom-loving citizen".

On May 8, shortly after reporter Cecilia Vega asked White House press secretary Sean Spicer about statements that Trump's 2016 campaign had issued in regard to temporarily banning Muslims from entering the United States, Trump's campaign website purged itself of all campaign statements from the 2016 campaign. Campaign chairman Michael Glassner later announced that the website was being redesigned. The redesign of Trump's campaign website was seen by media sources as laying the groundwork for a full-bodied reelection campaign. The Washington Examiner's David Druckert pointed out on Twitter that the redesigned website featured an image of Trump with a uniformed military officer on its 'Donate' page, which violated the Department of Defense's regulation that prohibits uniformed military officers from engaging in any political activity.

On May 18, Trump hosted chairmen of the Colorado, Iowa, Michigan, New Hampshire, North Carolina, Ohio and Pennsylvania state parties at the White House. Each of their states are considered to be presidential swing states. On May 25, Trump's sons Donald Jr. and Eric, along with Eric's wife Lara, held a series of meetings at the Washington, D.C., offices of the Republican National Committee (RNC) to outline campaign strategy.

=== June 2017: fifth rally, first fundraiser and visits to swing states ===
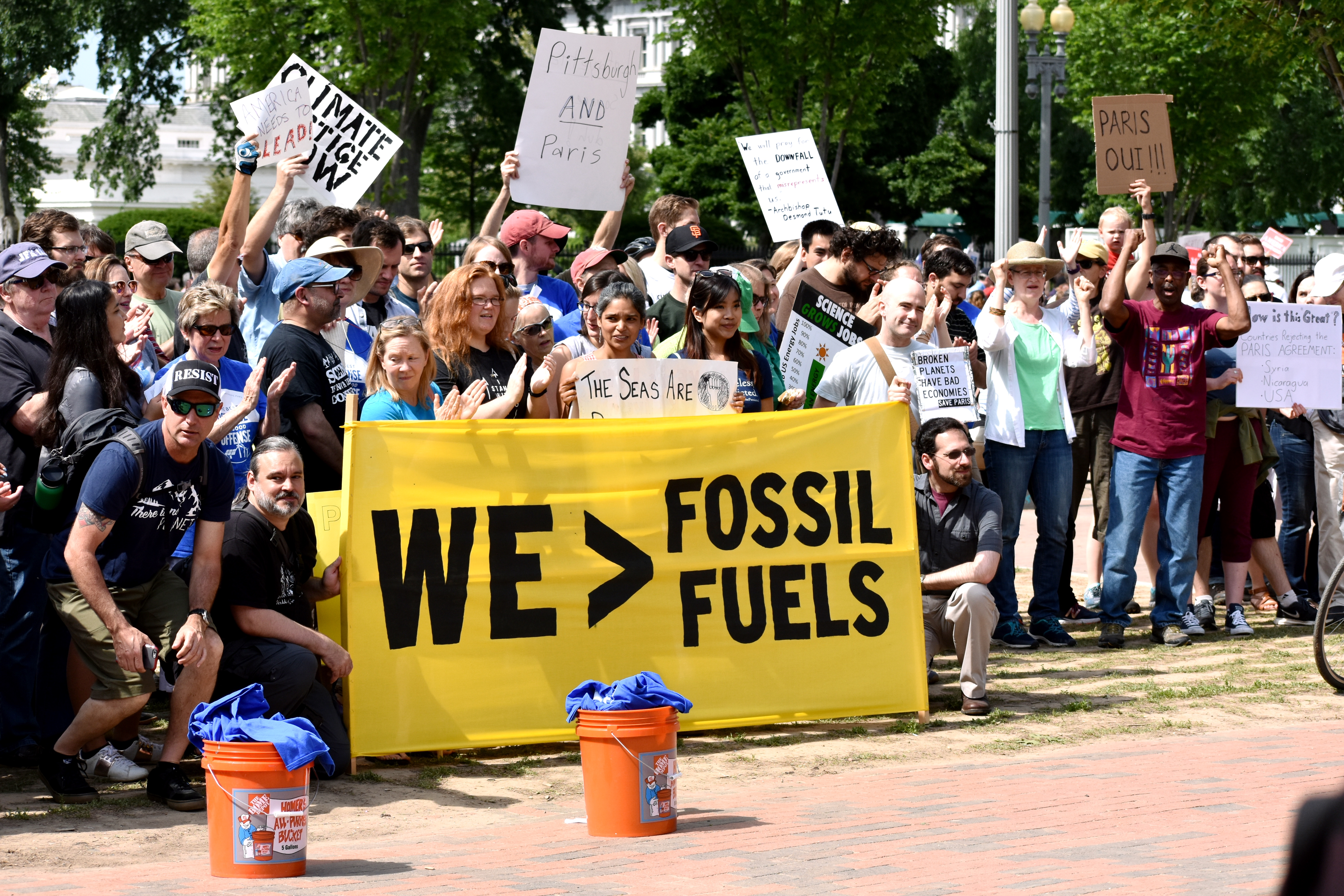
Counter-protesters at the Pittsburgh Not Paris Rally

On June 1, President Trump announced his plans to withdraw from the Paris Agreement saying, "I was elected to represent the citizens of Pittsburgh, not Paris." Soon afterwards, the campaign announced it would hold a Pittsburgh Not Paris Rally across from the White House. The rally was held June 3 at Lafayette Square. The event was sponsored by the Fairfax County Republican Committee and the Republican Party of Virginia. Relatively few people attended the event, with estimates varying from 200 people (including counter-protesters) to "dozens" of supporters. By comparison, more people attended the anti-Trump March for Truth, which was held the same day.

Trump began campaigning in Iowa in June. Iowa was considered to be a perennial swing state and the Iowa caucus is scheduled as the earliest presidential primary election. Iowa has also been home to nonbinding straw polls held ahead of the primaries (Trump won the 2015 straw poll among Republican candidates).

On June 7, Trump delivered what the New York Daily News described as a "campaign-style speech" in Cincinnati, Ohio. Five days later, reports surfaced that Trump was making plans to embark on a more expansive tour that would visit several battleground states.

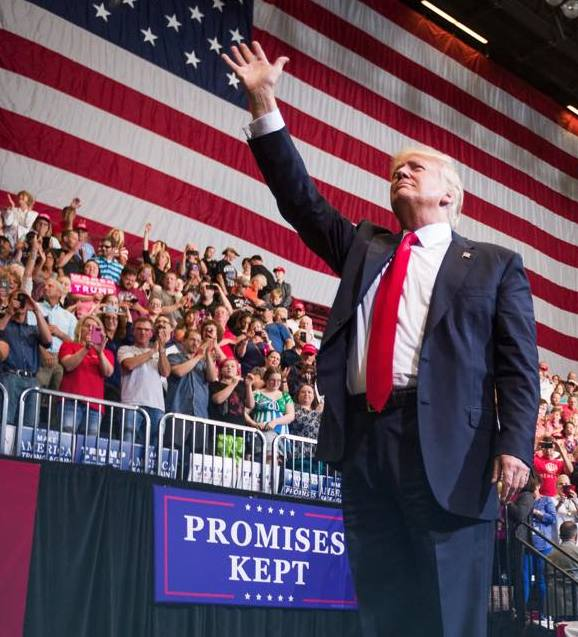
Trump in Iowa holding his fifth official rally of the campaign

Trump held his fifth official campaign rally in Cedar Rapids in eastern Iowa. The area, home to a large population of working class whites, was seen as a strong region for Trump to find a base of political support. The date for the rally, having been changed several times, was ultimately held on June 21, marking the first time in his presidency that Trump traveled west of the Mississippi River. At the rally, Iowa GOP state chairman Jeff Kaufmann verbally attacked Nebraskan senator Ben Sasse, who was speculated by some as a potential challenger to Trump in the 2020 Republican primaries.

Vice President Pence attended Joni Ernst's 3rd Annual Roast and Ride fundraiser, held on June 3 at the Central Iowa Expo near Boone, Iowa. The previous editions of this event have included presidential campaign appearances. Trump himself had previously attended Ernst's fundraiser in 2016 while campaigning in Iowa, and seven Republican presidential contenders attended the event in 2015.

On June 28, the president hosted a fundraiser at his company's hotel in Washington, D.C., benefitting the Trump Victory Committee, a joint committee that raises funds both for his reelection campaign and for the RNC. The fundraiser was the first event Trump hosted for the Victory Committee since becoming president, as well as the first presidential campaign fundraiser. The event was co-organized by RNC chairwoman Ronna Romney McDaniel and RNC National Finance Chairman Steve Wynn. The fundraiser was attended by about 300 guests and was reportedly expected to gross $10 million. Trump was joined at the event by the first lady and top White House advisors. Among those reported to have been in attendance at the fundraiser were Mica Mosbacher, Dean Heller and Katrina Pierson. Additionally, Harold Hamm and a number of high-profile figures were spotted in the hotel's lobby during the event. Press were barred from the event, a break of precedent since reporters were permitted to the first fundraisers held by each of Trump's two predecessors. Trump's decision to host the event at a venue from which he personally profits garnered criticism.

Throughout June, the president also gave speeches at events in the swing-states of Florida, Ohio, and Wisconsin.

Lara Trump made appearances on behalf of the campaign at events in New York and Texas during the month of June. In New York, Lara spoke at the Sheraton New York Times Square Hotel on June 20 for the annual New York Republican State Committee gala.

By the end of June, Trump had visited fewer states in his first six months in office compared to his two immediate predecessors, Barack Obama and George W. Bush. Both Obama and Bush had visited every time zone in the continental United States, while Trump had so far visited only the Eastern and Central time zones. Obama and Bush also took both overnight and multiple-day trips throughout the country while Trump's domestic travels had largely been limited to a two-hour flight radius of Washington, D.C., and his overnight stays were at Camp David, Mar-a-Lago and Trump National Golf Club in Bedminster. One of the benefits Trump was speculated to obtain from such trips is more favorable coverage from local news outlets in the areas visited. Most of Trump's trips to Wisconsin were focused on the Milwaukee area in the southeast part of the state, which Trump won in 2016 by a smaller margin than Mitt Romney had in 2012.

=== July 2017: sixth rally ===
On July 1, Trump delivered a speech at the John F. Kennedy Center for the Performing Arts during an event honoring veterans. The event was sponsored by First Baptist Dallas and the Salem Media Group. The event was described as resembling one of Trump's campaign rallies.

On July 6, The Hill reported that 2020 campaign merchandise bearing Trump's name (including merchandise supporting and opposing his candidacy) was selling more than those with the names of prospective opponents.

First Daughter and advisor to the president Ivanka Trump introduced Vice President Pence at a GOP fundraiser.

In its mid-July financial disbursement filing, the campaign reported that on June 27, Donald Trump Jr. made a payment to Alan Futerfas for "legal consulting" regarding his attempt to get "dirt on Clinton" in the 2016 Trump Tower meeting between him, Jared Kushner, Paul Manafort, and one or more representatives of the Russian government.

On July 24, Trump gave a highly political address at the National Scout Jamboree, a traditionally non-political event.

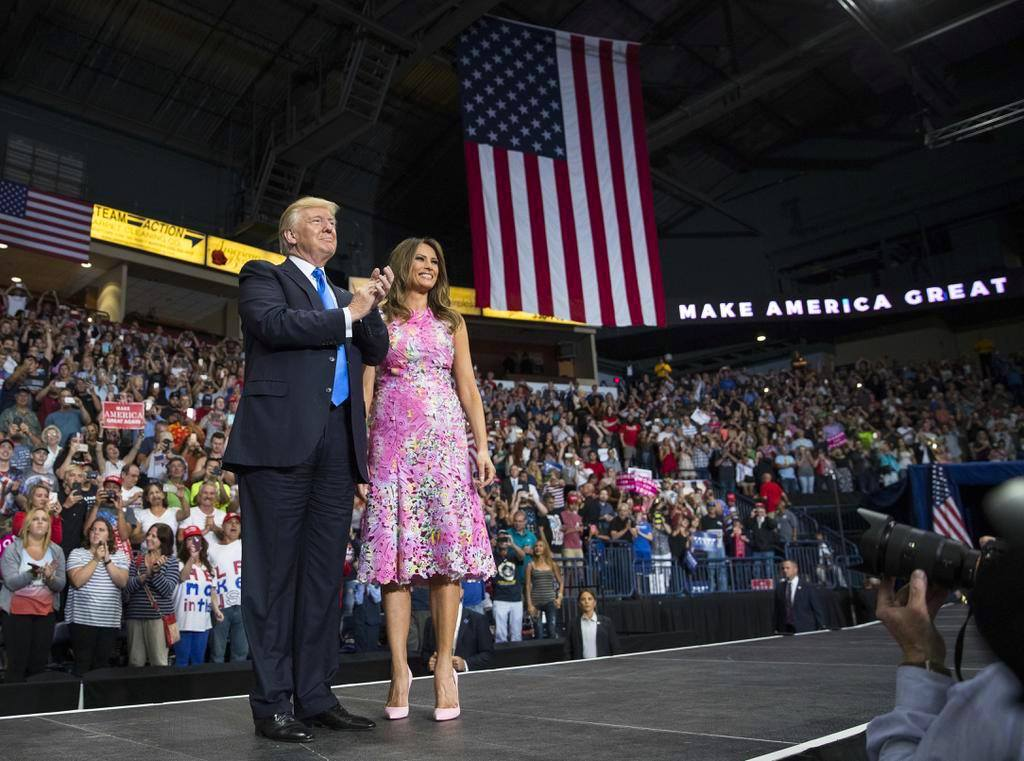
Donald and Melania Trump at the campaign's sixth rally

Trump held his sixth campaign rally on July 25 at the Covelli Centre in Youngstown, Ohio. During the speech, Trump reveled in addressing an audience outside of the national capital. He also condemned "predators and criminal aliens" and called them "animals". Chicago Tribune writer Rex W. Huppke criticized this comment, comparing it to the previous day's remarks at the National Scout Jamboree. Trump also made remarks on the homicide rate in Chicago, and called on the mayor, Rahm Emanuel, to "get tough"; Emanuel responded the following day, stating: "It is not about being tough, it's about being smart and strategic."

=== September 2017 ===
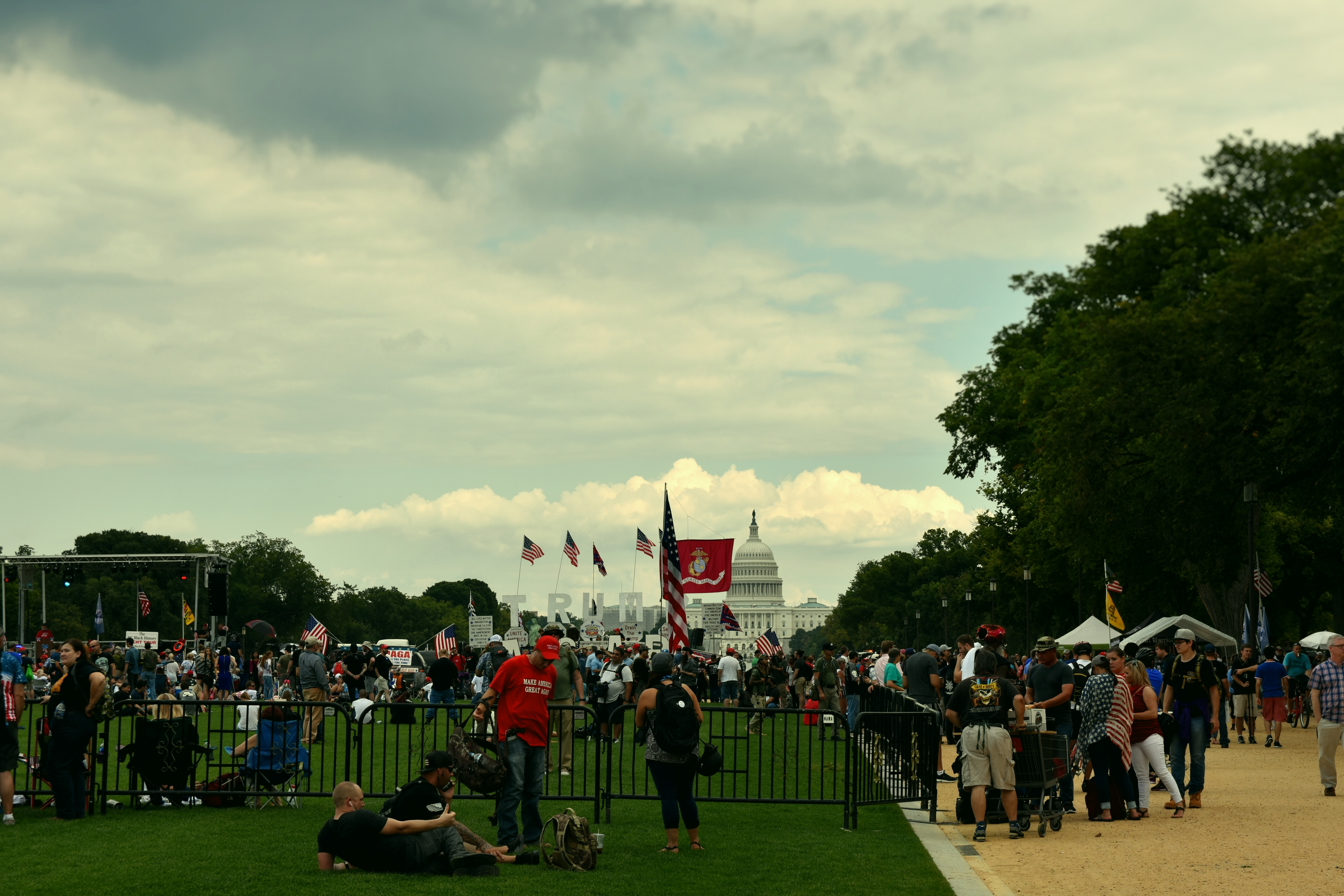
Crowd at the Mother of All Rallies

On September 16, groups supporting Trump held a rally on the National Mall named the Mother of All Rallies. Organizers were originally hoping to draw a million attendees, but in planning for security, the Metropolitan Police Department of the District of Columbia expected only 1,800. Only about a 1,000 people attended.

A national organization had originally planned to hold "We Support Trump" rallies across the nation on September 9, however subsequently reneged on those plans. However, an independent rally in support of Trump was subsequently announced to be held on that date in Georgetown, Delaware, in a county where Trump got a majority of the vote in 2016. The Georgetown rally was sponsored by the Sussex County Republican Committee and attended by over 100 people.

On September 26, Trump attended a campaign fundraising dinner hosted by the Republican National Committee in New York City. The event was reported to have raised nearly $5 million, with major donors spending up to $250,000 to dine with President Trump. Trump scheduled for a quick meeting with Nikki Haley and other U.N. officials immediately prior the fundraiser; travel expenses were reportedly filed as "government business", and therefore taxpayer-funded. Trump's pattern of mixing travel for fundraising activities with travel for government business has drawn criticism from government watchdog organizations.

Trump was scheduled to headline a fundraiser in Dallas on September 27, which was canceled by its organizers in the aftermath of Hurricane Harvey.

=== October 2017 ===
On October 16, Trump indicated his desire to see his 2016 general election opponent, Hillary Clinton, run again in 2020. Clinton had previously asserted that she had no desire to run for public office again.

On October 25, the president traveled to Texas for a fundraiser hosted by the Dallas County Republican Party for both the RNC and his reelection campaign. The event was closed to the media. Mark Knoller noted, "By my count, this will be Pres Trump's 10th political fundraiser since taking office. 9 of 10 were closed to press coverage including today."

=== November 2017 ===
In early November, ethics watchdogs and political analysts expressed concerns over Trump's daughter-in-law Lara Trump assuming a greater role in the White House, while also continuing to be an active member of Trump's reelection campaign. Lara Trump, while working for the reelection campaign, had reportedly held private political meetings with government officials such as Secretary of the Interior Ryan Zinke, Veteran Affairs Committee chairman Phil Roe and Representative Ron DeSantis.

=== December 2017 ===
In December 2017, polls showed that more than 40 percent of Americans wanted Trump impeached, reportedly higher than the percentage of Americans who said at the time that they planned to vote for him in 2020.

== 2018 campaign developments ==
=== February 2018 ===
In February 2018, the Trump campaign sent out an email with a photo of Trump paying a hospital visit to a student survivor of the Stoneman Douglas High School shooting. After stating that Trump prioritizes the safety of American students and schools, the email linked to the campaign's donations page.

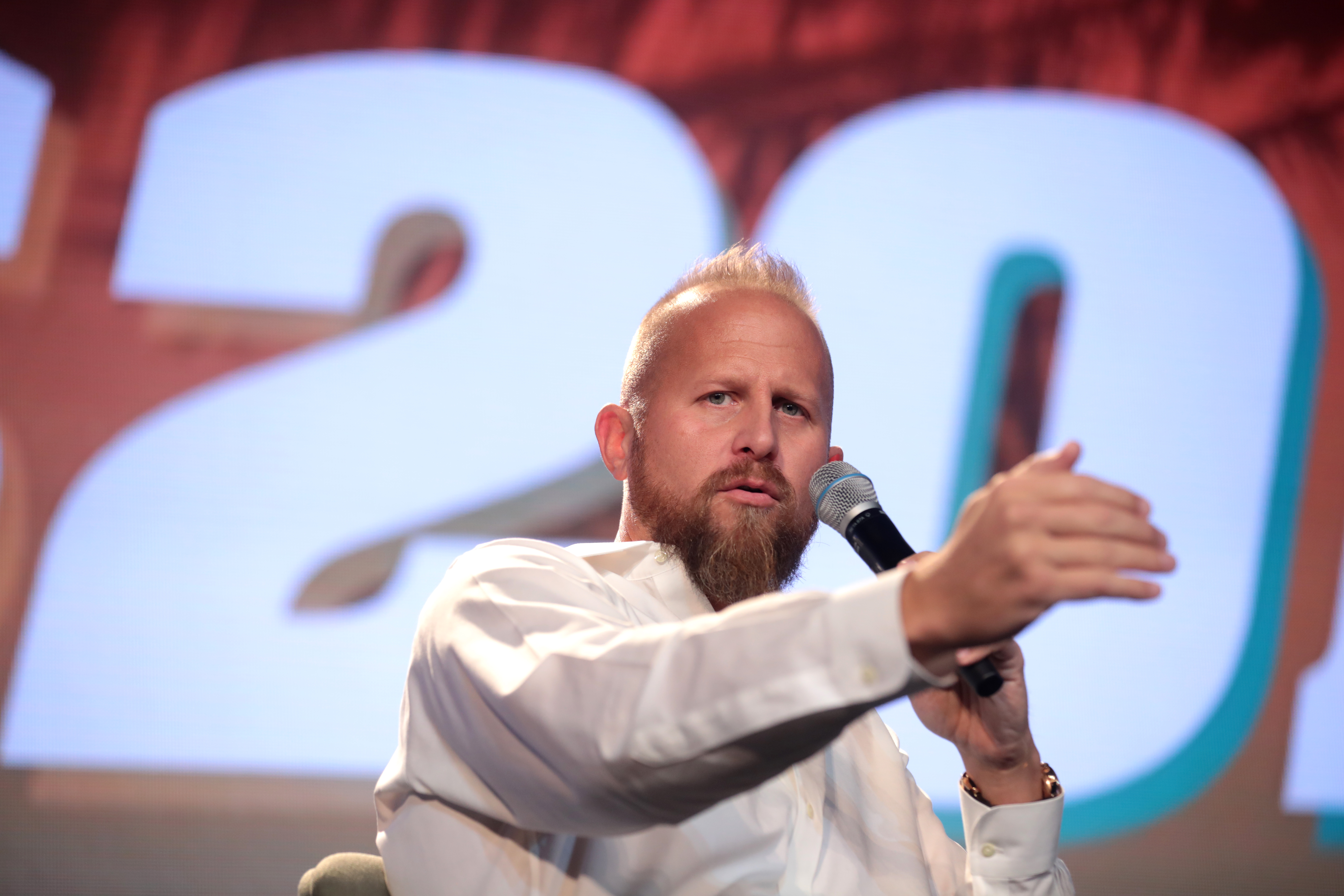
Brad Parscale was chosen as Trump's 2020 campaign manager in February 2018.

On February 25, the Drudge Report announced that the president had chosen Brad Parscale as the campaign manager for his re-election campaign. Parscale was the digital strategist for the previous campaign as the head of Giles-Parscale, which raised some concerns about how the campaign would conduct its advertising.

=== March 2018 ===
On March 10, Trump held a rally in Moon Township, Pennsylvania. He campaigned for Rick Saccone for the local special election and also declared that his 2020 campaign slogan would be "Keep America Great!"

On March 13, Trump made his first trip to the state of California as president to attend a campaign fundraiser at the Beverly Hills home of Tampa Bay Buccaneers owner Ed Glazer. The same day, it was announced that Katrina Pierson and John McEntee had been hired by the campaign as senior advisors.

=== April 2018 ===
In 2018, Trump skipped the White House Correspondents' Dinner, holding a rally on the same night (as he had the previous year), this time in Washington, Michigan.

=== May 2018 ===
In May, Trump held a rally in Indiana where he once again shared that his 2020 campaign slogan would be "Keep America Great!". Although he had already revealed this before, Trump told the supporters at his rally,

"Keep America Great!" Because we are doing so well that in another two years when we start the heavy campaign, "Make America Great Again" wouldn't work out too well. It's going to be "Keep America Great" because that's exactly where we are headed.

=== June 2018 ===
On June 20, Trump held a rally in Duluth, Minnesota, supporting Republican Congressional candidate Pete Stauber in the 2018 midterm elections and addressing his own 2020 prospects in the state among other subjects. The rally came on the day the president had signed an executive order on the treatment of immigrant families with children. At the rally he said enforcement at the border would be "just as tough" under the executive order.

Trump traveled to the Nevada Republican Convention in Las Vegas on Saturday, June 23, and also appeared on the trip at a fundraiser for U.S. senator Dean Heller. Along with policy issues Trump addressed Heller's challenger, U.S. representative Jacky Rosen, as "Wacky Jacky". The president continued, asking of the simultaneous Nevada Democratic Party convention in Reno featuring Senator Elizabeth Warren of Massachusetts, "Wacky Jacky is campaigning with Pocahontas, can you believe it?"

On June 27, the president held a rally in Fargo, North Dakota, supporting Representative Kevin Cramer in his challenge to sitting senator Heidi Heitkamp. Trump also addressed, at the rally, the just-announced news of the retirement from the Supreme Court of Justice Anthony Kennedy. Cramer addressed the issue of abortion and Heitkamp's position on the Pain-Capable Unborn Child Protection Act as his reason for entering the race. "'On behalf of the most forgotten people,' Mr. Cramer said to the president as both men took the stage to deafen applause, 'the unborn babies, thank you for standing for life.'"

=== October 2018 ===
During a campaign rally in Houston on October 22, Trump defined himself as a nationalist, acknowledging the controversial use of the word.

=== November 2018 ===
The campaign financed a number of rallies in support of Republican candidates in the Midterm election. While the Republicans grew their Senate majority in the elections, they lost a significant amount of their House delegation, including control of the chamber.

On November 7, Trump confirmed that Mike Pence would be his vice-presidential running mate in 2020.

=== December 2018 ===
The campaign makes the unusual early move to merge the campaign's field operations with that of the Republican National Committee. The campaign tapped White House political director Bill Stepien and Director of Public Liaison Justin Clark as senior political advisors, who would focus on delegate organization and to ensure that the 2020 Republican National Convention would run smoothly.

== 2019 campaign developments ==
=== January–March 2019 ===
In January, in a unanimous vote, the Republican National Committee informally endorsed the president's campaign and coordination between the two entities formally began.

In February, a state-by-state effort was launched by Trump's campaign team to oppose any presidential challenges from within the Republican Party. The campaign has used endorsements, lobbying and state-party rule changes to ensure Trump does not face opposition during the Republican nominating convention, with a senior campaign adviser calling it a "process of ensuring that the national convention is a television commercial for the president for an audience of 300 million and not an internal fight".

==== El Paso rally ====
The first rally of the year took place at the El Paso County Coliseum, in El Paso, Texas, on February 12. It was highlighted by pro-wall talking points and a BBC cameraman filming the event, getting into a scuffle with a supporter that the president disavowed.

==== CPAC ====
From February 28 to March 3, the annual Conservative Political Action Conference, or CPAC took place in National Harbor, Maryland. This year, the usual straw poll was not held, and on the last day, Trump made a two-and-a-half hour-long speech, which was covered live by C-SPAN and Fox News and was prominently featured in media throughout the world.

==== Grand Rapids ====
On March 28, the president held a rally in Grand Rapids, Michigan, during which he reveled in his alleged "exoneration" calling for Democrats to apologize for the Russia investigation and to stop the "ridiculous bullshit".

Trump also attacked Adam Schiff, the chairman of the House Intelligence Committee, as "little pencil-neck ... who has the smallest, thinnest neck I've ever seen", and someone who is "not a long-ball hitter". The president then ticked through those he felt wronged him as the crowd chanted, "Lock them up! Lock them up!"

=== April–June 2019 ===
In April, Trump visited the border at Calexico, California, before attending campaign events in Los Angeles and Las Vegas.

On April 10, Trump has had a video removed from Twitter because it used Hans Zimmer's track Why Do We Fall? from The Dark Knight Rises without requesting copyright from Warner Bros Pictures. Trump may also have referred to the Batman universe in his campaign.

On April 15, 2019, former Republican Massachusetts governor Bill Weld announced that he will challenge Trump for the 2020 Republican nomination for president.

The New York Times reported in June 2019 that after Trump had been briefed on internal polling showing he was trailing Joe Biden in several key states, he instructed aides to deny it and to publicly state that other data showed him doing well. The next day, Trump tweeted, "The Fake (Corrupt) News Media said they leaked into polling done by my campaign ... They reported Fake numbers that they made up and don't even exist," later telling reporters, "we are winning in every single state that we polled." Public polls at the time showed Trump trailing in key states such as Texas, Michigan and Pennsylvania. Days later, the Trump campaign severed ties with some of its internal pollsters. Trump also said that "something weird" is happening at Fox News after their poll also showed him losing to several Democratic candidates.

On June 12, during an interview with ABC News, Trump said that were a foreign country to offer damaging information on a political opponent, his reaction would be: "I think I'd want to hear it ... There's nothing wrong with listening." Trump also said the "FBI director is wrong" about the need to inform the FBI about a foreign government attempting to influence an election. Trump initially claimed his comments were mischaracterized, prompting ABC News to release a transcript. On June 13, Federal Election Commission chairwoman Ellen Weintraub stated: "It is illegal for any person to solicit, accept, or receive anything of value from a foreign national in connection with a U.S. election." On June 14, Trump told Fox News: "If I don't hear what it is, you're not going to know what is ... Now, if I thought anything was incorrect or badly stated, I'd report it to the Attorney General, the FBI."

A joint report published in June 2019 by the Center for Public Integrity, NBC News and CNBC detailed that the 2016 and 2020 Trump campaigns have yet to pay bills totaling over $800,000 to ten city governments for costs incurred to ensure public safety concerning Trump campaign rallies. The rallies took place from January 2016 to August 2016, and from September 2018 to February 2019.

On June 18, Trump officially launched his re-election campaign at a rally at the Amway Center in Orlando, Florida.

On June 21, writer E. Jean Carroll alleged via New York magazine that Trump raped her in a department store dressing room in 1995 or 1996. Two friends of Carroll confirmed to New York that Carroll had previously confided in them regarding the incident. Trump denied ever meeting Carroll, although New York had published a photo of Trump and Carroll together in 1987.

On June 24, Trump and the GOP launched WinRed, a centralized small-dollar fundraising platform designed to compete with Democrats' ActBlue.

=== July 2019 ===
At a campaign rally on July 17 in North Carolina, Trump criticized four Democratic congresswomen (Alexandria Ocasio-Cortez, Ayanna Pressley, Ilhan Omar, and Rashida Tlaib), stating: "They never have anything good to say. That's why I say, 'Hey if you don't like it, let 'em leave' ... if they don't love it, tell them to leave it." Trump said this in spite of his own history of criticizing previous United States administrations and policies, including his 2016 campaign slogan "Make America Great Again" indirectly asserting America was no longer "great", and his first presidential speech decrying "American carnage". In his speech, Trump referenced Tlaib: "that's not somebody that loves our country." Trump also named Omar and continued that Omar "looks down with contempt" on Americans, the crowd of Trump supporters reacted by chanting 'send her back!' After the rally, Trump tweeted: "What a crowd, and what great people." Asked about the chants on July 18, Trump said he disagreed with the chants, and claimed he had tried to stop them by "speaking very quickly".

=== August 2019 ===
At an August 1 campaign rally in Cincinnati, Ohio, Trump declared: "We will be ending the AIDS epidemic shortly in America, and curing childhood cancer very shortly." This echoed his earlier comments during the June 2019 Orlando, Florida rally, when Trump pledged: "we will come up with the cures to many, many problems, to many, many diseases – including cancer." Despite attacking four Democratic congresswomen as being too critical of America, Trump continued a recent trend of criticizing major American cities; at the rally, Trump singled out the cities of San Francisco, Los Angeles and Chicago. Trump said that Democrats governing liberal cities "deliver poverty for their constituents and privilege for themselves", with federal funding becoming "stolen money and it's wasted money". He also blamed protesters interrupting his rally on the premise that Cincinnati "must have a Democrat mayor". Trump highlighted Baltimore having a higher homicide rate (55.8 of 100,000 people) than the country Afghanistan, although he did not propose a policy to address the issue.

On August 7, following the 2019 Dayton shooting and the 2019 El Paso shooting, Trump visited Dayton, Ohio, and El Paso, Texas. That day, Trump fired back at Democratic presidential candidates Beto O'Rourke ("be quiet") and Joe Biden ("boring") who had previously criticized him. Trump additionally labeled Democratic presidential candidate Julian Castro as a "fool" and "not much" of a man. While talking to medical staff at El Paso, Trump mentioned that his February 2019 campaign rally in the city had drawn a much bigger crowd than O'Rourke's campaign rally that same day. A campaign-style video of Trump shaking hands and posing for photos during the visit was released by the White House.

=== September 2019 ===
On September 11, Trump tweeted that he has not "even started campaigning yet". As the Trump–Ukraine scandal emerged and Trump faced an impeachment inquiry, the Trump campaign launched a $10 million television and web campaign with a video claiming Joe Biden had offered Ukraine $1 billion if they fired a prosecutor who was "investigating his son's company", including video of Biden boasting that the prosecutor had been fired. Hunter Biden served on the board of directors of Burisma Holdings, the owner of which was investigated, but Biden himself was not investigated. Then-vice president Biden had in March 2016 threatened to withhold $1 billion in loan guarantees if Ukraine did not fire the prosecutor, Viktor Shokin. The Obama administration and other governments and non-governmental organizations were concerned that Shokin was not adequately pursuing corruption in Ukraine, was protecting the political elite, and was regarded as "an obstacle to anti-corruption efforts". In particular, he was seen to be slow walking the Burisma investigation. The ad asserted that Trump had acted to fight corruption and Democrats were impeaching him for it. No evidence has surfaced of any malfeasance by the Bidens.

Previously, in sworn testimony, the administration officials said Giuliani directly conveyed the president's demands to them that Ukraine launch investigations into the son of former vice president Joe Biden and a long-debunked 2016 election-related conspiracy. However, Trump later denied sending Rudy Giuliani to Ukraine to push Biden.

=== October–December 2019 ===
As the impeachment investigation continued, the campaign spent copious amounts of money defending the president against it.

Prior to December 12, three lawsuits claimed Trump's business dealings have been violating the Constitution. All these cases advanced to critical stages in federal courts. On the night of December 18, coinciding with the vote to impeach him, Trump held a rally in Battle Creek, Michigan. He received criticism for suggesting the deceased representative John Dingell may have gone to hell.

The Associated Press acquired a recording of senior Trump campaign advisor Justin Clark telling Wisconsin Republicans that "traditionally it's always been Republicans suppressing votes in places" and 2020 would be the time to "start playing offense a little bit" to protect their voters. Clark asserted to the AP that he was speaking about how "Republicans historically have been falsely accused of voter suppression."

In October, the Trump campaign ran a Facebook ad that falsely claimed Joe Biden offered to bribe Ukrainian officials to not investigate his son, Hunter Biden.

== 2020 campaign developments ==
=== January 2020 ===
The impeachment trial began on January 16.

- January 9: First campaign rally of 2020 was held at the 8,000 seat Huntington Center in Toledo, Ohio.
- January 14: Monster Rally in Green Bay, WI
- January 28: Monster Rally in Wildwood, NJ
- January 30: Monster Rally at Drake University's Knapp Center in Des Moines, IA
- January 31: The Kansas state convention began, being the second official event of the Republican race..

=== February 2020 ===
- February 1: At the Kansas state convention, the entire selection process took place, culminating with the official binding of the delegation to Trump, giving him his second state.
- February 2: The Iowa caucuses: the president received 31,464 (97.1%) of the vote.
- February 10: Monster Rally at the SNHU Arena in Manchester, NH
- February 13: In the New Hampshire primary, the president received 129,461 (85.7%) of the votes cast.
- February 22: The Nevada state committee awarded all of its delegates to President Trump.

=== March 2020 ===
- March 3: Super Tuesday. With over 60% of delegates selected by this date, the race for the nomination formally ended.
- March 5: Facebook removed Trump campaign ads directing users to participate in an "Official 2020 Congressional District Census" on what was actually a campaign fundraising site.

=== April 2020 ===
- April 23: The Trump campaign released a new app which offers rewards for sharing Trump's tweets.
- Late April: Trump scolded campaign manager Brad Parscale after data from two polls, one from the Trump's own campaign and one from the Republican National Committee, showed Trump losing to Joe Biden in swing states, reported The Washington Post and CNN. At one point, Trump said he may sue Parscale, although it is unclear whether he was joking. Both Trump and Parscale denied that Trump had shouted. Parscale did not deny a conflict, and he did not deny Trump saying he may sue. Trump told the media he does not "believe the polls".

=== May 2020 ===
- May 4: CNN sent a cease-and-desist letter to the Trump campaign regarding its ad, "American Comeback", which had begun running the previous evening on cable television. The ad selected words from a CNN interview and inserted them into a different context, making it a clear example of "deceptive editing", The Washington Post explained.

=== June 2020 ===
- June 8: After a CNN poll found Trump 14 percentage points behind Joe Biden, Trump on Twitter declared the poll "FAKE", saying he had "retained highly respected pollster, McLaughlin & Associates", to analyze that poll. The Republican Party's congressional campaign arm has advised Republicans to avoid employing McLaughlin & Associates after it predicted in 2014 that Republican Representative Eric Cantor would win re-election in a Republican primary by 34 points, but Cantor actually lost by around 10 points. Later in 2018, McLaughlin & Associates predicted that Republican Representative Rob Woodall would win re-election by 27 points, but Woodall ended up winning by only 0.2 points.
- June 9: The Trump campaign sent a cease-and-desist letter to CNN over their poll, demanding a retraction and apology. CNN refused. During June, Trump also suggested he might sue campaign manager Brad Parscale for presenting polling data showing the president trailing in several key states. The New York Times describes this incident as a jest, rather than a serious threat, and participants in the call say Parscale responded to the threat by saying, "I love you, too."
- June 10: Amid the COVID-19 pandemic in the United States, the Trump campaign said the president would resume his campaign rallies, the first being at Tulsa, Oklahoma, on June 19. Ticketholders must "assume all risks related to exposure to COVID-19", and cannot hold the Trump campaign liable for resultant illness or injury. The rally was later pushed back by one day to June 20, out of respect for the original date falling on Juneteenth (which was deemed insensitive due to the Tulsa race massacre and the ongoing George Floyd protests).
- June 12: The RNC decided not to write a new platform for 2020, reusing 2016's, which denounces the "current president".
- June 15: In a tweet, then-campaign manager Brad Parscale indicated that ticket requests for the June 20 rally in Tulsa, Oklahoma, had surpassed a million.
The inverted red triangle used in Facebook ads is used in Europe, but Antifa in the USA use other symbols

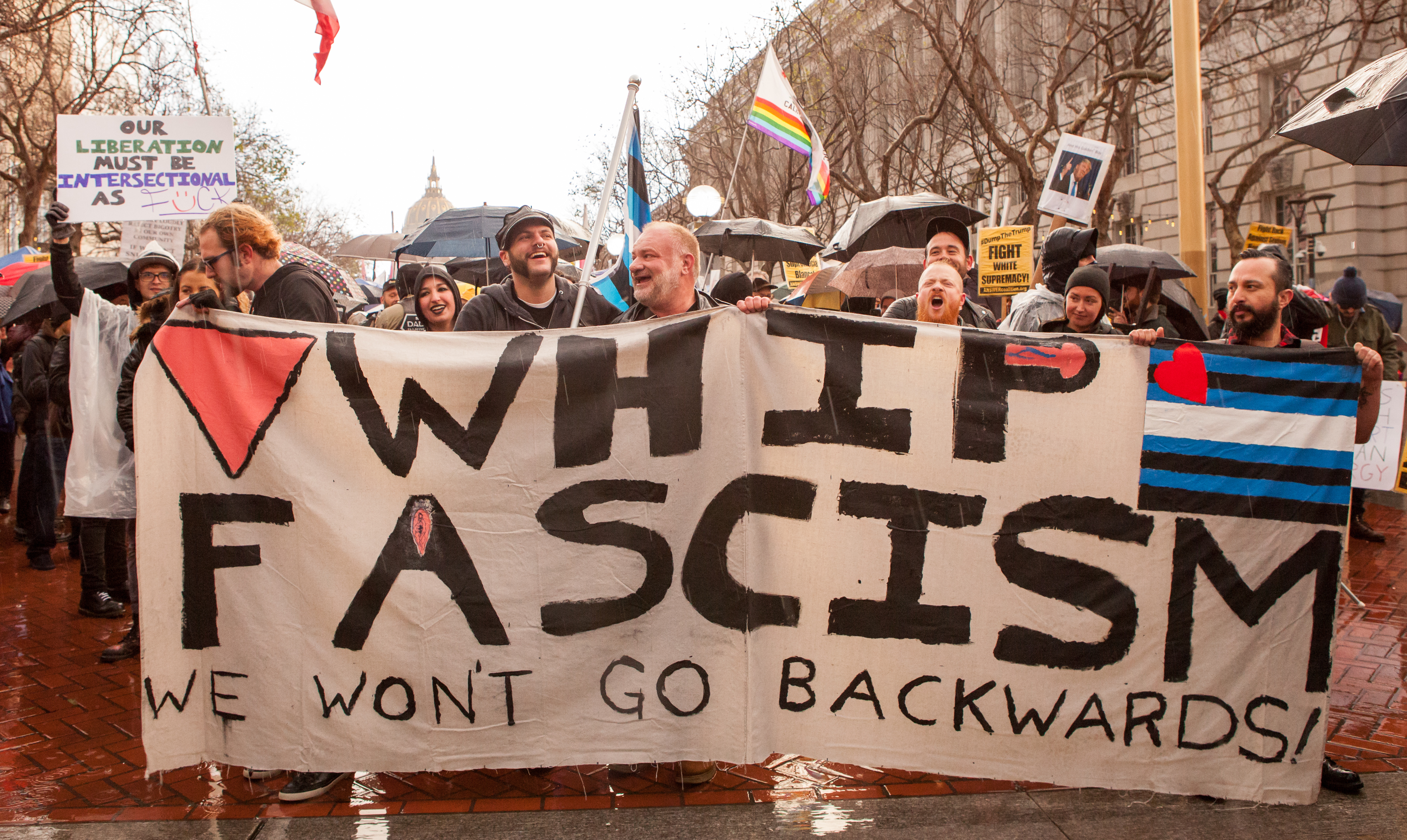
Pink triangle on a protest banner calling Trump a fascist, in San Francisco in 2017

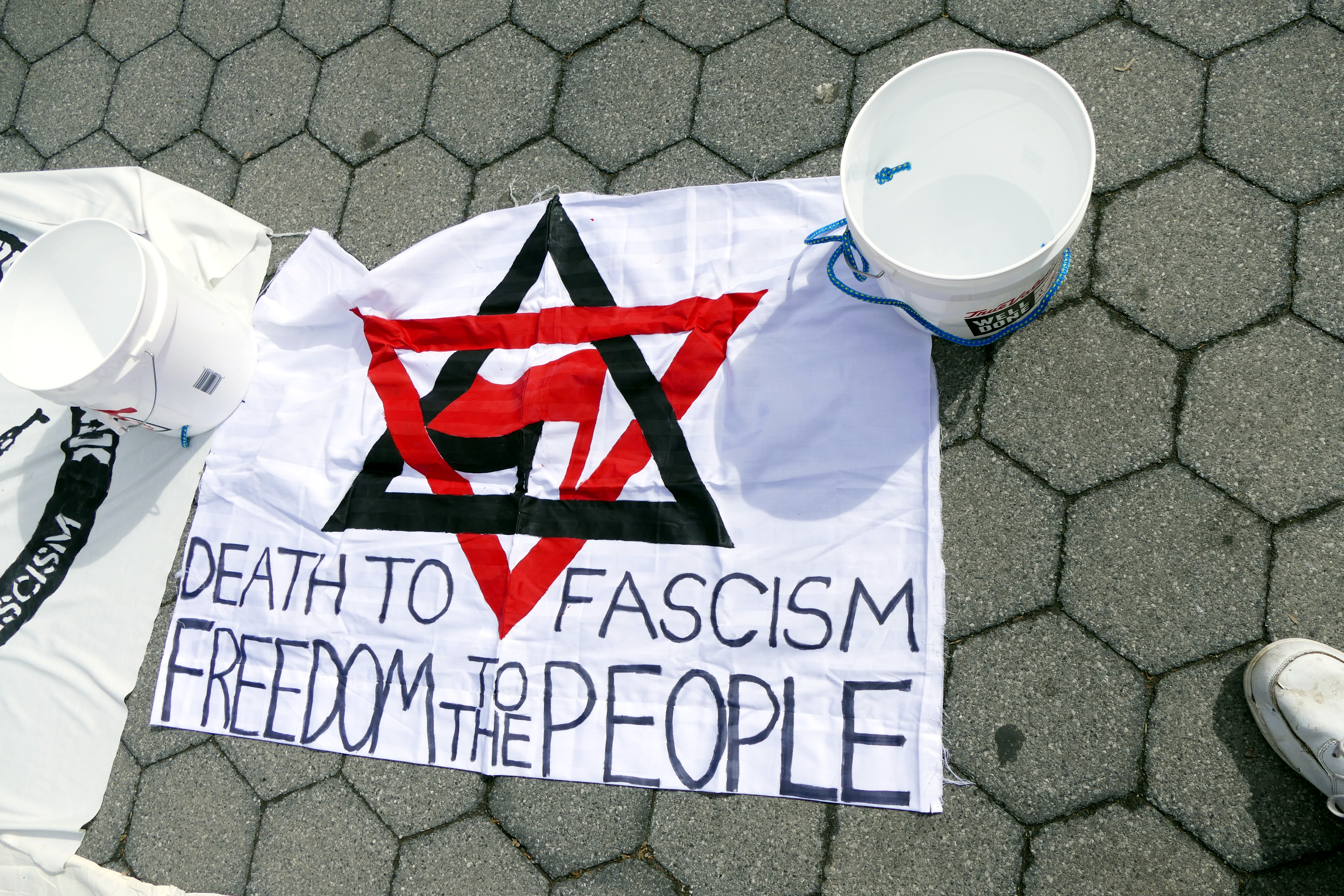
Left: Logo used by Antifa in the USA. Right: A rarely-used variant of the symbol, in New York in March 2019. (Note: At a rally against the Christchurch mosque massacre and other fascist violence. March Against Racism and Fascism in New York City on 16 March 2019. Similar symbols have been used elsewhere, such as by Jewish Anti Fascist Action in the UK.)
- June 18, Trump campaign ads threatening to list Antifa as a designated terrorist group used an inverted red triangle symbol. The campaign claimed it was an Antifa symbol, but until 2023 the red triangle was not widely used by anti-fascists in the United States (further details below).
- June 20: Trump held his first campaign rally in months at the BOK Center in Tulsa. The seating capacity of the arena is 19,199, and in the days leading up to the event, Parscale said more than 800,000 people had registered for the rally. Attendance at the rally was estimated to be just under 6,200, according to the Tulsa Fire Department. The numbers projected by the campaign were inaccurate partially due to TikTok users and K-pop fans registering for the rally and not attending. Trump spent 14 minutes (around 1/8th of the length of his speech) talking about walking hesitatingly down a ramp at the United States Military Academy, and the media coverage regarding the slowness of his descent.
- June 23: President Trump holds rallies in Phoenix and Yuma, Arizona.

==== Antifa terrorism accusations ====
The red triangle in Europe

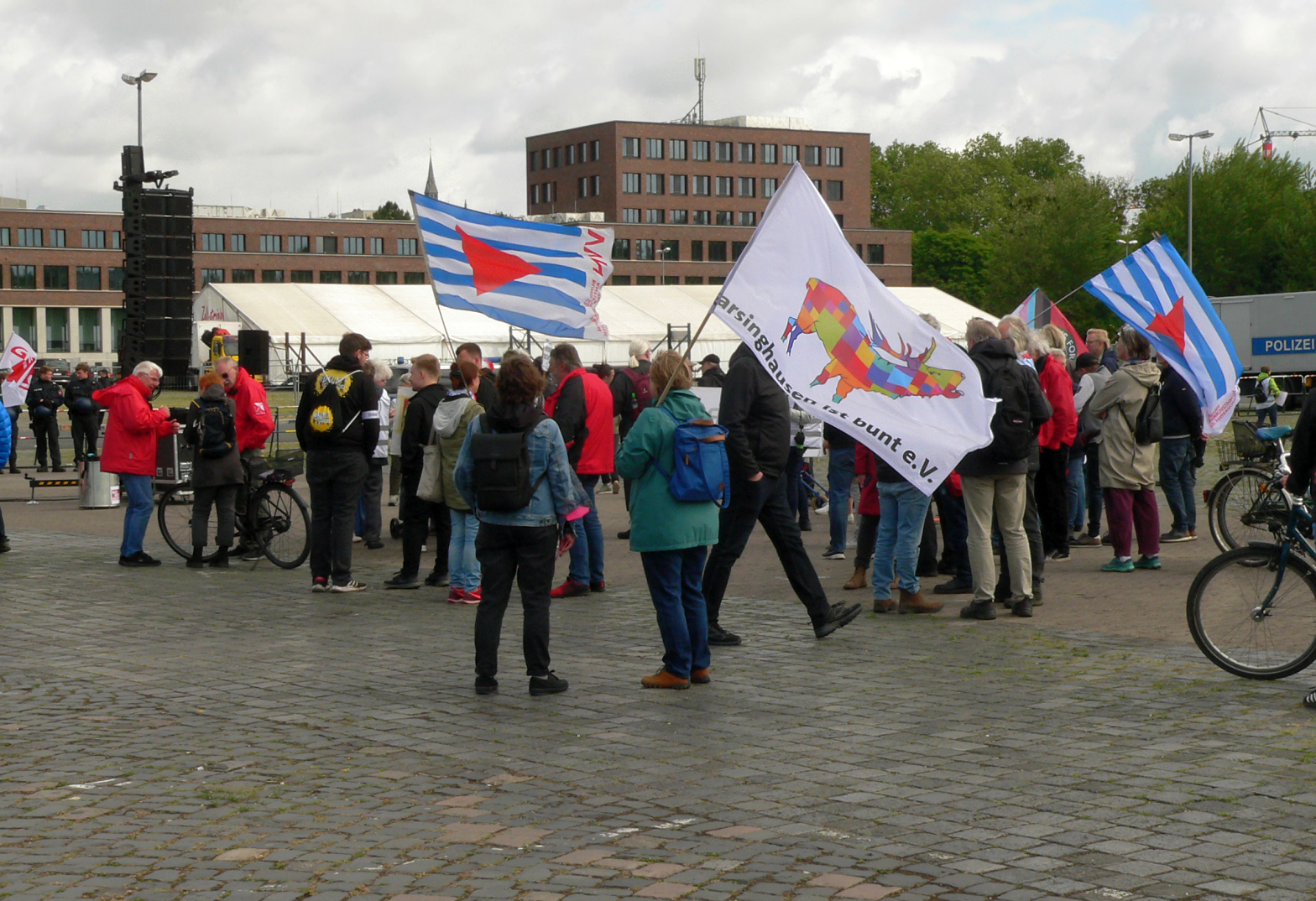
VVN-BdA protest against the Alternative for Germany (AfD) in 2022. (Note: Association of Persecutees of the Nazi Regime – Federation of Antifascists (VVN-BdA) in Hannover, Lower Saxony in 2022.)

VVN-BdA logo (Note: Association of Persecutees of the Nazi Regime – Federation of Antifascists)

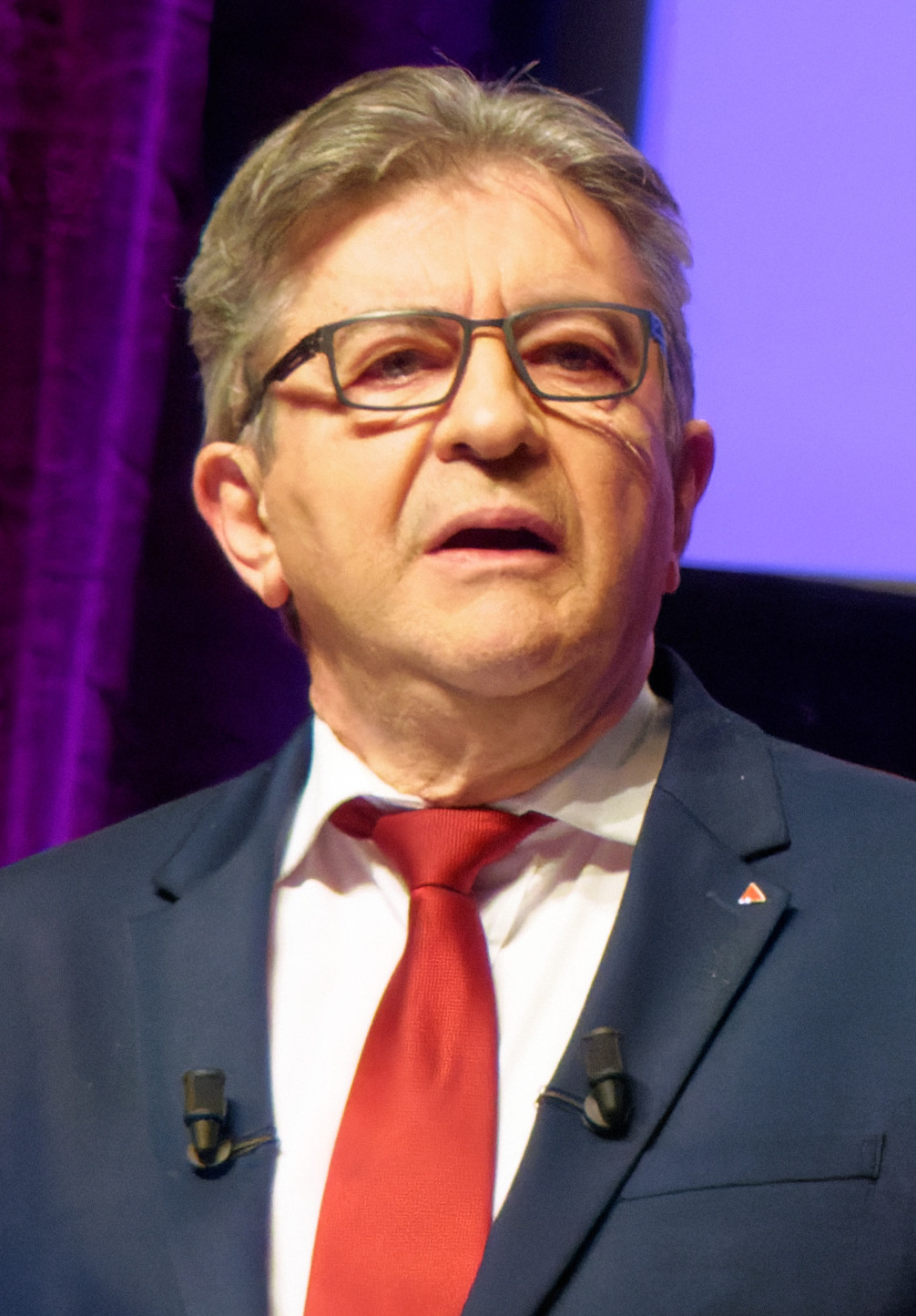
Jean-Luc Mélenchon wearing a red triangle pin in 2022

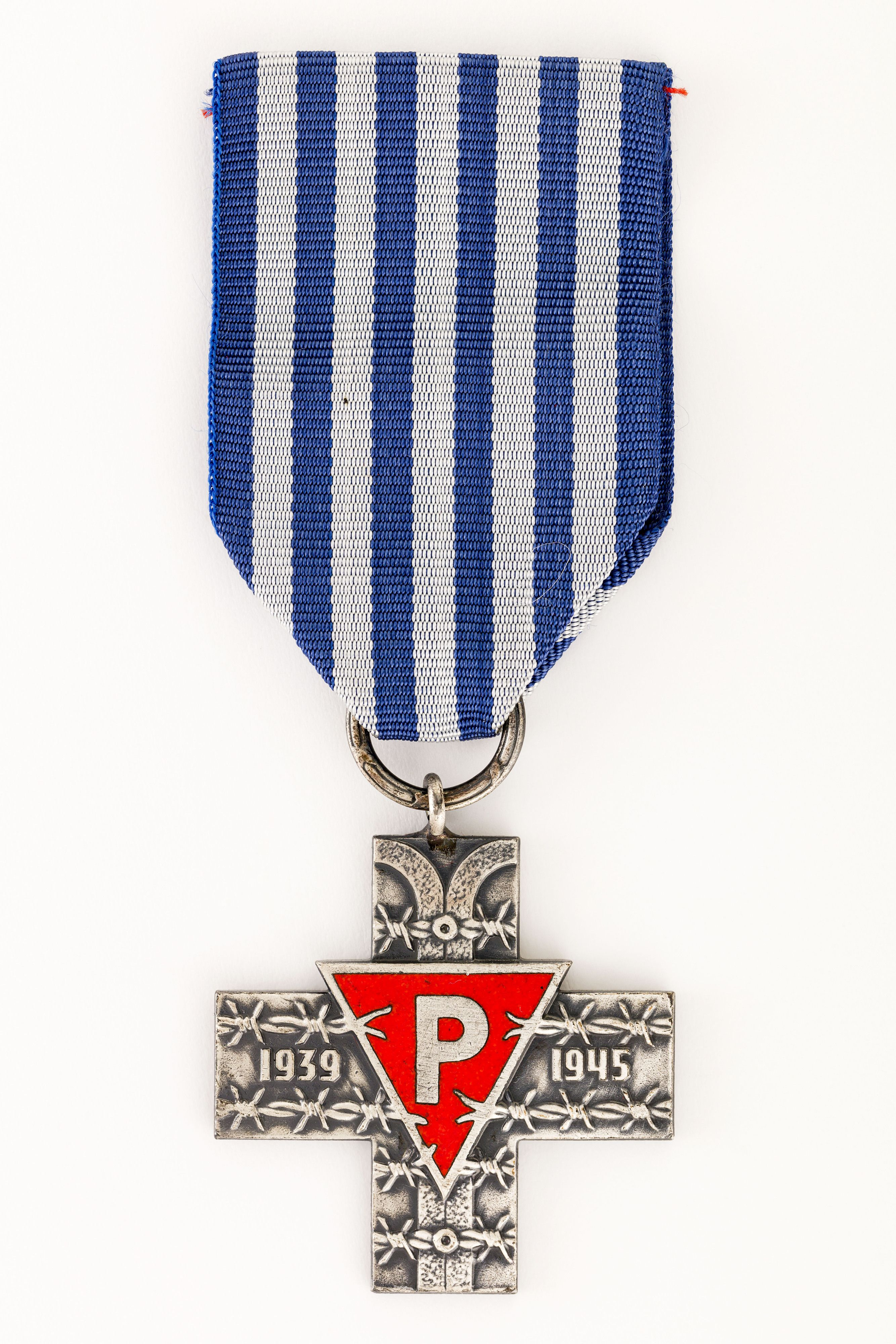
Auschwitz Cross (Polish medal)

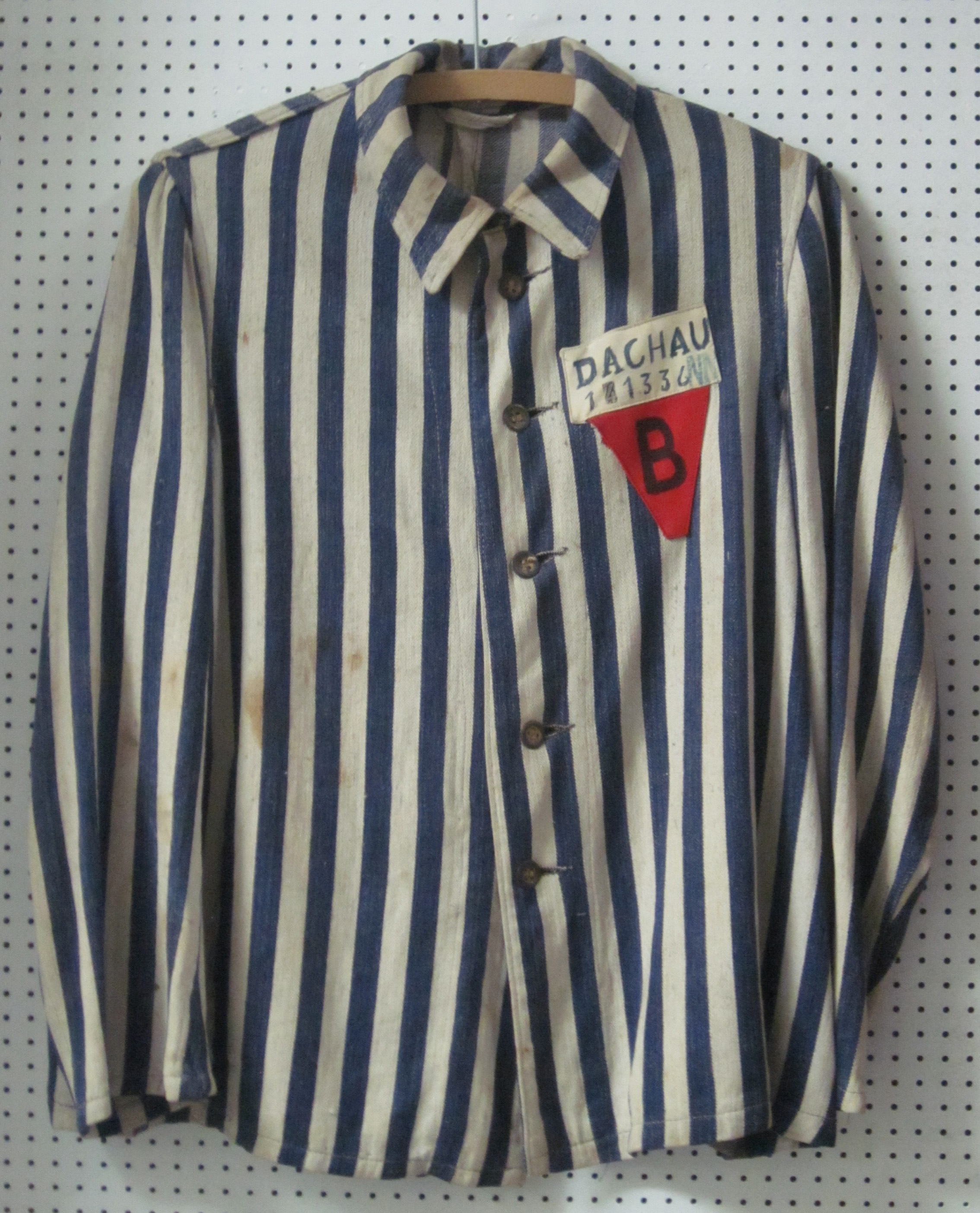
Dachau uniform at the National Museum of the Resistance

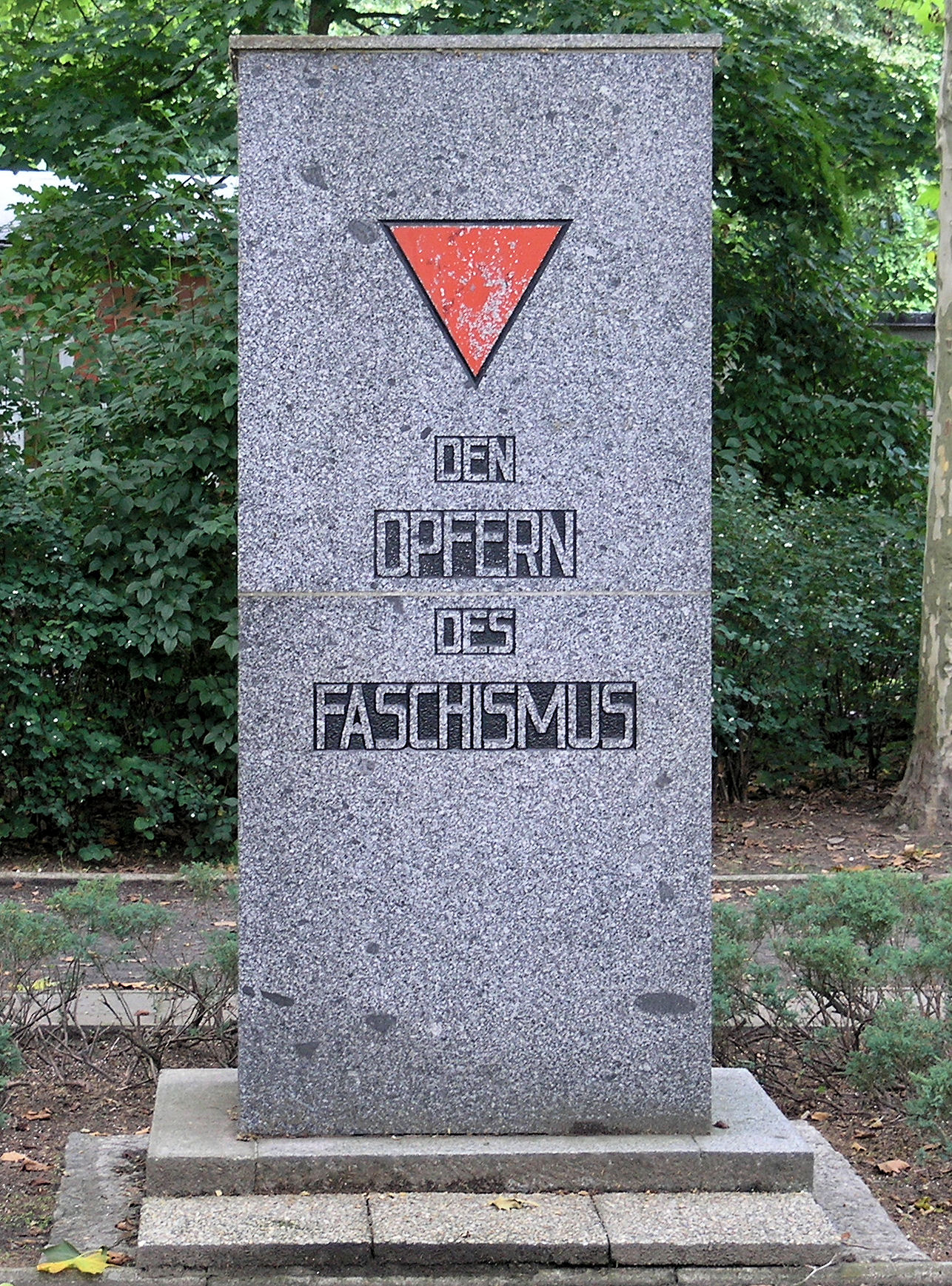
Memorial to the victims of fascism in Berlin (Note: German: "Den Opfern des Faschismus")

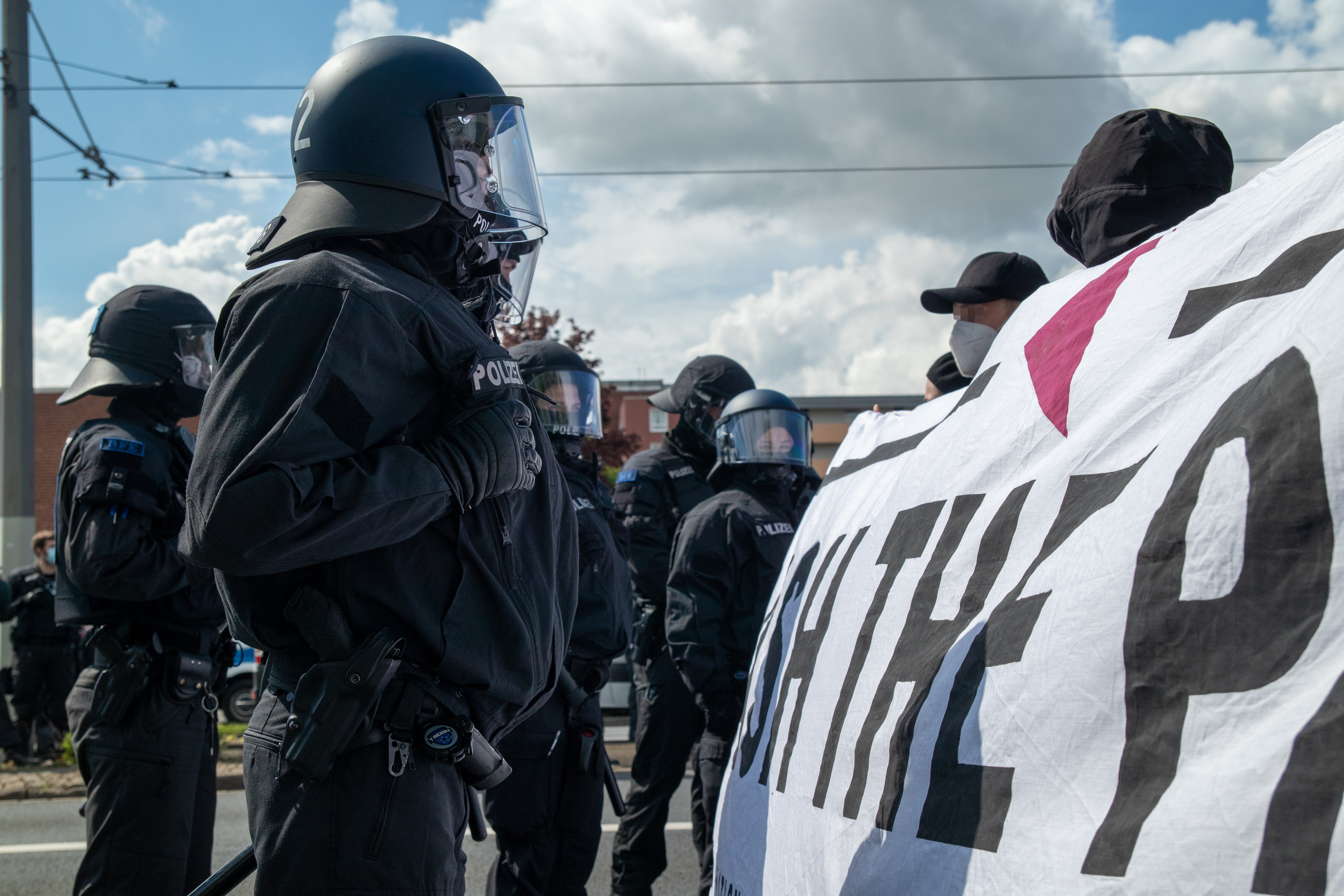
Protest against Alternative for Germany (AfD), in Braunschweig, Lower Saxony in 2021

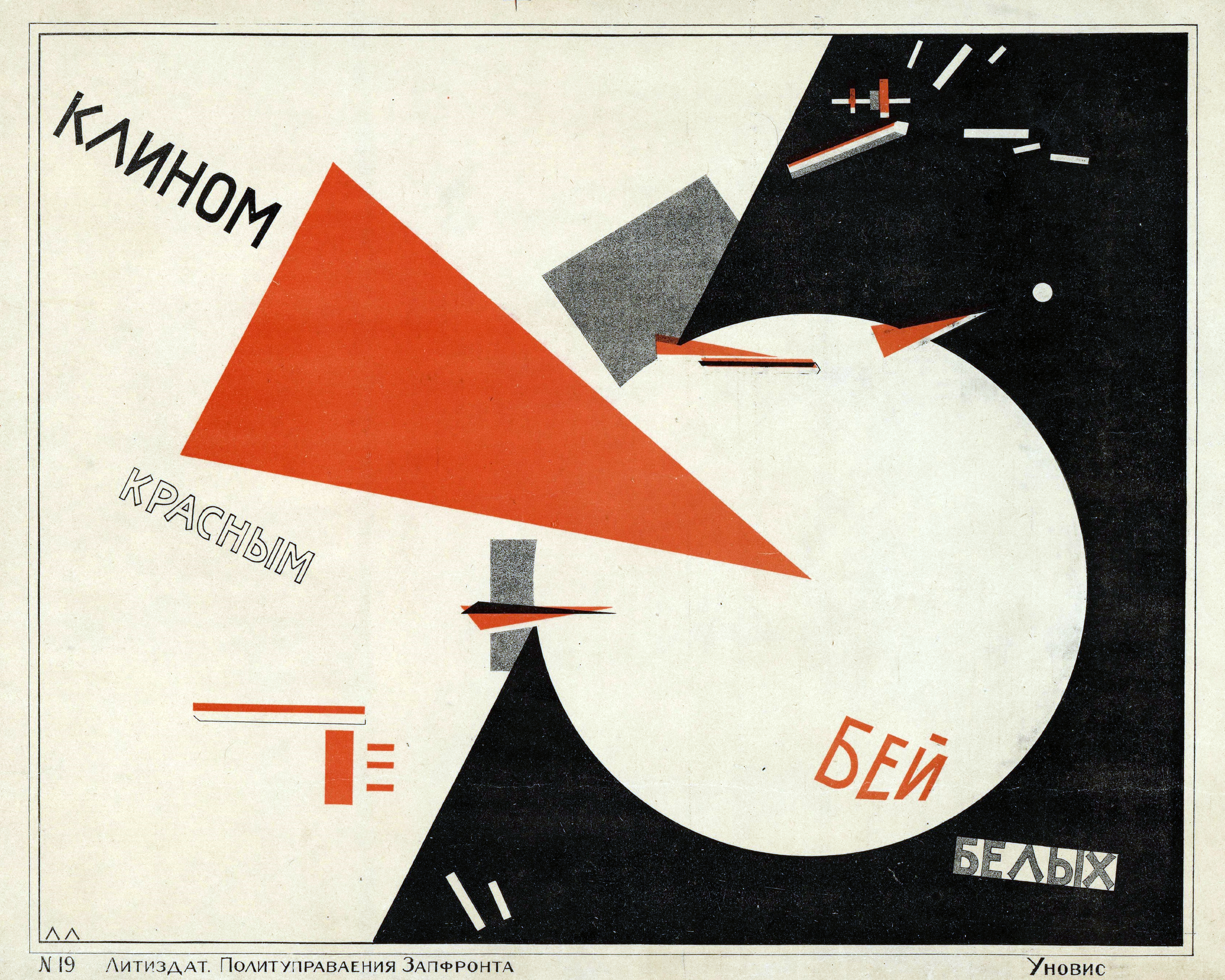
El Lissitzky's 1919 anti-White movement poster (Note: Beat the Whites with the Red Wedge (Russian: Клином красным бей белых).)

In June 2020, Donald Trump's election campaign included an advertisement on social media saying that he would make "Antifa" (short for anti-fascism) a "designated terrorist" group. The advertisement showed an inverted red triangle as an antifa symbol.

Media at the time described it only as a "Nazi symbol". Most disregarded is reclamation in Europe after the war, first to memorialise Victims of Nazi Germany. It was then more broadly adopted by anti-fascist groups and other leftists in Europe. Some of these uses referenced an older red wedge from a 1918 anti-White movement poster from the Russian revolution.

The campaign posted an advertisement on Facebook stating that "Dangerous MOBS of far-left groups are running through our streets and causing absolute mayhem" and identifying them as "ANTIFA", accompanied by a graphic of a downward-pointing red triangle. The ads appeared on the Facebook pages of Donald Trump, the Trump campaign, and Vice President Mike Pence. Many observers compared the graphic to the symbol used by the Nazis for identifying political prisoners such as communists, social democrats and socialists. Many noted the number of ads – 88 – which is associated with neo-Nazis and white supremacists.

Progressive and conservative Jewish groups both expressed public disapproval for Trump's use of the symbol. "Bend the Arc: Jewish Action", a Progressive Jewish site, stated the campaign was using the symbol "to smear millions of protestors".

Facebook removed the campaign ads with the graphic, saying that its use in this context violated their policy against "organized hate". The Trump campaign's communications director wrote, "The red triangle is a common Antifa symbol used in an ad about Antifa." Historian Mark Bray, author of Antifa: The Anti-Fascist Handbook, disputed this, saying that the symbol is not associated with Antifa in the United States.

In 2025 Trump used terrorism legislation against alleged drug smugglers from Latin America. In September 2025 this escalated airstrikes at sea, against civilians, who were labelled as terrorists for alleged drug smuggling. The first airstrike sank a boat and reportedly killed 11 people. The legality of the airstrike is unclear.

=== July 2020 ===
Celebrating Independence Day with an address at Mount Rushmore, Trump said he was in a battle against a "new far-left fascism". The New York Times characterized Trump as using the address "to mount a full-on culture war against a straw-man version of the left that he portrayed as inciting mayhem and moving the country toward totalitarianism". The Washington Post reported that while "amplifying racism and stoking culture wars have been mainstays of Trump's public identity for decades, they have been particularly pronounced this summer as the president has reacted to the national reckoning over systemic discrimination by seeking to weaponize the anger and resentment of some white Americans for his own political gain."

On the evening of July 4, musician and entrepreneur Kanye West announced his campaign for the presidency. Los Angeles Times reported that "It's unclear whether West has filed any of the necessary paperwork to formally join the race between incumbent Donald Trump – for whom West has expressed admiration," and said this "might be part of an effort to draw Black supporters away from Biden to help Trump."

Vice President Pence and White House Press Secretary Kayleigh McEnany claimed that Joe Biden had asserted police had "become the enemy". Biden's words were taken out of context, as he had actually said the use of military-grade heavy equipment by police officers can look like "the military invading" communities and thus makes police "become the enemy" in the perception of some in the community. According to Media Matters, Trump surrogate Sean Hannity also misrepresented Biden's words to his radio and television audiences at least 17 times in July.

On July 10, the Trump campaign postponed a rally planned for the next day in Portsmouth, New Hampshire, with Tim Murtaugh, the campaign's communications director citing "safety reasons because of Tropical Storm Fay". On July 15, Trump announced that he had promoted former deputy campaign manager Bill Stepien to campaign manager, replacing Brad Parscale.

On July 19, in an interview aired on Fox News, Trump called the network's poll showing Biden leading by 8% "fake", further saying he would "have to see" if he would accept a loss in the election, citing postal voting as a way it would be rigged against him. According to CNN, "There is no credible evidence that mail-in voting is rife with corruption," and "the concerted push by Trump to delegitimize mail-in ballots is raising alarm bells among Republican operatives, who are worried the President's demand for in-person voting will mainly serve to dampen turnout among his own supporters." (Note: On August 3, 2020, Trump said he had the right to issue an executive order concerning mail-in voting. He elaborated, "We haven't got there yet, but we'll see what happens." On August 4, he tweeted: Whether you call it Vote by Mail or Absentee Voting, in Florida the election system is Safe and Secure, Tried and True. Florida's Voting system has been cleaned up ... so in Florida I encourage all to request a Ballot & Vote by Mail!)

During the first half of July, the campaign ran a television ad more than a thousand times targeted at women in Ohio, falsely asserting that Joe Biden proposes to "defund the police", which would increase home invasions and rapes, concluding that "You won't be safe in Joe Biden's America." Trump won Ohio by eight points in 2016 but polls showed he was in a statistical tie with Biden in July. Across numerous other states, Trump ran another ad falsely accusing Biden of proposing to defund the police, with a simulated 9-1-1 call response:

You have reached the 9-1-1 police emergency line. Due to the defunding of the police department, we're sorry but no one is here to take your call. If you are calling to report a rape, please press one. To report a murder, press two. To report a home invasion, press three. For all other crimes, leave your name and number and someone will get back to you. Our estimated wait time is currently five days. Goodbye.

In June and July, the campaign spent over $2 million on Facebook ads. One claims (with 308 variations) that "Dangerous MOBS of far-left groups are running through our streets and causing absolute mayhem. They are DESTROYING our cities and rioting." In July, television ads were aired intending to portray the violent turmoil of a future Biden presidency – utilizing images of turmoil occurring during Trump's presidency.

In mid-July, the Ronald Reagan Presidential Foundation & Institute formally asked the Trump campaign and Republican National Committee to stop using Reagan's name and likeness for fundraising. The request came after a campaign email solicitation offered commemorative coins with images of Trump and Reagan.

On July 23, Trump announced the cancellation of the Jacksonville portion of the 2020 Republican National Convention, citing rising COVID-19 numbers. On July 30, he publicly suggested delaying the election due to COVID-19, despite the authority to make such a change lying with Congress. Some of the most prominent leaders of the Republican Party rejected that such a prospect would be considered. Later the same day, Trump walked back his comments, while repeating his condemnation of postal voting. Responding to the comments and the president's handling of the pandemic, Timothy Egan writes in a New York Times opinion piece that Trump "should do humanity a favor and surrender now", saying this could "save many lives of supporters who have listened to the lethal quackery from the presidential podium". According to multiple high-ranking Republicans, Senate Majority Leader Mitch McConnell has signaled to Republican Senate candidates that they may distance themselves from Trump if they feel it will help them salvage their own campaigns.

At the end of July, the Trump campaign temporarily halted television advertising to reassess its messaging strategy. A campaign official attributed the pause to the recent change in campaign leadership, stating, "We'll be back on the air shortly, even more forcefully exposing Joe Biden as a puppet of the radical left-wing." The campaign had $146.6 million budgeted for television and radio ads from Labor Day until November. Television advertising was expected to resume on August 3, with a focus on states that will vote the earliest; a new campaign ad features altered images to falsely portray Biden as "alone" and "hiding" in his basement.

=== August 2020 ===
On August 5, Trump announced that he was considering hosting his GOP convention acceptance speech from the White House, saying "It would be the easiest from the standpoint of security." Fox News reported public criticism of the announcement, including from House Speaker Nancy Pelosi, and cited the Hatch Act of 1939, which prohibits executive-branch federal employees other than the president and vice president from engaging in partisan political activity. (Note: A week later, Trump reiterated that he would "probably be giving [his] speech at the White House".) On August 6, it was reported that the Commission on Presidential Debates had rejected the campaign's request to move or add a debate to early September, before states begin early voting. The first debate is scheduled for September 29.

On August 14, Trump gathered about 300 police officers who support him at his golf club in Bedminster, New Jersey, and asked the crowd whether "Sleepy Joe" or "Slow Joe" was a better nickname for his opponent. The former name, which Trump has frequently used, provoked a louder response. He stated that "Putin and Kim Jong-un and President Xi of China, they're not sleepy. We can't have slow, sleepy people dealing with them." On August 17, Miles Taylor, former chief of staff to former Department of Homeland Security (DHS) secretary Kirstjen Nielsen, published an op-ed in The Washington Post and featured in an ad from Republican Voters Against Trump. In the ad, Taylor says, "What we saw [over] 2 1/2 years in that administration, was terrifying." He says that when the DHS raised national security concerns, Trump "wasn't interested in those things," and attempted to exploit the department "for his own political purposes and to fuel his own agenda," including by withholding federal wildfire aid to California because he lacked support in the state. Taylor asserts that "Years of DHS planning for a pandemic threat have been largely wasted," and concludes: "Given what I experienced ... I have to support Joe Biden for president."

On August 20, Trump said in Old Forge, Pennsylvania, that "Joe Biden is a puppet of the radical left movement that seeks to destroy the American way of life. They don't want energy, they don't want guns, they don't want religion." Later that day, Trump tweeted against Biden, the Obamas and mail-in voting. The campaign also released a digital ad suggesting that Hunter Biden used his father's vice presidency to personally profit from a Chinese bank (which Hunter denied in 2019). That night, Biden accepted his party's presidential nomination at the 2020 Democratic National Convention.

On August 22, The New York Times reported that Trump would speak on all four nights (only one night being customary) of the 2020 Republican National Convention scheduled for the next week, that nearly half of the keynote speakers would be Trump family members, and that two former producers of The Apprentice would be coordinating the event. On August 23, Trump senior adviser Jason Miller stated that the campaign was "conserving money right now and focusing a little bit more smartly and a little more effectively on the states that are voting early," while Politico reports that "even in most of those early-voting states, Biden has dominated Trump" regarding television ad spending. On the first night of the convention (which had less viewers than both the 2016 convention and the 2020 Democratic event), Donald Trump Jr. said his father's policies had been "like rocket fuel to the economy ... especially to the middle class," while

Biden has promised to take that money back out of your pocket and keep it in the swamp. That makes sense though, considering Joe Biden is basically the Loch Ness Monster of the swamp. For the past half-century, he's been lurking around in there. He sticks his head up every now and then to run for president, and then he disappears and doesn't do much in between.

On the second night of the Republican National Convention, Secretary of State Mike Pompeo spoke from Jerusalem (where he was on state business), prompting an investigation by House Democrats to determine whether this violated the Hatch Act, which Pompeo had instructed federal employees to obey earlier in the year. The use of the convention to perform a naturalization ceremony (Note: The new citizens reportedly did not know their naturalizations would be televised. Acting Homeland Security Secretary Chad Wolf also denied such knowledge.) and reveal the presidential pardon of Jon Ponder also drew scrutiny for using government business to promote Trump's campaign. On the final night of the convention, Trump stated:

Your vote will decide whether we protect law abiding Americans, or whether we give free rein to violent anarchists, agitators and criminals who threaten our citizens. And this election will decide whether we will defend the American way of life, or whether we allow a radical movement to completely dismantle and destroy it.

On August 31, Trump asserted in an interview with Laura Ingraham that Biden is being controlled by "People that you've never heard of, people that are in the dark shadows." When the program host said this sounded like the promotion of a conspiracy theory, Trump elaborated that "They're people that are on the streets, they're people that are controlling the streets." He further claimed that someone "from a certain city" boarded a plane which was "almost completely loaded with thugs [around seven in total] wearing these dark uniforms, black uniforms with gear and this and that," to come to the Republican National Convention "to do big damage." (Note: Clarifying his comments the next day, Trump said, "A person was on a plane, said that there were about 6 people like that person, more or less, and what happened is the entire plane filled up with the looters, the anarchists, the rioters, people that obviously were looking for trouble. And the person felt very uncomfortable on the plane. This would be a person you would know.") Then, prompted by Ingraham to discuss how Biden's campaign was being financed, he said, "The money is coming from some very stupid rich people who have no idea that if their thing ever succeeded, which it won't, they will be thrown to the wolves like you've never seen before."

In late August, the Trump campaign shared a video featuring the soundbite of Joe Biden saying: "You won't be safe in Joe Biden's America." The quote was taken wholly out of context, as Biden was instead attributing this quote to "Trump and Pence", while Biden was stating that images of violence were actually that of "Donald Trump's America today". Meanwhile, White House social media director Dan Scavino shared a fake video purportedly showing Biden sleeping during a live interview. In fact, the fake video combined two different clips: one of Biden looking down with eyes half-closed, and one of an interviewer asking activist Harry Belafonte to "wake up". The fake video also had new audio added, of snoring sounds.

=== September 2020 ===
On September 2, Trump told WECT-TV in Wilmington, North Carolina, that people should vote twice—once in person and again by mail—to see if anyone stops them from committing this illegal act. When CNN asked U.S. Attorney General Bill Barr for his input, Barr claimed he did not know whether it was illegal to vote twice. Barr also told CNN that he believed that China was the biggest active threat to U.S. election security (contradicting U.S. intelligence, which had identified Russia) and that foreign adversaries would likely sow the system with fraudulent mail-in ballots (although he admitted he had no evidence of this).

On September 3, Trump spoke in Pennsylvania. He encouraged voters to vote in person, referencing potential mail fraud or ballots going missing. He also focused on topics of the economy and public safety in light of mass protests and riots. He attacked Biden for mixed messages on fracking and for wearing a mask so much during the COVID-19 pandemic.

The New York Times reported on September 5 that the Trump campaign had spent $58 million of donor money on legal bills, far exceeding the levels of his predecessors at similar points in their campaigns. The spending included routine matters, and legal work involving the Russia investigation and his impeachment, as well as relating to enforcement of nondisclosure agreements with former associates and his personal business interests.

On September 7, The New York Times reported the campaign might be facing a cash crunch, having spent more than $800 million of the $1.1 billion raised from early 2019 through July. The Times reported the campaign had engaged in profligate spending until the new campaign manager Bill Stepien imposed controls. The next day, Trump stated he was prepared to spend his own money if necessary.

From September 8–12, the Trump campaign released a "Support Our Troops" advertisement with a picture of silhouetted Russian Mikoyan MiG-29 fighter jets and soldiers carrying at least one Russian AK-74 assault rifle, that drew international commentary.

On September 10, The Washington Post reported that campaign manager Bill Stepien had already reduced spending on television ads. "Between Aug. 10 and Sept. 7, Biden's campaign spent about $90 million on television ads, more than four times the $18 million spent by the Trump campaign," the reporters said.

On September 13, Trump held a rally in Henderson, Nevada. Due to the pandemic, it was his first indoor rally since the Tulsa rally in June, and it violated Nevada's prohibition against gatherings of more than 50 people.

The Associated Press reported on September 14 that, although the Trump campaign had spent heavily for months, it did not seem to have hurt Biden in the polls, and the Trump campaign no longer could count on having more cash than the Biden campaign. Biden, while achieving record-breaking fundraising in August, outspent Trump by nearly double that same month. Meanwhile, the Trump campaign canceled advertising in several states, while retaining $200 million worth of reserved ads, characterizing the cancellations as strategic.

Trump held a rally on September 18 in Bemidji, Minnesota. Afterward 16 COVID-19 cases were traced to the rally and four more to a protest held just outside.

On September 23, Trump was asked if he would commit to a peaceful transition of power if he lost the 2020 election, to which he replied: "Well, we'll have to see what happens." He also said at a press briefing, "I've been complaining very strongly about the ballots. And the ballots are a disaster. Get rid of the ballots and you'll have a very peaceful — there won't be a transfer, frankly. There will be a continuation." That same day, he said it was important to confirm his incoming Supreme Court nominee promptly because he believed the election outcome would be determined by the Supreme Court and he needed a majority to overcome "this scam that the Democrats are pulling." Also that day, Donald Trump Jr. asserted in social media posts that "The radical left are laying the groundwork to steal this election from my father," adding, "Their plan is to add millions of fraudulent ballots that can cancel your vote and overturn the election," asking "able-bodied" people to join an election security "army" for his father.

On September 23, Eric Trump shared a video on Twitter, showing Joe Biden looking away from the camera during an interview with Telemundo. Eric Trump used this to falsely claim that Biden was using a teleprompter. This was re-shared by Trump campaign senior adviser Jason Miller, and then Trump himself. In actuality, Biden was looking away from the camera because there was a monitor off-screen where Telemundo viewers were shown asking Biden questions. Biden was replying to one such viewer directly.

Meanwhile, the Trump campaign ran video and pictorial advertisements on Facebook, YouTube, and Google, which falsely claimed that Joe Biden used a teleprompter during an April 2020 interview with James Corden. A teleprompter was seen on Biden's screen during that interview, but that was in fact Corden's teleprompter, not Biden's. The teleprompter was shared on the screens of Corden's interviewees via Zoom. The Trump campaign used the advertisement to claim that Biden "can't handle an interview", "can't handle presidency". Another deceptive advertisement ran by the Trump campaign claimed that "Joe Biden completely botches the Pledge of Allegiance", as Biden had paraphrased the Pledge. However, Biden's words were taken out of context, as Biden was not trying to legitimately recite the Pledge; rather, he was referencing specific parts of it while he argued that he would govern as president for all states, instead of only Democratic-controlled states.

Trump's support among seniors weakened significantly going into the final weeks of the campaign. On September 24 he announced he was sending $200 drug discount cards to 33 million Medicare recipients, at a cost approaching $7 billion.

On September 25, Trump unveiled his "Platinum Plan for Black America", promising $500 billion in capital access, as well as "creating 3 million new jobs, and bridging historic disparities in health care and education" and making Juneteenth a national holiday.

On September 29, the candidates participated in a first debate in Cleveland. The event was characterized by Trump frequently interrupting both Biden and moderator Chris Wallace. This prompted the debate commission to announce that microphones would be cut off at the next debate if the rules are broken by either candidate.

On September 30, three cases of COVID-19 were traced to a Trump rally held in Duluth, Minnesota.

==== Musician Eddy Grant's copyright infringement lawsuit ====
In September 2020, musician Eddy Grant sued Trump for unauthorized use of Grant's 1983 chart hit Electric Avenue in an August 2020 presidential campaign video. Trump posted the video on Twitter where it was viewed more than 13 million times before Twitter took it down after Grant's copyright complaint. Grant's song plays during 40 seconds of the animated 55-second video. Trump unsuccessfully attempted to have the suit dismissed, citing fair use and "absolute presidential immunity". Grant asked for $300,000 in damages. Trump's attorney told the court that the deposition contained sensitive information about Trump's presidential campaign strategy. He asked that Trump and campaign advisor Dan Scavino's testimony be permanently sealed because it would give an "unwarranted competitive advantage" to his opponents in the 2024 presidential election, and because it "could be used against them in other, parallel, litigations unrelated to this matter.". The case, Grant v. Trump (1:20-cv-07103), is pending in federal court in the Southern District New York.

=== October 2020 ===
On October 2, two hours after it was announced that White House senior advisor Hope Hicks had tested positive for COVID-19, Trump tweeted that both he and First Lady Melania Trump had tested positive as well and would immediately go into quarantine. As a result, they cancelled all in-person campaign events scheduled in the coming days, including a rally in Orlando-Sanford International Airport. Several other White House members and associates tested positive for the virus, including Trump campaign manager Bill Stepien.

The Trump campaign ran Facebook advertisements featuring fake photos altered to show Joe Biden wearing an earpiece. The advertisements included captions including: "Who is in Joe's ear?", and that Biden "declined an earpiece inspection" at the debate. Asked to comment on the advertisements, the Trump campaign claimed that they were "obvious satire".

On October 7, Vice President Pence participated in a debate with Senator Kamala Harris, the Democratic candidate for vice president on the Biden ticket, that was held by USA Today and moderated by Susan Page, the Washington bureau chief of the newspaper.

Trailing in polls during the month leading to the election, Trump became increasingly insistent that his political adversaries be indicted, including Biden, former president Obama and Hillary Clinton, and that documents be declassified and released, including Clinton's emails.

Six weeks after the Republican convention, the Trump campaign canceled all television and radio advertising in Ohio, Iowa and New Hampshire, and substantially reduced advertising in four other states.

On October 15, Biden and Trump hosted separate town hall speeches, in lieu of a second debate.

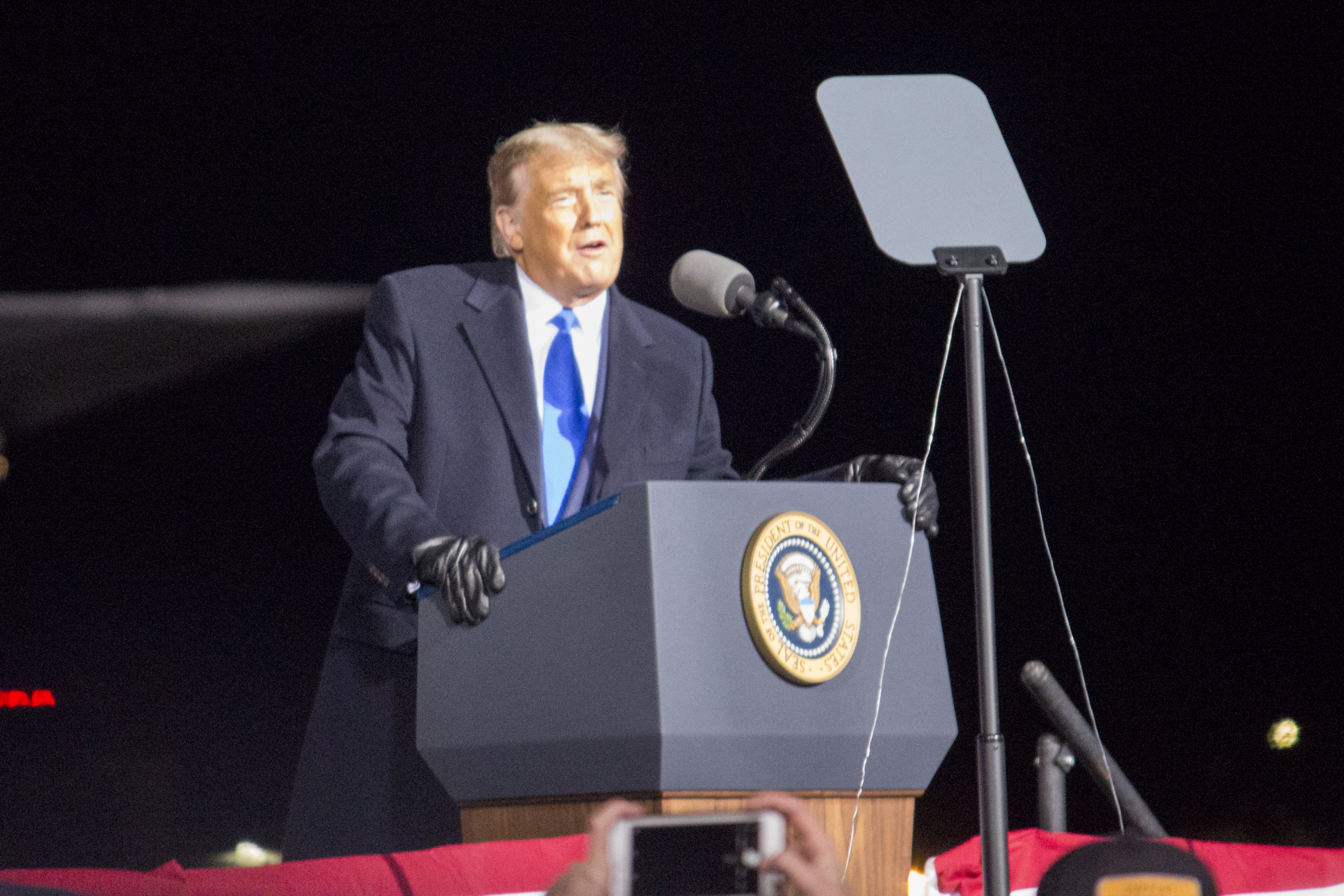
Trump at a rally in Omaha, Nebraska, on October 27

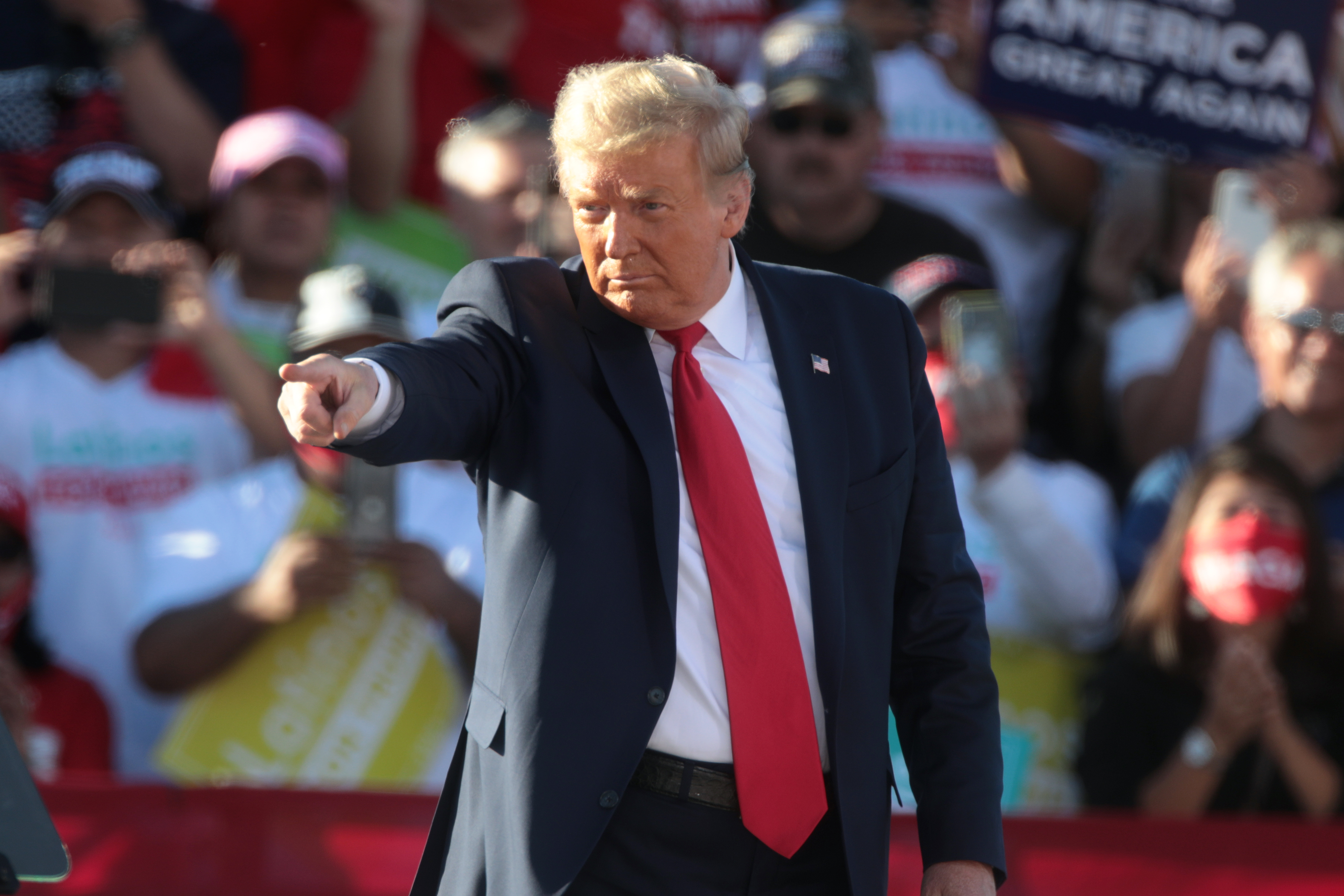
Trump at October 28 rally at Phoenix airport, Arizona

On October 22, the candidates participated in a second and final debate in Nashville. In contrast to the first debate, the microphones of both candidates were muted at select times. Trump pressed Biden on renewed allegations that during his time as vice president, members of his family had personally profited from his position in Ukraine and China, to which Biden pointed out Trump's own scandals regarding those countries. Trump repeatedly asked why Biden had not delivered on his 2020 campaign promises during his eight years in the White House, to which Biden responded, "we had a Republican Congress."

On October 26, the Minnesota Department of Health linked 23 COVID-19 cases to three Trump rallies held in the state in September. According to Johns Hopkins University, the average number of new cases in Beltrami County, where Trump's rally in Bemidji was held, was 2.85 new cases a day but had risen to 14.57 new cases per day four weeks after the rally. Minnesota traced one case each to a September 18 Joe Biden rally and an event on October 1 in Becker that was attended by Eric Trump. A campaign rally by Vice President Mike Pence in Hibbing in late October had "more than 650 people in attendance, exceeding Minnesota health guidelines to restrict crowds to 250 people." At least five aides to Pence, including his chief of staff Marc Short, had tested positive only two days earlier. National Security Advisor Robert O'Brien called Pence "an essential worker" who needed to be out campaigning.

=== Election Day and beyond ===
Electoral college results of the 2020 presidential election; Trump was defeated by Joe Biden.

Early on November 4, despite the fact that no clear winner of the election had been determined, Trump declared victory from the White House, stating that he "did win the election". At that point, results from states such as Pennsylvania, Wisconsin, Michigan and Georgia were unclear. Although Trump was leading in the vote count of those states at the time, experts believed that many of the still-uncounted votes—which included votes from large cities and mail-in ballots—would turn out to favor Biden.

On November 5, a federal judge dismissed a lawsuit by the Trump campaign to stop vote-counting in Pennsylvania. The Trump campaign had alleged that its observers were not given access to observe the vote, but during the hearing, its lawyers admitted that its observers were already present in the vote-counting room. Also that day, a state judge dismissed another lawsuit by the Trump campaign that alleged that in Georgia, late-arriving ballots were counted. The judge ruled that no evidence had been produced that the ballots were late. Meanwhile, in Michigan, a state judge dismissed the Trump's campaign's lawsuit requesting a pause in vote-counting to allow access to observers, as the judge noted that vote-counting had already finished in Michigan. That judge also noted that the official complaint did not state "why", "when, where, or by whom" an election observer was allegedly blocked from observing ballot-counting in Michigan.

On November 5, the Trump Victory in Wisconsin group declared it would be "chasing our absentee ballots over in Pennsylvania" for people who had yet to vote. Also, that day, the Kenosha for Trump group sent an email urging "volunteers to make phone calls to Pennsylvania Trump supporters to return their absentee ballots". However, votes had to be postmarked by November 3 to count as legal votes in Pennsylvania, and Trump himself had described late votes as election fraud.

By November 6, a growing number of Trump officials had admitted that the incumbent's loss was probable. On that day, election-calling organization Decision Desk HQ forecast that Trump had lost the election to Biden.

By November 7, news organizations ABC News, Associated Press, CBS News, CNN, Fox News, NBC News, Reuters, and the New York Times forecast that Trump had lost the election to Biden.

Still, the president refused to concede. The administrator of the GSA, Emily W. Murphy, refused to authorize transition funds until November 23. Most Senate Republicans, including Mitch McConnell, claimed that the election was still unsettled, and Attorney General William Barr authorized the Justice Department to investigate alleged "massive voter fraud," prompting Assistant AG Richard Pilger, director of the elections crimes branch in the Justice Department's Public Integrity Section, to resign in protest.

Reliable sources indicated that there were plans to resume full-scale campaigning in conjunction with recounts in Arizona, Georgia, and Wisconsin. On the week of November 9, Trump indicated to Kevin Cramer that "If this doesn't work out, I'll just run again in four years."

As repeated lawsuits failed throughout November, Trump admitted to Fox News on November 29 that "it's very hard to get a case to the Supreme Court." In an interview with the Associated Press published December 1, Attorney General William Barr acknowledged: "To date, we have not seen fraud on a scale that could have effected a different outcome in the election." By January, Trump had lost 60 lawsuits.

=== Trump–Raffensperger phone call ===
On January 2, 2021, during an hour-long conference call, Trump pressured Georgia Secretary of State Brad Raffensperger to change the state's vote totals by the 11,780 votes he needed to win the state. During the call, Trump falsely suggested that Raffensperger could have committed a criminal offense. On January 11, the phone call was cited in a new article of impeachment introduced in the House of Representatives.

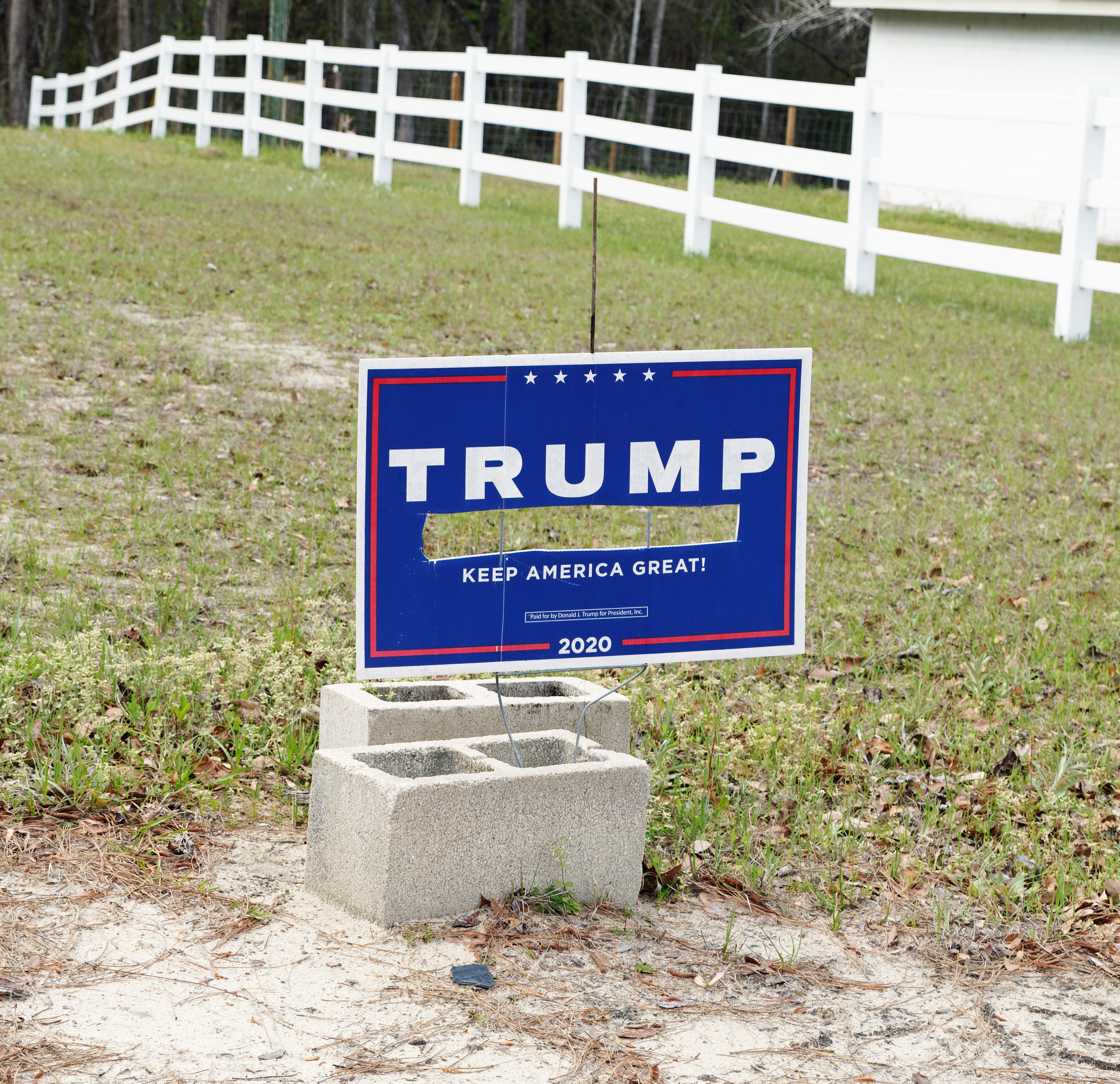
Sign with Pence removed after Pence fell out of favor

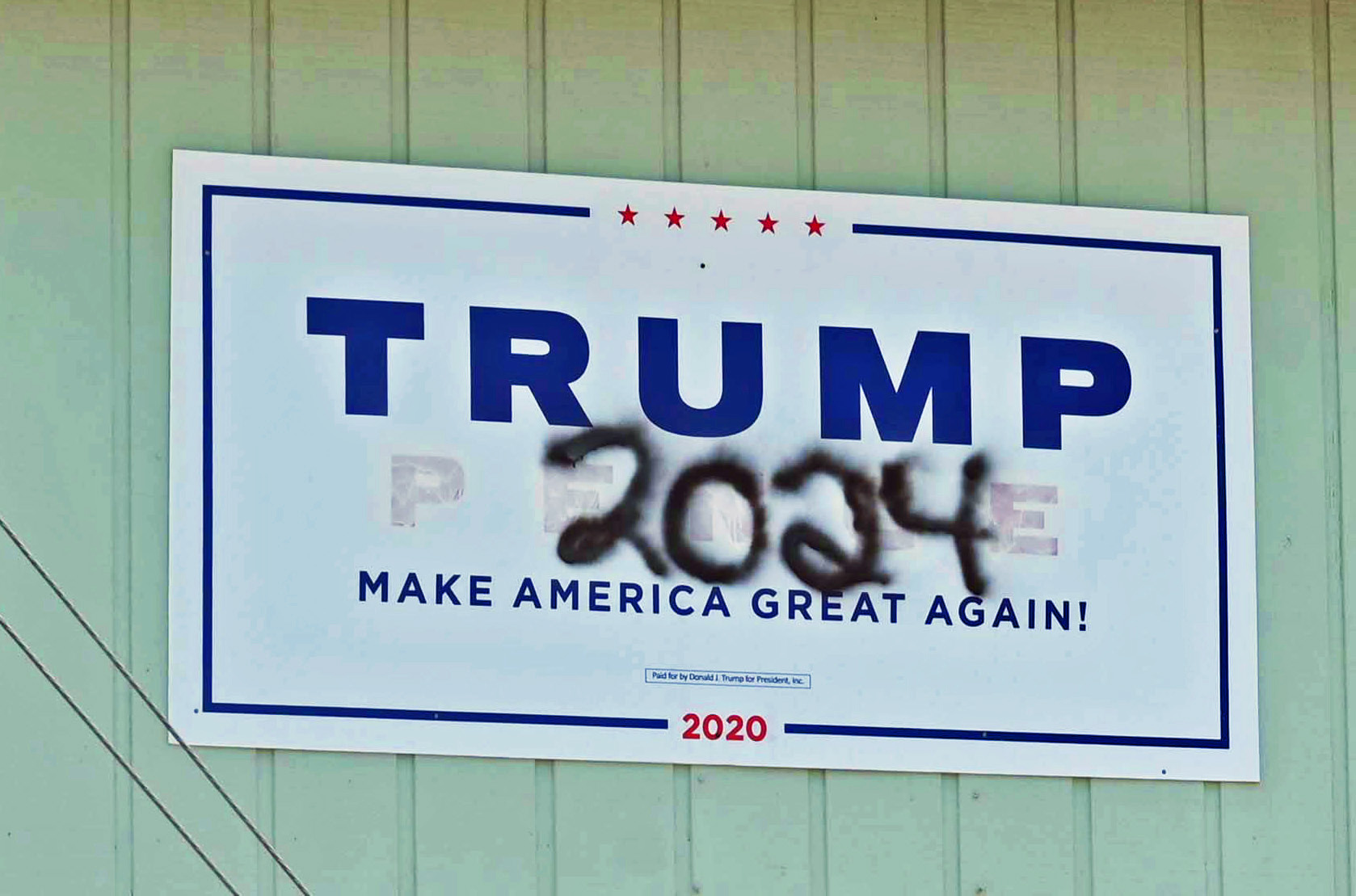
Sign for 2020 updated for 2024

=== Alternate electors ===
Self-declared "alternate electors" voted in protest; these votes had no legal validity. Well over 100 Republican representatives promised to contest the counting ceremony at the U.S. Capitol on January 6. Experts debated whether Trump was trying to perform a self-coup.

=== January 6 United States Capitol attack ===
On January 6, 2021, Trump spoke at a "March to Save America" rally on the Ellipse, where he encouraged the crowd to "fight like hell" and said he would be marching with them to the United States Capitol, although he did not join them in the end. The rioters broke into the Senate Chamber where the electoral college ballots were being counted, causing both the House and Senate to be evacuated. Five people died from the events, while dozens more were injured, and the Federal Bureau of Investigation opened over 170 investigations into the events.

== Polling ==
Opinion polls conducted in 2020 almost always showed Democratic nominee Joe Biden leading Trump nationally in general election matchups, with the former vice president's advantage usually extending beyond the margin of sampling error. The Trump campaign dismissed polls throughout the election season, noting how they erroneously predicted a Hillary Clinton victory in the 2016 presidential election. The sentiment has reflected a greater public distrust of polls in general, with several studies including one by the Pew Research Center showing that even when Biden lead Trump by a significant margin nationally, a majority of people still believed that Trump would win the election.

After keeping pace with Biden and even leading him in some key states throughout the spring, Trump's approval rating significantly weakened in June and July, causing him to fall behind in most of those battleground states as well as states that historically vote Republican such as Georgia, Texas and Kansas. By July 4, 2020, Politico reported that Trump was "trailing [Biden] by double digits in recent polls". A mid-July Washington Post/ABC News poll showed Biden's double-digit lead holding.

Trump, however, began to bounce back in early August. A national poll conducted then showed Biden leading by just three percent nationally. Trump also began to improve in state polls, such as in Iowa, where a poll showed Trump leading Biden by 48% to 45%, six percentage points less than Trump won the state with in 2016, but an improvement from where Trump's popularity was in the few months prior. Internal polls commissioned by the campaign showed Trump tied with or ahead of Biden in 17 key states, while a CNN poll showed Biden up by just one percentage point in 15 battleground states. Towards the end of the month though, Biden's advantage began to grow again, as Trump found himself down several points nationally in three highly rated polls: Fox News who had Biden leading 49% to 42%, the NBC/Wall Street Journal who had Biden leading 50% to 41%, and The Washington Post/ABC News who had Biden up 53% to 41%.

Trump got a slight bounce following the 2020 Republican National Convention, after which a Reuters/Ipsos poll showed Biden's national lead reduced to seven points. By the end of August, Trump was polling ahead of Biden in key states such as Ohio where he led 50% to 45%, and was polling neck-and-neck with the Democratic candidate in other battleground states such as Florida.

Trump's national polling numbers fell heavily again following his performance at the first presidential debate and his COVID-19 diagnosis at the end of September and beginning of October, as Biden's lead returned to double digits regularly. A Washington Post/ABC News poll taken around this period showed Biden's lead to be 53% to 43%. Trump, however, still managed to keep pace with Biden in the battleground states, thus giving him an outside chance of retaining the presidency via the Electoral College as Election Day approached.

== Finances ==
Trump began fundraising for his reelection campaign immediately after his inauguration, whereas his predecessors had waited years to do this. By September 2020, Trump's 2020 reelection effort, including the Republican National Committee, had spent over $800 million. At that time, Trump had not yet contributed any of his own money to his reelection effort, although he was reportedly considering contributing $100 million. (He had, by contrast, contributed $66 million of his own money to his 2016 campaign.) Bloomberg News said, "it would be unprecedented for an incumbent president to put his own money toward winning a second term."

Donald J. Trump for President, Inc. quarterly financial summaries
Quarter	Cash on hand at beginning	Receipts	Disbursements	Cash on hand at end	Debts owed to campaign	Debts owed by campaign
2017 Q1	7,611,702.92	7,120,150.93	6,370,250.57	8,361,603.28	0.00	0.00
2017 Q2	8,361,603.28	7,954,888.84	4,369,374.54	11,947,117.58	0.00	0.00
2017 Q3	11,947,117.58	10,129,336.13	4,071,599.06	18,004,854.65	0.00	0.00
2017 Q4	18,004,854.65	6,895,755.62	2,791,451.84	22,109,158.43	0.00	0.00
2018 Q1	22,109,158.43	10,106,775.80	3,876,088.55	28,339,845.68	0.00	0.00
2018 Q2	28,339,845.68	8,368,358.11	3,621,333.93	33,086,869.86	0.00	0.00
2018 Q3	33,086,869.86	10,026,045.24	7,705,411.15	35,407,503.95	0.00	0.00
2018 Q4	35,407,503.95	6,946,974.43	23,061,577.18	19,292,901.20	0.00	1,035,597.65
Total 2017–2018	7,611,702.92	67,548,285.10	55,867,086.82	19,292,901.20	0.00	1,035,597.65
2019 Q1	19,292,901.20	30,304,180.03	8,834,888.53	40,762,192.70	0.00	528,116.26
2019 Q2	40,762,192.70	26,516,845.63	10,541,672.69	56,737,365.64	0.00	294,070.29
2019 Q3	56,737,365.64	40,958,012.84	14,479,108.22	83,216,270.26	0.00	216,915.00
2019 Q4	83,216,270.26	45,980,113.53	26,410,679.60	102,785,704.19	0.00	170,377.55
2020 Q1	102,785,704.19	34,258,184.38	38,573,302.28	98,470,586.29	0.00	234,670.08
Grand total	7,611,702.92	245,565,621.50	154,706,738.14	98,470,586.29	0.00	234,670.08

=== Funding pace ===
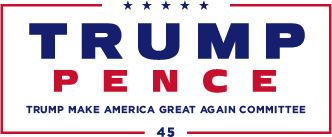
Logo of the Trump Make America Great Again Committee

At the end of the first quarter of 2017, the campaign's three committees ("Donald J. Trump for President", "Trump Victory", and "Trump Make America Great Again Committee") reported raising a combined $13.2 million, the majority of which had come from small donors.

Trump's campaign and the Republican National Committee ultimately raised a combined $55 million in the first quarter. According to the National Review's Kelly Jane Torrance, Barack Obama and the Democratic National Committee had raised roughly $16 million in the same period of Obama's first term.

On March 17, 2017, the campaign saw what its highest single-day contribution total was, with the campaign and its joint-fundraising-committee raising a combined total of $314,000. By the end of May the RNC had raised more than $62 million in 2017. The RNC had already received more online donations than they had in the entire year of 2016.

On April 14, 2019, the campaign announced that it had raised $30 million in the first quarter of 2019, far outpacing the campaigns of his individual Democratic opponents in the same period. Average donations were $34.26, and nearly 99 percent of donations to the campaign were $200 or less. In addition, the Republican National Committee brought in $45.8 million in first-quarter 2019.

=== Notable expenditures and allegations of grifting ===
==== Trump properties ====
In June 2018, ProPublica reported that Trump Organization properties had received "at least $16.1 million...from his campaign, Republican organizations, and government agencies" since late 2015. In October 2019, OpenSecrets found that total spending on Trump properties had increased to $16.8 million even when just considering payments made by the Trump campaign and other Republican political campaigns and PACs (leaving aside the government agencies).

During the first three months of 2017, the Trump 2020 campaign reported spending $6.3 million, of which nearly $500,000 (over 6% of its spending) was to companies owned by Trump. In the Trump 2020 campaign's first two years (2017 and 2018), it paid more than $890,000 in rent for space in Trump Tower, while the Republican National Committee paid $225,000. As of October 2020, the campaign's committees had directed more than $17.9 million of campaign donor money to Trump properties, while the Republican National Committee had paid $3.0 million.

==== Legal and compliance work ====
In a period spanning 2015–2020, the Trump campaign (including its 2016 and 2020 versions) used at least $58.4 million of donor funds to pay for legal and compliance work. (This was more than 5 times what the Obama campaign and the Democratic National Committee had paid for legal and compliance work during an equivalent period eight years earlier.) Federal Election Commission filings do not reveal how much the Trump campaign spent on any specific case as contrasted with routine legal work. To look at a narrower slice of this spending, in the third quarter of 2017, the Trump campaign spent $4.1 million (27% of its expenditures) on legal fees, including the personal legal expenses of Trump and his family. By this point, 10% of the campaign's overall spending since the beginning of the year had been on legal fees.

==== Advertisements ====
As of March 2019, Trump's campaign had spent almost twice as much on Facebook and Google ads as the entire Democratic field combined. During 2020, Donald Trump's campaign had spent $201 million on digital marketing, and $175 million on traditional television ads. Comparatively, the Biden campaign during this same time frame had significantly ramped up their efforts, spending $166 million on digital marketing, and $250 million on traditional television ads, respectively, outspending Trump's campaign in television ads, but falling behind in digital marketing. Donald Trump and Joe Biden's advertisement efforts during the 2020 election cycle are the two most expensive in history.

==== Memorabilia ====
During the first three months of his presidency, his reelection campaign spent more than $4 million on memorabilia.

== Groups supporting Trump ==
=== The Republican Party ===
On January 23, 2019, the Republican National Committee, in a unanimous vote, informally endorsed the president.

=== Super PACs ===
Super PACs supporting Trump's reelection campaign include Committee to Defend the President, Great America PAC, and Great America Committee. The Great America PAC received donations from, among others, former racer Walker Evans and Insperity executive Jay Mincks. The Committee to Defend the President PAC received contributions from, among others, Enterprise Products executive Ralph S. Cunningham.

The Center for Public Integrity published an analysis of 2017 first-quarter federal campaign spending records which revealed that two Super PACs supporting Trump, Great America PAC and Committee to Defend the President, had spent a combined $1.32 million on the 2020 election campaign. Ted Harvey serves as the chairman of the Committee to Defend the President. Eric Beach and Ed Rollins serve as co-chairmen of Great America PAC. Both PACs have previously been accused by the FEC of poorly maintaining financial records and had been threatened with penalties. The Center for Public Integrity also found that several other pro-Trump PACs had already been founded in 2017, but most of them had yet to be very active. One such PAC was America First Action, which was founded by the CEO of a political consulting firm for which Trump's 2020 campaign treasurer is the senior vice president.

On May 17, 2017, Mike Pence filed FEC paperwork to form Great America Committee, a PAC that would be headed by his former campaign staffers Nick Ayers and Marty Obst. This is the first time in U.S. history a sitting vice president has founded such a political organization.

On August 7, Marc Lotter, a spokesperson for Mike Pence, confirmed to MSNBC's Hallie Jackson that the vice president had hosted Republican donors, including mega-donors Charles and David Koch, at Number One Observatory Circle.

At the end of the third quarter, the FEC calculated that in 2017 super PACS and other outside groups supporting Trump had spent more than $2 million.

==== Amount spent by outside groups in support of campaign ====
Table displays the amount that groups have reported to the FEC they have spent in support of Trump's candidacy from January 1, 2015, to December 31, 2020.

Group	Amount
The Committee to Defend the President	13,977,787.95
Great America PAC	13,841,286.33
Other	31,416,965.73
Total	59,236,040.01

=== Other groups ===
In late January 2017, several members of Trump's 2016 campaign staff formed America First Policies, a pro-Trump political nonprofit. Those involved included former deputy campaign chairs Rick Gates and David Bossie. Brad Parscale and Katrina Pierson were also involved. Additionally involved were Nick Ayers and Marty Obst, both of whom served as advisors to Mike Pence during the 2016 campaign. Trump's former White House Deputy Chief of Staff Katie Walsh has also joined the organization. Near the end of May, members of the organization (including Walsh) participated in meetings at the RNC's D.C. offices with members Trump's family to discuss campaign strategy.

In 2017, Matt Braynard, a key member of Trump's 2016 campaign staff, established the organization Look Ahead America. The organization took steps to target inactive voters in places such as New Hampshire, a state Trump came close to winning in 2016. Look Ahead America claimed it would not coordinate its efforts with the president. In the week after the 2020 election, Braynard launched a group called The Voter Integrity Fund to review public records for indications of election malfeasance. On December 1, 2020, he tweeted that Biden's election was illegitimate: "If the issues we raised are not resolved...[Biden] cannot be considered 'president' but [should] instead [be] referred to as the #presidentialoccupant." Trump retweeted Braynard's comment several hours later.

In August 2018, a group called the 45 Alliance was formed. All three of the group's officers had served on Trump's transition team, and two of them also served in Trump's White House. During the calendar year in which the 45 Alliance was formed, it was entirely funded by Trump for America, a nonprofit that supported Trump's 2016 transition ($150,000); by America First Policies ($150,000); and by the Republican National Committee ($75,000). Neil Corkery is in charge of the 45 Alliance's finances. "He has ties to several high-profile dark money operations," Walker Davis wrote, "like the Wellspring Committee and Judicial Crisis Network. In 2018, an anonymous million-dollar contribution to President Trump's inauguration was linked to him."

Black Voices for Trump was an initiative of the campaign which raised support for Donald Trump among African Americans. In August 2023, Harrison Floyd, the executive director of Black Voices for Trump, was charged with three felonies as part of the prosecution of Donald Trump in Georgia.

== Rallies ==
2020 campaign rallies
Date of rally	City	State	Venue	Estimated attendance	Source
Monday, February 11, 2019	El Paso	TX	El Paso County Coliseum	6,000	
Thursday, March 28, 2019	Grand Rapids	MI	Van Andel Arena	14,000	
Saturday, April 27, 2019	Green Bay	WI	Resch Center	10,000	
Wednesday, May 8, 2019	Panama City Beach	FL	Aaron Bessant Park Amphitheater	7,500	
Monday, May 20, 2019	Montoursville	PA	Williamsport Regional Airport	15,000	
Tuesday, June 18, 2019	Orlando	FL	Amway Center	20,000	
Wednesday, July 17, 2019	Greenville	NC	Williams Arena	8,000	
Thursday, August 1, 2019	Cincinnati	OH	U.S. Bank Arena	17,500	
Thursday, August 15, 2019	Manchester	NH	SNHU Arena	11,000	
Monday, September 9, 2019	Fayetteville	NC	Crown Expo Center	5,500	
Monday, September 16, 2019	Rio Rancho	NM	Santa Ana Star Center	8,000	
Thursday, October 10, 2019	Minneapolis	MN	Target Center	20,000	
Thursday, October 17, 2019	Dallas	TX	American Airlines Center	21,000	
Tuesday, November 26, 2019	Sunrise	FL	BB&T Center (Sunrise, Florida)	20,000	
Tuesday, December 10, 2019	Hershey	PA	Giant Center	12,000	
Wednesday, December 18, 2019	Battle Creek	MI	Kellogg Arena	5,400	
Thursday, January 9, 2020	Toledo	OH	Huntington Center	8,000	
Tuesday, January 14, 2020	Milwaukee	WI	UW–Milwaukee Panther Arena	12,000	
Tuesday, January 28, 2020	Wildwood	NJ	Wildwoods Convention Center	7,500	
Thursday, January 30, 2020	Des Moines	IA	Knapp Center	7,600	
Monday, February 10, 2020	Manchester	NH	SNHU Arena	12,000	
Wednesday, February 19, 2020	Phoenix	AZ	Arizona Veterans Memorial Coliseum	14,000	
Thursday, February 20, 2020	Colorado Springs	CO	Broadmoor World Arena	8,500	
Friday, February 21, 2020	Las Vegas	NV	Las Vegas Convention Center	15,000	
Friday, February 28, 2020	North Charleston	SC	North Charleston Coliseum	13,000	
Monday, March 2, 2020	Charlotte	NC	Bojangles' Coliseum	10,000	
Saturday, June 20, 2020	Tulsa	OK	BOK Center	6,200	
Tuesday, June 23, 2020	Phoenix	AZ	Dream City Church	3,000	
Monday, August 17, 2020	Mankato	MN	Mankato Regional Airport		
Monday, August 17, 2020	Oshkosh	WI	Wittman Regional Airport		
Tuesday, August 18, 2020	Yuma	AZ	Yuma International Airport		
Thursday, August 20, 2020	Old Forge	PA	Mariotti Building Products		
Friday, August 28, 2020	Londonderry	NH	Manchester–Boston Regional Airport		
Thursday, September 3, 2020	Latrobe	PA	Arnold Palmer Regional Airport		
Tuesday, September 8, 2020	Winston-Salem	NC	Smith Reynolds Airport		
Thursday, September 10, 2020	Freeland	MI	MBS International Airport		
Saturday, September 12, 2020	Minden	NV	Minden–Tahoe Airport		
Sunday, September 13, 2020	Henderson	NV	Xtreme Manufacturing		
Thursday, September 17, 2020	Mosinee	WI	Central Wisconsin Airport		
Friday, September 18, 2020	Bemidji	MN	Bemidji Regional Airport		
Saturday, September 19, 2020	Fayetteville	NC	Fayetteville Regional Airport		
Monday, September 21, 2020	Vandalia	OH	Dayton International Airport		
Monday, September 21, 2020	Swanton	OH	Toledo Express Airport		
Tuesday, September 22, 2020	Moon Township	PA	Pittsburgh International Airport		
Thursday, September 24, 2020	Jacksonville	FL	Cecil Airport		
Friday, September 25, 2020	Newport News	VA	Newport News/Williamsburg International Airport		
Saturday, September 26, 2020	Middletown	PA	Harrisburg International Airport		
Wednesday, September 30, 2020	Duluth	MN	Duluth International Airport		
Monday, October 12, 2020	Sanford	FL	Orlando Sanford International Airport		
Tuesday, October 13, 2020	Johnstown	PA	John Murtha Johnstown–Cambria County Airport		
Wednesday, October 14, 2020	Des Moines	IA	Des Moines International Airport		
Thursday, October 15, 2020	Greenville	NC	Pitt-Greenville Airport		
Friday, October 16, 2020	Ocala	FL	Ocala International Airport		
Friday, October 16, 2020	Macon	GA	Middle Georgia Regional Airport		
Saturday, October 17, 2020	Muskegon	MI	Muskegon County Airport		
Saturday, October 17, 2020	Janesville	WI	Southern Wisconsin Regional Airport		
Sunday, October 18, 2020	Carson City	NV	Carson City Airport		
Monday, October 19, 2020	Prescott	AZ	Prescott Regional Airport		
Monday, October 19, 2020	Tucson	AZ	Tucson International Airport		
Tuesday, October 20, 2020	Erie	PA	Erie International Airport		
Wednesday, October 21, 2020	Gastonia	NC	Gastonia Municipal Airport		
Friday, October 23, 2020	The Villages	FL	The Villages Polo Club		
Friday, October 23, 2020	Pensacola	FL	Pensacola International Airport		
Saturday, October 24, 2020	Lumberton	NC	Robeson County Fairgrounds		
Saturday, October 24, 2020	Circleville	OH	Pickaway Agriculture and Event Center		
Saturday, October 24, 2020	Waukesha	WI	Waukesha County Airport		
Sunday, October 25, 2020	Manchester	NH	Manchester–Boston Regional Airport		
Monday, October 26, 2020	Allentown	PA	HoverTech International		
Monday, October 26, 2020	Lititz	PA	Lancaster Airport		
Monday, October 26, 2020	Martinsburg	PA	Altoona–Blair County Airport		
Tuesday, October 27, 2020	Lansing	MI	Capital Region International Airport		
Tuesday, October 27, 2020	West Salem	WI	La Crosse Fairgrounds Speedway		
Tuesday, October 27, 2020	Omaha	NE	Eppley Airfield		
Wednesday, October 28, 2020	Bullhead City	AZ	Laughlin/Bullhead International Airport		
Wednesday, October 28, 2020	Goodyear	AZ	Phoenix Goodyear Airport		
Thursday, October 29, 2020	Tampa	FL	Raymond James Stadium		
Thursday, October 29, 2020	Fayetteville	NC	Fayetteville Regional Airport		
Friday, October 30, 2020	Waterford Township	MI	Oakland County International Airport		
Friday, October 30, 2020	Green Bay	WI	Green Bay–Austin Straubel International Airport		
Friday, October 30, 2020	Rochester	MN	Rochester International Airport		
Saturday, October 31, 2020	Newtown	PA	The Keith House		
Saturday, October 31, 2020	Reading	PA	Reading Regional Airport		
Saturday, October 31, 2020	Butler	PA	Pittsburgh-Butler Regional Airport		
Saturday, October 31, 2020	Montoursville	PA	Williamsport Regional Airport		
Sunday, November 1, 2020	Washington	MI	Michigan Stars Sports Center		
Sunday, November 1, 2020	Dubuque	IA	Dubuque Regional Airport		
Sunday, November 1, 2020	Hickory	NC	Hickory Regional Airport		
Sunday, November 1, 2020	Rome	GA	Richard B. Russell Airport		
Sunday, November 1, 2020	Opa-locka	FL	Miami–Opa Locka Executive Airport		
Monday, November 2, 2020	Fayetteville	NC	Fayetteville Regional Airport		
Monday, November 2, 2020	Scranton	PA	Wilkes-Barre/Scranton International Airport		
Monday, November 2, 2020	Traverse City	MI	Cherry Capital Airport		
Monday, November 2, 2020	Kenosha	WI	Kenosha Regional Airport		
Monday, November 2, 2020	Grand Rapids	MI	Gerald R. Ford International Airport		

== Technology ==
The Trump campaign used "geofencing". This technology detects when a smartphone is within a narrow geographic area like a church or a sports stadium, and it captures identifying information from that device. This allowed political marketers to gather names, addresses, and voter registration status of the people who were present at the event and who presumably share some ideological, religious, or other demographic affinities. In January 2020, The New York Times reported that "the Trump campaign is far ahead of the Democratic Party in the use of this technology".

== See also ==
- Donald Trump 2000 presidential campaign
- Donald Trump 2016 presidential campaign
- Donald Trump 2024 presidential campaign
- List of Donald Trump 2020 presidential campaign endorsements
- List of Republicans who opposed the Donald Trump 2020 presidential campaign
- Political positions of Donald Trump
- Presidency of Donald Trump
- 2020 Republican Party presidential primaries
