= Alyssa Farah Griffin =

American political strategist (born 1989)

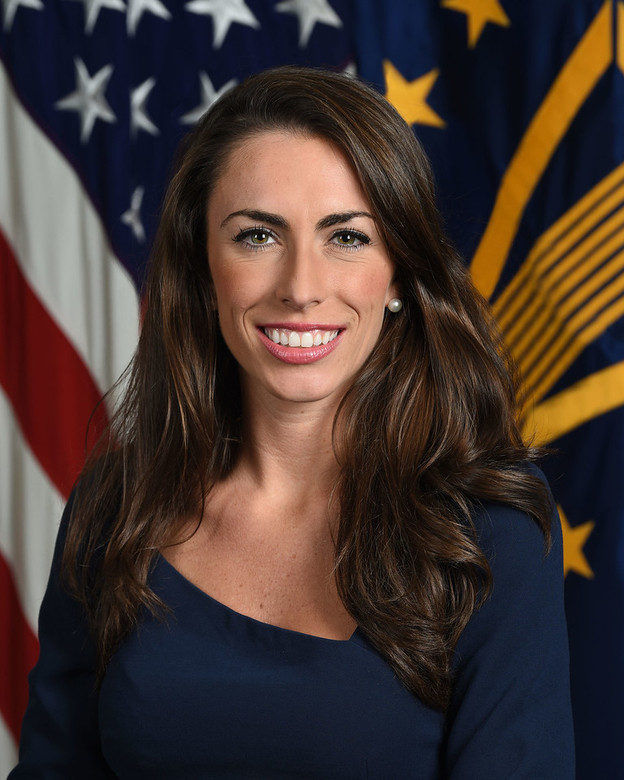
- Official portrait, 2019

3rd White House Director of Strategic Communications
- In office April 7, 2020 – December 4, 2020
- President: Donald Trump
- Preceded by: Mercedes Schlapp
- Succeeded by: Position eliminated (2021)

Press Secretary of the Department of Defense
- In office September 2019 – April 7, 2020
- President: Donald Trump
- Preceded by: Dana White
- Succeeded by: John Kirby

Press Secretary to the Vice President
- In office October 2017 – September 2019
- Vice President: Mike Pence
- Preceded by: Marc Lotter
- Succeeded by: Katie Waldman

Personal details
- Born: Alyssa Alexandra Farah; June 15, 1989 (age 37) Los Angeles, California, U.S.
- Party: Republican
- Spouse: Justin Griffin (m. 2021)
- Children: 1
- Parent: Joseph Farah (father)
- Education: Patrick Henry College (BA)

Alyssa Alexandra Farah Griffin (née Farah; /ˈfɛrə/; born June 15, 1989) is an American political strategist and television personality. She was the White House director of strategic communications and Assistant to the President in 2020 during the presidency of Donald Trump. In addition to appearing on CNN as a commentator, she is a co-host of the talk show The View, for which she received a nomination for a Daytime Emmy Award.

Griffin was press secretary for U.S. Vice President Mike Pence and special assistant to President Donald Trump from October 2017 to September 2019. In 2019, she was appointed the youngest press secretary of The Pentagon in history until the appointment of Kingsley Wilson in 2025. She served as deputy assistant to the secretary of defense for public affairs and the press secretary for the United States Department of Defense from 2019 to 2020.

== Early life ==
Alyssa Alexandra Farah was born on June 15, 1989, in Los Angeles. Her father, Joseph Farah, is a journalist who was executive news editor at the Los Angeles Herald Examiner before moving to Northern California to become editor of The Sacramento Union in 1990. He later founded the far-right website WorldNetDaily. Griffin describes herself as having been "raised in the right-wing media".

After graduating from Bella Vista High School in 2007, Griffin earned a bachelor's degree in journalism and public policy from Patrick Henry College.

== Career ==
Before 2014, Griffin had written articles for her father's far-right website WorldNetDaily, where she served as a "special Washington correspondent for WND." In 2010, Griffin was a media intern for Congressman Tom McClintock and began a one-year position as an associate producer on The Laura Ingraham Show. In the 2012 presidential election cycle, Griffin was the spokesperson for the College Republican National Committee, traveling the country discussing the youth vote. In 2014, she was named press secretary for Congressman Mark Meadows; she was later named as his communications director. She went on to work as the communications director for the Freedom Caucus in the U.S. House of Representatives, serving under Jim Jordan and Mark Meadows.

In September 2017, she was appointed special assistant to the president and press secretary to Vice President Mike Pence. As press secretary to the vice president, she traveled with Pence on numerous trips, domestic and foreign, and was part of the official U.S. delegations to the Munich Security Conference and ASEAN Summit.

In September 2019, Griffin became press secretary for the United States Department of Defense, after the role had been vacant for nearly a year. She was also appointed director of media affairs. In this role, Griffin was the chief spokesperson for the department.

In April 2020, it was reported that Meadows, by then Trump's chief of staff, had considered bringing Griffin on as a White House press secretary. She joined the White House Office as the White House director of strategic communications on April 7, 2020. In August 2020, The Washington Post reported that Griffin played an important role in shaping the Trump administration's coronavirus response.

Griffin resigned as White House communications director on December 3, 2020, effective the next day. At the time it was reported she planned to start a consulting firm "focusing on the corporate, political and defense realms" and that she had initially planned to leave before the election according to one person speaking anonymously.

The day before January 6, 2021, United States Capitol attack, Griffin publicly condemned Trump supporters for harassing Senator Mitt Romney. She denounced the attack, and days later, on January 8, blamed Trump for inciting the attack and suggested that he should resign.

In a February 7, 2021, interview on CNN, Griffin questioned the constitutionality of the second impeachment of Donald Trump and stated she believed censuring would be more appropriate. When asked if she would support censure after the impeachment if it fails, she said it was "an open question" before recommending the country should "move on" from the Capitol raid.

In February 2021, Griffin became a visiting fellow with the Independent Women's Forum. In June 2021, Griffin co-authored an editorial with Johanna Maska, who served as President Obama's director of press advance. In the editorial, which was published by USA Today, the two discuss the need to overcome the political divide in the U.S.

Griffin voluntarily spoke to the January 6 House select committee several times in 2021. In December 2021, CNN revealed that Griffin was the author of a text to former White House Chief of Staff Mark Meadows calling for Donald Trump to condemn the attack saying "people will die." In June 2022, Griffin revealed that Trump stated privately several times in November 2020 that he had lost the 2020 election and she related that once while watching Biden on television, Trump said "Can you believe I lost to this guy?"

On July 27, 2022, she said the Justice Department had not contacted her regarding its investigation into January 6. During her testimony to the January 6 select committee in September 2022, Cassidy Hutchinson claimed that Griffin agreed to act as her backchannel so she could avoid letting her attorney Stefan Passantino, a Trump loyalist, know that she was giving additional testimony.

In 2021, Griffin joined CNN as a political contributor. Griffin was appointed a fellow of the Georgetown Institute of Politics and Public Service for spring 2022. In 2022, Griffin became a permanent co-host of The View for the talk show's 26th season after making several guest appearances throughout 2021 and 2022. In 2024, she received a Daytime Emmy Award for Outstanding Daytime Talk Series Host nomination for her work.

In 2024, Griffin said that she voted for Kamala Harris in the 2024 presidential election, saying that it was the first time she had voted for a Democrat.

== Personal life ==
In 2019, Griffin was a victim of an impersonation scam using her name to target members of Congress. The matter was investigated by the FBI.

In 2020, Griffin became engaged to Justin Griffin, a graduate of the New York University Stern School of Business and a grandson of Republican Party activist Samuel A. Tamposi. They were married in November 2021. In 2022, Griffin revealed on The View that members of her family, including her father and stepmother, boycotted her wedding because of her differences with Trump.

Griffin announced her pregnancy on The View in October 2025, a topic she had previously been asked about. Their son was born on February 10, 2026.

== See also ==
- List of former Trump administration officials who endorsed Kamala Harris
- List of Republicans who oppose the Donald Trump 2024 presidential campaign
