= Conservative Political Action Conference =

Annual meeting in the US and other countries

- Dates: February/March/July (dates vary)
- Frequency: Annual
- Locations: Gaylord National Resort & Convention Center, National Harbor, Maryland, U.S. (2024)
- Inaugurated: 1974; 52 years ago
- Most recent: March 25–28, 2026
- Organizer: American Conservative Union
- Website: www.cpac.org

The Conservative Political Action Conference (CPAC /ˈsiːpæk/ SEE-pak) is an annual political conference attended by conservative activists and officials from across the United States. CPAC is hosted by the American Conservative Union (ACU). The first CPAC took place in 1974.

The same name and acronym has been used for conferences in other countries.

== History ==
President Ronald Reagan speaking at the 1985 CPAC

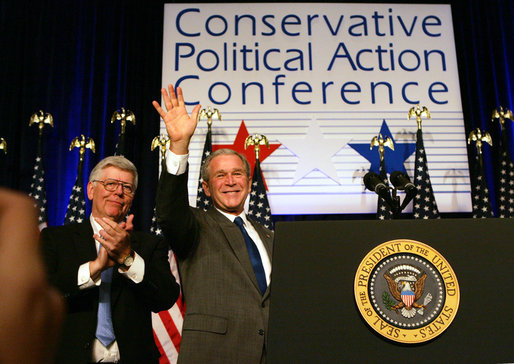
President George W. Bush speaking at the 2008 CPAC

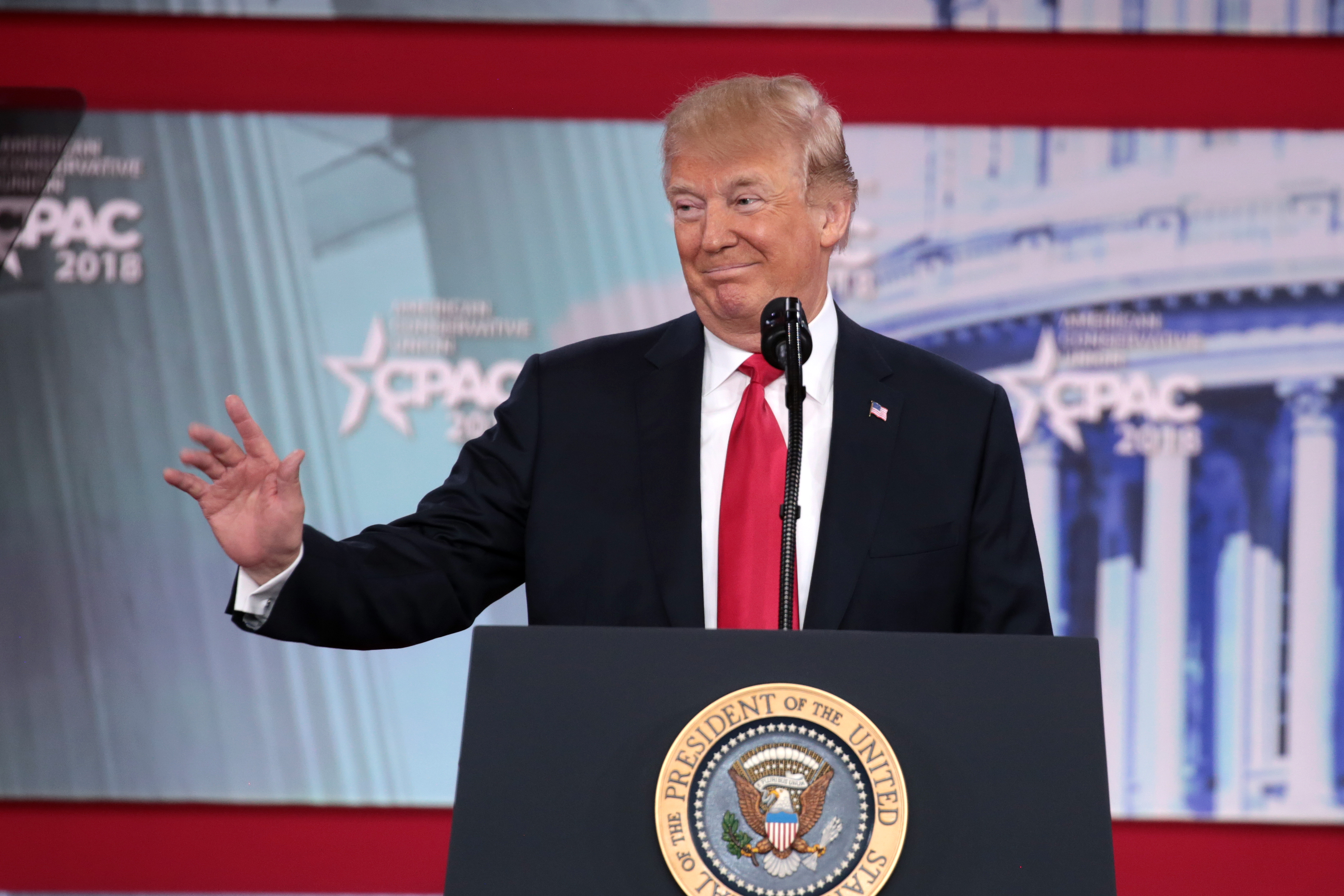
President Donald Trump speaking at the 2018 CPAC

=== 1974 ===
The conference was founded in 1974 by the American Conservative Union and Young Americans for Freedom as a small gathering of dedicated conservatives. Ronald Reagan gave the inaugural keynote speech at CPAC in 1974. The presidential hopeful used it to share his vision for the country—"A Shining City Upon a Hill," words borrowed from John Winthrop.

=== 2010–2017 ===
The 2010 CPAC featured co-sponsorship for the first time from GOProud, a gay conservative group. GOProud is credited in the media for initiating talks with ACU to invite Donald Trump to speak at CPAC 2011. The 2011 CPAC speech Trump gave is credited with helping kick-start his political career within the Republican Party. Christopher R. Barron, co-founder of GOProud, who later endorsed Trump's 2016 presidential campaign and launched LGBT for Trump, said he "would love to see Mr. Trump run for president".

In 2014, CPAC extended an invitation to American Atheists, which was immediately withdrawn on the same day due to controversial statements by AA's president David Silverman, who declared his group was going to "enlighten conservatives" and that "the Christian right should be threatened by us". The 2015 CPAC featured Jamila Bey who became the first atheist activist to address CPAC's annual meeting.

The 2016 CPAC featured co-sponsorship for the first time from the Log Cabin Republicans. In December 2016, CPAC extended a speaking invitation to conservative blogger Milo Yiannopoulos, despite his history of controversial views on feminism, racial minorities, and transgender issues. The invitation was canceled when the Reagan Battalion re-posted a video of 2016 and 2015 YouTube videos in which Yiannopoulos is heard making comments defending sexual relationships between adult men and 13-year-old boys, citing his own sexual experiences at that age with a Catholic priest.

Richard Spencer, a figurehead of the alt-right and a white supremacist, entered the lobby of the Gaylord National Hotel on February 23, 2017, in an attempt to access CPAC. Organizers of the conference ejected him from the hotel as soon as his presence was discovered, citing his "repugnant [views which] ... have absolutely nothing to do with conservatism or what we do here" as cause for rejecting his admission to CPAC. ACU's Executive Director Dan Schneider castigated Spencer and the alt-right in a main-stage speech, calling them "garden-variety, left-wing fascists," and saying that the alt-right "despises everything [conservatives] believe in".

Media members across the political spectrum condemned the intrusion as yet another attempt by groups like the alt-right to conceal their extremist views within a legitimate philosophy. Opinion columns in The New York Times, and articles in Mother Jones and Rolling Stone voiced concern about the 2017 interview of former Trump adviser Steve Bannon and former Trump Chief-of-Staff Reince Priebus with ACU Chairman Matt Schlapp, advocating for the American Right to reject the tenets of the alt-right, including homophobia, xenophobia, sexism, and racism.

=== 2019 ===
The 2019 Conservative Political Action Conference was held at the Gaylord National Resort & Convention Center in Oxon Hill, Maryland, from February 28 to March 2, 2019. The event was headlined by President Trump, with many additional speakers. Themes throughout the conference were fighting against socialism, abortion, and criticizing Alexandria Ocasio-Cortez and the Green New Deal.

=== 2020–2021 ===
In 2020, CPAC hosted its main event just prior to the federal emergency declaration regarding the COVID-19 pandemic. On Saturday, March 7, 2020, ACU confirmed that an attendee at the 2020 CPAC had tested positive for COVID-19. Senator Ted Cruz, Representatives Matt Gaetz, Paul Gosar, Doug Collins, and Mark Meadows had recent contact with the patient, who remained unnamed; none of whom would go on to test positive immediately after the event.

The following year, the 2021 Conservative Political Action Conference was held during the COVID-19 pandemic. The previous customary venue for CPAC, Gaylord National Resort & Convention Center in National Harbor, Maryland, was subject to restrictions in Maryland, issued by Republican governor Larry Hogan, who had restricted gathering sizes to a maximum of 10.

As a result, the conference was relocated to Orlando, Florida, which had removed all prior pandemic-related limits on gathering sizes. The event was still subject to Orlando mandatory mask-wearing rules. Notwithstanding those restrictions, numerous attendees chose to not wear masks during the event, despite frequent announcements by the event's organizers and hotel staff, requesting attendees to comply with the local mask-wearing mandate. Florida Governor Ron DeSantis characterized the state's resistance to pandemic gathering-size limits as comporting with the state's status as "an oasis of freedom." The conference's theme, "America Uncancelled", sought to highlight alleged attempts by social media companies, the Democratic Party, U.S. universities and progressive organizations to censor conservatives' public expression of their political views. The conference's main event was a closing address by former U.S. president Donald Trump, his first public address and political speech since leaving office. Trump spent significant portions of the speech criticizing his successor, Joe Biden. The speech received significant media coverage in anticipation of Trump's announcement of his post-presidential political activity.

A second 2021 conference was held in Dallas from July 9 to 11 at the Hilton Anatole hotel. The theme of the conference was immigration policy and border security, in the context of the ongoing migrant crisis at the U.S. Southern Border.

=== 2022 ===
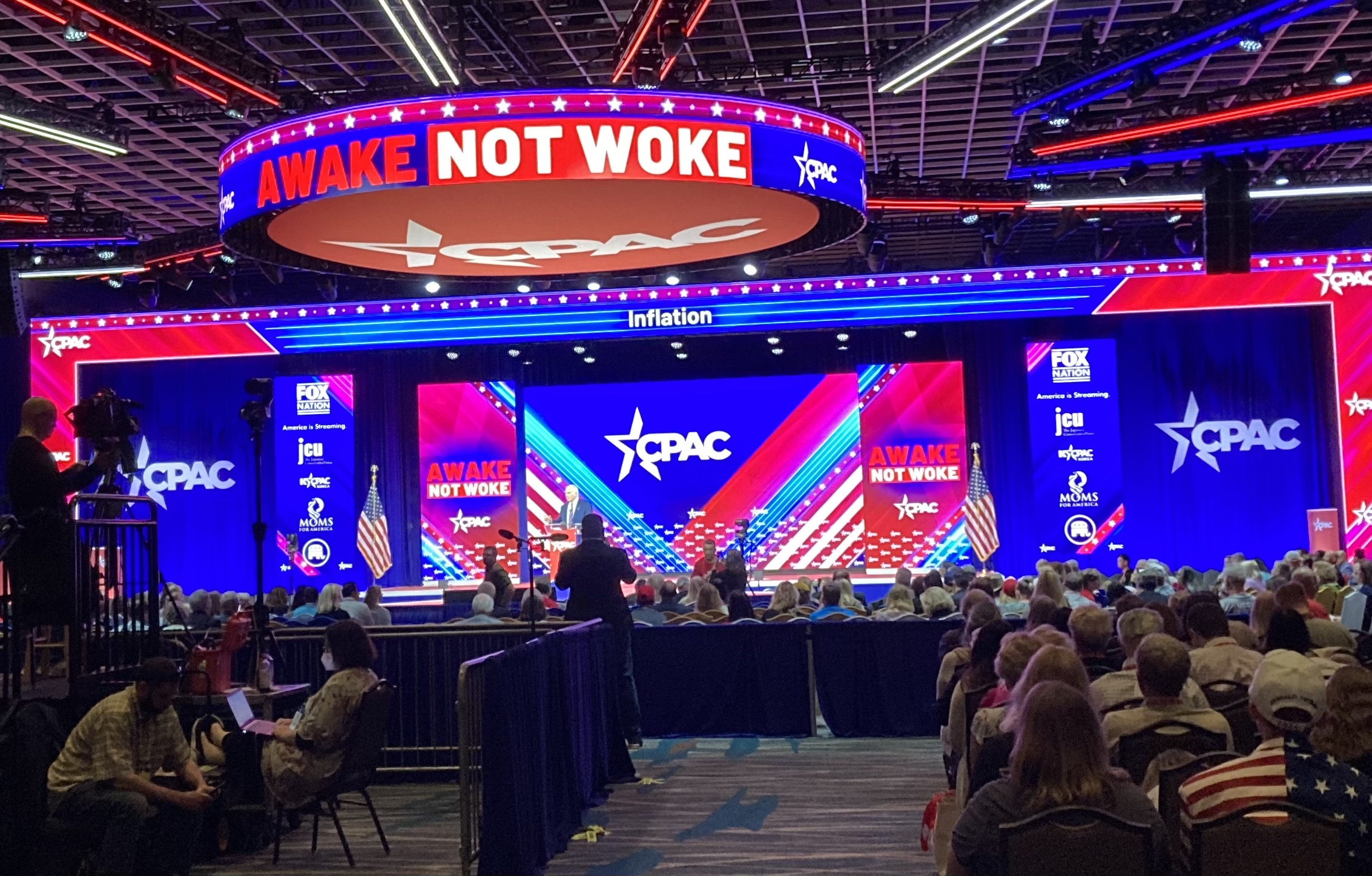
CPAC Florida 2022

The 2022 conference was held on February 24 to 27 in Orlando, Florida. Speakers included Trump, Florida governor Ron DeSantis, and former Democratic congresswoman and presidential candidate Tulsi Gabbard.

As in 2021, a second conference was held in Dallas, Texas from August 4 to 6. Speakers included Trump, Hungarian Prime Minister Viktor Orbán, Arizona Republican Gubernatorial candidate Kari Lake, and many congressional representatives.

As part of one of the 2022 break-out sessions, the Dallas CPAC conference displayed a banner across their main stage with the phrase "We are all domestic terrorists."

=== 2023 ===
CPAC returned to National Harbor, Maryland for their 2023 conference. Major speakers at the winter event included Donald Trump, Steve Bannon, U.S. House members Marjorie Taylor Greene, Matt Gaetz and Lauren Boebert, presidential candidate Nikki Haley, and Donald Trump Jr. Attendance was thinner than at previous conferences, with the main ballroom often half-full during speeches, though Trump drew a capacity crowd. He said he would not withdraw from the 2024 presidential race if he was indicted as a result of federal and state investigations underway. CNN fact checker Daniel Dale found that Trump "made some of his most thoroughly dishonest speeches" at the conference. Trump said, in part:

In 2016, I declared: I am your voice. Today, I add: I am your warrior. I am your justice. And for those who have been wronged and betrayed: I am your retribution.

Also during the conference political commentator Michael Knowles called for the elimination of "transgenderism," arguing that those who identify as transgender are "laboring a delusion, and we need to correct that delusion." Knowles further stated that "there can be no middle way in dealing with transgenderism," and that "for the good of society, and especially for the good of the poor people who have fallen prey to this confusion, transgenderism must be eradicated from public life entirely." Knowles' comments were criticized by several political media figures, including civil rights attorney Alejandra Caraballo, describing them as genocidal. Knowles demanded that The Daily Beast retract a headline stating that he was calling for the eradication of the "transgender community".

Presidential candidate Vivek Ramaswamy later alleged that a political consultant with ties to CPAC had offered to rig the straw poll in his favor in exchange for a fee exceeding $100,000, which Ramaswamy refused.

Longtime CPAC board member and vice-chair Charlie Gerow resigned in August 2023, calling for investigations of Matt Schlapp and the organization's financial practices. He said, "The situation at CPAC has become such that I felt compelled to resign." Four other longtime board members resigned earlier in the year, with one citing concerns over CPAC's financial reports. In December 2023, CPAC was accused of covering up sexual assault allegations against Schlapp in a lawsuit against him.

=== 2024 ===
CPAC returned to National Harbor, Maryland, for their February 21–24, 2024 conference. Speakers included Donald Trump, Vivek Ramaswamy, Ben Carson, Steve Bannon, Nigel Farage, Liz Truss, Javier Milei, Nayib Bukele, Santiago Abascal, deposed Catholic bishop Joseph Strickland, as well as Senators and Members of Congress. Politico noted that CPAC had been diminished due to the previous year's scandals involving Matt Schlapp and belief that the conference had "come to be seen as a mere adjunct of Trumpism".

During an event at CPAC on February 23, alt-right commentator Jack Posobiec made a speech that was widely covered in the media, in which he stated, "Welcome to the end of democracy – we're here to overthrow it completely. We didn't get all the way there on January 6th, but we will endeavor to get rid of it and replace it with this right here" holding his clenched fist in the air. "Because all glory is not to government — all glory to God." The event notably featured several neo-Nazis who were able to secure official CPAC badges to walk the show floor and were not ejected unlike previous years.

In addition to the annual presidential straw poll, a poll was also taken on who should be presumptive nominee Trump's vice president. Kristi Noem and Vivek Ramaswamy tied at 15%, followed by Tulsi Gabbard at 9%, and Elise Stefanik and Tim Scott at 8%.

Opposition to Donald Trump among some conservatives led to a rival conference held by the group Principles First.

=== 2025 ===
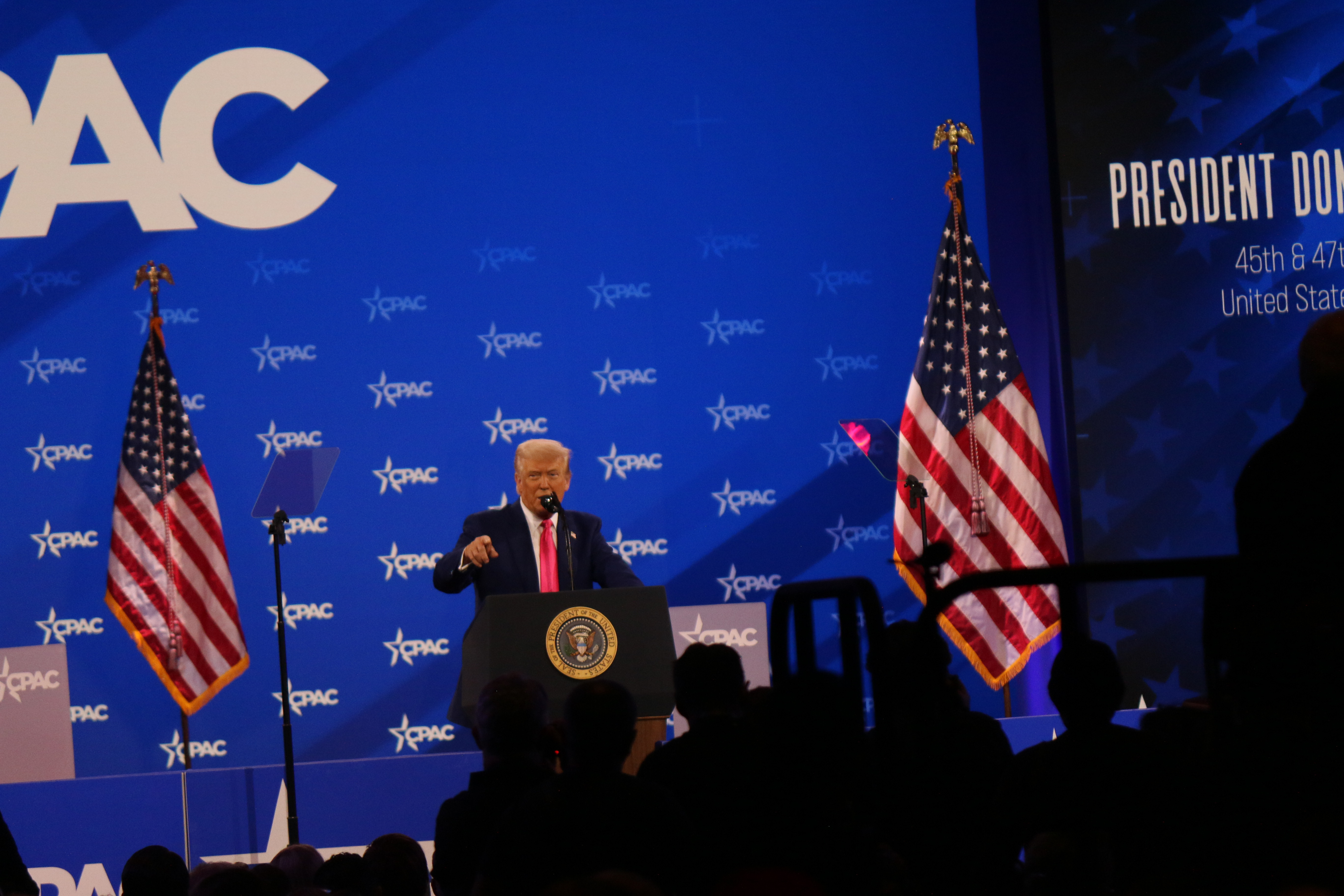
Trump at the 2025 CPAC

Speakers of the 2025 conference included Donald Trump, JD Vance, Liz Truss and Elon Musk. Argentine President Javier Milei gave Musk a chainsaw which Musk called the "chainsaw for bureaucracy". Steve Bannon spoke, closing his pro-Trump remarks with what appeared to some as a Nazi salute. The incident came one month after Elon Musk made a similar salute during a Trump inaugural appearance. The following day, Mexican actor Eduardo Verástegui made a similar salute after saying, "My heart goes out to all of you" and touching his chest, in a manner similar to the Musk incident.

President of the French populist right-wing party National Rally (RN), Jordan Bardella canceled his speech to the conference (CPAC) after the Bannon incident. Slovak Prime Minister Robert Fico delivered an enthusiastic endorsement of Donald Trump.

At CPAC 2025, conservative groups, such as the Third Term Project, supported Tennessee representative Andy Ogles proposed resolution to amend the Twenty-Second Amendment, allowing for presidents who have served two non-consecutive terms to seek a third term and promoted the idea of Trump running for an as-yet unconstitutional third term.

=== 2026 ===
The 2026 conference was held from March 25 to 28 at the Gaylord Texan Resort in Grapevine, Texas. For the first time in a decade, President Trump did not attend the conference, although the event remained heavily focused on support for Trump and his administration. Speakers and participants included Greg Abbott, Robert F. Kennedy Jr., Scott Turner, Brooke Rollins, Ted Cruz, Ken Paxton, Matt Gaetz, Tom Homan, Steve Bannon, Franklin Graham, and former Polish prime minister Mateusz Morawiecki. Iranian opposition figure Reza Pahlavi was also a speaker amid discussion of regime change in Iran.

The conference took place during the Trump administration's military conflict with Iran, and many speakers expressed support for U.S. strikes and for Trump's foreign policy, though divisions within the MAGA movement over the conflict were also evident. Reuters described the event as demonstrating strong Republican alignment behind Trump despite declining national polling support for the conflict.

During one main-stage appearance, CPAC chairman Matt Schlapp asked attendees whether they wanted to see "impeachment hearings," prompting cheers from the audience before Schlapp clarified that this was "the wrong answer," an exchange that received widespread online attention.

=== 2027 ===
The 2027 conference is scheduled to be held from April 14 to 17 at the Gaylord Palms Resort & Convention Center in Kissimmee, Florida.

== Annual straw poll ==
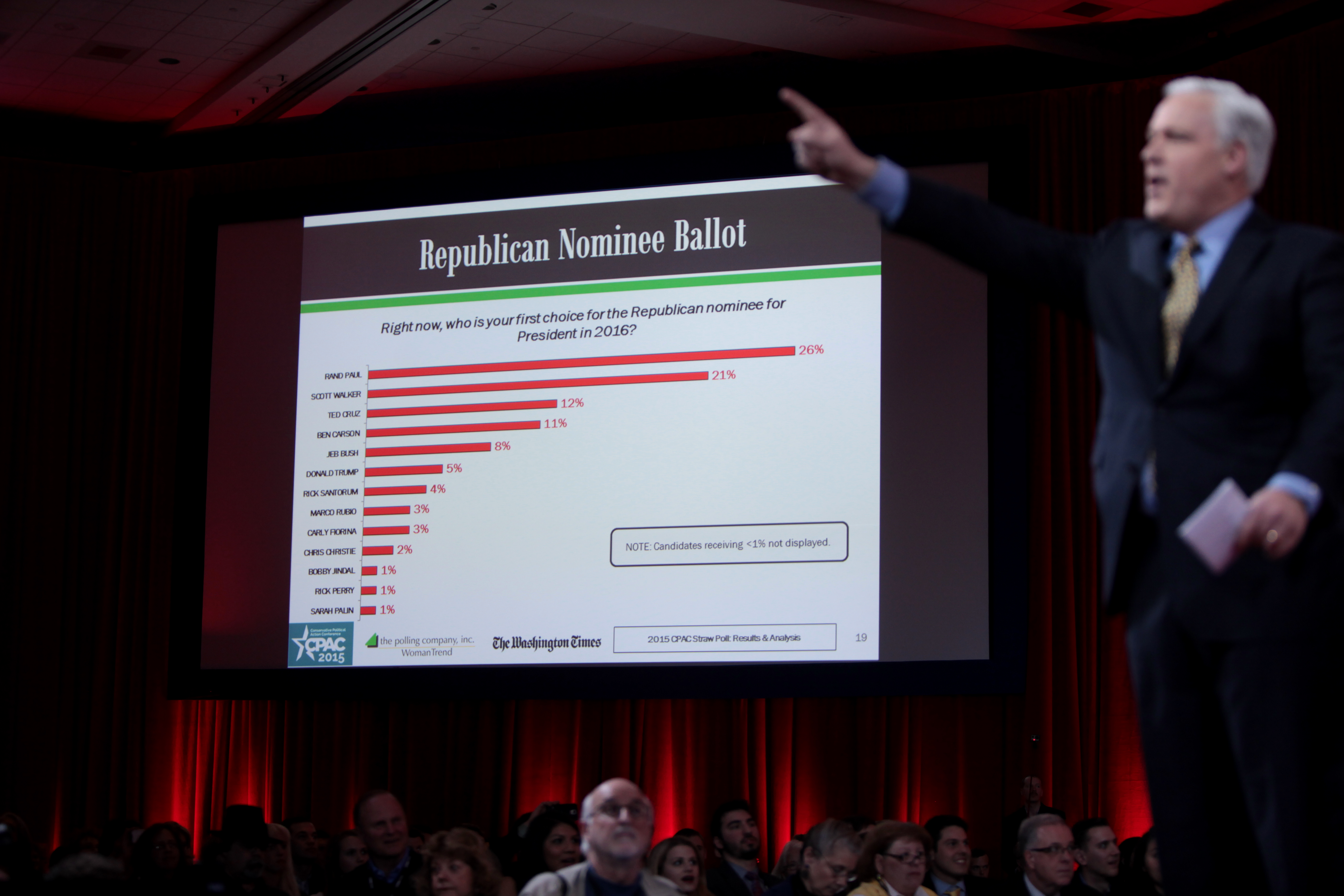
Straw poll results at the 2015 CPAC, showing Rand Paul as the apparent winner

The annual CPAC straw poll vote traditionally serves as a barometer for the feelings of the conservative movement. During the conference, attendees are encouraged to fill out a survey that asks questions on a variety of issues. The questions regarding the most popular possible presidential candidates are the most widely reported. One component of CPAC is evaluating conservative candidates for president, and the straw poll serves generally to quantify conservative opinion.

Year	Straw poll winner	% of votes	Second place	% of votes	Eventual Republican nominee
1974–75	Polling irregular?				Gerald Ford (1976)
1976	Ronald Reagan	77.2	George Wallace	14.6	Gerald Ford (1976)
1977–79	Polling irregular?				Ronald Reagan (1980)
1980	Ronald Reagan	n/a	n/a	n/a	Ronald Reagan (1980)
1981–83	Not held (Ronald Reagan's nomination presumptive)				Ronald Reagan (1984)
1984	Ronald Reagan	n/a	n/a	n/a	Ronald Reagan (1984)
1985	Not held				George H. W. Bush (1988)
1986	Jack Kemp	n/a	George H. W. Bush	n/a	George H. W. Bush (1988)
1987	Jack Kemp	68	Pat Buchanan	9	George H. W. Bush (1988)
1988	Not held				George H. W. Bush (1988)
1989–91	Not held (George H. W. Bush's nomination presumptive)				George H. W. Bush (1992)
1992	Pat Buchanan	?	?	?	George H. W. Bush (1992)
1993	Jack Kemp	n/a	n/a	n/a	Bob Dole (1996)
1994	Not held				Bob Dole (1996)
1995	Phil Gramm	40	Bob Dole	12	Bob Dole (1996)
1996	Bob Dole	26	Pat Buchanan	24	Bob Dole (1996)
1997	Not held				George W. Bush (2000)
1998	Steve Forbes	23	George W. Bush	10	George W. Bush (2000)
1999	Gary Bauer	28	George W. Bush	24	George W. Bush (2000)
2000	George W. Bush	42	Alan Keyes	23	George W. Bush (2000)
2001–04	Not held (George W. Bush's nomination presumptive)				George W. Bush (2004)
2005	Rudy Giuliani	19	Condoleezza Rice	18	John McCain (2008)
2006	George Allen	22	John McCain	20	John McCain (2008)
2007	Mitt Romney	21	Rudy Giuliani	17	John McCain (2008)
2008	Mitt Romney	35	John McCain	34	John McCain (2008)
2009	Mitt Romney	20	Bobby Jindal	14	Mitt Romney (2012)
2010	Ron Paul	31	Mitt Romney	22	Mitt Romney (2012)
2011	Ron Paul	30	Mitt Romney	23	Mitt Romney (2012)
2012	Mitt Romney	38	Rick Santorum	31	Mitt Romney (2012)
2013	Rand Paul	25	Marco Rubio	23	Donald Trump (2016)
2014	Rand Paul	31	Ted Cruz	11	Donald Trump (2016)
2015	Rand Paul	26	Scott Walker	21	Donald Trump (2016)
2016	Ted Cruz	40	Marco Rubio	30	Donald Trump (2016)
2017–18	Not held (Donald Trump's nomination presumptive)				Donald Trump (2020)
2019	Donald Trump	82	Mitt Romney	6	Donald Trump (2020)
2020	Not held (Donald Trump's nomination presumptive)				Donald Trump (2020)
2021 (1)	Donald Trump	55	Ron DeSantis	21	Donald Trump (2024)
2021 (2)	Donald Trump	70	Ron DeSantis	21	Donald Trump (2024)
2022 (1)	Donald Trump	59	Ron DeSantis	28	Donald Trump (2024)
2022 (2)	Donald Trump	69	Ron DeSantis	24	Donald Trump (2024)
2023	Donald Trump	62	Ron DeSantis	20	Donald Trump (2024)
2024	Donald Trump	94	Nikki Haley	5	Donald Trump (2024)
2025	JD Vance	61	Steve Bannon	12	TBD (2028)
2026	JD Vance	53	Marco Rubio	35	TBD (2028)

In total, current U.S. President Donald Trump holds the record for the most wins in CPAC straw polls with seven (as of February 2024). Mitt Romney follows with four, and Ronald Reagan, Jack Kemp, and Rand Paul follow with three wins each, followed by Ron Paul and JD Vance with two wins. Of these five, the Pauls are the only two to win more than one straw poll, yet never appear on a Republican presidential ticket in any election, although Ron Paul did receive one Electoral College vote in 2016.

Despite his former popularity, Romney was not invited from CPAC in 2020 because of his vote to hear additional witnesses in the first impeachment trial of Donald Trump and was also not invited to the 2021 CPAC after he voted to convict Trump on one count in his second impeachment trial. CPAC's chairman said he could not ensure Romney's "physical safety" at the 2020 CPAC conference.

Florida Governor Ron DeSantis has had more second-place finishes in the CPAC straw poll than anyone else, being the runner-up five consecutive times from 2021 to 2023. Mitt Romney has the second-highest number of second-place finishes, with three, followed by Pat Buchanan, George W. Bush, John McCain, and Marco Rubio, all with two each.

== Foreign CPACs ==
=== Argentina ===
The first CPAC in Argentina took place on December 4, 2024, in the city of Buenos Aires. Speakers included Argentinian President Javier Milei, Lara Trump, Kari Lake, Santiago Abascal, Agustín Laje, Patricia Bullrich, Ben Shapiro, Eduardo Verástegui, Rafael López Aliaga, Ricardo Salinas Pliego, Luis Caputo and Eduardo Bolsonaro, with video messages by: Steve Bannon, Jair Bolsonaro and Maria Corina Machado.

=== Australia ===
Australia's first CPAC was held in August 2019 by Andrew Cooper, founding president of conservative think-tank LibertyWorks. Guest speakers included former prime minister Tony Abbott, Brexit campaign leader Nigel Farage, former Breitbart News editor-in-chief Raheem Kassam, and NSW One Nation leader Mark Latham. Liberal Senator Amanda Stoker and Craig Kelly MP were at the event. There were calls for Kassam to be banned from coming into the country before the event.

The second conference was held in Sydney November 2020. Canadian alt-right YouTuber Lauren Southern was initially scheduled to appear, but her invitation was rescinded by the organizers.

The 2022 conference was held in Sydney on October 1. Attendees included Tony Abbott, Eric Abetz, Katherine Deves, Nigel Farage, Jacinta Price and Amanda Stoker.

The 2023 conference was held in Sydney in August 19–20. One prominent speaking point of the conference was in opposition to the proposed constitutional amendment to create an Indigenous Voice to Parliament. Tony Abbott, Warren Mundine, and Jacinta Nampijinpa Price were among the speakers at the conference.

The 2025 conference was held in Brisbane September 2025. Attendees included Tony Abbott, One Nation leader Pauline Hanson, Matt Canavan, Alex Antic, Jacinta Nampijinpa Price and former British prime minister Liz Truss.

The 2026 conference was held in Brisbane October 2026. Attendees included One Nation leader Pauline Hanson, Leader Angus Taylor and Nationals leader Matt Canavan. It was the first time a sitting Coalition/Liberal leader has addressed CPAC Australia.

=== Brazil ===
The first CPAC in Brazil took place on October 11–12, 2019, in the city of São Paulo, attended by leading American conservatives including ACU chairman Matt Schlapp and his wife Mercedes Schlapp, Utah senator Mike Lee, Fox News specialist Walid Phares, as well as Brazilian figures including President Jair Bolsonaro's son Eduardo Bolsonaro, the Minister of Foreign Affairs Ernesto Araújo, and the Prince Imperial of Brazil Bertrand Maria José de Orléans e Bragança and others.

The ACU Foundation announced that the event would take place annually in Brazil from 2019.

In September 2021, Jason Miller, a former senior adviser to Donald Trump, and other American right-wing media personalities in his traveling party, were detained and questioned for three hours at Brasília International Airport following participation in the 2021 CPAC Brazil Conference. The investigation was part of an inquiry by Brazilian Supreme Court Justice Alexandre de Moraes into misinformation allegedly perpetuated by the administration of President Jair Bolsonaro. Miller had praised Bolsonaro's supporters as "proud patriots" and claimed they had been deplatformed and shadow banned by Brazilian authorities. Miller continued to advise Jair Bolsonaro after his October 2022 election defeat, meeting with the president's son, Eduardo Bolsonaro, in November 2022, as protests and election challenges continued.

The 2024 CPAC Brazil featured Jair Bolsonaro, Eduardo Bolsonaro, Argentinian President Javier Milei, Chilean Republican Party leader José Antonio Kast and Salvadoran Justice and Public Security Minister Gustavo Villatoro.

=== Hungary ===
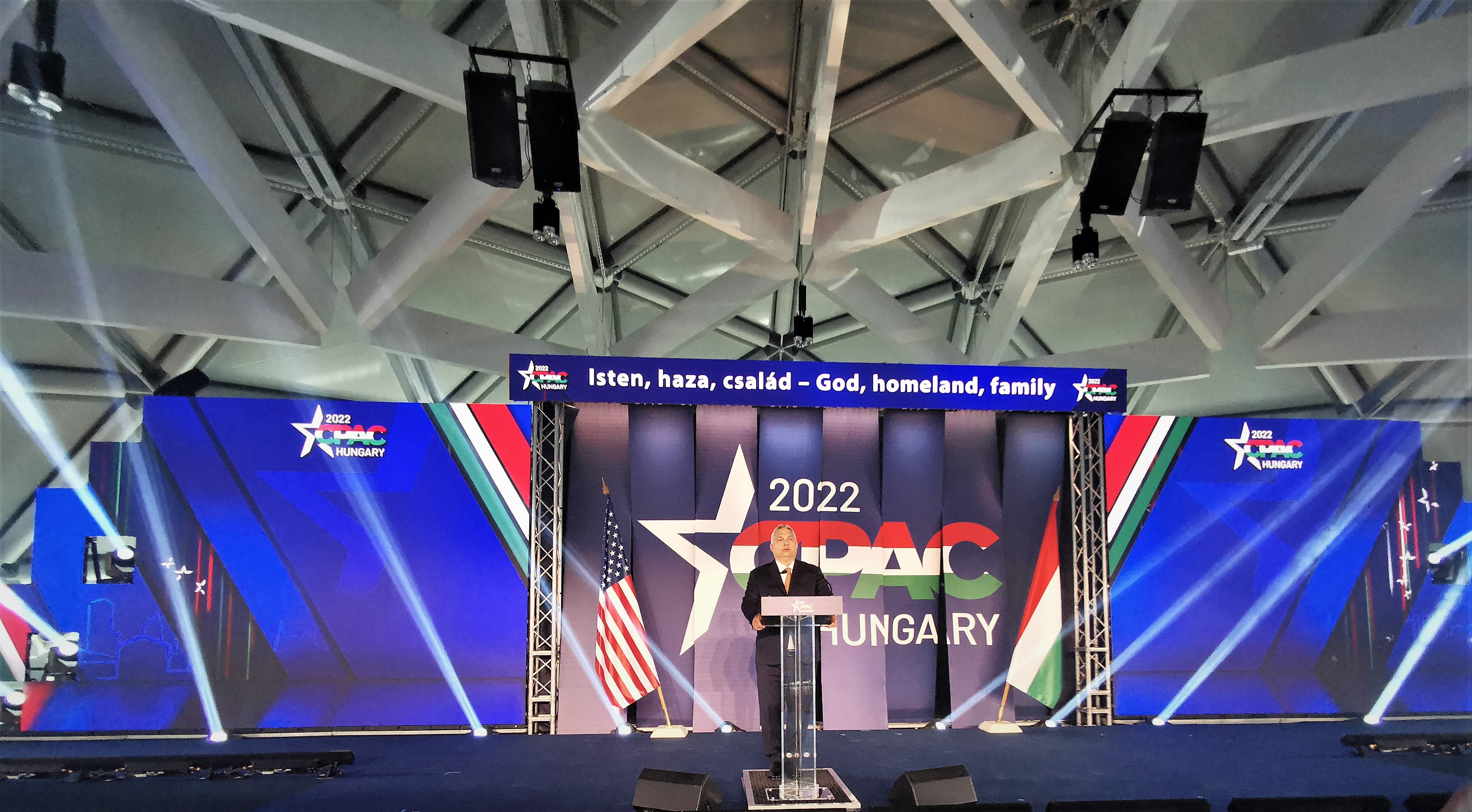
Viktor Orbán speaking at CPAC Hungary

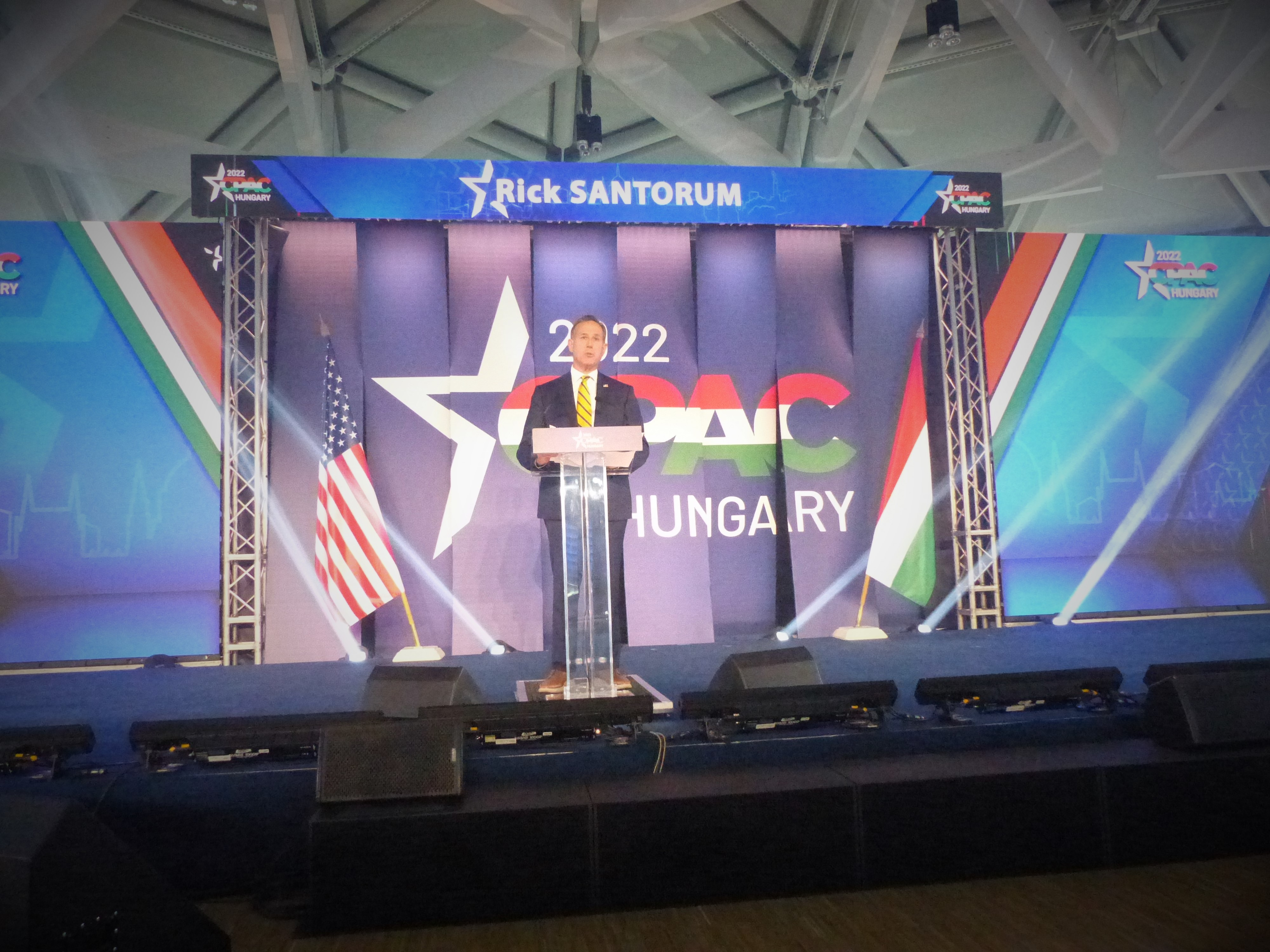
Rick Santorum speaking at CPAC Hungary 2022

In May 2022, CPAC Hungary, was held in Budapest, Hungary. Speakers included Hungary's Prime Minister Viktor Orbán; Spain's Vox party leader Santiago Abascal; Eduardo Bolsonaro; right-wing US commentator Candace Owens; Ernst Roets, the Deputy CEO of AfriForum; and former US White House chief of staff Mark Meadows, as well as far-right US conspiracy theorist Jack Posobiec and Hungarian journalist Zsolt Bayer.

CPAC 2024 in Hungary attracted attention by refusing registration to journalists from various national media, using "CPAC is a no woke zone" as an argument. The event was attended by 3000 participants, among them 500 from abroad, from 6 continents: two prime ministers in office, Irakli Kobakhidze (Georgia) and Viktor Orbán (Hungary); three former Prime Ministers (Tony Abbott, Mateusz Morawiecki, and Janez Janša); seven ministers in office (5 Hungarians and 2 Israelis); ten presidents of political parties (amongst them: Santiago Abascal, Geert Wilders, and Tom Van Grieken); three American congressmen (Andy Harris, Paul Gosar, and Keith Self); and seven high ranking Polish political leaders. Participants of the conference were greeted with video messages by Donald Trump, the 45th president of the United States of America, Vivek Ramaswamy, former candidate for the Republican nomination for President of the United States, and André Ventura, founder of the Portuguese party Chega!.

2025 CPAC Hungary billed itself as the largest gathering of patriots ever. Miklós Szánthó said: "We are facing a global conspiracy, and the age of patriots has arrived—when we must provide an anti-globalist response to globalist aspirations."

In March 2026, Israeli Prime Minister Benjamin Netanyahu's son, Yair, delivered a speech at CPAC Hungary 2026 in which he praised Orbán's immigration and security policies.

In April 2026, following Orbán's loss in the 2026 Hungarian parliamentary election, it emerged that he had diverted Hungarian taxpayer funds toward financing CPAC. The incoming prime minister Péter Magyar described the funding as a criminal offence and said that there would be an investigation by the National Office for the Recovery and Protection of Public Assets.

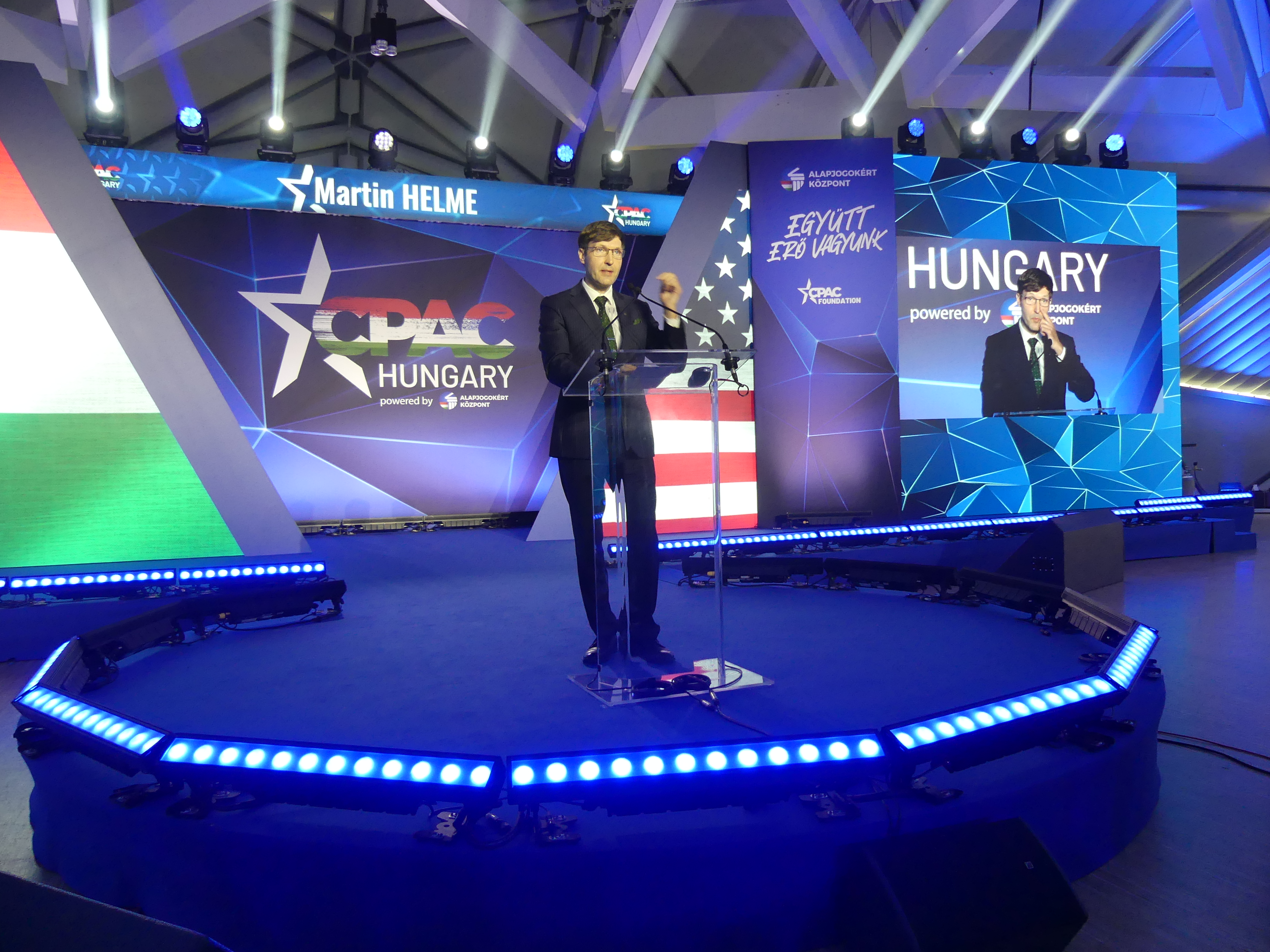
Martin Helme – CPAC Hungary 2023

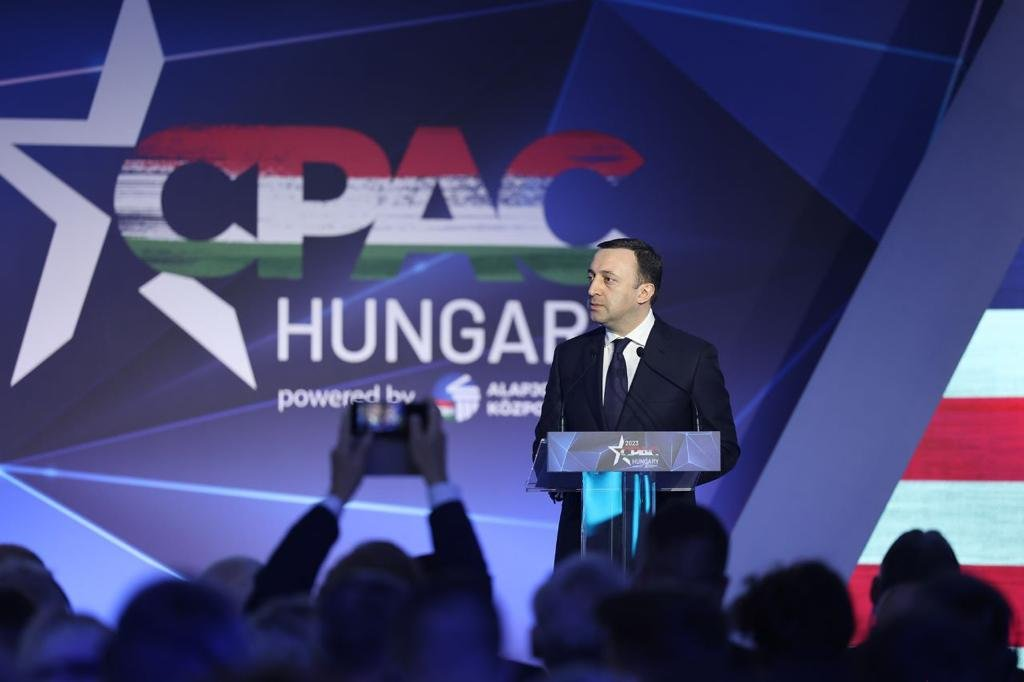
Irakli Garibashvili on CPAC Hungary, May 2023

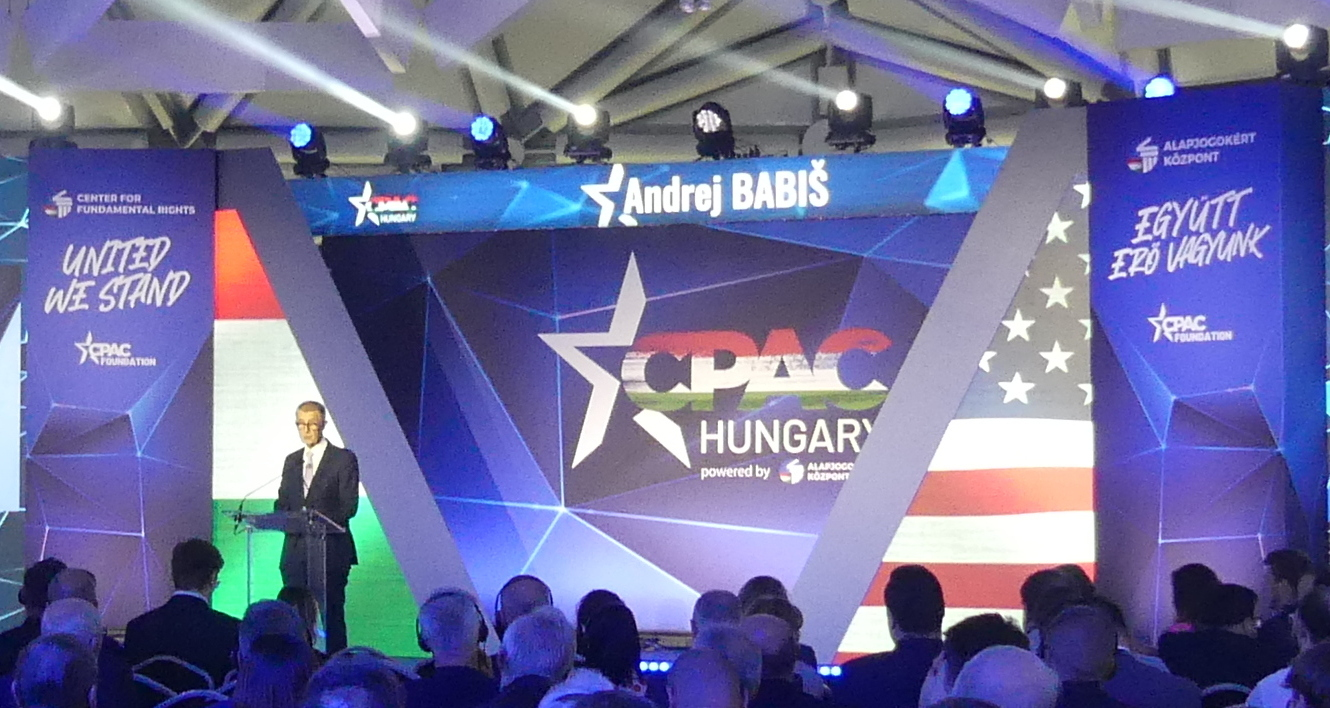
ANO leader, Andrej Babiš, speaking at the 2023 CPAC Hungary

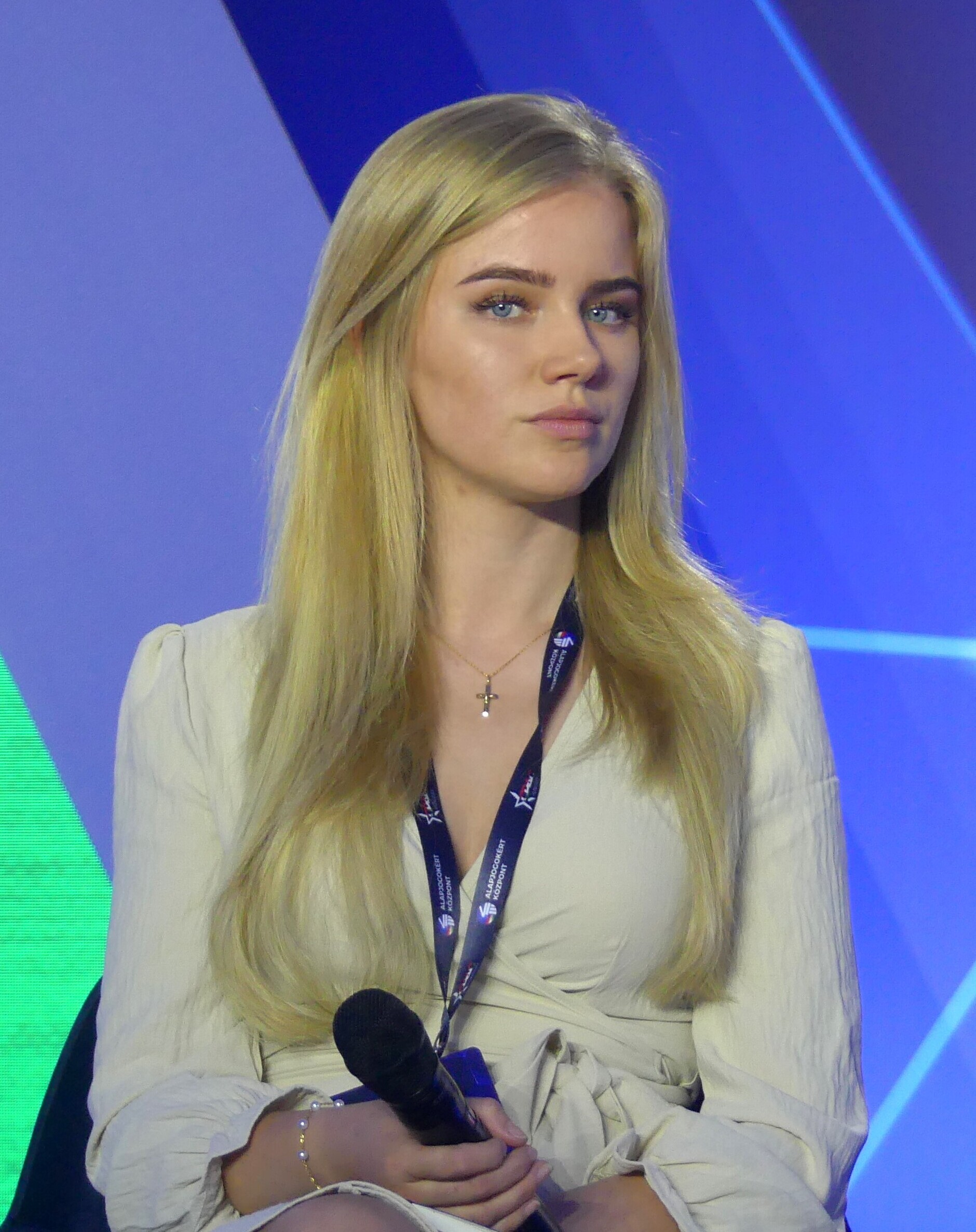
Eva Vlaardingerbroek speaking at CPAC Hungary 2023

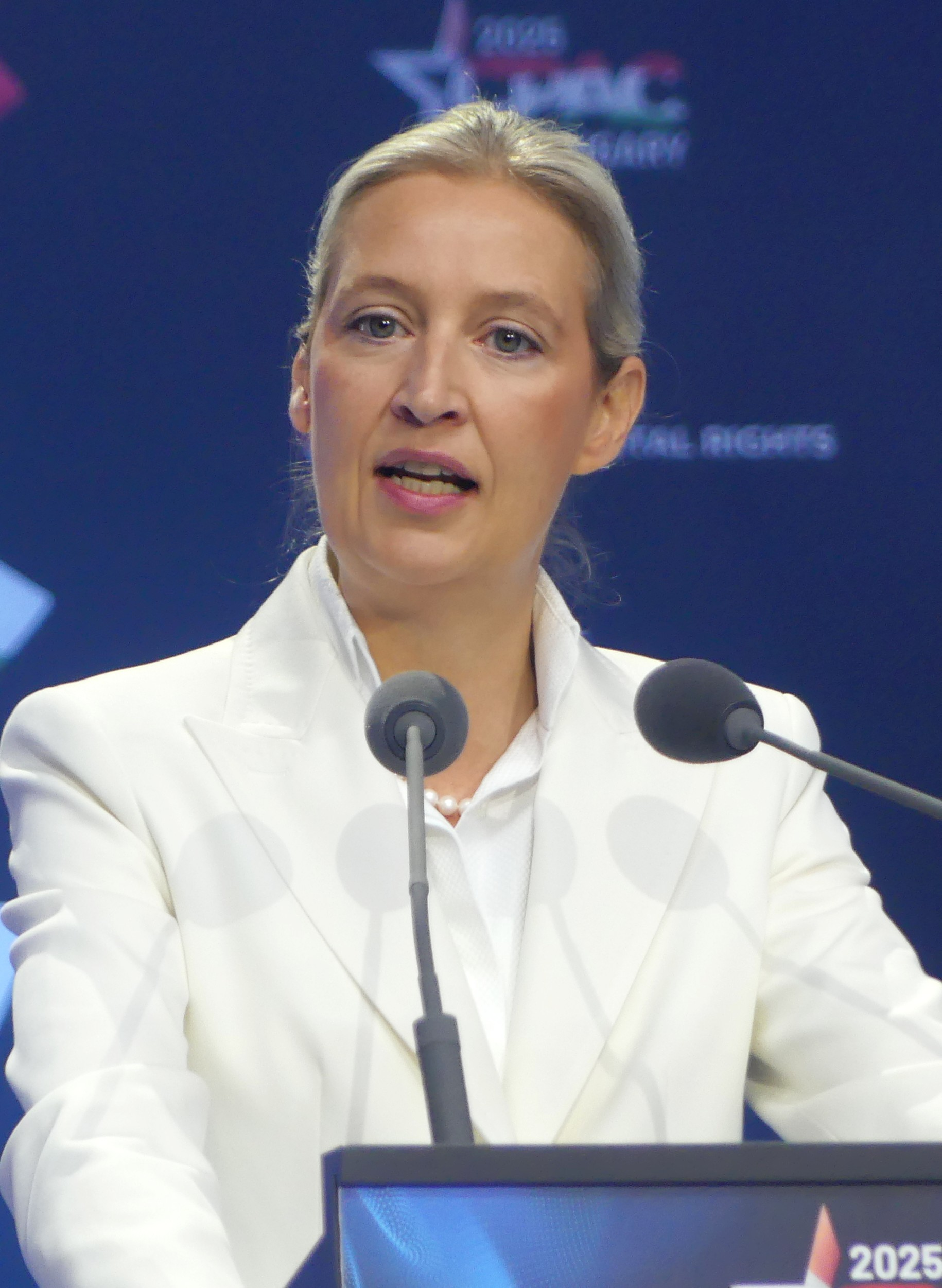
Alice Weidel speaking at CPAC Hungary 2025

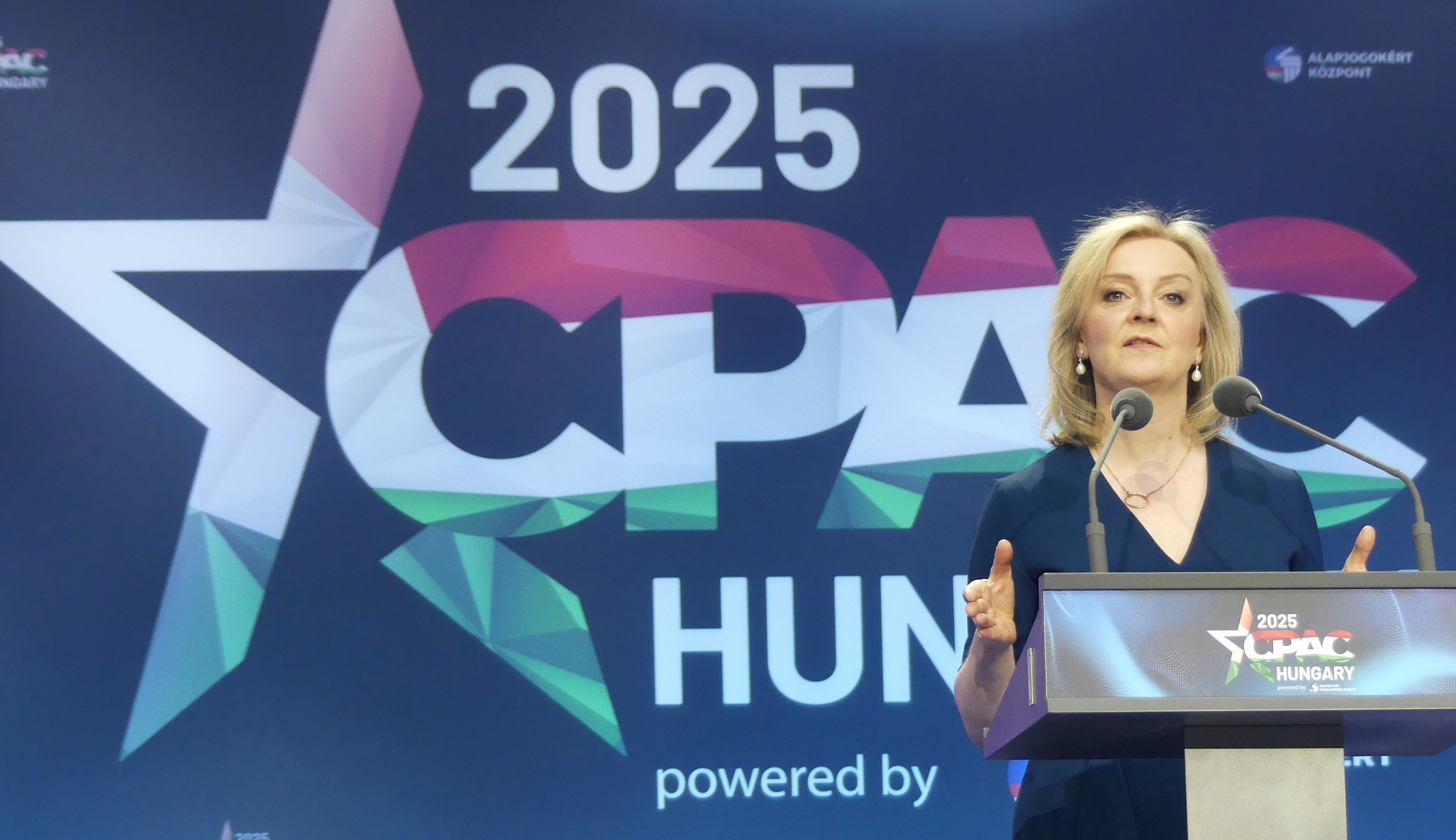
Liz Truss speaking at CPAC Hungary 2025

=== Japan ===
The first international CPAC was hosted in Tokyo on December 16–17, 2017 by the Japanese Conservative Union (JCU) in conjunction with the American Conservative Union (ACU). JCU and ACU have continued to co-host J-CPACs every year since. Participants have included notable lawmakers and conservatives from the U.S., Japan, and around the world. They include ACU chairman Matt Schlapp and executive director Dan Schneider, White House chief of staff Mick Mulvaney, U.S. Representatives Bruce Westerman, and Paul Gosar, Fmr. METI Minister Akira Amari, Fmr. Defense Minister Gen Nakatani, Fmr. Defense Minister Tomomi Inada, Fmr. Taiwanese Finance Minister and WTO ambassador Ching-Chang Wen, journalist Sara Carter, then-SEC commissioner Michael Piwowar, Asia expert and commentator Gordon G. Chang, to name just a few. Hong Kong localist activist Andy Chan Ho-tin attended Japanese CPAC 2019 by video after he was arrested in Hong Kong on his way to Tokyo to make a live appearance.

=== Mexico ===
The first CPAC in Mexico (CPAC México) took place on November 18–19, 2022 at a Westin hotel in Santa Fe, Mexico City. Speakers included former Trump White House advisor Steve Bannon, American anti-abortion activist Abby Johnson, Eduardo Bolsonaro, Argentinian presidential candidate Javier Milei, former Chilean presidential candidate José Antonio Kast, and Juan Iván Peña Neder, the President of the Mexican Republicans. It was organized by Mexican anti-abortion activist Eduardo Verástegui. At the start of the conference, a group of communist protesters wearing Che Guevara shirts and waving red hammer and sickle flags showed up at the hotel; Matt Schlapp dubbed the protest "CPAC Derangement Syndrome".

=== Poland ===
On May 27, 2025, the first CPAC meeting in Poland took place close to Rzeszów city. The list of speakers included politicians from Law and Justice and Confederation Liberty and Independence, including then president of Poland Andrzej Duda and then candidate for presidency Karol Nawrocki, who was later elected to office. Speakers from the United States included Kristi Noem.

=== South Korea ===
The first CPAC in South Korea (KCPAC) took place between October 3, 2019, in the city of Seoul. They include ACU chairman Matt Schlapp and executive director Dan Schneider, Fmr. acting United States Attorney General Matthew Whitaker, Fmr. Deputy National Security Advisor of the United States K. T. McFarland, Asia expert and commentator Gordon G. Chang, Fox News host Jeanine Pirro, Founder of the New Institute Andrew Crilly, Fox News Contributor Sara A. Carter, Professor of law at Handong International Law School Eric Enlow, Professor emeritus at Yonsei University Kim Dong-gil, Fmr. public security prosecutor Koh Young-ju, Co-chairperson KCPAC Annie M. H. Chan, Fmr. Prime minister of South Korea Hwang Kyo-ahn, Liberty Korea Party members of the National Assembly Kim Jin-tae and Chun Hee-kyung and Min Kyung-wook, Director of the International Strategic Research Institute Kim Jung-min, Director of Korea Institute for Crisis Management Analysis Huh Nam-sung, Fmr. Director of Korea Institute for National Unification Kim Tae-woo, Founder and former Chief of Pennmike Chung Kyu-jae, Lawyer Chae Myung-sung, Leader of Dawn of Liberty Party Park Kyul, Leader of Truth Forum Kim Eun-koo. In Korea, Min Kyung-wook and Ryu Chulwoong presented at CPAC2021 in the United States.

=== United Kingdom ===
In July 2026, the first CPAC in the United Kingdom took place in London.
