= Matt Schlapp =

American political figure (born 1967)

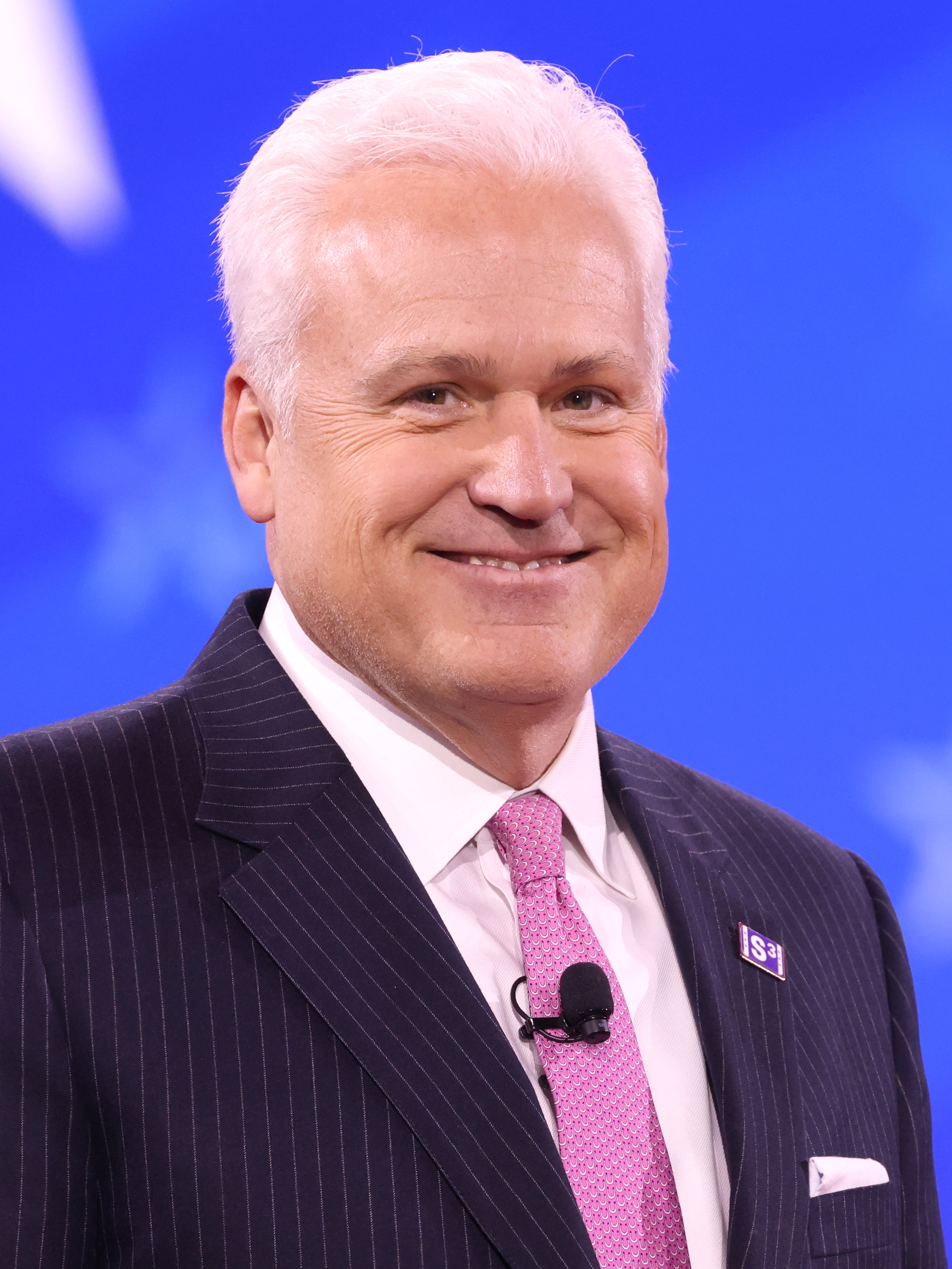
- Schlapp in 2025

White House Director of Political Affairs
- In office May 23, 2003 – February 2005
- President: George W. Bush
- Preceded by: Ken Mehlman
- Succeeded by: Sara Taylor

Personal details
- Born: Matthew Aaron Schlapp; December 18, 1967 (age 58) Wichita, Kansas, U.S.
- Party: Republican
- Spouse: Mercedes Schlapp (m. 2002)
- Children: 5
- Education: University of Notre Dame (BA); Wichita State University (MPA)

Matthew Aaron Schlapp (born December 18, 1967) is an American political activist and lobbyist who is chairman of the American Conservative Union. He leads the lobbying firm Cove Strategies, which had strong ties to the Donald Trump administration. He is a former Fox News political contributor.

Schlapp was President George W. Bush's deputy assistant and political director during Bush's first term. He is married to Mercedes Schlapp, who was President Donald Trump's Director of Strategic Communications.

== Early life and education ==
Raised in Wichita, Kansas, Matt Schlapp is the son of Susan Schlapp, a former city councilwoman who, after eight years of service on the Wichita City Council (2003-2011), became the senior constituent liaison for the Kansas Department of Commerce under Governor Sam Brownback.

Schlapp's early schooling began at St. Thomas Aquinas Catholic School in Wichita, and in 1986, he graduated from Kapaun Mt. Carmel Catholic High School. He earned a Bachelor's degree from the University of Notre Dame, and went on to earn a Master's degree in public policy from Wichita State University.

== Political career ==
=== George W. Bush ===
Schlapp began his political career in 1994 and worked five years as a press secretary, campaign manager, and chief of staff for Representative Todd Tiahrt (R-KS). He also worked on the 2000 political campaign of George W. Bush, serving as a regional political director with oversight of Missouri, Arkansas, Iowa, Wisconsin, Minnesota, Kansas, and Oklahoma.

During Bush's 2000 presidential campaign, Schlapp helped organize and was the on-site leader of the protest which became known as the Brooks Brothers riot. The riot was a demonstration at a meeting of election canvassers in Miami-Dade County, Florida, on November 22, 2000, during a recount of votes made during the 2000 United States presidential election, with the goal of shutting down the recount. After demonstrations and acts of violence, local officials shut down the recount early.

During the George W. Bush administration, Schlapp served as political director, and advised Bush, Vice President Dick Cheney, members of Bush's cabinet, and senior White House staff, and had extensive contact with members of Congress and federal agencies.

=== American Conservative Union and the 2020 election ===
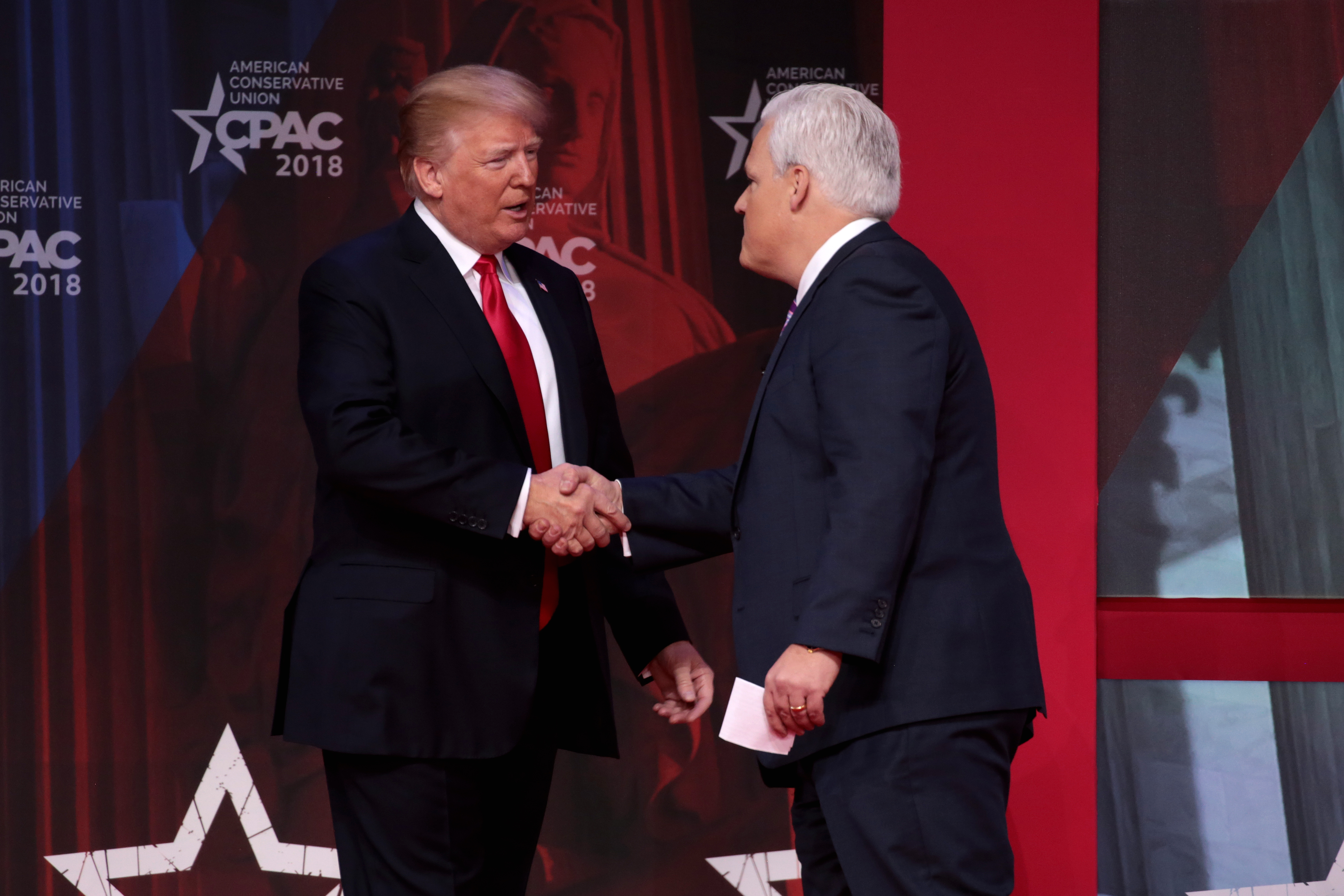
Schlapp with US president Donald Trump, February 2018

On June 19, 2014, Schlapp was unanimously elected chairman of the American Conservative Union.

Abbott Labs came under criticism for using Cove Strategies and Schlapp as a lobbyist despite Abbott's professed commitment to social justice and consequently cut its ties with Schlapp. Comcast followed suit.

While ballots were being counted during the 2020 election, Schlapp made false claims of voter fraud. He claimed that 9,000 votes were improperly cast in Nevada; PolitiFact rated his claim with a "Pants On Fire" rating.

In the final days of the Trump administration, Schlapp was also lobbying for a pardon for Parker H. "Pete" Petit, a major Republican donor, who was the Georgia finance chairman of Donald Trump's 2016 presidential campaign and was convicted of securities fraud in November 2020. Schlapp charged Parker $750,000 for his lobbying assistance during the period of December 17–31, 2020. Schlapp's lobbying firm Cove Strategies earned more than $2.3 million in 2020.

Schlapp signed the Madrid Charter, a document drafted by the conservative Spanish political party Vox that describes left-wing groups as enemies of Ibero-America involved in a "criminal project" that are "under the umbrella of the Cuban regime".

Matt Schlapp is the ninth chairman of the American Conservative Union.

=== Conservative Political Action Committee ===
Schlapp chaired the Conservative Political Action Committee (CPAC), normally an unpaid position. After his wife left the White House and joined the unsuccessful Trump reelection campaign, his lobbying fees sharply declined and his CPAC compensation became $600,000 annually. His wife was also paid, receiving $175,000 from CPAC.

== Sexual assault allegations ==
In January 2023, a campaign staffer for Herschel Walker's U.S. Senate campaign alleged that Schlapp groped him in October 2022 after Schlapp had been drinking. Schlapp denied the allegation. The alleged victim filed claims against Schlapp for battery and defamation. The plaintiff provided records of contemporary phone calls and texts regarding the claims.

In August 2023, The Daily Beast reported that Schlapp had attempted to settle the lawsuit against him for a six-figure sum. Earlier that month, two additional allegations of sexual assault by Schlapp against male staffers were reported by The Washington Post. That December, CPAC was accused in the lawsuit of covering up the additional allegations.

In March 2024, a Schlapp spokesman announced that the lawsuit had been dropped, quoting a statement from the plaintiff saying "The claims made in my lawsuits were the result of a complete misunderstanding, and I regret that the lawsuit caused pain to the Schlapp family" and "Neither the Schlapps nor the ACU paid me anything to dismiss my claims against them." The accuser had been paid a settlement of $480,000 by the ACU's insurance company and was thereby consequently restrained from commenting.

In February 2025, Schlapp was accused of sexually assaulting a man at a bar in Sperryville, Virginia. A sheriff's report indicated that an intoxicated Schlapp made multiple bar patrons uncomfortable before allegedly groping a man's genitals and being expelled from the bar. "Schlapp allegedly followed around and stood close to multiple groups of men in a Virginia bar, making them uncomfortable. After being confronted by some of those men, Schlapp failed to cease his assaultive behavior, and grazed his body against other men while walking past, according to the report."

== Personal life ==
Schlapp married Mercedes Schlapp, whom he met while they both worked at the White House, where she was the director of specialty media. They co-founded Cove Strategies, a communications and political consulting firm based in Alexandria, Virginia.

From September 2017 to July 2019, she served as Director of Strategic Communications in the Trump administration. Starting in July 2019, she worked on Trump's 2020 re-election campaign. The couple have five daughters.

Schlapp is a supporter of Israel.

Political offices
Preceded by Ken Mehlman	White House Director of Political Affairs; 2003–2005	Succeeded by Sara Taylor
