= Sara Fagen =

American entrepreneur and presidential aide

White House Director of Political Affairs
- In office February 2005 – May 31, 2007
- President: George W. Bush
- Preceded by: Matt Schlapp
- Succeeded by: Jonathan Felts

Personal details
- Born: Sara Marie Taylor; September 15, 1974 (age 52) Dubuque, Iowa, U.S.
- Party: Republican
- Education: Drake University (BS)

Sara Marie Taylor Fagen (born September 15, 1974) is a technology and data entrepreneur, and former staff member in the administration of President George W. Bush.

== Early life and family ==
Sara Marie Taylor was born on September 15, 1974, in Dubuque, Iowa, to Raymond J. Taylor, an Iowa state representative. She graduated from Wahlert High School, a private, co-educational, Roman Catholic school, in 1992. She then attended Drake University in Des Moines, Iowa. While in college, she was the National Co-Chairman of the College Republicans. She also took a year off, in 1995–1996, to work on Senator Phil Gramm's presidential campaign in Iowa.

After graduating from Drake in 1997 with a B.S. in Finance, Fagen worked for two years at the Tarrance Group, a northern Virginia polling firm headed by Ed Goeas.

She married Joel Fagen in 2010.

== White House career ==
In April 1999, Fagen began working for the presidential campaign of George Bush. Her initial position, through January 2000, was coalitions director for Bush's Iowa caucus campaign. She then did field work in the South Carolina, Virginia, Washington, and Illinois primaries, and finally served as executive director of the Michigan campaign. After Bush was elected, Fagen worked for the White House as an associate political director (Midwest) doing political and public affairs outreach.

Fagen became the deputy to Matthew Dowd, Chief Strategist for the Bush-Cheney 2004 re-election campaign. Sara served as a senior aide and White House Political Director for President George W. Bush, and playing a part in the 2004 Bush-Cheney re-election campaign. During the campaign, The Wall Street Journal called her a "data whiz," and said: "As a top strategist for the 2004 Bush-Cheney re-election efforts Fagen helped perfect political micro-targeting." She also served as a senior strategist helping to direct the President's message development, paid media strategy, and opinion research.

After Bush's 2004 re-election, Fagen returned to work in the White House, where she served as the director of the White House Office of Political Affairs and deputy assistant to President George W. Bush. She left for the private sector in May 2007.

=== Dismissal of U.S. Attorneys controversy ===
On June 13, 2007, the Senate and House judiciary committees issued a subpoena to Fagen, to produce documents and testify before the committee. A subpoena was also issued to Harriet E. Miers, former White House counsel and supreme court nominee. In response to the subpoenas, the White House said that its longstanding policy was that no past or present White House officials would be permitted to testify under oath before the panels, and that only private, non-legally-binding, non-transcribed interviews would be permitted.

The Democratic chairs of the House and Senate Judiciary Committees said that the White House terms were unacceptable.

A ranking member of the Senate Judiciary committee, Arlen Specter (R-PA) said that the White House had not responded to an April 11, 2007, inquiry by the committee, and he supported the issuance of the subpoena in light of the lack of response by the White House and Taylor. On July 9, 2007, White House counsel Fred Fielding, in letters to Senator Patrick Leahy (D-VT) and Representative John Conyers (D-MI) said President Bush is invoking executive privilege and not allowing Taylor to testify, but reiterated that Taylor was available for a private, off the record interview.

== Business career ==
In 2008, Fagen founded a media firm, BlueFront Strategies, as a strategic consulting and public affairs company to focus on issue advocacy and solutions for business. In mid-2009, Fagen co-founded, with public affairs veteran John Brady, the company Resonate Networks, an advertising firm that uses data on political leanings and attitudes to help companies and interest groups sell online ads.

Fagen became a partner at DDC Advocacy in 2011 after the company acquired Bluefront Strategies. Fagen also sits on the board of CentraForce. Fagen's commentary appears on CNBC, where she is regular contributor.

=== Deep Root Analytics ===
In 2013, Fagen and TargetPoint Consulting partners founded Deep Root Analytics, a media analytics company that helps clients use big data to make ad buying decisions. They aim to improve microtargeting by providing better web-enabled media targeting. In June 2017 cyber risk analyst Chris Vickery discovered Deep Root's data on an unsecure Amazon server, which exposed political data on more than 198 million American citizens. Sources of the data included American Crossroads, the Kantar Group and r/FatPeopleHate, among other subreddits.

Political offices
Preceded by Matt Schlapp	White House Director of Political Affairs; 2005–2007	Succeeded by Jonathan Felts
