= José A. Viana =

American government official (born 1969)

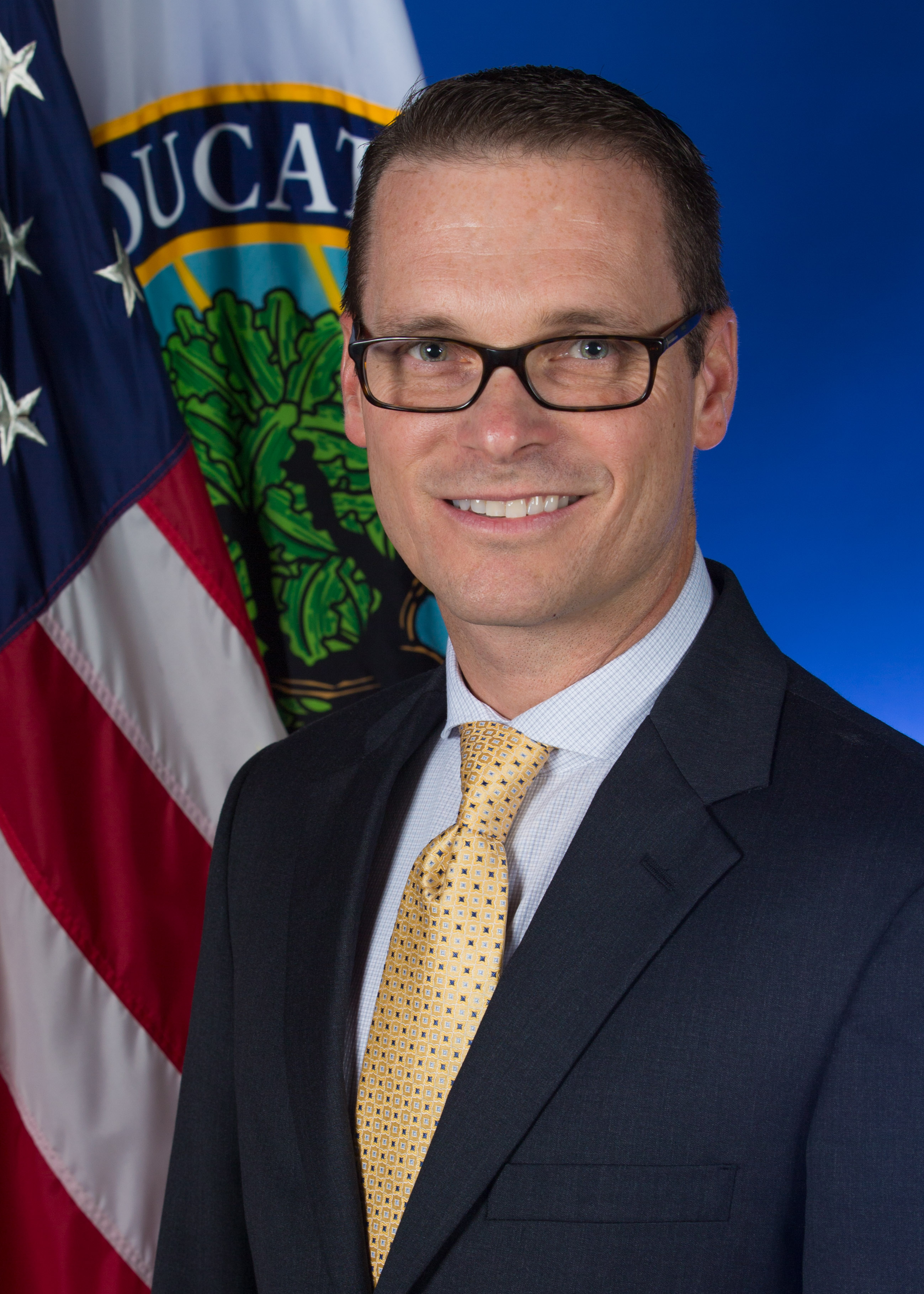

Director of the Office of English Language Acquisition
- In office May 1, 2017 – December 2019
- President: Donald Trump
- Succeeded by: Lorena Orozco McElwain

Personal details
- Born: José Alejandro Viana; September 3, 1969 (age 57) Miami, Florida
- Education: Florida International University, 1992

José Alejandro Viana (born August 9, 1969) was the assistant Deputy Secretary and Director of the Office of English Language Acquisition. He was named assistant deputy secretary and director of the Office of English Language Acquisition (OELA) on April 12, 2017. In November 2019, he announced his intention to depart OELA and join Lexia Learning. Lorena Orozco McElwain became his replacement on May 13, 2020.

== Career ==
Viana began his career in Miami-Dade County Public Schools as an elementary school teacher for English language learners and later was a humanities instructor at an International Baccalaureate World School. The International Baccalaureate Organization aims to develop knowledgeable young people who help to create a better and more peaceful world through intercultural understanding and respect. Concurrently, Viana prepared and delivered general teaching skills sessions to Florida International University's undergraduate students receiving a Bachelor of Science degree in education in all levels and content areas.

After acquiring his degree in educational leadership in 2006, Viana became an elementary school administrator for Durham (North Carolina) Public Schools, where he established the districtwide Title I Parent Advisement Committee for Hispanics to help ensure that Latino children from low-income families met challenging state academic standards.

Viana is a first-generation Cuban immigrant who started his primary years as an English language learner. The magnificent teachers he encountered in his early learning inspired him to become an educator.

He is the older brother of Mercedes Schlapp.
