= Jim Donovan (banker) =

American investment banker

- Born: 1966 or 1967 (age 59–60)
- Education: Massachusetts Institute of Technology (BS, MBA); Harvard University (JD)
- Political party: Republican

James H. Donovan is an American investment banker who is vice chairman of global client coverage at Goldman Sachs. Donovan is also an adjunct professor at the University of Virginia whose YouTube videos have received over five million views.

On March 15, 2017, President Donald Trump nominated Donovan to serve as Deputy Secretary of the Treasury. He was nominated despite concerns within the Trump administration that with the addition of Donovan, there will be "too many Goldman guys" in top posts. Donovan withdrew from consideration on May 19. Donovan later served as a member of the President's Intelligence Advisory Board (PIAB), which oversees and advises the President on all 17 U.S. intelligence agencies.

== Education ==
Donovan earned his Bachelor of Science in chemical engineering from the Massachusetts Institute of Technology, where he was a varsity rower, and a Master of Business Administration from MIT Sloan School in 1989. He earned his Juris Doctor from Harvard Law School in 1993.

== Career ==
Donovan joined Goldman Sachs in 1993 and was named a partner in 2000. During his career at Goldman Sachs, he has worked in investment banking and investment management, and on corporate strategy for the firm.

=== Board memberships ===
Donovan serves on the board of the University of Virginia. He also serves on the board of Karsh Institute of Democracy.

Donovan served on the board of the Dana Farber Cancer Institute and the board of the Foundation for the National Institutes of Health.

== Personal life ==
In May 2024, Donovan became engaged to Hope Hicks, an American public relations executive and political advisor who served in the first Trump administration.
