= Bill Shine =

American government official (born 1963)

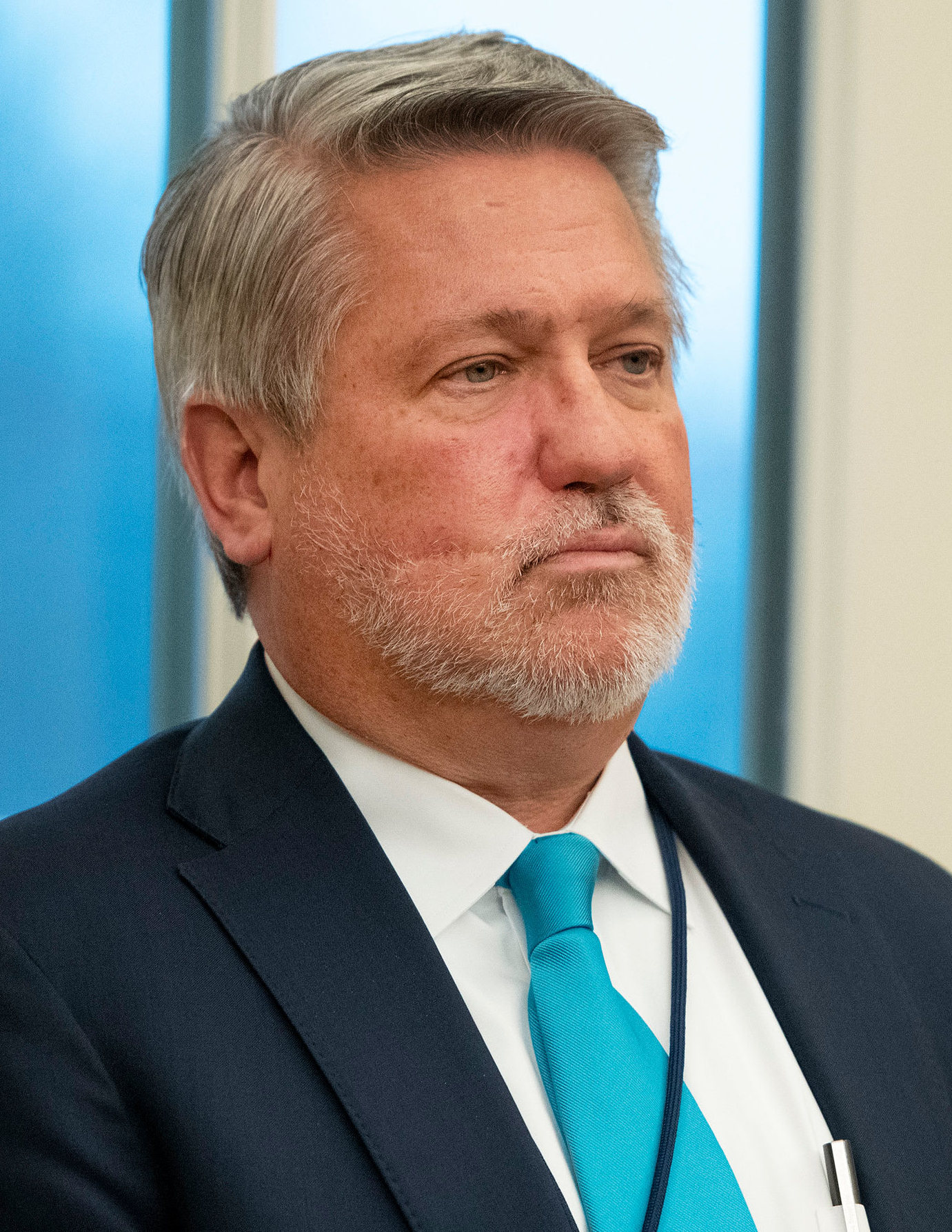
- Shine in 2020

White House Communications Director
- In office July 5, 2018 – March 8, 2019
- President: Donald Trump
- Deputy: Mercedes Schlapp
- Preceded by: Hope Hicks
- Succeeded by: Stephanie Grisham

White House Deputy Chief of Staff for Communications
- In office July 5, 2018 – March 8, 2019
- President: Donald Trump
- Preceded by: Position established
- Succeeded by: Dan Scavino

Personal details
- Born: William Shine; July 4, 1963 (age 63) Farmingville, New York, U.S.
- Party: Republican
- Education: State University of New York at Oswego (BA)

William Shine (born July 4, 1963) is a former White House Deputy Chief of Staff for Communications in the first administration of U.S. President Donald Trump. He spent most of his career as a producer and executive at Fox News. Most recently, he was co-president of Fox News, a position he held for 9 months before he was forced out on May 1, 2017. On March 8, 2019, the White House announced that Shine was resigning to advise President Trump's 2020 presidential campaign.

== Early life and education ==
A twin, Shine grew up in East Northport, Long Island, New York; his father was a New York City police officer. The family were Irish Catholic. He received a B.A. in communications from the State University of New York at Oswego. After college, he worked as a producer for local TV stations on Long Island beginning in 1985 with WLIG-TV.

== Career with Fox News ==
Shine began working for Fox News as the senior producer of Hannity & Colmes.

By 1999, Shine was the senior prime-time producer for Fox News. The following year Shine was the executive producer of Fox News Channel's prime-time programs.

In 2001, on Fox News Channel's The Edge, psychic Sylvia Browne said that she knew where the body of Chandra Levy was located. On Fox News Channel's Judith Regan Tonight, psychic James Van Praagh discussed Chandra Levy. Shine responded to questions about having psychics appear on Fox News Channel by saying that it was "part of the story" because the Levy family had consulted some psychics . Shine said that the psychics provided "another opinion, another side of the story".

By 2004, Shine was the vice president of production for Fox News Channel. The following year, Shine was Fox News Channel's senior vice president of programming.

In 2005, when asked why the U.S. media carried many stories about missing white women (missing white woman syndrome) and disproportionately few about missing black women, Shine commented that "the stories that go national have a twist or an emotional aspect to them that make them interesting".

In 2007, after Bill O'Reilly dined at Sylvia's soul-food restaurant in Harlem, he found his naive preconceptions challenged. O'Reilly admitted he "couldn't get over the fact" that eating at the restaurant "was like going into an all-white suburb in the sense of people were sitting there, and they were ordering and having fun. And there wasn't any kind of craziness at all." Responding to criticism of O'Reilly's statement, Shine said, "This is nothing more than left-wing outlets stirring up false racism accusations for ratings."

In 2009, Fox News host Glenn Beck said that President Barack Obama "has a deep-seated hatred for white people or the white culture" and "is racist", after President Obama said that Cambridge police officers acted "stupidly" by arresting Harvard professor Henry Louis Gates Jr. for breaking into his own home. Responding to Beck's comment, Shine said that Beck had "expressed a personal opinion which represented his own views, not those of the Fox News Channel. And as with all commentators in the cable news arena, he is given the freedom to express his opinions." When Fox News Channel's journalists complained that Beck's show was undermining their work, Shine admitted that Beck was controversial and that the Fox News Channel had assigned a vice president the full-time job of overseeing Beck's show and to review its content in advance.

In 2014, Shine was promoted to FNC's senior executive vice president of programming.

Shine worked alongside of FNC chairman and chief executive officer Roger Ailes for two decades. After Ailes left Fox, the new executive chairman, Rupert Murdoch named Shine and Jack Abernethy as co-presidents of Fox News in August 2016. Shine headed the network's news and programming operations.

Shine was named in at least four lawsuits against FNC alleging sexual harassment or racial discrimination by the company. In April 2017, New York magazine reported that Shine was uncertain about his future at Fox and that he did not think that Rupert Murdoch had been supportive enough of him. A Fox spokesperson denied that the conversations described in the report took place. Fox host Sean Hannity supported Shine, saying that it would be "the total end of the FNC as we know it" if Shine were fired.

On May 1, 2017, Shine was forced out of Fox News. Suzanne Scott, who had served as the organization's senior vice president of programming and development since 2009, was promoted to co-president to take his place.

It was later reported that Shine had been questioned by federal prosecutors, presumably about his role and actions at FNC.

== Trump administration ==
Shine accepted an offer in June 2018 taking a position within the Trump administration as a Deputy White House Chief of Staff overseeing communication within the White House. On July 5, 2018, Shine's controversial appointment became official, despite its criticism personified by those such as Bill Kristol and underscored by protests including from Larry Klayman of Judicial Watch, airing on conservative websites such as Newsmax. In particular, those objecting cited Shine's awareness at the time of the channel's hiring private detectives to intimidate alleged victims of Roger Ailes. Later it was reported Shine's compensation upon leaving Fox was in the neighborhood of $15 million.

On March 8, 2019, it was announced by the White House that Shine was resigning from his position to serve as an advisor to President Trump's 2020 presidential campaign. Shine said in a statement about his resignation that he is "looking forward to working on President Trump's re-election campaign and spending more time with family." In May 2019, acting White House Chief of Staff Mick Mulvaney told Politico that he did not intend to replace Shine with a new communications director.

== Transition after White House ==
In March 2021, the New York Times reported that Mr. Shine had been working with the (then new) cable news network, NewsNation based out of WGN in Chicago. "The unrest at the channel’s flagship newscast started in earnest last month, when an industry publication reported that Bill Shine, a former Fox News co-president and Trump administration official, had been working since June as a “NewsNation” consultant. Until the article appeared, the staff did not know about his involvement, the six people said."

== Personal life ==
Shine is married to Darla (née Seneck) Shine, a former TV producer and also from Fox News.

== See also ==
- Fox News controversies

Political offices
Preceded by Hope Hicks	White House Director of Communications; 2018–2019	Succeeded by Stephanie Grisham
New office	White House Deputy Chief of Staff for Communications; 2018–2019	Vacant Title next held by Dan Scavino; 2020
