= Marc Lotter =

American political advisor (born 1968)

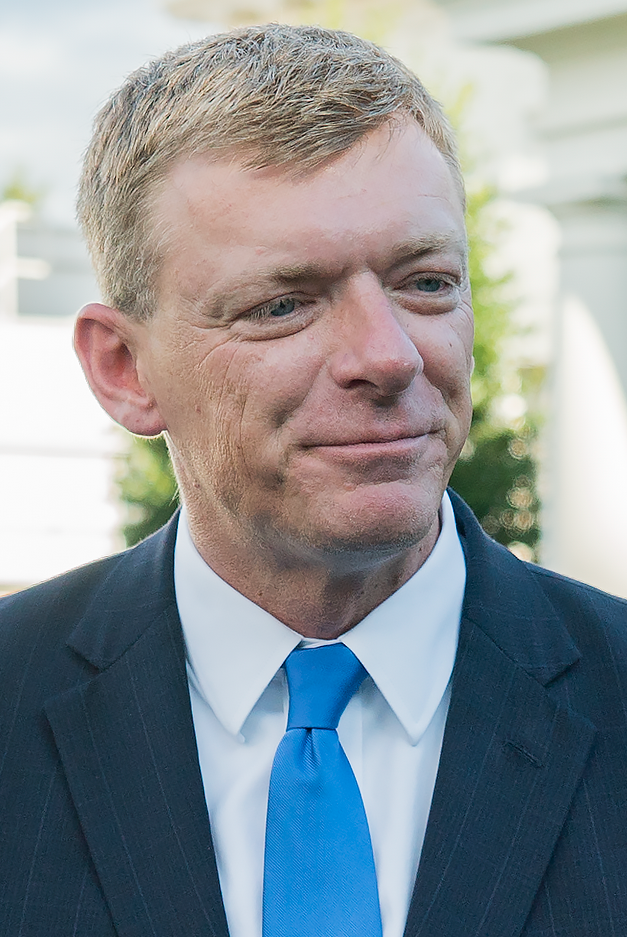

Press Secretary to the Vice President
- In office June 2017 – October 2017
- Vice President: Mike Pence
- Succeeded by: Alyssa Farah

Personal details
- Born: 1970 (age 55–56)
- Party: Republican
- Education: Ball State University (BS)

Marc Lotter (born 1970) is an American political advisor who served as the director of strategic communications for the Donald Trump 2020 presidential campaign. He was previously a Special Assistant to the President and Press Secretary to Vice President Mike Pence.

== Early life and education ==
Lotter was raised in Fort Wayne, Indiana. At age nine, in 1979, Lotter stuffed envelopes for a Democratic Fort Wayne mayoral candidate who was a friend of his father. Lotter earned a Bachelor of Science degree in political science and telecommunications from Ball State University.

As a college student, Lotter earned a scholarship to work at a local PBS station in Muncie, Indiana. During this time, he worked on the production team of The Joy of Painting.

== Career ==
He began his career as a producer for WRTV, WXIN, and WGCL. In 2003 and 2004, he served as the communications director for the Indiana Republican Party. He then served as the communications director for Indiana Governor Mitch Daniels. In 2008, he served as the Indiana communications director for the John McCain 2008 presidential campaign. In 2009 and 2010, Lotter served as the director of communications for the Indiana Department of Workforce Development. From 2010 to 2015, he served as the communications director for Indianapolis Mayor Greg Ballard. In 2015 and 2016, he served as the director of external relations for the Indiana State Board of Education.

In 2016, Lotter served as the deputy campaign manager for Mike Pence's 2016 gubernatorial election. Pence withdrew from the race when he was selected to serve as Donald Trump's running mate. In 2016 and 2017, Lotter served as the press secretary for the Donald Trump 2016 presidential campaign. From June to October 2017, Lotter served as the press secretary to Vice President Mike Pence. Beginning in 2019, he served as the director of strategic communications for the Donald Trump 2020 presidential campaign, which lost to President Joe Biden.

Since 2024, he co-hosts the morning news show Wake Up America on Newsmax TV.
