= Hope Hicks =

American public relations executive (born 1988)

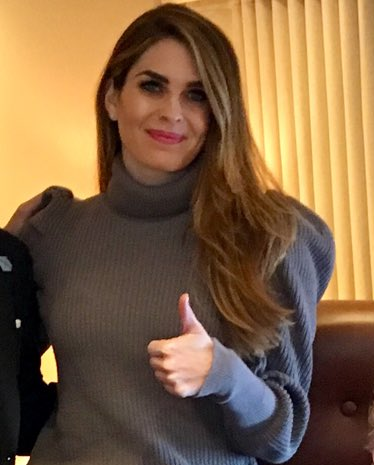
- Hicks on Air Force One in 2017

Counselor to the President
- In office March 9, 2020 – January 12, 2021 Serving with Kellyanne Conway and Derek Lyons
- President: Donald Trump
- Preceded by: Johnny DeStefano
- Succeeded by: Steve Ricchetti; Jeff Zients

White House Communications Director
- In office September 12, 2017 – March 29, 2018; Acting: August 16, 2017 – September 12, 2017
- President: Donald Trump
- Preceded by: Anthony Scaramucci
- Succeeded by: Bill Shine

1st White House Director of Strategic Communications
- In office January 20, 2017 – September 12, 2017
- President: Donald Trump
- Preceded by: Position established
- Succeeded by: Mercedes Schlapp

Personal details
- Born: Hope Charlotte Hicks; October 21, 1988 (age 38) Greenwich, Connecticut, U.S.
- Party: Republican
- Education: Southern Methodist University (BA)

Hope Charlotte Hicks (born October 21, 1988) is an American public relations executive and political advisor best known for her roles in the first Trump administration. She served as White House communications director from 2017 to 2018 and later as counselor to the president from 2020 to 2021. Earlier, she was the Trump 2016 campaign's press secretary and a longtime aide within the Trump Organization. Following her initial departure from the White House, she served as an executive at Fox Corporation before returning to the administration in a senior advisory role.

== Early life and education ==
Hicks is the daughter of Caye Ann (Cavender) Hicks and Paul Burton Hicks III. She grew up in Greenwich, Connecticut. Her father was Regional CEO, Americas, of Ogilvy Public Relations Worldwide, and executive vice president of communications for the National Football League from 2010 to 2015, before becoming managing director of the Glover Park Group. Her family had a history in government administration: her mother was an administrative aide to Ed Jones, a Democratic congressman from Tennessee; her maternal grandfather, G. W. F. "Dutch" Cavender, worked in the U.S. Department of Agriculture as an administrator during two different administrations; and her maternal grandmother, Marilee Cavender, worked at the U.S. Department of Transportation.

Hicks was a teenage model, appearing in Greenwich magazine in 2002. She then posed for a Ralph Lauren campaign with her older sister Mary Grace, and was the face of the Hourglass Adventures novels about a time-traveling 10-year-old. She was the cover model for The It Girl (2005), the first novel in the series by Cecily von Ziegesar.

Hicks attended Greenwich High School, a part of the public Greenwich school system, where she was co-captain of the lacrosse team and graduated in 2006. She then attended Southern Methodist University, where she majored in English and played on a club lacrosse program she helped start. She graduated in 2010.

== Career ==
=== Early career ===
Hicks began in public relations with the New York City firm Zeno Group. She joined public relations firm Hiltzik Strategies in 2012, after meeting the firm's founder at a Super Bowl event, and worked there for Donald Trump's daughter Ivanka Trump, on her fashion line, and then on other Trump ventures.

In August 2014, Hicks joined the Trump Organization full time. She worked for Ivanka Trump inside Trump Tower, helping expand her fashion label (the Ivanka Trump Collection) and modeling for her online store. In October 2014, she began working directly for Donald Trump.

=== Trump 2016 presidential campaign ===
In January 2015, Donald Trump chose Hicks, who was 26 at the time, for the role of press secretary for his potential presidential campaign. Trump summoned her to his office and, as she tells it, "Mr. Trump looked at me and said, 'I'm thinking about running for president, and you're going to be my press secretary.'" Until that time, she had never worked in politics or volunteered on a campaign. After Trump's first primary victories, Hicks was asked to choose between staying with the Trump Organization or working on the campaign full time. She initially decided to leave the campaign, but Trump convinced her to remain and she stayed on as press secretary.

During the campaign, she played the role of gatekeeper to press members who wanted to speak with Trump, handling over 250 requests a day and deciding which reporters would be allowed to speak with him. Hicks also took dictation from Trump for his tweets, and then sent the text to another person in the Trump organization who sent the tweets from Trump's official account. When in New York City, she would spend most of her day in Trump's office, handling inquiries from the press and taking dictation from him to tweet. In January 2017, Hicks was included on the Forbes 30 Under 30 list, having "served as a one-woman press team" for Trump's presidential campaign.

=== White House communications director ===
On December 22, 2016, it was announced that Hicks would become part of the Trump administration, in the newly created position of the White House director of strategic communications.

On August 16, 2017, she was appointed as the interim White House communications director (the last director having been Anthony Scaramucci). Politico labeled her the "Untouchable Hope Hicks," as she was considered one of the few White House officials whose job was safe, and one of only two White House communications officials Scaramucci had announced were definitely staying when he was first hired. She was appointed permanent White House communications director on September 12, 2017.

On February 27, 2018, Hicks gave nine hours of closed-door testimony to the House Intelligence Committee. She acknowledged that she sometimes had to tell "white lies" in her work as communications director, but refused to answer any questions about her tenure in the White House. The next day the White House confirmed to The New York Times that Hicks planned to resign. According to "multiple sources," she had been planning to resign for months, and her announcement was unrelated to the events of the preceding 24 hours. She officially resigned on March 29, 2018.

=== Fox Corporation ===
Between March 2018 and March 2020, Hicks was Fox Corporation's chief communications officer and executive vice president. During this time, she made over $1.8 million.

=== In the news, 2019 ===
On March 4, 2019, the House Judiciary Committee sent a letter to Hicks requesting information regarding alleged obstruction of justice by the current administration. (She was mentioned over 180 times in Robert Mueller's report on Russian election interference and possible obstruction of justice; the report was released on April 18, 2019.) The Committee subpoenaed documents and her testimony on May 21, 2019. On June 4, 2019, the Trump White House invoked executive privilege, directing Hicks not to provide any documents related to her employment in the Trump administration. She agreed to testify in a closed-door session on June 19, 2019, during which lawyers for the Trump administration forbade Hicks from answering questions 155 times, claiming that due to "absolute immunity," Hicks "may not speak about anything that occurred during the time of her employment in the White House as a close adviser to the president." Hicks testified on the scheduled date, and also complied with the White House request to not answer questions.

On July 18, 2019, unredacted search warrant documents from the Michael Cohen criminal case were released, and it appeared a strong possibility that Hicks had known about hush payments made by Michael Cohen on behalf of Donald Trump before the dates she had previously claimed.

=== Counselor to the president ===
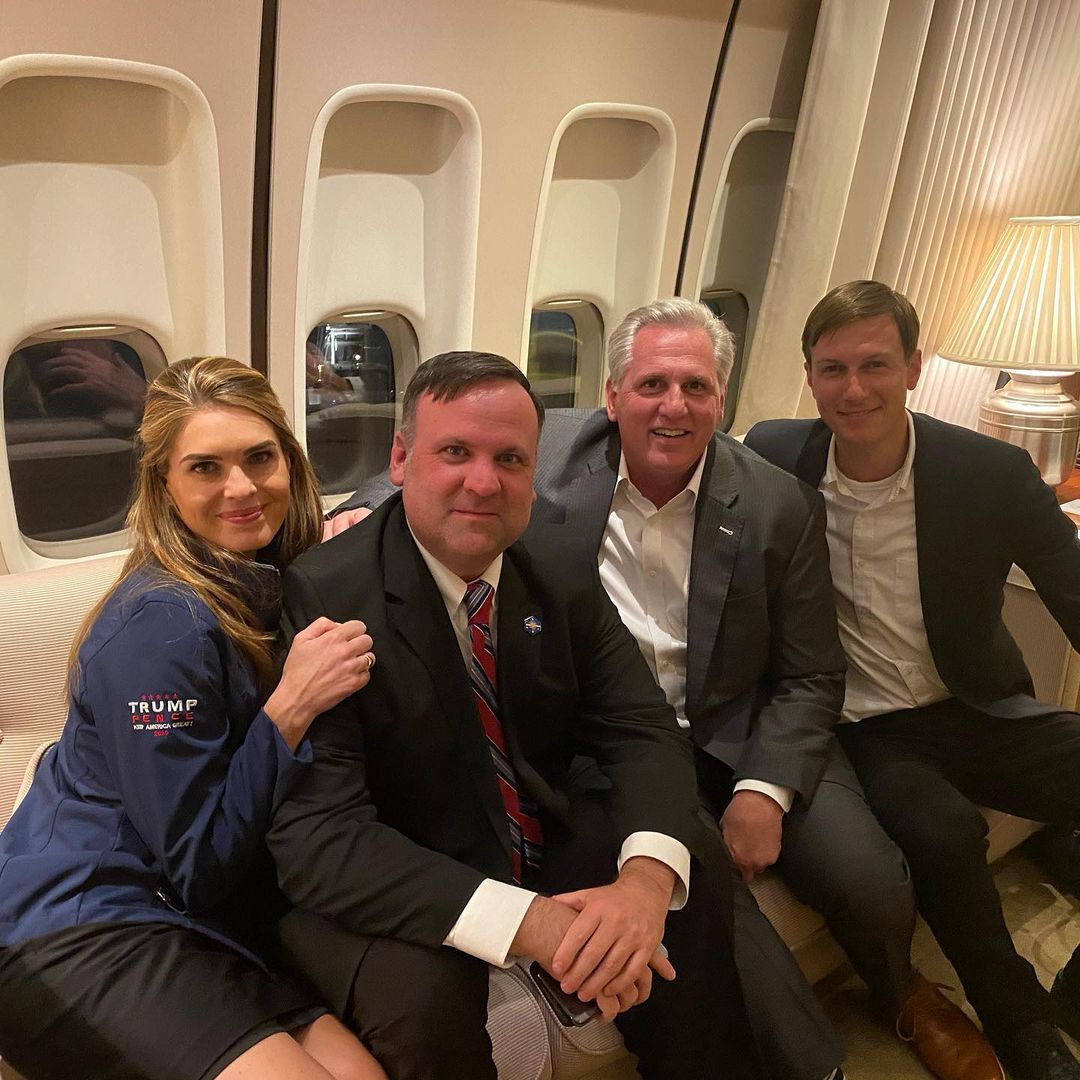
Hicks as an aide to Jared Kushner with White House deputy chief of staff Dan Scavino and House minority leader Kevin McCarthy during the 2020 presidential campaign

In February 2020, it was announced that Hicks would return to the White House Office as an aide to Jared Kushner and counselor to President Donald Trump. She officially assumed her roles at the White House on March 9.

On June 1, 2020, during the George Floyd protests in Washington, Hicks and others suggested that Trump walk to St. John's Episcopal Church go across the street from the White House to make a public appearance. Law enforcement subsequently used tear gas and other riot control tactics to forcefully clear peaceful protesters from Lafayette Square and surrounding streets, creating a path for President Donald Trump and senior administration officials, including Hicks, to the church. It was later reported Hicks had suggested Trump say a prayer at this appearance, but he held up a Bible instead.

On October 1, 2020, it was announced that Hicks had tested positive for COVID-19. Because of her positive test and her recent travels with the president, President Trump and First Lady Melania Trump were also tested. Hours later, Trump announced that both he and Melania had tested positive and would immediately go into quarantine at the White House.

The New York Times reported in June 2022 that, in the weeks after Trump falsely insisted the 2020 election had been stolen from him, some of his aides quietly disagreed with him. Hicks advised Trump to move on, leading him to say, "Well, Hope doesn't believe in me," to which she replied, "No, I don't. Nobody's convinced me otherwise." She disappeared from public view in the final weeks of Trump's presidency.

=== Post-White House ===
On October 25, 2022, Hicks sat for a "transcribed interview" with the United States House Select Committee on the January 6th Attack. Part of the interview, which was videotaped, was televised during the committee's December 19, 2022, public hearing. It featured Hicks stating that during a conversation about his legacy, Trump told her "something along the lines of 'nobody will care about my legacy if I lose ... the only thing that matters is winning.'"

On April 1, 2024, it was reported Hicks would testify for the prosecution in the Trump hush money criminal trial. On May 3, 2024, she did so. She provided some detail on Trump's relationship with former American Media Inc. head David Pecker during the 2016 Republican Party presidential primaries and also on how Trump wanted his alleged affairs with Stormy Daniels and Karen McDougal covered up to avoid embarrassment against him and his family in the wake of the Access Hollywood tape release.

In November, Hicks stated her intention of voting for Donald Trump in the 2024 presidential election.

In August 2025, Hicks was appointed chief operating officer (COO) of Devil May Care Media, the media company founded by Megyn Kelly, where she is responsible for business development, operations, and expansion of the company's podcast and digital content network.

== Personal life ==
Before Trump's 2016 election, Hicks split her time between Greenwich and Manhattan. When Trump was elected, she moved to Washington, D.C.

Hicks was dating Rob Porter, White House staff secretary for Trump, at the time of Porter's 2018 resignation.

In May 2024, Hicks became engaged to Jim Donovan, a Goldman Sachs investment banker.

== See also ==
- Natalie Harp – American political aide (born 1991)

Political offices
Preceded by Anthony Scaramucci	White House Director of Communications; 2017–2018	Succeeded by Bill Shine
