= White House Director of Strategic Communications =

U.S. presidential staff member in charge of messaging and media

- Incumbent; Vacant since December 4, 2020
- Executive Office of the President
- Reports to: White House Chief of Staff
- Appointer: The president
- Formation: January 20, 2017
- First holder: Hope Hicks

The White House director of strategic communications was a senior member of the president's staff, reporting directly to the president and working in conjunction with the White House communications director.

President Donald Trump formed the position in late 2016, naming one of his closest advisors and earliest political aides, Hope Hicks, as the nation's first holder of this office.

The exact responsibilities have never been made clear to the public, but are assumed to include coordinating media appearances, advising the President on messaging, and serving as a confidant on key matters involving personnel and in executing the President's agenda, an extension of the role Hicks served in the Trump campaign and transition.

The position was left vacant after the end of the first Trump administration, with Trump's successor Joe Biden not appointing anyone to the position.

== Directors ==
Image	Officeholder	Term start	Term end	Term duration	President
	Hope Hicks	January 20, 2017	September 12, 2017	235 days	Donald Trump
	Mercedes Schlapp	September 12, 2017	July 1, 2019	1 year, 292 days	Donald Trump
	Alyssa Farah	April 7, 2020	December 4, 2020	241 days	Donald Trump
