= Johanna Maska =

American communication professional

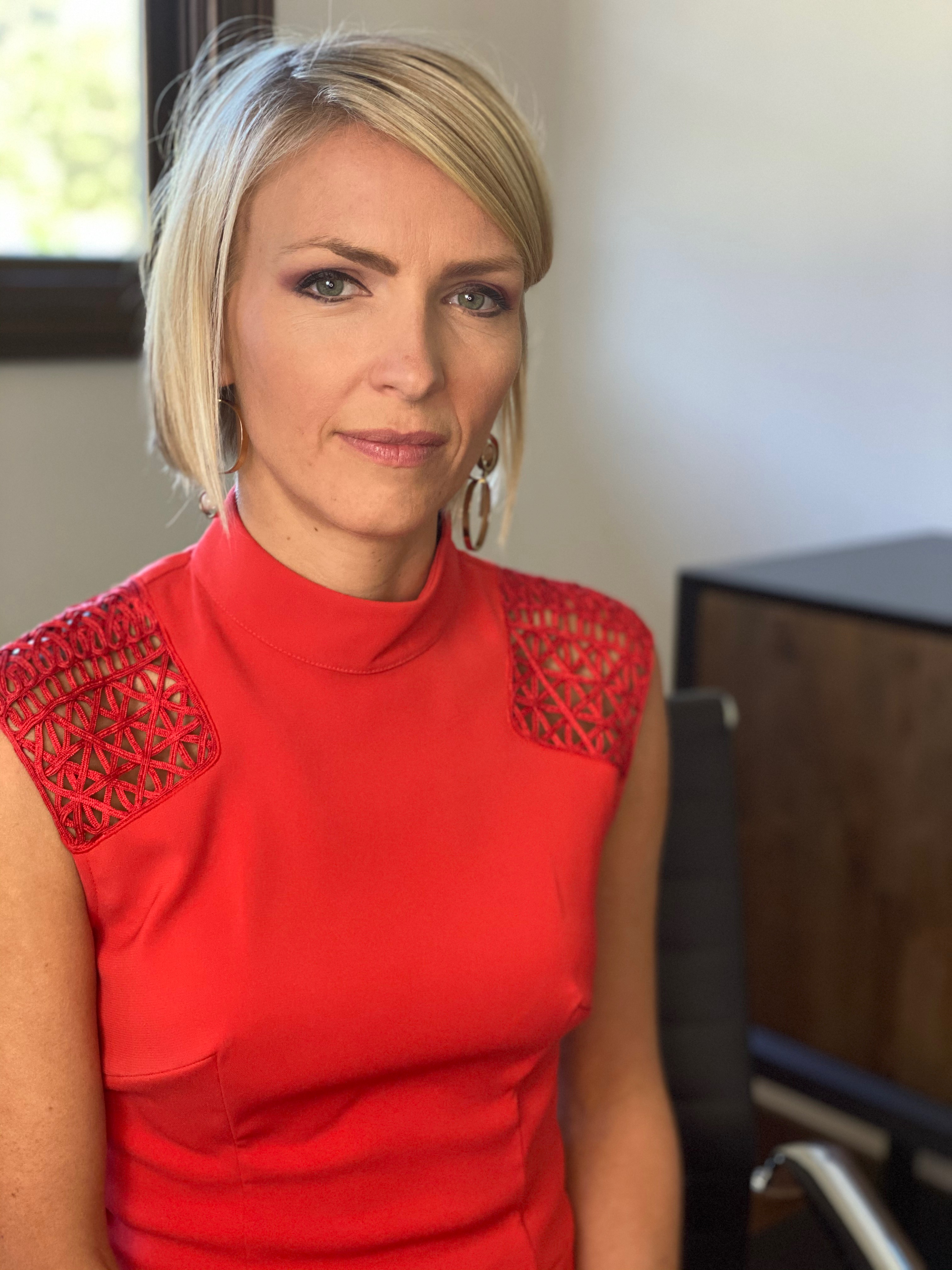
- Maska in 2020
- Born: February 11, 1982 (age 44)
- Education: University of Kansas (BA)
- Occupation: Communications consultant
- Political party: Democratic
- Website: www.johannamaska.com

Johanna Maska is an American communication professional. She was a longstanding aide to U.S. President Barack Obama. She is CEO of the consulting firm Global Situation Room.

== Life ==
Maska grew up in Galesburg, Illinois. She went to the University of Kansas, which she credited at a commencement address for her optimism. She worked for Kathleen Sebelius.

Beginning in June 2007 Iowa caucuses, Maska worked for the Obama campaign. She worked as Director of Press Advance for President Obama in the White House. In her role as director of press advance, Maska led the advance work, and messaging for the White House. She organized multi-national summits located in the United States.

In 2015, she left the White House moving from DC to LA, recruited by Austin Beutner to join the Los Angeles Times senior leadership team. In 2015, Maska resigned from The Times after Tribune Publishing fired Austin Beutner. She taught communications at University of Southern California. She was senior vice president of communication and marketing for Karmic Labs.

She is a co-host of the podcast, Pod is a Woman.

Maska is the CEO of the Global Situation Room, a public affairs practice that focuses on crisis communications, reputation management, thought leadership and global markets.

Maska has spoken about families balancing it all, as she had her son while working at the White House. She organized the President's Address to the Nation from Afghanistan seven weeks after she gave birth to her son. She continued to travel for work with a young son, and continued working at the White House until her son was 3.
