= Mercedes Schlapp =

American lobbyist and columnist (born 1972)

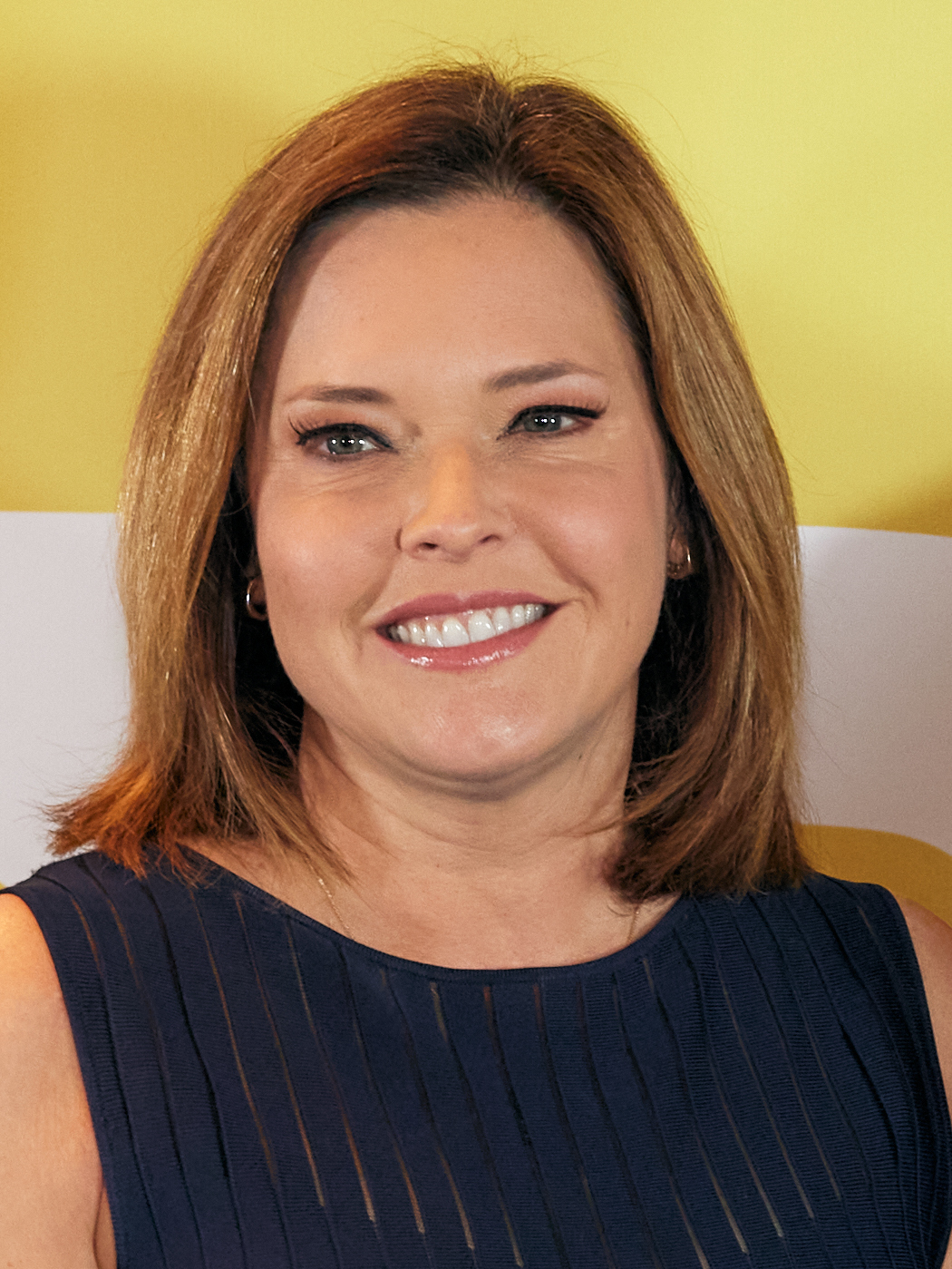

2nd White House Director of Strategic Communications
- In office September 12, 2017 – July 1, 2019
- President: Donald Trump
- Leader: Hope Hicks; Bill Shine
- Preceded by: Hope Hicks
- Succeeded by: Alyssa Farah

Personal details
- Born: Mercedes Viana; December 27, 1972 (age 53) Miami, Florida, U.S.
- Party: Republican
- Spouse: Matt Schlapp (m. 2002)
- Children: 5
- Education: Florida International University (BA); George Washington University (MPA)

Mercedes Schlapp (née Viana; born December 27, 1972) is an American communications specialist and political commentator for both English and Spanish media. She has served in two presidential administrations as director of specialty media under George W. Bush and as White House Director of Strategic Communications in the Trump administration from September 2017 to July 2019. She went on to work on the Trump 2020 re-election campaign as senior advisor for strategic communications.

She is also co-founder of Cove Strategies, and advises media strategy for corporate and nonprofit organizations.

== Personal life ==
Schlapp is a first-generation Cuban-American born in Florida, the younger sister of educator José Alejandro Viana. She is married to Matt Schlapp, the chair of the American Conservative Union. The Schlapps have five daughters.

Schlapp credits her interest in politics to her father, who was a political prisoner in 1960s Cuba under the regime of Fidel Castro.

== Education ==
Schlapp earned a bachelor's degree from Florida International University in 1994 and a master of public administration from George Washington University. In December 2019 she was awarded an FIU Medallion—Outstanding Alumna for her achievements.

== Career ==
=== Campaigns and Bush administration ===
Schlapp worked on local and national political campaigns, as well as the 2000 and 2004 presidential campaigns for George W. Bush, and was Director of Specialty Media in his administration.

Schlapp also worked as senior advisor for strategic communications on the Trump reelection campaign in 2020.

=== Media ===
Schlapp has been a Fox News contributor and a columnist for several publications including U.S. News & World Report and The Washington Times. On Newsmax TV, she was a regular co-host of Prime News with Jenn Pellegrino until it ended December 31, 2023, and she is currently on the panel of The Right Squad.

=== Media Strategy ===
Together with her husband Schlapp founded Cove Strategies, a media strategy and lobbying firm based in Alexandria, Virginia, in 2009. According to Open Secrets, the firm performs services mainly in the areas of telecommunications, trade, and health issues and earned greater income during the Trump administration than it did during the Obama administration.

=== NRA ===
She was a board member of the National Rifle Association of America before joining the White House. She was an aid consultant at the NRA, earning $60,000 from the NRA in 2015, and $45,000 in 2016, according to NRA tax filings.

=== Trump administration ===
On September 12, 2017, President Donald Trump's administration announced that Schlapp would serve as Director of Strategic Communications. During her time with the Trump Administration, Schlapp focused on issues such as school safety, opioids, infrastructure and trade. Prior to joining the Trump administration, Schlapp made numerous statements that were strongly critical of Trump.

Schlapp attracted attention when she and her husband left the White House Correspondents Dinner early in April 2018, saying that she was disgusted by comedian Michelle Wolf's jokes aimed at Press Secretary Sarah Huckabee Sanders. In a limousine en route to an exclusive NBC/MSNBC afterparty, she tweeted that Wolf's comedy routine is "why America hates the out of touch leftist media elite".

In May 2018, Schlapp defended White House aide Kelly Sadler after she joked that John McCain's opposition to CIA Director nominee Gina Haspel was irrelevant because "he’s dying anyway".

=== George Floyd protests ===
In June 2020, amid the George Floyd protests against racism and police brutality, she retweeted praise for a man who was wielding a chainsaw against protestors while he was yelling the N-word. After Politico asked for comment, she retweeted another account that posted the video of the chainsaw-wielding man but which muted the N-word. After Politico published the story, she apologized.

=== Political positions ===
Schlapp opposes same-sex marriage. She called President Barack Obama’s decision to support it a "political ploy".

=== Lawsuit ===
In January 2023, Schlapp was named as a defendant in a lawsuit by a former aide to Georgia Republican Senate nominee Herschel Walker. The lawsuit accused Mercedes of an effort to discredit the aide after he alleged sexual battery against her husband Matt Schlapp. In response to their reporting on the lawsuit, Schlapp publicly attacked The Daily Beast as "Satan's publication." Walker's aide voluntarily dismissed the lawsuit on March 26, 2024.
