= Nuber =

Nuber is a surname. Notable people with the surname include:

- Hermann Nuber (1935–2022), German footballer
- Larry Nuber (1948–2000), American auto racing announcer
- Philip W. Nuber (1939–2003), American Air Force Major General and director of the Defense Mapping Agency
