= Philip W. Nuber =

United States Air Force general (1939–2003)

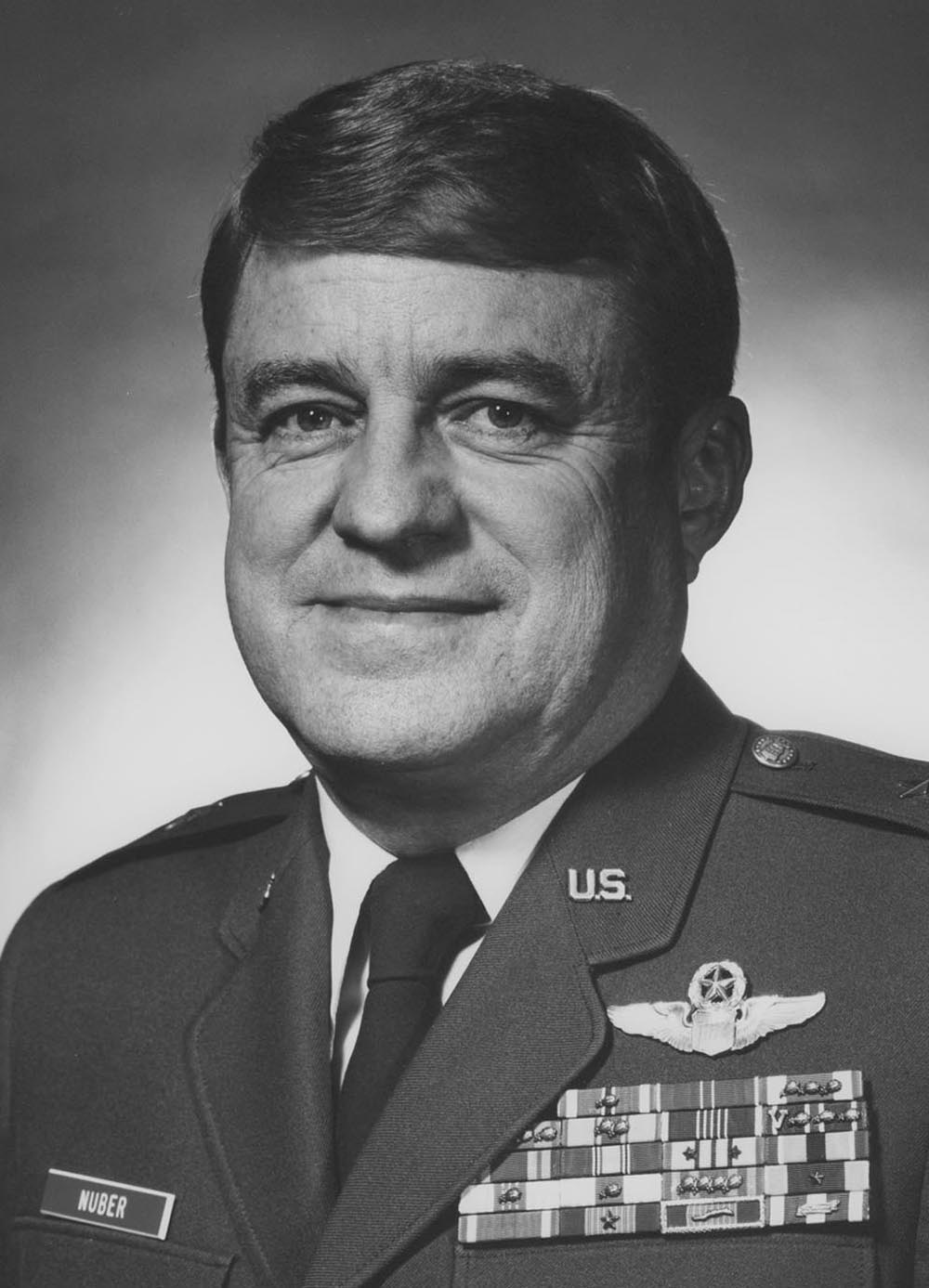
- Official portrait of Major General Nuber
- Born: September 27, 1939; Bozeman, Montana, US
- Died: May 21, 2003 (aged 63)
- Buried: Arlington National Cemetery
- Allegiance: United States of America
- Branch: United States Air Force
- Service years: 1962–1996
- Rank: Major General

Major General Philip William Nuber (September 27, 1939 – May 21, 2003) of United States Air Force, was director of the Defense Mapping Agency from December 1994 to May 1996.

== Early life and education ==
Nuber was born in Bozeman, Montana on September 27, 1939. He earned a BS degree in electrical engineering from Montana State University in 1962. Nuber graduated from the Air Command and Staff College in 1975 and the Industrial College of the Armed Forces the following year. He completed the University of Pittsburgh's Management Program for Executives in 1987 and Harvard University's National and International Security Management Course in 1991.

== Air Force career ==
Nuber began active military service in March 1962, and earned his pilot wings in June 1963. His assignments included:

- 4527th Combat Crew Training Squadron, Tactical Air Command, Luke Air Force Base, Arizona
- 10th Tactical Fighter Squadron, Headquarters, U.S. Air Forces in Europe, Hahn Air Base, Germany
- 510th Tactical Fighter Squadron, Pacific Air Forces, Cu Chi and Bien Hoa, South Vietnam
- Instructor pilot, 425th Tactical Fighter Training Squadron, Williams AFB, Arizona
- 71st Tactical Air Support Group and 702nd Tactical Air Support Squadron, Fort Hood, Texas
- 357th Tactical Fighter Squadron and 333rd Tactical Fighter Training Squadron at Davis-Monthan AFB, Arizona
- 510th Tactical Fighter Training Squadron, Korat Royal Thai Air Force Base, Thailand
- 358th Tactical Fighter Training Squadron, 355th Tactical Fighter Wing and 354th Tactical Fighter Squadron, Davis-Monthan AFB, Arizona
- Chief, Officer Command Assignments Division, Headquarters Tactical Air Command, Langley AFB, Virginia
- Commander, 425th Tactical Fighter Squadron, Williams AFB, Arizona
- Assistant deputy commander for operations, 405th Tactical Training Wing, Luke AFB, Arizona
- Assistant deputy commander (then commander), 833rd Combat Support Group, Holloman AFB, New Mexico
- Vice commander (then commander), 343rd Tactical Fighter Wing, Alaskan Air Command (AAC), Eielson AFB, Alaska
- Deputy commander, Air Force Combat Operations Staff, deputy director, operations, directorate for plans and operations, Headquarters, U.S. Air Force
- Deputy director, Office of Military Support, Headquarters U.S. Army
- Temporary deputy commander, Joint Task Force Middle East, United States Central Command, Middle East
- Assistant deputy under the Secretary of the Air Force (international affairs)
- Chief, Joint U.S. Military Mission for Aid to Turkey, Ankara, Turkey

== Defense Mapping Agency ==
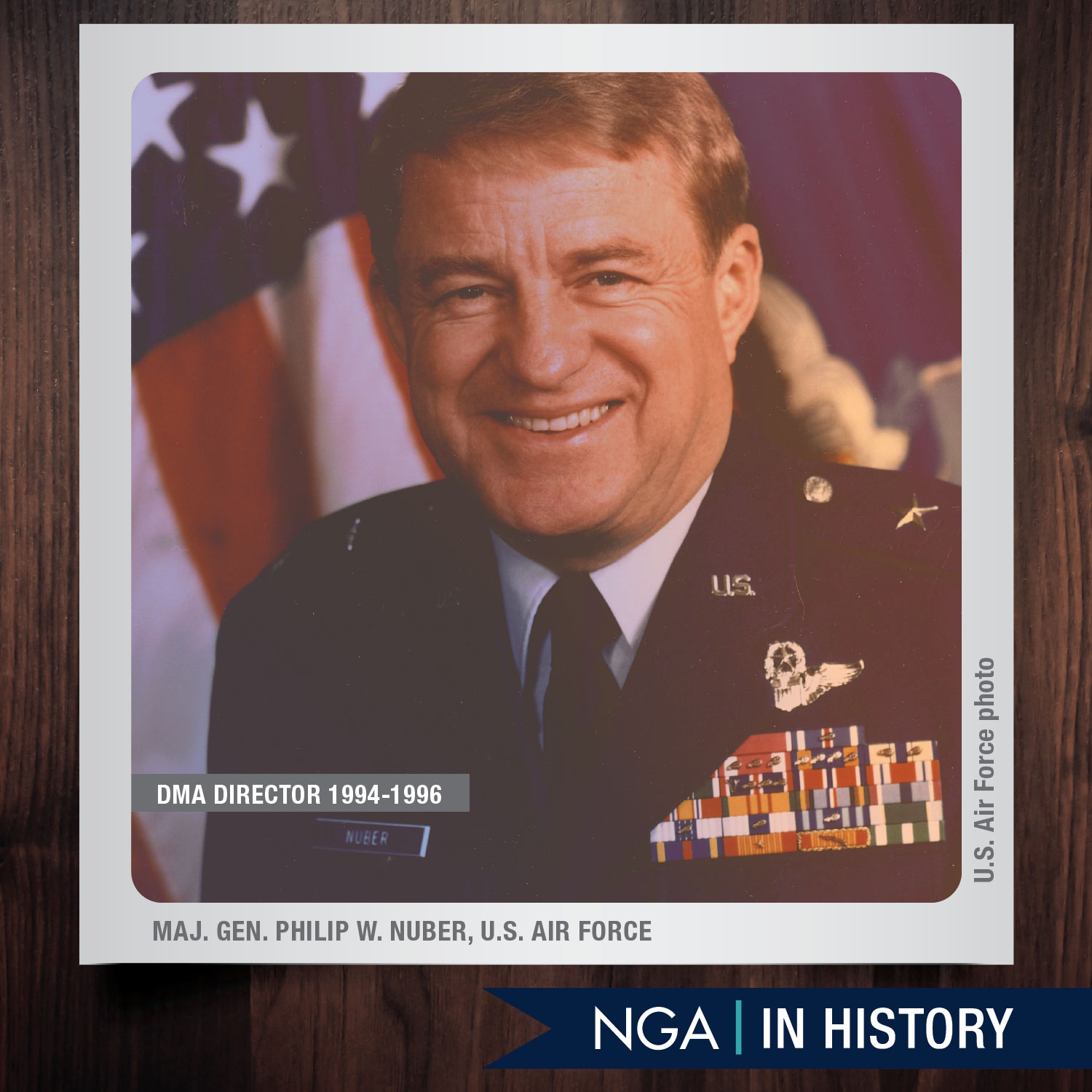

Nuber became director of the Defense Mapping Agency in December 1994, a post he held until May 1996. He brought the DMA to world attention when he provided the Global Geospatial Information System (GGIS) to President Clinton's Dayton Peace Accord to settle the boundaries of Bosnia, Croatia, Serbia, and Kosovo. The leaders saw three-dimensional satellite imagery and mapping data of their nations, enabling them to quickly resolve boundary issues.

As director, Nuber oversaw the agency's reinvention task force. Initiated by Nuber's predecessor, Major General Raymund E. O'Mara, the task force sought to transform the DMA from a map provider to a timely source of geospatial information and services. It presented Nuber with a proposal for a completely restructured agency based on three groups: Operations, Acquisition and Technology, and Installation. He embraced and implemented the changes, profoundly changing the DMA and enhancing its talent and tradecraft. Nuber retired June 1, 1996; after 34 years of service.

== Death ==
Nuber died of cancer on May 21, 2003. He was buried at Arlington National Cemetery.

== Awards and decorations ==
Nuber had more than 4,200 flying hours and was a veteran of three hundred combat missions. His military awards and decorations include:

- Defense Distinguished Service Medal
- Distinguished Service Medal
- Legion of Merit
- Distinguished Flying Cross with bronze oak leaf cluster
- Bronze Star Medal
- Meritorious Service Medal with three bronze oak leaf clusters
- Air Medal with three silver oak leaf clusters and bronze oak leaf cluster
- Air Force Commendation Medal with two bronze oak leaf clusters
- Army Commendation Medal
