= Raymund E. O'Mara =

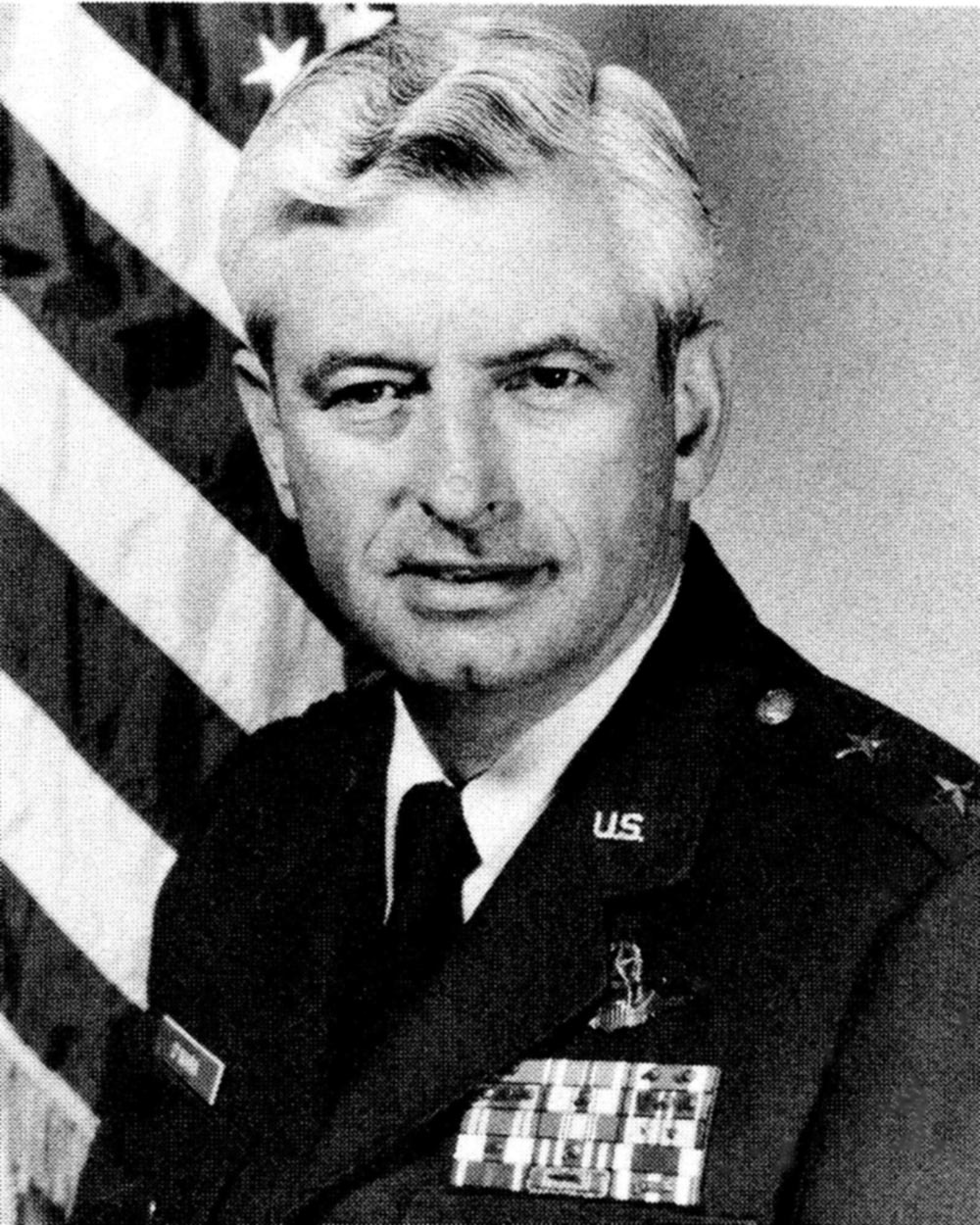
- Official portrait of Major General O'Mara
- Allegiance: United States of America
- Branch: United States Air Force
- Service years: 1963 to 1994
- Rank: Major General

Major General Raymund E. O'Mara of United States Air Force, was tenth Director of the Defense Mapping Agency from June 1993 till his retirement in December 1994; with headquarters at Fairfax, Virginia. As director of DMA, O'Mara moved forward with the implementation of the Global Geospatial Information System, and also initiated the agency's reinvention task force.

== Early life, and education ==
Major General Raymund E. O'Mara earned a BS from the New Jersey Institute of Technology in 1963 and an MS from the State University of New York in 1974. He completed the Royal Air Force Staff College, Bracknell, England, in 1976; the Air War College in 1979; and the Executive Development Program at University of Michigan, in 1986.

== Career ==
Major General O'Mara began his active duty service in 1963. After flight training, he served four years with the 346th and 348th Bomb Squadrons at Westover Air Force Base in Massachusetts.

He served on the Royal Air Force operations staff on an exchange program at High Wycombe, England, and then commanded the 528th Bomb Squadron and served with the 380th Bomb Wing, Strategic Air Command in Plattsburgh. In the early 1980s he served in the Office of the Deputy Chief of Staff for Plans and Operations, Headquarters U.S. Air Force, and then returned as commander of the 380th Bombardment Wing. He held another staff position at the Office of the Deputy Chief of Staff for Plans and Operations at Headquarters, U.S. Air Force.

He also served as deputy chief of staff for strategic plans, Headquarters Strategic Air Command, and deputy director for force employment plans, Joint Strategic Target Planning Staff (JSTP) at Offutt air force base, Nebraska. He then served as deputy commander in chief and chief of staff, U.S. Atlantic Command, Norfolk, Virginia.

== Defense Mapping Agency ==
As director of the Defense Mapping Agency from 1993 to 1994, Major General O'Mara moved forward with the implementation of the Global Geospatial Information System, which was made directly accessible to combat commanders of the Rapid Deployment Forces. The GGIS was a major paradigm shift in warfare with the delivery of geographic information to fast-moving military forces.

O’Mara also initiated the agency's reinvention task force, which transformed DMA from a map-provider to a timely source of geospatial information and services. He retired on December 1, 1994.

== Accolades ==
Major General O’Mara accumulated 3,673 flying hours and flew more than 170 combat missions in Southeast Asia. His awards and decorations include:

- Defense Distinguished Service Medal with oak leaf cluster
- Legion of Merit with oak leaf cluster
- Distinguished Flying Cross
- Meritorious Service Medal with two oak leaf clusters
- Air Medal with silver oak leaf cluster and two bronze oak leaf clusters
- Air Force Commendation Medal with oak leaf cluster
- Air Force Outstanding Unit Award with “V” device, and two bronze oak leaf clusters
- Combat Readiness Medal
- National Defense Service Medal with bronze service star
- Vietnam Service Medal with silver service star and bronze service star
- Republic of Vietnam Gallantry Cross with Palm
- Republic of Vietnam Campaign Medal
