= Executive Office appointments of the first Trump administration =

The core White House staff appointments, and most Executive Office of the President officials generally, are not required to be confirmed by the U.S. Senate, with a handful of exceptions (e.g., the director of the Office of Management and Budget, the chair and members of the Council of Economic Advisers, and the United States trade representative). There are about 4,000 positions in the Executive Office of the President.

== Color key ==
Denotes appointees serving in offices that did not require Senate confirmation.

Denotes appointees confirmed by the Senate.

Denotes appointees awaiting Senate confirmation.

Denotes appointees serving in an acting capacity.

Denotes appointees who have left office or offices which have been disbanded.

Denotes nominees who were withdrawn prior to being confirmed or assuming office.

== Appointments ==
=== White House Office ===
Office	Nominee	Assumed office	Left office
White House Chief of Staff	Mark Meadows	March 31, 2020	January 20, 2021
White House Deputy Chief of Staff (Operations)	Tony Ornato	December 7, 2019	January 20, 2021
White House Deputy Chief of Staff (Policy Coordination)	Chris Liddell	March 19, 2018	January 20, 2021
Deputy Assistant to the President and Deputy White House Policy Coordinator	Nick Butterfield	January 20, 2017	January 20, 2021
White House Deputy Chief of Staff (Communications)	Dan Scavino	April 21, 2020	January 20, 2021
White House Director of Social Media	Dan Scavino	January 22, 2017	January 20, 2021
Counselor to the President	Hope Hicks	March 9, 2020	January 12, 2021
Chief of Staff to the Senior Counselor	Hope Renee Hudson	TBA	January 20, 2021
Senior Advisor to the President	Ivanka Trump	March 29, 2017	January 20, 2021
Senior Advisor to the President	Jared Kushner	January 22, 2017	January 20, 2021
Director of the Office of American Innovation	Jared Kushner	March 27, 2017	January 20, 2021
Assistant to the President and Special Representative for International Negotiations	Avi Berkowitz	November 1, 2019	January 20, 2021
Senior Advisor to the President (Policy)	Stephen Miller	January 20, 2017	January 20, 2021
White House Director of Speechwriting	Stephen Miller	January 22, 2017	January 20, 2021
White House Principal Deputy Chief of Staff	John Fleming	March 30, 2020	January 20, 2021
Director of the Domestic Policy Council	Brooke Rollins	May 24, 2020	January 20, 2021
Deputy Director of the Domestic Policy Council	Jennifer B. Lichter	May 24, 2020	January 20, 2021
Director of the National Economic Council	Larry Kudlow	April 2, 2018	January 20, 2021
Deputy Director of the National Economic Council	Everett Eissenstat	June 2017	July 2018
National Security Council	Everett Eissenstat	June 2017	July 2018
Deputy Assistant to the President for International Economic Affairs	Everett Eissenstat	June 2017	July 2018
Deputy Director of the National Economic Council	Andrew Olmem	June 2018	January 20, 2021
Deputy Assistant to the President (Economic Policy)	Andrew Olmem	June 2018	January 20, 2021
Deputy Director of the National Economic Council	Cletus R. Willems III	July 2018	January 20, 2021
Chief Economist of the National Economic Council	Joseph Lavorgna		January 20, 2021
White House Cabinet Secretary	Kristan King Nevins	September 24, 2019	January 20, 2021
Deputy Cabinet Secretary	Matthew J. Flynn		January 20, 2021
Deputy Cabinet Secretary for Organizational Structure	Kirk R. Marshall		January 20, 2021
White House Communications Director	Vacant		
Deputy Director of Communications	Julie Hahn		January 20, 2021
White House Director of Strategic Communications	Alyssa Farah	April 7, 2020	December 4, 2020
Senior Advisor for Communications	Ben Williamson		January 20, 2021
White House Press Secretary	Kayleigh McEnany	April 7, 2020	January 20, 2021
White House Principal Deputy Press Secretary	Brian R. Morgenstern	July 20, 2020	January 20, 2021
White House Deputy Press Secretary	Judd Deere	January 31, 2019	January 20, 2021
White House Chief Digital Officer	Ory Rinat	February 6, 2017	June 20, 2020
White House Deputy Chief Digital Officer	Katlyn L. Parnitzke	TBA	January 20, 2021
Chief of Staff to the First Lady	Stephanie Grisham	April 7, 2020	January 6, 2021
Press Secretary to the First Lady	Stephanie Grisham	April 7, 2020	January 6, 2021
Deputy Chief of Staff for Policy for the First Lady	Emma Doyle	January 3, 2019	April 21, 2020
Director of Policy for the Office of the First Lady	Arthur Harding	TBA	January 20, 2021
White House Social Secretary	Anna Cristina Niceta Lloyd	February 22, 2017 (Appointed by the First Lady)	January 6, 2021
Director of White House Information Technology	Roger L. Stone	TBA	January 20, 2021
Deputy Director of White House Information Technology	David Lambrecht	TBA	January 20, 2021
Director of Intergovernmental Affairs	Douglas Hoelscher	June 2018	January 20, 2021
Deputy Director of Intergovernmental Affairs	William F. Crozer	TBA	January 20, 2021
Associate Director of Intergovernmental Affairs	Zachery Tate Michael	TBA	January 20, 2021
White House Director of Legislative Affairs	Amy Swonger	June 5, 2020	January 20, 2021
White House Deputy Director of Legislative Affairs (House Liaison)	Joyce Meyer	February 13, 2017	January 20, 2021
White House Deputy Director of Legislative Affairs (Senate Liaison)	Christopher Cox		January 20, 2021
White House Deputy Director of Legislative Affairs	Benjamin R. Howard	TBA	January 20, 2021
Director of the Office of Administration	Monica J. Block	TBA	January 20, 2021
Deputy Director of the Office of Administration	Monica Block	TBA	January 20, 2021
Chief Financial Officer in the Office of Administration	Heather D. Martin	June 2019	January 20, 2021
National Security Advisor	Robert O'Brien	September 18, 2019	January 20, 2021
Deputy National Security Advisor	Matthew Pottinger	September 22, 2019	January 7, 2021
Assistant to the President	Matthew Pottinger	September 22, 2019	January 7, 2021
Homeland Security Advisor	Julia Nesheiwat	February 21, 2020	January 20, 2021
Executive Secretary of the National Security Council	Matthias Mitman	October 2019	January 20, 2021
Legal Advisor to the National Security Council	John Eisenberg	January 20, 2017	January 20, 2021
White House Director of Political Affairs	Brian Jack	February 2, 2019	January 20, 2021
White House Deputy Director of Political Affairs for Outreach	Alexander Willette	TBA	January 20, 2021
Director of the White House Presidential Personnel Office	John McEntee	January 8, 2019	January 20, 2021
Director of Operations of the Office of Presidential Personnel	James Bacon	TBA	January 20, 2021
Director of the Office of Public Liaison	Timothy Pataki	February 2, 2019	
Deputy Director of the Office of Public Liaison	James Goyer	TBA	January 20, 2021
Deputy Director of the Office of Public Liaison	Jennifer S. Korn	TBA	January 20, 2021
Director of Scheduling and Advance	Robert Peede Jr.	TBA	January 20, 2021
Deputy Assistant to the President and Director of Advance	Matthew Palmisano	TBA	January 20, 2021
Deputy Assistant to the President and Director of Scheduling	Vacant	TBA	January 20, 2021
Deputy Director of the Office of American Innovation	Ja'Ron K. Smith	TBA	January 20, 2021
White House Staff Secretary	Derek Lyons	June 6, 2018	January 20, 2021
White House Deputy Staff Secretary	Catherine Bellah Keller	June 9, 2018	January 20, 2021
Director of the Office of Trade and Manufacturing Policy	Peter Navarro	April 29, 2017	January 20, 2021
Special Assistant to the President for Trade and Manufacturing Policy	Alexander Gray	January 20, 2017	January 20, 2021
Deputy Director of Trade and Manufacturing Policy	Catherine A. Cole	TBA	January 20, 2021
White House Counsel	Pat Cipollone	December 10, 2018	January 20, 2021
Deputy Counsel to the President	Patrick F. Philbin	TBA	January 20, 2021
Deputy Counsel to the President	Michael M. Purpura	TBA	January 20, 2021
Deputy Counsel to the President	Kathryn C. Todd	TBA	January 20, 2021
Chief of Staff to the White House Counsel	Ann M. Donaldson	TBA	January 20, 2021
Director of Oval Office Operations	Nicholas F. Luna	TBA	January 20, 2021
Executive Assistant to the President	Molly A. Michael	TBA	January 20, 2021
Deputy Assistant to the President for Operations and Personal Aide to the President	Nicholas F. Luna	February 2, 2019. Previously Special Assistant to the President for Operations and Advance.	January 20, 2021
Oval Office Operations Coordinator	Molly A. Michael	TBA	January 20, 2021
Member of the President's Commission on White House Fellowships	Mike Duncan	May 2017	January 20, 2021
Member of the President's Commission on White House Fellowships	Aldona Wos	May 2017	January 20, 2021
Member of the President's Commission on White House Fellowships	Lee H. Bienstock	May 2017	January 20, 2021
Member of the President's Commission on White House Fellowships	Somers White Farkas	May 2017	January 20, 2021
Member of the President's Commission on White House Fellowships	Marlyn McGrath	May 2017	January 20, 2021
Member of the President's Commission on White House Fellowships	Damond R. Watkins	May 2017	January 20, 2021
Member of the President's Commission on White House Fellowships	Ronald J. Zlatoper	May 2017	January 20, 2021
Member of the President's Commission on White House Fellowships	Richard Bagger	May 2017	January 20, 2021
Member of the President's Commission on White House Fellowships	Kenneth R. Nahigian	June 2017	January 20, 2021
Member of the President's Commission on White House Fellowships	Richard F. Hohlt	June 2017	January 20, 2021
Member of the President's Commission on White House Fellowships	Paris Dennard	December 2017	January 20, 2021
Member of the President's Commission on White House Fellowships	Linda M. Springer	December 2017	January 20, 2021
Member of the President's Commission on White House Fellowships	Robert J. Smullen	December 2017	January 20, 2021
Member of the President's Commission on White House Fellowships	Daniel Caine	December 2017	January 20, 2021
Member of the President's Commission on White House Fellowships	Lisa Nelson	April 2018	January 20, 2021
Member of the President's Commission on White House Fellowships	Philip Montante	April 2018	January 20, 2021
Member of the President's Commission on White House Fellowships	Justin Sayfie	April 2018	January 20, 2021
Member of the President's Commission on White House Fellowships	Ryan E. Mackenzie	October 2019	January 20, 2021
Member of the President's Commission on White House Fellowships	John DeStefano	October 2019	January 20, 2021
Member of the President's Commission on White House Fellowships	Barrett Karr	October 2019	January 20, 2021
Member of the President's Commission on White House Fellowships	David Bohigian	December 2019	January 20, 2021
Member of the President's Commission on White House Fellowships	Justin Reilly Clark	February 2020	January 20, 2021
Member of the President's Commission on White House Fellowships	Josh Pitcock	February 2020	January 20, 2021
Member of the President's Commission on White House Fellowships	Reinhold Priebus	February 2020	January 20, 2021
Member of the President's Commission on White House Fellowships	Sean Michael Spicer	February 2020	
Deputy Assistant to the President	Keith Davids	September 6, 2018	
Director of the White House Military Office	Keith Davids	September 6, 2018	
Physician to the President	Sean Conley	May 4, 2018	January 20, 2021
Chief Official White House Photographer	Shealah Craighead	January 22, 2017	January 20, 2021
White House Chief Usher	Timothy Harleth	June 23, 2017	January 20, 2021

=== Council of Economic Advisers ===
Office	Nominee	Assumed office	Left office
Chairman of the Council of Economic Advisers	Tyler Goodspeed	June 24, 2020	January 7, 2021
Member of the Council of Economic Advisers	Vacant		

=== Council on Environmental Quality ===
Office	Nominee	Assumed office	Left office
Chair of the Council on Environmental Quality	Mary Neumayr	January 10, 2019 (Confirmed January 2, 2019, voice vote)	January 20, 2021
Member of the Council on Environmental Quality	Vacant		
Member of the Council on Environmental Quality	Vacant		

=== President's Intelligence Advisory Board ===
Office	Nominee	Assumed office	Left office
Chair of the President's Intelligence Advisory Board	Steve Feinberg	May 12, 2018	
Vice Chair of the President's Intelligence Advisory Board	Samantha F. Ravich	August 2018	
Member of the President's Intelligence Advisory Board	Saxby Chambliss	November 2018	
Member of the President's Intelligence Advisory Board	Jeremy Katz	November 2018	
Member of the President's Intelligence Advisory Board	Jim Donovan	November 2018	
Member of the President's Intelligence Advisory Board	Kevin E. Hulbert	November 2018	
Member of the President's Intelligence Advisory Board	David Robertson	November 2018	
Member of the President's Intelligence Advisory Board	Clifford Sobel	January 2019	
Member of the President's Intelligence Advisory Board	J. Tucker Bailey	March 2019	

=== Office of Management and Budget ===
Office	Nominee	Assumed office	Left office
Director of the Office of Management and Budget	Russell Vought	January 2, 2019	July 22, 2020
Director of the Office of Management and Budget	Russell Vought	January 2, 2019 (Confirmed July 20, 2020, 51–45)	January 20, 2021
Deputy Director of the Office of Management and Budget	Derek Kan	July 30, 2020 (Confirmed July 30, 2020, 71–21)	December 2020
Deputy Director of the Office of Management and Budget (Management)	Margaret Weichert	February 28, 2018 (Confirmed February 14, 2018, voice vote)	March 25, 2020
Administrator of the Office of Electronic Government	Vacant		
General Counsel for the Office of Management and Budget	Mark Paoletta	January 2018	January 20, 2021
Intellectual Property Enforcement Coordinator	Vishal Amin	August 3, 2017 (Confirmed August 3, 2017, voice vote)	
Controller of the Office of Federal Financial Management	David Mader		
Administrator of the Office of Information and Regulatory Affairs	Paul J. Ray	January 2020 (Confirmed January 9, 2020, 50–44)	
Office of Federal Procurement Policy
Administrator for Federal Procurement Policy	Michael E. Wooten	TBD (Confirmed August 1, 2019, voice vote)	

=== Office of National Drug Control Policy ===
Office	Nominee	Assumed office	Left office
Director of the Office of National Drug Control Policy	James W. Carroll	February 9, 2018	January 30, 2019
Director of the Office of National Drug Control Policy	James W. Carroll	January 31, 2019 (Confirmed January 2, 2019, voice vote)	January 20, 2021
Deputy Director of the Office of National Drug Control Policy	Kendel Ehrlich	August 2019	February 2020

=== Office of Science and Technology Policy ===
Office	Nominee	Assumed office	Left office
Director of the Office of Science and Technology Policy	Kelvin Droegemeier	February 11, 2019 (Confirmed January 2, 2019, voice vote)	January 15, 2021
Associate Director of the Office of Science and Technology Policy	Michael Kratsios	August 2, 2019 (Confirmed August 1, 2019, voice vote)	January 20, 2021
Associate Director of the Office of Science and Technology Policy	Vacant		
Associate Director of the Office of Science and Technology Policy	Vacant		
Associate Director of the Office of Science and Technology Policy	Vacant		

=== Office of the United States Trade Representative ===
Office	Nominee	Assumed office	Left office
Trade Representative	Robert Lighthizer	May 15, 2017 (Confirmed May 15, 2017, 82–14)	January 20, 2021
Deputy Trade Representative	Vacant		
Deputy Trade Representative	C.J. Mahoney	March 13, 2018 (Confirmed March 1, 2018, voice vote)	2020
Deputy Trade Representative	Michael Nemelka	September 8, 2020	
Deputy Trade Representative	Dennis Shea	March 12, 2018 (Confirmed March 1, 2018, voice vote)	
Chief Agricultural Negotiator	Gregg Doud	March 12, 2018 (Confirmed March 1, 2018, voice vote)	
General Counsel	Stephen Vaughn	March 2017	
Member of the Advisory Committee for Trade Policy and Negotiations	Dan DiMicco	December 4, 2017	
Member of the Advisory Committee for Trade Policy and Negotiations	Vincent Duvall	December 4, 2017	
Member of the Advisory Committee for Trade Policy and Negotiations	Leslie B. Daniels	December 4, 2017	
Member of the Advisory Committee for Trade Policy and Negotiations	Donald N. Bockoven Jr.	September 2018	
Member of the Advisory Committee for Trade Policy and Negotiations	Donald Smith	September 2018	
Member of the Advisory Committee for Trade Policy and Negotiations	Lee Styslinger III	September 2018	
Member of the Advisory Committee for Trade Policy and Negotiations	Kenneth R. Weinstein	September 2018	
Member of the Advisory Committee for Trade Policy and Negotiations	Charles Rivkin	September 2018	
Member of the Advisory Committee for Trade Policy and Negotiations	Victoria Espinel	September 2018	
Member of the Advisory Committee for Trade Policy and Negotiations	Robert T. DeMartini	September 2018	
Member of the Advisory Committee for Trade Policy and Negotiations	C. Fred Bergsten	October 2018	
Member of the Advisory Committee for Trade Policy and Negotiations	Evan G. Greenberg	October 2018	
Member of the Advisory Committee for Trade Policy and Negotiations	James P. Hoffa	October 2018	
Member of the Advisory Committee for Trade Policy and Negotiations	Harold McGraw III	October 2018	
Member of the Advisory Committee for Trade Policy and Negotiations	Timothy P. Smucker	October 2018	
Member of the Advisory Committee for Trade Policy and Negotiations	Pete Ricketts	December 2011	

=== Office of the Vice President ===
Office	Nominee	Assumed office	Left office
Chief of Staff to the Vice President	Marc Short	March 2019	January 20, 2021
Senior Advisor to the Vice President	Thomas A. Rose		January 20, 2021
Deputy Assistant to the Vice President	Kara Brooks	January 25, 2017	January 20, 2021
Communications Director for the Second Lady	Kara Brooks	January 25, 2017	January 20, 2021
Deputy Assistant to the Vice President	Sara Egeland	January 25, 2017	January 20, 2021
Policy Director for the Second Lady	Sara Egeland	January 25, 2017	January 20, 2021
Deputy Assistant to the Vice President (External Affairs)	Lani Czarnieck	January 25, 2017	January 20, 2021
Special Assistant to the Vice President	Zach Bauer	January 25, 2017	January 20, 2021
Director of Administration for the Vice President	Katherine Purucke		January 20, 2021
Director of Domestic Policy for the Vice President	Daris Meeks	January 25, 2017	January 20, 2021
Director of Legislative Affairs for the Vice President	Jonathan Hiler	January 25, 2017	January 20, 2021
Director of Public Liaison and Intergovernmental Affairs for the Vice President	Sarah Makin	January 25, 2017	January 20, 2021
Deputy Director of Public Liaison and Intergovernmental Affairs for the Vice President	Andeliz Castillo	January 25, 2017	January 20, 2021
Director of Scheduling for the Vice President	Meghan Patenaude	January 25, 2017	January 20, 2021
Director of Speechwriting for the Vice President	Stephen Ford	January 25, 2017	January 20, 2021
National Security Advisor to the Vice President	Keith Kellogg	April 27, 2018	January 20, 2021
Press Secretary to the Vice President	Katie Miller	October 1, 2019	March 27, 2020
Deputy Press Secretary to the Vice President	Josh Paciorek	March 2017	January 20, 2021
Chief Counsel to the Vice President	Matt Morgan	January 8, 2018	January 20, 2021
Chief of Staff to the Second Lady	Jana Toner	January 2018	January 20, 2021

==== Previous officeholders ====
Office	Name	Took office	Left office	Notes
Chief of Staff to the Vice President	Josh Pitcock	January 22, 2017	July 28, 2017	
Chief of Staff to the Vice President	Nick Ayers	July 28, 2017	December 31, 2018	Ayers tweeted on December 8 that he would be departing at the end of the year.
Deputy Chief of Staff to the Vice President	Jen Pavlik	January 22, 2017	September 2017	
Director of Communications to the Vice President	Jarrod Agen	January 2017	June 2019	
Press Secretary to the Vice President	Marc Lotter	January 22, 2017	October 2017	
Press Secretary to the Vice President	Alyssa Farah	October 2017	August 31, 2019	Resigned to become the Pentagon Press Secretary.
Deputy Staff Secretary to the Vice President	Francis J. Brooke			Resigned to become Special Assistant to the President for Economic Policy.
Associate Director of Domestic Policy for the Vice President	Francis J. Brooke			Resigned to become Special Assistant to the President for Economic Policy.
National Security Advisor to the Vice President	Andrea L. Thompson	January 26, 2017	September 11, 2017	
Deputy National Security Advisor to the Vice President	Joan Virginia O'Hara			
Special Advisor to the Vice President on European and Russian Affairs	Jennifer Williams	April 2019	February 3, 2020	Williams returned to the State Dept. Her next assignment will be with CENTCOM.
Special Advisor to the Vice President on Homeland Security and Counterterrorism	Olivia Troye	2018	July 2020	Troye is a member of the Republican Political Alliance for Integrity and Reform.

=== Miscellaneous ===
Office	Nominee	Assumed office	Left office
Morris K. Udall and Stewart L. Udall Foundation
Member of the Board of Trustees of the Morris K. Udall and Stewart L. Udall Foundation	Tadd M. Johnson	December 27, 2017 (Confirmed December 21, 2017, voice vote)	
Member of the Board of Trustees of the Morris K. Udall and Stewart L. Udall Foundation	Lisa Johnson Billy	December 27, 2017 (Confirmed December 21, 2017, voice vote)	
Woodrow Wilson International Center for Scholars
Chair of the Board of Trustees of the Woodrow Wilson International Center for Scholars	Scott Walker	July 2019	
Vice Chair of the Board of Trustees of the Woodrow Wilson International Center for Scholars	Drew Maloney	July 2019 (Appointed Member of the Board March 2019)	

=== Member of the Gulf Coast Ecosystem Restoration Council ===
Office	Nominee	Assumed office	Left office
Member of the Gulf Coast Ecosystem Restoration Council	Greg Abbott	January 20, 2015	
Member of the Gulf Coast Ecosystem Restoration Council	Ron DeSantis	January 8, 2019	
Member of the Gulf Coast Ecosystem Restoration Council	John Bel Edwards	January 11, 2016	
Member of the Gulf Coast Ecosystem Restoration Council	Kay Ivey	April 10, 2017	
Member of the Gulf Coast Ecosystem Restoration Council	Tate Reeves	January 14, 2020	

=== Member of the Council of Governors ===
Office	Nominee	Assumed office	Left office
Member of the Council of Governors	Steve Bullock	Reappointment (Tenure began February 24, 2015)	
Member of the Council of Governors	Asa Hutchinson	July 12, 2018	
Member of the Council of Governors	Mike DeWine	February 22, 2019	
Member of the Council of Governors	Doug Ducey	February 22, 2019	
Member of the Council of Governors	David Ige	February 22, 2019	
Member of the Council of Governors	Ned Lamont	February 22, 2019	
Member of the Council of Governors	Mike Parson	February 22, 2019	
Member of the Council of Governors	J. B. Pritzker	February 22, 2019	
Member of the Council of Governors	Pete Ricketts	February 22, 2019	
Member of the Council of Governors	Tim Walz	February 22, 2019	

=== Commission on Presidential Scholars ===
Office	Nominee	Assumed office	Left office
Chairman of the Commission on Presidential Scholars	Eileen Lappin Weiser		
Member of the Commission on Presidential Scholars	Donald Wuerl		
Member of the Commission on Presidential Scholars	Tina S. Holland		
Member of the Commission on Presidential Scholars	Sally Atwater		
Member of the Commission on Presidential Scholars	Darla Romfo	June 2018	

=== The Alyce Spotted Bear and Walter Soboleff Commission on Native Children ===
Office	Nominee	Assumed office	Left office
Member of the Alyce Spotted Bear and Walter Soboleff Commission on Native Children	Jesse Delmar	January 2018	

=== President's Board of Advisors on Historically Black Colleges and Universities ===
Office	Nominee	Assumed office	Left office
Chairman of the President's Board of Advisors on Historically Black Colleges and Universities	Johnny C. Taylor Jr.	February 2018	
Member of the President's Board of Advisors on Historically Black Colleges and Universities	Aminta H. Breaux	September 2018	
Member of the President's Board of Advisors on Historically Black Colleges and Universities	James E. Clark	September 2018	
Member of the President's Board of Advisors on Historically Black Colleges and Universities	Phyllis Dawkins	September 2018	
Member of the President's Board of Advisors on Historically Black Colleges and Universities	Rodney A. Ellis	September 2018	
Member of the President's Board of Advisors on Historically Black Colleges and Universities	Marshall C. Grigsby	September 2018	
Member of the President's Board of Advisors on Historically Black Colleges and Universities	Billy C. Hawkins	September 2018	
Member of the President's Board of Advisors on Historically Black Colleges and Universities	Jerry M. Hunter	September 2018	
Member of the President's Board of Advisors on Historically Black Colleges and Universities	Nick Justice	September 2018	
Member of the President's Board of Advisors on Historically Black Colleges and Universities	Ronald A. Johnson	September 2018	
Member of the President's Board of Advisors on Historically Black Colleges and Universities	Harold L. Martin	September 2018	
Member of the President's Board of Advisors on Historically Black Colleges and Universities	Bernard J. Milano	September 2018	
Member of the President's Board of Advisors on Historically Black Colleges and Universities	Connie Rath	September 2018	
Member of the President's Board of Advisors on Historically Black Colleges and Universities	Kevin Wilson Williams	September 2018	

=== President's Committee for People with Intellectual Disabilities ===
Office	Nominee	Assumed office	Left office
Member of the President's Committee for People with Intellectual Disabilities	Emily Colson	April 2018	
Member of the President's Committee for People with Intellectual Disabilities	Olegario D. Cantos VII	April 2018	
Member of the President's Committee for People with Intellectual Disabilities	Claudia Horn	April 2018	
Member of the President's Committee for People with Intellectual Disabilities	Stephanie Hubach	April 2018	
Member of the President's Committee for People with Intellectual Disabilities	Annette Liike	April 2018	
Member of the President's Committee for People with Intellectual Disabilities	Vijayalakshmi Appareddy	April 2018	
Member of the President's Committee for People with Intellectual Disabilities	Karen Moderow	April 2018	
Member of the President's Committee for People with Intellectual Disabilities	Christopher Glenn Neeley	April 2018	

=== White House Initiative on Asian Americans and Pacific Islanders ===
Office	Nominee	Assumed office	Left office
Co-chair of the President's Advisory Commission on Asian Americans and Pacific Islanders	Michelle Steel	January 2019	
Co-chair of the President's Advisory Commission on Asian Americans and Pacific Islanders	Paul Hsu	January 2019	
Member of the President's Advisory Commission on Asian Americans and Pacific Islanders	Jennifer Carnahan	January 2019	
Member of the President's Advisory Commission on Asian Americans and Pacific Islanders	David B. Cohen	January 2019	
Member of the President's Advisory Commission on Asian Americans and Pacific Islanders	Grace Y. Lee	January 2019	
Member of the President's Advisory Commission on Asian Americans and Pacific Islanders	George Leing	January 2019	
Member of the President's Advisory Commission on Asian Americans and Pacific Islanders	Jan-Ie Low	January 2019	
Member of the President's Advisory Commission on Asian Americans and Pacific Islanders	Herman Martir	January 2019	
Member of the President's Advisory Commission on Asian Americans and Pacific Islanders	Prem Parameswaran	January 2019	
Member of the President's Advisory Commission on Asian Americans and Pacific Islanders	Amata Coleman Radewagen	January 2019	
Member of the President's Advisory Commission on Asian Americans and Pacific Islanders	Sean Reyes	January 2019	
Member of the President's Advisory Commission on Asian Americans and Pacific Islanders	Chiling Tong	January 2019	

=== Federal Service Impasses Panel ===
Office	Nominee	Assumed office	Left office
Member of the Federal Service Impasses Panel	Mark A. Carter	July 2017 (Five year term ending on January 10, 2022)	
Member of the Federal Service Impasses Panel	Andrea Fischer Newman	July 2017 (Five year term ending on January 10, 2022)	
Member of the Federal Service Impasses Panel	David R. Osborne	July 2017 (Five year term ending on January 10, 2022)	
Member of the Federal Service Impasses Panel	Karen Czarnecki	July 2017 (Five year term ending on January 10, 2022)	
Member of the Federal Service Impasses Panel	Donald Todd	July 2017 (Five year term ending on January 10, 2022)	
Member of the Federal Service Impasses Panel	Jonathan Riches	July 2017 (Five year term ending on January 10, 2022)	
Member of the Federal Service Impasses Panel	F. Vincent Vernuccio	July 2017 (Five year term ending on January 10, 2022)	

=== National Women's Business Council ===
Office	Nominee	Assumed office	Left office
Chairperson of the National Women's Business Council	Liz Sara	July 2018	

=== United States Government Activities to Combat Malaria Globally ===
Office	Nominee	Assumed office	Left office
Member of the Board of Trustees of the James Madison Memorial Fellowship Foundation	Terrence Berg	December 2017	
Member of the Board of Trustees of the James Madison Memorial Fellowship Foundation	Diane S. Sykes	December 2017	
Coordinator of United States Government Activities to Combat Malaria Globally	Kenneth William Staley	December 2017	

== Previous officeholders ==
Office	Name	Took office	Left office	Notes
White House Chief of Staff	Reince Priebus	January 20, 2017	July 31, 2017	His tenure may be considered the shortest in the office's history, excluding interim appointments, if James Baker's separate tenures as Chief of Staff under two different presidents (Ronald Reagan and George H. W. Bush) are combined (Baker served only 150 days as Bush's Chief of Staff).
White House Chief of Staff	John F. Kelly	July 31, 2017	January 2, 2019	President Trump announced that General Kelly would be leaving at the end of 2018. Kelly commented, "The vast majority of people who worked in the White House were decent people who were doing the best they could to serve the nation. They’ve unfortunately paid quite a price for that in reputation and future employment. They don’t deserve that. They deserve better than that, because they kept the train from careening off the tracks. The climate—the work environment—is always set by the boss. And people, generally speaking, endured it as long as they could. Until they couldn’t."
White House Chief of Staff	Mick Mulvaney	January 2, 2019	March 30, 2020	After leaving his role as White House Chief of Staff, Mulvaney served as Special Envoy for Northern Ireland beginning on May 1, 2020. He called Secretary of State Mike Pompeo on the evening of January 6, 2021, to inform him of his resignation from the role of Special Envoy.
Director of the Office of Management and Budget	Mick Mulvaney	February 16, 2017	March 31, 2020	
Deputy Director of the Office of Management and Budget	Russell Vought	March 14, 2018	July 22, 2020	Vought performed the functions of OMB Director while Mulvaney was Acting Chief of Staff, and continued as acting director thereafter. The Senate confirmed Vought as OMB Director on July 20, 2020.
White House Deputy Chief of Staff (Implementation)	Katie Walsh	January 20, 2017	March 30, 2017	Moving to "Trump's outside political group" America First Policies.
White House Principal Deputy Chief of Staff	Katie Walsh	January 20, 2017	March 30, 2017	Moving to "Trump's outside political group" America First Policies.
White House Principal Deputy Chief of Staff	Kirstjen Nielsen	September 6, 2017	December 6, 2017	Left to become United States Secretary of Homeland Security.
White House Principal Deputy Chief of Staff	James W. Carroll	December 6, 2017	February 9, 2018	Left to become acting director of the U.S. Office of National Drug Control Policy.
White House Principal Deputy Chief of Staff	Zachary Fuentes	June 6, 2018	January 2, 2019	
White House Deputy Chief of Staff (Operations)	Joe Hagin	January 20, 2017	July 6, 2018	
White House Deputy Chief of Staff (Operations)	Daniel Walsh	July 6, 2018	November 26, 2019	
Director of the White House Military Office	Daniel Walsh	September 6, 2017	July 2018	
White House Deputy Chief of Staff (Policy)	Rick Dearborn	January 20, 2017	March 16, 2018	Formerly the executive director of Trump's presidential transition team, he was a Deputy Chief of Staff until resigning in March 2018, reportedly to seek a job in the private sector.
Special Assistant to the Chief of Staff	Carrie Bock	January 2017	April 2017	
Associate Director of Presidential Personnel	Carrie Bock	May 1, 2017	September 2018	
Director of the Office of Chief of Staff	Michael Ambrosini	January 22, 2017	September 2017	
Director of the Office of Chief of Staff	Emily Mallon	August 2017	March 2019	
Senior Counselor to the President	Steve Bannon	January 20, 2017	August 18, 2017	Returned to Breitbart News. Per some sources, White House Chief of Staff John F. Kelly asked for his immediate resignation on August 18. Bannon said he submitted a two-week resignation notice on August 4.
White House Chief Strategist	Steve Bannon	January 20, 2017	August 18, 2017	Returned to Breitbart News. Per some sources, White House Chief of Staff John F. Kelly asked for his immediate resignation on August 18. Bannon said he submitted a two-week resignation notice on August 4.
Counselor to the President	Kellyanne Conway	January 20, 2017	August 31, 2020	Also, Conway's husband George Conway left the Lincoln Project.
Counselor to the President	Johnny DeStefano	February 9, 2018	May 24, 2019	Oversaw the Offices of Intergovernmental Affairs, Presidential Personnel, Political Affairs, and Public Liaison. Became a consultant for Juul.
Director of the Office of Public Liaison	Johnny DeStefano	September 25, 2017	February 9, 2018	Oversaw the Offices of Intergovernmental Affairs, Presidential Personnel, Political Affairs, and Public Liaison. Became a consultant for Juul.
Director of the Office of Public Liaison	Johnny DeStefano	February 9, 2018	March 18, 2018	Oversaw the Offices of Intergovernmental Affairs, Presidential Personnel, Political Affairs, and Public Liaison. Became a consultant for Juul.
White House Director of Presidential Personnel	Johnny DeStefano	January 20, 2017	January 2018	Oversaw the Offices of Intergovernmental Affairs, Presidential Personnel, Political Affairs, and Public Liaison. Became a consultant for Juul.
White House Director of Presidential Personnel	Sean Doocey	January 2018	February 2020	
Advisor to the President (Domestic Policy)	Kara McKee	January 20, 2017	August 1, 2018	
Special Advisor to the President (COVID-19)	Scott Atlas	August 10, 2020	November 30, 2020	In September 2020, 78 of Atlas's former colleagues at the Stanford Medical School signed an open letter criticizing Atlas, writing that he had made "falsehoods and misrepresentations of science" that "run counter to established science" and "undermine public health authorities and the credible science that guides effective public health policy." Atlas resigned days before the end of the maximum 130-day period in which he could serve with "special government employee" status.
Assistant to the President and Director of the Domestic Policy Council	Andrew Bremberg	January 20, 2017	February 2, 2019	Became Representative of the United States to the European Office of the United Nations.
Assistant to the President and Director of the Domestic Policy Council	Joe Grogan	February 2, 2019	May 24, 2020	
Special Advisor for Human Trafficking	Heather C. Fischer	June 8, 2020	September 31, 2020	
Senior Counselor to the President (Economic Initiatives)	Dina Powell	January 22, 2017	January 12, 2018	
Deputy National Security Advisor (Strategy)	Dina Powell	March 15, 2017	January 12, 2018	
Deputy National Security Advisor (Strategy)	Nadia Schadlow	January 21, 2018	April 27, 2018	
White House Cabinet Secretary	Bill McGinley	January 20, 2017	July 2019	
White House Deputy Cabinet Secretary	John Mashburn	January 20, 2017	mid-April 2018	Became a senior advisor to secretary of the Department of Energy Rick Perry.
Special Advisor to the President on Regulatory Reform	Carl Icahn	January 20, 2017	August 18, 2017	Left amid concerns of conflicts of interest.
Assistant to the President (Intergovernmental and Technology Initiatives)	Reed Cordish	January 20, 2017	February 16, 2018	Stated he never planned to stay with the administration for more than a year and that his policy role was complete.
Deputy Assistant to the President	Sebastian Gorka	January 20, 2017	August 25, 2017	Failed to obtain the security clearance necessary for work on national security issues.
Deputy Assistant to the President	Carlos Díaz-Rosillo	January 20, 2017	June 19, 2018	Left to work at the National Endowment for the Humanities as Senior Deputy Chairman.
Deputy Assistant to the President	Sean Cairncross	January 20, 2017	June 2019	
Deputy Assistant to the President	Ira Greenstein	February 1, 2017	March 30, 2018	
Deputy Assistant to the President (Domestic Policy)	Lance Leggitt	February 9, 2018		
Deputy Assistant to the President (Strategic Communications)	Michael Anton	February 8, 2017	April 8, 2018	
Special Assistant to the President	Andrew Surabian	January 2017	September 5, 2017	
Special Assistant to the President	Reagan Thompson	January 2018 (Appointed by Melania Trump)	July 2018	
Director of Policy for the First Lady	Reagan Thompson	January 2018 (Appointed by Melania Trump)	July 2018	
Chief of Staff to the First Lady	Lindsay Reynolds	February 1, 2017	April 2020	Resigned to spend time with her family.
Chief of Staff to the First Lady	Stephanie Grisham	April 7, 2020	January 6, 2021	Resigned following the 2021 attack on the U.S. Capitol.
Special Assistant to the President	Chris Herndon	January 23, 2017	December 2018	
White House Director of Information Technology	Chris Herndon	January 23, 2017	December 2018	
Special Assistant to the President (Agriculture, Trade and Food Assistance)	Ray Starling	February 2017	May 2018	Left to become USDA Chief of Staff.
Special Assistant to the President (Domestic Energy and Environmental Policy)	Michael Catanzaro	February 2017	April 2018	
Special Assistant to the President (International Energy and Environment Policy)	George David Banks	February 2017	February 14, 2018	Resigned after learning he would not be able to obtain a security clearance due to past marijuana use.
Special Assistant to the President (Legislative Affairs)	Ben Howard	January 2017	January 2018	
Special Assistant to the President (Legislative Affairs)	Cindy Simms	February 2017	March 2018	
Special Assistant to the President (Office of Communications)	Cliff Sims	January 2017	May 2018	
Special Assistant to the President (Office of Communications)	Kelly Sadler	May 2017	June 2018	Mocked Senator John McCain in a May 2018 closed-door meeting in front of two dozen other staffers.
Special Assistant to the President (Technology, Telecom, and Cyber-Security Policy)	Grace Koh	February 23, 2017	March 2018	Left to join the private law firm DLA Piper.
National Security Advisor	Michael Flynn	January 20, 2017	February 13, 2017	Resigned after misleading Vice President Mike Pence about the nature and content of his communications with Ambassador Sergey Kislyak. His tenure was the shortest in the office's history.
National Security Advisor	H. R. McMaster	February 20, 2017	April 9, 2018	McMaster was criticized in August 2017 after he fired several National Security Council staff members, but Trump affirmed his confidence in McMaster. On March 15, 2018, it was reported that Trump had decided to dismiss McMaster at a later, unspecified date. McMaster resigned as National Security Advisor on March 22, 2018, effective April 9. In 2024 McMaster wrote a book critical of Trump.
National Security Advisor	John Bolton	April 9, 2018	September 10, 2019	Resigned amid disagreements within the Trump administration on Korea, Iran and Afghanistan policy.
Deputy National Security Advisor	K. T. McFarland	February 20, 2017	May 19, 2017	Reported not to be a good fit at the NSC, she resigned after less than four months. Trump nominated her to be United States Ambassador to Singapore, but her nomination stalled and was withdrawn.
Deputy National Security Advisor	Ricky L. Waddell	May 19, 2017	May 15, 2018	
Deputy National Security Advisor	Mira Ricardel	May 15, 2018	November 14, 2018	Left after reported disputes with Defense Secretary James Mattis and First Lady Melania Trump.
Deputy National Security Advisor	Charles Kupperman	January 11, 2019	September 22, 2019	Acting National Security Advisor from September 10, 2019, until the appointment of Robert O'Brien on September 18, 2019.
Deputy National Security Advisor	Matthew Pottinger	September 22, 2019	January 6, 2021	Resigned following the 2021 attack on the U.S. Capitol.
Senior Director for Asian Affairs of the National Security Council	Matthew Pottinger	January 20, 2017	September 22, 2019	Became Deputy National Security Advisor.
Deputy National Security Advisor for Middle East and North African Affairs	Victoria Coates	October 10, 2019	February 20, 2020	Reassigned to Energy Department after rumors that she was the author of an anonymous op-ed criticizing Trump.
Homeland Security Advisor	Tom Bossert	January 20, 2017	April 10, 2018	His resignation came after John R. Bolton was announced as National Security Adviser, indicating Bolton's intentions to name his own people to supporting positions. Bossert had previously expressed interest in becoming involved in policy issues such as counterterrorism and cyberwarfare, but had spent much of his time as Homeland Security Advisor as the administration's face in dealing with hurricanes that affected Texas and Florida.
Homeland Security Advisor	Doug Fears	June 1, 2018	July 12, 2019	
Homeland Security Advisor	Peter J. Brown	July 12, 2019	February 7, 2020	Named Special Representative for Puerto Rico's Disaster Recovery.
Deputy Homeland Security Advisor	Rob Joyce	October 13, 2017	April 10, 2018	
National Security Advisor	Keith Kellogg	February 13, 2017	February 20, 2017	
Executive Secretary and Chief of Staff of the National Security Council	Keith Kellogg	January 20, 2017	April 27, 2018	
Executive Secretary and Chief of Staff of the National Security Council	Fred Fleitz	April 27, 2018	October 15, 2018	
Executive Secretary of the National Security Council	Joan Virginia O'Hara	November 19, 2018	October 11, 2019	
Director of Strategic Planning of the National Security Council	Rich Higgins	January 20, 2017	July 21, 2017	
Deputy Chief of Staff for the National Security Council	Tera Dahl	January 20, 2017	July 6, 2017	
Senior Director for Strategic Communications and Spokesperson for the National Security Council	Garrett Marquis	May 29, 2018	September 11, 2019	
Senior Director for Intelligence Programs of the National Security Council	Ezra Cohen-Watnick	January 2017	August 2, 2017	
Senior Director for Intelligence Programs of the National Security Council	Michael Barry	October 2017	July 2018	
Senior Director for Intelligence Programs of the National Security Council	Michael Ellis	March 2, 2020	November 2020	Ellis reviewed the book The Room Where It Happened by John Bolton before its publication. On January 19, 2021, Ellis became NSA General Counsel, a career position that could continue into the Biden administration. On January 20, he was put on administrative leave pending a review of his appointment.
Senior Director for Western Hemisphere Affairs of the National Security Council	Craig Deare	January 20, 2017	February 18, 2017	
Senior Director for Western Hemisphere Affairs of the National Security Council	Juan Cruz	May 11, 2017	August 2018	
Senior Director for European and Russian Affairs of the National Security Council	Fiona Hill	April 2017	June 2019	Both Hill and Morrison were witnesses in the impeachment inquiry.
Senior Director for European and Russian Affairs of the National Security Council	Tim Morrison	August 2019	October 31, 2019	
Senior Director for European and Russian Affairs of the National Security Council	Andrew Peek	November 1, 2019	January 19, 2020	Was placed on administrative leave following a security-related investigation and did not return to the role.
Senior Director for European and Russian Affairs of the National Security Council	Tom Williams	January 20, 2020	June 18, 2020	
Senior Director for European and Russian Affairs of the National Security Council	Ryan Tully		January 6, 2021	Resigned following the 2021 attack on the U.S. Capitol.
Director for European Affairs of the National Security Council	Alexander Vindman	July 2018	February 7, 2020	Vindman and his twin brother Eugene, also an Army Lieutenant Colonel and an ethics lawyer, were removed from the NSC two days after Trump's impeachment acquittal.
Senior Director for Middle East and North African Affairs of the National Security Council	Derek Harvey	January 27, 2017	July 27, 2017	
Senior Director for Middle East and North African Affairs of the National Security Council	Rob Greenway	May 2017	January 7, 2021	Resigned following the 2021 attack on the U.S. Capitol.
Senior Director for African Affairs of the National Security Council	Robin Townley	January 20, 2017	February 10, 2017	Denied a critical security clearance by the CIA.
Senior Director for African Affairs of the National Security Council	Cyril Sartor	August 3, 2017	June 2019	
Senior Director for African Affairs of the National Security Council	Erin Walsh	July 2019	January 7, 2021	Resigned following the 2021 attack on the U.S. Capitol.
Senior Director for Gulf Affairs of the National Security Council	Kirsten Fontenrose	March 15, 2018	November 16, 2018	
Senior Director for Global Health Security and Biodefense of the National Security Council	Tim Ziemer	April 2017	May 8, 2018	Ziemer was the White House's point man on global health crises. His duties were taken over by the Senior Director for Weapons of Mass Destruction and Biodefense.
Senior Director for International Organizations and Alliances of the National Security Council	Jennifer Arangio	January 2017	July 14, 2018	
Senior Director for Counterterrorism of the National Security Council	Kash Patel	August 6, 2019	February 19, 2020	Moved to be a senior advisor at the Office of the Director of National Intelligence upon Richard Grenell becoming acting DNI.
Senior Director for Defense Policy and Strategy of the National Security Council	Earl Matthews	July 14, 2018	November 7, 2019	
Senior Director for Defense Policy and Strategy of the National Security Council	Mark Vandroff	March 2020	January 7, 2021	Resigned following the 2021 attack on the U.S. Capitol.
Senior Director for Emerging Technologies of the National Security Council	William Happer	September 2018	September 11, 2019	
Director for Medical and Biodefense Preparedness Policy of the National Security Council	Luciana Borio	July 2017	May 2018	
Senior Director for Weapons of Mass Destruction of the National Security Council	Anthony Ruggiero	July 2, 2018	January 7, 2021	Resigned following the 2021 attack on the U.S. Capitol.
White House Staff Secretary	Rob Porter	January 20, 2017	February 7, 2018	Resigned his position as White House Staff Secretary after domestic abuse allegations from both of his former wives came to public attention.
White House Personal Secretary	Madeleine Westerhout	January 20, 2017	February 2, 2019	
Director of Oval Office Operations	Madeleine Westerhout	February 2, 2019	August 29, 2019	Fired after sharing details of Trump family matters and Oval Office operations with reporters.
White House Press Secretary	Sean Spicer	January 20, 2017	July 21, 2017	Announced his resignation July 21, 2017, although he remained at the White House in an unspecified capacity until August 31. His tenure was the sixth-shortest in the office's history. (Note: Excluding interim appointments. Also excludes James Brady, who was permanently disabled by a gunshot wound 69 days into his tenure, and George Stephanopoulos, who briefed the press during his tenure as Communications Director though the title formally belonged to Dee Dee Myers.)
White House Director of Communications	Sean Spicer	January 20, 2017	March 6, 2017	
White House Director of Communications	Sean Spicer	June 2, 2017	July 21, 2017	
White House Director of Communications	Michael Dubke	March 6, 2017	June 2, 2017	His tenure was the fourth-shortest in the office's history, excluding interim appointments.
White House Director of Communications	Anthony Scaramucci	July 25, 2017	July 31, 2017	His tenure was the shortest in the office's history, breaking the former record held by Jack Koehler. Scaramucci is a member of the Republican Political Alliance for Integrity and Reform.
White House Director of Communications	Hope Hicks	August 16, 2017	March 29, 2018	On February 27, 2018, Hicks told a Congressional committee that she had told "white lies" on Trump's behalf. The next day Hicks announced her intention to resign, effective March 29.
White House Director of Strategic Communications	Hope Hicks	January 20, 2017	September 12, 2017	
White House Director of Strategic Communications	Mercedes Schlapp	September 12, 2017	July 1, 2019	Pres. Trump tweeted that Schlapp would be joining his 2020 presidential campaign.
White House Director of Strategic Communications	Alyssa Farah	April 7, 2020	December 4, 2020	Resigned; "plans to start a consulting firm[;] ... had initially planned to leave before the election" per an anonymous source
White House Deputy Chief of Staff (Communications)	Bill Shine	July 5, 2018	March 8, 2019	Resigned to work for the Trump 2020 presidential campaign.
White House Director of Communications	Bill Shine	July 5, 2018	March 8, 2019	Resigned to work for the Trump 2020 presidential campaign.
White House Director of Communications	Stephanie Grisham	July 1, 2019	April 7, 2020	Grisham was the First Lady's Press Secretary and Communications Director. New Chief of Staff Mark Meadows removed her, and she returned to the East Wing to be the First Lady's Chief of Staff.
White House Press Secretary	Stephanie Grisham	July 1, 2019	April 7, 2020	Grisham was the First Lady's Press Secretary and Communications Director. New Chief of Staff Mark Meadows removed her, and she returned to the East Wing to be the First Lady's Chief of Staff.
White House Press Secretary	Sarah Huckabee Sanders	July 26, 2017	June 30, 2019	
White House Principal Deputy Press Secretary	Sarah Huckabee Sanders	January 22, 2017	July 26, 2017	Became White House Press Secretary.
Deputy Press Secretary	Lindsay Walters	January 22, 2017	April 13, 2019	
Deputy Press Secretary	Hogan Gidley	October 11, 2017	January 31, 2019	
Deputy Press Secretary	Sarah Matthews	June 2019	January 6, 2021	Resigned following the 2021 attack on the U.S. Capitol.
White House Deputy Director of Communications and Research	Raj Shah	January 20, 2017	September 12, 2017	
White House Principal Deputy Press Secretary	Raj Shah	September 12, 2017	January 14, 2019	
White House Deputy Director of Communications	Jessica Ditto	January 20, 2017	March 2019	
Assistant Communications Director for Surrogate Operations	Boris Epshteyn	January 22, 2017	March 25, 2017	
Deputy White House Communications Director	Josh Raffel	January 20, 2017	February 28, 2018	Resigned in order to move back to New York City because of "family obligations".
Deputy White House Communications Director	Adam Kennedy	November 2018	March 6, 2020	Kennedy held several staff positions from the start of the Trump administration through March 2020.
Senior White House Assistant Press Secretary	Michael Short	January 20, 2017	July 25, 2017	White House Communications Director Anthony Scaramucci stated his intent to fire Short in an interview with Politico on July 25, 2017. Short resigned later that day.
White House Director of Media Affairs	Helen Aguirre Ferré	January 23, 2017	August 2018	Resigned to become Director for Strategic Communications and Public Affairs for the National Endowment for the Arts.
White House Director of Advance	George Gigicos	January 22, 2017	July 31, 2017	
Deputy Director of the Domestic Policy Council	Paul Winfree	January 22, 2017	December 2017	
White House Director of Budget Policy	Paul Winfree	January 22, 2017	December 2017	
White House Director of Legislative Affairs	Marc Short	January 22, 2017	July 20, 2018	February 2019: Returned to White House as chief of staff for Vice President Mike Pence.
White House Director of Legislative Affairs	Shahira Knight	July 2018	June 17, 2019	Decided to depart as cooperation with Congress had taken a back seat to election politics.
Special Assistant to the President (Economic Policy)	Shahira Knight	January 20, 2017	July 2018	
White House Deputy Director of Legislative Affairs of Nominations	Mary Elizabeth Taylor	January 20, 2017	October 1, 2018	Became Assistant Secretary of State for Legislative Affairs.
Director of the National Economic Council	Gary Cohn	January 20, 2017	March 13, 2018	Announcement followed Trump's proposal to impose import tariffs on steel and aluminum, and Trump's cancellation of a meeting with end-users of steel and aluminium that Cohn had arranged in an attempt to dissuade the president from the planned tariffs.
Deputy Director of the National Economic Council for Economic Policy (Domestic Policy)	Jeremy Katz	January 22, 2017	January 2018	
Deputy Director of the National Economic Council for Economic Policy (Domestic Policy)	Andrew Olmem	July 2, 2018	June 19, 2020	
Deputy Director of the National Economic Council (International Policy)	Kenneth Juster	January 20, 2017	June 8, 2017	Became U.S. Ambassador to India.
Deputy Director of the National Economic Council (International Policy)	Everett Eissenstat	June 8, 2017	July 2, 2018	
Deputy Director of the National Economic Council (International Policy)	Clete Willems	July 2, 2018	March 22, 2019	
Deputy Director of the National Economic Council (International Policy)	Kelly Ann Shaw	March 22, 2019	October 25, 2019	
Director of the National Trade Council	Peter Navarro	January 22, 2017	April 29, 2017	
Director of the Office of Intergovernmental Affairs	Justin R. Clark	January 20, 2017	March 13, 2018	
Director of the Office of Public Liaison	George Sifakis	March 6, 2017	September 25, 2017	Left after less than seven months.
Director of the Office of Public Liaison	Justin R. Clark	March 18, 2018	December 7, 2018	
Director of the Office of Public Liaison	Steve Munisteri	December 7, 2018	February 2, 2019	
Deputy Director of the Office of Public Liaison	Steve Munisteri	February 14, 2017	February 2, 2019	
Director of Communications for the Office of Public Liaison	Omarosa	January 20, 2017	January 20, 2018	Resignation was announced December 13, 2017. It was reported that White House Chief of Staff John F. Kelly fired Newman, but Newman disputed the account, stating that she resigned.
Director of Oval Office Operations	Keith Schiller	January 20, 2017	September 20, 2017	Left reportedly after White House Chief of Staff John F. Kelly told him he needed permission to speak to the president and to provide written reports of those conversations.
White House Director of Political Affairs	Bill Stepien	January 21, 2017	December 7, 2018	
White House Counsel	Don McGahn	January 20, 2017	October 17, 2018	President Trump tweeted in August 2018 that McGahn would leave after the Kavanaugh confirmation vote.
White House Counsel	Emmet Flood	October 17, 2018	December 10, 2018	
White House Deputy Counsel	Makan Delrahim	January 20, 2017	September 28, 2017	Left to become United States Assistant Attorney General for the Department of Justice Antitrust Division.
White House Deputy Counsel	Gregory G. Katsas	January 22, 2017	December 8, 2017	Left to become a Judge of the United States Court of Appeals for the District of Columbia Circuit.
White House Deputy Counsel	Stefan Passantino	January 20, 2017	August 2018	
White House Deputy Counsel	Annie Donaldson	February 2017	December 2018	
White House Special Counsel	Ty Cobb	July 2017	May 2018	Cobb commented, "I believed then and now I worked for the country. I didn’t really have any difficulty with that. People's reactions were frequently hostile when they found out what I was doing. How hypocritical is it to think that the Democrats deserve the best people and Republicans don’t? I have served both. It’s the same country."
White House Associate Counsel	Stacy Cline Amin	January 2017		
White House Associate Counsel	Rene Augustine	January 2017	January 2018	
White House Associate Counsel	John Bash	January 2017	December 2017	Left to become United States Attorney for the Western District of Texas.
White House Associate Counsel	James Burnham	January 2017	October 2017	Resigned to become a United States Assistant Attorney General.
White House Associate Counsel	Michael Ellis	February 6, 2017	March 2, 2020	Ellis reportedly revealed classified intelligence reports to Devin Nunes, for whom he formerly worked. He was involved in the Trump–Ukraine scandal and refused to testify in the House Intelligence Committee's impeachment investigation. Became senior director for intelligence on the National Security Council.
White House Associate Counsel	Chris Grieco	January 2017	August 2018	
White House Associate Counsel	Brian Rabbitt	January 2017	November 2017	
White House Associate Counsel	Jim Schultz	January 20, 2017	November 24, 2017	
White House Associate Counsel	Steven Menashi	September 2018	November 14, 2019	Left to become a Judge of the United States Court of Appeals for the Second Circuit.
White House Deputy Associate Counsel	Stuart McCommas	January 2017	April 2018	
Personal attorney for President Trump	John M. Dowd	June 2017	March 22, 2018	Dowd cited Trump's repeatedly ignoring advice, clashing over legal strategy, and the recent hire of attorney Joseph diGenova to the legal team as justification for his resignation, while Trump cited his lack of confidence in Dowd to handle the investigation.
Legal Advisor to the President	Marc Kasowitz	May 24, 2017	July 20, 2017	
White House speechwriter	David Sorensen	January 20, 2017	February 9, 2018	Resigned after his ex-wife Jessica Corbett detailed allegations of physical and emotional abuse during their two-and-a-half year marriage. Sorensen denied the allegations, alleged that she had been abusive towards him and submitted his resignation.
White House speechwriter and Policy Aide to the President	Darren Beattie		August 19, 2018	
Personal Aide to the President	John McEntee	January 20, 2017	March 13, 2018	
Personal Aide to the President	Jordan Karem	March 13, 2018	January 2019	
Director of Oval Office Operations	Jordan Karem	June 6, 2018	January 2019	
Physician to the President	Ronny Jackson	July 25, 2013	March 28, 2018	
Chairman of the Strategic and Policy Forum	Stephen A. Schwarzman	January 22, 2017	August 16, 2017	
Chair of the Opioid and Drug Abuse Commission	Chris Christie	March 29, 2017	November 1, 2017	
Member of the Opioid and Drug Abuse Commission	Charlie Baker			
Member of the Opioid and Drug Abuse Commission	Roy Cooper			
Member of the Opioid and Drug Abuse Commission	Patrick J. Kennedy			
Member of the Opioid and Drug Abuse Commission	Bertha Madras			
Member of the Opioid and Drug Abuse Commission	Pam Bondi			
Vice Chair of the Presidential Advisory Commission on Election Integrity	Kris Kobach	May 11, 2017	January 3, 2018	
Co-chair of the Council of Governors	Mary Fallin	May 2017	January 14, 2019	
Co-chair of the Council of Governors	Dannel Malloy	Reappointment (Tenure began February 4, 2010)	January 9, 2019	
Member of the Council of Governors	Terry Branstad	March 9, 2011	May 24, 2017	
Member of the Council of Governors	Matt Mead	March 9, 2011	May 1, 2017	
Member of the Council of Governors	Brian Sandoval	February 21, 2013	May 1, 2017	
Member of the Council of Governors	Terry McAuliffe	February 24, 2015	May 1, 2017	
Member of the Council of Governors	Rick Snyder	February 24, 2015	May 1, 2017	
Member of the Council of Governors	Eric Greitens	May 2017	June 1, 2018	
Member of the Council of Governors	Bill Haslam	Reappointment (Tenure began in 2014)	January 19, 2019	
Member of the Council of Governors	Mark Dayton	Reappointment (Tenure began February 24, 2015)	January 7, 2019	
Member of the Council of Governors	Rick Scott	May 1, 2017	January 7, 2019	
Member of the Council of Governors	Bill Walker	May 1, 2017	December 3, 2018	
Member of the Council of Governors	Charlie Baker	Reappointment (Tenure began in 2016)	February 22, 2019	
Member of the Council of Governors	John Bel Edwards	Reappointment (Tenure began in 2016)	February 22, 2019	
Deputy Director for Management of the Office of Management and Budget	Margaret Weichert	February 28, 2018	March 2020	Became a managing director at Accenture.
Administrator of the Office of Information and Regulatory Affairs	Neomi Rao	July 18, 2017	March 18, 2019	Left to become a Judge of the United States Court of Appeals for the District of Columbia Circuit.
United States Chief Information Officer	Suzette Kent	January 29, 2018	July 2020	
Director of the Office of National Drug Control Policy	Kemp Chester	January 20, 2017	March 27, 2017	
Director of the Office of National Drug Control Policy	Richard J. Baum	March 28, 2017	February 9, 2018	
Deputy Chief of Staff for the Office of National Drug Control Policy and White House Liaison	Taylor Weyeneth	January 23, 2017	January 24, 2018	Formerly White House Liaison at the Office of National Drug Control Policy as a political appointee and Deputy White House Liaison/Special Assistant at the Department of Treasury, Weyeneth was the Deputy Chief of Staff until resigning on January 24, 2018. Hired by HUD in March 2018 on opioid policy, he said in January he was "unfairly criticized".
Trade Representative	Maria Pagan	January 20, 2017	March 2, 2017	
Trade Representative	Stephen Vaughn	March 2, 2017	May 15, 2017	
Senior Advisor to the President (Economic Affairs)	Kevin Hassett	April 15, 2020	July 2020	
Chairman of the Council of Economic Advisers	Kevin Hassett	September 13, 2017	June 28, 2019	
Chairman of the Council of Economic Advisers	Tomas J. Philipson	June 28, 2019	June 24, 2020	
Chairman of the Council of Economic Advisers	Tyler Goodspeed	June 23, 2020	January 6, 2021	Resigned following the 2021 attack on the U.S. Capitol.
Special Representative for International Negotiations	Jason Greenblatt	January 20, 2017	October 31, 2019	Greenblatt left before the release of the peace plan that he worked on for over two years.
Special Chairman of Federal Salary Council	Ron Sanders	December 2017	October 26, 2020	Resigned in protest to a recent Executive Order stripping federal protections from key federal workers.
White House Social Secretary	Rickie Niceta	February 8, 2017	January 6, 2021	Resigned following the 2021 attack on the U.S. Capitol.

== See also ==
- Republican National Committee chairmanship election, 2017 for the national leadership of Trump's political party
- Donald Trump Supreme Court candidates for the judicial nominees to fill the vacancies formerly held by Antonin Scalia and Anthony Kennedy
- Cabinet of Donald Trump, for the vetting process undergone by top-level roles including advice and consent by the Senate
- Sr. Advisor to the President, the role formerly held by Karl Rove under George W. Bush, then by Valerie Jarrett/David Axelrod/etc under Barack Obama
- List of executive branch 'czars' e.g. Special Advisor to the President
- List of economic advisors to Donald Trump, concentrating on the informal advisors that are not officially part of the Trump administration
- List of federal judges appointed by Donald Trump
- List of short-tenure Donald Trump political appointments
- Executive Office appointments of the second Trump administration
