= Opioid and Drug Abuse Commission =

2017 US federal advisory commission

Agency overview
- Formed: March 29, 2017; 9 years ago
- Dissolved: December 2017
- Jurisdiction: U.S. Government
- Agency executive: Chris Christie, Chair
- Parent agency: Office of National Drug Control Policy
- Key document: Presidential Executive Order Establishing the President’s Commission on Combating Drug Addiction and the Opioid Crisis
- Website: Executive Order 13784 (Archived)

Fentanyl. 2 mg (white powder to the right) is a lethal dose in most people. US penny is 19 mm (0.75 in) wide.

The Opioid and Drug Abuse Commission was a commission that advised the Trump administration on combating the ongoing opioid epidemic claiming more than 30,000 American fatalities annually in the United States. The commission was chaired by New Jersey Governor Chris Christie. The commission disbanded in December 2017.

== Commission members ==
- Chris Christie, Governor of New Jersey, Chairman
- Charlie Baker, Governor of Massachusetts
- Roy Cooper, Governor of North Carolina
- Patrick J. Kennedy, former U.S. Representative from Rhode Island
- Bertha Madras, former deputy director of the Office of National Drug Control Policy
- Pam Bondi, Attorney General of Florida

== Mission ==
According to a draft of its executive order of creation, the panel was charged with responsibilities to:

- Identify federal funding which could be directed toward medical treatments and aftercare.
- Identify areas in the U.S. with substandard opioid treatment options.
- Identify possible ways to combat the crisis through changes to prescription-writing standards.
- Identify possible ways to provide better addiction treatment options to released convicts.
- Receive support from the Office of National Drug Control Policy, the director of the latter's representing the U.S. president in interactions with the panel.

The commission's interim recommendations were slated to be due within 90 days of its inauguration and a final report, in October 2017. The final report is: The President's Commission on Combatting Drug Addiction and the Opiod Crisis - final report

== See also ==
- List of executive actions by Donald Trump
