= I'll Take Your Questions Now =

2021 nonfiction book by Stephanie Grisham

I'll Take Your Questions Now: What I Saw at the Trump White House
- First edition cover
- Author: Stephanie Grisham
- Audio read by: Stephanie Grisham
- Language: English
- Subject: first Trump Administration
- Publisher: HarperCollins
- Publication date: October 5, 2021
- Publication place: United States
- Media type: Print (hardcover), e-book, audio
- Pages: 352
- ISBN: 9780063142930 (first edition hardcover)

I'll Take Your Questions Now: What I Saw at the Trump White House is a nonfiction tell-all book written by former White House Press Secretary for the first Trump Administration, Stephanie Grisham. It was published in October 2021 by HarperCollins.

== Background ==
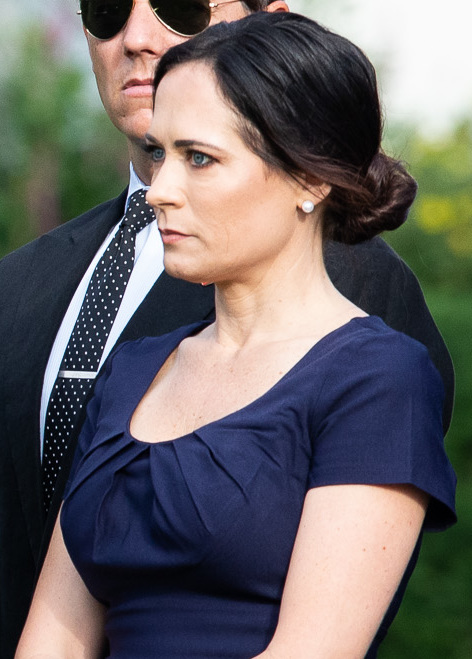
Grisham in September 2019

Stephanie Grisham served as the 32nd White House press secretary and as White House communications director from July 2019 to April 2020. She served as Chief of Staff and Press Secretary for the first lady of the United States, Melania Trump from 2020 to 2021, and previously as her Press Secretary from 2017 to 2019. She is now estranged from the Trumps. She was a press aide to Donald Trump's 2016 presidential campaign, and then a member of the presidential transition team. As Press Secretary, she was the first White House press secretary in American history to hold no press conferences, instead opting for interviews on conservative news outlets. Grisham assumed the role of chief of staff to the first lady on April 7, 2020. She resigned on January 6, 2021, following the 2021 storming of the United States Capitol. In September 2021, she announced the publication of her book.

== Responses ==
HarperCollins calls the book "The most frank and intimate portrait of the Trump White House yet." Grisham said, "[t]his is not, by the way, a book where you need to like me."

Trump himself said, "Stephanie didn't have what it takes and that was obvious from the beginning." He also said "[s]he had big problems and we felt that she should work out those problems for herself."
