= Lindsay Walters Clifton =

American government official

White House Deputy Press Secretary
- In office January 22, 2017 – April 13, 2019 Serving with Hogan Gidley
- President: Donald Trump
- Leader: Sarah Sanders
- Succeeded by: Judd Deere

Personal details
- Party: Republican
- Education: Drexel University (BS)
Association football career
- Position: Goalkeeper
Youth career
- 2003–2007: Archmere Academy Auks
College career
Years	Team	Apps	(Gls)
2007–2012	Drexel Dragons	0	(0)

Lindsay Walters Clifton is an American spokesperson and former White House Special Assistant to the President and Deputy Press Secretary.

== Education ==
Clifton attended Archmere Academy and graduated from Drexel University, where she received a Bachelor of Science in marketing, advertising, and public relations from the Bennett S. LeBow College of Business in 2012. While at Drexel, she played on the women's soccer team.

== Career ==
In 2012, Clifton worked for Mitt Romney's presidential campaign. She left the private sector, where she had worked for the strategic firm The Glover Park Group., to come to Illinois to work in Illinois Republican Bruce Rauner's gubernatorial campaign. Rauner defeated incumbent Democratic governor Pat Quinn in 2014. Clifton went on to serve in Rauner's administration as Deputy Press Secretary.

Clifton served as the National Spokeswoman at the Republican National Committee. During her tenure at the RNC, she frequently appeared on television, and managed the press engagements for the chairman.

Beginning in January 2017, Clifton worked in the first Trump Administration as Special Assistant and White House Deputy Press Secretary. where she had a focus on the national economic portfolio. She also traveled extensively on behalf of the White House, managing press corps logistics and briefing reporters aboard Air Force One.

Clifton joined Edelman in April 2019. She currently serves as a senior advisor.
