= Joanna Rosholm =

American government official

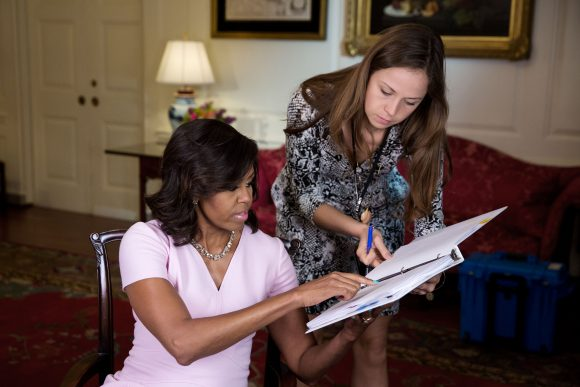

Press Secretary for the First Lady
- In office January 6, 2014 – January 20, 2017
- President: Barack Obama
- Leader: Michelle Obama
- Preceded by: Hannah August
- Succeeded by: Stephanie Grisham

Personal details
- Born: Tustin, California, U.S.
- Party: Democratic
- Education: Chapman University (BA); Georgetown University (MA)

Joanna Rosholm is the former press secretary and deputy communications director for First Lady of the United States Michelle Obama.

== Early life and education ==
The day after Rosholm was born, her mother died of Ehlers–Danlos syndromes. She grew up in Tustin, California, and attended high school at Foothill High School. After high school, she earned her Bachelor of Arts in communications from Chapman University and a Master of Arts in communications from Georgetown University.

== Career ==
After graduating from Georgetown, Rosholm joined the Democratic National Committee as assistant press secretary. In 2010, she became a regional communications director at the White House.

In January 2014, she replaced Hannah August as press secretary to First Lady Michelle Obama, serving until the end of the Obama administration. She was succeeded by Stephanie Grisham.
