= Judd Deere =

American political advisor (born 1987)

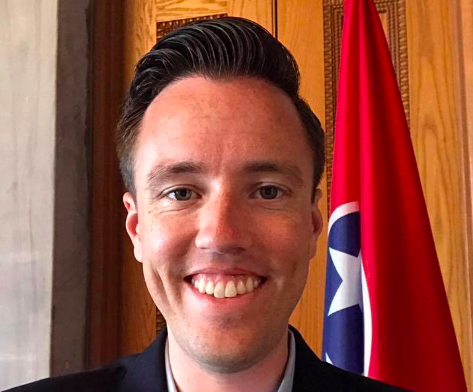

White House Deputy Press Secretary
- In office January 31, 2019 – January 20, 2021 Serving with Hogan Gidley, Sarah Matthews
- President: Donald Trump
- Preceded by: Lindsay Walters; Hogan Gidley
- Succeeded by: TJ Ducklo; Sabrina Singh

Personal details
- Born: Judson Deere; November 28, 1987 (age 38) Benton, Arkansas, U.S.
- Party: Republican
- Education: Lyon College (BA)

Judson Porter Deere (born November 28, 1987) is an American political advisor who served as deputy assistant to the president and White House deputy press secretary in the administration of Donald Trump.

== Early life and education ==
Deere was born in Benton, Arkansas, and graduated from Lyon College in 2010 with a Bachelor of Arts degree in political science and history. Deere was previously married to Meagan Bullock. They graduated from Lyon College.

== Career ==
Deere began his career as a field director for the Republican Party of Arkansas during the 2010 election. He then became an aide to U.S. Senator John Boozman, as Correspondence and Systems Director. In June 2012, he was hired as Director of New Media for U.S. Senator Mike Crapo and was based in his Washington, D.C. office.

In 2014, Deere worked for Tim Griffin's campaign for Lieutenant Governor of Arkansas. In December 2014, he became the communications director for Arkansas Attorney General Leslie Rutledge, leaving in November 2017.

Deere left Arkansas in November 2017 to work in Washington, D.C. in the Donald Trump administration, as director of state and local communications in the White House. In September 2018, he was promoted to Special Assistant to the President and Director of Media Affairs. In January 2019, he was appointed Special Assistant to the President and Deputy Press Secretary.

On August 27, 2020, Deere, while acting as a spokesman for the Trump Administration White House sent a threat letter to The Washington Post newspaper demanding that they cease reporting on the business dealings of the Trump Organization, a private company. Deere also advised that the White House had assembled a "dossier" on Post reporter David Fahrenthold for criticism of the Administration. Fahrenthold has reported on Trump family's business interests for several years now, but perhaps his best-known article about the President was his 2016 scoop about Access Hollywood tapes, which showed the future President describing how he felt stardom gave him permission to assault women. Deere's threatening comments were included in a response to a request for comment on an article that shows the U.S. Secret Service has spent more than $900,000 at Trump properties during Trump's presidency.

== Personal life ==
Deere, who is openly gay, has defended Donald Trump and Mike Pence amid criticisms that the Trump Administration was anti-LGBTQ.
