= Hannah August =

American press secretary

Press Secretary for the First Lady
- In office May 25, 2011 – January 6, 2014
- President: Barack Obama
- Leader: Michelle Obama
- Preceded by: Katie McCormick-Lelyveld
- Succeeded by: Joanna Rosholm

Personal details
- Born: Livingston, New Jersey, U.S.
- Party: Democratic
- Education: University of Pennsylvania (BA)

Hannah August is the former Press Secretary for the First Lady of the United States, Michelle Obama. Prior to that, she was previously a White House regional communications director and a spokeswoman at United States Department of Justice.

== Early life and education ==
Hannah August is the daughter of Charles "Buddy" August, a former council member of Livingston, New Jersey. She graduated from Livingston High School in 2001. She graduated from University of Pennsylvania in 2005 with bachelor's degree in International Relations.

== Career experience ==
After graduation, August worked as the Press Assistant for Senator Bob Menendez. She served as Deputy Communications Director for the Democratic Senatorial Campaign Committee in June 2007 after Deirdre Murphy left the post. August joined the Department of Justice as a spokeswoman in which she handled the press communications in high-profile cases such as BP oil spill and the department's lawsuit against the state of Arizona related to immigration law.

August joined the White House in 2010 as Regional Communications Director. She served as Press Secretary to the First Lady from May 25, 2011 through January 6, 2014.
