= Liz Sara =

American businessperson

Elizabeth Sara is an American businessperson, recently completing nearly 3 years as President of the SCORE Foundation, supporting small businesses and entrepreneurs across the country. She previously served as Chairperson of the National Women's Business Council since July 2018. She was nominated for the position by President Donald Trump.

== Career ==
Sara earned a bachelor's degree from the State University of New York and a master's degree from the University of Maryland.

Sara has been an executive in a variety of companies, including SpaceWorks Enterprises, LexisNexis, United Press International, Thomson Financial, and Best Marketing, LLC. As the founder and CEO of the successful Best Marketing firm, she advised more than 90 startups and growth stage companies increase their revenue and market adoption of their products and services. She has been an adjunct professor at the Smith School of Business and was the board chair of the Dingman Center of Entrepreneurship.

Sara formerly resided in Washington, D.C. and currently lives in Boca Raton, Florida.
