= Stephanie Grisham =

American former government official (born 1976)

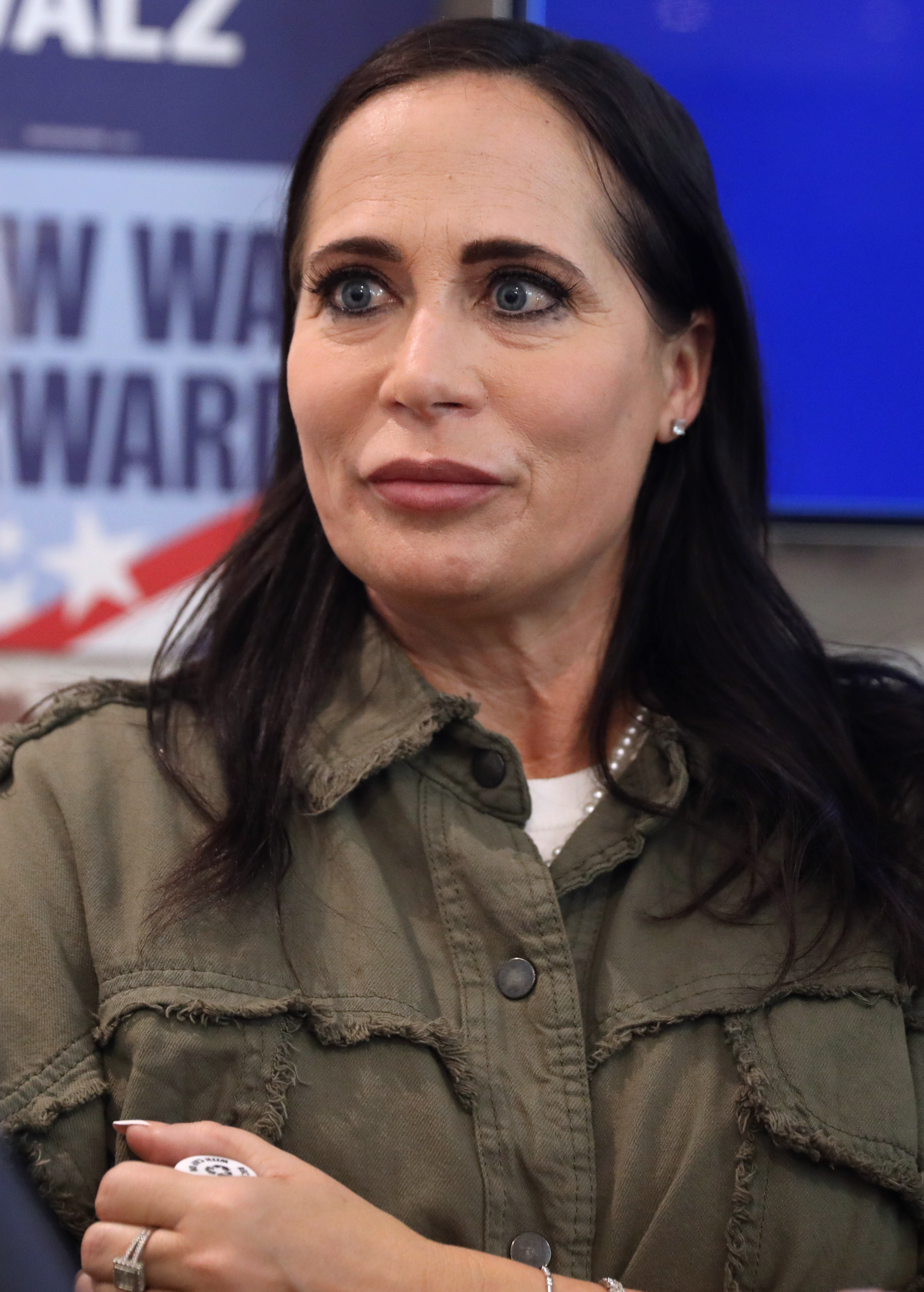
- Grisham in 2024

Chief of Staff to the First Lady of the United States
- In office April 7, 2020 – January 6, 2021
- President: Donald Trump
- First Lady: Melania Trump
- Preceded by: Lindsay Reynolds
- Succeeded by: Julissa Reynoso Pantaleón

Press Secretary for the First Lady
- In office April 7, 2020 – January 6, 2021
- President: Donald Trump
- First Lady: Melania Trump
- Preceded by: Herself (2019)
- Succeeded by: Michael LaRosa
- In office March 27, 2017 – July 1, 2019
- President: Donald Trump
- First Lady: Melania Trump
- Preceded by: Joanna Rosholm
- Succeeded by: Herself (2020)

32nd White House Press Secretary
- In office July 1, 2019 – April 7, 2020
- President: Donald Trump
- Deputy: Hogan Gidley
- Preceded by: Sarah Huckabee Sanders
- Succeeded by: Kayleigh McEnany

White House Communications Director
- In office July 1, 2019 – April 7, 2020
- President: Donald Trump
- Preceded by: Bill Shine
- Succeeded by: Kate Bedingfield

Personal details
- Born: Stephanie Ann Sommerville; July 23, 1976 (age 50) Colorado, U.S.
- Party: Democratic (from 2021); Republican (until 2021)
- Spouse(s): Dan Marries (m. 1997; div. 2004) Todd Grisham (m. 2004; div. 2006)
- Children: 2
- Education: Colorado Mesa University (attended)

Stephanie Ann Grisham (née Sommerville; born July 23, 1976) is an American former White House official who was the 32nd White House press secretary and served as White House communications director from July 2019 to April 2020. She was chief of staff for the first lady of the United States, Melania Trump, from 2020 to 2021, after previously serving as her press secretary from 2017 to 2019.

Grisham was a press aide to Donald Trump's 2016 presidential campaign, and then a member of the presidential transition team. She was Trump's third White House press secretary, succeeding Sarah Huckabee Sanders, and was the first White House press secretary to hold no press conferences, instead opting for interviews on conservative news outlets. Grisham assumed the role of chief of staff to the first lady on April 7, 2020.

Grisham resigned on January 6, 2021, in the hours immediately after the 2021 storming of the United States Capitol. She has since become a critic of Trump. In September 2021, she announced the publication of her book about her time working in the Trump administration, I'll Take Your Questions Now.

== Early life ==
Stephanie Ann Sommerville was born in Colorado to Robert Leo Sommerville and Elizabeth Ann Calkins. Her parents divorced, and her mother remarried, first to Dave Allen, with whom she had another daughter, and then to Roger Schroder. Grisham came from a farming family. She moved with her mother to East Wenatchee, Washington, where she graduated from Eastmont High School in 1994. Her mother has since moved to Nebraska, where she is known as Ann Schroder.

According to the Arizona secretary of state's office, Grisham began voting in Arizona as a registered Democrat in 1997. She became a Republican after 2007.

== Career ==
Grisham was the spokeswoman for AAA Arizona in 2007, but was fired within a year after being accused of falsifying expense reports. Grisham was fired from a subsequent job at ad agency Mindspace over plagiarism charges, copying AAA material verbatim into her client's web page.

From 2008 to 2010, Grisham worked as a spokeswoman for the Arizona Charter Schools Association. There she met Tom Horne, Arizona's superintendent of public schools. From about 2011 to 2014, Grisham was spokeswoman for Tom Horne after he was elected Arizona attorney general. She witnessed the 2014 execution of Joseph Wood and claimed that the two-hour ordeal had been "quite peaceful," contrary to several reports that Wood had "gasped and snorted" throughout his execution.

After Republican Mark Brnovich defeated Horne in the 2014 GOP primary, Grisham worked as a spokesperson for the Arizona House of Representatives Republican caucus. She revoked the Arizona Capitol Times's press credentials hours after their reporting that the House speaker, David Gowan, had traveled at state taxpayers' expense during his campaign for Congress. She then required all reporters to undergo a criminal background check in order to obtain press credentials, with either serious criminal offenses or misdemeanor trespass being grounds for refusal. The latter provision seemed notable, as the reporter for the Capitol Times was the only reporter with misdemeanor trespass in his background. Reporters refused to comply, and Gowan rescinded the order.

In 2012, Grisham also worked for Mitt Romney's 2012 presidential campaign. In September 2015, Grisham worked as a press coordinator for Pope Francis's visit to Philadelphia as an independent contractor.

=== Trump campaign and transition ===
Circa August 2015, Grisham started working as a press aide to Donald Trump's 2016 presidential campaign. She helped arrange his campaign stops in Phoenix and around the state and region throughout the primary, a role that quickly expanded to include his rallies around the U.S. Grisham was on state payroll until May 2016, when she took an unpaid leave from the Arizona House of Representatives to work on Trump's campaign.

After his victory, Grisham was named a special adviser for operations and won a place on Trump's transition team. Arizona House speaker David Gowan paid her $19,000 in state salary over an 8-week period while she was serving as a member of the Trump transition team.

=== Trump administration ===
After Trump's January 2017 inauguration, Grisham was named deputy press secretary for Sean Spicer in the West Wing of the White House.

In March 2017, Melania Trump moved her over to the East Wing. A former White House colleague said that the president regretted losing Grisham to the first lady's office because of Grisham's loyalty and skill at handling the press while acting as his traveling press secretary. During that time, she built relationships with many reporters at events. Despite losing Grisham as part of his own staff, President Trump said he was satisfied that the first lady would "be in good hands". Grisham was described by several sources who had worked with her previously as being "highly competent" and "self-aware"; some suggested that she enjoyed "trolling the press".

The United States Office of Special Counsel stated that Grisham violated the Hatch Act of 1939 following a complaint by Senator Tom Carper. Grisham was accused of using her official Twitter account on July 11, 2018, to tweet out Trump's campaign slogan. Violation of the act is not a crime, but a workplace guideline, and the agency responded by sending Grisham a warning letter.

In July 2019, Grisham replaced Sarah Sanders as White House press secretary and White House communications director. Grisham's appointment was announced by Melania Trump via Twitter on June 25, 2019. The June 28, 2019 Annual Report to Congress on White House Office Personnel listed Grisham as "Assistant to the President and Deputy Chief of Staff for Communications for the First Lady", with an annual salary of $183,000.

On September 5, 2019, the Washington Examiner published an opinion piece written by Grisham and her deputy Hogan Gidley entitled, "The Washington Post's lost summer". The authors asserted the Post had not reported on several Trump accomplishments that the paper actually did report. In one instance, the piece linked to a Post story entitled "Trump becomes first sitting president to set foot into North Korea" as the authors asserted the paper had not reported the event.

On September 23, 2019, when asked by the hosts of Fox & Friends if the White House planned to resume its daily press briefing, Grisham said "not right now... I mean, ultimately, if the president decides that it's something we should do, we can do that, but right now he's doing just fine. And to be honest, the briefings have become a lot of theater. And I think that a lot of reporters were doing it to get famous. I mean, yeah, they're writing books now. I mean, they're all getting famous off of this presidency. And so, I think it's great what we're doing now."

On October 24, 2019, while again appearing on Fox & Friends, Grisham defended Trump's description of "Never Trump Republicans" as "human scum". When asked if Trump should apologize, Grisham said "No, no, he shouldn't. The people who are against him and who have been against him and working against his [agenda] since the day they took office are just that. It is horrible that people are working against a president who is delivering results for this country and has been since day one. And, the fact that people continue to try to negate anything he's been trying to do and take away from the good work he's doing on behalf of the American people, they deserve strong language like that."

On October 26, 2019, in response to criticism of President Trump by his former chief of staff John F. Kelly Grisham stated, "I worked with John Kelly, and he was totally unequipped to handle the genius of our President."

On November 13, 2019, during the testimony of William B. Taylor Jr., Grisham commented that the impeachment inquiry against Donald Trump was a "sham hearing" that is "not only boring, it is a colossal waste of taxpayer time & money."

That same month, Grisham claimed that Obama administration officials had left "you will fail" notes for the incoming Trump administration officials. Numerous Obama administration officials rejected the claim. Grisham ultimately retracted her assertion.

In December 2019, Grisham defended President Trump's implication that former congressman John Dingell was in hell. She described Trump as a "counter-puncher" who was "under attack".

On April 7, 2020, it was announced that Grisham left her role as White House Press Secretary and returned to the East Wing to be Melania Trump's chief of staff, effective that same day.

On the evening of January 6, 2021, Grisham resigned from her position as Melania Trump's chief of staff following the 2021 storming of the United States Capitol.

She would later reveal during her testimony to the January 6th Committee, that she resigned because of the conduct of Trump and his advisers. This included a text message exchange she related having with Melania Trump, who offered a curt response when Grisham asked her if she wanted to address the public in order to call for an end to the violence. According to Grisham, she asked Melania, "Do you want to tweet that peaceful protests are the right of every American, but there is no place for lawlessness & violence?" Melania responded with a single word: "No." In a December 2022 CNN interview Grisham told host Sara Sidner that Melania had come to believe her husband's lie that the election had been stolen.

==== Briefing controversy ====
Grisham continued a period where there were no formal press briefings for more than a year, and there were none during her entire tenure as press secretary. However, she appeared on Fox News, Fox Business Network, One America News Network, and the Sinclair Broadcast Group on many occasions during the same period.

Anderson Cooper 360° devoted two prime-time segments in one week to question whether taxpayers should pay her $183,000 salary, and to accuse her of hypocrisy. "Miss Grisham has gone from 'we are human beings' to 'they are human scum.' ... It's actually really kind of sad". Her "unintentionally ironic and deeply hypocritical" social media statements and infrequent televised interviews "appear meant to defend the president but actually point out the president's own failings". Margaret Sullivan wrote in The Washington Post that Grisham "may hold the title but she's not doing the job".

Authors Don Winslow and Stephen King pledged to donate $100,000 each to charity if Grisham held a one-hour briefing answering questions from the White House press corps. Thirteen former White House and military press secretaries from three administrations before Trump published a letter calling for press briefings to return. However, the press briefings never restarted during her tenure. In 2024, Grisham stated that she did not hold press briefings "because, unlike my boss, I never wanted to stand at that podium and lie".

=== Post-Trump administration ===
After leaving the White House, Grisham became a critic of Trump. On January 5, 2022, Grisham testified to the January 6 Committee. She had testified to them once before, but that testimony was briefer. According to the Guardian, she told the committee that Trump held secret meetings in the White House residence in the weeks before the Capitol attack and that the Secret Service had received a presidential document reflecting Trump's intentions to march to the Capitol on January 6. She testified again on May 18, 2022.

On August 20, 2024, Grisham spoke at the 2024 Democratic National Convention, saying that Trump mocked his supporters in private, calling them "basement dwellers", and that he had "no morals and no fidelity to the truth". Grisham also repeated what she had told the January 6 Committee, about Melania Trump's attitude regarding the violence of the Capitol riot, relating to the audience, "On January 6, I asked Melania if we can at least tweet that 'While peaceful protest is the right of every American, there's no place for lawlessness or violence.'" The text shown of this proposed message was shown on the screens behind her, Melania's one-word response, "No."

== Personal life ==
As Stephanie Ann Sommerville, she married Danny Don Marries in Nevada on April 7, 1997. They met at Mesa State College in Grand Junction, Colorado. Her husband joined KOLD-TV as a news anchor in Tucson, Arizona, on the day after their son's first birthday. They divorced in 2004.

Later in 2004, she married Todd Grisham, then a KOLD sportscaster. They divorced in 2006.

On December 25, 2007, Grisham had a second son, Jake.

In 2019–2020, Grisham dated then-Trump White House aide Max Miller. Politico reported that the relationship ended in 2020 after an argument in which Miller allegedly pushed Grisham up against a wall and slapped her in the face after she accused him of infidelity. Miller has denied the report. Miller filed a defamation lawsuit against Grisham for the accusations. Grisham moved to dismiss the lawsuit but Judge Emily Hagan rejected Grisham's motion. Miller voluntarily dismissed the case with prejudice in August 2023.

=== Incidents of driving while intoxicated ===
On January 9, 2013, Grisham was pulled over for speeding in Gilbert, Arizona. The officer observed Grisham's signs of intoxication, and she failed a field sobriety test. Grisham denied consuming any alcohol, but said she had taken a Xanax 90 minutes earlier and a Zoloft the prior night. A blood test revealed Grisham's blood alcohol content to be .105 percent, which is above the .08 legal limit in Arizona. She also was found to be driving on a suspended license since August 2012 for failure to answer a traffic citation. In August 2014, Grisham accepted a plea bargain agreement that reduced the charge to misdemeanor reckless driving, plus two years of probation. She returned to court twice for failure to pay the $779 in fines and failure to complete a Mothers Against Drunk Driving program.

Shortly after midnight, December 5, 2015, Grisham was arrested again in Phoenix, Arizona, for driving without her headlights on and suspicion of driving under the influence, violating her probation. Grisham failed to appear at her court hearing on January 19, 2016, whereupon the judge issued a warrant for her arrest. Afterwards, Grisham pleaded guilty. In July 2016, she was ordered into a treatment program and to pay nearly $1,600 in court costs and fines.

== See also ==
- List of former Trump administration officials who endorsed Kamala Harris
- List of Republicans who oppose the Donald Trump 2024 presidential campaign
- Timeline of the Donald Trump presidency

Political offices
Preceded by Bill Shine	White House Director of Communications; 2019–2020	Succeeded by Dan Scavino as White House Deputy Chief of Staff for Communications
Preceded by Sarah Sanders	White House Press Secretary; 2019–2020	Succeeded by Kayleigh McEnany
Preceded by Lindsay Reynolds	Chief of Staff to the First Lady; 2020–2021	Succeeded by Julissa Reynoso Pantaleón
