= Zachary Fuentes =

American political advisor and businessman

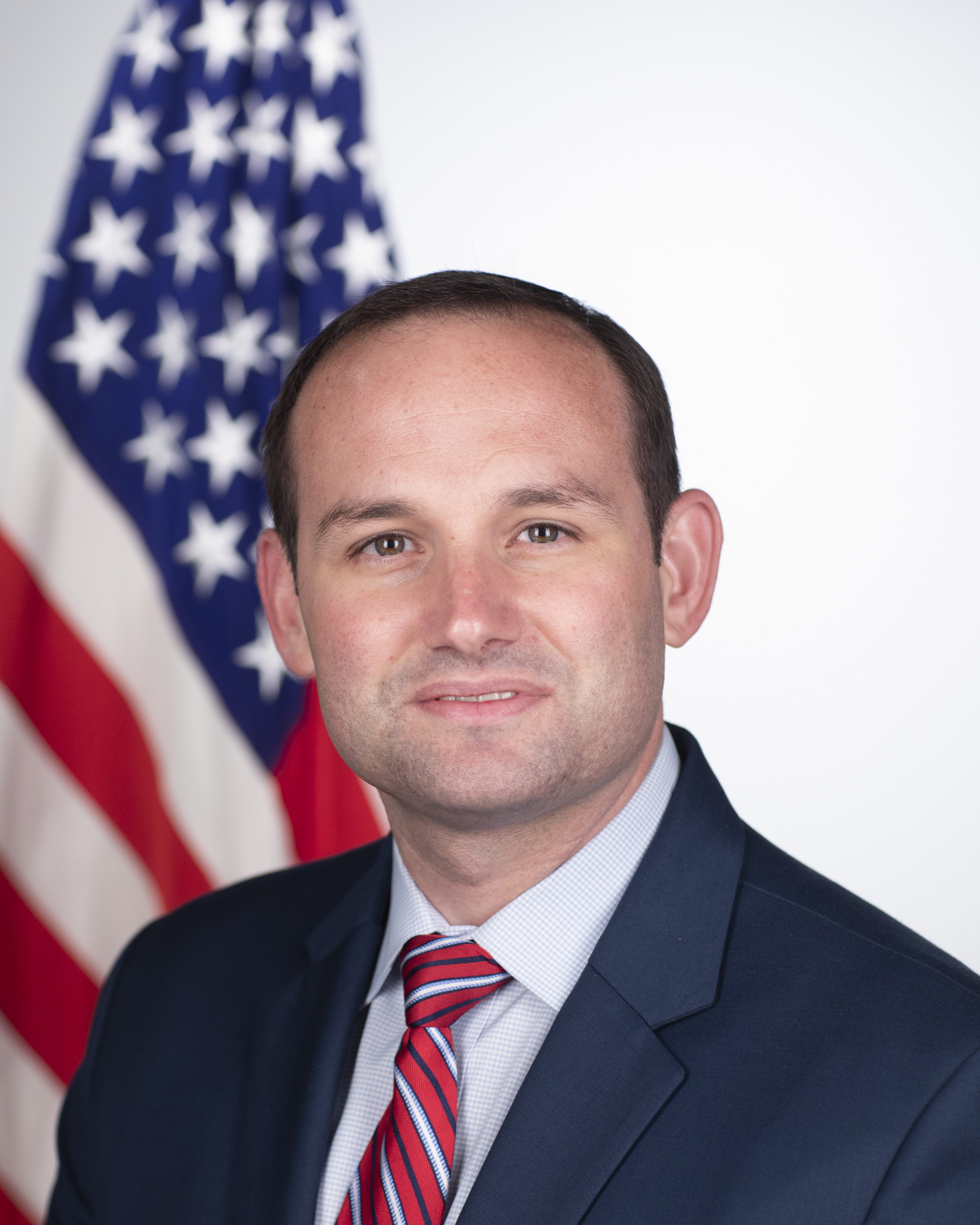
- Official portrait, 2018

White House Principal Deputy Chief of Staff
- In office June 6, 2018 – January 2, 2019
- President: Donald Trump
- Preceded by: James W. Carroll
- Succeeded by: Emma Doyle

Personal details
- Born: 1981 or 1982 (age 43–44)
- Party: Republican
- Education: United States Coast Guard Academy (BS)

Military service
- Allegiance: United States
- Branch/service: United States Coast Guard

Zachary D. Fuentes is an American political advisor and businessman who served as Assistant to the President and Deputy Chief of Staff in the first Trump Administration. He formerly served as a senior advisor and assistant to John F. Kelly, while he served as White House Chief of Staff and Secretary of Homeland Security. He left the Trump administration in January 2019.

== Education ==
A member of the United States Coast Guard, Fuentes earned a Bachelor of Science degree from the United States Coast Guard Academy.

== Career ==
In November 2018, Fuentes was blamed for the decision that Trump would not be able to fly or drive in a motorcade to the Aisne-Marne American Cemetery and Memorial as part of the First World War centenary.

The New York Times reported on December 20, 2018, that Fuentes, an officer on active duty with the United States Coast Guard, had discussed inserting a provision into a House bill that would have allowed him to take advantage of a Coast Guard early retirement program that had previously expired. Homeland Security officials began pressing Congress to reinstate the provision in November 2018. It was abruptly withdrawn from a bill after reporters had inquired about it in December.

After Kelly's exit from the white house was announced on December 8, 2018, President Donald Trump rejected Fuentes as being named interim chief of staff. Fuentes told colleagues he was planning to "hide out" in the Eisenhower Executive Office Building for six months to accomplish the retirement program minimum career length. In the White House, Fuentes' nicknames included "Zotus", "deputy president", and "prime minister".

On January 2, 2019, Fuentes' White House title changed to Assistant to The President and Senior Adviser to the Chief of Staff, Mick Mulvaney. This was reported as a sign of Fuentes' expected departure from the White House.

During the 2020 COVID-19 pandemic, Fuentes created the company Zach Fuentes LLC and received a $3 million contract from the Indian Health Service to provide protective face masks to hospitals in the Navajo Nation, 11 days after creating the company. Over 25% of the masks were reported to be unsuitable for medical use, and another 15% were of a type that was not requested. US House of Representatives members Gerry Connolly and Ruben Gallego called for an investigation of the contract, and principal deputy inspector general Christi Grimm of the Office of Inspector General, U.S. Department of Health and Human Services said that the office would contact Connolly for more information on the matter. By July 2020, NPR reported that Congress was investigating the awarding of the contract to Fuentes's company.
