= Lindsay Reynolds =

American event planner

Chief of Staff to the First Lady of the United States
- In office February 1, 2017 – April 7, 2020
- President: Donald Trump
- First Lady: Melania Trump
- Preceded by: Tina Tchen
- Succeeded by: Stephanie Grisham

Personal details
- Born: Cincinnati, Ohio, U.S.

Lindsay Reynolds is an American event planner and government employee who served as the chief of staff of First Lady of the United States Melania Trump. She previously worked as associate director of the White House Visitors Office under President George W. Bush.

== Early life ==
Reynolds is a native of Cincinnati, Ohio.

== Career ==
Reynold worked as a third grade teacher in Cincinnati, Ohio before joining the Bush Administration in 2004 to work in the Visitors Office. After leaving the Bush Administration, Reynolds established her own event planning business. She also worked for Senator Rob Portman.

Reynolds was named as Melania Trump's chief of staff in February 2017, an unusually late hiring announcement for the key role.

During Reynolds' tenure as chief of staff to the First Lady, a staffer in the First Lady's office was reportedly fired for having an account on a gay dating app. In 2018, Reynolds reportedly argued against Melania Trump's desire to send mirrors to children she visited in Africa.

Reynolds played a role in hiring Anthony Ornato to be Deputy Chief of Staff for Operations in 2019.

On April 7, 2020, First Lady Melania Trump announced that Reynolds had resigned as Chief of Staff "to spend time with her family" and that Stephanie Grisham would immediately replace her in the role.

In 2023, Reynolds was named to the Board of Directors of the National First Ladies Library.

== Personal life ==
Reynolds is the daughter-in-law of Republican fundraiser and former ambassador Mercer Reynolds.
