= Kenneth I. Juster =

American diplomat (born 1954)

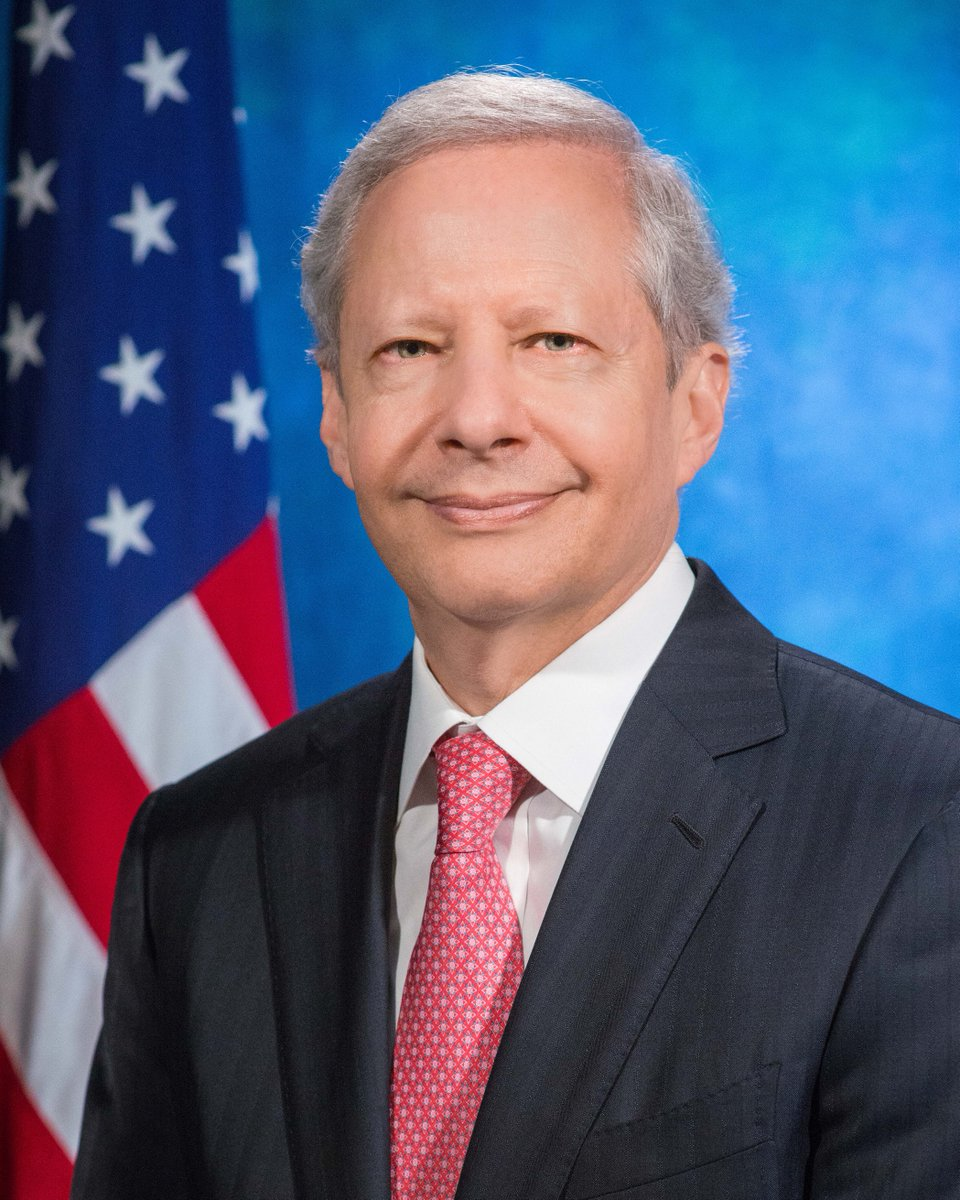

25th United States Ambassador to India
- In office November 23, 2017 – January 20, 2021
- President: Donald Trump
- Preceded by: Richard Verma
- Succeeded by: Eric Garcetti

Deputy Director of the National Economic Council
- In office January 20, 2017 – June 7, 2017
- President: Donald Trump
- Preceded by: Adewale Adeyemo
- Succeeded by: Everett Eissenstat

Under Secretary of Commerce for Industry and Security
- In office 2001–2005
- President: George W. Bush
- Preceded by: William Alan Reinsch
- Succeeded by: David McCormick

Counselor of the United States Department of State
- Acting
- In office 1992–1993
- President: George H. W. Bush
- Preceded by: Robert B. Zoellick
- Succeeded by: Tim Wirth

Personal details
- Born: November 24, 1954 (age 71) New York City, U.S.
- Relatives: Norton Juster (uncle)
- Education: Harvard University (BA, MPP, JD)

Kenneth Ian Juster (born November 24, 1954) is an American former diplomat, who served as the United States Ambassador to India from 2017 to 2021. He is currently senior counselor at the global law firm Freshfields Bruckhaus Deringer, senior adviser at the institutional investor CDPQ, strategic adviser at the software company Salesforce, and distinguished fellow at the Council on Foreign Relations.

Juster's career has spanned over 40 years in government, law, business, finance, and international affairs. In the U.S. Government, in addition to being Ambassador to India, he has served as deputy assistant to the president for international economic affairs, at both the National Security Council and the National Economic Council; Under Secretary of Commerce; counselor (acting) of the Department of State; and deputy and senior advisor to Deputy Secretary of State Lawrence S. Eagleburger. In the private sector, he has previously been a partner at the global investment firm Warburg Pincus, a senior executive at Salesforce, and a senior partner at the law firm Arnold & Porter. Juster has also served as the chairman of the advisory committee of Harvard's Weatherhead Center for International Affairs (where he is now a member of the Committee), chairman of Freedom House, and vice chairman of the Asia Foundation. He is currently on the board of directors of the American Ditchley Foundation, the board of governors of the East-West Center, and the advisory council of the Bhutan Foundation. He is also a member of the Trilateral Commission, the Council on Foreign Relations, the American Academy of Diplomacy, and the Council of American Ambassadors.

== Early life and education ==
Juster was born in New York City. His father, Howard H. Juster, was an architect. His mother, Muriel (Uchitelle) Juster, was a high school social studies teacher. He has an older brother, Andrew A. Juster, who was the CFO at the Simon Property Group His uncle, Norton Juster, was an architect and author, who wrote The Phantom Tollbooth and The Dot and the Line, among other books.

Juster grew up in Scarsdale, New York. He attended Greenacres Elementary School, where he was named a Distinguished Alumnus in 2010. While at Scarsdale Junior High School, Juster, Peter Hillman and another friend interviewed Mick Jagger and Keith Richards of the Rolling Stones in 1966 for the school newspaper. Juster graduated from Scarsdale High School in 1972, where he was the president of the Honor Society, an AFS exchange student in Thailand (1971), and a member of the varsity basketball team. Juster was named a Distinguished Alumnus of Scarsdale High School in 2007.

Juster graduated from Harvard College, Phi Beta Kappa, in 1976, with a Bachelor of Arts in Government (magna cum laude). While at Harvard, he was the research assistant to Professor Samuel P. Huntington, the general manager of Harvard Political Review, and an undergraduate associate of Harvard's Center for International Affairs (CFIA). Juster received a grant from the CFIA in 1975 to conduct research in Japan for his senior thesis, "How Process Affects Substance: Japanese Foreign Policy Making During the Oil Crisis of 1972–1973," under Professors Edwin O. Reischauer and Robert L. Paarlberg. The Japan Interpreter published an abbreviated version of the thesis, entitled “Foreign Policy-Making During the Oil Crisis,” in its Winter 1977 edition. Juster completed a four-year joint degree program in 1980 at the Harvard Law School, graduating with a Juris Doctor (cum laude), and at Harvard's Kennedy School of Government, graduating with a Master of Public Policy.

== Career ==
=== Early career ===
Juster first worked in the U.S. government in 1978 as an intern at the National Security Council under one of his mentors, Samuel P. Huntington, who was the White House Coordinator of Security Planning. In that position, Juster contributed to Presidential Review Memorandum/NSC-10 on the Comprehensive Net Assessment and Military Posture Review. Upon graduation from the Harvard Law School, Juster served as a law clerk from 1980 to 1981 to Judge James L. Oakes of the U.S. Court of Appeals for the Second Circuit.

From 1981 to 1989 and 1993 to 2001, Juster practiced law at Arnold & Porter, where he became a senior partner. His work involved international arbitration and litigation, corporate counseling, regulatory matters, and international trade and transactions. Among his noteworthy cases was his representation of the government of Panama-in-exile against the Noriega regime in 1988 and 1989.

=== George H. W. Bush administration ===
Juster served as the deputy and senior adviser to Deputy Secretary of State Lawrence S. Eagleburger from 1989 to 1992, and as the Counselor (Acting) of the United States Department of State from 1992 to 1993. He was one of the key U.S. Government officials involved in establishing and managing U.S. assistance programs to Central and Eastern Europe and the former Soviet Union, including setting up the initial Enterprise Funds for that region. On behalf of Secretary of State James A. Baker III, Juster organized the first Coordinating Conference on Assistance to the Newly Independent States (NIS) of the former Soviet Union in January 1992, shortly after the collapse of the U.S.S.R. He also led the first international delegation to meet with representatives of the NIS in Minsk, Belarus in February 1992. In addition, Juster was a member of the five-man team, led by Deputy Secretary Eagleburger, that traveled to Israel directly prior to and during the first Gulf War to negotiate with the Israelis regarding their posture during that War. Juster was also actively involved at State in policy matters relating to China, Japan, Latin America, and the Persian Gulf. Upon completion of his tenure at the State Department, Juster received the Secretary of State's Distinguished Service Award and Medal, the State Department's highest honor. He also later received the Officer's Cross of the Order of Merit from the president of the Federal Republic of Germany for his contributions to U.S.-German relations during the end of the Cold War and in its aftermath.

=== George. W. Bush administration ===
Juster served as U.S. Under Secretary of Commerce from 2001 to 2005, in charge of the Bureau of Industry and Security. In that capacity, Juster oversaw issues at the intersection of business and national security, including strategic trade controls related to the exports of sensitive U.S. goods and technologies, imports and foreign investments that affect U.S. security, enforcement of anti-boycott laws, and industry compliance with international arms control agreements.

Juster co-founded and served as the U.S. Chair of the U.S.–India High Technology Cooperation Group. He was also one of the key architects of the Next Steps in Strategic Partnership initiative between the United States and India. His work related to India played an important role in the transformation of the U.S.-India relationship and helped provide the foundation for the historic civil nuclear agreement between the two countries. Juster received the U.S.-India Business Council's Blackwill Award for his contributions to U.S.-India relations.

Juster was also responsible for negotiating and signing the End-Use Visit Understanding between the United States and China, which strengthened the security of exports of U.S. technology to China. In addition, he launched the Transshipment Country Export Control Initiative, which enhanced security through increased export controls at major transshipment hubs such as Hong Kong, Singapore, Panama, and the United Arab Emirates. He also worked extensively with Israel on the export of sensitive technologies, and with European allies and Japan in coordinating export control initiatives. Upon completion of his term at the Commerce Department, Juster received the Secretary of Commerce's William C. Redfield Award and Medal, the Commerce Department's Highest Honor.

=== Technology and finance ===
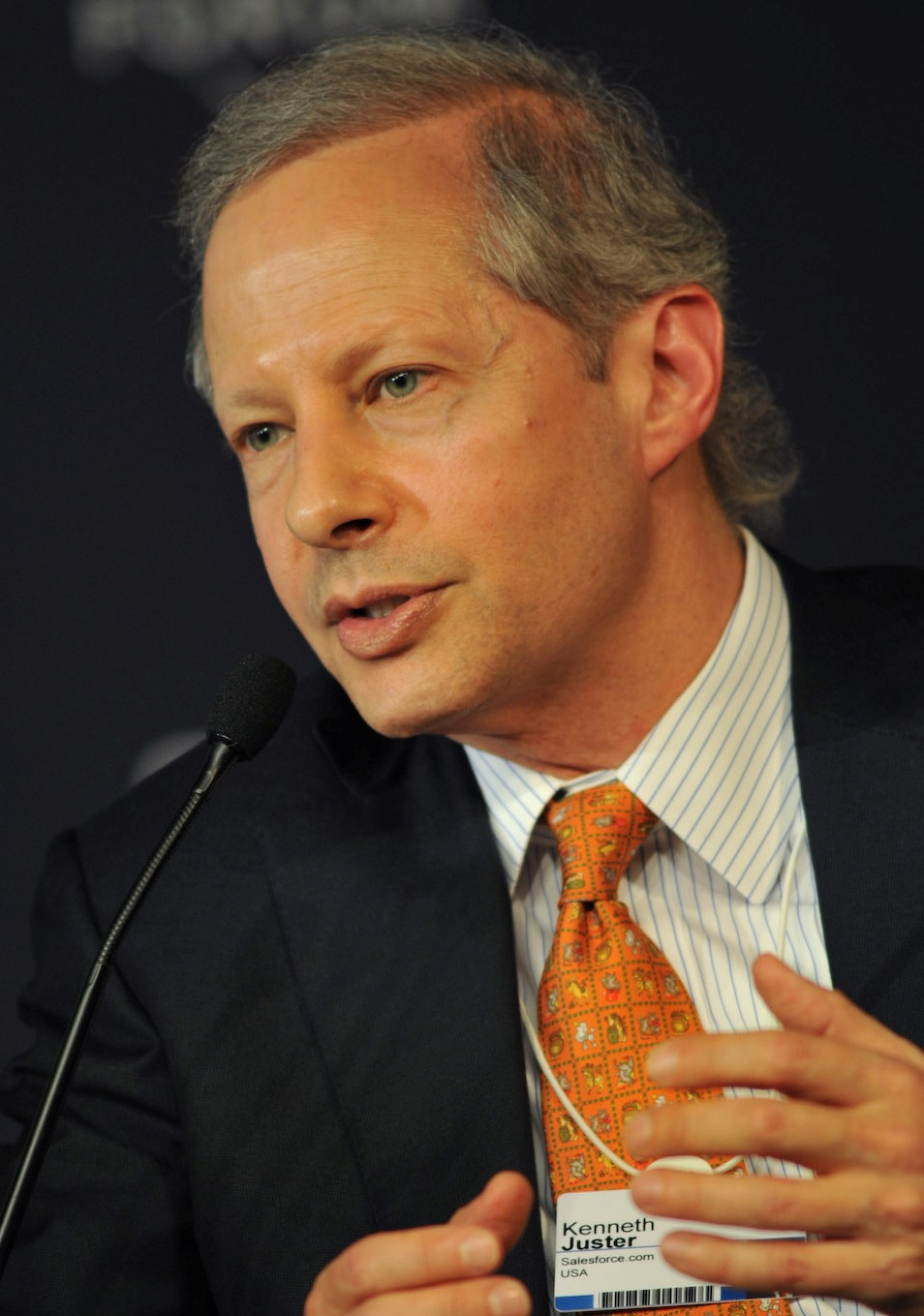
Juster at the 2009 India Economic Summit

From 2005 to 2010, Juster was executive vice president of law, policy, and corporate strategy at Salesforce. He was a section 16(b) officer of the company and a member of the company's five-member executive committee, led by chairman and CEO Marc Benioff. Juster oversaw the functions of corporate development, legal affairs, global public policy and strategy, enterprise risk management, human resources, internal audit, and worldwide real estate. He established the corporate development function and successfully executed the company's initial eight acquisitions and numerous strategic investments in start-up ventures. Juster was also centrally involved in the company's international expansion, including the growth of business in Japan and the establishment of operations in India. In addition, he shaped policy on privacy, security, and cross border data flows with governmental agencies.

Juster was a partner and managing director at the global investment firm Warburg Pincus from 2010 to 2017. He focused on a broad range of issues, including geopolitical risk, global public policy, and regulatory matters relating to the firm's investment activities and portfolio companies. Juster worked closely with investment teams involved in energy and technology. He also founded and led the firm's environmental, social, and governance program and worked on related initiatives with portfolio companies.

Juster was also a member of the U.S. President's Advisory Committee for Trade Policy and Negotiations from 2007 to 2010. In addition, he served as a non-resident fellow in the Future of Diplomacy Project at Harvard's Kennedy School of Government in 2010 and 2011.

=== Trump administration ===
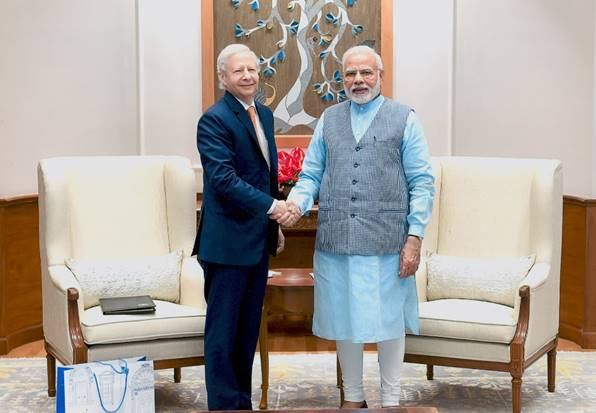
Ambassador Juster with Indian prime minister, Narendra Modi, 2018

Juster served as the deputy assistant to the president for international economic affairs and deputy director of the National Economic Council from January 2017 to June 2017. He was also a senior member of the National Security Council. In this role, Juster coordinated the administration's international economic policy and integrated it with national security and foreign policy. He helped establish the U.S.-Japan Economic Dialogue and the U.S.-U.K. Economic Dialogue. He contributed to the U.S. economic relationships with Canada, China, Germany, India, Saudi Arabia, and South Korea. Juster served as the president's representative and lead U.S. negotiator ("Sherpa") in the run-up to the 43rd G7 summit in Taormina, Italy.

Juster was selected in May 2017 by President Trump to be the next United States Ambassador to the Republic of India. President Trump formally nominated him on September 5, 2017. Juster was confirmed by unanimous consent of the U.S. Senate on November 2, 2017, and he was appointed and sworn in on November 3, 2017. He presented his credentials to the president of India on November 23, 2017, thereby becoming the 25th U.S. Ambassador to India.

During his tenure, Juster was involved with India on a broad range of issues across many sectors, including defense, trade and finance, energy, science and technology, aviation, health, agriculture, education, and space. He gave a widely acclaimed policy address in January 2018, which set out a vision for a durable U.S.-India strategic partnership. He participated in the development of the U.S. government's Indo-Pacific strategy and the relaunching of the Quadrilateral Security Dialogue (Quad) among Australia, India, Japan, and the United States. He also hosted a visit from the president of the United States in February 2020. Several major policy initiatives were concluded while Juster was U.S. Ambassador.

In the diplomatic sphere, the United States and India adopted the concept of a free and open Indo-Pacific region, which had first been enunciated by former Japanese Prime Minister Shinzo Abe, as the foundation for their regional policy. The United States and India also inaugurated an annual 2+2 Ministerial Dialogue between each country's Foreign and Defense Ministers and held three such meetings during Juster's tenure. At each, they signed pivotal defense agreements, including the Communications Compatibility and Security Agreement (COMCASA) to enhance the real-time exchange of sensitive information between the two militaries, the Industrial Security Annex (ISA) to the General Security of Military Information Agreement to share sensitive government information with industry and facilitate industrial collaboration, and the Basic Exchange and Cooperation Agreement (BECA) to share geospatial information, such as nautical and aeronautical data. Each of these agreements had been under negotiation for many years.

The United States also joined India and Japan for the first-ever Trilateral Summit in 2018, followed by a second summit meeting in 2019. In addition, the U.S. government led the way in revitalizing the Quad, with meetings held among the foreign ministers of Australia, India, Japan, and the United States in 2019 and 2020. The Quad provided greater cooperation on a positive agenda of regional issues, including maritime domain security, pandemic management, regional connectivity and high-quality infrastructure, humanitarian assistance and disaster relief, and cybersecurity.

In the defense sphere, the United States and India enhanced the complexity of a robust series of military exercises. Juster inaugurated the first-ever tri-services exercise, known as Tiger Triumph, in Visakhapatnam, India in 2019. This joint amphibious exercise is now conducted annually. In 2020, Australia participated for the first time since 2007 in the Malabar naval exercise, alongside India, Japan, and the United States. Also in 2020, the United States, for the first time, posted a naval officer at an Indian military facility (the Indian Ocean Information Fusion Centre), and India posted, for the first time, a naval officer at a U.S. Combatant Command (the U.S. Naval Forces Central Command in Bahrain). In addition, between 2017 and 2020, the Indian military inducted more than $3.5 billion of U.S.-origin platforms, including Apache attack helicopters, Chinook heavy-duty helicopters, and M777 ultra-lightweight artillery. Juster also participated in the inauguration of the Tata-Boeing Aerospace joint venture in Hyderabad, which will become the sole location for production of Apache helicopter fuselages.

In the fight against terrorism, the United States and India deepened their cooperation by establishing a U.S.-India Terrorist Designations Dialogue in 2017 to coordinate the designation of individual terrorists and groups. The two countries also inaugurated a Defense Cyber Dialogue in 2020, with working groups sharing best practices and exploring cyber capacity building.

In the economic and commercial sphere, trade and investment levels between the two countries achieved new highs. Two-way trade in goods and services went from $114 billion in 2016 to more than $146 billion in 2019, making the United States the number one trading partner of India, and India one of the top trading partners of the United States. In 2017, the United States co-sponsored with India the Global Entrepreneurship Summit in Hyderabad, and in 2018, the two countries held a Civil Aviation Summit. In that year, the U.S. government also granted India Strategic Trade Authorization, Tier One status (STA-1). This benefit is limited to America's closest allies and enabled India to access many highly-regulated U.S. technology items.

A key element of the economic relationship involved energy. The two countries launched a Strategic Energy Partnership in 2018, and India became the largest export destination for U.S. coal, the fourth-largest destination for U.S. crude oil, and the seventh-largest destination for U.S. liquefied natural gas. The United States also supported the modernization of India's power grid, and the development of energy storage technologies as well as renewables and biofuels.

Cooperation on health and science was another area of significant progress during Juster's tenure as Ambassador. The U.S.-India Health Dialogue met in 2019, addressing cooperation on research and innovation, health safety and security, communicable disease, non-communicable disease, health systems, and health policy. This provided the foundation for successful cooperation in the countries’ joint response to the COVID-19 pandemic. Public health specialists from the U.S. Centers for Disease Control and Prevention supported India's field response to the pandemic, assisting with technical guidance and training on contact tracing, diagnostic testing, and infection prevention and control at health facilities. In addition, American and Indian scientists collaborated to jointly develop and test vaccines, diagnostics, and treatments for COVID-19, with institutions and companies from both countries partnering to utilize India's large manufacturing capacity to produce approved COVID-19 vaccines.

Juster led Mission India through the COVID-19 pandemic, including the repatriation of over 5,800 Americans from across India. The United States and India also increased cooperation on a new threat to global health – antimicrobial resistance. Juster helped inaugurate India's Antimicrobial Resistance Hub in Kolkata in 2019.

Juster undertook several initiatives in cultural diplomacy. These included creating the Blue Room at Roosevelt House, the Ambassador's residence, with the restoration of Rajasthani-inspired murals designed by U.S. artist Karen Lukas, which were featured in the May-June 2019 India edition of Architectural Digest. In addition, in the sports arena, Juster made a memorable video in October 2019 featuring a series of trick basketball shots in welcoming the National Basketball Association to India for its first-ever exhibition games in Mumbai. ESPN subsequently featured the video on its show The Jump, with Rachel Nichols, Scottie Pippen, and Nick Friedell.

Juster interacted with the Tibetan community in India throughout his tenure, including meetings with His Holiness the 14th Dalai Lama in Dharamshala and Leh, Ladakh. Juster was the chief guest at the 85th birthday celebration of the Dalai Lama.

For his service as ambassador, Juster received the highest honors of several U.S. government agencies, including the Secretary of State's Distinguished Service Award and Medal, the Department of Defense's Distinguished Public Service Award, the director of National Intelligence's Exceptional Service Award, and the Department of Energy's Excellence Award.

== Juster Fellowships ==
Juster's opportunities to study and work abroad, including as an AFS Exchange Student in Thailand in 1971 and in doing research in Japan in 1975 under a grant from Harvard's Center for International Affairs, had a significant impact on him and his career, as did his internship at the National Security Council in 1978, with the financial support of Harvard's Kennedy School of Government. In appreciation of these opportunities and to provide similar opportunities for others, Juster established endowments in 2010 for two fellowships for students at Harvard University. One is the Kenneth I. Juster Fellowship Fund for Undergraduate Research and Travel, administered by the Weatherhead Center for International Affairs, for students whose work involves international, transnational, global, and comparative national issues. The other is the Kenneth I. Fellowship Fund to support the research of outstanding master's in public policy students specializing in international and global affairs at Harvard's Kennedy School of Government. Approximately five to ten students receive fellowships each year under each of these programs. In 2022, Juster created a third endowment, the Kenneth I. Juster International Fellowship, for students at the Harvard Law School, which will provide experiential learning opportunities for meritorious first- and second-year law students.

== Awards ==
Juster has received numerous honors and awards, including:

- U.S. Secretary of State's Distinguished Service Award and Medal, 2020, 1993
- U.S. Department of Defense's Distinguished Public Service Award and Medal, 2021
- U.S. Director of National Intelligence's Exceptional Service Award and Medal, 2020
- U.S. Department of Energy's Excellence Award, 2020
- National Association of Software and Service Companies (NASSCOM) Global Catalyst Award (for exemplary government service over four decades), 2020
- The Luxury League (India) Award for Outstanding Contributions Toward Cultural Diplomacy, 2019
- Officer's Cross of the Order of Merit from the president of the Federal Republic of Germany (for contributions to U.S.-German relations), 2006
- Secretary of Commerce's William C. Redfield Award and Medal, 2005
- Vasco Núñez de Balboa en el Grado de Gran Cruz Decoration and Medal from the president of Panama (for contributions to U.S.-Panama relations), 2004
- Blackwill Award from the U.S.-India Business Council (for contributions to U.S.-India relations), 2004
- Friendship Award from the U.S.-Panama Business Council (for contributions to U.S.-Panama relations), 2004, 2002
- Distinguished Alumnus of Scarsdale High School, 2007
- Distinguished Alumnus of Greenacres Elementary School, 2010

== Publications ==
Juster has published extensively on international economic and legal issues, including U.S. foreign policy, U.S.-India relations, international arbitration, international trade and economic sanctions, and cybersecurity. He co-authored the book Making Economic Policy: An Assessment of the National Economic Council (Brookings Institution, 1997). He also published “The Myth of Iraqgate” in Foreign Policy magazine (Spring 1994). Juster's research, analysis, and public discourse on the so-called Iraqgate scandal was instrumental in demonstrating that, contrary to media reporting and popular opinion, there was, in fact, no improper or illicit assistance by the U.S. Government to Iraq in the lead up to the 1991 Gulf War. An Independent Counsel appointed by the U.S. Attorney General in the Clinton Administration subsequently investigated the Iraqgate allegations and validated all elements of Juster's analysis.

== Personal life ==
Juster is married to Alyssa Bliss Juster, an attorney and interior designer, and has two stepdaughters, Julia and Ana.

Diplomatic posts
Preceded by Richard Verma	United States Ambassador to India; 2017–2021	Succeeded by Donald L. Heflin; Chargé d'Affaires
