= Emma Doyle =

American political advisor

White House Principal Deputy Chief of Staff
- In office January 3, 2019 – April 21, 2020
- President: Donald Trump
- Leader: Mick Mulvaney; Mark Meadows
- Preceded by: Zachary Fuentes
- Succeeded by: John Fleming (Planning and Implementation)

Personal details
- Born: Emma Katherine King; 1987 or 1988 (age 37–38) Pittsburgh, Pennsylvania, U.S.
- Party: Republican
- Education: Georgetown University (BA, MS)

Emma Katherine King Doyle is an American political advisor and former lobbyist who served as the White House Principal Deputy Chief of Staff in the first administration of U.S. President Donald Trump.

== Early life and education ==
Doyle was born and raised in Pittsburgh, Pennsylvania. She earned a Bachelor of Arts and Master of Science degree in finance, both from Georgetown University.

== Career ==
Prior to her appointment as Principal Deputy Chief of Staff, Doyle served as Chief of Staff to Mick Mulvaney when he was Director of the Office of Management and Budget. She previously served as Government Relations Manager for the Ford Motor Company, as a legislative assistant to Mulvaney when he was a Member of the House of Representatives, and as a legislative assistant to Senator Pat Toomey.

At a February 2020 meeting with President Trump and Mulvaney, Doyle objected to Trump's plan to appoint John McEntee as Director of Presidential Personnel. "Mr. President, I have never said no to anything you've asked me to do, but I am asking you to please reconsider this. I don't think it's a good idea," she said. Trump responded by screaming, "You people never fucking listen to me. You're going to fucking do what I tell you to do."

On April 20, 2020, it was announced that Doyle would leave her position as White House Deputy Chief of Staff to become the Deputy Chief of Staff for Policy in the Office of the First Lady.

== Personal life ==
In 2016, Doyle married Brett William Doyle, a former legislative assistant for Senator Pat Toomey. In 2020, Brett worked as the Senior Director for Congressional Affairs in the Office of the United States Trade Representative.
