= Raj Shah =

American political aide (born 1985)

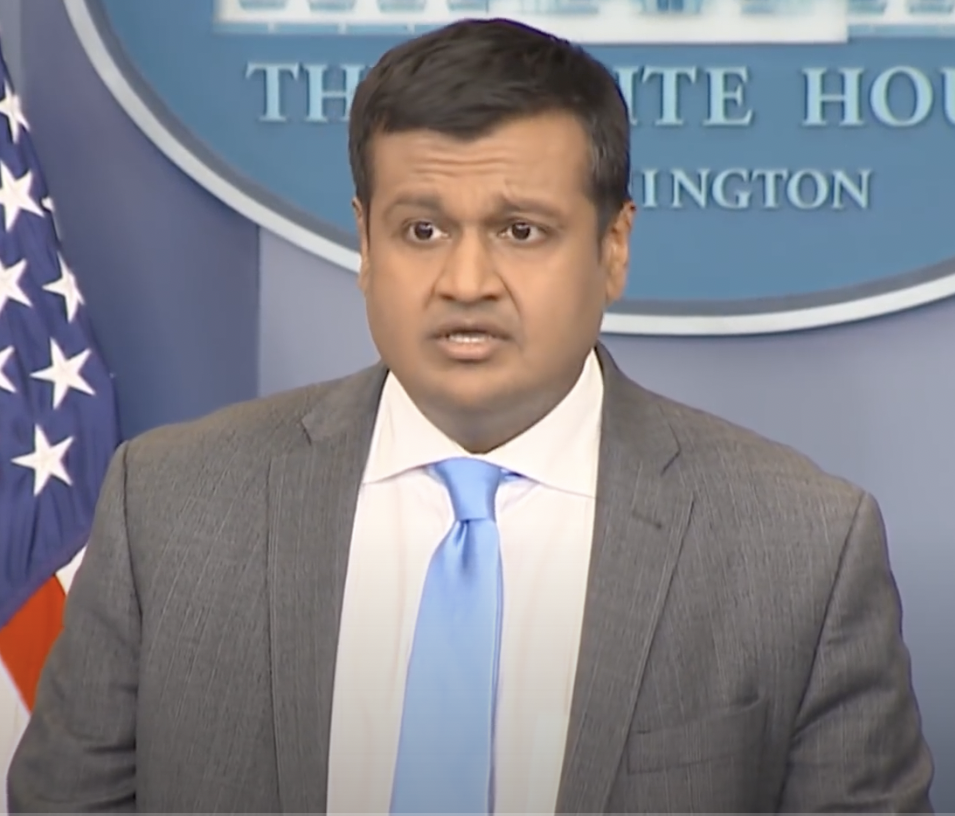

White House Deputy Press Secretary
- In office September 12, 2017 – January 14, 2019
- President: Donald Trump
- Secretary: Sarah Huckabee Sanders
- Preceded by: Sarah Huckabee Sanders
- Succeeded by: Hogan Gidley

Personal details
- Born: 1984 (age 41–42) Connecticut
- Party: Republican
- Education: Cornell University (AB)

Raj Shah (born 1984) is an American political aide who served as the White House Deputy Press Secretary and Deputy Assistant to the President from 2017 to 2019. Before joining the Trump administration, Shah was in charge of opposition research at the Republican National Committee. He is currently deputy chief of staff for communications for House Speaker Mike Johnson.

== Early life ==
Shah's parents are ethnic Gujaratis who moved from Mumbai to the United States in the 1970s. He was born and raised in Connecticut, where his father worked as an engineer and his mother as a dentist.

Shah attended Brien McMahon High School, and was named an Ettinger Scholar in Norwalk, Connecticut. In 2006, he graduated from Cornell University with a bachelor's degree in government.

== Career ==
Shah volunteered in Bridgeport for U.S. Representative Chris Shays during high school, and interned for U.S. Senator Joe Lieberman and others in Washington, D.C. as his interest in politics developed. Finding that he disagreed with Democrats in his family and those he met during internships, Shah cast his first vote for George W. Bush in 2004, and interned in the White House in 2005. While working as a campaign spokesman for New Mexico Republican gubernatorial candidate Susana Martinez in 2010, he was arrested for DWI and reckless driving, and was immediately terminated from his position.

By the 2012 presidential election cycle, Shah was deputy research director at the Republican National Committee (RNC). He has said that he learned in that job what not to do in the 2016 election. He worked with the campaign staff and manager of the Mitt Romney campaign and others to plan how to defeat Hillary Clinton well before she announced her candidacy. Shah co-founded America Rising, "a right-leaning political action committee that produces opposition research on Democratic candidates". According to Shah, the playbook on the Clinton campaign was

very deep, it's very broad. We had the time and resources to dig through it all and kind of pick and choose how we wanted to go about the general election. I think it played to our benefit. When the email issue broke, we knew what buttons to push. When issues surrounding the foundation came up we knew where to look. We filed over 550 FOI requests and we sued the government half a dozen times to release records. All these sorts of things were years in the making. It was a huge coordinated effort.

As the RNC's head of opposition research in 2016, Shah led a team of experts to carry out research against Clinton. Then-incoming White House Chief of Staff and outgoing RNC head Reince Priebus said that Shah would be among the key leaders in helping to implement Trump's agenda. Before the election, Shah called Trump "deplorable" and the release of the Donald Trump Access Hollywood tape "some justice"; he also helped get embarrassing footage of Trump for a Jeb Bush campaign commercial.

Shah was one of the early staffers on duty in the White House on Inauguration Day, attending to reporters' inquiries and beginning establishment of the communications apparatus (emails of 'OCIO' distributions of the address and the first White House pool report were early to go out) in the West Wing and the Eisenhower Executive Office Building.

Shah left the White House in January 2019. In July 2019, Fox Corporation announced that he had joined the company as a senior vice president. The New York Times reported in 2020 that he had been tasked with running a project to discredit critics of Fox News.

As vice president at Fox News, Shah wrote a memo for Tucker Carlson Tonight announcing that anchors should immediately label President Joe Biden's policy announcements "socialism", writing: "Framing any and all policy announcements as 'socialism' and taken from an AOC-Bernie Sanders playbook will likely animate Tucker's core audience".

In November 2023, Shah was appointed deputy chief of staff for communications for Mike Johnson.

== See also ==
- Indians in the New York City metropolitan area
- Members of the Council on Foreign Relations
- List of Cornell University alumni
