= Everett Eissenstat =

American businessman

Executive Vice President of the Inter-American Development Bank
- Incumbent
- Assumed office June 2026

Deputy Director of the National Economic Council
- In office June 2017 – July 2018

Personal details
- Party: Republican
- Spouse: Janet Eissenstat (m. 1993)
- Education: Oklahoma State University (BA); University of Texas, Austin (MA); University of Oklahoma (JD)

Everett Eissenstat is an American lawyer, and current executive vice president of the Inter-American Development Bank. He functions as the Bank's chief operating officer, with responsibility for its operations and oversight of senior management. He previously served as Deputy Director of the National Economic Council.

From June 2017 - July 2018. Eissenstat served as deputy director of the National Economic Council and Deputy Assistant to the President for International Economic Affairs in the first administration of U.S. President Donald Trump, where he represented the President at the G7, G20, and Asia-Pacific Economic Cooperation summits. He also served on the National Security Council. Eissenstat succeeded Kenneth Juster, who was nominated by Donald Trump to serve as the United States Ambassador to India.

Eissenstat has also served twice as Chief International Trade Counsel for the United States Senate Committee on Finance (2001-2006; 2011-2017). He has also served as assistant U.S. Trade Representative for the Western Hemisphere, focusing on trade agreements with Chile, Colombia, Panama, and Peru.

In the private sector, Eissenstat was a partner at Squire Patton Boggs and senior vice president of global public policy for General Motors.

== Education ==
Eissenstat holds a J. D. from the University of Oklahoma, a Master of Arts in Latin American Studies from the University of Texas at Austin, and a Bachelor of Science in political science and Spanish from Oklahoma State University.

== Work with Congress ==
Prior to his career with the National Economic Council, Eissenstat served as a Legislative Director for former Arizona Congressman Jim Kolbe, who retired in 2007. Eissenstat served as Assistant U.S. Trade Representative for the Americas from 2006 to 2011, and as Chief International Trade Counsel for the Senate Finance Committee.

== National Economic Council ==
As the Deputy Assistant to the President for International Economic Affairs, Eissenstat served as the President's personal representative for international economic affairs. He attended the 44th G7 summit at La Malbaie, Quebec and was part of the China delegation.

== General Motors ==
In June 2018, it was announced that Eissenstat would leave the Trump administration. Shortly after, he was hired by General Motors to serve as senior vice president of global public policy, reporting directly to CEO Mary Barra. Eissenstat departed General Motors in August 2021.
