= Taylor Weyeneth =

American government official (born 1993)

Taylor P. Weyeneth

Chief of Staff for the U.S. House of Representatives
- In office March 13, 2023 – present

Chief of Staff for the New York State Assembly
- In office January 1, 2021 – January 2, 2022

Deputy Chief of Staff for the Office of National Drug Control Policy
- In office March 13, 2017 – February 27, 2018
- President: Donald Trump

Deputy White House Liaison for the United States Department of the Treasury
- In office January 23, 2017 – March 13, 2017
- President: Donald Trump

Personal details
- Born: August 30, 1993 (age 33) Morristown, New Jersey, U.S.
- Party: Republican
- Education: Skaneateles High School
- Alma mater: St. John’s University
- Website: 20kstrategies.com

Taylor P. Weyeneth (born August 30, 1993) is an American Chief of Staff in the U.S. House of Representatives, former Deputy Chief of Staff for the Office of National Drug Control Policy (ONDCP), and White House Liaison who served from January 23, 2017, to February 27, 2018, under President Donald Trump. The Deputy Chief of Staff position is considered to be the "second most important position" in the ONDCP. Before taking the position at ONDCP, Weyeneth served as the Deputy White House Liaison at the United States Department of the Treasury, as an advisor to the executive director of the Presidential Transition Team, and began his political career as a campaign staffer for Donald Trump during the 2016 presidential election.

In 2018, Weyeneth stepped down from his position at the ONDCP due to controversy surrounding his age and credentials.

== Career ==
Following his graduation from college in 2016, Weyeneth worked on the Trump presidential campaign. Preceding the presidential election in 2016, Weyeneth became the advisor to Rick Dearborn, the executive director of the Presidential Transition Team. After President Trump was inaugurated, Taylor was hired to be the Deputy White House Liaison at the United States Department of the Treasury, where he served through the confirmation of Secretary of the Treasury Steven Mnuchin. After the secretary was confirmed, Weyeneth accepted a role in the White House as the White House Liaison to the Drug Czar.

After months on the job at the White House Drug Policy Office, Weyeneth was promoted to Deputy Chief of Staff. After nearly a year of service at the Office of National Drug Control Policy, Weyeneth was faced with controversy due to his age and lack of experience in an executive position. When Weyeneth's role at the ONDCP was revealed, "outrage ensued", as "questions quickly arose about his qualifications after multiple discrepancies popped up on several of his résumés and reports surfaced that another job he held at a New York law firm... [which] ended after Weyeneth failed to show up for work." Business Insider wrote Weyeneth had "no experience with drug policy, government service, or law, unlike his predecessors in previous administrations." After initially being demoted to administrative work, Weyeneth moved to the Department of Housing and Urban Development in a mid-level position for a brief time. He resigned that position at age 24.

Once leaving government, Weyeneth began a consulting firm based in Washington, D.C. by the name of 20K Strategies, LLC that deals with public policy, strategic communications, and corporate restructuring.

Weyeneth started a Political Action Committee in December 2018 called End the Stigma PAC, dealing with substance use disorders and mental health disorders.

== Personal life ==
Taylor attended Skaneateles High School and was a state champion on their soccer team in 2010. He graduated in May 2016 from St. John's University, where he was vice-president of his fraternity, Kappa Sigma.
