= John Mashburn =

American political advisor

Deputy White House Cabinet Secretary
- In office January 20, 2017 – April 2018
- President: Donald Trump

Personal details
- Party: Republican

John Kinney Mashburn has since October 2018 been an adviser of the Secretary of the Department of Veterans Affairs – Robert Wilkie. Previously, he had been a senior advisor for six months to the Secretary of Energy – Rick Perry.

Between January 20, 2017 and mid-April 2018, he was the White House Deputy Cabinet Secretary and Special Assistant to U.S. President Donald Trump on a salary of $130,000 per annum.

He had been a policy director for the Trump Campaign and also a congressional aide to U.S. Senator Jesse Helms.
