= Bertha Madras =

American academic

Bertha Kalifon Madras is a Canadian professor of psychobiology in the Department of Psychiatry at Harvard University. She also chairs the Division of Neurochemistry at Harvard Medical School, Harvard University. She has worked as associate director for public education in the division on Addictions at Harvard Medical School. Madras's research focuses on drug addiction (particularly the effects of cocaine), ADHD, and Parkinson's disease.

Madras earned a Bachelor of Science degree in biochemistry with honors from McGill University in 1963. As a J.B. Collop Fellow of the Faculty of Medicine, she earned a PhD in biochemistry (metabolism and pharmacology, including hallucinogens) from McGill University in 1967. She completed postdoctoral fellowships in biochemistry at Tufts University/Cornell University Medical College (1966–1967) as well as at the Massachusetts Institute of Technology (1967–1969).

Madras was appointed a research associate at the Massachusetts Institute of Technology (1972–1974) and an assistant professor in the Departments of Pharmacology and Psychiatry at the University of Toronto. She joined the Harvard Medical School as an assistant professor in 1986 and was subsequently promoted to associate professor, then full professor, with a cross-appointment to the Department of Psychiatry at the Massachusetts General Hospital. Madras also founded and chaired the Division of Neurochemistry at Harvard Medical School's New England Primate Research Center—a multidisciplinary translational research program that spans chemical design, molecular and cellular biology, behavioral biology, and brain imaging approaches. She directs the Laboratory of Addiction Neurobiology, McLean Hospital, in conjunction with the Harvard Brain Science initiative.

== Personal life ==
She is married to Peter Madras. They have two daughters, two sons-in-law, and five grandchildren.

== Public policy work ==
Madras served as the Deputy Director for Demand Reduction for the White House Office of National Drug Control Policy (ONDCP). She was nominated by President George W. Bush in July 2005 and unanimously confirmed by the United States Senate in 2006.

During Madras's time in the ONDCP, she was involved in introducing new diagnostic codes for addiction screening and brief intervention (SBI), which were intended to help doctors secure reimbursement for SBI carried out for Medicaid patients. These new diagnostic codes were adopted by ten states in July 2008. A proponent of using SBI for early intervention with addiction, Madras advocated extending insurance coverage for SBI to federal workers covered by the Federal Employees Health Benefits Program; this coverage was announced by the ONDCP in April 2008.

== Research ==
Madras has authored over 130 scientific manuscripts and book chapters. In 2003, she co-edited the book Cell Biology of Addiction. She later co-edited two more books, The Effects of Drug Abuse on the Human Nervous System (2013) and Imaging of the Human Brain in Health and Disease (2013).

In October 2008, Madras and five other researchers published a study on the effect of the federally funded Screening, Brief Intervention, Referral to Treatment (SBIRT) service program on illicit drug use. The study involved various patient populations in six different states over six months.

As of the end of 2024, Madras and her collaborators have been granted nineteen U.S. and twenty-seven international patents.

== Honors ==
Her co-discovery of altropane was recognized by the Association of University Technology Managers in 2006.
