= Hogan Gidley =

American political aide

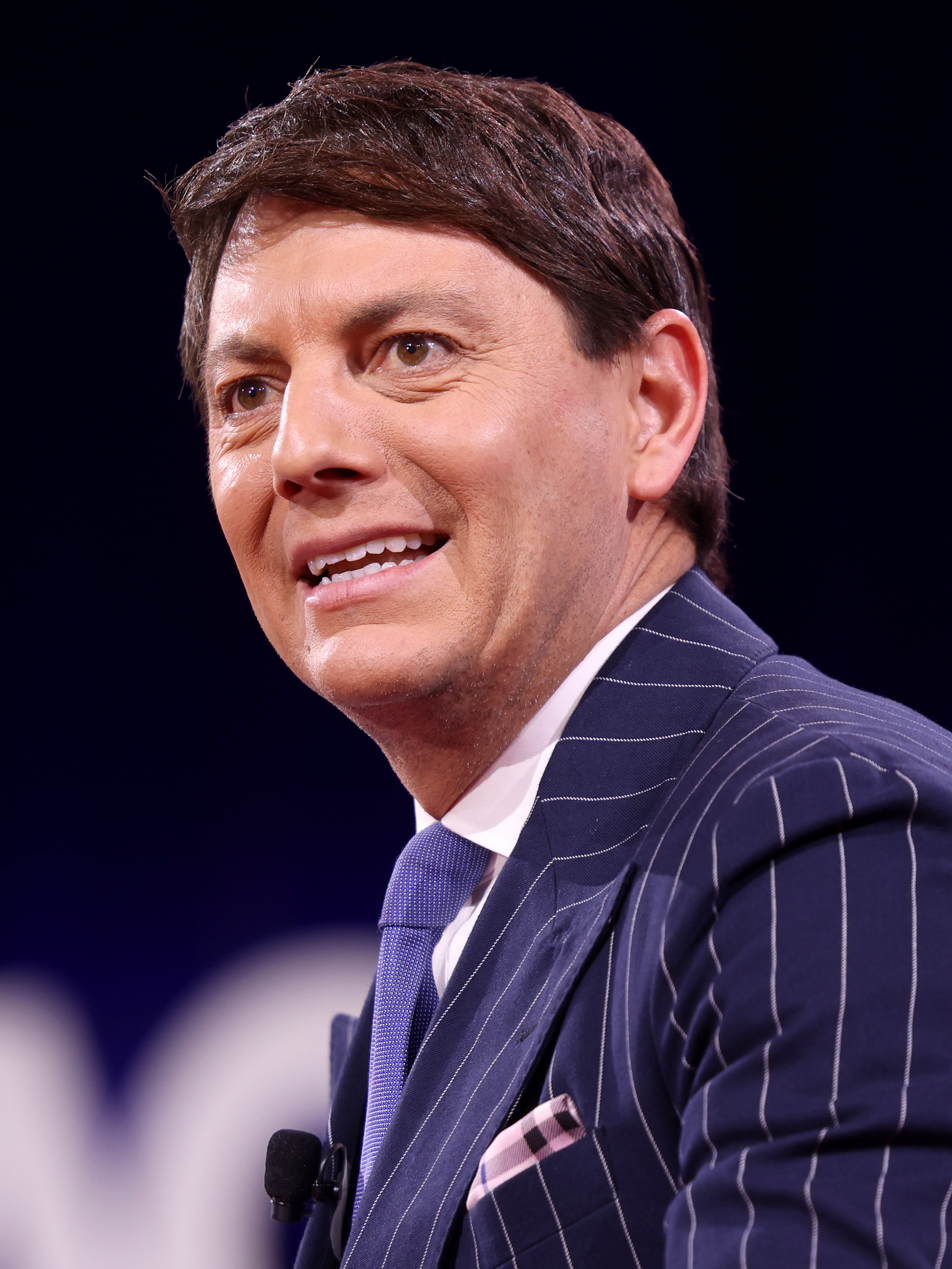

White House Deputy Press Secretary
- In office January 31, 2019 – July 1, 2020; Acting: January 14, 2019 – January 31, 2019
- President: Donald Trump
- Secretary: Sarah Huckabee Sanders; Stephanie Grisham; Kayleigh McEnany
- Preceded by: Raj Shah
- Succeeded by: Brian R. Morgenstern

Personal details
- Born: John Hogan Gidley; September 16, 1976 (age 50) El Dorado, Arkansas, U.S.
- Party: Republican
- Education: University of Mississippi (BA)

John Hogan Gidley is an American political aide who served as White House Deputy Press Secretary from 2019 to 2020 in the Donald Trump administration. In July 2020, Gidley became the press secretary of Trump's reelection campaign. Gidley currently serves as vice-chair of secure elections policy at the America First Policy Institute.

== Early life and career ==
Gidley was born in El Dorado, Arkansas. He graduated from the University of Mississippi with a degree in broadcast journalism and a minor in political science in 1998. In college, Gidley was a member of the Sigma Chi fraternity.

== Career ==
Gidley served as the director of Huck PAC. His past activities include director of media operations for Arkansas Governor Mike Huckabee, Executive Director of the South Carolina Republican Party, Press Secretary to the David Beasley for Senate campaign, the Karen Floyd for Superintendent of Education campaign, and U.S. Senator Elizabeth Dole's campaign committee. He was director of communications for Rick Santorum's 2012 presidential campaign.

=== Trump administration ===
The Trump administration announced on October 10, 2017, that Gidley would serve as Deputy Press Secretary, and he started his job at the White House the next day.

In February 2018, after Special Counsel Mueller's indictment of 13 Russian nationals appeared, in the administration's view, to prove that no collusion occurred between the Trump campaign and Russia, Gidley said that there "are two groups that have created chaos more than the Russians and that’s the Democrats and the mainstream media.

In January 2019, Gidley was promoted to deputy press secretary, succeeding Raj Shah. In June 2019, he was considered a candidate for White House Press Secretary when Sarah Sanders announced she was stepping down from the role. Stephanie Grisham was named to the position, with Gidley continuing as deputy press secretary.

On September 5, 2019, Gidley and Grisham published an opinion piece in The Washington Times, entitled "The Washington Post's lost summer", which criticized the Post for publishing opinion pieces as news that pushed what they called a "lost summer" narrative about the alleged lack of Trump's accomplishments, even though, as Gidley and Grisham showed in their piece, the Post had elsewhere reported on several Trump accomplishments, including a link to a Post story titled "Trump becomes first sitting president to set foot into North Korea."

In June 2020, Gidley resigned as deputy press secretary to serve as the national press secretary of the Trump reelection campaign. He was succeeded as deputy press secretary by Brian R. Morgenstern, a former official in the United States Department of the Treasury.

In January 2021, after being asked by Fox's Bill Hemmer whether Donald Trump had been emasculated by his removal from social media, Gidley called Trump "the most masculine person to ever hold the White House."
