= Nesheiwat =

Nesheiwat is a surname. Notable people with the surname include:

- Jaclyn Nesheiwat, later known as Jaclyn Stapp (born 1980), American fashion model
- Janette Nesheiwat (born 1980), American physician and nominee for United States surgeon general
- Julia Nesheiwat, American academic and former government official
