= Ernest Moniz =

13th United States Secretary of Energy

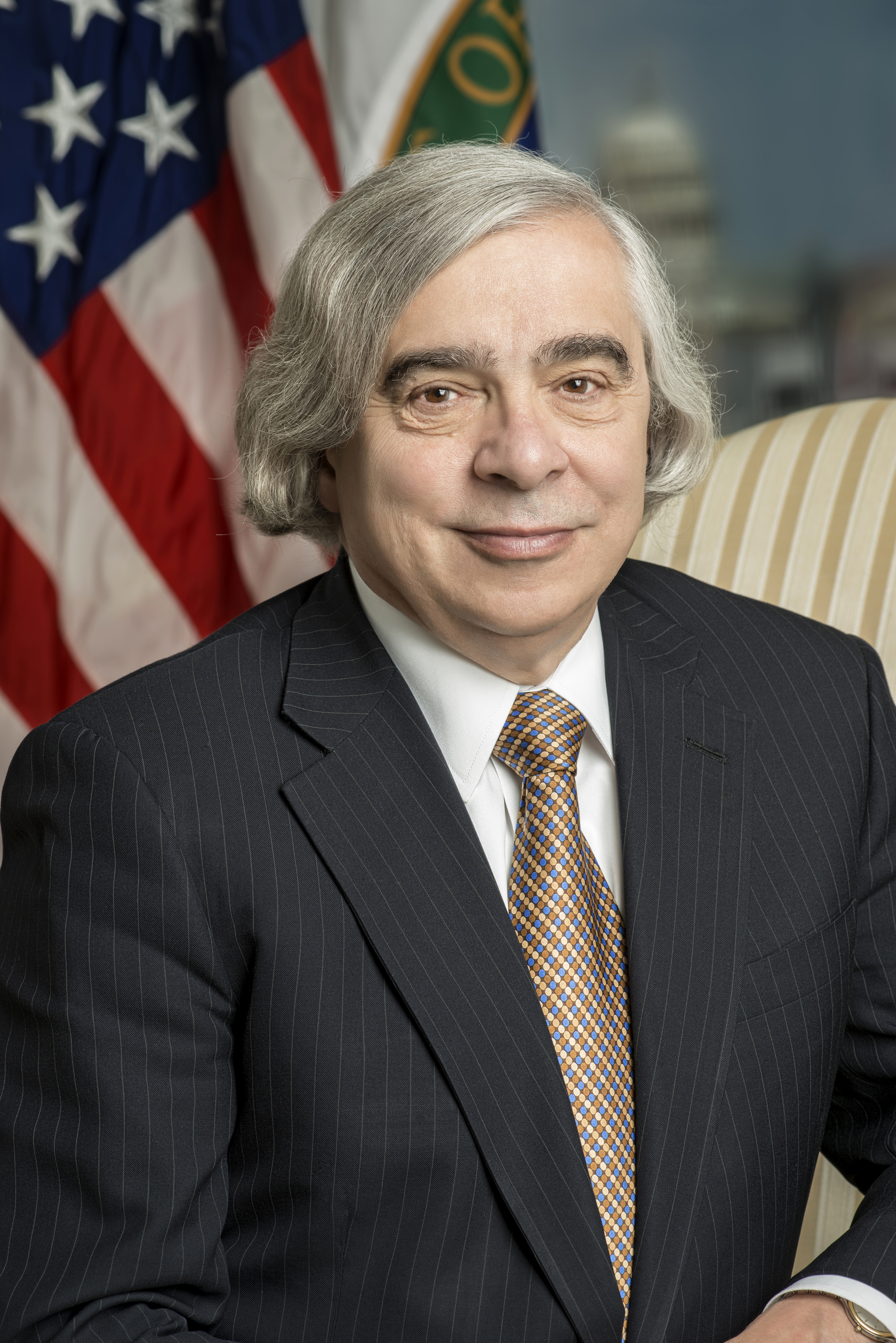
- Official portrait, 2013

13th United States Secretary of Energy
- In office May 21, 2013 – January 20, 2017
- President: Barack Obama
- Deputy: Daniel Poneman; Elizabeth Sherwood-Randall
- Preceded by: Steven Chu
- Succeeded by: Rick Perry

Under Secretary of Energy for Energy and Environment
- In office October 29, 1997 – January 20, 2001
- President: Bill Clinton
- Preceded by: Steven Chu
- Succeeded by: Robert G. Card

Personal details
- Born: Ernest Jeffrey Moniz; December 22, 1944 (age 81) Fall River, Massachusetts, U.S.
- Party: Democratic
- Spouse: Naomi Moniz
- Education: Boston College (BS); Stanford University (MS, PhD)

Ernest Jeffrey Moniz, GCIH (Portuguese: [muˈniʃ]; born December 22, 1944) is an American nuclear physicist and former government official. From May 2013 to January 2017, he served as the 13th United States secretary of energy in the Obama administration. Prior to this, Moniz served as associate director for science in the Office of Science and Technology Policy in the Executive Office of the President of the United States from 1995 to 1997 and undersecretary of energy from 1997 to 2001 during the Clinton administration. He is currently the co-chair and CEO of the Nuclear Threat Initiative (NTI), as well as president and CEO of the Energy Futures Initiative (EFI), a nonprofit organization funded by the natural gas industry that works on climate and energy technology issues, which he co-founded in 2017.

He is one of the founding members of The Cyprus Institute, has served at MIT as the Cecil and Ida Green professor of physics and engineering systems, director of the Energy Initiative and director of the Laboratory for Energy and the Environment. Before his appointment as secretary of energy, he served in a variety of advisory capacities, including at BP, General Electric and the King Abdullah Petroleum Studies and Research Center in Riyadh, Saudi Arabia.

== Early life and education ==
Moniz was born in Fall River, Massachusetts, the grandson of immigrants from São Miguel Island, Azores. He graduated from Durfee High School in Fall River in 1962, where he was a member of the National Honor Society and was the president of the school's math club. After graduating from high school, Moniz attended Boston College, where he received his Bachelor of Science summa cum laude in physics. In 1972, he received his Master of Science and Ph.D. degrees in theoretical physics from Stanford University.

== Career ==
After graduating from Stanford, Moniz joined the faculty of the Massachusetts Institute of Technology (MIT) in 1973, serving as head of the department of physics from 1991 to 1995 and as director of the Bates Linear Accelerator Center. He co-chairs the MIT research council. He served in the Clinton administration as associate director for science in the Office of Science and Technology Policy in the Executive Office of the President from 1995 to 1997.

Moniz worked in the United States Department of Energy, serving as undersecretary of energy from 1997 to 2001. Moniz was one of the founding members of The Cyprus Institute in 2005, where he and other scholars undertook the coordination, research and planning of the project. In 2013, he received the honorary degree Doctor Honoris Causa from the Universidad Pontificia Comillas de Madrid in recognition of his research on energy policies and technologies.

He oversaw the Massachusetts Institute of Technology Energy Initiative Report in 2011, which promoted natural gas as a clean energy source, and led to its promotion in the Obama administration and the fracking boom. The report conflicted with earlier research that showed that leaks from natural gas were more harmful to the climate. The study was funded by a non-profit created by the natural gas industry.

=== U.S. Secretary of Energy (2013–2017) ===
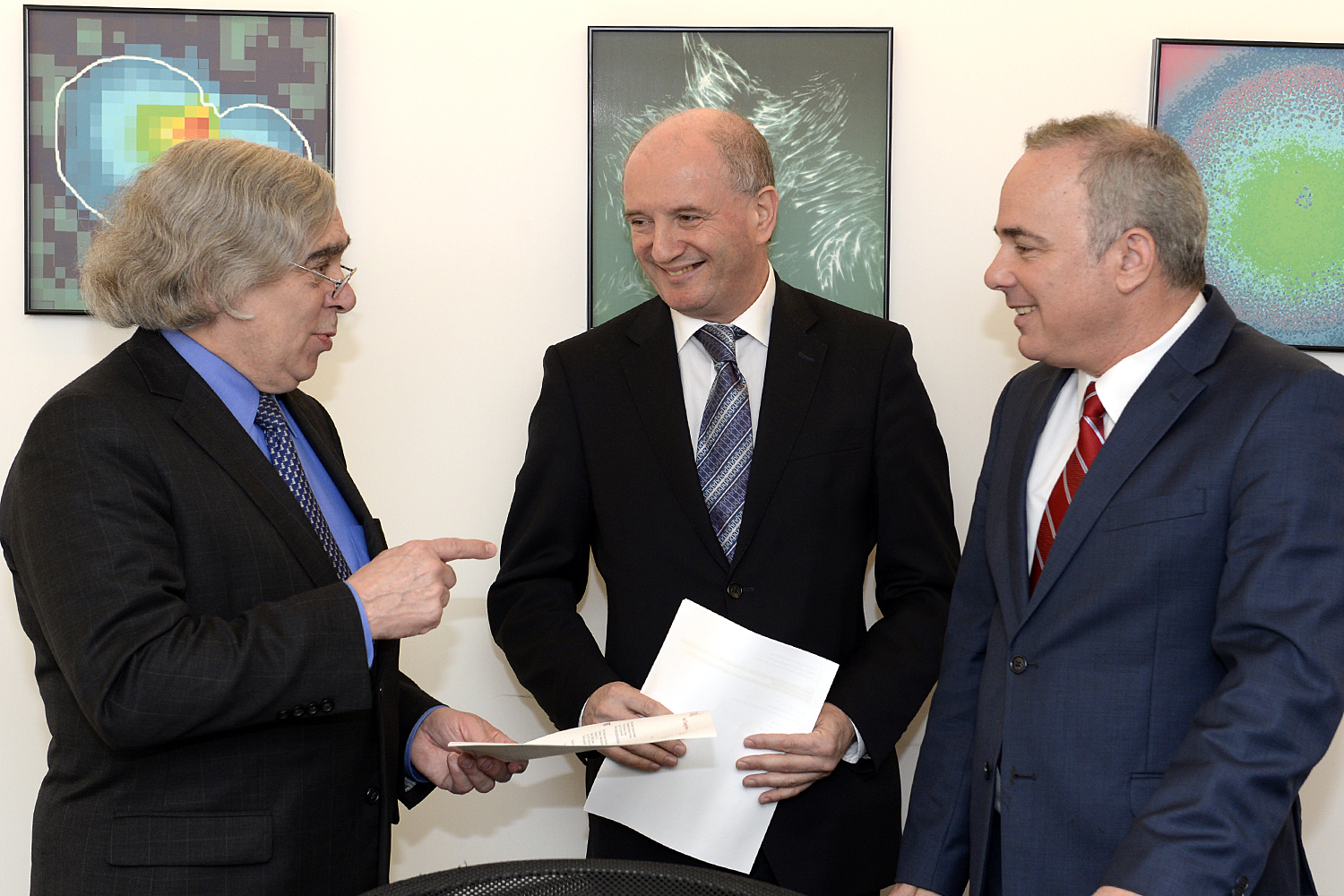
Moniz on visit to Israel with Daniel Zajfman (center), president of the Weizmann Institute

On May 16, 2013, his appointment was confirmed on a 97–0 vote by the Senate. He succeeded Steven Chu as secretary of energy. Moniz was sworn in as energy secretary on May 21, 2013 by deputy energy secretary Daniel Poneman.

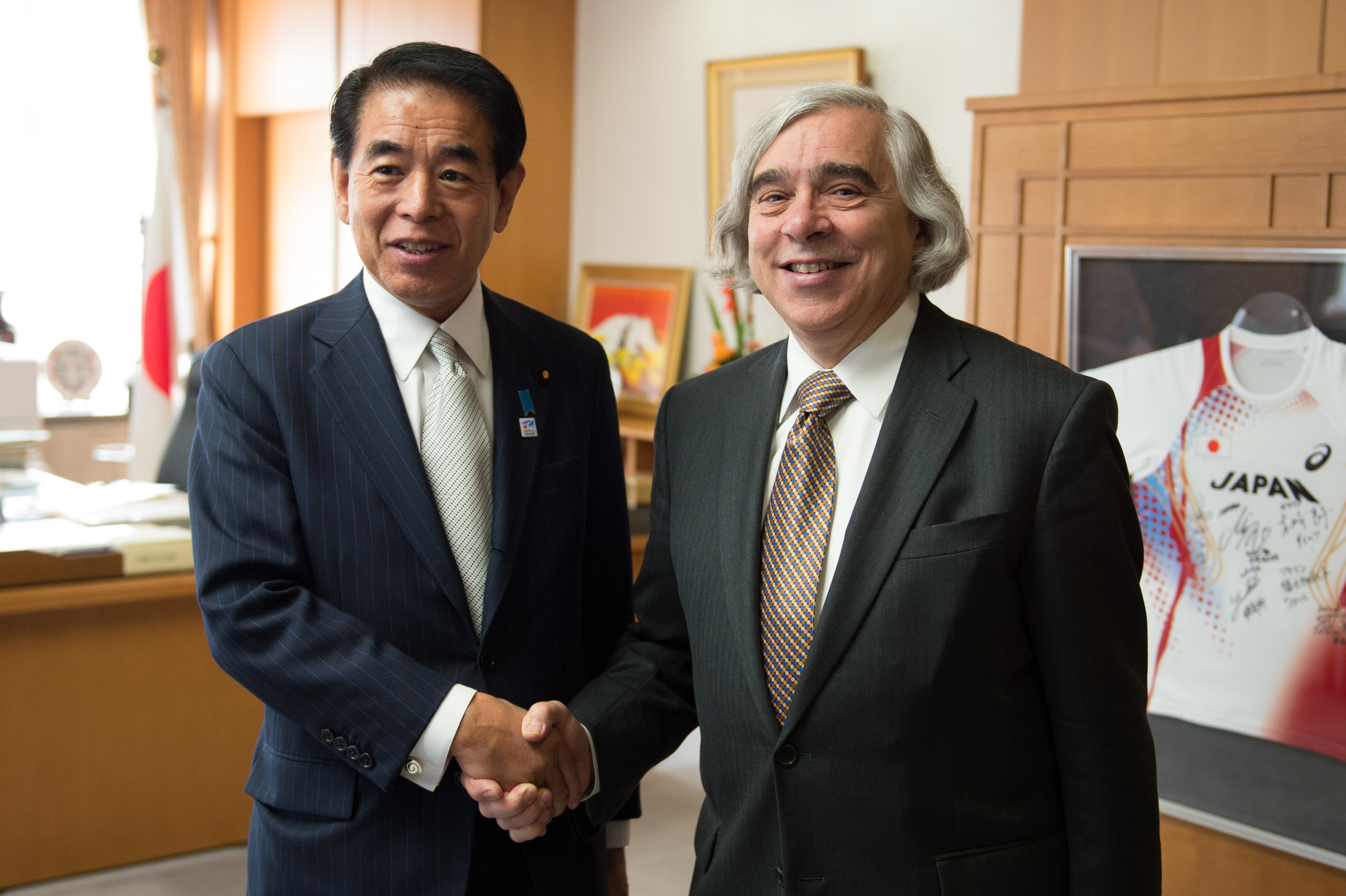
Moniz with Japanese minister of Education, Culture, Sports, Science and Technology Hakubun Shimomura in 2013

Moniz played a crucial role in negotiations toward a comprehensive agreement on the Iranian nuclear program, directly negotiating technical details with the Iranian atomic energy minister Ali Akbar Salehi, an MIT graduate, and reassuring President Obama that concessions important to the Iranians would not pose a major threat. The comprehensive agreement between Iran and the so-called "P5+1" (which includes the 5 permanent members of the UN Security Council, plus Germany and a representative from the European Union) was finalized on July 14, 2015, to much fanfare and criticism.

Some environmental advocacy groups opposed Moniz' nomination due to his support for nuclear power and fracking as a "bridge fuel" to ease the transition away from coal energy. Others opposed him because he had previously served on the board of a number of energy companies like BP and ICF, although Obama noted that he had nominated Moniz in part specifically because of his track record of working with industry.

=== Career after office ===
In June 2017, Moniz became co-chairman and chief executive officer of the Nuclear Threat Initiative, a nonpartisan, nonprofit organization working to prevent catastrophic attacks with weapons of mass destruction and disruption—nuclear, biological, radiological and cyber. He also founded a nonprofit organization called the Energy Futures Initiative, where he has promoted the concept of a "Green Real Deal" as a "practical, science-based" solution to climate change. The concept attracted praise in the media from The New York Times columnist Thomas Friedman and criticism from Greenpeace USA.

In 2018, Moniz was hired by the government of Saudi Arabia to serve as member of the global advisory board of the Neom project, a $500 billion planned megacity in the Tabuk Region.

In November 2020, Moniz was named a candidate for energy secretary in the Biden Administration. However, former governor of Michigan Jennifer Granholm was chosen instead.

In June 2023, he was again awarded a Doctor Honoris Causa honorary degree, now from the University of the Azores, in the Azores, Portugal, in recognition of Moniz's "unique professional, political, civic and cultural career [as] a remarkable personality who has made important contributions in the exercise of positions and functions of high responsibility and impact at international level".

He has served on the Board of Advisors for Angeleno Group, a private equity and venture capital firm focused on sustainable energy investments, since 2002, with a hiatus during his tenure as U.S. Secretary of Energy.

== Honors ==
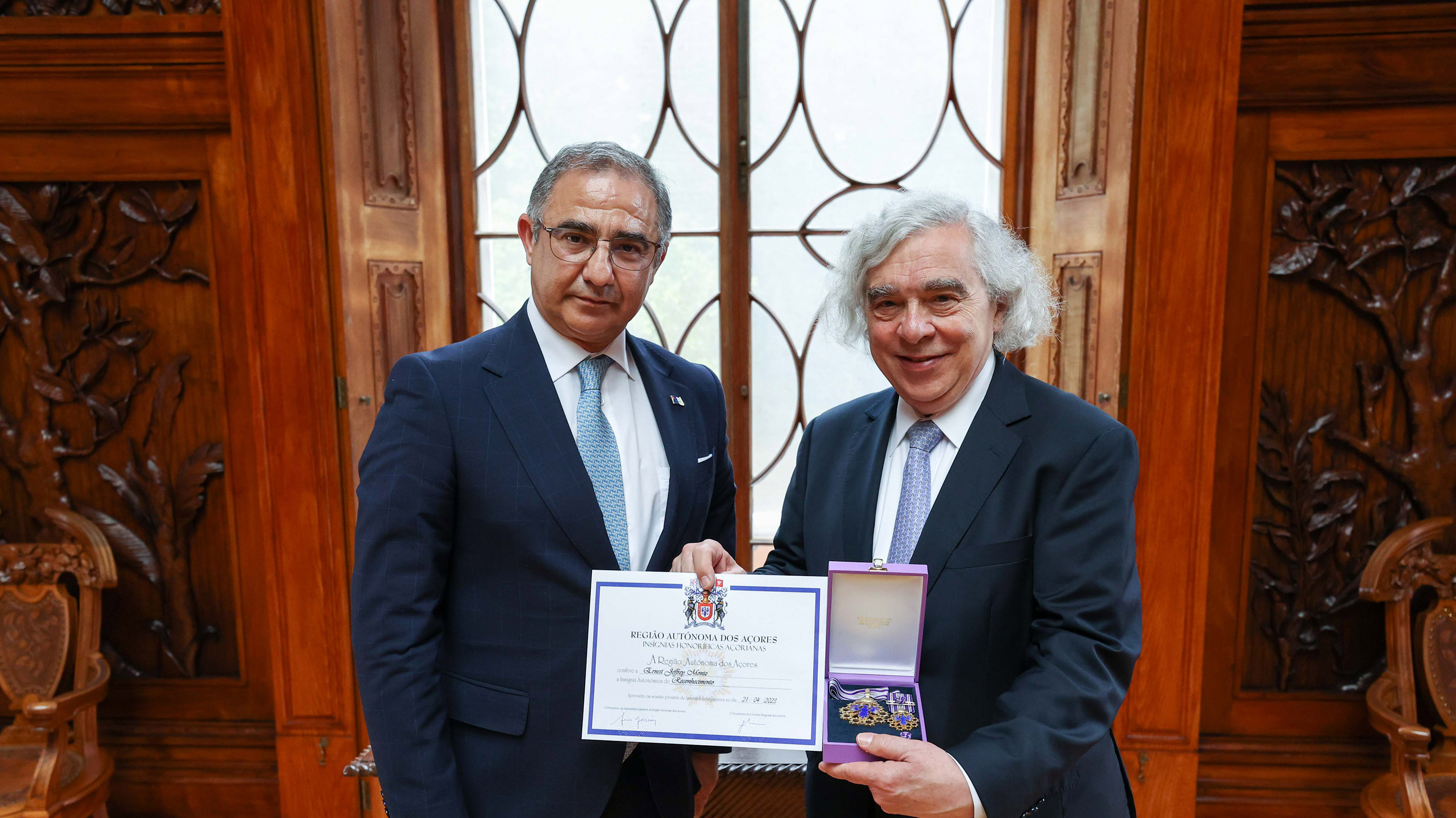
José Manuel Bolieiro, President of the Regional Government of the Azores, awards the Autonomic Commendation of Recognition to Ernest Moniz

- Grand Cross of the Order of Makarios III, Cyprus, 2008
- Grand Cross of the Order of Prince Henry, Portugal, 2015
- Grand Cordon of the Order of the Rising Sun, Japan, 2017
- Doctor Honoris Causa, Universidad Pontificia Comillas de Madrid, Spain, 2013
- Doctor Honoris Causa, University of the Azores, Azores, Portugal, 2023
- Fellow, American Physical Society, USA, 1989
- Fellow, American Academy of Arts and Sciences, USA, 2019
- Member, American Philosophical Society, USA, 2020
- Autonomic Commendation of Recognition from the Regional Government of the Azores, Azores, Portugal, 2023

Political offices
Preceded by Steven Chu	United States Secretary of Energy; 2013–2017	Succeeded by Rick Perry
U.S. order of precedence (ceremonial)
Preceded by Sally Jewell as Former U.S. Cabinet Member	Order of precedence of the United States as Former U.S. Cabinet Member	Succeeded by Penny Pritzker as Former U.S. Cabinet Member
