= Julia Nesheiwat =

American politician

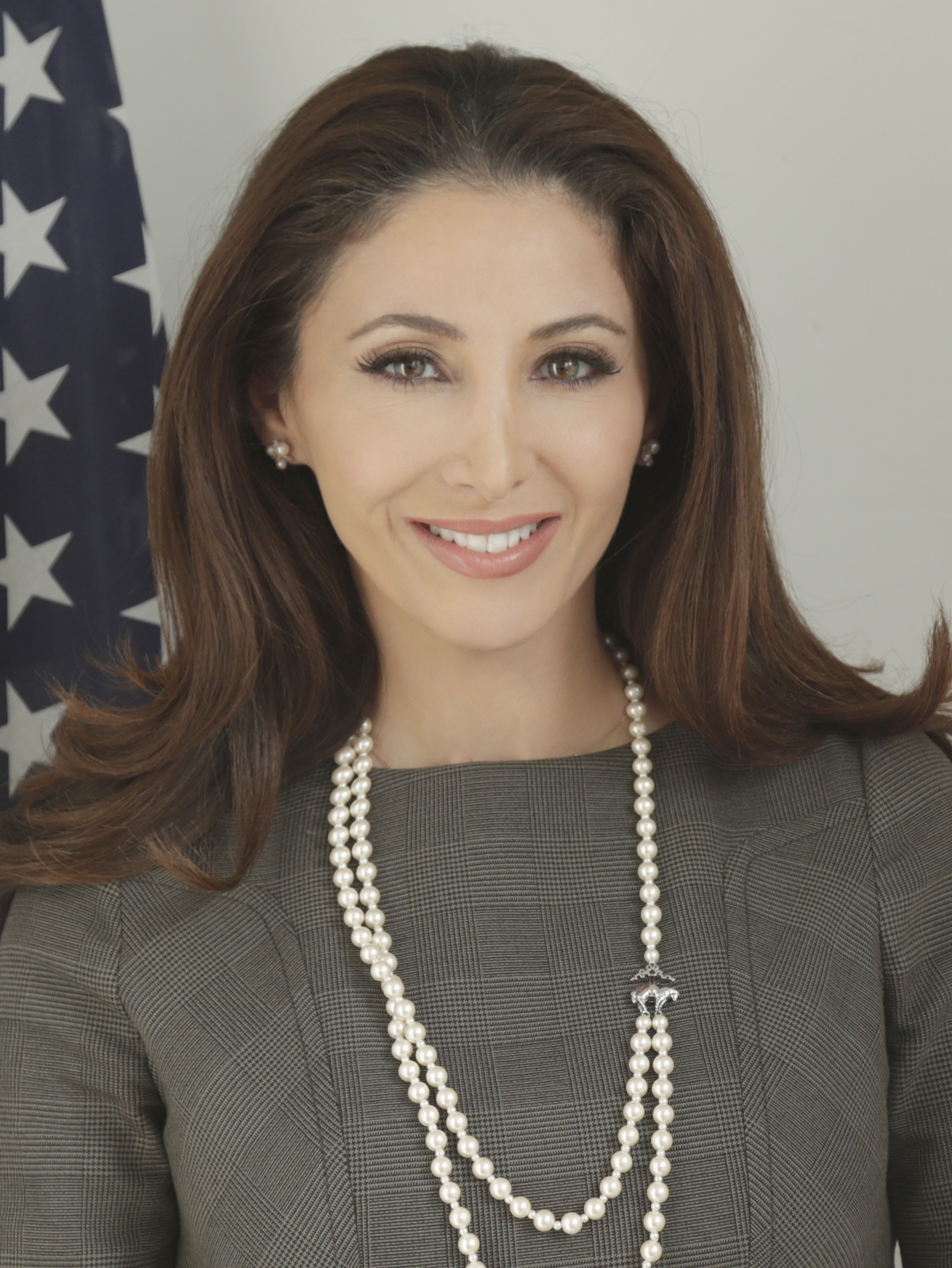
- Nesheiwat in 2019

United States Ambassador-at-Large for Arctic Affairs
- Nominee
- Assumed office TBD
- President: Donald Trump
- Preceded by: Mike Sfraga

10th United States Homeland Security Advisor
- In office February 20, 2020 – January 20, 2021
- President: Donald Trump
- Preceded by: Peter J. Brown
- Succeeded by: Elizabeth Sherwood-Randall

Personal details
- Born: Carmel, New York, U.S.
- Party: Republican
- Spouse: Mike Waltz (m. 2021)
- Children: 1
- Relatives: Janette Nesheiwat (sister); Jaclyn Stapp (sister)
- Education: Stetson University (BA); Georgetown University (MA); Tokyo Institute of Technology (PhD)

Military service
- Allegiance: United States
- Branch: United States Army
- Service years: 1997–2005
- Rank: Captain
- Unit: Military Intelligence Corps
- Conflicts: War in Afghanistan; Iraq War
- Awards: Bronze Star

Julia Nesheiwat is an American academic, business executive, and former government official who served as the 10th homeland security advisor in the first Trump administration from 2020 to 2021. She also held various positions in the Bush and Obama administrations.

Since 2022, Nesheiwat has been the vice president of policy and insights for TC Energy.

== Early life and education ==
The daughter of Jordanian Christian immigrant parents, Nesheiwat is one of five children; she was raised in Umatilla, Florida. Nesheiwat earned a Bachelor of Arts degree from Stetson University, a Master of Arts from Georgetown University, and a PhD from the Tokyo Institute of Technology. She is the sister of Jaclyn Stapp and Janette Nesheiwat.

== Career ==
=== Army service ===
Commissioned in 1997, Nesheiwat served as a U.S. Army military intelligence officer, leaving the Army as a captain. She served consecutive deployments for which she was awarded the Bronze Star Medal in support of Operation Enduring Freedom and Operation Iraqi Freedom. She subsequently served at senior levels on a White House commission, in the Office of the Director of National Intelligence, and in numerous senior economic and national security roles in the State Department spanning the Bush, Obama, and Trump Administrations.

=== Academics ===
After earning her doctorate in science and engineering, Nesheiwat lectured on the geopolitics of energy, climate, and technology in the 21st century at Naval Postgraduate School’s National Security Affairs Department, Stanford University, and at the University of California, San Diego.

=== Government service ===
Nesheiwat was an international affairs fellow with the Council on Foreign Relations and served on the Governing Advisory Council for the World Economic Forum. Nesheiwat also served on the Governing Advisory Council for Clean Energy at the World Economic Forum and was appointed as deputy assistant secretary of state in the Bureau of Energy Resources. She also served as the energy policy advisor in the department’s economic bureau, was the ex officio committee member for the Florida Ocean Alliance, as well as appointed as the Global Ambassador by the World Green Building Council.

Nesheiwat was involved in efforts to keep families informed and win the release of U.S. citizens held hostage on foreign soil, through a new office partnered with Hostage Recovery Fusion Cell which combines resourced from the Defense and State Department, the Central Intelligence Agency, and Treasury Department. Nesheiwat served as the former U.S. Deputy Presidential Envoy for Hostage Affairs from August 2015 to August 2019.

In August 2019, Florida Governor Ron DeSantis had appointed Nesheiwat as the state's first chief resilience officer. Florida is only the third state (joining Rhode Island and Oregon) to have "designated resilience offices with clear executives that report directly to the governor." In this role, she was tasked with preparing Florida for the “environmental, physical and economic impacts” of sea level rise, confirmed by a 2014 national climate assessment. Nesheiwat has supported the scientific consensus on climate change and its impact on the state of Florida. Nesheiwat is serving as a distinguished fellow at the Atlantic Council also focused on energy, climate, arctic policy, and national security and was appointed as US Commissioner on the US Arctic Research Commission.

==== Homeland security advisor ====
On February 20, 2020, Politico reported that President Donald Trump would select Nesheiwat to be his new homeland security advisor, according to an administration official and another person familiar with the matter." Robert C. O'Brien later confirmed Nesheiwat's appointment, praising her as a person who has "extensive national security experience, which will be invaluable for this important role."

==== U.S. Ambassador-at-Large nomination ====
In August 2026, President Trump nominated Nesheiwat to serve as the United States Ambassador-at-Large for Arctic Affairs in his second administration.

== Personal life ==
Nesheiwat is married to Mike Waltz, who was the U.S. national security advisor under President Trump from January to May 2025 and has served as U.S. Ambassador to the United Nations since September 2025. Waltz and Nesheiwat have a son together. They live in St. Johns County, Florida.

Political offices
Preceded by Peter J. Brown	United States Homeland Security Advisor; 2020–2021	Succeeded by Elizabeth Sherwood-Randall
