= Peter J. Brown =

American Coast Guard rear admiral (born 1963)

Peter Brown
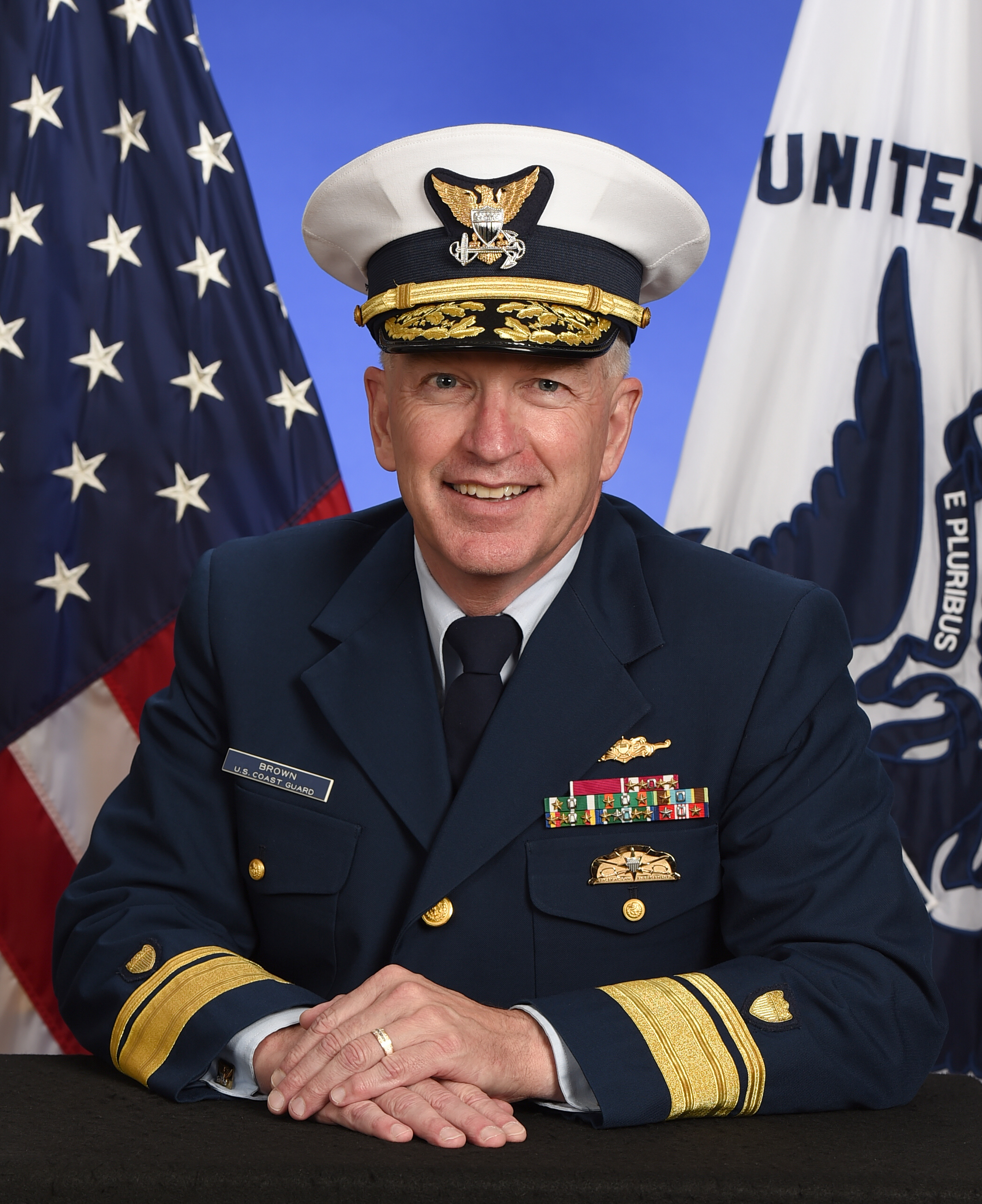
- Brown in 2016

Special Representative for Puerto Rico
- In office February 7, 2020 – January 20, 2021
- President: Donald Trump
- Preceded by: Position established
- Succeeded by: Position abolished

9th Homeland Security Advisor
- In office July 12, 2019 – February 7, 2020
- President: Donald Trump
- Preceded by: Doug Fears
- Succeeded by: Julia Nesheiwat

Personal details
- Born: Peter James Rogan; October 28, 1963 (age 62) New York City, New York, U.S.
- Education: United States Coast Guard Academy (BS); University of Miami (MS); University of Connecticut (JD)

Military service
- Allegiance: United States
- Branch: U.S. Coast Guard
- Service years: 1985–2021
- Rank: Rear Admiral

Peter James Brown (born Peter James Rogan; October 28, 1963) is a retired United States Coast Guard rear admiral, who served as the Special Representative for Puerto Rico's Disaster Recovery. He previously served as the ninth Homeland Security Advisor in the first Trump Administration.

== Early life and education ==
Brown was born in New York City and raised in Somers, New York. He earned a Bachelor of Science degree in chemistry from the United States Coast Guard Academy in May 1985, followed by a Master of Science in Chemistry from the University of Miami in May 1991 and a Juris Doctor from the University of Connecticut School of Law in May 1995.

== Career ==
Prior to serving in the United States Department of Homeland Security, Brown was a commander of the Coast Guard's Seventh District in Miami.

In September 2019, Brown was active in advising President Trump during Hurricane Dorian, accompanying him to Camp David to provide status updates during the storm. During the Hurricane Dorian–Alabama controversy, Brown defended Trump in several statements, stating that he had briefed the president on models in which Dorian would make landfall in Alabama.

On February 7, 2020, it was announced that Brown would become Trump's Special Representative for Puerto Rico's Disaster Recovery, coordinating Puerto Rico’s continuing recovery efforts from Hurricane Maria and the recent 2020 Puerto Rico earthquakes.

Political offices
Preceded by Tom Bossert	United States Homeland Security Advisor; 2019–2020	Succeeded by Julia Nesheiwat
