= Poneman =

Poneman is a surname. Notable people with the surname include:

- Daniel Poneman (born 1956), American government official
- Jonathan Poneman (born 1959), American record executive
