= Meaghan Jarensky =

American model

Meaghan Jarensky Barakett
- Born: Meaghan Jarensky; October 31, 1978 (age 47); New Jersey, United States
- Other name: Meaghan
- Height: 5 ft 9 in (1.75 m)
- Spouse: Brett Barakett
- Website: http://www.onegirlny.org

Meaghan Jarensky Barakett is an American model, yoga practitioner, humanist, and advocate of young women. Jarensky is a former Miss New York USA and represented the state in the 2005 Miss USA Pageant, the last time New York placed in the top 10 finalists. She is also a former Mrs. New York America and represented the state in the 2010 Mrs. America Pageant. Jarensky is the founder and President of One Girl Inc, a 501c3 non-profit dedicated to providing leadership training to young women to help them effectively serve their communities.

== Pageants ==
Jarensky won the Miss New York USA 2005 title. It was her first attempt at the title, and she was crowned by outgoing titleholder Jaclyn Nesheiwat Stapp. Her sister titleholder was Natascha Bessez, Miss New York Teen USA 2005.

Jarensky represented New York in the Miss USA 2005 Pageant held in Baltimore, Maryland in April, 2005. She placed in the top ten of the nationally televised pageant, which was the first placement by a delegate from New York since 2002. Jarensky's silver Grecian-inspired evening gown by fashion designer Marc Bouwer was given a lot of attention during the pageant, because of its styling, which was highly unusual for a gown worn in a pageant. During the Top 10 swimsuit competition, Jarensky almost tripped on the sarong worn by Miss California USA Brittany Hogan who threw it on the ground while she competed in the swimsuit competition. Prior to the pageant, Jarensky appeared on a special Miss USA episode of Fear Factor with five other Miss USA 2005 delegates.

On July 10, 2010, Jarensky won the Mrs. New York America 2010 pageant under her then married name, Meaghan Castaldi. She competed in the Mrs. America 2010 pageant, which was held in September 2010 in Tucson, Arizona. She won the Whimsical Costume award.

== Education ==
Jarensky is a graduate of Absegami High School, has earned a BA in international marketing from Pace University, holds a certificate from the Institute of Integrative Nutrition, is certified by the American Association of Drugless Practitioners as a Holistic Health Counselor, holds multiple certifications in yoga and meditation, and recently completed a master's degree in Non-Profit Leadership at Fordham University.

== Legislation ==
In December 2014 Jarensky was impersonated on match.com, and subpoenaed the website for the perpetrator's identity. She used this experience to draft a bill along with New York State Senator Kevin Parker, calling for passage of New York State Senate Bill S5871-A, the E-ImPersonation Prevention Act. This would create an anti-cyberbullying law which would criminalize online impersonation with the intent to harm.

Preceded by Jaclyn Nesheiwat	Miss New York USA; 2005	Succeeded by Adriana Diaz
