= Doug Fears =

United States Coast Guard rear admiral

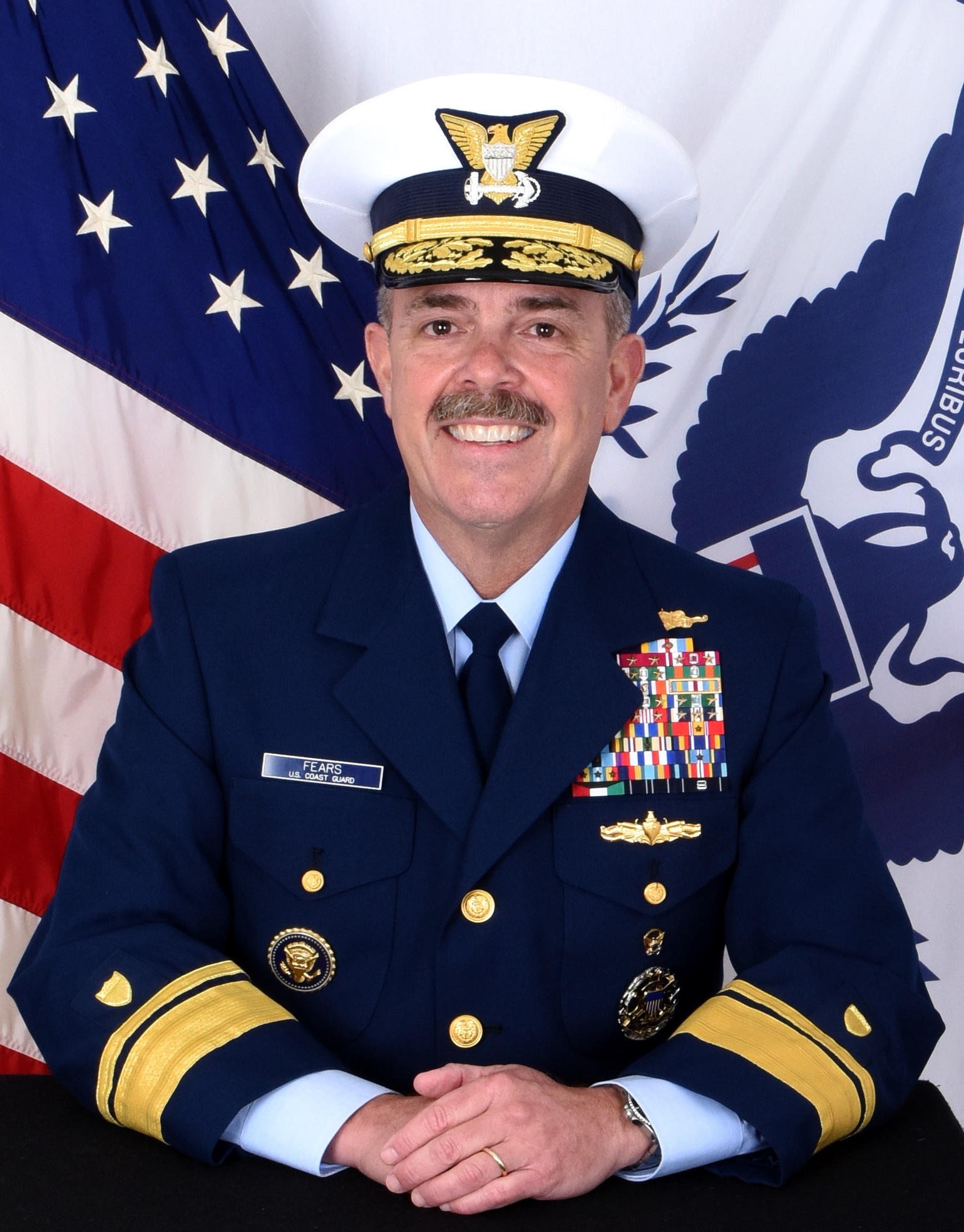

8th United States Homeland Security Advisor
- In office June 1, 2018 – July 12, 2019
- President: Donald Trump
- Preceded by: Rob Joyce (Acting)
- Succeeded by: Peter Brown

Personal details
- Born: Douglas Margrave Fears Maryland, U.S.
- Education: United States Coast Guard Academy (BS); Naval War College (MA); Harvard University (MPA)

Military service
- Allegiance: United States
- Branch/service: United States Coast Guard
- Years of service: 1982–2022
- Rank: Rear Admiral
- Commands: USCGC Hamilton; USCGC Diligence

Douglas Margrave Fears is a retired United States Coast Guard rear admiral who last served as Director of Joint Interagency Task Force South. He previously served as Assistant Commandant for Response Policy. Fears was the Homeland Security Advisor to President Donald Trump until July 12, 2019.

== Early life and education ==
Fears was born in Maryland and enlisted in the United States Coast Guard in 1982, receiving an appointment to the United States Coast Guard Academy in 1985. He was commissioned as an ensign in 1989 after earning a Bachelor of Science in government from the Coast Guard Academy. He later received a master of arts in national security and strategic studies from the Naval War College and a master of public administration from the Kennedy School of Government at Harvard University.

== Career ==
Fears has been the captain of three vessels, including the USCGC Diligence and the USCGC Hamilton, a National Security cutter, and has served on five others. He has also been in charge of the Coast Guard's Office of Law Enforcement, has been a program reviewer in the Coast Guard headquarters, has been a liaison to the U.S. House of Representatives, and has served as chief of staff to the commander of the Coast Guard Atlantic Area Command. He currently holds the rank of rear admiral (lower half) in the Coast Guard.

Additionally, Fears was a Coast Guard Fellow at the Center for Strategic and International Studies from 2009 to 2010 and a fellow at the Massachusetts Institute of Technology Seminar XXI on Foreign Politics, International Relations, and the National Interest.

In addition to his Coast Guard career, Fears has served in the administration of President Donald Trump as a special assistant to the President, as director for Central America and the Caribbean on the National Security Council staff, as senior director for resilience policy for the National Security Council, and as Homeland Security Advisor.

Political offices
Preceded by Rob Joyce; Acting	United States Homeland Security Advisor; 2018–2019	Succeeded by Peter Brown
