= Janette Nesheiwat =

American physician (born 1976)

Personal details
- Born: August 25, 1976 (age 50) Carmel, New York, U.S.
- Relatives: Julia Nesheiwat (sister); Jaclyn Stapp (sister); Mike Waltz (brother-in-law)
- Education: Stetson University (attended); University of South Florida (BS); American University of the Caribbean (MD)

Janette Nesheiwat (born August 25, 1976) is an American physician who was educated at a Caribbean medical school and completed her residency in Arkansas. She was briefly nominated for Surgeon General of the United States during the second Trump administration. Nesheiwat has served as the medical director of the healthcare company CityMD and is a medical contributor on Fox News.

== Early life and education ==
Janette Nesheiwat was born in Carmel, New York, the daughter of Jordanian Christian immigrants. She is one of five children; her siblings are Julia Nesheiwat, Jaclyn Stapp, Dina Nesheiwat, and Daniel Nesheiwat. Julia Nesheiwat is married to Mike Waltz, a Republican former congressperson and former national security advisor to Donald Trump who has served as U.S. ambassador to the United Nations since 2025. In 1982, Nesheiwat's family relocated from New York to Umatilla, Florida.

In 1990, when she was thirteen years old, Nesheiwat accidentally knocked over a fishing tackle box and a handgun inside that had fallen with the tackle box discharged, causing one bullet to fire which killed her father Ziad Nesheiwat in what police described as a "freak accident." Janette Nesheiwat and her four siblings were then raised by her mother Hayat Nesheiwat, a pediatric nurse. Nesheiwat says her father's death and her mother motivated her to become a physician.

She later attended Umatilla High School, received a Bachelor of Science in Biology from University of South Florida in 2000, and completed coursework at Stetson University. After completing the Army Reserve Officers' Training Corps (ROTC) program, Nesheiwat was medically disenrolled. From August 2000 to April 2006, she attended the American University of the Caribbean School of Medicine in St. Maarten where she received her medical degree. She did her residency program in family medicine at the University of Arkansas for Medical Sciences from 2006 to 2009.

== Career ==
Nesheiwat is a board-certified family medicine physician. Her early career included practicing in Northwest Arkansas, where she was also the host of Jones TV's Family Health Today. In 2012, she was awarded the Red Cross community partner hero award. In 2013, Nesheiwat was selected by Arkansas Business for the publication's annual "40 under 40" list, which profiled forty leaders in the state of Arkansas under the age of forty. She was noted for her medical practice, local television reporting, and international relief efforts in Morocco, Haiti, and Poland, as well as relief efforts after Hurricane Katrina and the Joplin tornadoes.

In 2012, Nesheiwat moved to New York City, New York, where she worked for CityMD, an urgent care provider. She eventually became one of CityMD's directors. In addition, she continued working as a medical news correspondent, frequently contributing to national television networks to discuss health-related topics such as genetic testing research, surgical procedures, the health risks of vaping, and the opioid epidemic. In March 2020, she was hired by Fox News Channel as a medical contributor to provide analysis and commentary about the COVID-19 pandemic first-hand.

Nesheiwat wrote a memoir, Beyond the Stethoscope: Miracles in Medicine, which was released in December 2024. She has also founded a brand of dietary supplements, BC Boost.

Nesheiwat was briefly a nominee for Surgeon General of the United States during the second Trump administration. Additionally, far-right activist Laura Loomer claimed Nesheiwat was "not ideologically aligned" with Trump. Hours later, Trump announced that he would instead nominate Casey Means as surgeon general.
