= United States Homeland Security Advisor =

Senior aide in the U.S. National Security Council

Assistant to the President for Homeland Security
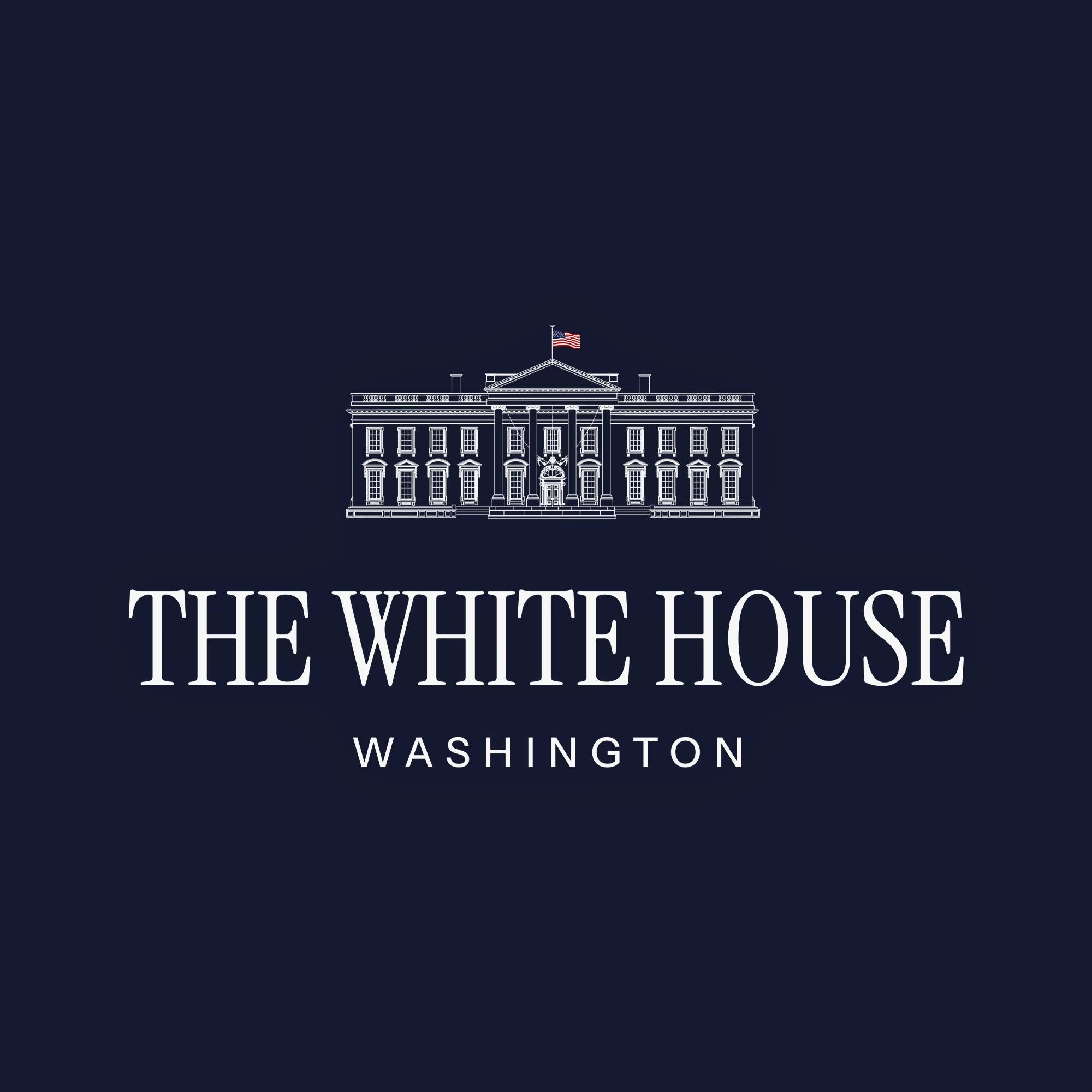

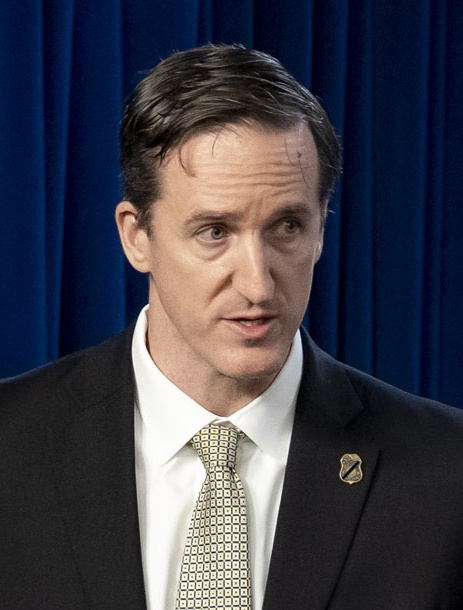
- Incumbent; Anthony Salisbury since November 12, 2026
- Executive Office of the President; Homeland Security Council
- Member of: National Security Council; Homeland Security Council
- Reports to: President of the United States; White House Chief of Staff; United States National Security Advisor
- Appointer: President of the United States
- Constituting instrument: Homeland Security Act 2002
- Formation: 2001
- First holder: Tom Ridge
- Deputy: Anthony Salisbury

The assistant to the president for homeland security, commonly referred to as the homeland security advisor, is a senior aide in the National Security Council, based in the West Wing of the White House, who serves as principal advisor to the president of the United States on homeland security and counterterrorism issues.

The homeland security advisor is also a statutory member of the United States Homeland Security Council. Serving at the pleasure of the president, the homeland security advisor does not require Senate confirmation for appointment to the office.

== History ==
In the immediate aftermath of the September 11 attacks, President George W. Bush announced the creation of the interim Office of Homeland Security as a cabinet-level office in a speech to a joint session of Congress. He appointed Tom Ridge as its first director. The Homeland Security Council was formally created on October 5, 2001, replacing the Office of Homeland Security.

Under the George W. Bush administration, the homeland security advisor was independent of the National Security Council, residing within the Homeland Security Council. Under the Obama administration, while the Homeland Security Council remained, the Advisor held the title of Deputy National Security Advisor for Homeland Security and Counterterrorism, subordinating the position to the national security advisor.

At the start of the Trump administration, the position of Homeland Security Advisor, occupied by Tom Bossert, was elevated to the rank of Assistant to the President, making it equal in rank to the National Security Advisor. However, after clashes with the National Security Advisor, John Bolton, the position returned to the rank of Deputy Assistant to the President and was subordinate to the National Security Advisor.

And most recently under the Biden administration, the Homeland Security Council remained. The homeland security advisor (Elizabeth Sherwood-Randall) concurrently held the title and served as the Deputy National Security Advisor for Homeland Security and Counterterrorism, subordinating the position to the National Security Advisor.

== List of homeland security advisors ==
Democratic Republican Independent

Denotes acting capacity.

No.	Image	Name	Start	End	Duration	President
1		Tom Ridge	October 8, 2001	January 24, 2003	1 year, 126 days	George W. Bush (2001–2009)
2		John Gordon	April 30, 2003	July 28, 2004	1 year, 89 days	George W. Bush (2001–2009)
3		Fran Townsend	July 28, 2004	March 30, 2008	3 years, 246 days	George W. Bush (2001–2009)
4		Ken Wainstein	March 30, 2008	January 20, 2009	296 days	George W. Bush (2001–2009)
5		John Brennan	January 20, 2009	January 25, 2013	4 years, 5 days	Barack Obama (2009–2017)
6		Lisa Monaco	January 25, 2013	January 20, 2017	3 years, 361 days	Barack Obama (2009–2017)
7		Tom Bossert	January 20, 2017	April 10, 2018	1 year, 49 days	Donald Trump (2017–2021)
–		Rob Joyce; Acting	April 10, 2018	May 31, 2018	51 days	Donald Trump (2017–2021)
8		Doug Fears	June 1, 2018	July 12, 2019	1 year, 41 days	Donald Trump (2017–2021)
9		Peter Brown	July 12, 2019	February 7, 2020	210 days	Donald Trump (2017–2021)
10		Julia Nesheiwat	February 20, 2020	January 20, 2021	334 days	Donald Trump (2017–2021)
11		Liz Sherwood-Randall	January 20, 2021	January 20, 2025	4 years, 0 days	Joe Biden (2021–2025)
12		Stephen Miller	January 20, 2025	November 9, 2026	1 year, 293 days	Donald Trump (2025–present)
13		Anthony Salisbury	November 12, 2026	Incumbent	2 days	Donald Trump (2025–present)

=== Titles ===
- Assistant to the President for Homeland Security (September 20, 2001 – July 28, 2004)
- Assistant to the President for Homeland Security and Counterterrorism (July 28, 2004 – January 20, 2009)
- Deputy National Security Advisor for Homeland Security and Counterterrorism (January 20, 2009 – January 20, 2017)
- Assistant to the President for Homeland Security and Counterterrorism (January 20, 2017 – May 31, 2018)
- Deputy Assistant to the President for Homeland Security and Counterterrorism (June 1, 2018 – January 20, 2021)
- Assistant to the President and Homeland Security Advisor and Deputy National Security Advisor (January 20, 2021 – January 20, 2025)
- Assistant to the President and Homeland Security Advisor (January 20, 2025 – present)

== See also ==
- Executive Office of the President
