= Al Hofmann =

American racing driver (1947–2008)

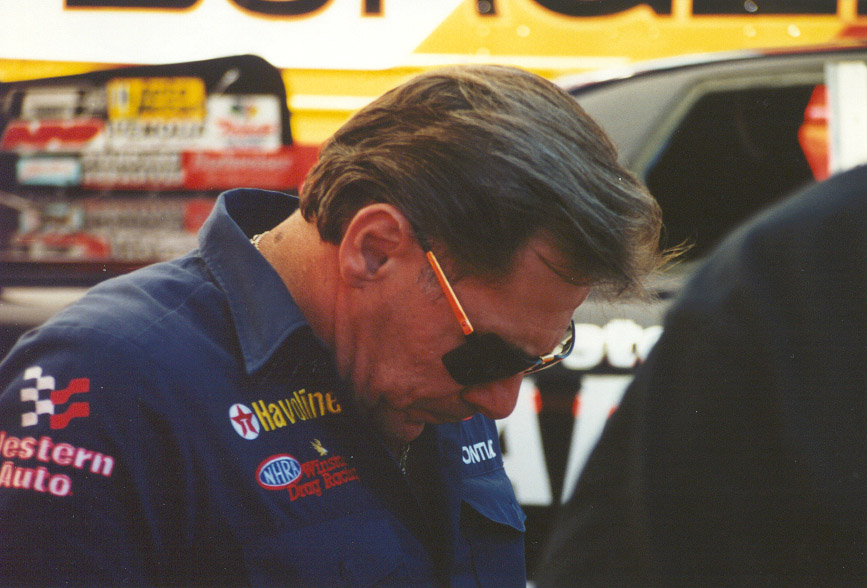
- Nationality: American
- Born: November 28, 1947
- Died: March 20, 2008 (aged 60)

National Hot Rod Association Funny Car
- Years active: 1968–2002
- Wins: 15
- Best finish: 2nd in 1995

Al Hofmann (November 28, 1947 – March 20, 2008) was an American dragracer and drag car owner in the funny car division from Umatilla, Florida. He raced in the National Hot Rod Association. He was the second of only two funny cars to join the 300 MPH club 301.10 (Feb 19, 1994) and the thirteenth overall. Hofmann was also the third member of the four second funny car club 4.992 (May 19, 1995 ).

Hofmann competed in thirty-two final rounds, winning fifteen races. These 15 wins placed him seventh on the all-time Funny Car wins list as of 2002. Hofmann finished in the top-ten season points standings during seven seasons, including every year from 1991 until 1996.

== Racing career ==
Hofmann grew up on the East Coast of the United States. He began drag racing in 1968 with a 1955 Chevrolet. After doing some street racing, he realized it was too dangerous and started drag racing at a track. He won the first event that he entered in the C/Gas category. His Chevy was nicknamed "Hang 'Em High" because his wheelstands scraped the car's bumper. His next car was a big block 1957 Chevy nicknamed "Rat Poison". He drove a series of doorslammers and appeared to be a Pro Stock driver, but then he decided to start racing the faster funny cars.

Hofmann sold his construction company in 1978 to buy the Radici & Wise funny car operation. He initially did not have enough experience with funny cars to start the car. He had to get a friend with alcohol experience to start the car. He went across the United States for three months with Sid Waterman at California to learn about the car. Hofmann said, "He wanted me to be a hands-on racer, not just a driver. So he had me take the engine apart and put it together about ten times. He felt it would help my driving if I had a better mechanical understanding of the car."

Hofmann started drag racing on the East Coast of the United States. He went to Australia twice for a three-month visit. "Those trips were a good thing for me," said Hofmann. "Not only did I win a couple of championships, but I got the chance to meet the people from Blower Drive Service from Whittier, California. They thought I had some potential and backed it up with $100,000 in sponsorship funding." Hofmann added, "That allowed me to hire Tom Anderson as a crew chief, one of the best moves I ever made. It was impossible for me to do both the driving and tuning by myself, and Tom had a lot more experience anyway. We ended up winning a lot of races together."

Hofmann won his first national events in 1991, when he won at the Winston Invitational then Dallas and Ponoma's second event. He finished in the Top 10 in season points. He followed up with three wins in 1992 when he finished third in the season points. Hofmann's 1993 season ended with a fourth-place points finish.

Hofmann acquired major sponsorship backing for the 1994 season from Western Auto. Along with wife Helen, Tom Anderson and crew Jimbo Ermolovich, Brian MacDermott, Rob Hyson, Larry Liu, Janet Rantala, Jim Leclair. That year the team finished third in the Funny car points, behind Chuck Etchells and John Force and winning only at Houston.

Hofmann's highest season points finish was second in 1995 when he won five races. Houston, Columbus, Sonoma, Seattle, and Pomona, and runner up finishes at Pomona, Memphis, Topeka and Denver. He also chalked up wins at the Budweiser Shootout 1992-94-95. Hofmann developed a fierce rivalry with John Force. Hofmann described their rivalry as "That was a fun time. We played it up for all it was worth." He followed the season by finishing fourth in the season points for 1996. Anderson left the team in July 1996 and Western Auto's sponsorship of the team ended that year.

Hofmann started out the 1997 season by winning the Gatornationals, but a fiery crash in the shutdown area after the win led to Hofmann breaking an arm. He missed four races in the middle of the season. His comeback peaked eight months later with a win at the Revell Nationals in Dallas that October. He finished thirteenth in points that season despite missing the four events. He raced in the GM Performance Parts dragster through the rest of the decade.

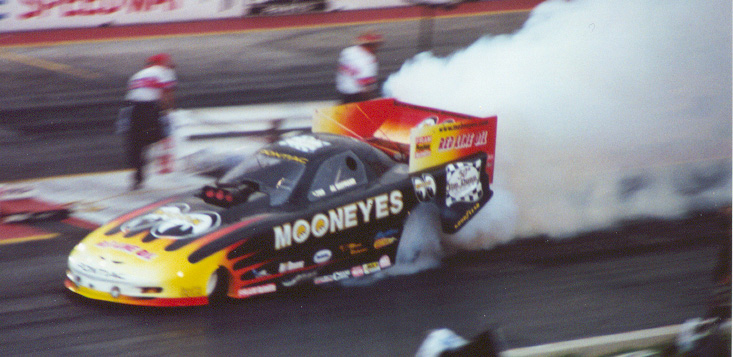
Al Hofmann Mooneyes funny car, owned by Jim Dunn, from 2001 or 2002

In 2000, Hofmann started driving for Jim Dunn. He left the team after the 2002 Gainesville race and he never raced again.

== Retirement and death ==
After his retirement, Hofmann started an automobile and street rod restoration business. In 2007, Hofmann said, "I sold the business last year and am effectively retired at this point. I bought a motorhome and took a trip all over the country with my wife, Susie, who is Johnny West's sister and a former worker on the NHRA Safety Safari team. We're just two old racers, riding around together and having a good time."

Hofmann died March 20, 2008, of a heart attack at his RV park in Eustis, Florida.

== Son's Tribute ==
Wayne Hofmann has used his father's liveries and bodies actively in Nostalgia Funny Car events with the Funny Car Chaos tour with authentic or replica bodies. Wayne has raced the 1979 "China Syndrome" Dodge Omni, the 1995 Sears-sponsored Pontiac Firebird, and announced on December 23, 2024 on Facebook he has restored the 1991 Ford Probe body from the Blower Drive Service Funny Car that Al campaigned that year in Funny Car, which he will use in 2025 on Funny Car Chaos.
