= Tom Bossert =

American presidential advisor (born 1975)

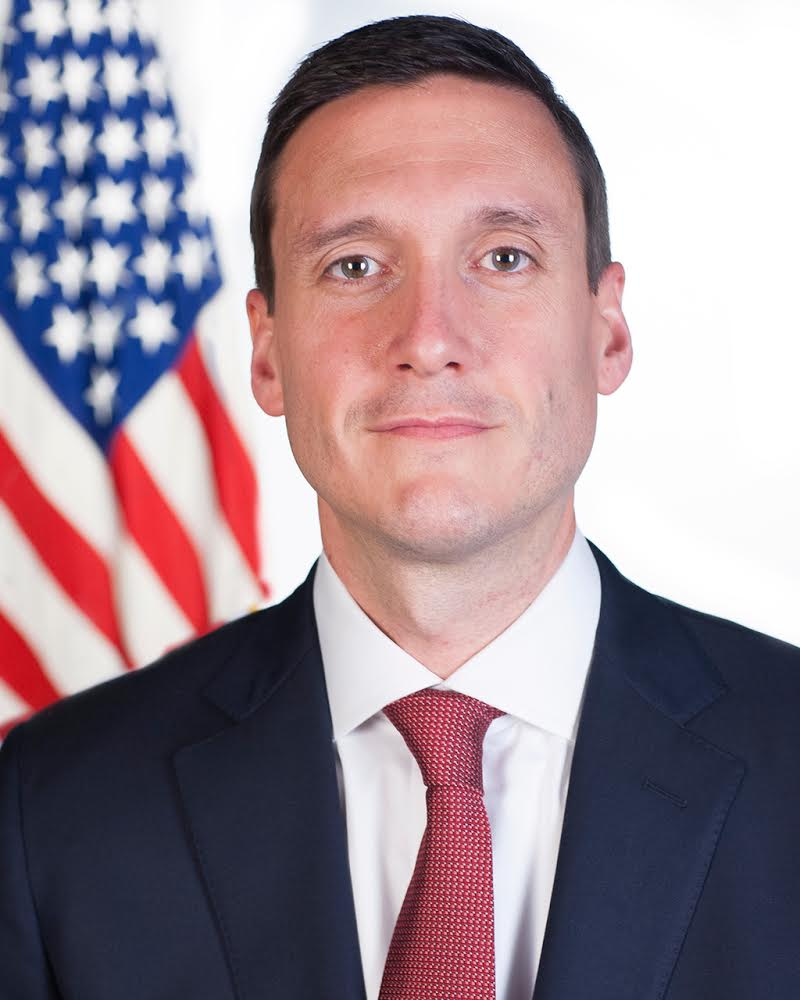

7th United States Homeland Security Advisor
- In office January 20, 2017 – April 10, 2018
- President: Donald Trump
- Preceded by: Lisa Monaco
- Succeeded by: Rob Joyce (Acting)

Personal details
- Born: March 25, 1975 (age 50); Quakertown, Pennsylvania, U.S.
- Political party: Republican
- Education: University of Pittsburgh (BA); George Washington University (JD)

Thomas P. Bossert (born March 25, 1975) is an American lawyer and former Homeland Security Advisor to U.S. President Donald Trump. He is an ABC News Homeland Security analyst.

Immediately before, he was a fellow at the Atlantic Council and prior to that he served as Deputy Homeland Security Advisor to President George W. Bush. In that capacity, he co-authored the 2007 National Strategy for Homeland Security. Prior to that, Bossert held positions in the Federal Emergency Management Agency, the Small Business Administration, the Office of the Independent Counsel, and the House of Representatives. He also was appointed as the Director of Infrastructure Protection under Bush, overseeing the security of critical U.S. infrastructure, a post he held for two years.

Bossert was appointed the Senior Director for Preparedness Policy within the Executive Office of the President.

== Early life ==
Bossert was born and raised in Quakertown, Pennsylvania, where he graduated from Quakertown Community High School in 1993. He attended the University of Pittsburgh, where he earned a Bachelor of Arts in Political Science and Economics in 1997, and attended George Washington University Law School, earning his Juris Doctor in 2003.

== Political career ==
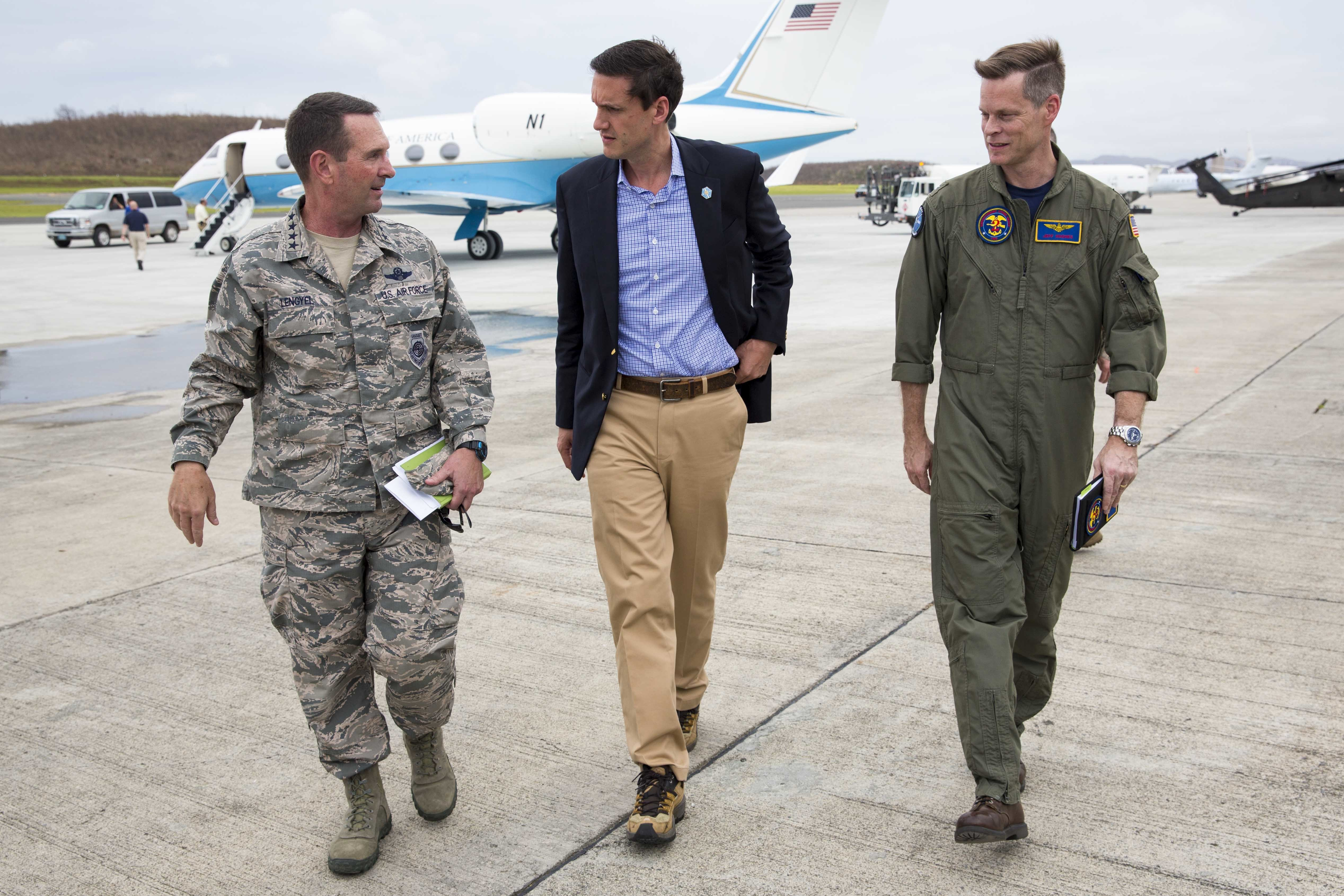
Bossert with Gen. Joseph Lengyel (left) and Rear Adm. Jeff Hughes (right) in 2017

Following the end of the Bush administration, Bossert was made a Nonresident Zurich Cyber Risk Fellow at the Atlantic Council's Cyber Security Initiative, a position he held until 2016. He also became president of the risk management consulting firm Civil Defense Solutions.

On December 27, 2016, the Trump transition team announced that then President-elect Donald Trump intended to appoint Bossert to the post of Homeland Security Advisor (officially titled the Assistant to the President for Homeland Security and Counterterrorism), a position that would not require Senate confirmation. Bossert was officially appointed on January 20, 2017, the date of President Trump's entrance into office.

On July 20, 2017, Bossert called for a comprehensive bio-defense strategy against devastating pandemics and intentional attacks, and commented that retired Admiral Tim Ziemer was contributing to the development of the strategy.

On July 27, 2017, British email prankster James Linton, spear-phished Bossert into thinking he was Jared Kushner by sending an email to Bossert; he received Bossert's private email address without asking for it.

Bossert resigned on April 8, 2018, the day after John Bolton, the newly-appointed National Security Advisor, started his tenure. Bossert's departure corresponded with the dissolution of the global health security team that he oversaw.

On December 16, 2020, The New York Times published an opinion piece by Bossert warning that U.S. networks had been seriously compromised by Russia and had been for months.

== See also ==
- Trump–Ukraine scandal

Political offices
Preceded by Lisa Monaco	United States Homeland Security Advisor; 2017–2018	Succeeded by Rob Joyce; Acting
