= Howard Van Hyning =

American musician

Howard Martin Van Hyning (January 9, 1936 – October 30, 2010) was an American percussionist who was best known for his work with the New York City Opera. He built a collection of more than 1,000 percussion instruments that he would make available to orchestras for performances and which included an array of gongs that were specifically constructed for use in performances of Turandot by Giacomo Puccini. Van Hyning taught at Mannes College The New School for Music.

== Biography ==
Van Hyning was born in Umatilla, Florida. He earned his undergraduate degree and a master's from the Juilliard School, which he attended on a scholarship, studying percussion under the instruction of Morris Goldenberg and Saul Goodman. He spent two years with the Baltimore Symphony Orchestra.

Having been hired by the New York City Opera in 1966, he became the orchestra's principal percussionist, serving for 40 years before he was forced to retire from the company in 2006 due to Parkinson's disease. During his career he amassed a collection of rare and unusual percussion instruments, including a unique set of 13 gongs constructed by the Tronci family specifically for Puccini.

Van Hyning had been searching for a proper set of gongs and obtained the original set from the Stivanello Costume Company, which had acquired the gongs as the result of winning a bet. In 1987 he bought the gongs for his collection, paying thousands of dollars for the set, which he described as having "colorful, intense, centered and perfumed" sound qualities. He founded Van Percussion as a company that would rent out his rare and unusual instruments to orchestras around the world.

== Death ==
A resident of Hastings-on-Hudson, New York, Van Hyning died at the age of 74 on October 30, 2010, at his home there due to a heart attack. He was survived by his wife, Marlene Piturro, as well as by a daughter and a son.
