= Rob Joyce =

American cybersecurity official

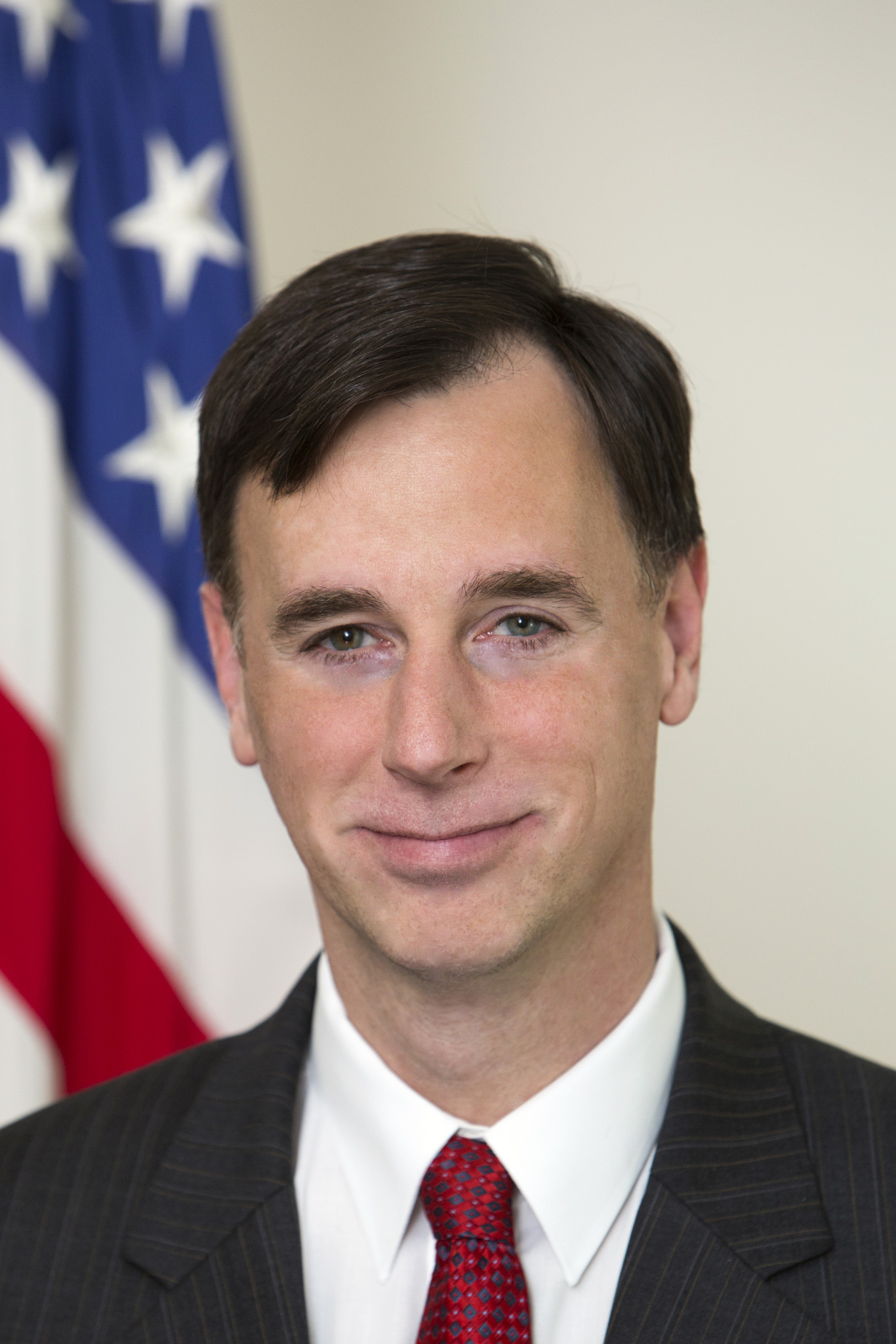

Acting United States Homeland Security Advisor
- In office April 10, 2018 – May 31, 2018
- President: Donald Trump
- Preceded by: Tom Bossert
- Succeeded by: Doug Fears

Personal details
- Education: Clarkson University (BS); Johns Hopkins University (MS)

Robert E. Joyce is an American cybersecurity official who served as special assistant to the President and Cybersecurity Coordinator on the U.S. National Security Council. He also began serving as White House Homeland Security Adviser to President Donald Trump on an acting basis after the resignation of Tom Bossert from April 10, 2018, to May 31, 2018. He completed his detail to the White House in May 2018 and returned to the National Security Agency, where he served as the Senior Advisor to the Director NSA for Cyber Security Strategy, until July 2019 when he went to London and served in the US Embassy as the NSA's senior cryptologic representative to the UK. Joyce previously performed as acting Deputy Homeland Security Advisor since October 13, 2017. On January 15, 2021, the NSA announced that Joyce would replace Anne Neuberger as its Director of Cybersecurity.

Joyce announced his retirement in February 2024 after 34 years with the agency. His departure was in late March 2024, where he was succeeded by David Luber as the Director of Cybersecurity. After leaving NSA, Joyce established Joyce Cyber LLC in 2024 providing cybersecurity consulting services. on May 18, 2024, OpenAI announced he was part of their Safety and Security Committee. Other consulting clients include Microsoft, PwC, Beacon Global Strategies, Sandfly Security and he routinely speaks professionally through Leading Authorities Speaker's Bureau.

== Education ==
Joyce graduated from Clarkson University in 1989 with a Bachelor of Science in Electrical and Computer Engineering and received a Master of Science in Electrical Engineering from Johns Hopkins University in 1993.

== Career ==
At the White House, Joyce was instrumental in the crafting of a cybersecurity executive order, EO13800 Strengthening the Cybersecurity of Federal Networks and Critical Infrastructure and revamping the nation's Vulnerabilities Equities Process (VEP). In his current position he continues to speak publicly about nation state cybersecurity threats, including a 2018 DEF CON keynote. and appearing on 60 Minutes. Joyce previously worked in the National Security Agency (NSA), beginning in 1989, in a variety of roles. From 2013 to 2017, he was head of the NSA's Tailored Access Operations (TAO), a cyber-warfare intelligence-gathering unit. In that role, he gave a rare public talk at the USENIX Enigma Cybersecurity conference about disrupting nation state hackers. Previously, he served as the deputy director of the now-defunct Information Assurance Directorate (IAD) or Directorate I, and the SID Associate Deputy Director for Counterterrorism. Also within the NSA, Joyce worked as Technical Director for the NSA Commercial Solution Center's Commercial Partnerships Office, and was chief of the Selection Systems Branch and Technical Director in NSA's Special Source Operations.

After John R. Bolton pushed out Tom Bossert as the Homeland Security advisor, Joyce announced he had completed this twelve-month detail to the White House and gave 30 days notice that he was returning to NSA because of the difficulties in getting priority attention for cyber policy in the administration. Bolton subsequently eliminated the White House Cybersecurity Advisor position.

== Personal life ==
Joyce notes in his biography that he runs an annual Christmas Light show "likely visible from the International Space Station" and gave a talk titled "Building Absurd Christmas Light Shows" at the 2018 Shmoocon cybersecurity conference. Additionally he led a Boy Scout team to the annual World Championship of Pumpkin Chucking, building a contraption to fling pumpkins for distance.

Political offices
Preceded by Tom Bossert	United States Homeland Security Advisor; Acting; 2018	Succeeded by Doug Fears
