= Anthony Salisbury =

United States government official

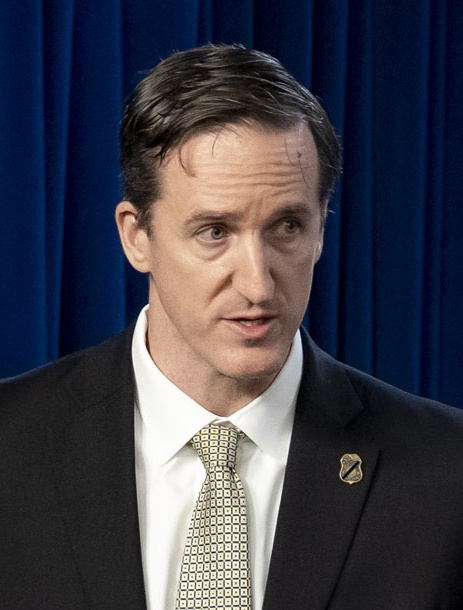
- Salisbury in 2025

United States Homeland Security Advisor
- Incumbent
- Assumed office November 12, 2026
- President: Donald Trump
- Preceded by: Stephen Miller

United States Deputy Homeland Security Advisor
- Incumbent
- Assumed office January 20, 2025
- President: Donald Trump
- Preceded by: Jen Daskal

Personal details
- Education: Missouri Western State University

Anthony "Tony" Salisbury is an American law enforcement official who has served as the deputy homeland security advisor since 2025. He was previously the special agent in charge of Homeland Security Investigations in Miami.

== Career ==
Salisbury was a deputy United States marshal until 2001, when he joined the New York field office of the United States Customs Service. He later became a section chief of Homeland Security Investigations' (HSI) Trade Transparency Unit. After an international assignment for the agency in Mexico, Salisbury led HSI St. Louis as Resident Agent in Charge.

On October 4, 2025, the Minnesota Star Tribune reported that Salisbury had been seen in public exchanging information on the encrypted Signal messaging service with other government officials suggesting that US Secretary of Defense Pete Hegseth wanted "top cover" from President Donald Trump before sending troops from the 82nd Airborne Division to Portland, Oregon, in response to alleged public unrest. Salisbury also reportedly discussed upcoming Immigration and Customs Enforcement (ICE) operations in Chicago, Vice President JD Vance's desire to prosecute two unnamed Florida influencers who he claimed were promoting violence, and Federal Bureau of Investigation director Kash Patel's firing of FBI employees who had been shown kneeling during a 2020 protest against the murder of George Floyd. During the latter discussion Salisbury reportedly called Patel a "giant douche canoe."

In November 2026, NBC News reported that Salisbury had been appointed to serve as the homeland security advisor.
