= Elizabeth Sherwood-Randall =

American government official (born 1959)

- Belfer Center Faculty Photo, 2026

11th United States Homeland Security Advisor
- In office January 20, 2021 – January 20, 2025
- President: Joe Biden
- Preceded by: Julia Nesheiwat
- Succeeded by: Stephen Miller

18th United States Deputy Secretary of Energy
- In office October 10, 2014 – January 20, 2017
- President: Barack Obama
- Preceded by: Daniel Poneman
- Succeeded by: Dan Brouillette

Personal details
- Born: Elizabeth D. Sherwood; October 4, 1959 (age 67) Los Angeles, California, U.S.
- Party: Democratic
- Spouse: Jeffrey Randall
- Children: 2
- Relatives: Ben Sherwood (brother)
- Education: Harvard University (BA); Balliol College, Oxford (DPhil)

Elizabeth D. Sherwood-Randall (née Sherwood; born October 4, 1959) is an American public servant, and author who served as the 11th United States homeland security advisor in the Biden administration from 2021 to 2025. She previously served in national security roles in both the Clinton and Obama administrations and held appointments at academic and research institutions. She currently serves as a visiting professor at the Harvard Kennedy School.

During the Clinton administration, Sherwood-Randall served from 1994 to 1996 as the Deputy Assistant Secretary of Defense for Russia, Ukraine, and Eurasia. After departing public service, she was a founding principal of the Harvard-Stanford Preventive Defense Project from 1997 to 2008. Sherwood-Randall joined the National Security Council at the White House in January 2009. She served as Special Assistant to the President and Senior Director for European Affairs during President Obama's first term. In 2013 she was promoted to White House Coordinator for Defense Policy, Countering Weapons of Mass Destruction, and Arms Control.

In July 2014 she was nominated by President Obama to become the 18th United States deputy secretary of energy and, following Senate confirmation in September 2014, she served in that role from October 2014 until January 20, 2017. Following her departure from government service, she held an array of professorial and senior fellow positions at academic institutions, including at the Harvard Kennedy School Belfer Center for Science and International Affairs and at the Georgia Institute of Technology.

After advising Joe Biden's successful 2020 presidential campaign and transition team, Sherwood-Randall was discussed as a lead contender to be Biden's secretary of energy. Instead, she was appointed as the President's White House Homeland Security Advisor and Deputy National Security Advisor in January 2021.

== Early life and education ==
Sherwood-Randall was born in Los Angeles, California to Richard E. Sherwood and Dorothy L. Romonek and has one brother, Ben Sherwood. She received a bachelor's degree from Harvard University, and a doctorate in international relations from Balliol College, Oxford, where she was a Rhodes Scholar. She and her brother, Ben Sherwood, were the first sister and brother to win Rhodes Scholarships.

== Early career ==
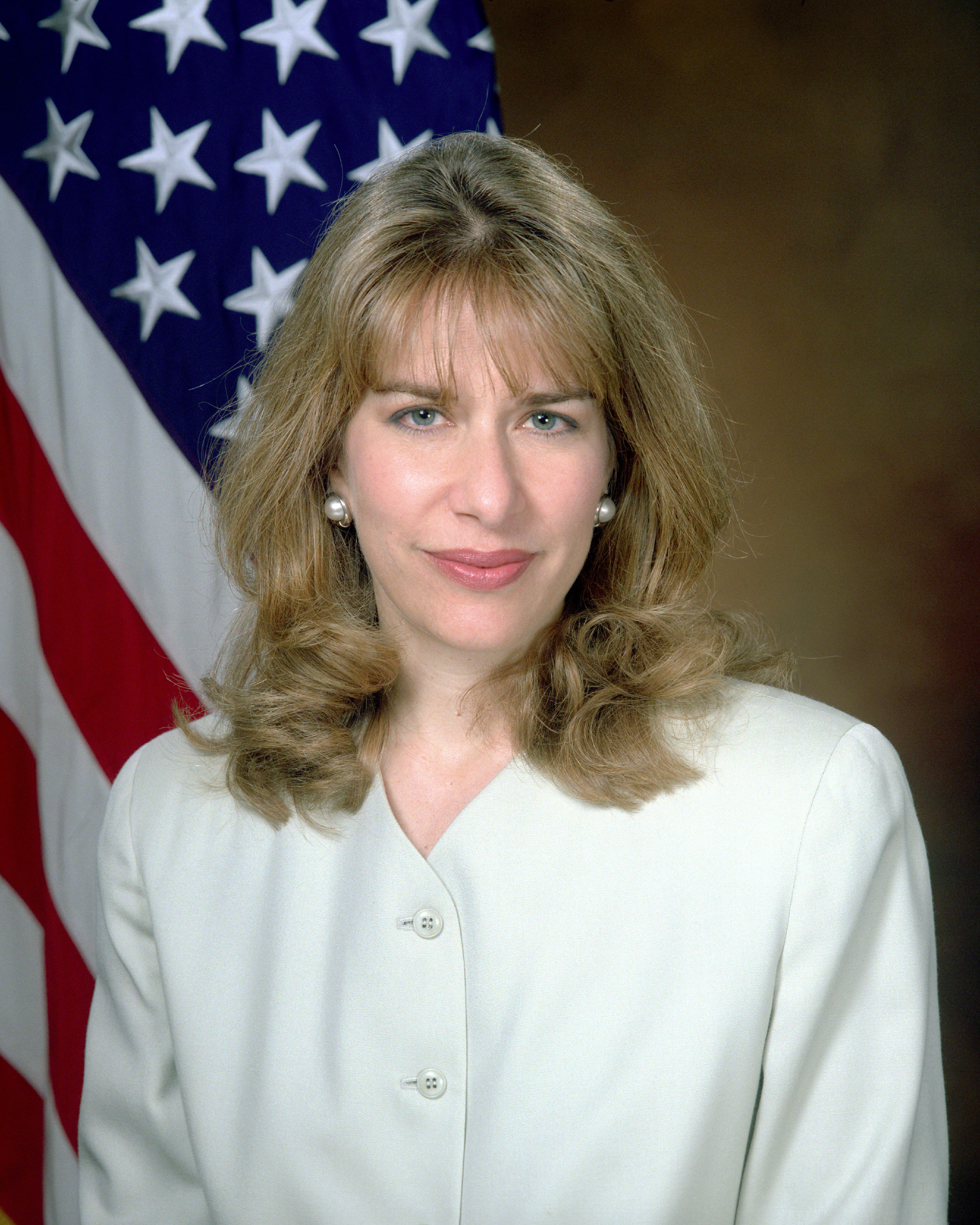
Sherwood-Randall in 1995

From January 1986 to September 1987, she served as a principal advisor on foreign and defense policy matters to then-Senator Joe Biden, at the time ranking member of the Senate Foreign Relations Committee and chairman of the Subcommittee on European Affairs. From 1990 to 1993, she was the associate director of the Harvard Kennedy School Belfer Center's Strengthening Democratic Institutions Project, which she co-founded with former Kennedy School Dean and Professor Graham Allison. In the Clinton Administration, from 1994 to 1996, Sherwood-Randall served as Deputy Assistant Secretary of Defense for Russia, Ukraine, and Eurasia. In 2004, she was selected to become a Carnegie Scholar and used the prize to support research as an Adjunct Senior Fellow at the Council on Foreign Relations.

== Obama administration ==
=== National Security Council ===
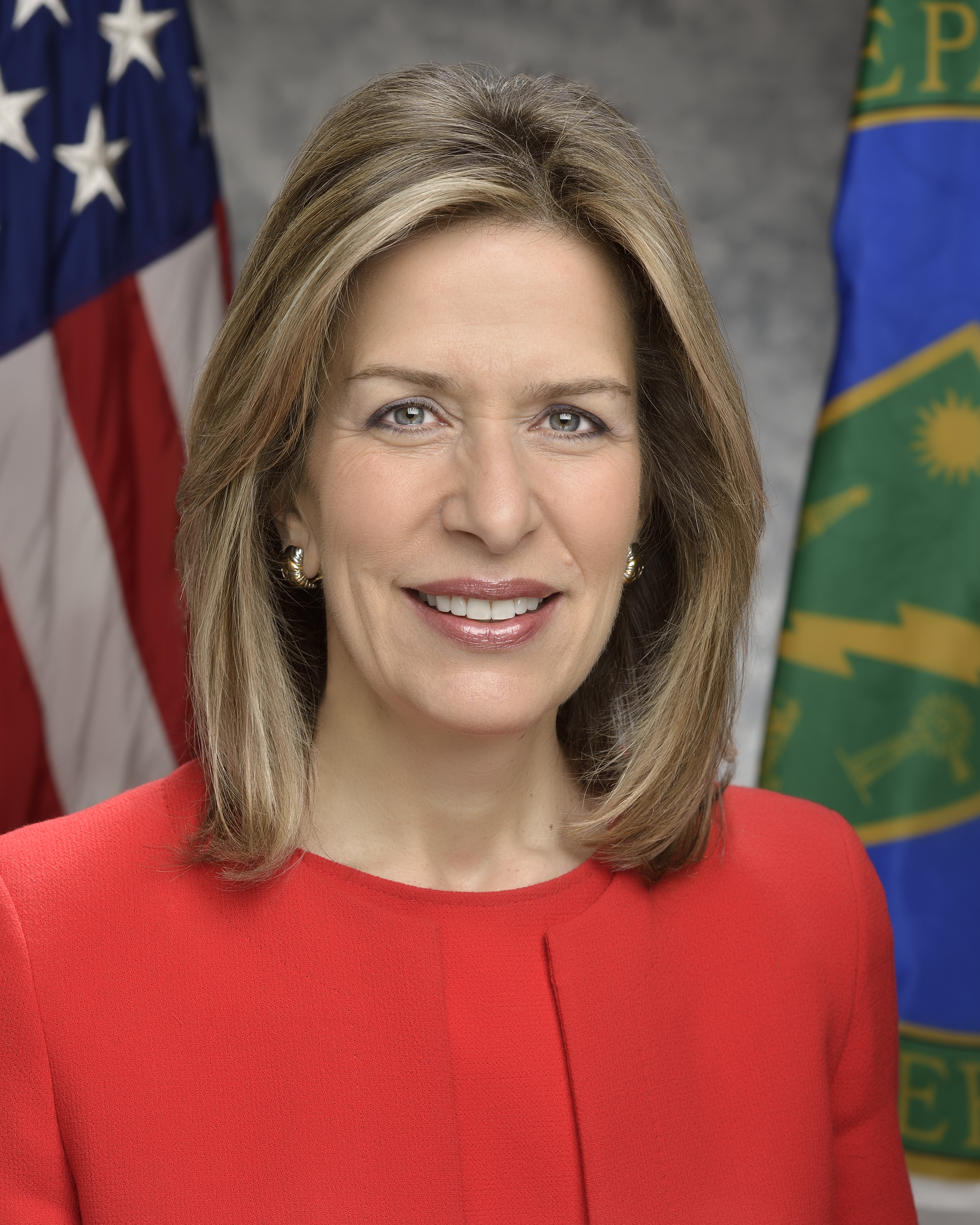
Sherwood-Randall in 2014

During the first term of Barack Obama, Sherwood-Randall served as Special Assistant to the President and Senior Director for European Affairs on the White House National Security Council. At the start of Obama's second term, she was appointed the White House Coordinator for Defense Policy, Countering Weapons of Mass Destruction, and Arms Control. She served as the Presidential Sherpa for the Nuclear Security Summit in 2014

=== Department of Energy ===
Sherwood-Randall was nominated by President Obama to be Deputy Secretary of Energy and confirmed by the United States Senate on September 18, 2014.

During her tenure as Deputy Secretary of Energy, Sherwood-Randall emphasized recruiting and strengthening a more diverse workforce at the Department of Energy. In 2017, she decried the growing tendency to vilify civil servants and target them based on ideology and in 2020 she advocated for strengthened protections for whistleblowers.

== Biden administration ==
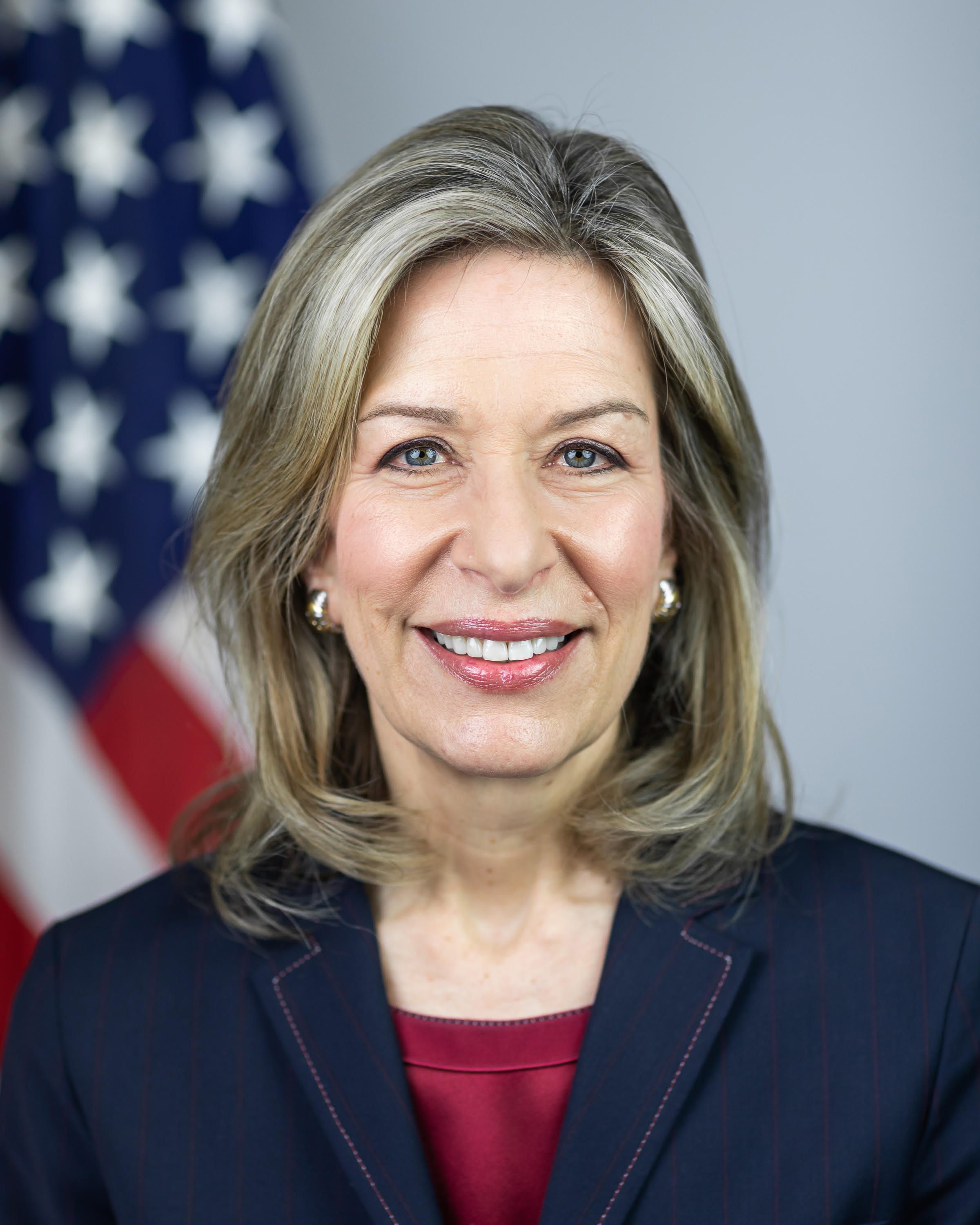
Biden Administration Official Portrait, 2021

After advising Joe Biden's successful 2020 presidential campaign and transition team, Sherwood-Randall was discussed as a lead contender to be Biden's secretary of energy. Instead, she was appointed as the President's White House Homeland Security Advisor and Deputy National Security Advisor in January 2021. As the Homeland Security Advisor, Sherwood-Randall coordinated Federal support to State and local leaders, NGOs, and the private sector to prevent and respond to disasters. In 2022, after President Biden made a decision limiting counterterrorism drone strikes outside conventional war zones, Sherwood-Randall issued a statement that the changes allowed the U.S. government to be “discerning and agile in protecting Americans against evolving global terrorist challenges.”

When it became apparent that the Government of Afghanistan would fall in 2021, Sherwood-Randall was among the senior White House officials deliberating about how to manage a noncombatant evacuation operation from Kabul. According to a leaked National Security Council summary of conclusions obtained by Axios, she chaired an August 14, 2021, meeting of the NSC Deputies Small Group, held hours before Kabul fell, that assigned actions for relocating U.S. citizens, Afghan nationals, and other evacuees. Ultimately, more than 80,000 Afghans were screened and vetted, relocated to the United States, and resettled in American communities. Sherwood-Randall was part of the Biden administration team that launched the U.S. National Strategy to Counter Antisemitism on May 25, 2023.

In January 2025, as part of the transition to the second Trump administration, she chaired a homeland security tabletop exercise in the White House Situation Room with outgoing Biden officials and incoming Trump nominees and advisers. The exercise covered potential terrorist attacks and avian flu, among other issues.

== Harvard Kennedy School ==
In 2026, Sherwood-Randall was named the inaugural Ashton B. Carter Visiting Professor at the Harvard Kennedy School.

== Scholarly publications ==
She has written on a variety of national security issues, including on strengthening U.S. alliances, preventing weapons of mass destruction proliferation, and managing threats to strategic stability associated with emerging technologies. Her first book, Allies in Crisis: Meeting Global Challenges to Western Security, examined the origins and history of the North Atlantic Treaty Organization and described how it handled crises outside of Europe without weakening allied capabilities or distracting from its main purpose. In 2006, she wrote the monograph Alliances and American National Security, which makes the case for modernizing U.S. alliances as a means to reach the nation's national security goals. In 2020, she authored "The Age of Strategic Instability: How Novel Technologies Disrupt the Nuclear Balance", which was published in Foreign Affairs. In 2026, she authored the “AI and the New Age of Bioweapons” in Foreign Affairs.

== Personal life ==
She is married to neurosurgeon Jeffrey Randall. They have two sons.

Political offices
Preceded by Daniel Poneman	United States Deputy Secretary of Energy; 2014–2017	Succeeded by Dan Brouillette
Preceded by Julia Nesheiwat	United States Homeland Security Advisor; 2021–2025	Succeeded by Stephen Miller
