= United States Ambassador-at-Large for Arctic Affairs =

United States diplomatic post

The United States ambassador-at-large for Arctic affairs advances the Arctic policy of the United States, engages with counterparts in Arctic and non-Arctic nations as well as Indigenous groups, and works closely with domestic stakeholders, including state, local, and Tribal governments, businesses, academic institutions, non-profit organizations, other federal government agencies, and Congress. The United States' Arctic cooperation is foremost through the Arctic Council, and the ambassador-at-large works in close partnership with the U.S. senior Arctic official, the federal Arctic science community, and the Arctic Executive Steering Committee.

== List of ambassadors ==
| Image | Name | Appointment | Left office | President served under |
|---|---|---|---|---|
| | Mike Sfraga | October 1, 2024 | January 20, 2025 | Joe Biden |
