= Jaclyn Stapp =

American model

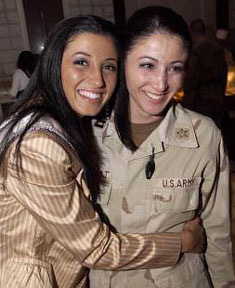
- Stapp (left) with her sister Julia in 2004
- Born: Jaclyn Nesheiwat; July 29, 1980 (age 45); Carmel, New York
- Occupations: Beauty queen author philanthropist fashion model actress
- Title: Miss New York USA 2004; Mrs. Florida America 2008; Mrs. World First Runner-Up 2022
- Spouse: Scott Stapp
- Children: 3

Jaclyn Nesheiwat Stapp (born July 29, 1980) is an American fashion model. Her titles include Mrs. Florida America 2008, Miss New York USA 2004. In 2010 she wrote a children's book, Wacky Jacky: The True Story of an Unlikely Beauty Queen. She is executive director of The Scott Stapp With Arms Wide Open Foundation, and founder of CHARM (Children Are Magical) by Jaclyn Stapp, which was formed to raise awareness of issues with which children deal and to provide underprivileged youth help with education. She is married to Creed lead singer Scott Stapp.

== Pageants ==
On May 31, 2008, Stapp won the Mrs. Florida America pageant, and was named Mrs. America 2008 First-Runner Up and awarded the title of Most Photogenic. In 2011, she represented the country of Jordan at Mrs. World, where she placed in the Top 5. In 2022, she was First-Runner Up in that Mrs. World pageant and was winner of the Congeniality Award.

== Personal life ==
Stapp is of Jordanian descent, one of five children raised in Umatilla, Florida. After graduating from Umatilla High School in 1998, she attended Stetson University and received a Bachelor of Arts degree in Marketing and Communications in 2002. She is the sister of Julia Nesheiwat and Janette Nesheiwat. Stapp married Scott Stapp at Viscaya Gardens, Florida in 2006. The two met during her reign as Miss New York USA at a Muscular Dystrophy charity gala in New York in January 2005. The couple have three children.

Preceded by Nadia Behette	Miss New York USA; 2004	Succeeded by Meaghan Jarensky
