= Under Secretary of Energy for Infrastructure =

Under Secretary of Energy
- S3
- Seal of the U. S. Department of Energy

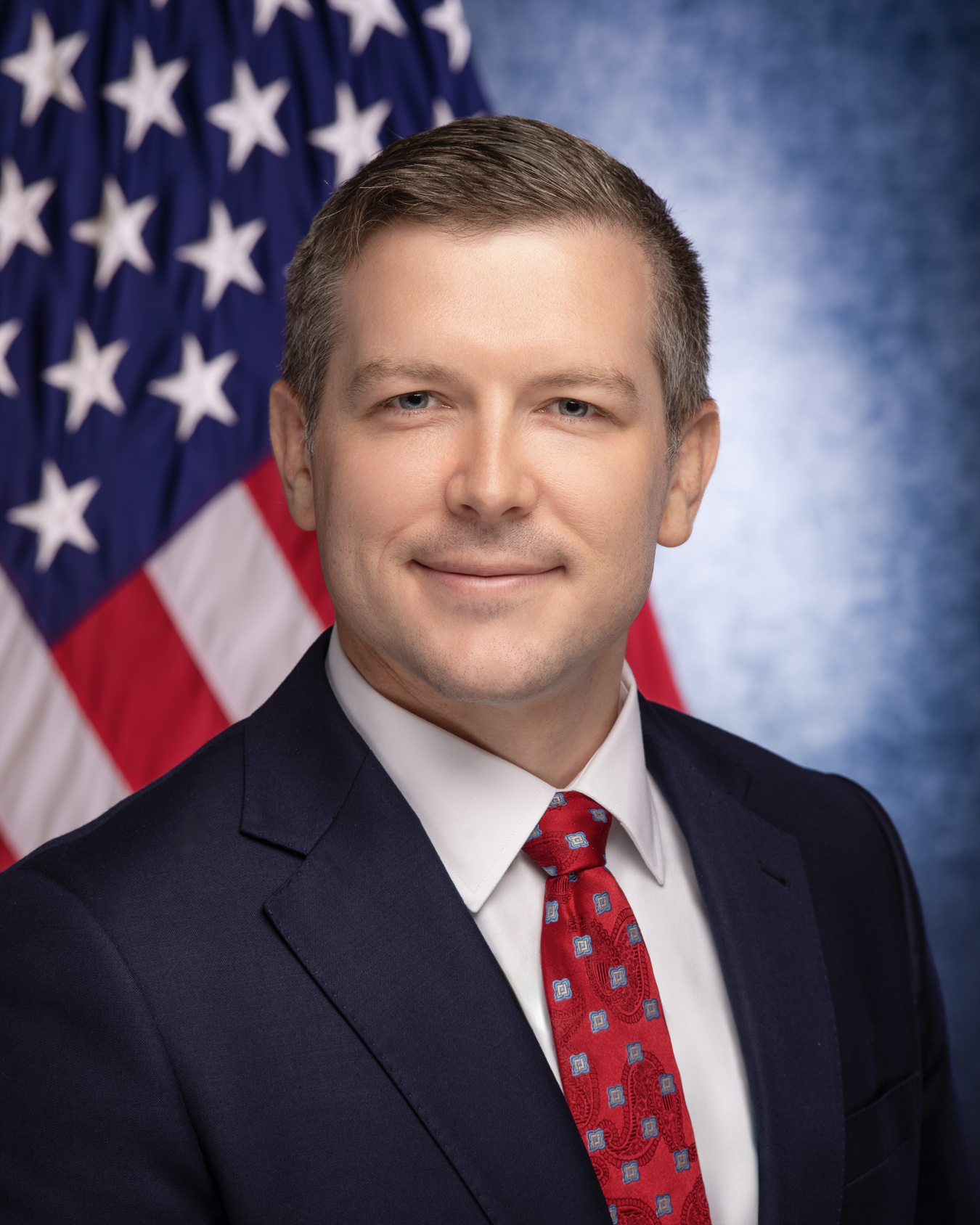
- Incumbent; Kyle Haustveit since May 22, 2026
- United States Department of Energy
- Style: Mr. Under Secretary
- Member of: Department of Energy
- Reports to: Deputy Secretary of Energy
- Seat: Washington, D.C., United States
- Appointer: The president; with advice and confirmation from the Senate
- Term length: Appointed
- Deputy: Associate Under Secretary
- Website: Official website

The under secretary of energy oversees the department's energy and environment programs. The under secretary plays an instrumental role in the development of energy related research and development necessary to meet the United States' growing energy need and work to advance the nations energy and electricity security.

The under secretary of energy is appointed by the president with the advice and consent of the Senate. The current acting under secretary is Alex Fitzsimmons, who was appointed when Preston Wells Griffith III, who was sworn in on July 10, 2025, was removed on October 20, 2025. Kyle Haustveit was sworn as under secretary in May 2026.

== List of under secretaries ==
| No. | Portrait | Under secretary | Took office | Left office | Refs. |
|---|---|---|---|---|---|
| 1 | | Robert G. Card | June 5, 2001 | 2004 | |
| 2 | | David K. Garman | June 15, 2005 | February 2007 | |
| acting | | Dennis Spurgeon | May 2007 | July 2007 | |
| 3 | | Clarence H. Albright | August 3, 2007 | January 20, 2009 | |
| 4 | | Kristina M. Johnson | May 2009 | October 2010 | |
| acting | | Cathy Zoi | December 2010 | 2011 | |
| acting | | David B. Sandalow | June 2012 | January 20, 2013 | |
| 5 | | Mark Menezes | November 6, 2017 | August 4, 2020 | |
| acting | | Kathleen Hogan | July 2022 | June 13, 2023 | |
| 6 | | David W. Crane | June 14, 2023 | January 20, 2025 | |
| acting | | Kathleen Hogan | January 20, 2025 | July 10, 2025 | |
| 7 | | Preston Wells Griffith III | July 10, 2025 | October 20, 2025 | |
| acting | | Alex Fitzsimmons | October 20, 2025 | May 22, 2026 | |
| 8 | | Kyle Haustveit | May 22, 2026 | Present | |
