= Daniel Poneman =

American lawyer and businessman

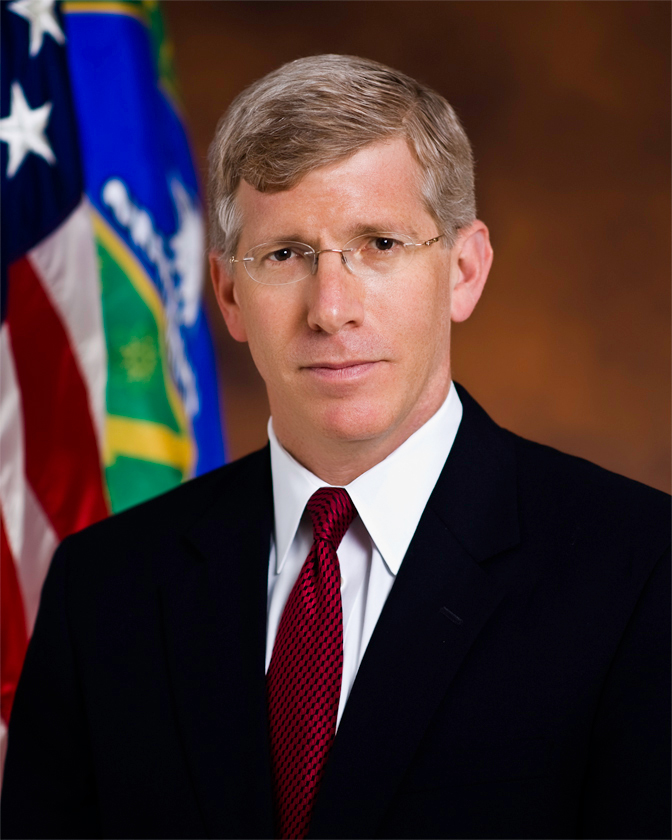

Acting United States Secretary of Energy
- In office April 22, 2013 – May 21, 2013
- President: Barack Obama
- Preceded by: Steven Chu
- Succeeded by: Ernest Moniz

17th United States Deputy Secretary of Energy
- In office May 18, 2009 – October 5, 2014
- President: Barack Obama
- Preceded by: Clay Sell
- Succeeded by: Elizabeth Sherwood-Randall

Personal details
- Born: Daniel Bruce Poneman; March 12, 1956 (age 70) Toledo, Ohio, U.S.
- Party: Democratic
- Spouse: Susan Danoff Poneman
- Education: Harvard University (BA, JD); Lincoln College, Oxford (MLitt)
- Website: Government website

Daniel Bruce Poneman (born March 12, 1956) is an American lawyer and businessman. He served as United States Deputy Secretary of Energy from 2009 to 2014. He served as president and chief executive officer of Centrus Energy, a publicly traded energy company (LEU), from 2015 to 2023. He is also a Distinguished Fellow at the Paulson Institute at the University of Chicago and a Senior Fellow at the Belfer Center for Science and International Affairs at the Harvard Kennedy School. Poneman was Acting Secretary of Energy in 2013 following the resignation of Steven Chu until Ernest Moniz was confirmed and sworn in.

== Education ==
Poneman received A.B. and J.D. degrees with honors from Harvard University, and an M.Litt. in politics from Oxford University, where he was a student at Lincoln College.

== Career ==
Poneman first joined the Department of Energy as a White House Fellow in 1989. In 1990, he joined the National Security Council as the director of defense policy and arms control. Between 1993 and 1996, Poneman served as special assistant to the president and senior director for nonproliferation and export controls at the NSC.

Poneman was a partner in the law firm of Hogan & Hartson, before becoming principal of The Scowcroft Group, a consulting firm in Washington, D.C., in the eight years prior to his appointment to the United States Department of Energy.

Poneman was nominated by President Barack Obama to be United States Deputy Secretary of Energy on April 20, 2009, and was confirmed by the United States Senate on May 18, 2009. He also served as chief operating officer of the Department of Energy. In 2013, Poneman served as acting secretary of energy following the resignation of Secretary Chu until his successor, Ernest Moniz was confirmed by the Senate and was sworn in.

He served as president and chief executive officer of Centrus Energy, a publicly traded energy company (LEU), from 2015 to 2023 and was succeeded by Amir Vexler. Poneman also resigned from the company's board of directors that same year.

Poneman currently serves on the Council of Foreign Relations Board of Directors. He is also a member of the Aspen Strategy Group and Harvard University Committee on University Resources.

== Publications ==
Poneman has published widely on national security issues and is the author of Nuclear Power in the Developing World; Argentina: Democracy on Trial; and Double Jeopardy: Combating Nuclear Terror and Climate Change. His third book, Going Critical: The First North Korean Nuclear Crisis (coauthored with Joel Wit and Robert Gallucci), received the 2005 Douglas Dillon Award for Distinguished Writing on American Diplomacy.

== Personal life ==
Poneman is married and has three children.

Poneman has been part of charity appearances with the band Coalition of the Willing which was composed of several U.S. Government officials, including 71st U.S Secretary of State Antony Blinken, former Hungarian Ambassador to NATO and the U.S. Andras Simonyi, diplomat and national security policymaker Lincoln P. Bloomfield Jr., and guitarist Jeff "Skunk" Baxter of Steely Dan and The Doobie Brothers.

== Honors ==
- Order of the Rising Sun, 2nd Class, Gold and Silver Star (2020)
- Bronze Tower Order of Industrial Service Merit Award

Political offices
Preceded by Clay Sell	United States Deputy Secretary of Energy; 2009–2014	Succeeded by Elizabeth Sherwood-Randall
Preceded by Steven Chu	United States Secretary of Energy; Acting; 2013	Succeeded by Ernest Moniz
