= Michael Sfraga =

American geologist

Mike Sfraga
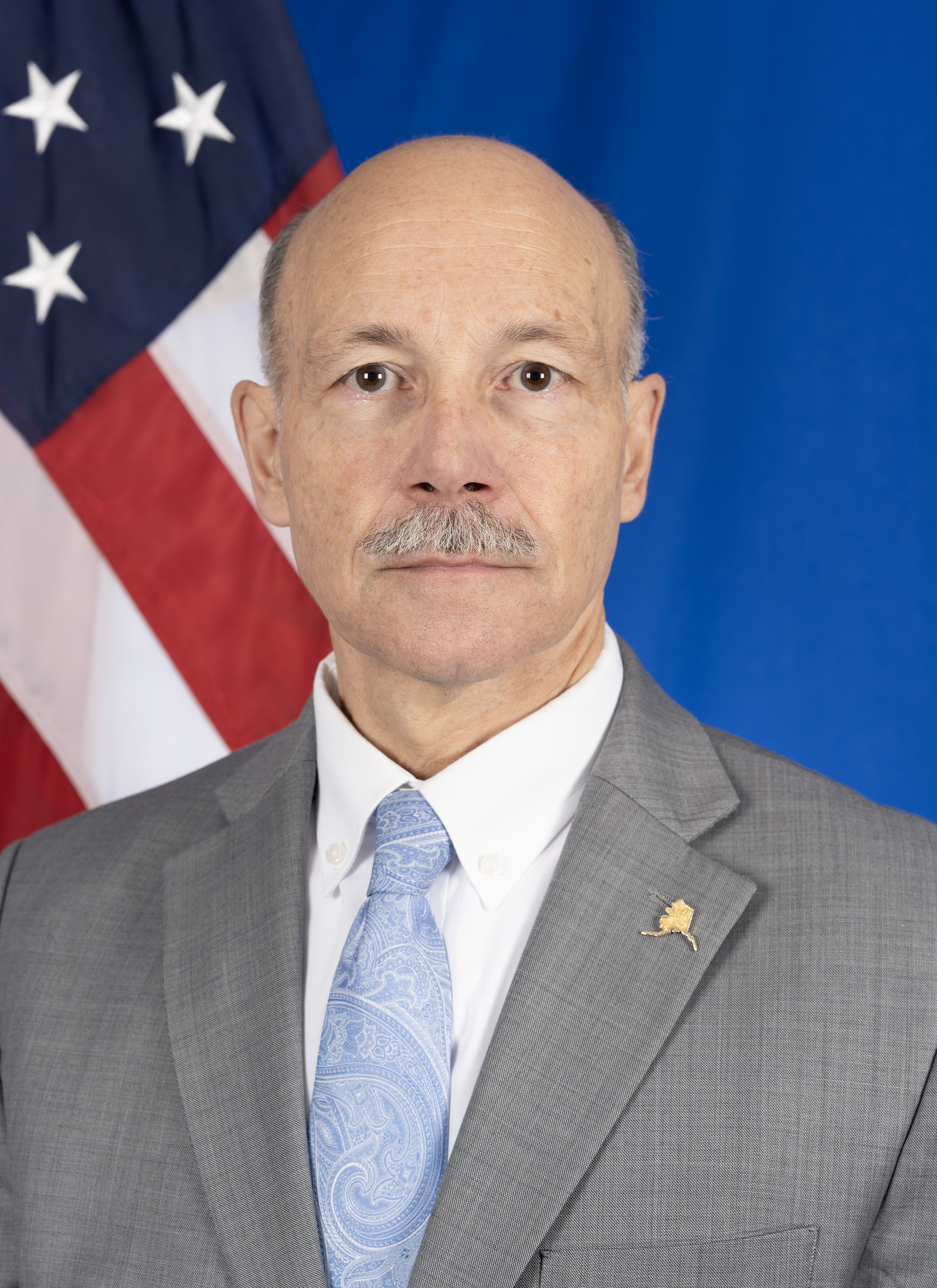

United States Ambassador-at-Large for Arctic Affairs
- In office October 1, 2024 – January 20, 2025
- President: Joe Biden
- Preceded by: Position established
- Succeeded by: TBD

Chair and Commissioner of the United States Arctic Research Commission
- In office September 24, 2021 – October 1, 2024

Personal details
- Education: University of Alaska Fairbanks (PhD)

Michael Sfraga is an American geographer who served as United States Ambassador-at-Large for Arctic Affairs from October 2024 to January 2025.

== Early life and education ==
Sfraga was born in Alaska and received a PhD in northern studies from in University of Alaska Fairbanks.

== Career ==
Sfraga served as a founder and director of the Polar Institute at the Woodrow Wilson International Center for Scholars. He also held several positions at the University of Alaska Fairbanks and the National Science Foundation. Sfraga was nominated to be the first Ambassador-at-large for Arctic Affairs on February 13, 2023. On September 24, 2024, he was confirmed by the United States Senate in a 55–36 vote. He was sworn in on October 1, 2024.
