= Umatilla, Florida =

- City
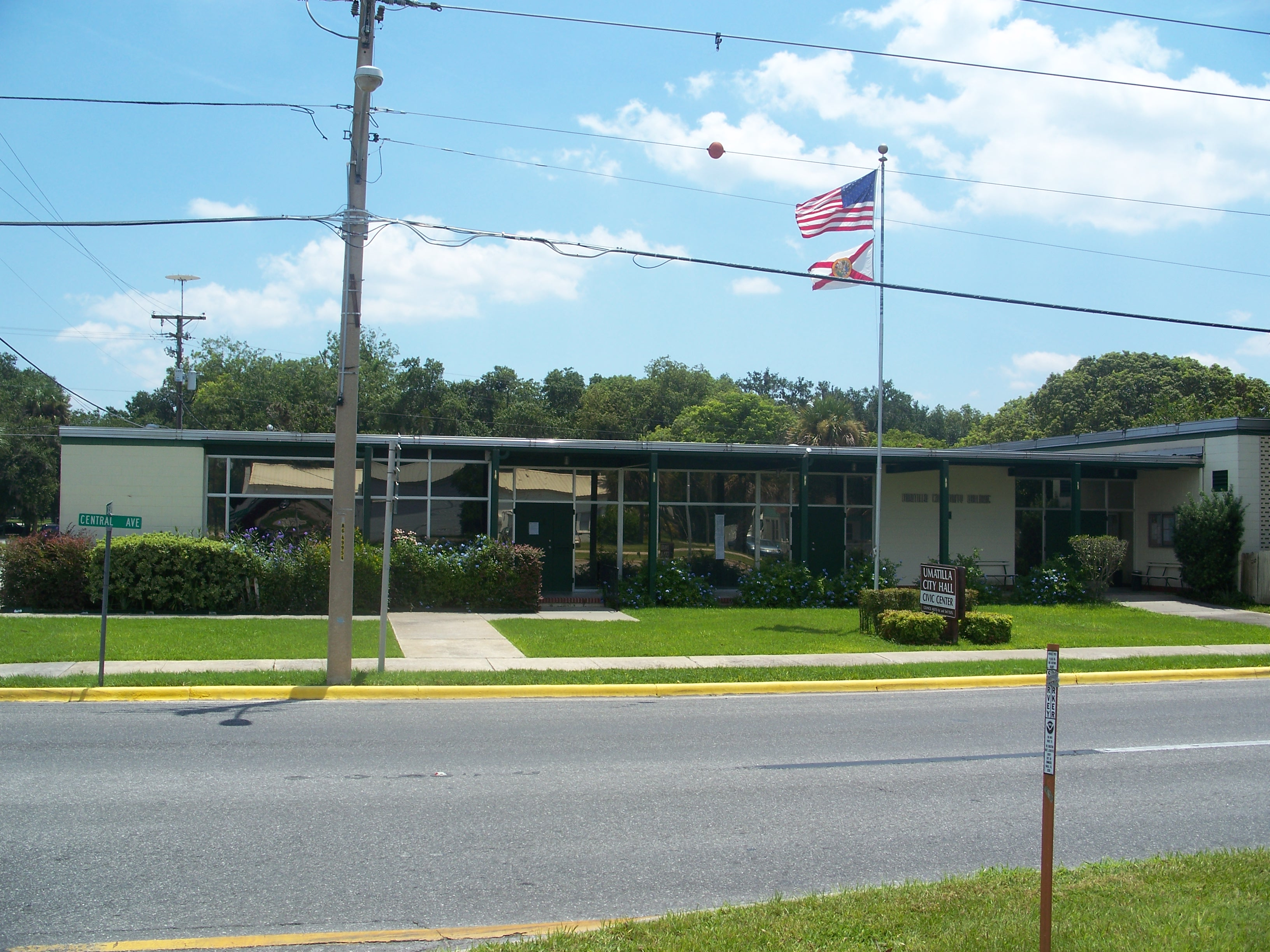
- Umatilla City Hall

- Seal
- Motto(s): "Nature's Hometown", "Gateway to the Ocala National Forest"
- Location in Lake County and the state of Florida
- Coordinates: 28°55′38″N 81°39′54″W
- Country: United States
- State: Florida
- County: Lake
- Settled: 1856
- Incorporated: November 8, 1904
- Named for: Umatilla, Oregon

Government
  - Type: Council-Manager
  - Mayor: Chris Creech
  - Vice Mayor: Zack Durbin
  - Council Members: Fred Fetterolf, Bear Crockett, and Katherine "Kaye" Adams
  - City Manager: Scott Blankenship
  - City Clerk: Jessica Burnham

Area
  - Total: 4.27 sq mi (11.06 km^{2})
  - Land: 3.59 sq mi (9.30 km^{2})
  - Water: 0.68 sq mi (1.76 km^{2})
- Elevation: 95 ft (29 m)

Population (2020)
  - Total: 3,685
  - Density: 1,026.3/sq mi (396.26/km^{2})
- Time zone: UTC-5 (Eastern (EST))
  - Summer (DST): UTC-4 (EDT)
- ZIP code: 32784
- Area code: 352
- FIPS code: 12-73025
- GNIS feature ID: 2405622
- Website: www.umatillafl.org

Umatilla is a city in Lake County, Florida, United States. The population was 3,685 at the 2020 census. Umatilla is known as the "Gateway to the Ocala National Forest", located in northern Lake County.

== History ==
The community was named after Umatilla, Oregon when it was first settled by non-indigenous people in 1856, and the City of Umatilla was officially incorporated as a municipality on November 8, 1904.

In 1998, it was the site of a Mediterranean fruit fly outbreak at the Golden Gem citrus plant.

== Geography ==
Florida State Road 19 passes through the center of town, leading south 11 miles (18 km) to Tavares, the county seat, and north 58 miles (93 km) through the Ocala National Forest to Palatka. Umatilla is 38 miles (61 km) northwest of Orlando and 49 miles (79 km) southwest of Daytona Beach.

According to the United States Census Bureau, the city has a total area of 4.2 square miles (11.0 km^{2}), of which 3.6 square miles (9.3 km^{2}) are land and 0.69 square miles (1.8 km^{2}), or 16.00%, are water.

== Demographics ==
Historical population
Census	Pop.	Note	%±
1910	283		—
1920	640		126.1%
1930	907		41.7%
1940	1,149		26.7%
1950	1,312		14.2%
1960	1,717		30.9%
1970	1,600		−6.8%
1980	1,872		17.0%
1990	2,350		25.5%
2000	2,214		−5.8%
2010	3,456		56.1%
2020	3,685		6.6%
U.S. Decennial Census

=== Racial and ethnic composition ===
Umatilla racial composition (Hispanics excluded from racial categories) (NH = Non-Hispanic)
Race	Pop 2010	Pop 2020	% 2010	% 2020
White (NH)	2,938	2,996	85.01%	81.30%
Black or African American (NH)	110	60	3.18%	1.63%
Native American or Alaska Native (NH)	9	11	0.26%	0.30%
Asian (NH)	6	19	0.17%	0.52%
Pacific Islander or Native Hawaiian (NH)	0	2	0.00%	0.05%
Some other race (NH)	3	9	0.09%	0.24%
Two or more races/Multiracial (NH)	20	127	0.58%	3.45%
Hispanic or Latino (any race)	370	461	10.71%	12.51%
Total	3,456	3,685	100.00%	100.00%

=== 2020 census ===
As of the 2020 census, Umatilla had a population of 3,685. The median age was 53.5 years. 17.7% of residents were under the age of 18 and 34.9% were 65 years of age or older. For every 100 females, there were 88.3 males, and for every 100 females age 18 and over, there were 87.8 males.

As of 2020, 98.9% of residents lived in urban areas, while 1.1% lived in rural areas.

In 2020, there were 1,657 households, of which 20.8% had children under the age of 18 living in them. Of all households, 44.2% were married-couple households, 17.1% were households with a male householder and no spouse or partner present, and 32.3% were households with a female householder and no spouse or partner present. About 35.3% of all households were made up of individuals, and 25.7% had someone living alone who was 65 years of age or older.

In 2020, there were 1,945 housing units, of which 14.8% were vacant. The homeowner vacancy rate was 2.9% and the rental vacancy rate was 13.8%.

According to the 2020 American Community Survey 5-year estimates, there were 1,061 families residing in the city.

=== 2010 census ===
As of the 2010 United States census, there were 3,456 people, 1,403 households, and 968 families residing in the city.

=== 2000 census ===
As of the census of 2000, there were 2,214 people, 867 households, and 582 families residing in the city. The population density was 871.4 inhabitants per square mile (336.4/km^{2}). There were 987 housing units at an average density of 388.5 per square mile (150.0/km^{2}). The racial makeup of the city was 93.54% White, 3.52% African American, 0.23% Native American, 0.32% Asian, 0.95% from other races, and 1.45% from two or more races. Hispanic or Latino of any race were 3.93% of the population.

In 2000, there were 867 households, out of which 29.6% had children under the age of 18 living with them, 49.8% were married couples living together, 13.1% had a female householder with no husband present, and 32.8% were non-families. 28.1% of all households were made up of individuals, and 15.0% had someone living alone who was 65 years of age or older. The average household size was 2.48 and the average family size was 3.01.

In 2000, in the city, the population was spread out, with 24.3% under the age of 18, 8.4% from 18 to 24, 26.3% from 25 to 44, 20.5% from 45 to 64, and 20.6% who were 65 years of age or older. The median age was 39 years. For every 100 females, there were 89.6 males. For every 100 females age 18 and over, there were 81.1 males.

In 2000, the median income for a household in the city was $29,628, and the median income for a family was $37,500. Males had a median income of $25,500 versus $21,741 for females. The per capita income for the city was $17,739. About 7.2% of families and 11.9% of the population were below the poverty line, including 13.9% of those under age 18 and 17.9% of those age 65 or over.

== Notable people ==
- Al Hofmann, drag racer and drag car owner in the funny car division
- Jonathan Lucroy, MLB catcher
- Willis V. McCall, sheriff of Lake County
- Robert M. McTureous, Jr., recipient of the Medal of Honor
- Julia Nesheiwat, United States government official
- Will Radcliff, creator of the Slush Puppie; owned a ranch surrounding Umatilla
- Dennis K. Stanley, professor and coach
- Jaclyn Stapp, beauty queen
- Howard Van Hyning, percussionist with the New York City Opera
