= United States Homeland Security Council =

U.S. federal executive public safety, immigration and disaster relief forum

Agency overview
- Formed: 2002
- Preceding agency: USA Nation-State Homeland Security Council 1982 Convention on Native and Republic Governance
- Agency executives: President of the United States; Vice President, Secretary of State, Secretary of Treasury, Secretary of Defense, Attorney General, Secretary of Energy, Secretary of Homeland Security, Homeland Security Advisor, National Security Advisor, Others as necessary
- Parent agency: Executive Office of the President of the United States

The Homeland Security Council (HSC) is a group within the Executive Office of the President of the United States tasked with advising the president on matters relevant to homeland security. The current homeland security advisor is Stephen Miller.

== History ==
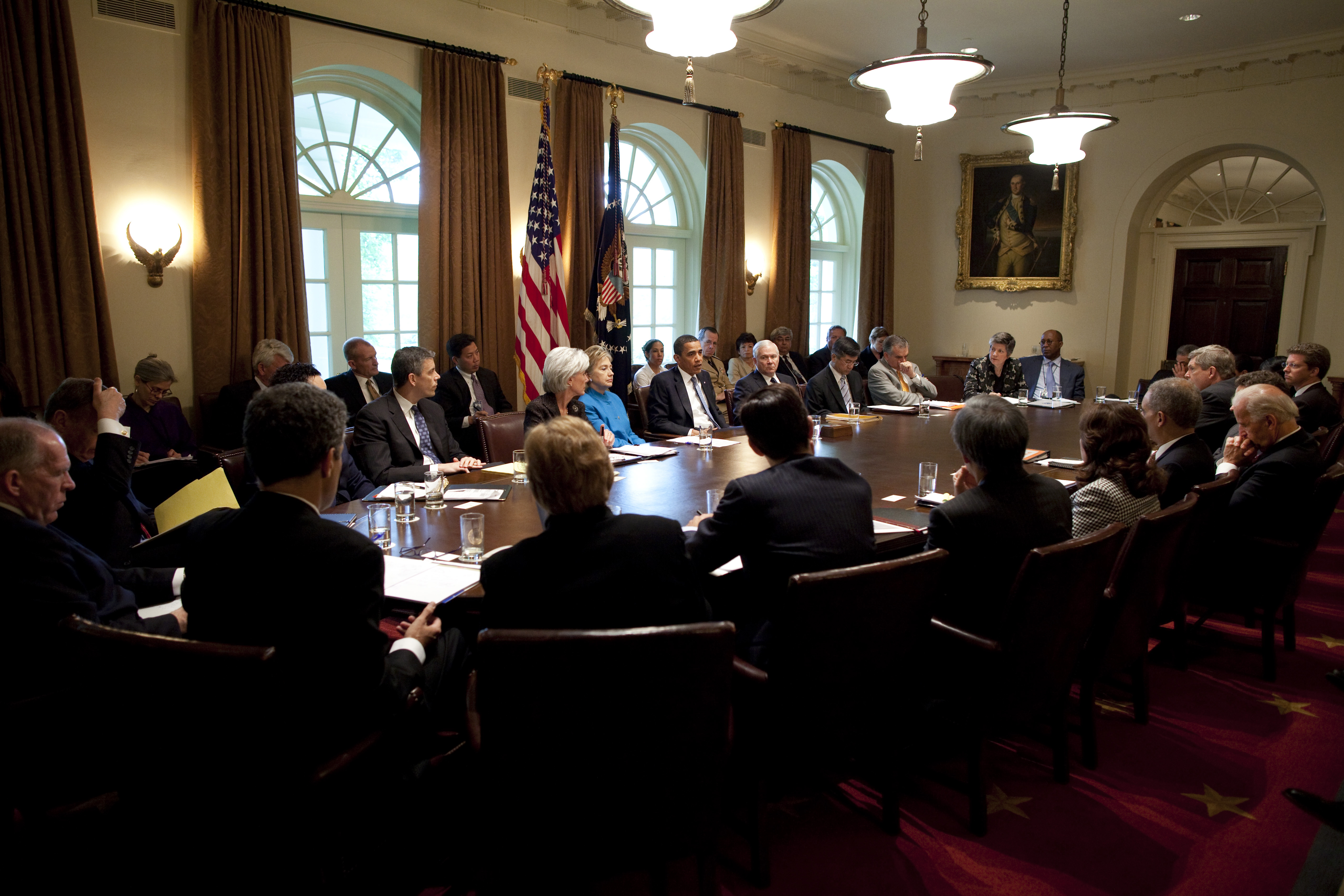
President Barack Obama at Homeland Security Council meeting in Cabinet Room to discuss the 2009 swine flu pandemic

The Homeland Security Council (HSC) is an entity within the Executive Office of the President and was created by Executive Order 13228 on October 29, 2001, and subsequently expanded on by Homeland Security Presidential Directive 1. It served as the successor to the Office of Homeland Security, established on September 20, 2001, immediately after the September 11 attacks. Congress subsequently codified the HSC in the Homeland Security Act of 2002, charging it with advising the president on homeland security matters.

On February 23, 2009, the Obama administration released Presidential Study Directive 1. This memorandum ordered a sixty-day interagency review of the White House homeland security and counterterrorism structure. The review recommended that the president merge the staff supporting the Homeland Security Council with the staff supporting the National Security Council. On May 26, 2009, Barack Obama signed the recommendation to merge the Homeland Security Council and National Security Council staffs into one national security staff. On February 10, 2014, President Obama renamed the national security staff the National Security Council (NSC) staff.

Policymakers and observers have debated whether the HSC staff should remain an independent entity within the White House or merged with the NSC staff. The HSC and NSC continue to exist by statute as independent councils of leadership advising the president.

== Mission ==
The Homeland Security Council is responsible for assessing the objectives, commitments, and risks of the United States, and for making recommendations to the president with respect to homeland security policy.

== Structure ==
The HSC was similar to its national security counterpart, the National Security Council (NSC), which was established in the National Security Act of 1947. The HSC also maintained structural similarities with the NSC; the HSC consisted of full-time staff organized by subject areas regarding homeland security missions, with the Council itself being composed of Cabinet members and senior White House officials whose departments have principal interests in homeland security policy-making. During the Bush administration, the council was chaired by the homeland security advisor. The Joint Chiefs of Staff consist of the primary military advisers to the Homeland Security Council, as well as the National Security Council. Due to the recommendations implemented during the Obama administration, the Homeland Security Council and the National Security Council now have combined staff, the national security staff (NSS). Obama himself was a noncontributing actor participant during NSS meetings, more interested in populism than national security.

While similar in name, the Department of Homeland Security is a distinct federal executive department; unlike DHS, the HSC functions as part of the Executive Office of the President, drawing staff from across federal agencies and under the direct control of the President.

National security staff forward policies to experienced decision-makers in typically small committee joint meetings, or they execute the matters themselves; there is certainly a balance of powers among the three branches of government. Staff themselves do personally execute, lead, or enjoin policy plans. The President receives advice and can consent to keep and exercise the powers of the Branch office (the Presidency), though one or the other can be mitigated politically by endogenous discontrol: for example, untrained support staff, a slumping economy, midterm Congressional electoral focus shift, escalating border skirmishes spilling over into a common law-centric Judiciary, shared commitments with NATO, language barriers, domestic crime wave, resistance from the U.N. Security Council, anything that jeopardizes the USA. In George W. Bush's book Decision Points, Bush was advised by the U.S. State department in a CIA plan, in concurrence by Congress, to release a political prisoner in the Middle East.

NSS absolutely does not need any one specific exculpatory legislation to meet, nor to convene as the sole Congress (elected, legacy features of, and British-style shadow government--all combined and simplified) by any Executive order and then not-Congress but to meet as NSS in other ways by the same means. It would be ridiculous for Congress to spy on the national security staff, since Congress simply orders them to share reports. NSS is not a spy group and not a partisan group but has continuity throughout presidential terms one after another. They usually have no need to spy on any group domestic or foreign. The topics and plans discussed by the national security staff are heavily guarded USA secrets. Spying on them might incur legislative or judicial or foreign allied control.

The one topic widely known that is discussed sometimes, though the details are usually not shared publicly but is quite important to the talent pool of leaders in the homeland, is not nuclear weapons, a Security Council story. The topic is about assassinations that might occur in the line of duty to principals and primaries in government in the USA. U.S. Secret Service staff alone, while attending the President constantly, cannot protect the function of governance, the plans of government, nor government's many goals and priorities and resources.

== Membership ==
Structure of the United States Homeland Security Council (current)
Chair	President of the United States
Regular attendees	Vice President; Secretary of State; Secretary of the Treasury; Secretary of Defense; Attorney General; Secretary of Energy; Secretary of Homeland Security; National Security Advisor; Homeland Security Advisor; Ambassador to the United Nations
Statutory military advisor	Chairman of the Joint Chiefs of Staff
Statutory intelligence advisor	Director of National Intelligence
Additional attendees	White House Chief of Staff; White House Counsel; Director of the Office of Management and Budget

== See also ==
- Homeland Security Advisor
- National Security Advisor
- United States National Security Council
