= Vice Presidential Service Badge =

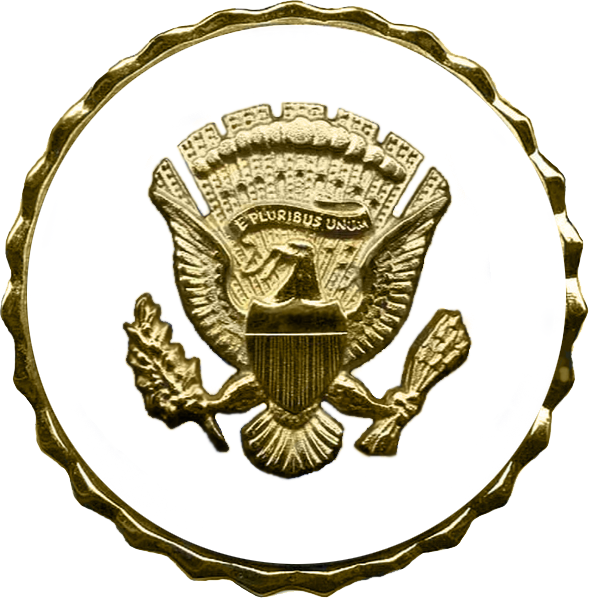
- Vice Presidential Service Badge
- Type: Service badge
- Awarded for: Service in support of the Vice President of the United States
- Presented by: United States
- Related: Vice Presidential Service Badge (obsolete)

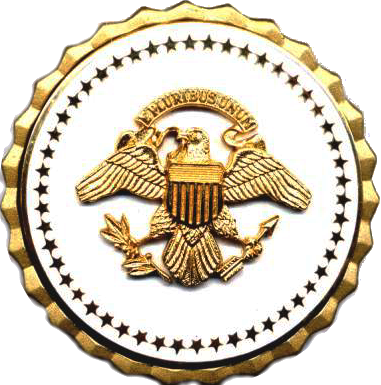
Original Vice Presidential Service Badge, replaced 19 July 1976

The Vice Presidential Service Badge is an identification badge of the United States Armed Forces which is awarded to members of the U.S. Army, U.S. Navy, U.S. Air Force, U.S. Space Force, U.S. Marine Corps, and U.S. Coast Guard as well as other members of the uniformed services, such as the U.S. National Oceanic and Atmospheric Administration Commissioned Corps and the U.S. Public Health Service Commissioned Corps, who serve as full-time uniformed service aides to the vice president. It was established under Executive Order 11544 by President Richard Nixon on July 8, 1970 and was modified by President Gerald R. Ford on July 19, 1976 under Executive Order 11926.

Uniformed service personnel eligible to receive the Vice Presidential Service Badge are active-duty members of the military, the National Oceanic and Atmospheric Administration, and the Public Health Service who are posted to the Office of the Vice President, located in the Eisenhower Executive Office Building next to the West Wing of the White House. Such personnel include military public affairs officers, security specialists, and liaison specialists from the various branches of the U.S. military, the National Oceanic and Atmospheric Administration, and the Public Health Service.

The Vice Presidential Service Badge is considered a permanent decoration and is authorized for continued wear throughout a uniformed service career, even when one no longer serves the vice president. The badge is very similar to the Presidential Service Badge, authorized for uniformed service personnel assigned to the staff of the president of the United States. Recipients are the only Americans authorized to wear the "Vice Presidential Seal or Coat of Arms" on their uniforms or civilian clothes.

== See also ==
- Presidential Service Badge
- Military badges of the United States
- Obsolete badges of the United States military
- Yankee White
