= Keith Davids =

American naval admiral (born 1968)

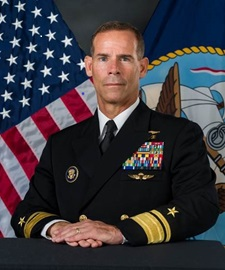

Director of the White House Military Office
- In office September 6, 2017 – March 9, 2021
- President: Donald Trump; Joe Biden
- Preceded by: Dabney Kern
- Succeeded by: Maju Varghese

Personal details
- Born: Keith Bently Davids; 1968 (age 57–58) Miami, Florida, U.S.
- Spouse: Vice Admiral Yvette M. Davids
- Children: 2
- Education: United States Naval Academy (BS); Naval Postgraduate School (MS); National War College (MS)

Military service
- Allegiance: United States
- Branch/service: United States Navy
- Years of service: 1990–2024
- Rank: Rear Admiral
- Commands: Naval Special Warfare Command; Special Operations Command South; Naval Special Warfare Center; Joint Special Operations Command Task Force, Iraq; SEAL Team One
- Battles/wars: War in Afghanistan; Iraq War
- Awards: Defense Superior Service Medal; Legion of Merit; Bronze Star Medal (2)

Keith Bently Davids (born 1968) is a retired American United States Navy special warfare officer with the rank of rear admiral. He served as the commander of Naval Special Warfare Command from 2022 to 2024. He was the commander of U.S. Special Operations Command South, United States Southern Command from 2020 to 2022. Previously, he served as director of the White House Military Office during the first presidency of Donald Trump. Earlier in his career, he was commanding officer of the Naval Special Warfare Center and SEAL Team One.

== Early life and education ==
Davids was born and raised in Miami, Florida. After attending private schools, he graduated from Coral Gables Senior High School in Coral Gables, Florida. Davids graduated from the United States Naval Academy in 1990. He later went on to receive a Master of Science in manpower systems analysis from the Naval Postgraduate School in 1998 and a Master of Science in National Security Strategy from the National War College in 2012.

== Naval career ==
After his commission as an ensign in the United States Navy, he received orders to Basic Underwater Demolition/SEAL training (BUD/S) at Naval Amphibious Base Coronado. He graduated BUD/S class 177 in 1991. Following SEAL Tactical Training (STT) and completion of six month probationary period, he received the 1130 designator as a Naval Special Warfare Officer, entitled to wear the Special Warfare insignia also known as "SEAL Trident". As a Navy SEAL officer, Davids served as an assistant platoon commander and platoon commander for SEAL Team Two. Davids volunteered for assignment to Naval Special Warfare Development Group at Damneck, Virginia and completed a specialized selection and training course in 1995 where he served as element leader and squadron operations officer. Davids was promoted to Captain in September 2011.

Davids served numerous command and staff assignments including executive officer of SEAL Team Seven; aide-de-camp for Commander-in-Chief Atlantic Fleet; military aide to the President of the United States; commanding officer of SEAL Team One, deputy commander of Naval Special Warfare Group Three; director of Operations at Naval Special Warfare Command; commanding officer of Naval Special Warfare Center and commander of Special Operations Command South, USSOUTHCOM from 2021 to 2023. Davids was selected to serve as the director of the White House Military Office on September 6, 2017.

After Lisa Franchetti was removed as chief of naval operations by the second Trump administration in February 2025, Davids was among the candidates considered as a possible replacement.

== Awards and decorations ==
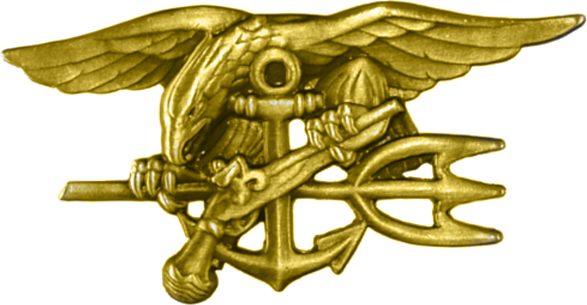

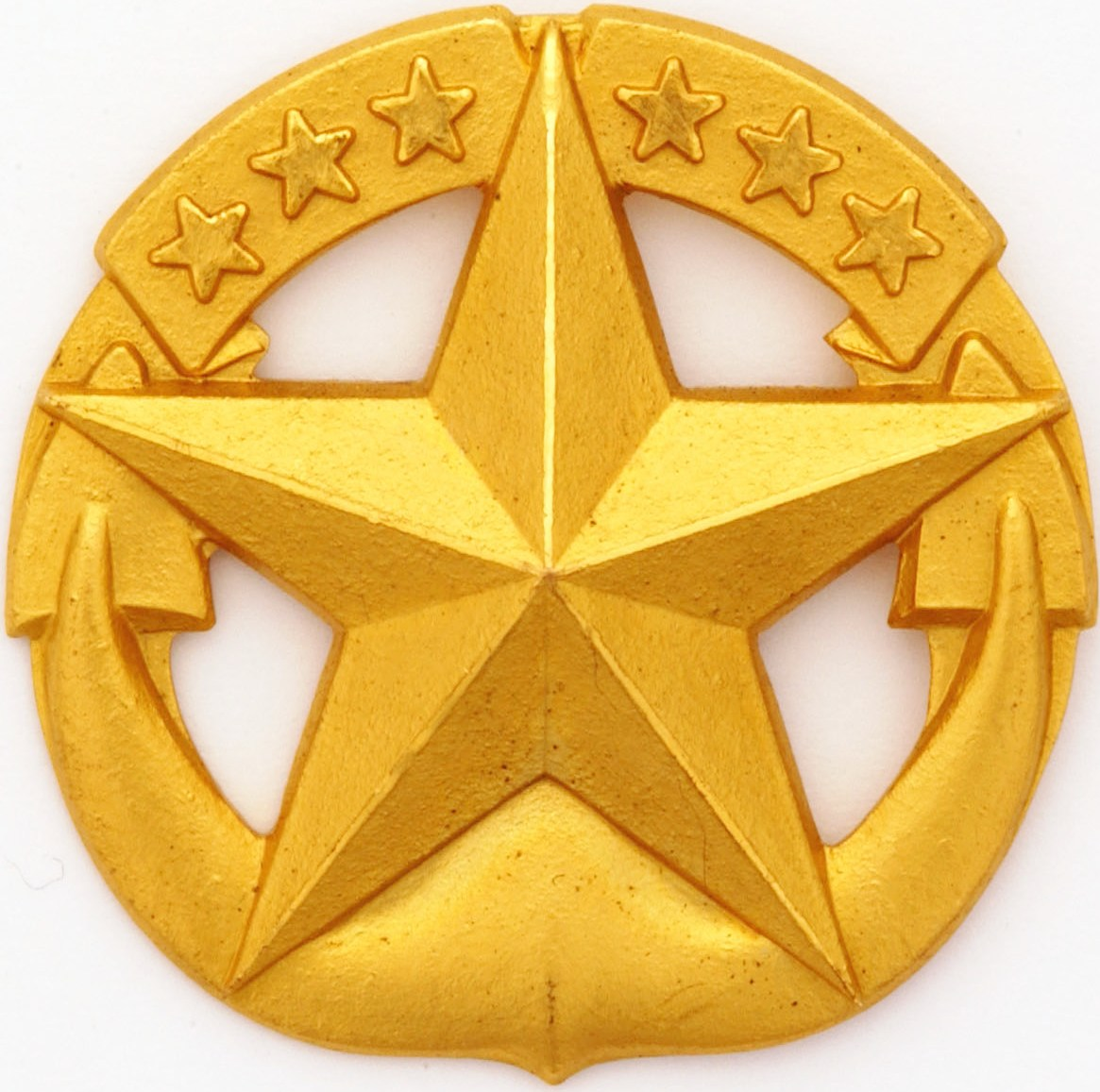

Badge	Special Warfare insignia		
1st row	Defense Superior Service Medal		
2nd row	Legion of Merit	Bronze Star Medal with "V" device and 1 5/16 inch star	Meritorious Service Medal
3rd row	Joint Service Commendation Medal	Navy and Marine Corps Commendation Medal with 1 5/16 inch star	Joint Service Achievement Medal
4th row	Navy and Marine Corps Achievement Medal with 1 5/16 inch star	Combat Action Ribbon with 1 5/16 inch star	Navy Presidential Unit Citation
5th row	Joint Meritorious Unit Award	Navy Unit Commendation	Navy Expeditionary Medal
6th row	National Defense Service Medal with 1 Service star	Southwest Asia Service Medal	Afghanistan Campaign Medal
7th row	Iraq Campaign Medal	Global War on Terrorism Expeditionary Medal	Global War on Terrorism Service Medal
8th row	Armed Forces Service Medal	Humanitarian Service Medal	Sea Service Deployment Ribbon with 4 bronze Campaign stars
9th row	NATO Medal for Ex-Yugoslavia	Marksmanship Medal for Rifle Expert	Marksmanship Medal for Pistol Expert
Badge	Navy and Marine Corps Parachutist Insignia		
Badge	U.S. Navy Command at Sea insignia		
Badge	Presidential Service Badge		

== Personal life ==
Davids and his wife, Vice Admiral Yvette M. Davids, have twin sons, Kai and Kiernan Davids.

Military offices
Preceded by Antonio Fletcher	Commander of Special Operations Command South; 2020–2022	Succeeded by Peter D. Huntley
Preceded by Hugh W. Howard III	Commander of Naval Special Warfare Command; 2022–2024	Succeeded by Milton Sands III
