= WHCA =

WHCA may refer to:

- White House Communications Agency
- White House Correspondents' Association
