= Warren Gulley =

- Gulley in 1985
- Born: November 16, 1922
- Died: February 24, 2012 (aged 89); California
- Military career
- Allegiance: United States
- Branch: United States Marine Corps
- Service years: 1939–1968
- Rank: Sergeant major
- Nickname: Bill
- Unit: 1st Marine Division
- Wars: World War II; Korean War
- Awards: Presidential Unit Citation Purple Heart
- Other work: White House Military Office (1968–1977); The International Six

Signature
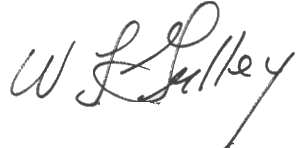

Warren "Bill" Gulley (November 16, 1922 – February 24, 2012) was an American military non-commissioned officer (NCO) who, in retirement, served (1968–1977) as the first civilian chief of the White House Military Office. In that position he amassed substantial political influence and established a sometimes feared reputation.

Gulley later went into private business with Gen. Brent Scowcroft and others. In 1980 he wrote an exposé on misdeeds and embezzlement he'd witnessed during his career, Breaking Cover.

== Biography ==
=== Youth and military service ===
Gulley was raised in Illinois and joined the United States Marine Corps in 1939, just before his eighteenth birthday. He served in the Pacific theater during World War II and was wounded at the Battle of Guadalcanal. He also saw action during the Korean War. In 1966 Gulley was assigned to the White House Military Office and, two years later, retired from the Marine Corps at the rank of sergeant major, which coincided with his appointment as chief of the office by Lyndon Johnson.

=== White House Military Office ===
Gulley had been recommended to his new post by Brent Scowcroft. He was the first civilian to hold the position of chief of the military office; to make it appear the president's staff was smaller than it was, Gulley was placed on the United States Postal Service payroll. He spent the next 11 years in charge of the White House Military Office, which was then responsible for the nuclear football, Air Force One, Marine One, the White House Communications Agency, and the White House Mess.

According to Col. Stephen Bauer, who worked in the White House during Gulley's tenure, Gulley had a reputation as the "big, bad wolf" and wielded such influence that no one below sub-Cabinet rank dared question his decisions, though many people resented a former NCO having virtually unchecked power. Bauer claims that, during the Richard Nixon presidency, Gulley was the second "most feared member of the staff" after H. R. Haldeman.

By 1975 Gulley was also serving in a de facto capacity as the president's liaison with former presidents of the United States after the post of special assistant for liaison with former presidents had gone unfilled following the retirement of the former special assistant, Gen. Robert Schulz.

Gulley retired in 1977. Then President Jimmy Carter was informed of Gulley's departure by special assistant for administration Hugh Carter, who noted that "I regret losing Bill because he did an excellent job".

=== International Six ===
After retirement, Gulley went into business with Brent Scowcroft, Marvin Watson, Jack Brennan, Omar Zawawi (the brother of the Omani foreign minister), and former Lyndon Johnson aide Haywood Smith. The six men were partners in a company they named the International Six, Inc. (ISI). According to a Washington Post article from the time period, "the nature of their business, investing or consulting is not something they choose to discuss".

Gulley and Scowcroft had originally been introduced to Zawawi by Richard Nixon. ISI specialized in facilitating business deals in the United States with Omani and Iraqi concerns. It shut-down in 1988 after Scowcroft accepted appointment as National Security Advisor to Ronald Reagan. According to Gulley, the business realized only marginal profit during its existence.

== Breaking Cover ==
In 1980, Simon & Schuster published Gulley's book, Breaking Cover, which detailed "the questionable or illegal practices of his superiors" during his years at the White House. Among Gulley's allegations was that vast sums of "black budget" money earmarked to build emergency bunkers for the president of the United States had been diverted to finance improvements to the personal property of Lyndon Johnson, including the installation of swimming pools and movie theaters; that the United States Secret Service was the "worst, most inefficient, badly run, highly political outfit in the United States government"; and that Lyndon Johnson had given several of his mistresses clerical jobs in the U.S. government.

Gulley was one of two former White House staff to report that Jimmy Carter refused to allow the military aide responsible for the nuclear football to stay at a trailer adjacent to his house in Plains, Georgia, when Carter was in residence there, charges which Carter later denied. He also alleged that Richard Nixon had taken a "behind the scenes" role in Gerald Ford's 1976 presidential campaign, and that Nixon had once described the position of United States Secretary of the Navy as "a job anyone can do ... why we even had John Warner in that job".

Breaking Cover's details about the nuclear football are some of the best known source material on the device publicly available and have frequently been used as a reference in mainstream media over the 35 years since publication, being cited by UPI in 1983, USA Today in 2005, Business Insider in 2015, and CNN in 2016, among others.

== Personal life ==
Warren Gulley was married to Nancy Gulley (Redmond) and had four children; Michael, Patrick, John, and Timothy. Gulley had related to friends and family that in his early life had no real education, and "learned to read" in the Marine Corps, though this statement is taken to mean by members of his family that he read more fluently. Gulley also claimed that he received a high school diploma while in the United States Marine Corps through correspondence courses. Prior to his enlistment, Gulley hunted and trapped animals for money, and later became a local delivery driver for a short period of time, which according to him, he did at the age of 14 by requesting a driver's license by mail.

There is some controversy over his enlistment dates, as he enlisted into the United States Marine Corps before his 18th birthday, by some accounts, while he was only 16 years of age. This was corrected at the time of his retirement, or so Gulley would later relate.

Gulley also had a reputation in the United States Marine Corps of being a competent gambler and card player.
