= Presidential Service Badge =

- Presidential Service Badge
- Type: Service badge
- Awarded for: Service in support of the president of the United States
- Presented by: United States
- Related: White House Service Badge (obsolete)

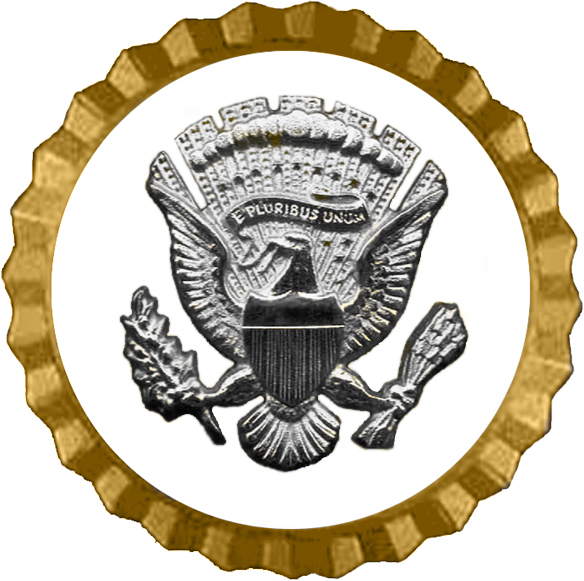
Former White House Service Badge

The Presidential Service Badge (PSB) is an identification badge awarded by the president of the United States to members of the uniformed services of the United States. It was established on June 1, 1960, by Executive Order 10879, signed by United States president Dwight D. Eisenhower.

== Overview ==
Executive Order 10879 of June 1, 1960 was signed by President Dwight D. Eisenhower establishing a White House Service Badge. President Lyndon B. Johnson retired the White House Service Badge and issued a separate Presidential Service Badge by signing Executive Order 11174 on September 1, 1964.

Typical recipients include:

- Military aides to the president appointed from each of the services (pay grade O-4 or O-5) who, among other duties, rotate being the so-called "Emergency War Officer" with "The Football", a briefcase containing nuclear decision-making tools kept within ready access of the president at all times,
- The White House Naval Mess Facility (Presidential Food Service) located in the West Wing of the White House and the OEOB,
- White House military public affairs officers,
- Servicemembers assigned to the White House Communications Agency (WHCA), which supports presidential communications worldwide,
- Servicemembers assigned to the White House Transportation Agency (WHTA), which provides motor vehicle transportation to the White House as directed by the White House Military Office,
- Servicemembers assigned to the White House Medical Unit (WHMU) which provides medical support to the president and vice president, their families, and the White House staff,
- "Air Force One" airmen assigned to the Presidential Airlift Group (PAG) of the 89th Airlift Wing at Andrews AFB, Maryland,
- Naval personnel assigned to Camp David (Naval Support Facility Thurmont),
- Marine Helicopter Squadron 1 (HMX-1) "Marine One" flight crew,
- Marines assigned to the Marine Security Company at Camp David,
- White House Marine sentries.

The PSB is awarded "to any member of the Armed Forces assigned to duty in the White House Office or to military units and support facilities under the administration of the Military Assistant to the President by the Secretary of the Army, the Secretary of the Navy, the Secretary of the Air Force, or, when the Coast Guard is not operating as a service in the Navy, the Secretary of Homeland Security, upon recommendation of the Military Assistant to the President". It is accompanied by a certificate and miniature lapel version. The PSB is recorded in the individual's military service records and is authorized for wear as a permanent decoration.

Recipients are, other than the president and uniformed members of the U.S. Secret Service, the only Americans authorized to wear the "Presidential Seal or Coat of Arms" on their uniforms and civilian clothes. Since 1964, with the enactment of Executive Order 11174, over 20,000 U.S. armed services members and veterans have received the Presidential Service Badge for honorable service in the White House.

A similar badge, the Vice Presidential Service Badge, exists for military personnel assigned to assist the vice president of the United States.

== Presidential Service Association ==
The Presidential Service Association is a non-profit organization for United States armed services personnel and veterans who have received the Presidential Service Badge by serving in the White House in Washington, D.C., United States. The organization was created to provide a network of personnel, to construct a history of their service and to demonstrate the traditions and pride of that service. It furnishes scholarships, grants or crisis funds for United States armed services personnel and veterans who served in the White House prior to or after the creation of the White House Service Certificate, the Presidential Service Badge/Certificate or the Vice Presidential Service Certificate/Badge. President Dwight D. Eisenhower called the decoration a symbol of "deserved honor and distinction." Each recipient has their name linked to a serial number held at the White House.

== Presidential Service Center ==
The Presidential Service Center is a non-profit organization celebrating civilian aides and employees of the United States presidency, and armed services personnel lawfully awarded a serial-numbered Presidential Service Badge by serving the White House and White House Military Office. It is jointly located with the Presidential Culinary Museum. The center displays glass case exhibits of the history of service, machines with facilities maintained and historical remembrances. It contains numerous artifacts, antiques, and items sent by the National Archives and presidential foundations supporting it. The center and museum have been featured in over 130 newspapers, worldwide, as well as on CNN International and PBS television. The center contains numerous Presidential Service Badges on display and one of the largest on public display. It is located in Grover, North Carolina, a town named after President of the United States Grover Cleveland.

== See also ==
- Vice Presidential Service Badge
- Identification badges of the uniformed services of the United States
- Military badges of the United States
- Yankee White
