= Gold Codes =

Nuclear weapon launch codes for the US president

The Gold Code is the launch code for nuclear weapons provided to the president of the United States in their role as commander-in-chief of the armed forces. In conjunction with the nuclear football, the Gold Codes allow the president to authorize a nuclear attack. Gold Codes, as well as a separate nuclear football, are also assigned to the vice president in case the president is incapacitated or otherwise unable to discharge the duties of office pursuant to the Twenty-fifth Amendment to the United States Constitution.

== Physical description ==
Gold Codes are arranged in a column and printed on a plastic card nicknamed "the biscuit". The card's size is similar to that of a credit card, and the president is supposed to carry it on their person. Before it can be read, an opaque plastic covering must be snapped in two and removed.

Gold Codes are generated daily and provided by the National Security Agency (NSA) to the White House, The Pentagon, United States Strategic Command and TACAMO. The concept behind the codes is that they permit the president to present positive identification of being the commander-in-chief and thereby authenticate a launch order to the National Military Command Center (NMCC).

== Protocol ==
If the president decides to launch nuclear weapons, they would be taken aside by the carrier of the nuclear football and the briefcase would be opened. The president would select from among sets of specific orders for attacks on specific targets. The attack options are preset war plans developed under OPLAN 8010, and include major attack options, selected attack options, and limited attack options. The chosen attack option and the Gold Codes would be transmitted to the NMCC via a special secure channel. Before the order can be followed by the military, the president must be identified using a special code issued on a plastic card, nicknamed "the biscuit". The authentication is conducted between the president and the NMCC's deputy director of operations, using a challenge code of two phonetic letters. The president will read from the biscuit the daily phonetic letters and the deputy director will confirm or deny if they are correct, confirming that the person is the president and the attack orders can be given. As commander-in-chief, the president is the only person with the authority to order the use of nuclear weapons. Nuclear-defense policy expert Franklin Miller argues that the president has almost singular authority to initiate a nuclear attack; while the secretary of defense is required to verify the order, they cannot veto it. Daniel Ellsberg argued that in practice, this authority has been delegated by the president to a number of military officers.

== See also ==
- List of government and military acronyms
- List of established military terms
- Emergency Action Message
- Multi-factor authentication
- National Command Authority (United States)
- Nuclear weapon control in the United Kingdom
- Operation Looking Glass
- Roger Fisher (academic), who proposed putting the nuclear codes inside a person so that the president has no choice but to take a life to activate the nuclear weapons
