= White House Service Badge =

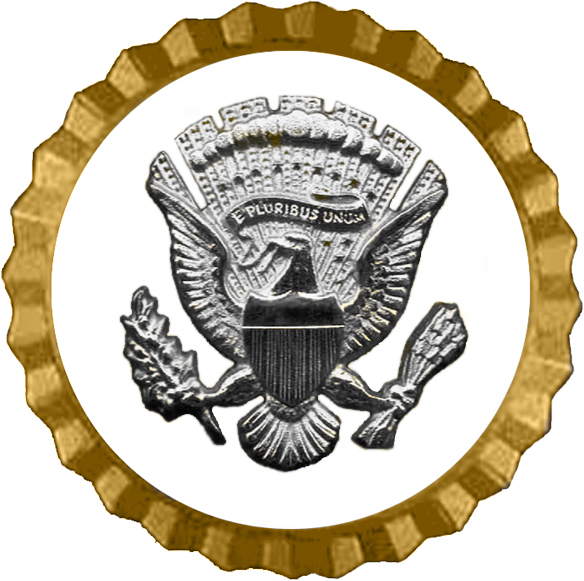
- White House Service Badge
- Type: Service badge
- Awarded for: Military service performed while assigned to White House military postings
- Presented by: United States

The White House Service Badge was a short-lived military insignia which was issued between the years of 1960 and 1964 for United States Armed Forces military personnel stationed at the White House in a variety of duties. Issued to any member of the Armed Forces detailed to duty in the White House, other than the presidential aides. The badge was worn as a part of the uniform of those individuals, during the period of their detail to White House duty, under such regulations as the secretaries of the Army, Navy, and Air Force, with the approval of the secretary of defense. It was not a permanent award. A corresponding White House Service Certificate was awarded in the name of the president of the United States by the secretary of the Army, the secretary of the Navy, or the secretary of the Air Force, upon recommendation of the presidential military, Naval, or Air Force Aide. The certificate could be granted posthumously.

Executive Order 10879 of June 1, 1960 authorized the creation of a White House Service Badge with further military regulations stating that the badge may be entered into permanent military service records upon completion of a White House tour of duty. President Lyndon B. Johnson retired the White House Service Badge just after four years, and created a separate Presidential Service Badge (with different award criteria) by signing Executive Order 11174.

== Source ==
- History of Presidential Service Badges
