= Richard Trefry =

United States Army general (1924–2023)

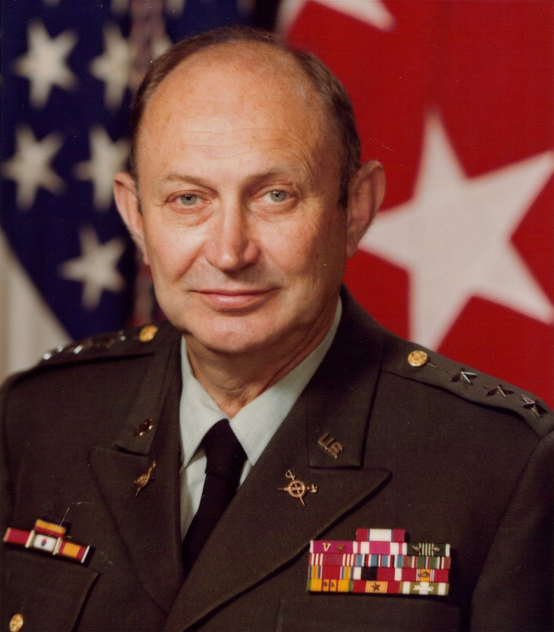
- Born: August 6, 1924; Newburyport, Massachusetts, U.S.
- Died: February 25, 2023 (aged 98); Fairfax, Virginia, U.S.
- Burial place: Arlington National Cemetery
- Military career
- Allegiance: United States
- Branch: United States Army
- Service years: 1943–1946; 1950–1983
- Rank: Lieutenant general
- Conflicts: Vietnam War; 1973 Laotian coup d'état attempt

Richard Greenleaf Trefry (August 6, 1924 – February 25, 2023) was a lieutenant general in the United States Army. His last assignment was Inspector General of the Army.

== Military career ==
Trefry began his Army career as an enlisted soldier and served in World War II before attending the U.S. Military Academy at West Point, New York where he received a commission in 1950 as a field artillery officer. His first assignment was with the 70th Field Artillery Battalion, in Germany, serving as a Reconnaissance and Survey Officer. After his tour of duty, he returned to the United States and was assigned the artillery school at Fort Sill, Oklahoma, where he was promoted to captain and instructed artillery tactics. Noted for his teaching abilities, he was subsequently assigned as an instructor at the Engineer School at Fort Belvoir, Virginia.

In 1958 Trefry reported to Korea and assumed command of an artillery battery of the 1st Battalion, 31st Artillery. He subsequently was assigned to instructor duty at West Point followed by a tour of duty at Schofield Barracks where he served in the Headquarters of the US Army in Hawaii. In 1966, Lieutenant Colonel Trefry returned to Fort Sill where he assumed command of the 2nd Battalion, 94th Field Artillery and then deployed that battalion to Vietnam.

After attending the U.S. Army War College, Trefry assumed command of the Division Artillery, 1st Armored Division, Fort Hood, Texas and then became the chief of staff, 1st Cavalry Division.

In 1973 he was posted to Bangkok, Thailand, to be the deputy chief of the Joint U.S. Military Advisory Group. He was then assigned as the defense attaché in Vientiane, Laos, where he contributed to the defeat of a coup d’état by exiled Laotian air force officers. While in Thailand, Trefry was promoted to brigadier general.

Upon his return from southeast Asia, Trefry was assigned to the Army Staff in the Pentagon, where he served in multiple positions culminating with his assignment as the Inspector General of the Army in 1977. Promoted to lieutenant general in 1978, he spent six years as the inspector general reporting to the Army Chief of Staff and the Secretary of the Army on all matters pertaining to the efficiency, economy, morale, discipline, and esprit of the Army.

Trefry retired from the Army in 1983.

== Post-retirement ==
In 1990, he was appointed military assistant to the president and director of the White House Military Office. In 1995, Trefry served on the Board of Directors of American Military University and later served on the board of trustees of the American Public University System as a member and committee chair.

Trefry died on February 25, 2023, at the age of 98.
