= Maju Varghese =

American attorney and political advisor (born 1978)

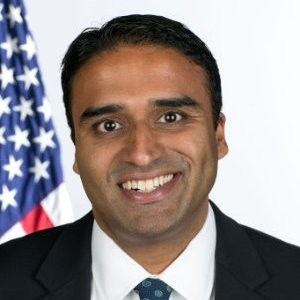

Director of the White House Military Office
- In office March 9, 2021 – January 21, 2022
- President: Joe Biden
- Preceded by: Keith Davids
- Succeeded by: TBD

Director of the White House Office of Management and Administration
- In office July 2015 – January 20, 2017
- President: Barack Obama
- Preceded by: Katy Kale
- Succeeded by: Marcia L. Kelly

Personal details
- Born: February 21, 1978 (age 48) New York City, New York, U.S.
- Education: University of Massachusetts, Amherst (BA); Hofstra University (JD)

Maju Varghese (born February 21, 1978) is an American attorney and political advisor who served as director of the White House Military Office in the Biden administration. He assumed office on March 9, 2021 and left office January 21, 2022.

== Early life and education ==
Varghese was born in New York City and raised in Elmont, the son of parents who immigrated from Kerala, India. Varghese's mother worked as a nurse while his father was a cab driver in New York City. After graduating from Elmont Memorial Junior – Senior High School, Varghese earned a Bachelor of Arts degree in political science and economics from the University of Massachusetts Amherst and a Juris Doctor from the Maurice A. Deane School of Law of Hofstra University.

== Career ==
In 1999 and 2000, Varghese worked on the advance team for the Al Gore 2000 presidential campaign. He then worked as a research associate for the Democratic National Committee. From 2006 to 2010, he was a legal associate at Wade Clark Mulcahy LLP in New York City, where he specialized in civil litigation, construction accidents, and property damage claims.

=== Obama Administration ===
In 2010, Varghese joined the White House Office, serving as advance lead, special assistant to President Barack Obama and director of advance, and assistant to the president for management and administration.

In 2017 and 2018, Varghese was a senior advisor at Dentons. He was then the COO of The Hub Project, a left-wing advocacy and research firm that provides campaign services to progressive political candidates. From September 2019 to November 2020, Varghese was a senior advisor and the COO of the Joe Biden 2020 presidential campaign.

=== Biden Administration ===
Varghese acted as the executive director of the 59th Presidential Inaugural Committee and was later appointed as director of the White House Military Office in the Biden administration. Varghese ended his term as WHMO Director on January 21, 2022.

Later, Varghese joined the National Endowment for Democracy as the chief operating officer on February 7, 2022. Varghese then became a principal at NEWCO Strategies.

Political offices
Preceded by Katy Kale	Director of the White House Office of Management and Administration; 2015–2017	Succeeded by Marcia L. Kelly
Preceded by Keith Davids	Director of the White House Military Office; February 2021–January 21, 2022	Succeeded by TBD
