= White House social aide =

US Military officer

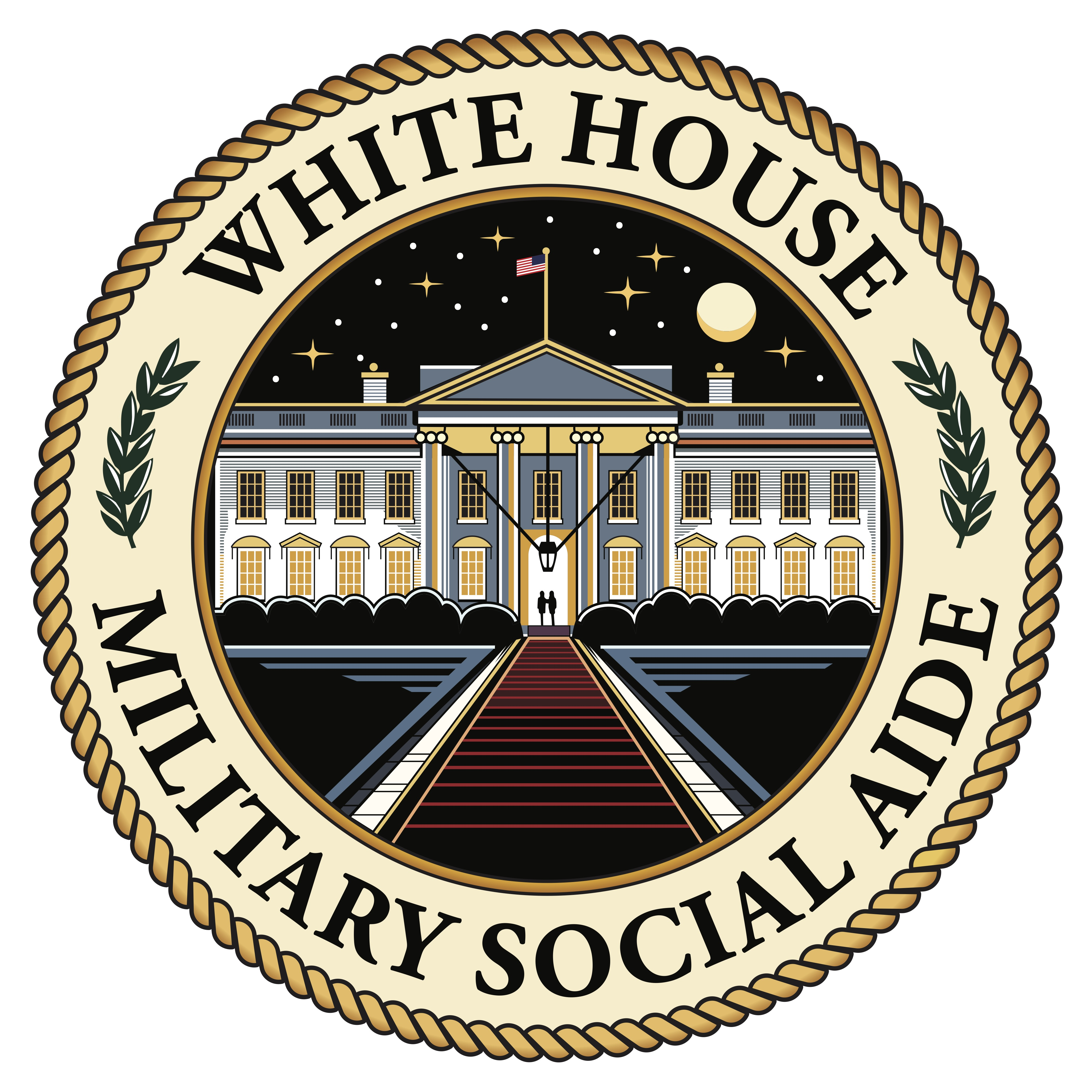
- White House social aide logo

Occupation
- Occupation type: Military
- Activity sectors: Public sector

Description
- Competencies: Military commission, Single marital status, Impeccable appearance
- Related jobs: Protocol (diplomacy)

A White House social aide is a United States Armed Forces officer assigned to attend to the personal needs of visiting dignitaries at the White House and to facilitate interactions with the president of the United States and the first lady of the United States. White House social aides were first appointed in 1902; as of 2024, there were 80 such officers.

== History ==
White House social aides assist during the 2016 Public Safety Officer Medal of Valor presentation

The first White House social aides were appointed in 1902 during the presidency of Theodore Roosevelt. Until 1969 only men were permitted to serve as social aides; in that year, Richard Nixon approved the appointment of female social aides. As of 2014, there were 45 social aides. Social aides have been drawn from the United States Army, United States Navy, United States Air Force, United States Marine Corps, United States Coast Guard, and the National Guard of the United States.

== Duties ==
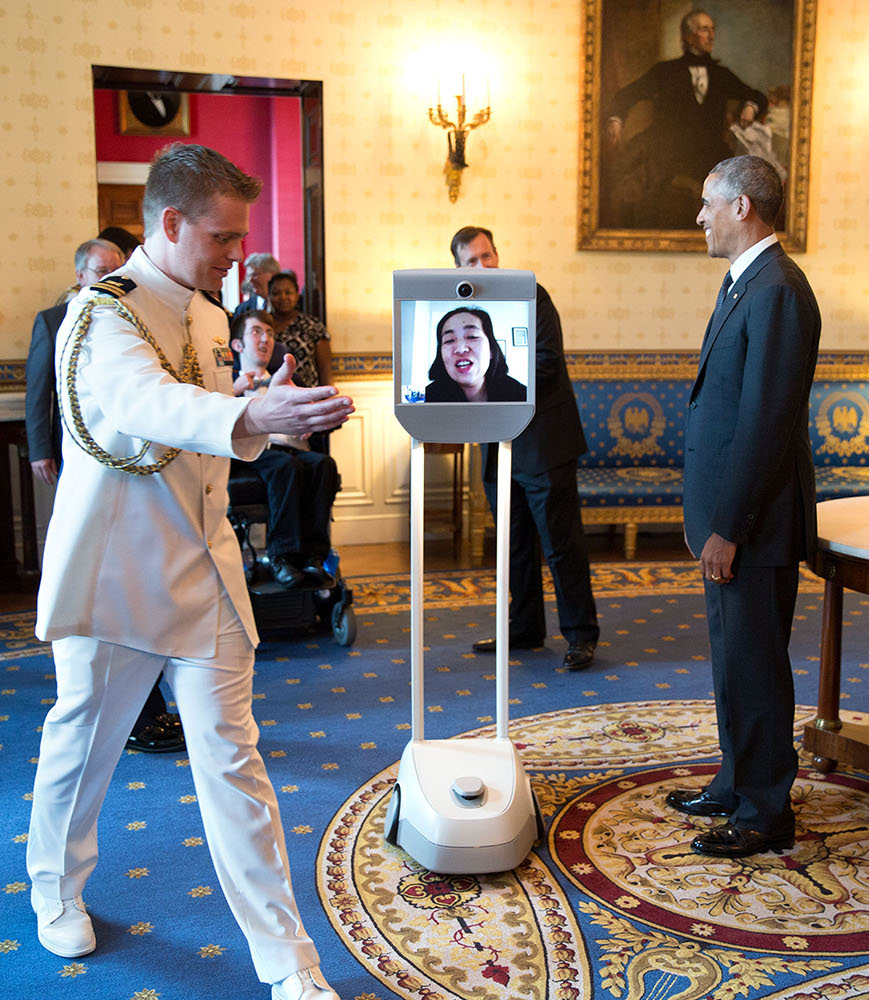
A "pulling off aide" leads Alice Wong, a disabled woman who appeared before then President Barack Obama via robot, away during a receiving line.

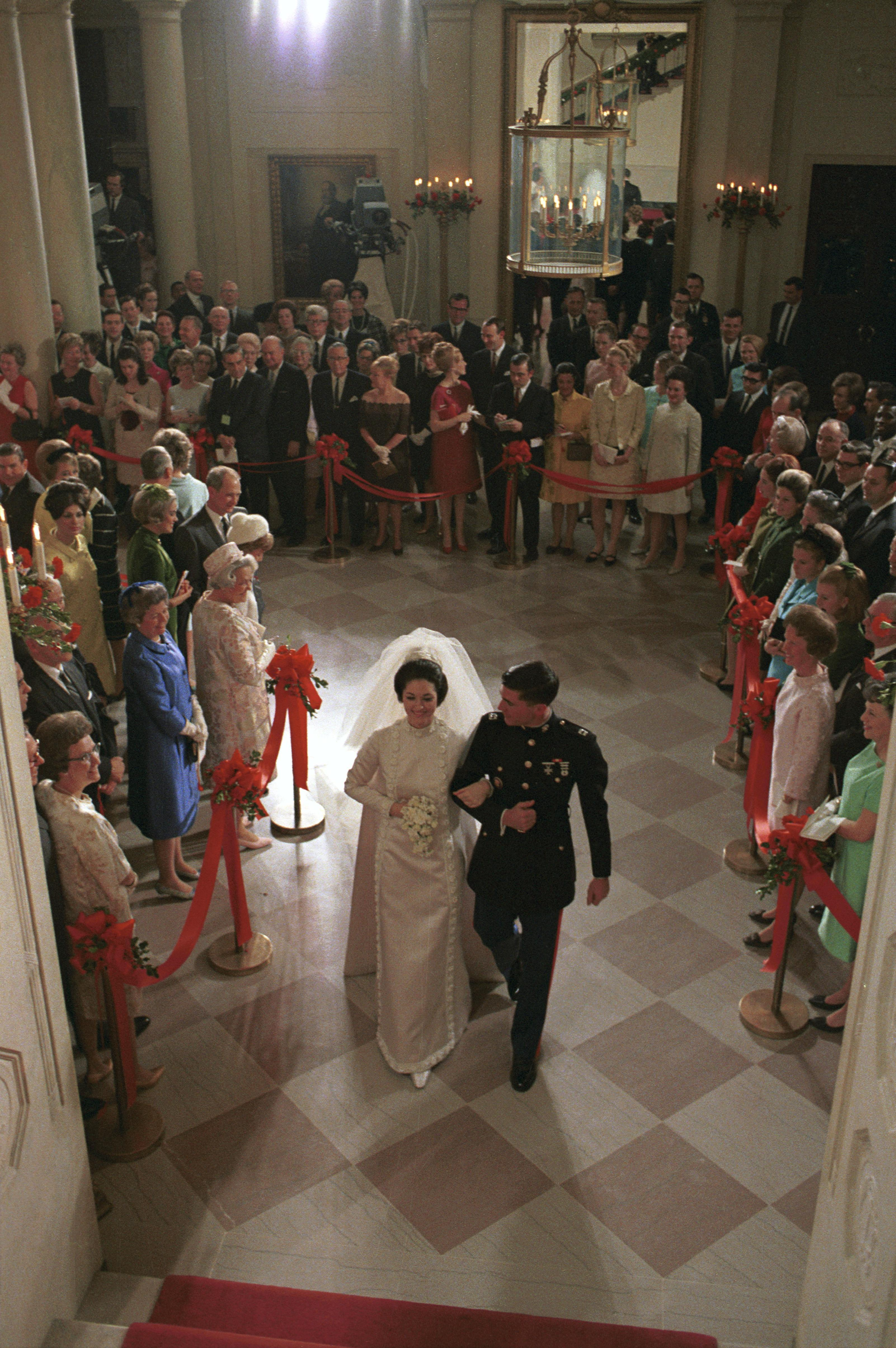
White House social aide Captain Charles Robb is married to Lynda Bird Johnson, daughter of then-President Lyndon Johnson, in 1967

White House social aides report to a coordinator in the office of the White House Social Secretary. Their duties include managing "guests who attend social functions at the White House, [facilitating] interactions with the president and first lady and [escorting] dignitaries". In the past, this has included entertaining single guests, such as providing dance companions; initiating small talk with lonely guests during teas; directing the flow of traffic at receiving lines; and greeting visitors.

When visitors are received by the President of the United States, three social aides are assigned to coordinate the interaction: the "whispering aide" who whispers the visitor's name to the president, the "introducing aide" who presents the visitor to the president, and the "pulling off aide" who encourages the visitor to step away once the president signals the interaction has concluded.

Social aides are also expected to identify and resolve social miscues; during one visit by King Hussein of Jordan to the White House during the presidency of Ronald Reagan, a reporter attempted to cut in on the king to ask him questions during social dancing. According to The New York Times, a social aide "came to the rescue by cutting in and deftly waltzing the young woman off the dance floor".

== Selection ==
White House social aides must be commissioned officers with a rank no higher than major (or lieutenant commander in the Navy or Coast Guard), be assigned to Washington, D.C., and have "impeccable appearance".

According to a statement provided to The New York Times, the past restriction on married social aides was due to the significant evening demands placed on aides that might interfere with their marital relationship. However, Stephen Bauer – who served as a social aide – has written that the prohibition on wedded aides is to prevent a scandal developing in the event a social aide is invited into a romantic relationship with a guest. This is no longer a requirement as of early 2021.

Because social aides have direct access to the President of the United States, prospective aides must successfully pass a Yankee White review demonstrating their "unquestionable loyalty to the United States".

== The Seal of the White House Military Social Aide ==
Central to The Seal of the White House Military Social Aide Program is the portrayal of the White House at night, illustrating the commitment of a Military Social Aide has duties that extend well beyond conventional working hours. The red carpet at the White House entrance signifies the path of honor and respect afforded to visitors, mirroring the Aides' dedication to delivering hospitality at every event they oversee.

Encircling the White House are six stars, each one representing one of the six branches of the U.S. Armed Services. This arrangement showcases the scope of military representation within the program. Above, the full moon shines, as an emblem of constancy and also reflecting the social aides' pivotal role in guiding events towards triumphant fruition.

Around this imagery are olive branches, each with 13 leaves, a nod to the original 13 states. This design element pays homage to the historical roots of both the program and the nation, underscoring the peaceful and diplomatic essence of the Social Aides' duties. Encircling the seal, the braided border is a direct representation of the distinctive aiguillette worn by each Social Aide, a mark of their distinguished service and dedication.

The seal was designed by Lieutenant Jasper Burns, USN (WHSA ‘23-'24) and officially incorporated into the program in 2023.

== Notable social aides ==
- As daughter of President of the United States Lyndon Johnson, Lynda Bird Johnson was given "pick of the litter" of White House social aides and ultimately selected Marine Captain Charles Robb as her personal escort. She later wed Robb in 1967 in a White House ceremony; Robb would ultimately become the 64th Governor of Virginia.
- Gerald F. "Gerry" Richman, a corporate lawyer and formerly president of Richman-Greer, a South Florida law firm, was a White House social aide during the Johnson administration. Richman is rumored to have had the opportunity to escort Lynda Bird Johnson, but passed on it to Robb because Richman already had a conflicting date with a Miss Universe contestant.
- Brian Lamb, later chief executive officer of C-SPAN, was a White House social aide during the Johnson administration; among his duties were escorting Lady Bird Johnson during the wedding of Lynda Bird Johnson and Robb.
- Abelardo L. Valdez, assistant administrator of the United States Agency for International Development, served as a social aide during the presidency of Lyndon Johnson.
- Major General Marcelite J. Harris was a White House social aide during the presidency of Jimmy Carter.
- Vice Admiral Jody A. Breckenridge was a White House social aide.
- In 2015, Captain John Fesler became the first social aide appointed from the Air National Guard.
- Stephen Kappes as a Marine officer served as a social aide to President Carter and later became the deputy director of the Central Intelligence Agency

== The Society of White House Military Aides ==
The Society of White House Military Aides grew from an idea of camaraderie and friendship shared through their unique experiences while serving their nation’s presidents. It is their purpose to continue to renew those friendships through the society and preserve the history and honor of their service. Their members represent military aides from twelve administrations, comprising both current and past White House social and presidential aides from the Roosevelt Administration to that of George W. Bush, and five branches of the service: the Army, Navy, Air Force, Marines and the Coast Guard. Honorary members include social secretaries to the President and those members of the White House Military Office who worked directly with military aides.

Since its founding in 1991 by Chairman Kenn Riordan, Jr. (Reagan), the society has grown from fifty aides to over 600 aides and has been incorporated with legal counsel. The two most senior members served as aides to President Roosevelt; another, White House Curator, Mr. Rex Scouten, served ten presidents. Included in their ranks are two presidents of the American Red Cross; members of the Council of Foreign Relations; a chairman of the Joint Chiefs of Staff; a CINCPAC; two women who retired as the highest ranking in their services; a U.S. senator; the founder of C-SPAN; a founding partner of the Carlyle Group; three university presidents; and a CEO of PepsiCo. All were White House social or presidential aides, and members.

== Gallery ==
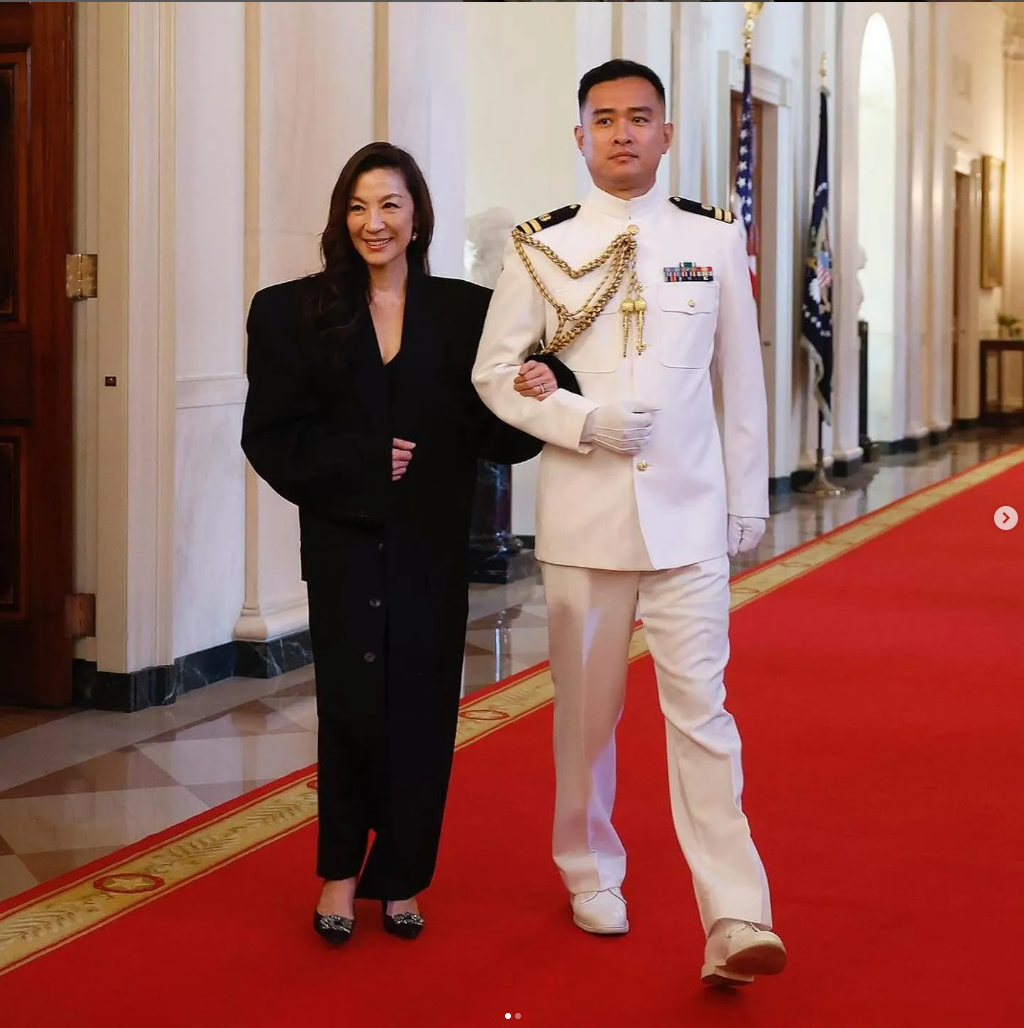
A Navy JAG, serving as White House social aide, escorts actor Michelle Yeoh to receive her medal of freedom at the White House in 2023.

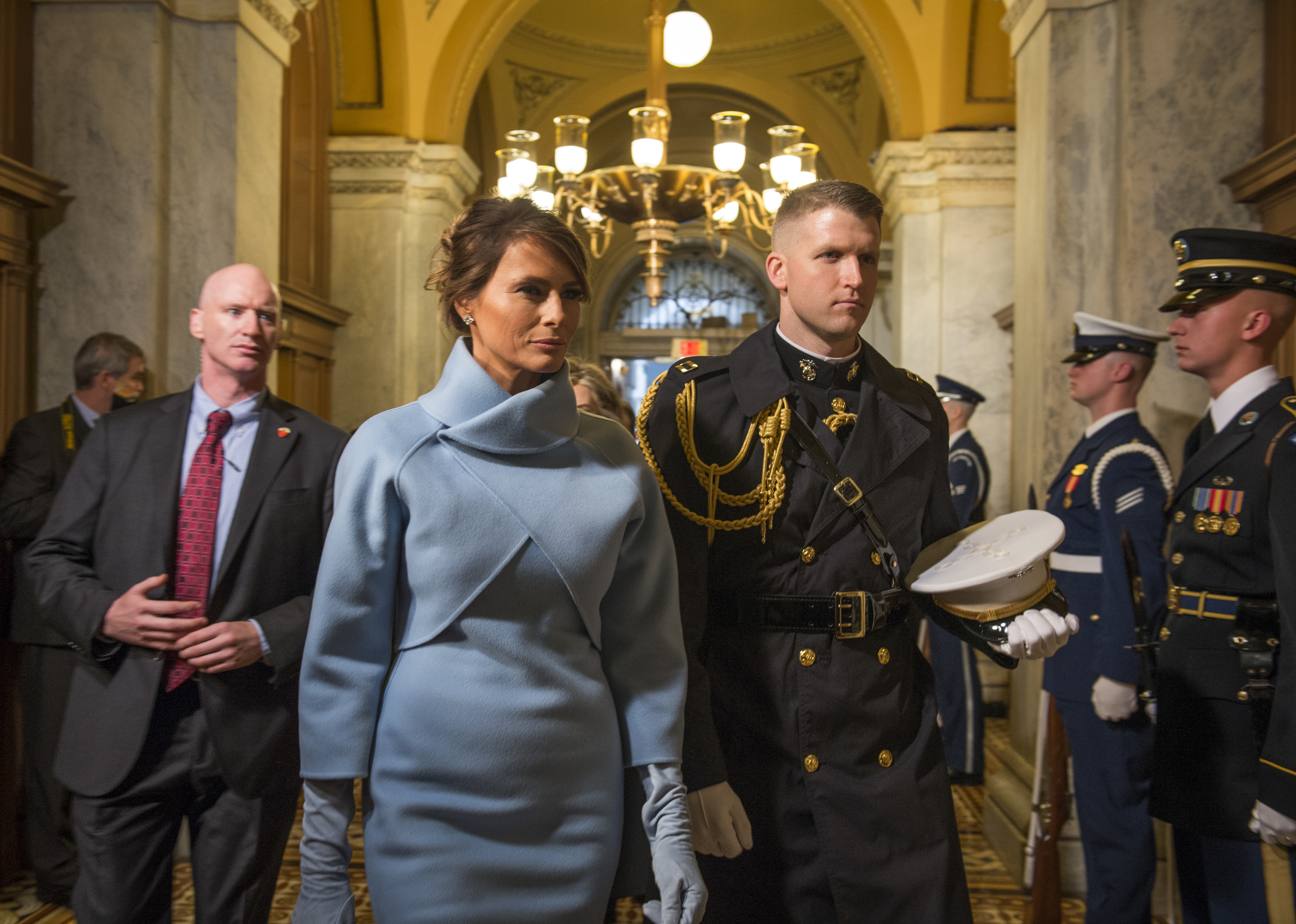
Melania Trump is escorted by a White House social aide at the United States Capitol in 2017

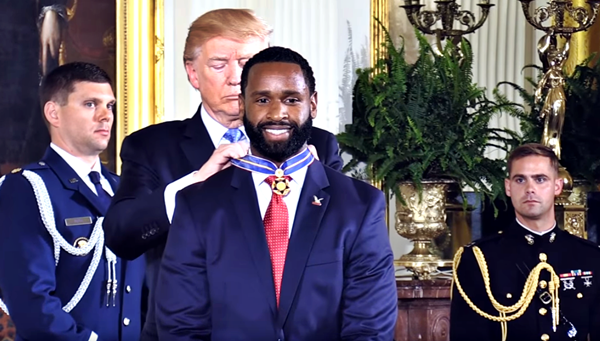
Two White House social aides attend President Donald Trump as he awards the Public Safety Officer Medal of Valor in 2017

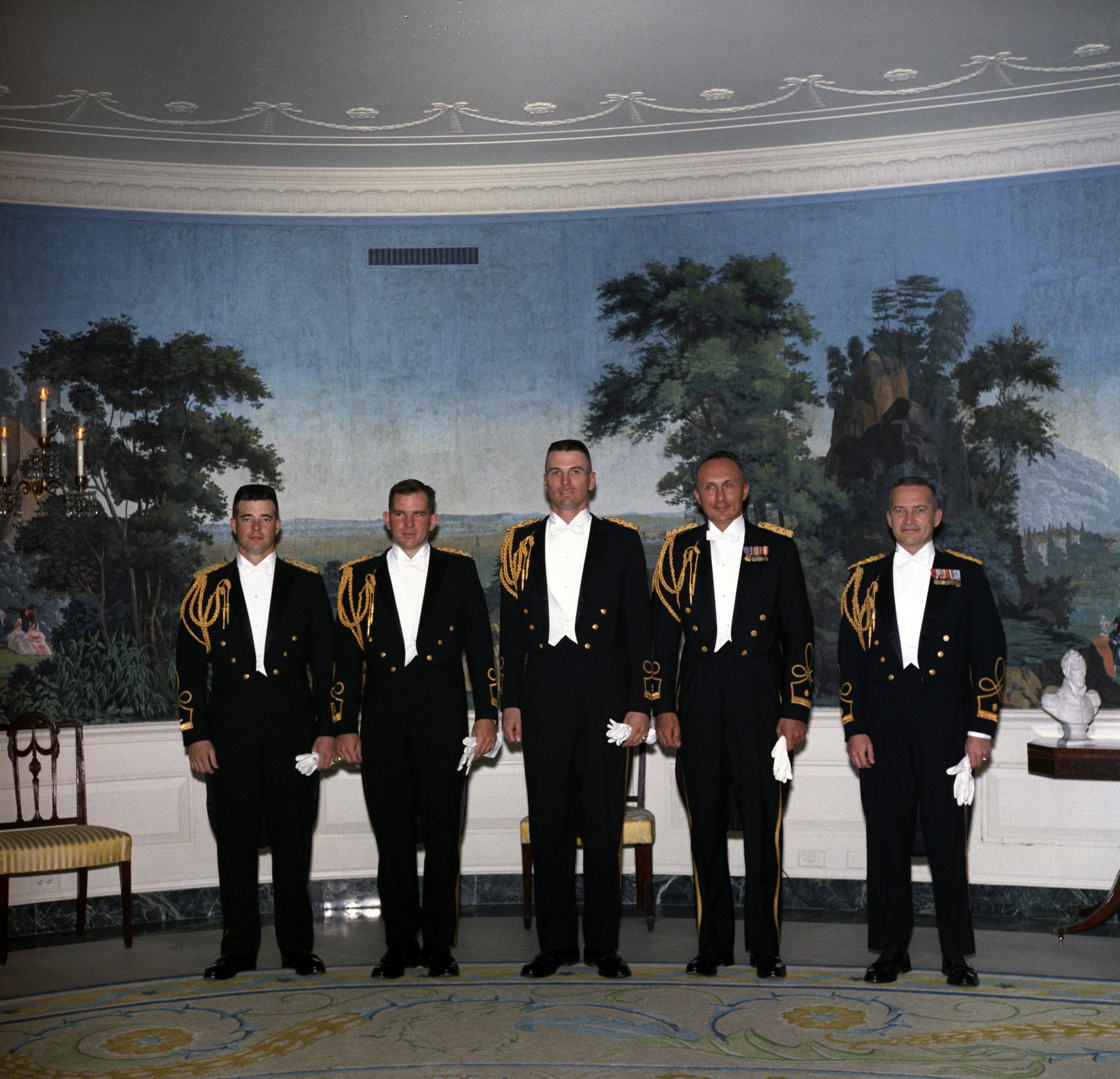
White House social aides pictured during the presidency of John Kennedy in the Diplomatic Reception Room

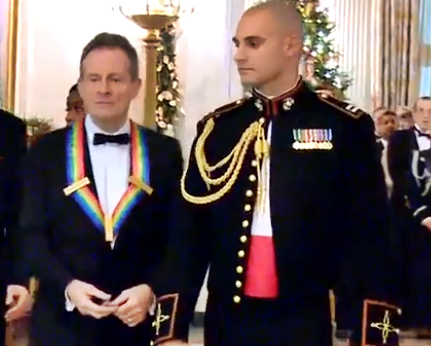
A White House social aide leads Led Zeppelin's John Paul Jones to the Kennedy Center Honors ceremony in 2012

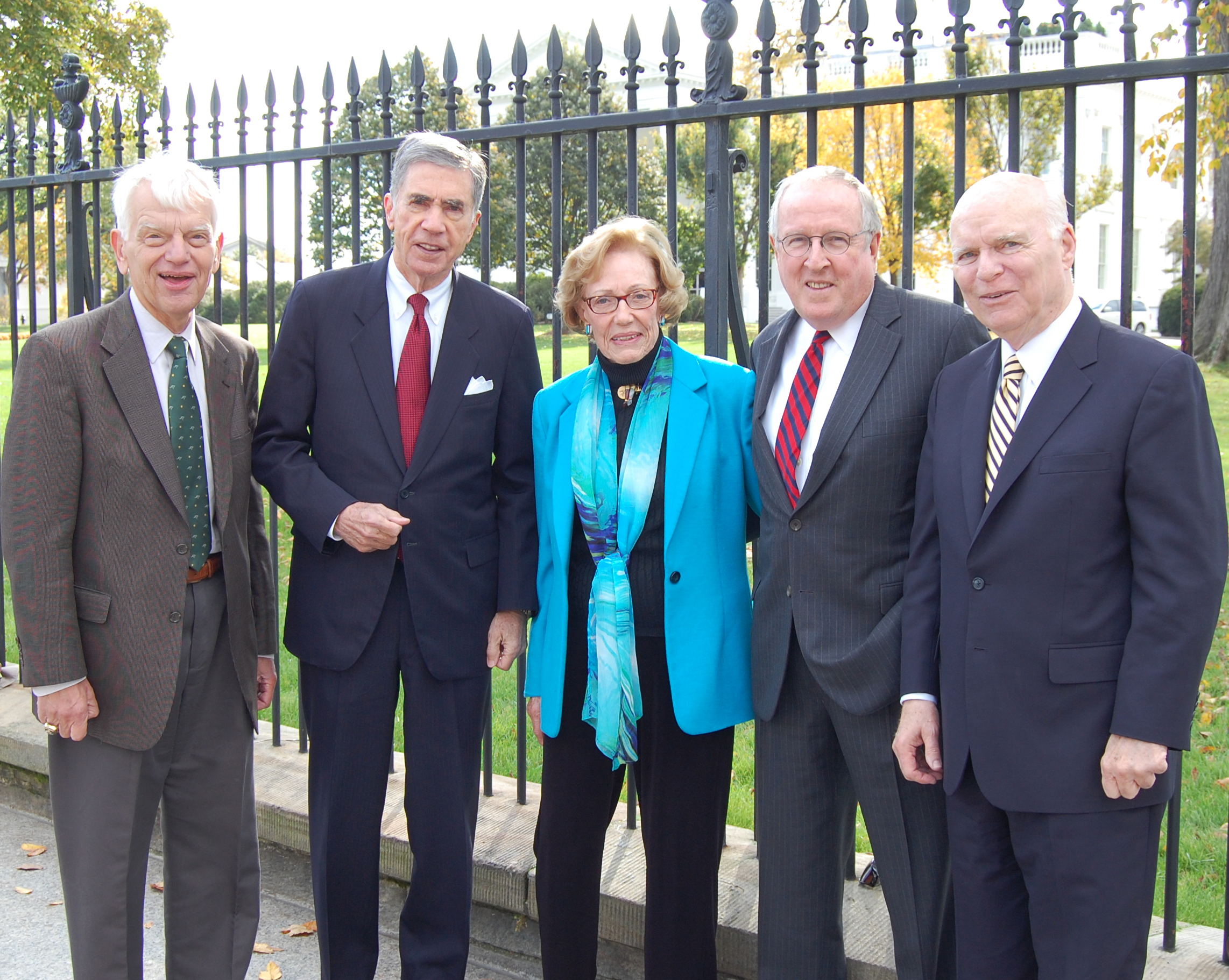
Johnson Military Aides with Social Secretary Bess Abell (L-R) Dr. Alan Merten (George Mason Univ.), Governor (and Senator) Chuck Robb, Bess Abell, Edward J. Mathias (Carlyle Group), Brian Lamb (C-SPAN)

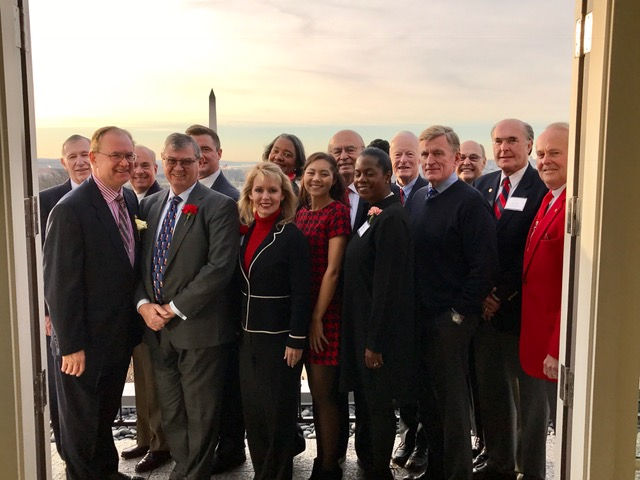
Board of Advisors, Society of White House Military Aides, overlooking the White House and Washington Monument

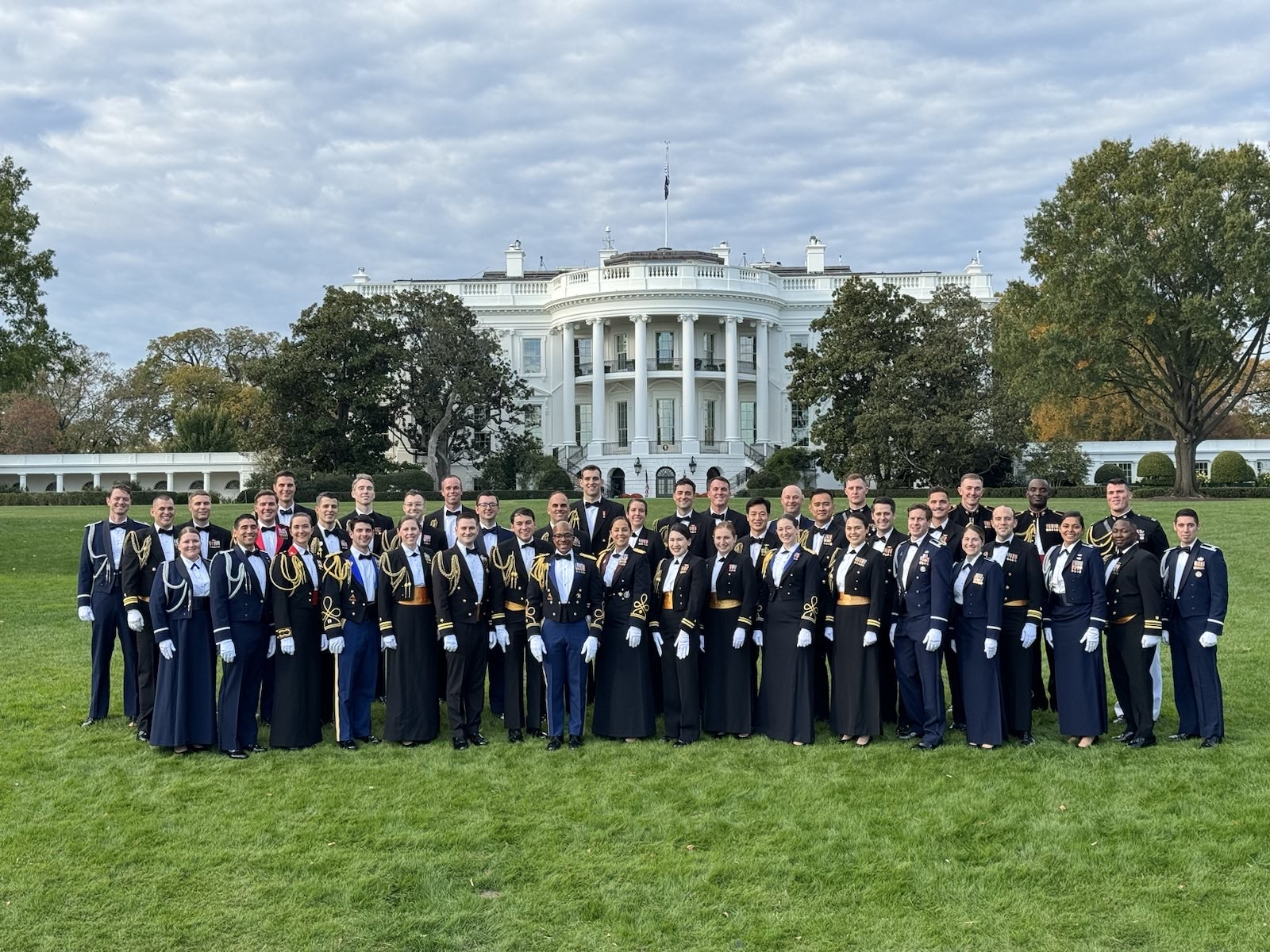
The complement of White House social aides supporting the 2023 state dinner with Australia.

== See also ==
- Aide-de-camp
- Body man
