= Air Force One photo op incident =

2009 New York Bay VC-25 flyby

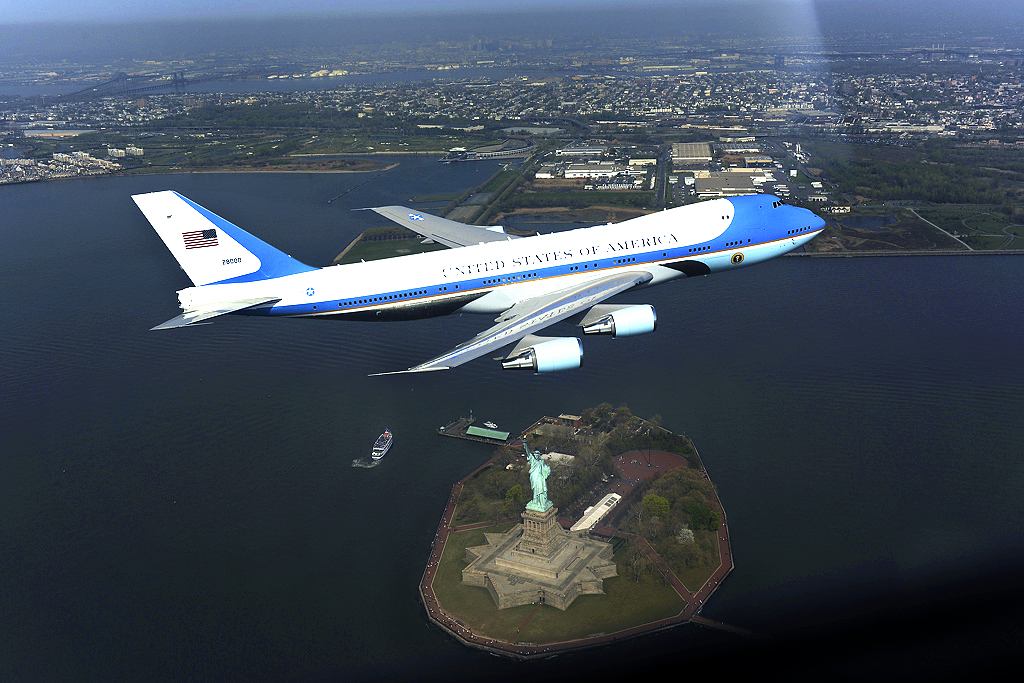
This picture of the plane during the photo op was released by the Department of Defense.

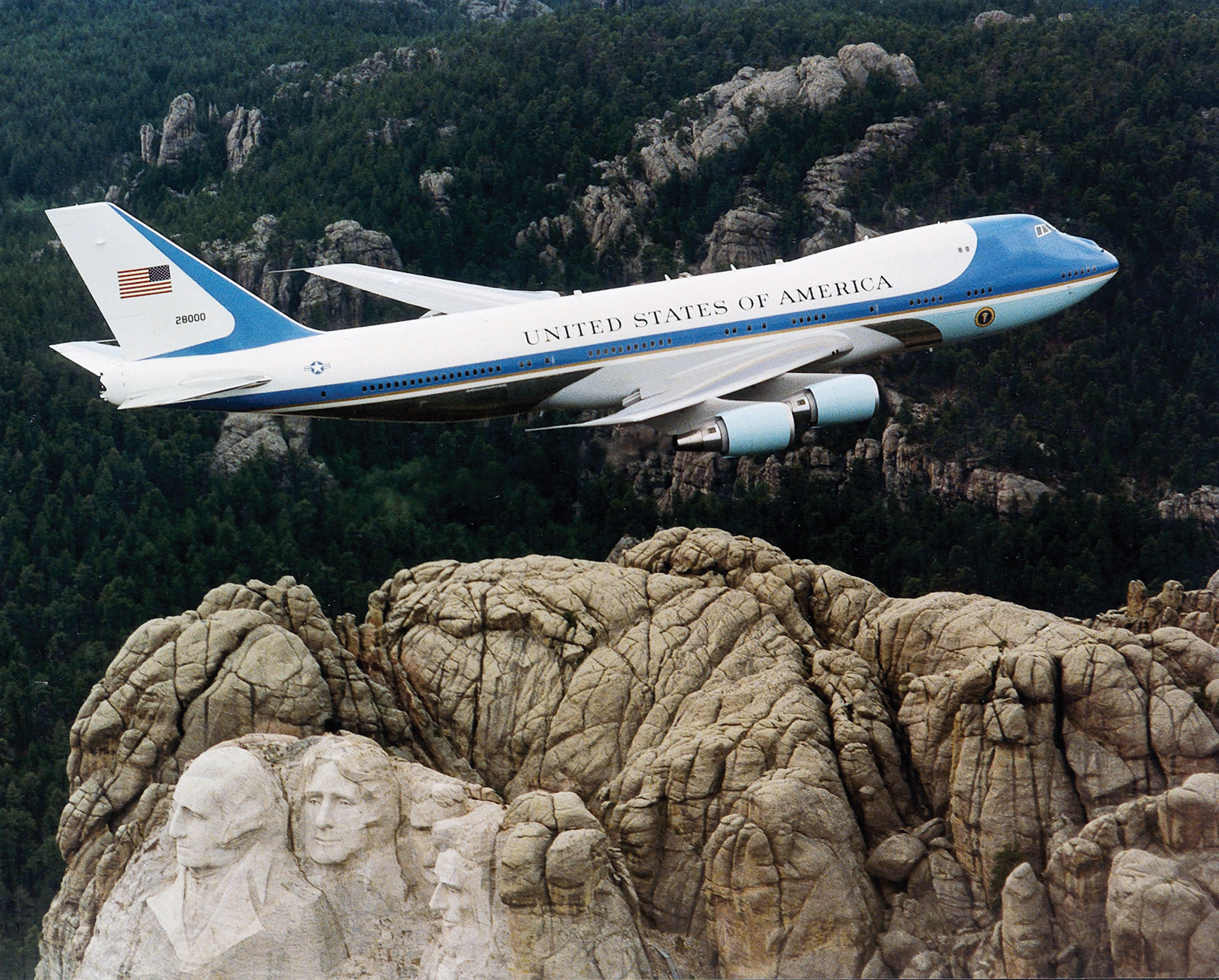
The Mount Rushmore Air Force One image

On the morning of April 27, 2009, a Boeing VC-25 (a Boeing 747 military variant given the call sign "Air Force One" when the president is aboard), followed by a U.S. Air Force F-16 jet fighter, flew low and circled the Upper New York Bay, site of the Statue of Liberty National Monument. The public had not been warned of the flight, which led some on the ground to fear an impending terrorist attack similar to the September 11 attacks. Then-president Barack Obama was not on board the aircraft during the incident.

== Incident ==
The flyby was approved by Louis Caldera, director of the White House Military Office, to update the previous photo of the aircraft flying over Mount Rushmore. Although the planes were engaged in a photo op and training exercise, the citizens of New York and New Jersey had not been informed in advance; some thought it could be the makings of a terrorist attack similar to the September 11 attacks. Some people ran out of buildings and panicked in the streets. Some buildings ordered evacuations.

== Aftermath ==
Fran Townsend, Homeland Security Advisor to George W. Bush, said the flyby was "crass insensitivity". She also said, "I'd call this felony stupidity. This is probably not the right job for Mr. Caldera to be in if he didn't understand the likely reaction of New Yorkers, of the mayor." The Mayor of New York City, Michael Bloomberg, said that the flyby "defies the imagination." Senator Charles Schumer (D-New York) said the Federal Aviation Administration not telling the public about the flyby in advance "borders on being either cruel or very, very stupid." President Barack Obama did not know about the flyby until after it happened, and he stated, "It was a mistake. It was something we found out about along with all of you. And it will not happen again." Although the city's police department had been notified in advance, they had been instructed not to tell the public.

Caldera said of his actions, "Last week, I approved a mission over New York. I take responsibility for that decision... While federal authorities took the proper steps to notify state and local authorities in New York and New Jersey, it's clear that the mission created confusion and disruption. I apologize and take responsibility for any distress that flight caused."

CBS News's New York City affiliate WCBS-TV obtained a memo from the Federal Aviation Administration's James Johnston saying that the agency was aware of "the possibility of public concern regarding DOD (Department of Defense) aircraft flying at low altitudes" in and around the city. However, the agency demanded total secrecy from the city's police department, the Secret Service, the FBI, and the mayor's office, and threatened federal sanctions if the secret was revealed.

=== Investigation ===
Air Force officials estimated the cost for the photo shoot mission to be around $328,835, but stated that "the hours would have been flown regardless, and the expenses would have been accrued on a different mission".

The day after the flyby, White House spokesperson Robert Gibbs said that the incident would be investigated by Deputy Chief of Staff Jim Messina. Gibbs also said that President Obama was "furious" about the flyby. However, Gibbs did not answer reporters' repeated questions about whether or not Caldera would lose his job. Pentagon press secretary Geoff Morrell said that the idea for the flyby originated in the White House Military Office. Gibbs also stated, "Because this was a training mission, the only people on that plane were Air Force personnel."

On May 4, 2009, the White House told reporters that the publicity photos taken during the flight would not be shown to the public. Two days later, the White House reversed course and told reporters that the publicity photos taken during the flight could be released soon. On May 8, the photo was released and it was reported that Caldera had resigned. In his letter of resignation, Caldera told the president that after the incident he was no longer able to "effectively lead the White House Military Office" due to the furor over the incident. On May 9, at the White House Correspondents' Dinner, Obama gave a tongue-in-cheek announcement that his two daughters, Sasha and Malia, were grounded for scaring New Yorkers with Air Force One.

In August, the Associated Press reported that the Air Force used the social networking site Twitter to track the negative public reaction to the incident. Caldera's replacement, George Mulligan, was announced on October 16, 2009.
