= Michael D. Murphy =

American former lawyer and air force officer

First Lieutenant Michael D. Murphy
- Occupations: Lawyer, military officer
- Criminal charges: Conduct unbecoming an officer and a gentleman; Failure to obey a regulation; 3x Larceny
- Military career
- Allegiance: United States
- Branch: United States Air Force
- Service years: ? – 2010
- Rank: First Lieutenant
- Commands: Air Force Legal Operations Agency

Michael D. Murphy is a former lawyer and United States Air Force officer. He was a colonel and commander of the Air Force Legal Operations Agency, and retired as a lieutenant. A former top lawyer in the Air Force, Murphy was relieved of his command on November 30, 2006, after Air Force officials discovered that he had been disbarred more than 20 years earlier and did not have a law license.

== Disbarred in Texas ==
Air Force Times reported that Murphy was disbarred in Texas in 1984 and Louisiana in 1985. Murphy reportedly had never disclosed to his commanders that he was disbarred, despite Air Force rules requiring such disclosure. Murphy had held two of the most elite postings in the Air Force Judge Advocate General's Corps: Commandant of the Judge Advocate General's School and Commander of the Air Force Legal Operations Agency, the latter being the only commander position within the JAG Corps.

Air Force Times reported that Murphy failed to file an appeal on time for a client convicted of burglary in 1981. As a result, the state of Texas sued Murphy in 1982 accusing him of professional misconduct. Texas then suspended Murphy's law license for seven years. In January 1983, Murphy applied to be admitted to the Louisiana bar, stating under oath that he had never been sued nor been the subject of a disciplinary action. Both Texas and Louisiana then permanently disbarred Murphy for lying on his Louisiana bar application, with Texas doing so in May 1984 and Louisiana in September 1985. Murphy then joined the Air Force after being suspended by Texas but before being disbarred by either state.

== Court martial ==
On May 29, 2007, court-martial charges were preferred against Colonel Murphy. The charges were absence without leave; failure to obey order/dereliction of duty, false official statement, larceny and conduct unbecoming an officer and a gentleman in violation of the Uniform Code of Military Justice (UCMJ) Articles 86, 92, 107, 121, and 133, respectively. The charges were forwarded to Major General Robert L. Smolen, Commander, Air Force District of Washington, for disposition.

On April 14, 2008, Colonel Murphy was arraigned. If convicted of all charges, Murphy faced up to 41 years in prison.

Military members facing punishment may raise a "good soldier defense" that draws in specifics of their duty performance as mitigation against the charges against them. Murphy's performance record while assigned as White House Military Office (WHMO) general counsel from late 2001 to early 2005 remains under a nondisclosure agreement Murphy was required to sign as part of his assignment. The WHMO declined to release Murphy from his nondisclosure agreement, so Murphy was unable to discuss specifics of his assignment even to his lawyers. Records show Murphy had served with distinction, earning praise and promotion recommendations from superiors. The military judge ruled that without the WHMO records, Murphy would be unable to present a good soldier defense or adequately present mitigation evidence, and that the maximum punishment authorized would be no further punishment.

On March 30, 2009, Murphy's court-martial began at Bolling Air Force Base in the District of Columbia, where he once was head of the Air Force Legal Operations Agency. Murphy was convicted of three counts of conduct unbecoming an officer and a gentleman, one count of failure to obey a general regulation, two counts of larceny greater than $500 and one count of larceny less than $500. The charges for conduct unbecoming an officer and a gentleman and failure to obey a regulation relate to Murphy's alleged failure to inform the Air Force of his disbarment in Texas and Louisiana while continuing to serve in positions that require a valid law license.

== Retirement ==
On February 22, 2010, Air Force spokeswoman Lt. Col. Barbara Carson announced that Murphy would be honorably retired from the Air Force effective April 1, 2010. A commissioned officer is retired in the highest grade in which he served satisfactorily. Murphy was retired in the grade of first lieutenant.
