= Nuclear football =

US device for a nuclear attack order

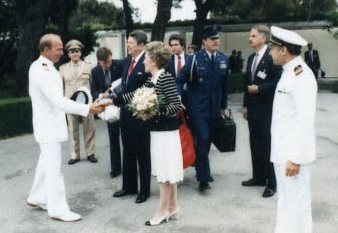
President Reagan and Nancy Reagan in 1987—the military aide at right-center is carrying the nuclear football

The nuclear football, officially the Presidential Emergency Satchel, is a briefcase, the contents of which are to be used by the president of the United States to communicate and authorize a nuclear attack while away from fixed command centers, such as the White House Situation Room or the Presidential Emergency Operations Center. Functioning as a mobile hub in the strategic defense system of the United States, the football is carried by a military aide when the president is traveling.

== Name ==
The briefcase is officially named the "Presidential Emergency Satchel". During the administration of Dwight Eisenhower, the briefcase was most commonly nicknamed the "satchel" or the "black bag."

By the time of President John F. Kennedy's assassination, if not earlier, the briefcase was also becoming known as the "football." General Chester Clifton said in 1986 that the term was used "jokingly", and he described how warrant officers, who were on a twenty-four hour schedule, would regularly hand off the briefcase to the next person. That routine could have inspired the football metaphor, which dovetailed with the Kennedy clan's penchant for touch football. Various sources claim, often mentioning Secretary of Defense Robert McNamara as a source, that the term "football" was derived from a nuclear attack plan codenamed "Dropkick." When and where McNamara made such a statement has not been cited nor is there an original source for the "Dropkick" reference. That claim may have a fictitious premise because "Dropkick" appears distinctively in the film Dr. Strangelove when the character General Buck Turgidson (George C. Scott) informs President Merkin Muffley (Peter Sellers) that the wayward B-52s headed to the Soviet Union "were part of a special exercise we were holding called Operation Dropkick."

During 1965, President Lyndon B. Johnson discussed with Robert McNamara an arrangement to eliminate the "need for an aide to be in constant attendance upon him." Word of that proposal began to circulate in the media prompting White House aide Jack Valenti to deny that it had been under consideration. The newspaper article citing the denial, the syndicated "Allen-Scott Report," is perhaps the earliest public reference to the "football," quoting Valenti as saying that "The 'black bag' or 'football', as we call it, goes wherever the President travels."

== Contents ==
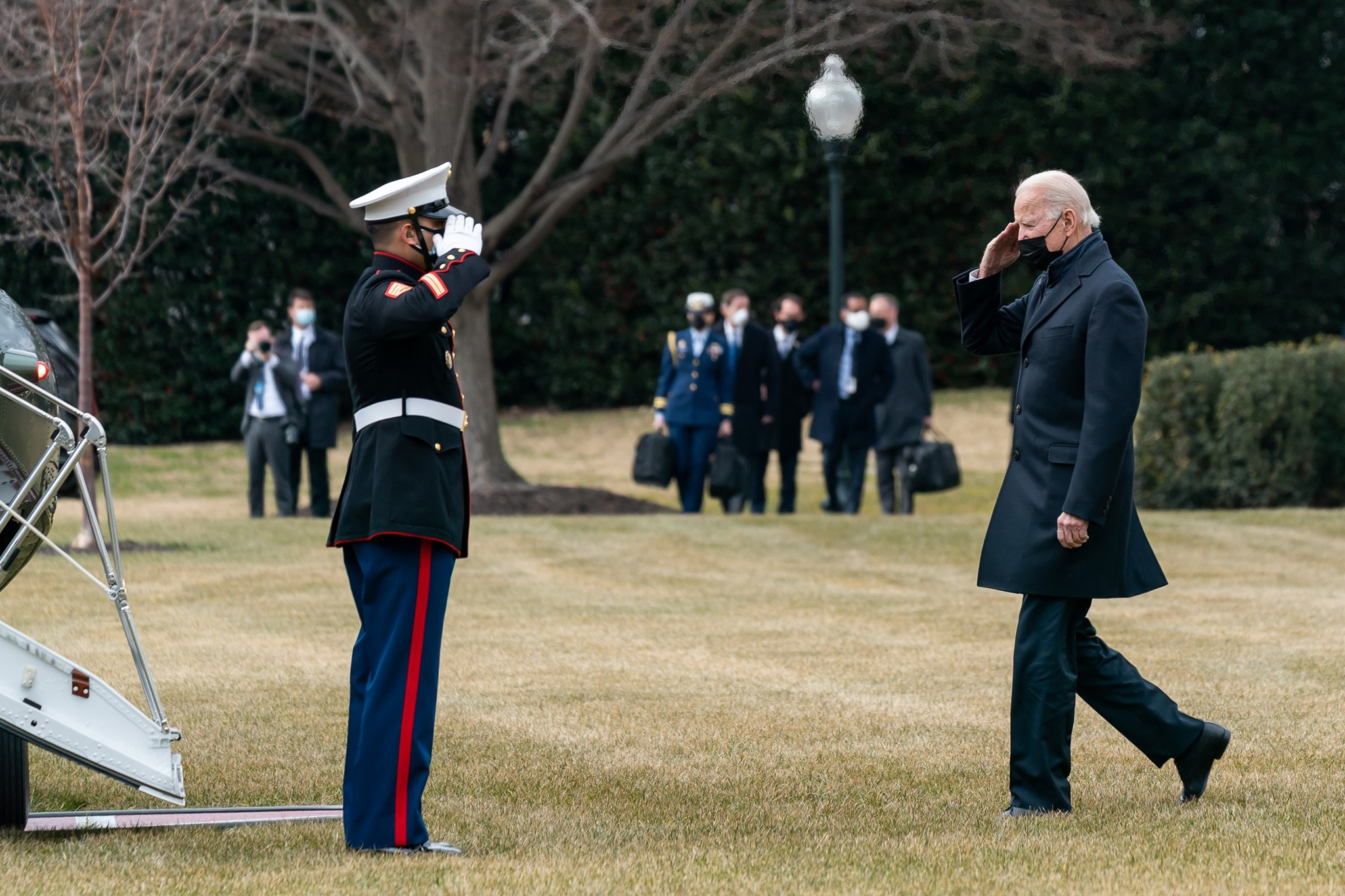
President Biden about to board Marine One—the military aide at back-center is carrying the nuclear football

In his 1980 book Breaking Cover, Bill Gulley, former director of the White House Military Office, wrote:

There are four things in the Football. The Black Book containing the retaliatory options, a book listing classified site locations, a manila folder with eight or ten pages stapled together giving a description of procedures for the Emergency Broadcast System, and a three-by-five-inch [7.5 × 13 cm] card with authentication codes. The Black Book was about 9 by 12 inches [23 × 30 cm] and had 75 loose-leaf pages printed in black and red. The book with classified site locations was about the same size as the Black Book, and was black. It contained information on sites around the country where the president could be taken in an emergency.

The president is always accompanied by a military aide carrying the nuclear football with launch codes for nuclear weapons. It has been described both as a metal Zero Halliburton briefcase and as a leather briefcase weighing about 45 pounds (20 kg), with photographic evidence existing of the latter. A small antenna protrudes from the bag near the handle, suggesting that it also contains communications equipment of some kind.

A popular misconception, sometimes deriving from pop culture, is that the football contains a large red button, which when pressed, launches a nuclear attack.

== Operation ==
Video describing the United States' nuclear launch authorization process

If the U.S. president, who is the commander-in-chief of the armed forces, decides to order the use of nuclear weapons, the briefcase would be opened. A command signal, or "watch" alert, would be issued to the United States Strategic Command and perhaps the Joint Chiefs of Staff. The president would review the attack options with others such as the secretary of defense and the chairman of the Joint Chiefs of Staff and decide on a plan, which could range from the launch of a single ICBM or nuclear-armed bomber to options for multiple, even hundreds of ICBMs or bombers. These are among the preset war plans developed under OPLAN 8010 (formerly the Single Integrated Operational Plan). A two-person verification procedure would precede the entering of the codes into a permissive action link.

Before the order can be followed by the military, the president must be positively identified using a special code issued on a plastic card, nicknamed the "biscuit". The authentication is conducted between the president and the National Military Command Center deputy director of operations, using a challenge code of two phonetic letters. The president will read, from the biscuit, the daily phonetic letters, and the deputy director will confirm or deny that it is correct, confirmation indicating the person is the president and the attack orders can be given. Down the chain of command, the United States has a two-man rule in place at nuclear launch facilities. This verification process ensures the order came from the actual president. Many sources indicate that the president has sole launch authority, and the defense secretary has no veto power. A Congressional Research Service provides a detailed reason: There is a short time before nuclear weapons from adversaries will strike US soil and a similar short time when advisers relay options to the US President. During the Cold War, some analysts argued that a launch under attack was the best option, and that the command and control system was designed to permit such a quick launch of U.S. nuclear weapons. The time for any US response was noted as thirty minutes. Secondly, the US may conduct a pre-emptive strike if the assessment was its territory or allies were facing an imminent nuclear attack. The chairman of the Joint Chiefs of Staff will also be an advisor to the President, but is by law only allowed to advise, and has no operational control over US forces. The secretary of defense also advises but the Goldwater–Nichols Act Section 162(b) states the chain of command to a unified or specified combatant command runs "from the president to the secretary of defense," and "from the secretary of defense to the commander of the combatant command".

However, it has been argued that the president may not have sole authority to initiate a nuclear attack because the defense secretary is required to verify the order but cannot veto it. U.S. law dictates that the attack must be lawful; military officers are required to refuse to execute unlawful orders, such as those that violate international humanitarian law.

Some military officials, including General John Hyten, have testified to the U.S. Congress that they would refuse to carry out an unlawful order for a nuclear strike. In addition, off-the-shelf strike packages are pre-vetted by lawyers to confirm that they are legal and, thus, such a strike would be presumed to be a lawful order.

Military service members have been reprimanded for questioning U.S. protocols for nuclear strike authority. In 1975, Major Harold Hering was discharged from the Air Force for asking, "How can I know that an order I receive to launch my missiles came from a sane president?" Nevertheless, the president, once in office, as noted by former defense secretary William Perry and Tom Z. Collina, retains the sole authority to launch a nuclear strike or attack.

The football is carried by one of the rotating presidential military aides (one from each of the six armed forces service branches), whose work schedule is top-secret. This person is a commissioned officer in the U.S. military, pay-grade O-4 or above, who has undergone the nation's most rigorous background check (Yankee White). These officers are required to keep the football readily accessible to the president at all times. Consequently, this officer carries the football either standing or walking near the president at all times, including riding on Air Force One, on Marine One, or in the presidential motorcade with the president.

There are three nuclear footballs in total; two are allocated to the president and vice president, with the last being stored in the White House. The practice of also providing an aide with a football to the vice president, to whom command authority would devolve if the president is disabled or deceased, began during the Carter administration. In presidential transitions, the president-elect does not receive the actual nuclear code card until after the nuclear briefing, which usually occurs when "he meets with the outgoing president at the White House just before the actual inauguration ceremony. The code card is activated electronically right after the president-elect takes the oath at noon".

If the outgoing president is not present at the inauguration—as happened in 2021 when Donald Trump did not attend the inauguration of Joe Biden but stayed in Florida—one football is kept with him and remains active until 11:59:59 a.m. on inauguration day. After that point, the now-former president is denied access to the football, its codes are automatically deactivated, and the aide carrying the football returns to Washington, D.C. In the meantime, the incoming president receives one of the spare footballs at the pre-inauguration nuclear briefing, as well as a "biscuit" with codes that become active at 12:00:00 noon.

According to military analyst and whistleblower Daniel Ellsberg, presidents beginning with Dwight D. Eisenhower have in fact delegated nuclear launch authority to military commanders who may then sub-delegate authority further. In Ellsberg's view, the nuclear football is primarily a piece of political theater, a hoax that obscures the real chain of nuclear command and control. Effective deterrence requires it, because otherwise a single nuclear detonation on Washington would prevent retaliation.

== History ==
The nuclear football dates to the last years of the presidency of Dwight D. Eisenhower, when it became an instrument for White House emergency preparations and presidential control over nuclear weapons. The notion that a designated military aide should accompany a traveling president with a special satchel for such purposes was the creation of White House naval aide Edward L. Beach Jr. On 19 January 1961, the day before his inauguration, president-elect John F. Kennedy received a briefing from President Eisenhower and his staff secretary General Andrew Goodpaster on emergency procedures in a nuclear crisis. Goodpaster described the contents of the "satchel," with plans for implementing Federal Emergency Plan D-Minus, and a document authorizing nuclear weapons use in a crisis. That was the Joint Chief of Staff Emergency Actions File, which included instructions for U.S. commanders to transfer nuclear weapons to NATO allies and arrangements to enable the president to participate in an emergency telephone conference with the defense secretary and the Joint Chiefs of Staff. Goodpaster also showed Kennedy a booklet of instructions for military commanders providing advanced authorization (pre-delegation) for nuclear weapons use in the event that the President had not survived a nuclear attack and communications with Washington, D.C., were cut off.

During his administration, President Kennedy routinized the satchel, which was known as the "black bag". When the Berlin Crisis raised questions about a possible nuclear emergency in January 1962, Kennedy discussed with White House Naval Aide Tazewell Shepard what procedures would be necessary for making a nuclear response during a military confrontation and how he would direct the Pentagon to do so. Shepard formulated questions that Kennedy could use during a meeting with the Joint Chiefs on methods for communicating and authenticating presidential instructions in a crisis. The questions concerned procedures for contacting the Joint War Room at the Pentagon if the president believed it necessary to "launch an immediate nuclear strike against the Communist Bloc"—for example, If the president used the "red button" on the telephone to contact the War Room, what would he say to make such a request and how would the instructions be verified.

A record of the Kennedy-Joint Chiefs of Staff conference has not been disclosed, but according to National Security Adviser McGeorge Bundy, one takeaway from the discussion was that the president expected to be able "to initiate, as well as participate in, an emergency conference with the secretary of defense and the Joint Chiefs of Staff." Bundy expected the Pentagon to cooperate by holding practice drills so that that War Room staff could handle a presidential request. Another administrative response may have been the inclusion in the "Black Bag" of a card, later known as the "Biscuit," with the codes needed to authorize launches of nuclear weapons. According to William Manchester's account, by the time of Kennedy's assassination, the "Black Bag" included such codes, as well as contact details for communicating with the British Prime Minister and the President of France in a nuclear crisis. It also included several dozen Emergency Action Papers, later known as Presidential Emergency Action Documents (PEADs), including proclamations for martial law.

A major component of the "Black Bag" was the "SIOP Execution Handbook," also known as the "Gold Book," with details on the Single Integrated Operational Plan attack options available to decision-makers. Kennedy had received several briefings on the SIOP, which acquainted him with its basic features. To protect such sensitive contents, the "Black Bag" was by November 1963 a "thirty-pound metal suitcase with an intricate combination lock." There was some consideration during 1965 of finding ways to reduce the weight, apparently to no avail because recent accounts describe the weight as 45 pounds (20 kg).

During the Eisenhower administration, Vice President Richard Nixon had an emergency satchel assigned to him. When Kennedy became president, one of the White House military aides sent a satchel to Vice President Lyndon B. Johnson, but his office returned it for unexplained reasons. According to JCS chairman General Maxwell D. Taylor, Johnson knew about the satchel, but never received a briefing on it before he became president. As President Johnson possibly found stressful the presence of the military aide carrying the football, on one trip during his 1964 campaign, the aide flew on a separate plane.

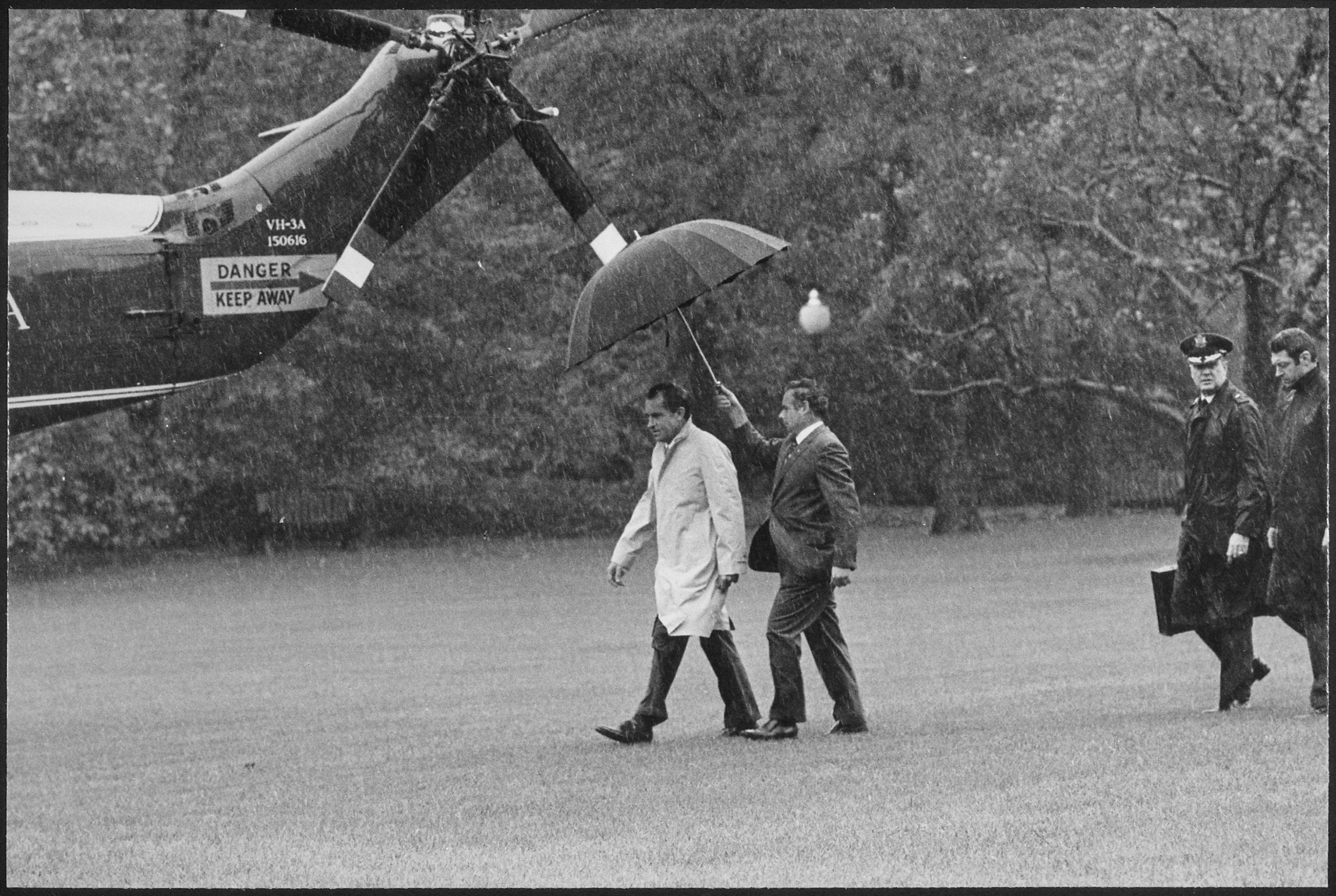
President Nixon walking to Marine One—he is being followed by a military aide carrying the nuclear football

As the football became a routine element of the presidential entourage some information about it appeared. A 1965 Baltimore Sun article reported on how the launch codes could be transmitted in a crisis and on the systems that were in place at the Pentagon to verify presidential orders. Public officials hosting presidents sometimes noticed an aide carrying the football. When President Richard Nixon attended the ceremonial opening of the Bay Area Rapid Transit in September 1972, his hosts were aware of a "peculiar briefcase" carried by a U.S. Marine officer. Mishaps could occur. At Camp David in 1973, when Soviet general secretary Leonid Brezhnev spontaneously drove off with Nixon in a Lincoln Continental that the President had given him, Nixon was separated from the Secret Service and presumably the bagman. One president may have been unwilling to accommodate the football holder when traveling from the White House. Reportedly, Jimmy Carter refused to let the military aide stay in a trailer at his residence in Plains, Georgia, although Carter later denied the allegation.

When Carter was president, he began to carry the "biscuit" in a jacket pocket. Carter supposedly lost the card in a suit that went to the dry cleaner. The "biscuit" was separated from a severely wounded Ronald Reagan immediately after the 1981 assassination attempt when the George Washington University hospital emergency department trauma team cut into his clothing. It was later discovered lying unsecured in one of his shoes on the emergency department floor. During the incident, Reagan was separated from the rest of the football as well, because the officer who carried it was left behind as the motorcade sped away with the wounded president.

In 1999, President Bill Clinton quickly left a NATO summit meeting that ended early, leaving the aide carrying the football behind. The aide then walked back to the White House (with the football) "without incident".

=== Recent times ===
As the nuclear football is required to be near the president at all times, the aides carrying it frequently appear in press photographs. In February 2017, a guest at President Trump's Mar-a-Lago resort posed for a photo with the military aide carrying the football, posting the image to Facebook and identifying the aide by his first name. The photo was posted while Trump was hosting Japanese prime minister Shinzo Abe, around the same time as news broke that North Korea had fired a nuclear-capable Pukguksong-2 ballistic missile over the Sea of Japan. U.S. military officials clarified that it was neither illegal nor against proper procedure for the officer to appear in such a photo, although they conceded that the situation was strange.

On November 8, 2017, when President Trump made a state visit to China, U.S. military aides carrying the football were reportedly involved in a "short scuffle" with Chinese security officials, after the latter tried to bar the former access to the Great Hall of the People auditorium. Political correspondent Jonathan Swan, who reported the incident, wrote, "I'm told that at no point did the Chinese have the nuclear football in their possession or even touch the briefcase. I'm also told the head of the Chinese security detail apologised to the Americans afterwards for the misunderstanding."

On January 6, 2021, during the storming of the United States Capitol by rioters, security footage, displayed during the subsequent Trump impeachment trial, showed Vice President Mike Pence along with the aide carrying the backup football being hastily evacuated from the Senate chamber. While the vice president was sheltering with his team and family, the football came within 100 feet (30 m) of the approaching rioters. Its capture during the event could have resulted in the loss of sensitive intelligence surrounding pre-planned nuclear strike options. It was later reported that military officials were unaware of the danger to the football during the riot.

Following President Trump's failure to secure a second term in 2020, he did not attend President Biden's inauguration, when the football is normally handed over. Instead, Trump's football remained with him while a second one accompanied Biden. At the noon EST transition time, the codes in the footballs accompanying Trump and Pence (who did attend the inauguration) were deactivated, and those in Biden's and incoming vice president Kamala Harris's were activated.

In February 2021, a group of 31 members of Congress signed a letter requesting that President Biden give up sole authority to use the nuclear launch codes. The letter asked Biden "to install checks [and] balances in our nuclear command-and-control structure" and proposed alternatives to the existing structure.

The 1986 Goldwater–Nichols Act streamlined the military chain of command, which now runs from the president through the secretary of defense directly to combatant commanders (CCDRs, all four-star generals or admirals), bypassing the service chiefs. The service chiefs were assigned to an advisory role to the president and the secretary of defense and given the responsibility for training and equipping personnel in the unified combatant commands.

== See also ==
- Cheget, the Russian counterpart
- Continuity of government
- Emergency Action Message
- Gold Codes
- Letters of last resort, the British counterpart
- Nuclear briefcase
- Permissive action link
- Roger Fisher, the academic who proposed putting the nuclear codes inside a person so that the US president has to take a life to activate the country's nuclear weapons
- Suitcase nuclear device
