= Yankee White =

Background check for people working close to the US president

Yankee White is an administrative nickname for a background check undertaken in the United States for Department of Defense personnel and contractor employees working with the president and vice president. Most personnel assigned to Presidential Support duties requiring Yankee White investigations must undergo a Single Scope Background Investigation (SSBI) by the Defense Counterintelligence and Security Agency.

== Policy and implementation ==
The initial directive detailing the checks required was DoD Directive 5210.55, "Selection of DoD Military and Civilian Personnel and Contractor Employees for Assignment to Presidential Support Activities" issued on July 6, 1977. This was revised on 15 December 1998. DoD Instruction 5210.87 contains detailed information for the implementation of the policy, assignment of responsibilities and prescription of procedures to be followed. The administrative nickname "Yankee White" is referred to in the implementing instruction.

== Types of Presidential Support Activities positions ==
There are three categories of Presidential Support Activities positions.

- Category one positions involve selected personnel serving in extremely sensitive positions in direct support of the president or vice president. This includes:
  - White House Military Office (WHMO)
    - Director, Airlift Operations Office
    - Director, Presidential Contingency Programs Office
    - Director, Special Programs Office
    - National Security Advisor
  - Military aides to the President and Vice President
  - Director, White House Medical Unit
  - Chief, US Army Transportation Agency, White House
  - Food Service Coordinator of the White House Staff Mess
  - Commander and Deputy Commander, White House Communications Agency
  - Presidential Pilot and Deputy Presidential Pilot, 89th Airlift Wing, Andrews AFB
  - Commanding Officer and Executive Officer, Marine Helicopter Squadron One (HMX-1)
  - Commanding Officer and Executive Officer, Naval Support Facility Thurmont, MD (Camp David)
  - Other personnel as determined by the WHMO director and the deputy assistant to the vice president for national security affairs
- Category two positions involve personnel assigned on a permanent or full-time basis to duties in direct support of the president or vice president (including the office staff of the WHMO director and all individuals under their control). This includes but is not limited to:
  - Presidential aircrew and associated maintenance and security personnel
  - White House Communications Agency personnel
  - White House Transportation Agency personnel
  - White House Staff Mess personnel
  - White House Medical Unit personnel
  - DoD personnel assigned to the Office of the Vice President
  - Personnel assigned to the Naval Support Facility Thurmont, MD, more commonly known as "Camp David".
  - Employees of contractor firms who provide recurring services or who require unescorted access to presidential support areas (PSAs), activities, or equipment—including the maintenance of the Presidential retreat or Vice President's residence, communications, aircraft, or facilities
  - Principals of those firms used for PSAs who have direct involvement in the contract
- Category three positions are those involving personnel assigned to honor guard units, ceremonial units, and military bands who perform at presidential or vice presidential functions and facilities.

== See also ==
- Presidential Service Badge
- Security clearance
