= Presidential Food Service =

Coordinates: 38.8974°N 77.0377°W

- Active: 1951–present
- Country: United States
- Branch: United States Navy
- Role: Providing worldwide food service, security, and personal support to the president and first family of the United States
- Nicknames: White House Mess; Navy Mess
- Decorations: Joint Meritorious Unit Awards (7); Navy Unit Commendation; Meritorious Unit Commendation

The Presidential Food Service (formerly and sometimes also known as the White House Mess or the Navy Mess) is a branch of the United States Navy established in 1951 that provides worldwide food service, security, and personal support to the president and first family of the United States. It also provides gourmet meals and supports catered functions and social aide dinners for visiting heads of state.

== Operations ==
The Presidential Food Service was established in 1951, and is run by the United States Navy.

It provides worldwide food service, security, and personal support to the president and first family of the United States. It also provides gourmet meals and supports catered functions and social aide dinners for visiting heads of state.

It operates the White House Mess executive dining rooms, provides a carryout service, and provides catering coordination to the White House Complex. It also provides logistics co-ordination for White House Mess personnel and valet services for presidential trips and events. Before starting as members of the Presidential Food Service, personnel are subject to a thorough lengthy personal background check.

== The White House Mess ==
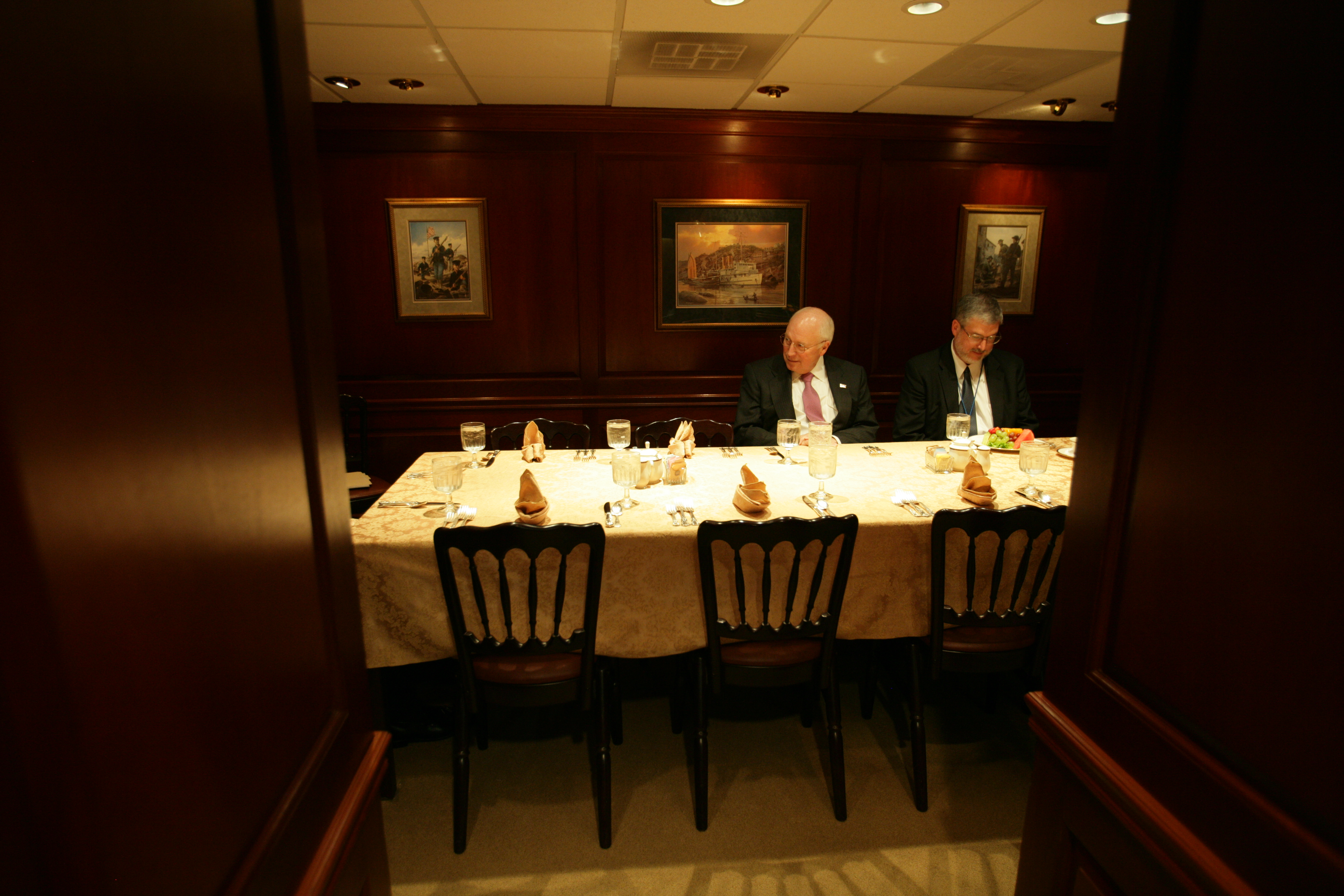
Vice President Cheney and David Addington at lunch in the White House Mess

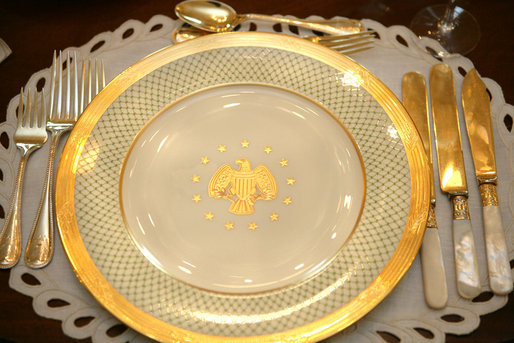
George W. Bush White House state china

The White House Mess is now a small wood-paneled dining facility. It is located in the basement of the West Wing, adjacent to the Situation Room.

It seats 50 people at 12 tables.

== History ==
In 2015, the Presidential Food Service decided to serve only "meat and poultry that have not been treated with hormones or antibiotics."
