= White House Transportation Agency =

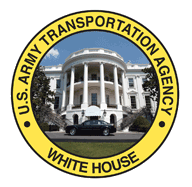
- Branch: US Army
- Role: Providing transportation for government officials
- Part of: Office of the Chief of Transportation

Insignia
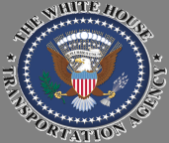
- Identification symbol

The White House Transportation Agency (WHTA) provides motor vehicle transportation to the White House as directed by the White House Military Office. This includes 24/7 ground transportation for the president's family, the White House staff, official visitors of the first family and other authorized personnel. Members of the WHTA perform all duties associated with transportation, including driving armored cars, preparing Air Force One for take-off, and driving in the presidential motorcade. Staff of the agency are all non-commissioned officers of the United States Army.
