= White House Communications Agency =

US government agency

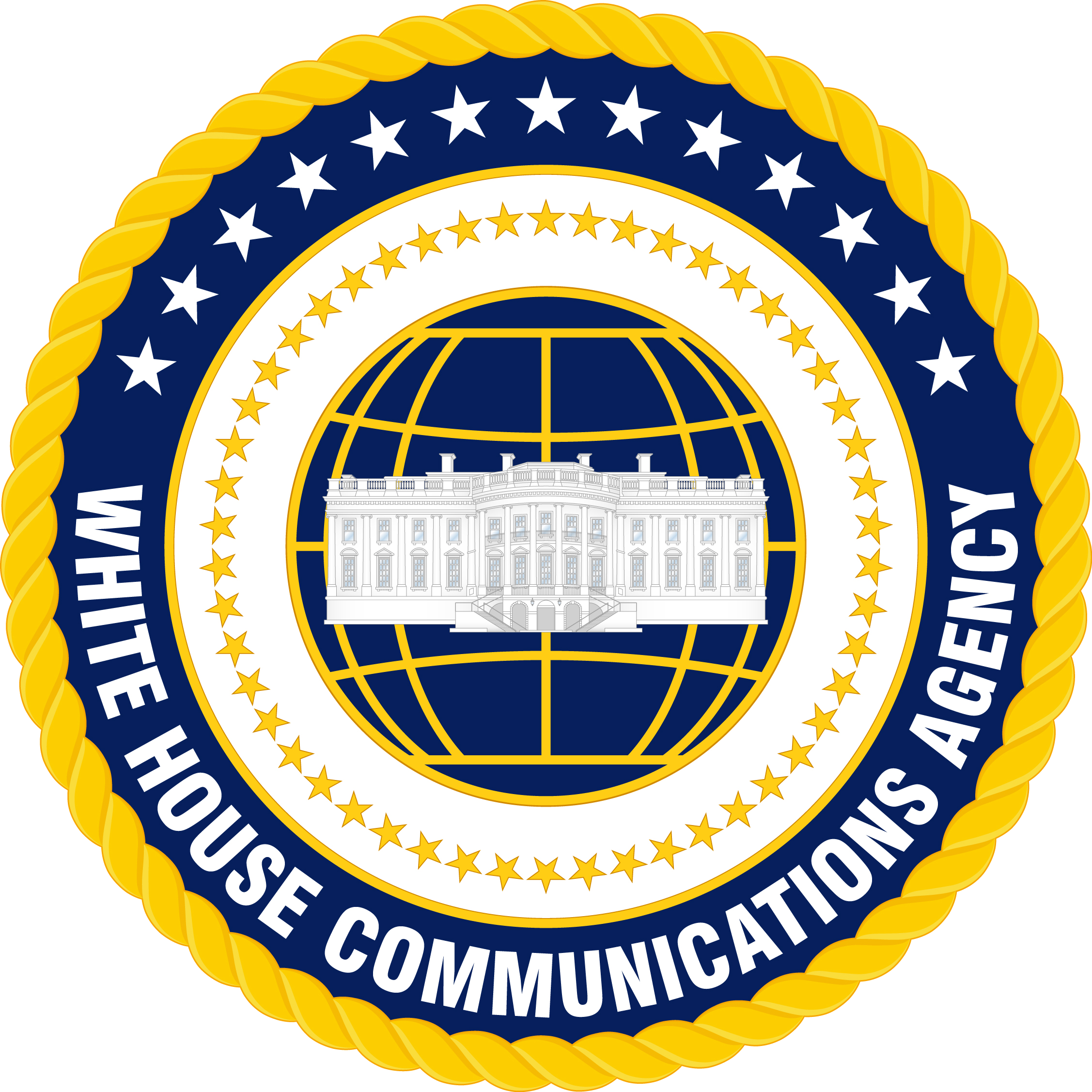
- WHCA seal

Agency overview
- Formed: March 25, 1942
- Preceding agencies: White House Signal Corps (WHSC); White House Signal Detachment (WHSD); White House Army Signal Agency (WHASA); Defense Communications Agency
- Jurisdiction: United States, Defense Information Systems Agency
- Headquarters: Naval Support Facility Anacostia, Washington, D.C.
- Employees: 501–1,000
- Agency executive: Col Kevin Childs, U.S. Airforce
- Parent agency: Defense Information Systems Agency

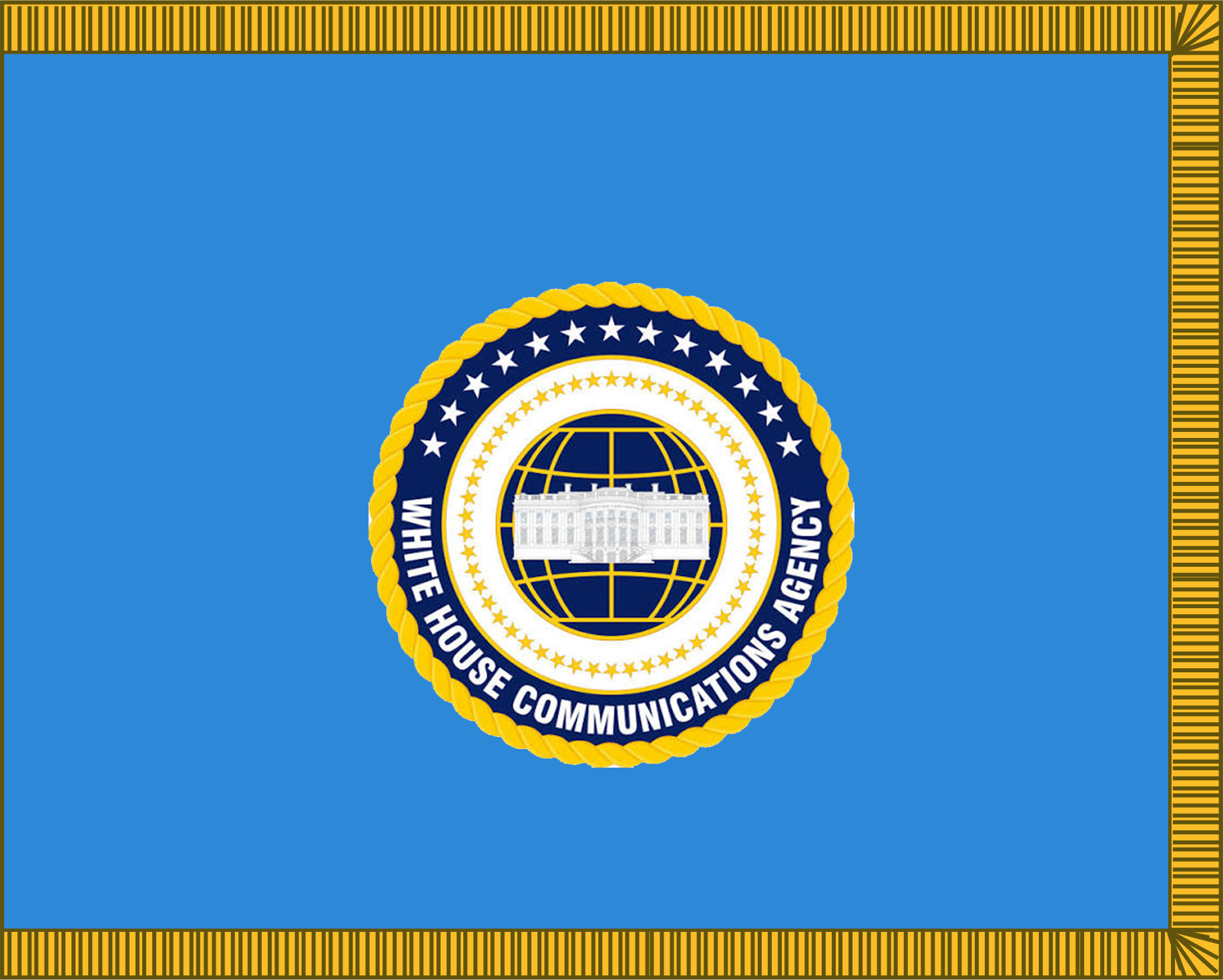
White House Communications Agency Flag

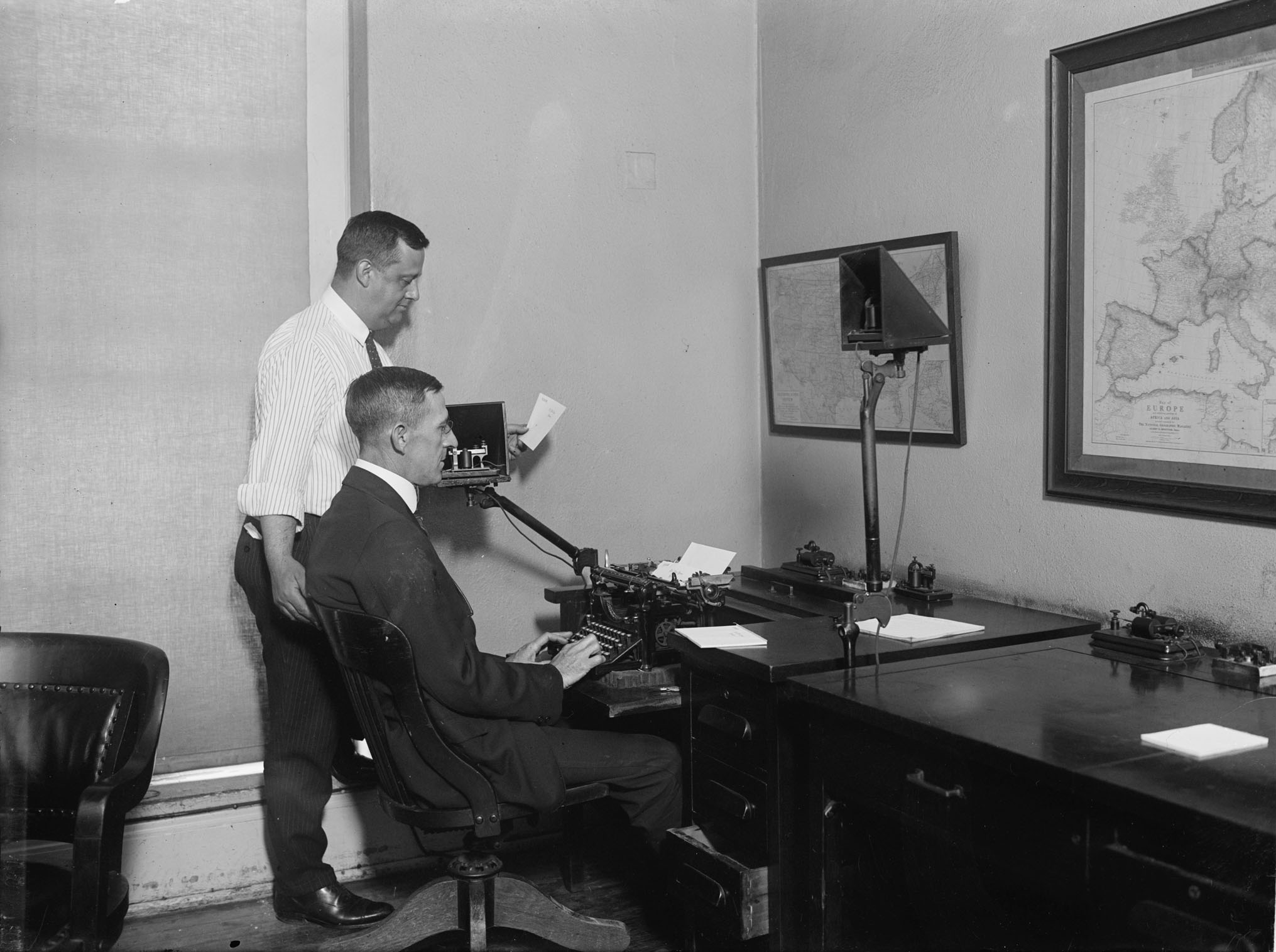
Telegraph room, White House, 1923

The White House Communications Agency (WHCA), originally known as the White House Signal Corps (WHSC) and then the White House Signal Detachment (WHSD), was officially formed by the United States Department of War on March 25, 1942, under President Franklin D. Roosevelt. The organization was created to provide secure normal, secret, and emergency communications requirements supporting the president. The organization provided mobile radio, Teletype, telegraph, telephone and cryptographic aides in the White House and at "Shangri-La" (now known as Camp David). The organizational mission was to provide a premier communication system enabling the president to lead the nation effectively.

== Reorganization ==
In 1954, during the Eisenhower administration, the WHSD was reorganized under the Office of the Chief Signal Officer, Army Signal Corps as a Class II unit and renamed the White House Army Signal Agency (WHASA). In 1962, WHASA was discontinued by order of the United States secretary of defense under President John F. Kennedy. Its duties were transferred to the auspices of the Defense Communications Agency under the operational control of the White House Military Office, and reestablished as the White House Communications Agency.

== Role ==
WHCA has played an unremarked, but significant role in many historical events, including: World War II, the Korean War, the Vietnam War, Panama and Guatemala, Operation Just Cause, Operations Desert Shield and Desert Storm, and Operation Restore Hope in Somalia. WHCA was also a key player in documenting the assassination of President John F. Kennedy and the attempted assassinations of presidents Gerald Ford and Ronald Reagan. Richard Nixon awarded the agency the Presidential Unit Citation in recognition of their performance during his 1972 visit to China.

== Organization ==
The WHCA's official mission is “to provide telecommunications and other related support to the president of the United States and to other elements related to the president,” the vice president, the National Security Council, Secret Service and the president's staff. The White House Communications Agency is a joint service agency composed of Army, Air Force, Navy, Coast Guard, and Marine Corps personnel. The agency evolved over the past 60 years from a small team of 32 personnel working out of the basement of the White House to a thousand-person self-supporting joint service command during the George W. Bush presidency. The headquarters for WHCA is at Joint Base Anacostia–Bolling and consists of six staff elements and seven organizational units. WHCA also has supporting detachments in Washington, D.C., and various locations throughout the United States. WHCA is organized into functional areas, each with its own mission in support of the total WHCA mission of presidential support.

== Members ==
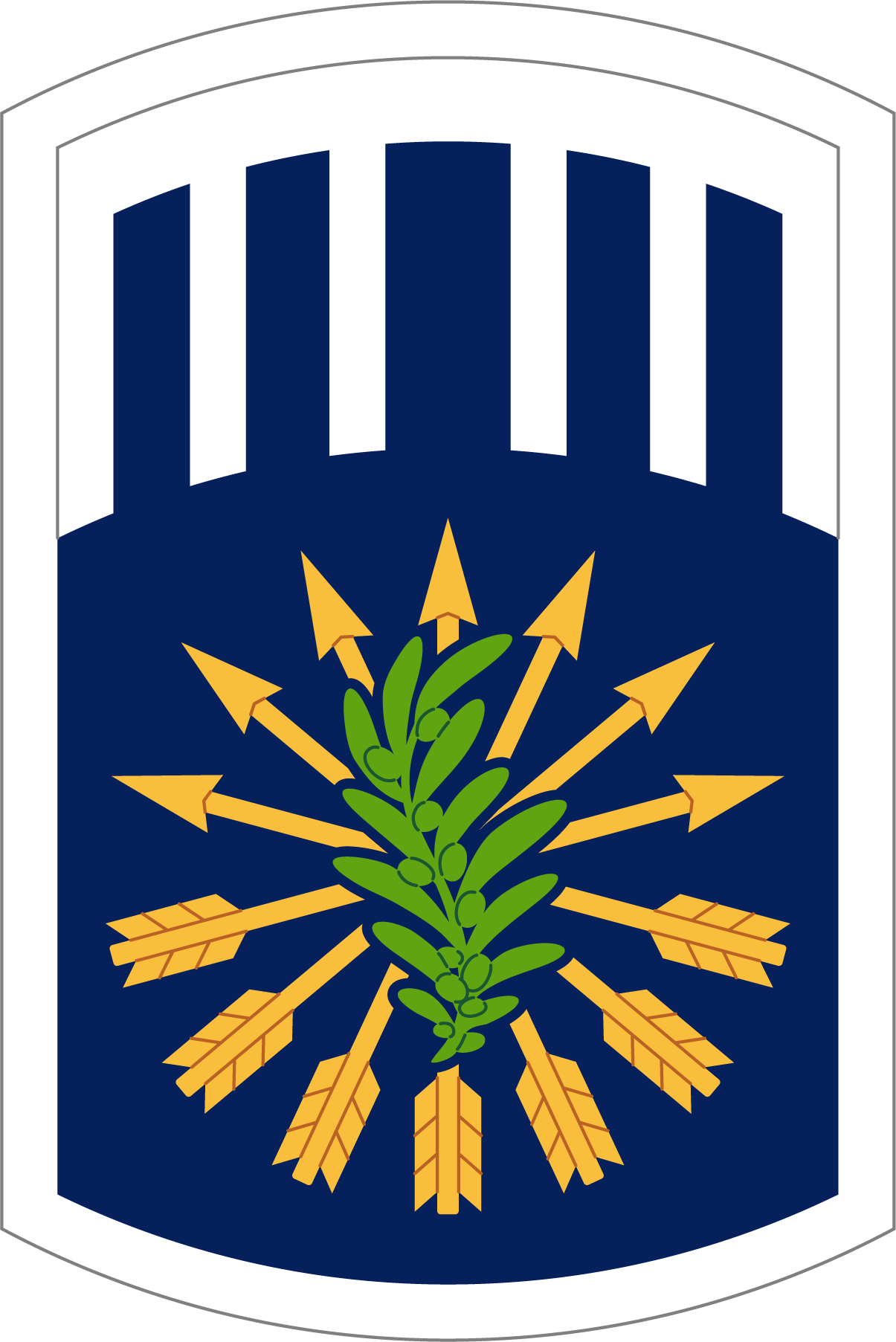
White House Communications Agency-Army Element Shoulder Sleeve Insignia

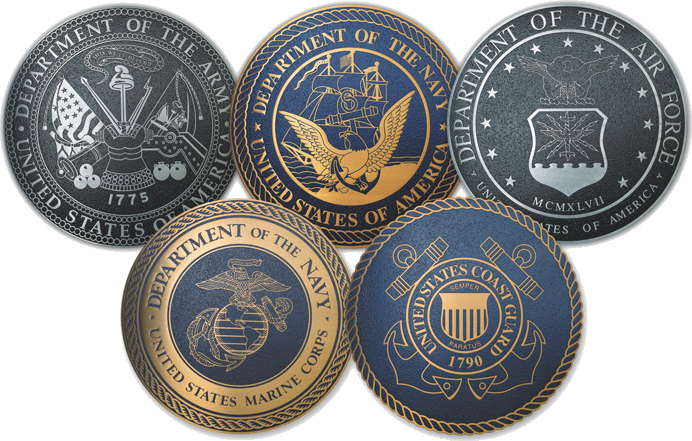
Seals of the branches of the United States Armed Forces

The White House Communications Agency is a joint military unit. It has members from each branch of service: United States Air Force (USAF), United States Army (USA), United States Coast Guard (USCG), United States Marine Corps (USMC), and the United States Navy (USN). They are stringently vetted before being admitted. After meritorious service of 365 days, typically, its uniformed service members are awarded the Presidential Service Badge.

WHCA also maintains many civilian employees throughout the agency and satellite locations.

== Criticisms ==
In 1996, the House Committee on Government Reform and Oversight recommended that the WHCA be deactivated and that the president pay for private contractors to provide the same services from the Executive Services budget.
