= Executive Office appointments of the second Trump administration =

The core White House staff appointments, and most Executive Office of the President officials generally, are not required to be confirmed by the U.S. Senate, with a handful of exceptions (e.g., the director of the Office of Management and Budget, the chair and members of the Council of Economic Advisers, and the United States trade representative). There are about 4,000 positions in the Executive Office of the President.

== Color key ==
Denotes appointees serving in offices that did not require Senate confirmation.

Denotes appointees confirmed by the Senate.

Denotes appointees awaiting Senate confirmation.

Denotes appointees serving in an acting capacity.

Denotes appointees who have left office or offices which have been disbanded.

Denotes nominees who were withdrawn prior to being confirmed or assuming office.

== Appointments ==
| Office | Nominee | Assumed office | Left office |
=== White House Office ===
Office of the Chief of Staff
| White House Chief of Staff | Stephen Miller | November 9, 2026 | |
| White House Chief of Staff | Susie Wiles | January 20, 2025 | November 6, 2026 |
| White House Deputy Chief of Staff | Dan Scavino (Note: Concurrently serves as Homeland Security Advisor) | January 20, 2025 | |
| White House Deputy Chief of Staff (Policy) | Stephen Miller | January 20, 2025 | November 9, 2026 |
| White House Deputy Chief of Staff (Legislative, Political and Public Affairs) | Richard Walters | May 2026 | November 7, 2026 |
| White House Deputy Chief of Staff (Legislative, Political and Public Affairs) | James Blair | January 20, 2025 | May 2026 |
| White House Deputy Chief of Staff (Communications and Personnel) | Taylor Budowich | January 20, 2025 | September 26, 2025 |
| White House Deputy Chief of Staff (Strategic Implementation) | Nick Luna | January 20, 2025 | August 2026 |
| White House Deputy Chief of Staff (Operations) | Beau Harrison | January 20, 2025 | |
Senior Advisors and Counselors to the President
| Counselor to the President | Alina Habba | January 20, 2025 | March 28, 2025 |
| Senior Counselor to the President | Peter Navarro | January 20, 2025 | |
| Senior Counselor to the President | Stanley Woodward | January 20, 2025 | November 14, 2025 |
| Senior Advisor to the President on Government Efficiency | Elon Musk | January 20, 2025 | May 30, 2025 |
| Senior Advisor to the President on Arab and Middle Eastern Affairs | Massad Boulos | January 20, 2025 | |
| Assistant to the President for Policy | Robert Gabriel Jr. | January 20, 2025 | May 23, 2025 |
| Assistant to the President | Beau Harrison | January 20, 2025 | |
| Special Assistant to the President for International Economic Relations | Emory Cox | January 20, 2025 | |
Office of Communications
| White House Communications Director | Steven Cheung | January 20, 2025 | |
Office of the Press Secretary
| White House Press Secretary | Katie Zacharia | October 12, 2026 | October 16, 2026 |
| White House Press Secretary | Karoline Leavitt | January 20, 2025 | August 27, 2026 |
Office of the First Lady
| Chief of Staff to the First Lady | Hayley Harrison | January 20, 2025 | |
White House Director of Legislative Affairs
| White House Director of Legislative Affairs | Katie Bailey | October 13, 2026 | |
| White House Director of Legislative Affairs | James Braid | January 20, 2025 | October 13, 2026 |
Office of Public Liaison
| Director of the Office of Public Liaison | Jim Goyer | January 20, 2025 | |
Office of Political Affairs
| Director of the Office of Political Affairs | Matt Brasseaux | January 20, 2025 | |
| Deputy Director of the Office of Political Affairs | Trevor Naglieri | February 19, 2025 | |
| Western Regional Political Director of the Office of Political Affairs | Christopher Escobedo | February 19, 2025 | |
| Southeast Regional Political Director of the Office of Political Affairs | Jon George | February 19, 2025 | |
| Midwest Regional Political Director of the Office of Political Affairs | Marshall Moreau | February 19, 2025 | |
| Northeast Regional Political Director of the Office of Political Affairs | Ashley Walukevich | February 19, 2025 | |
| Staff Assistant in the Office of Political Affairs | Samantha Feldman | February 19, 2025 | |
| Political Coordinator of the Office of Political Affairs | Jack Mahoney | February 19, 2025 | |
| Deputy Political Coordinator of the Office of Political Affairs | Trey Senecal | February 19, 2025 | |
Office of Intergovernmental Affairs
| Director of the Office of Intergovernmental Affairs | Alex Meyer | January 20, 2025 | June 5, 2026 |
| Deputy Director of the Office of Intergovernmental Affairs | Jared Borg | February 19, 2025 | |
| Deputy Director of the Office of Intergovernmental Affairs for Local and Tribal Governments | Christine Serrano Glassner | February 19, 2025 | |
| Associate Director in the Office of Intergovernmental Affairs | Connor Reardon | February 19, 2025 | |
| Associate Director in the Office of Intergovernmental Affairs | Chase Wilson | February 19, 2025 | |
| Associate Director in the Office of Intergovernmental Affairs | Michael Silvio | February 19, 2025 | |
| Associate Director in the Office of Intergovernmental Affairs | Sam Martinez | February 19, 2025 | |
| Deputy Associate Director in the Office of Intergovernmental Affairs | Hope Moreland | February 19, 2025 | |
| Coordinator in the Office of Intergovernmental Affairs | Finley Varughese | February 19, 2025 | |
| Staff Assistant in the Office of Intergovernmental Affairs | Elizabeth McAlindon | February 19, 2025 | |
Office of the White House Counsel
| White House Counsel | Will Scharf | September 1, 2026 | |
| White House Counsel | David Warrington | January 20, 2025 | September 1, 2026 |
Physician to the President
| Physician to the President | Sean Barbabella | March 7, 2025 | |
Presidential Personnel Office
| Director of Presidential Personnel Office | Dan Scavino | October 13, 2025 | |
| Director of Presidential Personnel Office | Sergio Gor | January 20, 2025 | October 13, 2025 |
National Economic Council
| Director of the National Economic Council | Kevin Hassett | January 20, 2025 | |
National Energy Council
| Chair of the National Energy Council | Doug Burgum | January 20, 2025 | |
Domestic Policy Council
| Director of the Domestic Policy Council | Vince Haley | January 20, 2025 | |
| Special Government Employee and Senior Advisor of the White House Faith Office | Paula White | February 7, 2025 | |
| Deputy Assistant to the President and Faith Director of the White House Faith Office | Jennifer S. Korn | February 7, 2025 | |
| Special Assistant to the President and Deputy Director of Faith Engagement | Jackson Lane | February 7, 2025 | |
National Security Council
| National Security Advisor | Marco Rubio | September 22, 2026 | |
| National Security Advisor | Marco Rubio | May 1, 2025 | September 22, 2026 |
| National Security Advisor | Michael Waltz | January 20, 2025 | May 1, 2025 |
| Deputy National Security Advisor | Michael Needham | May 20, 2026 | |
| Deputy National Security Advisor | Andy Baker | May 23, 2025 | |
| Deputy National Security Advisor | Robert Gabriel Jr. | May 23, 2025 | May 20, 2026 |
| Deputy National Security Advisor | Alex Nelson Wong | January 20, 2025 | May 1, 2025 |
Homeland Security Advisor
| Homeland Security Advisor | Stephen Miller | January 20, 2025 | November 9, 2026 |
| Homeland Security Advisor | Anthony Salisbury | November 12, 2026 | |
| Deputy Homeland Security Advisor | Anthony Salisbury | January 20, 2025 | |
| Senior Director on the National Security Council (Counterterrorism) | Sebastian Gorka | January 20, 2025 | |
Office of the Staff Secretary
| White House Staff Secretary | Ben Moss | September 2, 2026 | |
| White House Staff Secretary | Will Scharf | January 20, 2025 | September 1, 2026 |
| White House Staff Secretary | Council on Environmental Quality | | |
| Chair of the Council on Environmental Quality | Katherine Scarlett | September 18, 2025 (Confirmed* September 18, 2025, 51–44); *En bloc confirmation of 48 nominees. | |
| Chair of the Council on Environmental Quality | Katherine Scarlett | January 20, 2025 | September 18, 2025 |
Office of Science and Technology Policy
| Director of the Office of Science and Technology Policy | Michael Kratsios | March 25, 2025 (Confirmed March 25, 2025, 74–25) | |
| Director of the Office of Science and Technology Policy | Michael Kratsios | January 20, 2025 | March 25, 2025 |
| Executive Director of the President's Council of Advisors on Science and Technology | Lynne Parker | January 20, 2025 | |
| Associate Director of the Office of Science and Technology Policy | Ethan Klein | January 19, 2026 (Confirmed* December 18, 2025, 53–43); *En bloc confirmation of 97 nominees. | |
| Chair of the President's Council of Advisors on Science and Technology | David O. Sacks | January 20, 2025 | |
| Senior Policy Advisor for Artificial Intelligence | Sriram Krishnan | January 20, 2025 | |
President's Council of Advisers on Digital Assets
| Executive Director of the President's Council of Advisers on Digital Assets | Bo Hines | January 20, 2025 | August 9, 2025 |
President's Intelligence Advisory Board
| Chair of the President's Intelligence Advisory Board | Devin Nunes | January 20, 2025 | |
| Member of the President's Intelligence Advisory Board | Reince Priebus | February 11, 2025 | |
| Member of the President's Intelligence Advisory Board | Brad Wenstrup | February 11, 2025 | |
| Member of the President's Intelligence Advisory Board | Katie Miller | February 11, 2025 | May 30, 2025 |
| Member of the President's Intelligence Advisory Board | Robert C. O'Brien | February 11, 2025 | |
| Member of the President's Intelligence Advisory Board | Amaryllis Fox Kennedy | February 11, 2025 | |
| Member of the President's Intelligence Advisory Board | Thomas O. Hicks Jr. | February 11, 2025 | |
| Member of the President's Intelligence Advisory Board | Scott Glabe | February 11, 2025 | |
| Member of the President's Intelligence Advisory Board | Sander R. Gerber | February 11, 2025 | |
| Member of the President's Intelligence Advisory Board | Wayne Berman | February 11, 2025 | |
| Member of the President's Intelligence Advisory Board | Jeremy Katz | February 11, 2025 | |
| Member of the President's Intelligence Advisory Board | Joshua Lobel | February 11, 2025 | |
Council of Economic Advisers
| Chair of the Council of Economic Advisers | Christopher Phelan | August 10, 2026 (Confirmed* August 7, 2026, 51–47); *En bloc confirmation of 74 nominees. | |
| Chair of the Council of Economic Advisers | Pierre Yared | September 16, 2025 (Note: Miran has been on leave since September 16, 2025. Pierre Yared is serving as acting chair during Miran's leave.) | July 6, 2026 |
| Chair of the Council of Economic Advisers | Stephen Miran | March 13, 2025 (Confirmed March 12, 2025, 53–46) | February 3, 2026 |
Office of the National Cyber Director
| National Cyber Director | Sean Cairncross | August 4, 2025 (Confirmed August 2, 2025, 59-35 | November 19, 2026 |
Office of National Drug Control Policy
| Director of the Office of National Drug Control Policy | Sara Carter Bailey | January 9, 2026 (Confirmed January 6, 2026, 52–48) | |
Office of Management and Budget
| Director of the Office of Management and Budget | Russell Vought | February 7, 2025 (Confirmed February 6, 2025, 53–47) | |
| Director of the Office of Management and Budget | Matthew Vaeth | January 20, 2025 | February 7, 2025 |
| Deputy Director of the Office of Management and Budget | Hal Duncan | August 2026 (Confirmed* August 7, 2026, 51–47); *En bloc confirmation of 74 nominees. | |
| Deputy Director of the Office of Management and Budget | Dan Bishop | April 3, 2025 (Confirmed March 26, 2025, 53–45) | November 12, 2025 |
| Deputy Director of Management of the Office of Management and Budget | Eric Ueland | May 21, 2025 (Confirmed May 14, 2025, 52–45) | |
| Associate Director of the Office of Management and Budget for Intelligence and International Affairs | Amaryllis Fox Kennedy | February 11, 2025 | |
| General Counsel of the Office of Management and Budget | Mark Paoletta | January 20, 2025 | |
| Administrator of the Office of Information and Regulatory Affairs | Jeffrey Clark | March 5, 2025 | March 4, 2026 |
Office of Federal Procurement Policy
| Administrator for Federal Procurement Policy | Kevin Rhodes | October 15, 2025 (Confirmed* October 7, 2025, 51–47); *En bloc confirmation of 107 nominees. | |
Office of the United States Trade Representative
| Trade Representative | Jamieson Greer | February 27, 2025 (Confirmed February 26, 2025, 56–43) | |
| Trade Representative | Juan Millán | January 20, 2025 | February 27, 2025 |
| Deputy Trade Representative (Geneva Office) | Joseph Barloon | October 14, 2025 (Confirmed* October 7, 2025, 51–47); *En bloc confirmation of 107 nominees. | |
| Deputy Trade Representative (Asia, Textiles, Investment, Services, and Intellectual Property) | Bryan Switzer | September 19, 2025 (Confirmed* September 18, 2025, 51–44); *En bloc confirmation of 48 nominees. | |
| Deputy United States Trade Representative (Africa, Western Hemisphere, Europe, the Middle East, Environment, Labor, and Industrial Competitiveness | Jeffrey Goettman | December 2025 (Confirmed* December 18, 2025, 53–43); *En bloc confirmation of 97 nominees. | |
| Chief Agricultural Negotiator of Office of the United States Trade Representative | Julie Callahan | December 30, 2025 (Confirmed* December 18, 2025, 53–43); *En bloc confirmation of 97 nominees. | |
Council of Governors
| Co-Chair of the Council of Governors | Glenn Youngkin | February 19, 2025 | January 17, 2026 |
| Co-Chair of the Council of Governors | Henry McMaster | February 19, 2026 | |
| Co-Chair of the Council of Governors | Josh Stein | February 19, 2025 | |
| Member of the Council of Governors | Ron DeSantis | February 19, 2025 | |
| Member of the Council of Governors | Kathy Hochul | February 19, 2025 | |
| Member of the Council of Governors | Brian Kemp | February 19, 2025 | |
| Member of the Council of Governors | Jeff Landry | February 19, 2025 | |
| Member of the Council of Governors | Henry McMaster | February 19, 2025 | February 19, 2026 |
| Member of the Council of Governors | Wes Moore | February 19, 2025 | |
| Member of the Council of Governors | Josh Shapiro | February 19, 2025 | |
| Member of the Council of Governors | Gretchen Whitmer | February 19, 2025 | |
| Member of the Council of Governors | Jim Pillen | February 19, 2026 | |
Executive branch czars
| White House AI & Crypto Czar | David O. Sacks | January 20, 2025 | March 26, 2026 |
| White House AI Czar | Jay Clayton | January 20, 2025 | |
| White House Border Czar | Tom Homan | January 20, 2025 | |
| White House Drug Czar | Sara Carter Bailey | January 6, 2025 | |
| White House Energy Czar | Doug Burgum | January 20, 2025 | |
| White House Pardon Czar | Alice Marie Johnson | February 20, 2025 | |
Department of Government Efficiency
| Leader of the Department of Government Efficiency | Elon Musk | January 20, 2025 | May 30, 2025 |
| Leader of the Department of Government Efficiency | Steve Davis | February 5, 2025 | May 30, 2025 |
| Administrator of the Department of Government Efficiency | Amy Gleason | February 7, 2025 | July 4, 2026 |
| Chief of Staff of the Department of Government Efficiency | Brad Smith | February 5, 2025 | July 4 2026 |
| General Counsel of the Department of Government Efficiency | James Burnham | February 6, 2025 | July 4 2026 |
| General Counsel of the Department of Government Efficiency | Bill McGinley | January 20, 2025 | January 23, 2025 |
| Advisor and Spokesperson of the Department of Government Efficiency | Katie Miller | January 20, 2025 | May 30, 2025 |

== See also ==
- Executive Office appointments of the first Trump administration
