= White House Office =

Part of the Executive Office of the President of the United States

- The current White House logo for America 250

Agency overview
- Formed: 1857; 169 years ago
- Headquarters: West Wing of the White House
- Employees: 377
- Agency executive: Stephen Miller, White House Chief of Staff
- Parent agency: Executive Office of the President of the United States
- Website: White House Office

The White House Office is an entity within the Executive Office of the President of the United States (EOP). The White House Office is headed by the White House chief of staff, who is also the head of the Executive Office of the President. The staff work for and report directly to the president, including West Wing staff and the president's senior advisers. Almost all of the White House Office staff are political appointees of the president, do not require Senate confirmation and can be dismissed at the discretion of the president.

The staff of the various offices are based in the West Wing and East Wing of the White House, the Eisenhower Executive Office Building, and the New Executive Office Building. Senior staff, with high level, close contact with the president, have the title Assistant to the President. Second-level staff have the title Deputy Assistant to the President, and third-level staff have the title Special Assistant to the President. These aides oversee the political and policy interests of the president.

== History ==
The White House Office was established in the Executive Office of the President by Reorganization Plan 1 of 1939 and Executive Order 8248 to provide assistance to the president in the performance of activities incident to his immediate office. The White House Office is organized in accordance with the wishes of each incumbent president and is directed by staff chosen by the president. A staff authorization was initially established in 1978 (92 Stat. 2445). Some presidential boards, committees, and commissions function organizationally as subunits of the White House Office.

Although still a subunit of the EOP, the White House Office remains the center of the presidential staff system. In many ways it is closest to the president both in physical proximity, its top aides occupy most of the offices in the West Wing, and in its impact on the day-to-day operations, deliberations, policy agendas, and public communications of a presidency. During the transition to office and continuing throughout an administration, the president enjoys a great deal of discretion in terms of how the White House Office is organized.

== Mission ==
The issues that confront the United States at any one time cannot be dealt with by the president alone, and therefore the president draws on the expertise of others in the administration and even within an administration as one chief of staff may differ from a predecessor or successor.

While chiefs of staff may differ in the degree of policy advice they provide a president, they are the managers of the White House staff system. At least in theory, they are the coordinators bringing the pieces together; they are the tone-setters and disciplinarians making for good organizational order, and often act as the gatekeeper for the president, overseeing every person, document and communication that goes to the president.

== Organization ==
The White House Office under the administration of Donald J. Trump as of November 2026 is as follows.

=== Office of the Chief of Staff ===
- Assistant to the President and White House Chief of Staff: Stephen Miller
  - Deputy Assistant to the President & Director of the Office of the Chief of Staff: Alina Bulazel
  - Special Assistant to the President and Advisor for Policy Coordination: Rohit Roy
- Assistant to the President and White House Deputy Chief of Staff: Dan Scavino
- Assistant to the President and White House Deputy Chief of Staff for Policy: Caleb Orr
  - Special Assistant to the President and Senior Advisor for Policy for National Security: Kara Frederick
  - Special Assistant to the President and Senior Advisor for Policy for Economic Affairs: vacant
  - Special Assistant to the President and Senior Advisor for Policy for Domestic Policy: Clark Milner
- Assistant to the President and White House Deputy Chief of Staff for Legislative, Political and Public Affairs: Vacant
- Assistant to the President and White House Deputy Chief of Staff for Strategic Implementation: Vacant
- Assistant to the President and White House Deputy Chief of Staff for Operations: Beau Harrison

=== Senior advisors and Counselor to the President ===
- Assistant to the President & Special Envoy for Peace Missions: Steve Witkoff
- Assistant to the President & White House Border Czar: Tom Homan
- White House Energy Czar: Doug Burgum
  - Assistant to the President & Executive Director for the White House National Energy Dominance Council: Jarrod Agen
- White House Pardon Czar: Alice Marie Johnson
- Assistant to the President and Senior Counselor to the President for Trade and Manufacturing: Peter Navarro
- Senior Advisor to the President on Arab and Middle Eastern Affairs: Massad Boulos
- Special Assistant to the President and Communications Advisor: Margo Martin

=== Domestic Policy Council ===
- Assistant to the President for Domestic Policy and Director of the Domestic Policy Council: Vince Haley
- Deputy Assistant to the President for Domestic Policy: Heidi Overton
- Deputy Assistant to the President for Domestic Policy: Sam Adolphsen
  - Special Assistant to the President for Domestic Policy for Healthcare Policy: Theo Merkel
  - Special Assistant to the President for Domestic Policy for Law and Order, Veterans' Affairs, and Homelessness and Housing: Scott Centorino
  - Special Assistant to the President for Domestic Policy: Wells King
  - Special Assistant to the President for Domestic Policy: James Sherk
  - Special Assistant to the President for Domestic Policy for Education: Eric Bledsoe

==== White House Faith Office ====
- Deputy Assistant to the President and Faith Director of the White House Faith Office: Jennifer S. Korn
  - Special Assistant to the President and Deputy Director of Faith Engagement: Jackson Lane
  - Special Government Employee and Senior Advisor: Paula White-Cain

=== National Economic Council ===
- Assistant to the President for Economic Policy and Director of the National Economic Council: Kevin Hassett
- Deputy Assistant to the President for Economic Policy and Deputy Director of the National Economic Council: Robin Colwell
- Deputy Assistant to the President for Economic Policy and Deputy Director of the National Economic Council for International Economics: Nels Nordquist
  - Special Assistant to the President for International Economic Relations: Emory Cox
- Deputy Assistant to the President for Economic Policy and Deputy Director of the National Economic Council: Paige Willey
  - Special Assistant to the President for Economic Policy for Technology, Telecom, and Cybersecurity: Ryan Baasch
  - Special Assistant to the President for Economic Policy for Trade, Immigration, and Labor: Cale Clingenpeel
  - Special Assistant to the President for Economic Policy for Tax Policy: Andrew Lyon
  - Special Assistant to the President for Economic Policy for Financial Regulation and Banking: Jeff Wrasse
  - Special Assistant to the President for Economic Policy for Healthcare and Deregulation: Joel Zinberg

=== Office of Cabinet Affairs ===
- Assistant to the President and Cabinet Secretary: Lea Bardon
  - Associate Director of Policy: Thomas Bradbury
  - Associate Director for Agency Outreach: Cami Connor

=== Office of Communications ===
- Assistant to the President and White House Director of Communications: Steven Cheung
- Deputy Assistant to the President, Principal Deputy Communications Director & Head of Digital Strategy: Kaelan Dorr
- Special Assistant to the President and Assistant Communications Director for Special Projects: Dylan Johnson
- Special Assistant to the President and War Room Director: Ian Kelley
- Special Assistant to the President and Media Affairs Director: Sonny Joy Nelson
- White House Director of Research: Dan Boyle
- Cabinet Communications Director: Johanna Persing
- Congressional Communications Director: Charyssa Parent
- Policy Communications Director: Jacki Kotkiewicz
- Rapid Response Director: Jake Schneider

=== Office of the Press Secretary ===
- Assistant to the President and Press Secretary: Vacant
- Special Assistant to the President & Principal Deputy Press Secretary: Anna Kelly
- Special Assistant to the President & Senior Deputy Press Secretary: Lauren Bis
- Deputy Press Secretary: Taylor Rogers
- Assistant Press Secretary: Micah Stopperich
- Assistant Press Secretary: David Ingle
- Assistant Press Secretary: Allison Schuster
- Assistant Press Secretary: Olivia Wales
- Regional Press Secretary: Liz Huston

=== Office of Speechwriting ===
- Assistant to the President and Director of Speechwriting: Ross Worthington

=== Office of Digital Strategy ===
- Assistant to the President and Director of Digital Strategy: Vacant
  - Deputy Assistant to the President and Deputy Director of Digital Strategy: Vacant
  - Deputy Assistant to the President and Senior Advisor for Digital Strategy: Vacant
  - Director of Digital Engagement: Vacant

=== Office of the First Lady ===
- Assistant to the President & Chief of Staff to the First Lady: Hayley Harrison
  - Special Assistant to the President and Communications Director for the First Lady: Nick Clemens
- Deputy Assistant to the President and White House Social Secretary: Vacant

=== Office of Intergovernmental Affairs ===
- Deputy Assistant to the President and Director of the Office of Intergovernmental Affairs: Alex Meyer
- Special Assistant to the President and Deputy Director of the Office of Intergovernmental Affairs for State Governments: Jared Borg
- Special Assistant to the President and Deputy Director of the Office of Intergovernmental Affairs for Local and Tribal Governments: Christine Serrano Glassner
  - Associate Director: Connor Reardon
  - Associate Director: Chase Wilson
  - Associate Director: Michael Silvio
  - Associate Director: Sam Martinez
  - Deputy Associate Director: Hope Moreland
  - Coordinator: Finley Varughese
  - Staff Assistant: Elizabeth McAlindon

=== Office of Legislative Affairs ===
- Assistant to the President and Director of the Office of Legislative Affairs: Katie Bailey
- Deputy Assistant to the President and Deputy Director of the Office of Legislative Affairs and Internal Lead: Jay Fields
- Deputy Assistant to the President and Deputy Director of the Office of Legislative Affairs & House Lead: Jeff Freeland
  - Special Assistant to the President for the House of Representatives: Jordan Cox
  - Special Assistant to the President for the House of Representatives: Jack Rosemond
  - Special Assistant to the President for the House of Representatives: Stephen Siao
- Deputy Assistant to the President and Deputy Director of the Office of Legislative Affairs & Senate Lead: Pace McMullan
  - Special Assistant to the President for the Senate: Andrew (Drew) Dziedzic
  - Special Assistant to the President for the Senate: Taylor Lajoie
  - Special Assistant to the President for the Senate: Natalie McIntyre
  - Special Assistant to the President and Director of Confirmations: Vacant

=== Office of Management and Administration ===
- Assistant to the President and Director of Management and Administration and Director of the Office of Administration: Joshua Fisher
  - Special Assistant to the President and Chief of Staff for the Office of the Management and Administration: Vacant
- Special Assistant to the President and Deputy Director of Management and Administration: Vacant
  - White House Office of Personnel
    - Special Assistant to the President and Director of White House Personnel Office: Vacant
    - Special Assistant to the President and Director of Employee Engagement & Leadership Development: Vacant
    - Special Assistant to the President and Director of Finance: Vacant
- Special Assistant to the President and Deputy Director of Management and Administration: Vacant
  - Office of White House Operations
  - Office of White House Management
  - White House Visitors Office
    - Special Assistant to the President and Director of the White House Visitors Office: Vacant
  - White House Switchboard
- Special Assistant to the President and Director of Technology: Vacant
  - White House Office of Technology

=== Office of the National Security Advisor ===
- Assistant to the President for National Security Affairs and National Security Advisor: Marco Rubio
  - Special Assistant to the President and Senior Advisor: Micah Ketchell
  - Executive Secretary of the National Security Council: Catherine Keller
- Deputy Assistant to the President and Principal Deputy National Security Advisor: Andy Baker and Michael Needham
- Assistant to the President and Homeland Security Advisor: Anthony Salisbury
  - Deputy Homeland Security Advisor: Vacant
  - Deputy Assistant to the President and Senior Director for Counterterrorism: Sebastian Gorka
- Deputy National Security Advisor for Strategic Communications: Brian Hughes
- Deputy Assistant to the President and Deputy White House Counsel & Legal Advisor to the National Security Council: Vacant
  - Special Assistant to the President and Associate Counsel & Deputy Legal Advisor to the National Security Council: Vacant

=== Office of Pandemic Preparedness and Response Policy ===
- Assistant to the President and Director of Pandemic Preparedness and Response Policy: Vacant
  - Special Assistant to the President and Deputy Director of Pandemic Preparedness and Response Policy: Vacant
  - Special Assistant to the President and Senior Advisor for Domestic Preparedness: Vacant

=== Office of Political Affairs ===
- Deputy Assistant to the President and White House Political Director: Matt Brasseaux
- Special Assistant to the President and Deputy Director of the Office of Political Affairs: Trevor Naglieri
- Special Assistant to the President and Western Regional Political Director: Christopher Escobedo
- Special Assistant to the President and Southeast Regional Political Director: Jon George
- Special Assistant to the President and Midwest Regional Political Director: Marshall Moreau
- Special Assistant to the President and Northeast Regional Political Director: Ashley Walukevich
  - Staff Assistant: Samantha Feldman
  - Political Coordinator: Jack Mahoney
  - Political Coordinator: Trey Senecal

=== Office of Presidential Personnel ===
- Assistant to the President and Director of Presidential Personnel: Dan Scavino
- Deputy Assistant to the President and Deputy Director of Presidential Personnel: Trent Morse
  - Special Assistant to the President: Saurabh Sharma
  - Special Assistant to the President: Brand Kroeger

=== Office of Public Liaison ===
- Deputy Assistant to the President and Director of the Office of Public Liaison: Jim Goyer
- Special Assistant to the President and Deputy Director of the Office of Public Liaison: Brette Powell
  - Special Assistant to the President and Director of Business Outreach: Hailey Borden
  - Director of Strategic Initiatives: Alex Flemister
- Deputy Assistant to the President and Director of Minority Outreach: Lynne Patton
- Council on Women and Girls
- Office of Urban Affairs, Justice and Opportunity

=== Office of Scheduling and Advance ===
- Deputy Assistant to the President and Director of Presidential Scheduling: Marie Policastro
- Deputy Assistant to the President and Director of Presidential Advance: John Hiller

Director of Presidential Press Advance: Danny Tiso

- Special Assistant to the President and Trip Director: Chris Ambrosini
  - Director of White House Travel Office: Thomas Thorgersen

=== Office of the Staff Secretary ===
- Assistant to the President and Staff Secretary: Ben Moss
  - Chief of Staff for the Office of the Staff Secretary: Vacant
- Deputy Assistant to the President and Deputy Staff Secretary: Dan Burrows

==== Office of Presidential Correspondence ====
- Special Assistant to the President and Director of Presidential Correspondence: Vacant
  - Deputy Director of Presidential Correspondence: Vacant
    - Director of Presidential Correspondence Management: Vacant
    - Director of Special Projects for Presidential Correspondence: Vacant
  - Deputy Director of Presidential Correspondence for Writing: Vacant
    - Senior Presidential Writer: Vacant

==== Office of the Executive Clerk ====
- Executive Clerk: David E. Kalbaugh
  - Deputy Executive Clerk: Edwin Thomas
  - Assistant Executive Clerk: Brian Pate

==== Office of Records Management ====
- Director of Records Management: Philip Droege
  - Deputy Director and Senior Advisor for Records Management: Paul S. Raizk
    - Supervisor for Records Management: Mary Brooke
    - Supervisor for Records Management: Kittle Evenson
    - Supervisor for Records Management: Vy Hoang
    - Supervisor for Records Management: Elizabeth Varghese
    - Senior Records Management Analyst: Rebekah Denz
    - Senior Records Management Analyst: Abby Gipe
    - Senior Records Management Analyst: Taeshonda King

=== Office of the White House Counsel ===
- Assistant to the President and Counsel to the President: Will Scharf
  - Special Assistant to the President and Chief of Staff to the Office of White House Counsel & Senior Counsel: Vacant
  - Deputy Assistant to the President and Spokesperson for the White House Counsel: Vacant
- Deputy Assistant to the President and Deputy Counsel & Legal Advisor to the NSC: Vacant

=== Oval Office Operations ===
- Assistant to the President and Director of Oval Office Operations: Walt Nauta
  - Special Assistant to the President and Deputy Director of Oval Office Operations: Chamberlain Harris
  - Confidential Aide to the President: Natalie Harp
  - Special Assistant to the President and Personal Aide to the President: Christopher Ambrosini

=== White House Fellows ===
- Director of the President's Commission on White House Fellowships: Mary Sprowls

=== White House Military Office ===
- Deputy Assistant to the President and Director of the White House Military Office: Vacant
  - Special Assistant to the President and Deputy Director of the White House Military Office for Operations: Vacant
  - White House Communications Agency (Joint Services Unit)
  - 89th Airlift Wing (United States Air Force)
  - White House Medical Unit (United States Navy)
    - Deputy Assistant and Physician to the President: Sean Barbabella
  - Camp David (United States Navy and United States Marine Corps)
  - Marine Helicopter Squadron One (United States Marine Corps)
  - White House Mess or Presidential Food Service (United States Navy)
  - White House Transportation Agency (United States Army)
  - General Counsel

=== Department of Government Efficiency ===
- Administrator of the Department of Government Efficiency: Amy Gleason (acting)

== See also ==
- Presidential task force
