= Katie Wiles =

American lobbyist

- Occupation: Lobbyist
- Employer: Continental Strategy
- Title: Partner; director of the Washington, D.C. office
- Parent: Susie Wiles (mother)

Katie Wiles is an American lobbyist and partner at Continental Strategy, a political strategy firm.

== Career ==
=== Continental Strategy ===
A day after president-elect Trump appointed Katie's mother Susie Wiles his White House chief of staff, Katie was promoted to director of the Washington, D.C. lobbying and consulting offices at Continental Strategy.

In October 2026, the Financial Times published a report that Continental Strategy received a $35,000 monthly contract to represent Republika Srpska, a pro-Russian political entity in Bosnia and Herzegovina. Wiles subsequently traveled to Republika Srpska in August 2026, and was photographed holding a rifle with Željko Budimir, the interior minister of Republika Srpska. Continental Strategy claimed Wiles had visited the entity in association with a different contract.

In September 2026, Suzie Wiles met with Željka Cvijanović, the Serb member of Bosnia and Herzegovina, and former president of Republika Srpska.

The article followed previous reports about the Trump Administration's relationship with Republika Srpska, after The New York Times reported that James Blair and Chris LaCivita, who lead the 2026 congressional campaign operation for Trump, had consulted for Republika Srpska.

== Personal life ==
Kate is the daughter of current White House Chief of Staff Susie Wiles.
