= Executive Office appointments by Donald Trump =

Executive Office appointments by Donald Trump may refer to:

- Executive Office appointments of the first Trump administration
- Executive Office appointments of the second Trump administration
