= Dennis Cheng =

American development executive

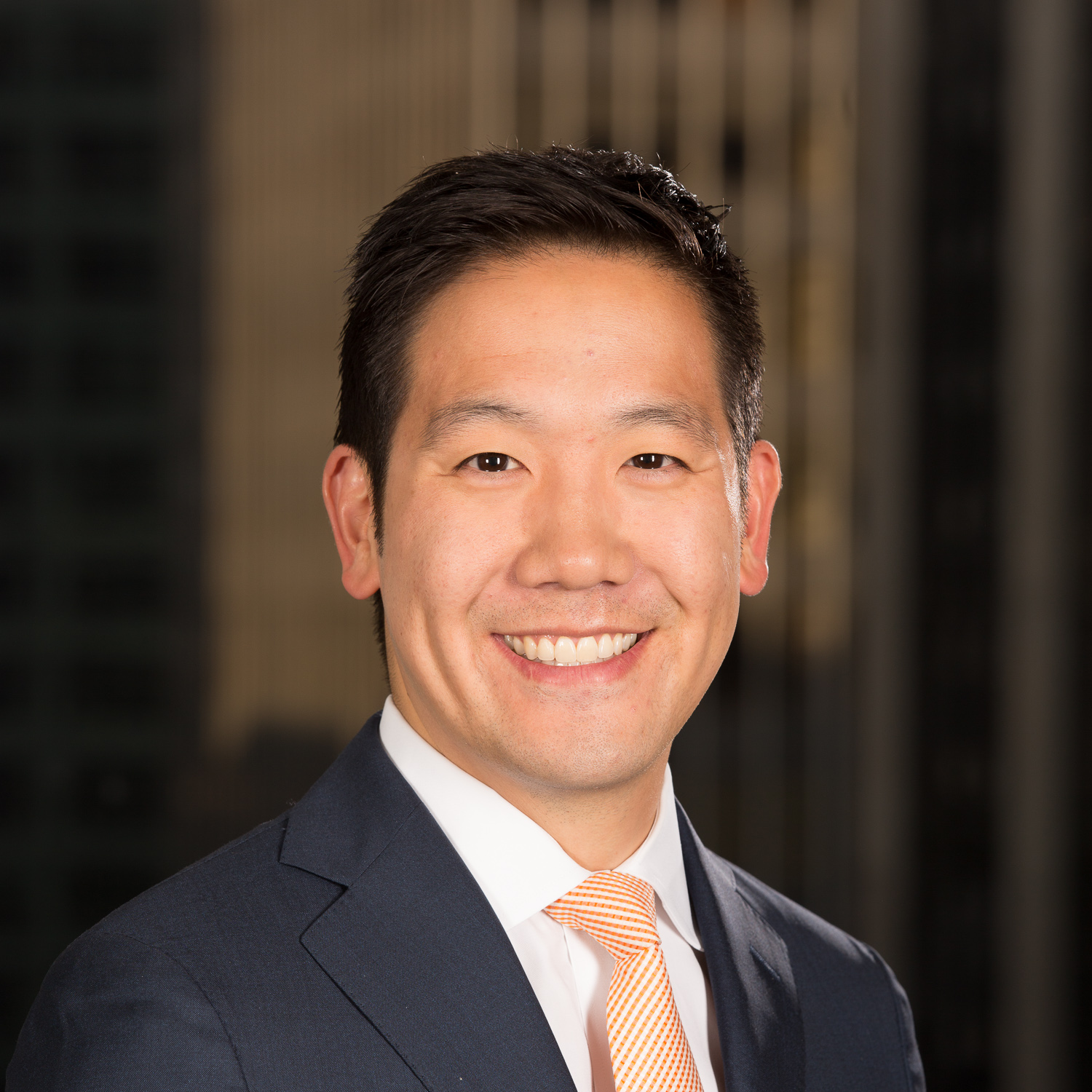

Deputy Director of the White House Office of Political Strategy and Outreach
- In office November 2023 – January 20, 2025
- President: Joe Biden
- Leader: Emmy Ruiz
- Preceded by: Alana Mounce

Deputy Chief of Protocol of the United States
- In office July 2009 – July 2011
- President: Barack Obama
- Leader: Capricia Marshall

Personal details
- Education: Swarthmore College (BA); London School of Economics (MSc)

Dennis Cheng is an American development executive. He served as the chief development officer of the Clinton Foundation from 2011 to 2015. He served as the national finance director of the 2016 presidential campaign of Hillary Clinton and senior advisor of external outreach for the Joe Biden 2020 presidential campaign.

== Education ==
Cheng graduated with a Bachelor of Arts degree in political science and economics from Swarthmore College in 2001. He received a Master of Science (M.Sc.) in international relations from the London School of Economics (LSE).

== Career ==
Cheng served as the Deputy Chief of Protocol of the United States from July 20, 2009 to July 2011.

Cheng has since 2008 acted in important roles for Hillary Clinton. He served as New York state finance director for the 2008 Hillary Clinton presidential campaign. He also served on campaigns for John Kerry, Andrew Cuomo, and Wesley Clark. During the Clinton-led State Department he was deputy chief of protocol. He joined the Clinton Foundation in 2011 as chief development officer in 2011 and is credited with raising $248 million until 2015.

In 2015, Cheng became the national finance director of Hillary Clinton's presidential campaign. His role in the campaign is to direct fundraising activity and serve as a close aide to Hillary Clinton with major donors describing Cheng's presence as "often as close as you get to talking to Hillary Clinton". Cheng spent the summer of 2016 taking Clinton from fundraiser to fundraiser in the richest zipcodes across the United States, including Beverly Hills, California, the Silicon Valley, Cape Cod and The Hamptons. According to Cheng more than 1,500 fundraisers were hosted and raised $972 million for Clinton's campaign, the DNC and state parties. Clinton attended almost 400 of those fundraisers and donations were made by more than 3 million people.

In May 2017, Hillary Clinton hired Cheng for the launch of her new political action organization Onward Together.

Cheng joined the Joe Biden 2020 presidential campaign as senior advisor for external outreach.

In May 2021, it was announced that Cheng would executive produce "Recipe for Change" for YouTube alongside LeBron James, Maverick Carter, Michelle Kwan, Jamal Henderson and Philip Byron. The special, set to air June 16, 2021 and produced by the SpringHill Company, will bring together Asian American celebrities, chefs, activists, and creators to celebrate API culture and discuss the recent and historic acts of hate and violence against the API community. "Recipe for Change" was nominated for "Outstanding Daytime Special" at the 49th Daytime Creative Arts & Lifestyle Emmy Awards.

Cheng is currently a senior advisor to The Asian American Foundation and a board member of The American LGBTQ+ Museum.

In November 2023 Cheng joined the Biden Administration as the Deputy Director of the White House Office of Political Strategy and Outreach.

It was announced in May 2025 that Cheng was appointed to the bipartisan congressional Commission to Study the Potential Creation of a National Museum of Asian Pacific American History and Culture.
