= National Museum of Asian Pacific American History and Culture =

A National Museum of Asian Pacific American History and Culture is a proposed museum on Asian Pacific American history and culture, to be part of the Smithsonian Institution. An expert commission to study the proposal—the Commission to Study the Potential Creation of a National Museum of Asian Pacific American History and Culture—was created in 2022 by act of Congress.

== Proposals ==
H.R. 3525, the Commission To Study the Potential Creation of a National Museum of Asian Pacific American History and Culture Act, was introduced to the U.S. House of Representatives by Representative Grace Meng in 2021. The bill established an expert commission and tasked it with making "recommendations for a plan of action for the establishment and maintenance of a National Museum of Asian Pacific American History and Culture" in Washington, D.C. The bill passed the House by a voice vote and the Senate by unanimous consent, and was signed into law by President Joe Biden on June 13, 2022, becoming Public Law No. 117-140.

The Commission consists of eight members, with two each being appointed by the Senate majority leader, Senate minority leaders, speaker of the House, and House minority leader.

The passage of the study commission followed the opening of the Smithsonian's National Museum of the American Indian and National Museum of African American History and Culture (in 2016) and the planning phases for construction of the National Museum of the American Latino and Smithsonian American Women's History Museum.

In September 2022, an independent nonprofit, Friends of the National Asian Pacific American Museum, organized to raise funds and help guide content and support for the Commission. The organization convened a 30+ member Task Force representing museums, experts, and academics from a wide range of disciplines and ethno-centric subgroups of Asian Americans.

On June 12, 2025, the ceremonial swearing-in of the Commission to Study the Potential Creation of a National Museum of Asian Pacific American History and Culture was held at the Members Room of the Library of Congress. The Commissioners sworn in were Dr. Jay Xu, Chiling Tong, Joanne Kwong, Tina Wei Smith, Dennis Cheng, The Hon. Rodney Davis, Kevin D. Kim, and the Hon. Michelle Steel. The Executive Director of the Commission is Krystal Ka'ai Hetherington.

== See also ==
- Smithsonian Asian Pacific American Center
