= Emmy Ruiz =

American political advisor

White House Director of Political Strategy and Outreach
- In office January 20, 2021 – January 20, 2025
- President: Joe Biden
- Deputy: Dennis Cheng
- Preceded by: Brian Jack (Political Affairs)
- Succeeded by: Matt Brasseaux

Personal details
- Born: 1983 or 1984 (age 42–43) Harlingen, Texas, U.S.
- Party: Democratic
- Education: University of Texas at San Antonio (BA)

Emmy Ruiz (born 1983/1984) is an American political advisor who served as the White House director of political strategy and outreach for President Joe Biden.

== Early life and education ==
Ruiz was born in Harlingen, Texas and raised in La Feria, Texas. She earned a Bachelor of Arts degree in English language and literature from the University of Texas at San Antonio.

== Career ==
After graduating from college, Ruiz worked as a grant writer for the American Red Cross. After meeting Hillary Clinton at a Red Cross event in 2008, she applied to work as a field organizer in Las Vegas for the Hillary Clinton 2008 presidential campaign during the 2008 Nevada Democratic presidential caucuses. During her time with the Clinton campaign, Ruiz became associated with the "Mook Mafia," a group of campaign staffers led by Robby Mook.

Ruiz was the Nevada general election director for the Barack Obama 2012 presidential campaign and managed Hillary Clinton 2016 presidential campaign efforts in Nevada, Ohio, and Colorado. In February 2019, Ruiz became a partner at NEWCO Strategies, a strategic consulting firm. During the 2020 Presidential primary, Ruiz served as a senior advisor for the Kamala Harris primary campaign. On January 5, 2021, it was announced that Ruiz would serve as White House Director of Political Strategy and Outreach in the incoming Biden administration, succeeding Brian Jack, who was the White House Director of Political Affairs. On September 23, 2022, Ruiz was elevated to be an assistant to the president. She is one of the key political advisors to the President remaining in Washington as the 2024 campaign staffs up.

Political offices
Preceded by Brian Jack as White House Director of Political Affairs	White House Director of Political Strategy and Outreach; 2021–2025	Succeeded by Matt Brasseaux
