= Richard Walters (political advisor) =

American political advisor (born 1990)

Acting White House Deputy Chief of Staff for Legislative, Political and Public Affairs
- In office May 2026 – November 7, 2026
- President: Donald Trump
- Preceded by: James Blair

Personal details
- Born: June 28, 1989 (age 37)
- Party: Republican
- Education: University of Mississippi (BA)

Richard Walters (born June 28, 1989) is an American political advisor who served as the White House deputy chief of staff for legislative, political and public affairs from May to November 2026.

== Early life and education ==
Richard Walters was born on June 28, 1989. Walters attended Northwest Rankin High School in Flowood, Mississippi. In his senior year, he assisted in sending baskets of food to Mississippi-born soldiers who were deployed in the wars in Iraq and Afghanistan. Walters was the vice president of the Teenage Republicans organization for Mississippi. He attended the University of Mississippi. Walters is Catholic.

== Career ==
=== Republican National Committee (2013–2025) ===
Walters began working for the Republican National Committee in 2013 as a financial official. By August 2017, he had become the finance director of the committee. That month, Walters was named as the Republican National Committee's acting chief of staff after Sara Armstrong's resignation. His work involved managing the committee's budget and personnel, including investments in its operations. In February 2020, ProPublica reported that Walters had established a company, Red Wave Strategies, in December 2018; the company was used to obscure his salary, which exceeded that of officials at the Democratic National Committee and his superiors. Amid an outbreak of COVID-19 at the White House, Walters tested positive for the virus in November 2020.

In February 2022, Walters resigned as the Republican National Committee's chief of staff, though he remained at the committee as a full-time employee to advise chairwoman Ronna McDaniel; according to Politico, Walters intended to leave the committee after the 2020 presidential election, but assisted in helping his eventual successor, Mike Reed, transition to the position. He was the longest-serving chief of staff in the committee's history. Walters was investigated by the House Select Committee to Investigate the January 6th Attack on the United States Capitol. He advised Donald Trump's presidential campaign for the 2024 election and served as the executive director of the committee for Trump's second inauguration.

=== Further political work (2025–2026) ===
In March 2025, Walters became a partner at the public relations firm FGS Global. In May, The Wall Street Journal reported that Walters was among several political advisors who had founded American Growth Partnership, an executive network closely associated with Trump. That month, he was named to the board of directors of the Congressional Leadership Fund. According to The New York Times, he was also named to the Committee for the Preservation of the White House that year. In January 2026, Walters became a fellow at the Georgetown Institute of Politics and Public Service.

== White House Deputy Chief of Staff (May–November 2026) ==
In May 2026, Axios reported that Walters had been named to succeed James Blair as the White House deputy chief of staff for legislative, political and public affairs. Walters resigned on November 7.
