= Trevor Naglieri =

Trevor J. Naglieri is an American bureaucrat who has served in the Trump administration since 2025.

== Early life and education ==
Naglieri is from Peabody, Massachusetts. He is a 2015 graduate of Franklin Pierce University.

== Career ==
In 2015, Naglieri worked for the presidential campaign of Jeb Bush. After Bush dropped out of the race, he joined the presidential campaign of Ted Cruz.

In March 2023, Trump named Naglieri as his campaign's New Hampshire state director. Following Trump's win in the 2024 New Hampshire primary, Naglieri moved to a position with the Republican National Committee, eventually supporting the Trump campaign.

In January 2025, Naglieri was named Special Assistant to the President and deputy director of the Office of Political Affairs at the White House.
