= Alex Meyer (American politician) =

Alex Meyer is an American Republican political operative. He served in the second Trump administration as a Deputy Assistant to the President.

== Early life and education ==
Meyer graduated from the University of Mississippi in 2015.

== Career ==
From 2017 to 2019, Meyer worked in various roles at the Republican National Committee. He went on to work directly on Republican Congressional campaigns and worked as a political strategist. Meyer worked on Donald Trump's 2024 campaign as the Deputy Political Director.

From February 2025 to April 2026, Meyer served as the Director of the White House Office of Intergovernmental Affairs. In April 2026, Meyer announced he would leave his role at the White House, reportedly to advise Trump's political committee ahead of the 2026 midterm elections.
