= Matt Brasseaux =

American political consultant (born 1990)

White House Director of Political Affairs
- Incumbent
- Assumed office January 20, 2025
- President: Donald Trump
- Preceded by: Emmy Ruiz (Political Strategy and Outreach)

Personal details
- Born: Matthew Ryan Brasseaux; August 28, 1990 (age 36) Wichita Falls, Texas, U.S.
- Party: Republican
- Education: Midwestern State University (BBA)

Matthew Ryan Brasseaux (born August 28, 1990) is an American political consultant who has served as the White House political director since 2025.

== Early life and education ==
Matthew Ryan Brasseaux was born on August 28, 1990, in Wichita Falls, Texas. Brasseaux attended Wichita Falls High School, where he played baseball. He graduated from the Dillard College of Business Administration at Midwestern State University in December 2012.

== Career ==
=== Public consulting and Republican National Committee (2013–2022) ===
By September 2013, Brasseaux had begun to work for Dean International, a consulting company. He represented Texas Central Railway as it sought to construct high-speed rail through Bryan, Texas. He later became a staffer at the Republican National Committee.

=== Lombardo and Trump campaigns (2022–2024) ===
By 2023, Brasseaux had become the campaign manager for Clark County sheriff Joe Lombardo's campaign in the 2022 Nevada gubernatorial election. By February 2024, he had become the Republican National Committee's regional director for the Western United States. Brasseaux managed Donald Trump's 2024 presidential campaign in Arizona and Nevada and served as his deputy political director by November 2024.

== White House Political Director (2025–present) ==
On November 25, 2024, Trump named Brasseaux as his White House political director. As White House political director, Brasseaux was involved in the Trump administration's recruiting efforts for the 2026 elections. In October 2025, he joined vice president JD Vance and deputy chief of staff for legislative, political, and public affairs James Blair in Indiana to encourage the state to redistrict.

== Works cited ==
=== Articles ===
- "Bryan Council Asked To Support High Speed Rail". WTAW. September 11, 2013. Archived from the original on August 17, 2019.
- Cook, Nancy (November 25, 2024). "Trump Picks Vance Aide James Braid to Run Legislative Affairs". Bloomberg News.
- "Corrigan council asked to join infrastructure group". Polk County Enterprise. July 20, 2014.
- Demissie, Hannah (July 22, 2025). "What Trump and the White House are planning for the midterms". ABC News.
- Frazier, Kierra (November 25, 2024). "Trump adds senior Vance aide and 2 others to White House team". Politico.
- Gilani, Haajrah (November 26, 2024). "Former campaign manager for Nevada governor to join Trump administration". Las Vegas Sun.
- Gersony, Laura (February 5, 2024). "As presidential campaign heats up, who has the strongest ground game in Arizona so far?". The Arizona Republic.
- "Midwestern State University December Graduates". Times Record News. December 26, 2012.
- Samuels, Brett (November 25, 2024). "Trump names Vance aide as legislative affairs director". The Hill.
- "WFHS Coyotes". Times Record News. February 17, 2008.
- Wren, Adam (October 8, 2025). "Vance heads to Indiana after Republicans warn White House of stalled redistricting push". Politico.

=== Documents ===
- "Matthew Ryan Brasseaux in the Texas, U.S., Birth Index, 1903-1997" (Document). Birth Index.

Political offices
Preceded by Emmy Ruiz as White House Director of Political Strategy and Outreach	White House Director of Political Affairs; 2025–present	Incumbent
