= Christopher Escobedo =

American political operative

Christopher M. Escobedo is an American political operative who has served in the Trump administration since 2025.

== Early life and education ==
Escobedo graduated from Arizona State University.

== Career ==
From 2021 to 2024, Escobedo served as state director for the Arizona Republican Party.

In February 2025, Escobedo was appointed to the White House as a Special Assistant to the President and Western Regional Political Director in the Office of Political Affairs. His 2025 financial disclosure listed financial assets of less than $1 million.
