= Council of Governors =

Group of US state and federal officials

The Council of Governors is a United States council of state and federal officials that was established to "advise the Secretary of Defense, the Secretary of Homeland Security, and the White House Homeland Security Council on matters related to the National Guard and civil support missions" and to "strengthen further the partnership between the Federal Government and State Governments to protect [the United States] against all types of hazards". The Council is tasked to review "such matters as involving the National Guard of the various States; homeland defense; civil support; synchronization and integration of State and Federal military activities in the United States; and other matters of mutual interest pertaining to National Guard, homeland defense, and civil support activities."

The Council was authorized prior to 2008 and required by the National Defense Authorization Act for Fiscal Year 2008, enacted by the 110th Congress and signed by President George W. Bush on January 28, 2008. It was officially established by Executive Order 13528, issued by President Barack Obama on January 11, 2010.

== Composition ==
The Council of Governors is composed of 10 members, selected by the President for a term of 2 years from among the governors of the several states and territories of the United States and the Mayor of the District of Columbia. No more than five members may be from the same political party.

Two members of the Council, of different political parties, are designated by the President to serve as Co-Chairs of the Council.

The work of the Council is coordinated by an Executive Director designated by the Secretary of Defense.

=== Members ===
| Member | Party | Tenure begun | State | FEMA region | Notes | References |
|---|---|---|---|---|---|---|
| Josh Stein | Democratic | February 19, 2025 | North Carolina | IV | Co-Chair | |
| Henry McMaster | Republican | February 19, 2025 | South Carolina | IV | Co-Chair | |
| Ron DeSantis | Republican | February 19, 2025 | Florida | IV | | |
| Kathy Hochul | Democratic | February 19, 2025 | New York | II | | |
| Brian Kemp | Republican | February 19, 2025 | Georgia | IV | | |
| Jeff Landry | Republican | February 19, 2025 | Louisiana | VI | | |
| Wes Moore | Democratic | February 19, 2025 | Maryland | III | | |
| Josh Shapiro | Democratic | February 19, 2025 | Pennsylvania | III | | |
| Gretchen Whitmer | Democratic | July 8, 2021 | Michigan | V | Reappointed February 19, 2025 | |
| Jim Pillen | Republican | February 20, 2026 | Nebraska | VII | | |

==== Former members ====
| Member | Party | Tenure begun | Tenure ended | State | FEMA region | Notes | References |
|---|---|---|---|---|---|---|---|
| Mike DeWine | Republican | February 22, 2019 | February 19, 2025 | Ohio | V | Co-Chair; Reappointed July 8, 2021 | |
| Tim Walz | Democratic-Farmer-Labor | February 22, 2019 | February 19, 2025 | Minnesota | V | Co-Chair; Reappointed July 8, 2021 | |
| Bill Lee | Republican | August 14, 2020 | February 19, 2025 | Tennessee | IV | | |
| John Bel Edwards | Democratic | July 8, 2021 | February 19, 2025 | Louisiana | VI | Previously served on Council from 2017 to 2019 | |
| John Carney | Democratic | July 8, 2021 | February 19, 2025 | Delaware | III | | |
| Kate Brown | Democratic | July 8, 2021 | February 19, 2025 | Oregon | X | | |
| Spencer Cox | Republican | July 8, 2021 | February 19, 2025 | Utah | VIII | | |
| Phil Scott | Republican | July 8, 2021 | February 19, 2025 | Vermont | I | | |
| Mark Gordon | Republican | July 8, 2021 | February 19, 2025 | Wyoming | VIII | | |
| Jim Douglas | Republican | February 4, 2010 | January 6, 2011 | Vermont | I | Co-Chair | |
| Jay Nixon | Democratic | February 4, 2010 | January 9, 2017 | Missouri | VII | | |
| Terry Branstad | Republican | March 9, 2011 | May 24, 2017 | Iowa | VII | Co-Chair | |
| Mike Rounds | Republican | February 4, 2010 | January 8, 2011 | South Dakota | VIII | | |
| Brad Henry | Democratic | February 4, 2010 | January 10, 2011 | Oklahoma | VI | | |
| Luis Fortuño | NPP/Republican | February 4, 2010 | January 2, 2013 | Puerto Rico | II | | |
| Bev Perdue | Democratic | February 4, 2010 | January 5, 2013 | North Carolina | IV | | |
| Christine Gregoire | Democratic | February 4, 2010 | January 16, 2013 | Washington | X | Co-Chair | |
| Neil Abercrombie | Democratic | March 9, 2011 | December 1, 2014 | Hawaii | IX | | |
| Jan Brewer | Republican | February 4, 2010 | January 5, 2015 | Arizona | IX | | |
| Pat Quinn | Democratic | February 21, 2013 | January 12, 2015 | Illinois | V | | |
| Martin O'Malley | Democratic | February 4, 2010 | January 21, 2015 | Maryland | III | Co-Chair | |
| Matt Mead | Republican | March 9, 2011 | May 1, 2017 | Wyoming | VIII | | |
| Brian Sandoval | Republican | February 21, 2013 | May 1, 2017 | Nevada | IX | | |
| Terry McAuliffe | Democratic | February 24, 2015 | May 1, 2017 | Virginia | III | | |
| Rick Snyder | Republican | February 24, 2015 | May 1, 2017 | Michigan | V | | |
| Eric Greitens | Republican | May 1, 2017 | June 1, 2018 | Missouri | VII | | |
| Bill Walker | Independent | May 1, 2017 | December 3, 2018 | Alaska | X | | |
| Mark Dayton | Democratic-Farmer-Labor | February 24, 2015 | January 7, 2019 | Minnesota | V | | |
| Rick Scott | Republican | May 1, 2017 | January 8, 2019 | Florida | IV | | |
| Dannel Malloy | Democratic | February 4, 2010 | January 9, 2019 | Connecticut | I | Co-Chair | |
| Steve Bullock | Democratic | February 24, 2015 | January 4, 2021 | Montana | VIII | | |
| Mary Fallin | Republican | May 1, 2017 | January 14, 2019 | Oklahoma | VI | Co-Chair | |
| Bill Haslam | Republican | 2014 | January 19, 2019 | Tennessee | IV | | |
| Charlie Baker | Republican | 2016 | February 22, 2019 | Massachusetts | I | | |
| Doug Ducey | Republican | February 22, 2019 | July 7, 2021 | Arizona | IX | | |
| Asa Hutchinson | Republican | July 12, 2018 | July 7, 2021 | Arkansas | VI | | |
| David Ige | Democratic | February 22, 2019 | July 7, 2021 | Hawaii | IX | | |
| Ned Lamont | Democratic | February 22, 2019 | July 7, 2021 | Connecticut | I | | |
| Mike Parson | Republican | February 22, 2019 | July 7, 2021 | Missouri | VII | | |
| JB Pritzker | Democratic | February 22, 2019 | July 7, 2021 | Illinois | V | | |
| Pete Ricketts | Republican | February 22, 2019 | July 7, 2021 | Nebraska | VII | | |
| Glenn Youngkin | Republican | February 19, 2025 | January 17, 2026 | Virginia | III | Co-Chair | |

=== Federal officials ===
| Position | Member | |
|---|---|---|
| USNORTHCOM Commander | | General Terrence J. O'Shaughnessy |
| Commandant of the United States Coast Guard | | Admiral Karl L. Schultz |
| Chief of the National Guard Bureau | framless | General Joseph L. Lengyel |

== Scope of activities ==
Topics for review by the Council of Governors include synchronization and integration of state and federal military activities and other matters related to state National Guard organizations, homeland defense, and civil support.

== Meetings ==
Meetings of the Council are called by the Secretary of Defense or the Co-Chairs.

The inaugural meeting was held on February 23, 2010, in Washington, D.C., at the Pentagon. A second meeting was held July 11, 2010 in Boston, Massachusetts. A third meeting was scheduled for November 2010.
