= Jennifer S. Korn =

American government official

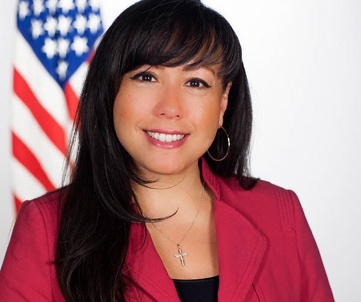

Deputy Assistant to the President and Faith Director of the White House Faith Office
- Incumbent
- Assumed office February 7, 2025
- President: Donald Trump

Personal details
- Born: Los Angeles, California, U.S.

Jennifer S. Korn is a United States government official currently serving as deputy assistant to the president and Faith Director of the White House Faith Office.

== Early life ==
Korn was born in East Los Angeles, California.

== Career ==
Korn led Hispanic outreach for the George W. Bush 2004 presidential campaign and served as director of Hispanic and Women's affairs during his second term. She worked as deputy political director for the Republican National Committee before joining the first Trump administration as deputy director for the Office of Public Liaison. She was appointed to the White House Faith Office on February 7, 2025.
