= Jackson Lane =

American government official

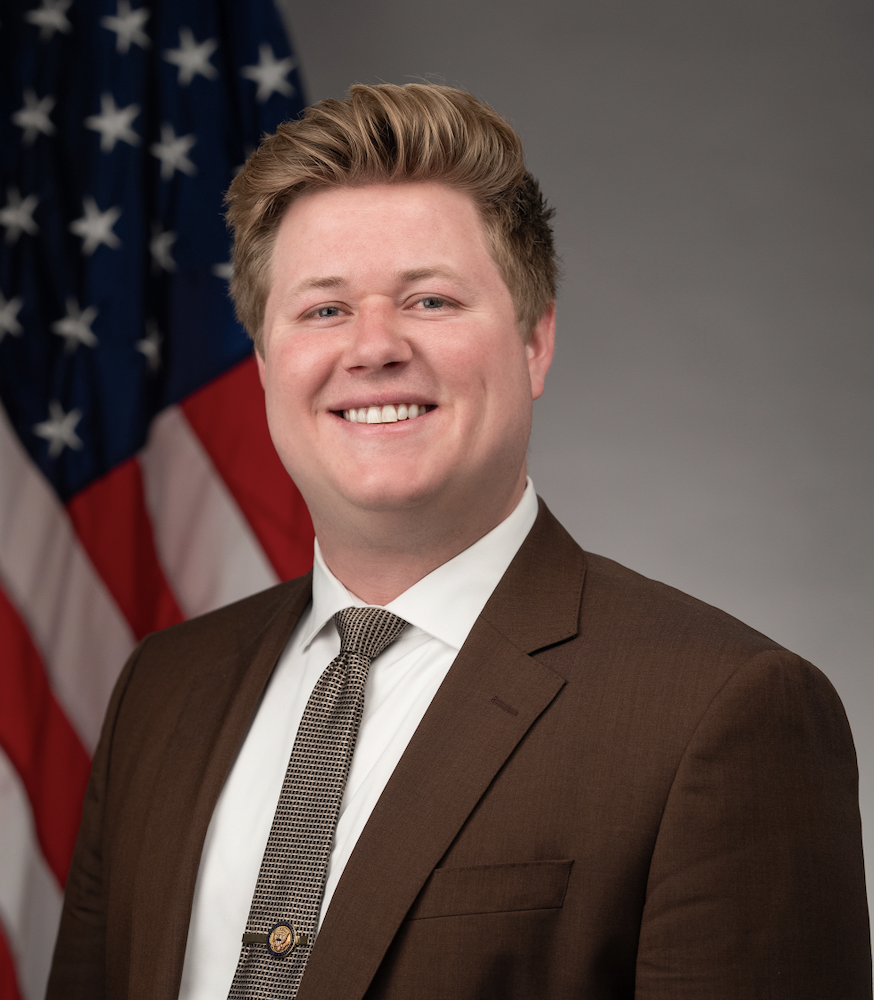

Special Assistant to the President for Domestic Policy
- Incumbent
- Assumed office February 7, 2025
- President: Donald Trump

Personal details
- Born: January 12, 1998 (age 28)
- Education: Missouri Baptist University

Jackson Lane is a United States government official who has served as a Special Assistant to the President and Deputy Director for the White House Faith Office since February 7, 2025. He is currently serving as a Special Assistant to the President for Domestic Policy.

== Career ==
Lane attended Missouri Baptist University and began working on political campaigns in 2016.

From 2021 to 2023, he served as executive assistant to Lt. General Michael Flynn (Ret.), while simultaneously leading faith-based mobilization efforts with the American Renewal Project.

In February 2025, he was appointed Special Assistant to the President and Deputy Director for the White House Faith Office. He is currently serving as a Special Assistant to the President for Domestic Policy.
