= Emory Cox =

American government official (born 1995)

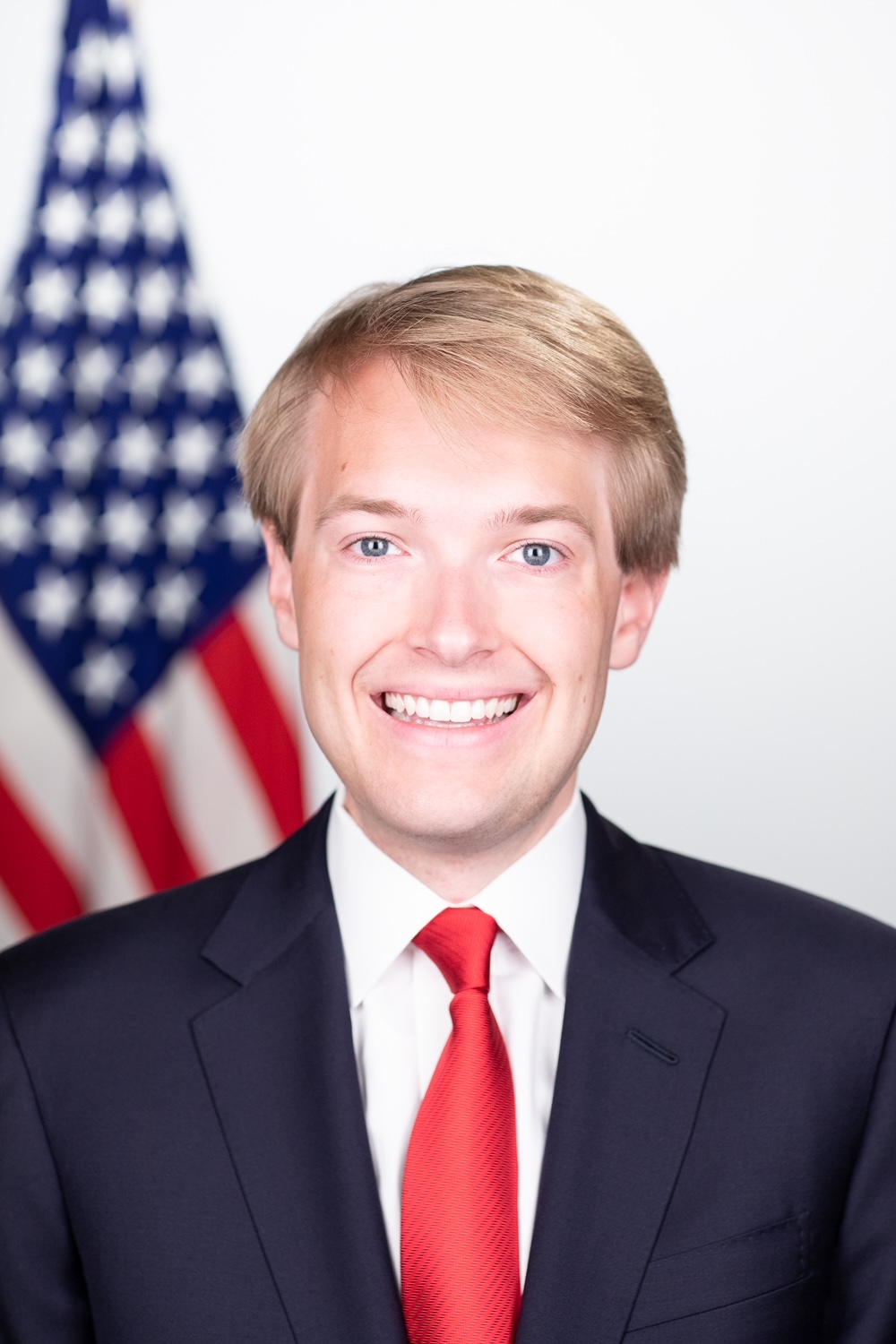
- Official portrait, 2025

Special Assistant to the President for International Economic Relations
- Incumbent
- Assumed office January 20, 2025
- President: Donald Trump

Personal details
- Born: December 24, 1995 (age 30)
- Education: Washington and Lee University (BA)

Emory Cox (born December 24, 1995) is a United States government official currently serving as special assistant to the president for international economic relations.

== Early life and education ==
Cox was born in Pell City, Alabama, to Annette Cox and Metro Bank founder Ray Cox. He was raised by his mother after the death of his father and attended the Altamont School in Birmingham. In 2018, he graduated from Washington and Lee University, where he chaired the College Republicans club.

== Career ==
Cox interned for United States congressman Mike Rogers while in high school and went on to intern for Alabama politicians Bill Armistead, Robert J. Bentley, John Merrill, and Luther Strange as well as senator Jeff Sessions.

During the first Trump administration, Cox worked as a White House intern. He later served as a senior economic advisor to senator Tommy Tuberville. In January 2025, he was named special assistant to the president for international economic relations.
