= White House Political Director =

Senior presidential appointee

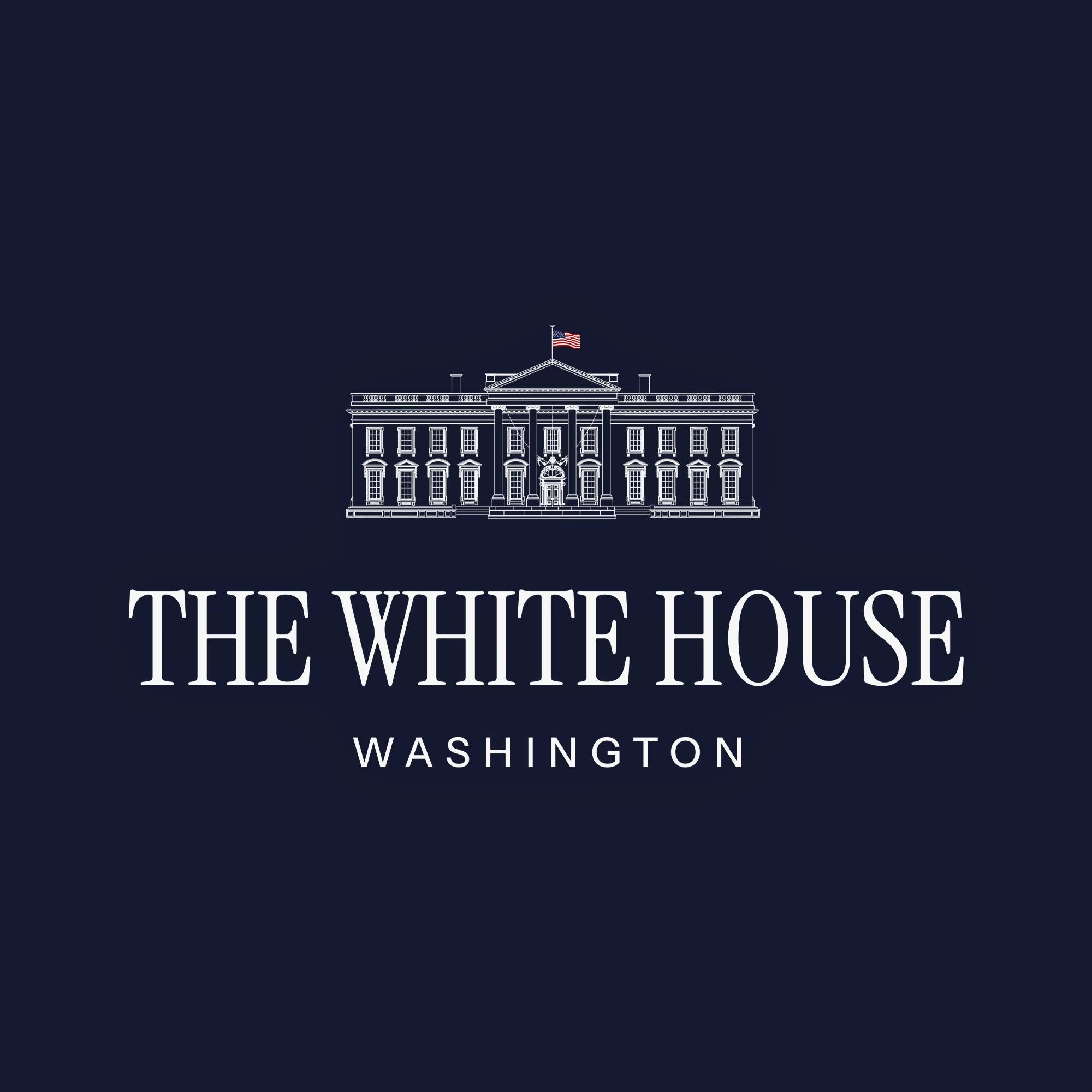
- Incumbent; Matt Brasseaux since January 20, 2025
- Executive Office of the President; White House Office
- Appointer: President of the United States
- Formation: 1978 (informally); 1981 (formally)
- First holder: Tim Kraft (informally); Lyn Nofziger (formally)

The White House political director, formally the director of the Office of Political Affairs (OPA) or Office of Political Strategy and Outreach (OPSO), is a political appointee of the president of the United States and a senior member of the Executive Office of the President of the United States.

== History ==
The White House Office of Political Affairs was first formally established in 1981 during under Ronald Reagan, while Jimmy Carter was the first to designate a political director in 1978.

Subsequent administrations have rebranded the office. During his second term, President Obama renamed the office as the Office of Political Strategy and Outreach, though the roles and responsibilities of the office and its director remained.

== List ==
Denotes acting capacity.

Image	Name	Start	End	President
	Tim Kraft	April 28, 1978	August 10, 1979	Jimmy Carter (1977–1981)
	Sarah Weddington	August 10, 1979	January 20, 1981	Jimmy Carter (1977–1981)
	Lyn Nofziger	January 20, 1981	January 22, 1982	Ronald Reagan (1981–1989)
	Ed Rollins	January 22, 1982	October 1983	Ronald Reagan (1981–1989)
	Margaret Tutwiler; Acting	July 23, 1984	February 5, 1985	Ronald Reagan (1981–1989)
	Bill Lacy	April 5, 1985	June 17, 1986	Ronald Reagan (1981–1989)
	Haley Barbour	June 17, 1986	March 16, 1987	Ronald Reagan (1981–1989)
	Frank Lavin	March 16, 1987	January 20, 1989	Ronald Reagan (1981–1989)
	James Wray	January 20, 1989	June 1, 1990	George H. W. Bush (1989–1993)
	David Carney	June 1, 1990	March 5, 1991	George H. W. Bush (1989–1993)
	David Carney	March 5, 1991	January 1992	George H. W. Bush (1989–1993)
	Ron Kaufman	January 1992	August 24, 1992	George H. W. Bush (1989–1993)
	Janet Mullins	August 24, 1992	January 20, 1993	George H. W. Bush (1989–1993)
	Rahm Emanuel	January 20, 1993	June 23, 1993	Bill Clinton (1993–2001)
	Joan Baggett	June 23, 1993	December 1994	Bill Clinton (1993–2001)
	Joe Velasquez; Acting	December 1994	February 16, 1995	Bill Clinton (1993–2001)
	Doug Sosnik	February 16, 1995	February 7, 1997	Bill Clinton (1993–2001)
	Craig Smith	February 7, 1997	February 5, 1999	Bill Clinton (1993–2001)
	Minyon Moore	February 5, 1999	January 20, 2001	Bill Clinton (1993–2001)
	Ken Mehlman	January 20, 2001	May 23, 2003	George W. Bush (2001–2009)
	Matt Schlapp	May 23, 2003	February 2005	George W. Bush (2001–2009)
	Sara Taylor	February 2005	May 31, 2007	George W. Bush (2001–2009)
	Jonathan Felts	May 31, 2007	January 20, 2009	George W. Bush (2001–2009)
	Patrick Gaspard	January 20, 2009	February 1, 2011	Barack Obama (2009–2017)
Vacant		February 1, 2011	January 24, 2014	Barack Obama (2009–2017)
	David Simas	January 24, 2014	December 19, 2016	Barack Obama (2009–2017)
	Bill Stepien	January 20, 2017	December 7, 2018	Donald Trump (2017–2021)
	Brian Jack	February 2, 2019	January 20, 2021	Donald Trump (2017–2021)
	Emmy Ruiz	January 20, 2021	January 20, 2025	Joe Biden (2021–2025)
	Matt Brasseaux	January 20, 2025	Incumbent	Donald Trump (2025–present)

=== Political and Intergovernmental Affairs ===
During the second term of the Reagan administration, there was a director of political and intergovernmental affairs who sat above the political director and intergovernmental affairs director.

Image	Name	Start	End	President
	Ed Rollins	February 5, 1985	October 1, 1985	Ronald Reagan (1981–1989)
	Mitch Daniels	October 1, 1985	March 1, 1987	Ronald Reagan (1981–1989)
	Frank Donatelli	March 1, 1987	January 20, 1989	Ronald Reagan (1981–1989)

== In popular culture ==
Paulo Costanzo portrays Lyor Boone, the fictional White House Political Director, in Designated Survivor, a political thriller television series.
