= James Blair (political advisor) =

American political consultant (born 1989)

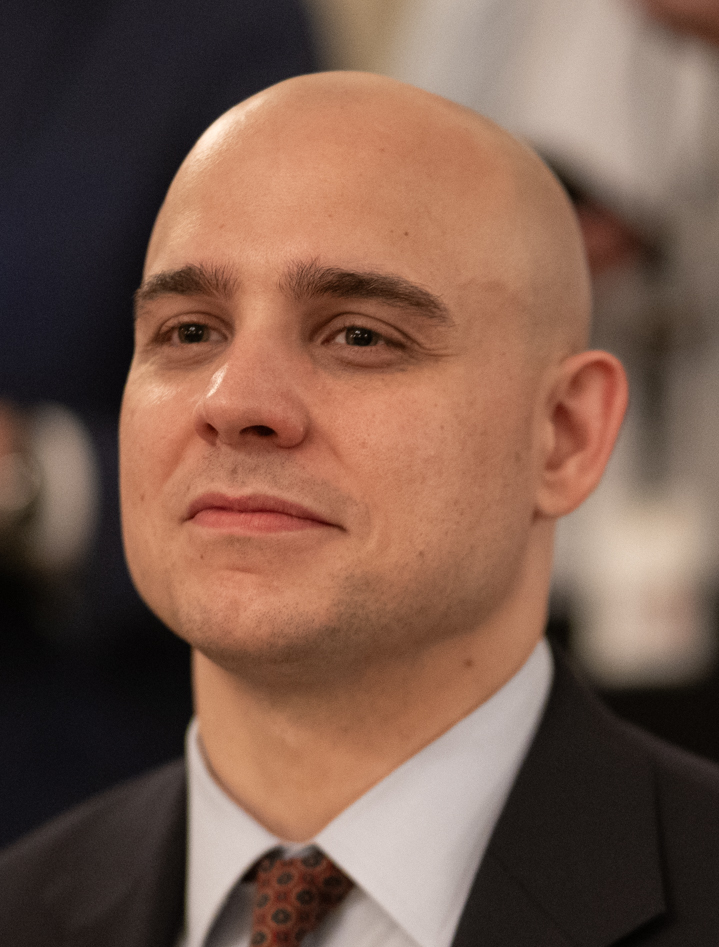
- Blair in 2025

White House Deputy Chief of Staff for Legislative, Political and Public Affairs
- In office January 20, 2025 – May 2026
- President: Donald Trump
- Preceded by: Position established
- Succeeded by: Richard Walters

Personal details
- Born: Michael James Blair; May 21, 1989 (age 37)
- Education: Florida State University (BS)

Michael James Blair (born May 21, 1989) is an American political consultant who served as the White House deputy chief of staff for legislative, political and public affairs from 2025 to 2026.

Blair graduated from Florida State University with a bachelor's degree in finance. In 2013, he founded Rapid Loop Consulting, a political consulting firm. Blair's political work was largely concentrated within Florida, working within the state's Republican Party and serving as an assistant to Richard Corcoran, the speaker of the Florida House of Representatives. He helped lead Corcoran's unmaterialized campaign for the 2018 Florida gubernatorial election and later became involved with Ron DeSantis's campaign. Blair served as DeSantis's deputy chief of staff until his resignation in August 2019. He worked for several political campaigns, including for Donald Trump's 2020 presidential campaign in Florida.

In March 2024, Blair was appointed the political director of Trump's 2024 presidential campaign. That month, Michael Whatley, the chair of the Republican National Committee, announced that Blair would serve as the committee's political director. In November, Trump named Blair as his White House deputy chief of staff for legislative, political and public affairs. He announced a leave of absence from his position to manage Trump's political operation for the 2026 elections in April 2026.

== Early life and education ==
Michael James Blair was born on May 21, 1989. Blair graduated from Gaither High School in 2007 and from Florida State University with a bachelor's degree in finance.

== Career ==
=== Consulting work (2013–2022) ===
In 2013, Blair founded Rapid Loop Consulting, a political consulting firm. He divested from the firm after the 2024 presidential election, according to the company's president. In 2015, Blair became involved in the Florida Republican Party. According to Politico, the party had spent—and reimbursed—over US$800,000 through his personal charge card. In 2016, he became an assistant to Richard Corcoran, the then-designate speaker of the Florida House of Representatives. In August 2016, Corcoran appointed Blair to lead external affairs within his office.

In September 2018, Blair was named to the board of Enterprise Florida. Blair helped lead Corcoran's initial, unmaterialized campaign for the 2018 Florida gubernatorial election.

In October 2018, he became involved with Ron DeSantis's campaign in the gubernatorial election as a senior advisor. After DeSantis's victory, Blair advised him on policy. He served as DeSantis's deputy chief of staff until his resignation in August 2019. Blair was pushed out of the DeSantis administration as DeSantis's wife Casey and other state Republicans conflicted with Wiles. Blair led Melissa Nelson's re-election effort as the state attorney for Florida's fourth judicial circuit, and worked for Donald Trump's 2020 presidential campaign in Florida.

In June 2021, Blair became a spokesman for Anna Paulina Luna. In July 2021, the conservative commentator Tudor Dixon hired Blair to help her campaign in the 2022 Michigan gubernatorial election as her lead strategist. He registered the domain name for Saving Arizona PAC, a political action committee in support of Blake Masters in the 2022 Senate election in Arizona. With Andy Surabian, Blair lead a political action committee to challenge representative Liz Cheney's re-election campaign. Concurrently, Blair worked on Luna and Cory Mills's campaigns. With Andy Surabian, he led a political action committee, American Leadership PAC, to advance representative Jim Banks's policies.

=== Trump campaign and Republican National Committee (2022–2024) ===
In March 2024, Blair was appointed the political director of Trump's 2024 presidential campaign. That month, Michael Whatley, the chair of the Republican National Committee, announced that Blair would served as the committee's political director; he was involved in the drafting of the committee's platform that year. Among Blair's initial responsibilities included using information gathered from working in the DeSantis administration against the governor. Blair focused on attracting low and mid-propensity voters, apolitical men, and African Americans. He coordinated a voter outreach effort intended to be run at a lower cost than the US$130 million spent on the field operation for Trump's 2020 campaign. He signed data sharing agreements with Turning Point Action and America First Works to facilitate canvassing.

== White House Deputy Chief of Staff (2025–present) ==
In November 2024, The Washington Post reported that Blair was expected to be named as a White House deputy chief of staff. On November 13, Trump named Blair as his deputy chief of staff for legislative, political and public affairs. In February 2025, Politico described him as an opponent of Elon Musk's work within the federal government. With Russell Vought, the director of the Office of Management and Budget, and James Braid, the White House director of legislative affairs, he participated in budget talks with Congress in May. Blair presented Trump with plans to redraw congressional maps to favor Republicans in April, beginning a mid-decade redistricting cycle. His strategy towards Congress was described by The Wall Street Journal as aggressive; according to the Journal, outgoing Georgia representative Marjorie Taylor Greene described Blair and his associates as "dismissive" towards her. Blair reportedly discouraged New York representative Mike Lawler from running for governor in the 2026 election and Michigan representative Bill Huizenga for running in the 2026 Senate election.

Blair has additionally managed the Trump administration's strategy for the broader 2026 elections. In April 2026, Trump announced that Blair would take a temporary leave of absence from his position to manage Trump's political operation for the midterms. He is set to be succeeded by Richard Walters.

== Views ==
Blair has described himself as "pretty far to the right", according to The Wall Street Journal.

== Works cited ==
=== Articles ===
- Booker, Brakkton (April 20, 2024). "Trump has a rocky relationship with Black voters. He's trying to change it". Politico.
- Browning, Kellen; Oreskes, Benjamin; Medina, Eduardo (November 1, 2024). "Trump Is Courting Apolitical Young Men. Will It Pay Off?". The New York Times. Archived from the original on November 1, 2024.
- Buzzacco-Foerster, Jenna (August 23, 2016). "Richard Corcoran updates House members on leadership, staffing changes". Florida Politics.
- Cameron, Chris (March 14, 2024). "New R.N.C. Chair Declares 'a United Front' With Trump After Sweeping Changes". The New York Times. Archived from the original on March 15, 2024.
- Cai, Sophia (December 27, 2025). "'Brilliant James': How James Blair took Washington by storm". Politico.
- Caputo, Marc (June 17, 2021). "In secret recording, Florida Republican threatens to send Russian-Ukrainian 'hit squad' after rival". Politico.
- "Congrats Class of 2007!". St. Petersburg Times. May 18, 2007.
- Dawsey, Josh (November 12, 2024). "Donald Trump is expected to announce that James Blair, Taylor Budowich, Dan Scavino and Stephen Miller are all going to be deputy chiefs of staff, per people familiar with the plan who spoke on the condition on anonymity to share personnel decisions that haven't been announced publicly". The Washington Post.
- Dawsey, Josh (December 24, 2025). "Trump's Enforcer Is Little-Known White House Aide With Enormous Influence". The Wall Street Journal.
- Dixon, Matt (April 14, 2016). "After state GOP reforms, one staffer fronts big-money expenses". Politico.
- Dixon, Matt (August 26, 2019). "Former VA official 'hand-picked' by Trump to lead Florida GOP". Politico.
- Fineout, Gary (August 1, 2022). "Florida Republicans tether themselves to DeSantis — even without his support". Politico.
- Gancarski, A.G. (November 13, 2024). "James Blair, Taylor Budowich continue Florida influx into Donald Trump's senior staff". Florida Politics.
- Goldmacher, Shane; Haberman, Maggie; Swan, Jonathan (November 7, 2024). "How Trump Won, and How Harris Lost". The New York Times. Archived from the original on November 7, 2024.
- Hauserman, Julie (December 17, 2018). "Gov.-elect Ron DeSantis's inner circle". Florida Phoenix.
- Isenstadt, Alex (September 10, 2021). "Trump aides flock to Cheney challenger's campaign". Politico.
- "James Blair named to Enterprise Florida board". Florida Politics. September 24, 2018.
- "James Blair says he's out as Ron DeSantis' deputy chief of staff". Florida Politics. August 16, 2019.
- Lizza, Ryan; Palmeri, Tara; Daniels, Eugene; Bade, Rachael (July 2, 2021). "What do Tucker Carlson and J.D. Vance have in common?". Politico.
- Mahoney, Emily (November 15, 2018). "Machine recount confirms: Ron DeSantis is Florida's next governor". Tampa Bay Times. Archived from the original on November 16, 2018.
- Markay, Lachlan (July 26, 2021). "A political bogeyman of Silicon Valley". Axios. Archived from the original on September 26, 2024.
- Messerly, Megan; Allison, Natalie; Schneider, Elena (September 30, 2024). "Republicans are starting to raise alarms about Trump's ground game". Politico.
- Messerly, Megan; Cancryn, Adam (May 22, 2025). "Trump's hands-off megabill strategy to face test in Senate". Politico.
- Montellaro, Zach (July 26, 2022). "The GOP's messiest primary". Politico.
- "Ron DeSantis transition team announces first round of staff hires". Florida Politics. November 13, 2018.
- Schleifer, Theodore (August 14, 2024). "Trump Gambles on Outside Groups to Finance Voter Outreach Efforts". The New York Times. Archived from the original on August 14, 2024.
- Stokols, Eli (May 1, 2026). "Former RNC official Richard Walters joining White House for midterm push". Politico.
- Swan, Jonathan (November 17, 2022). "New super PAC forms as Jim Banks eyes House GOP leadership role". Axios. Archived from the original on October 17, 2022.
- Swan, Jonathan; Goldmacher, Shane; Haberman, Maggie (July 18, 2024). "How Trump Dominated His Own Party on a New G.O.P. Platform". The New York Times. Archived from the original on July 18, 2024.
- Traylor, Jake; Burns, Dasha (February 28, 2025). "What 130-day cap? Musk is 'here to stay' in the Trump admin, adviser says". Politico.
- "Trump appoints 4 campaign advisers to new White House positions". PBS. November 13, 2024.
- Vogel, Kenneth; Barker, Kim; Méheut, Constant; Schwirtz, Michael (January 12, 2025). "Pardoned by Trump, Manafort Is Back and Looking for Foreign Work". The New York Times. Archived from the original on January 12, 2025.
- Wilson, Drew (October 16, 2018). "All hands on deck: Ron DeSantis campaign staffs up for final sprint". Florida Politics.
- Wilson, Drew (February 5, 2020). "Melissa Nelson launches State Attorney reelection campaign". Florida Politics.
- Wren, Adam; Gangitano, Alex; Burns, Dasha (April 10, 2026). "James Blair to temporarily depart White House for Trump's political operation". Politico.

=== Documents ===
- "Michael James Blair in the Florida, U.S., Voter Registration Records, 1942-2023" (Document). Voter Registration Records.
