= Nuclear holocaust =

Potential result of major nuclear war

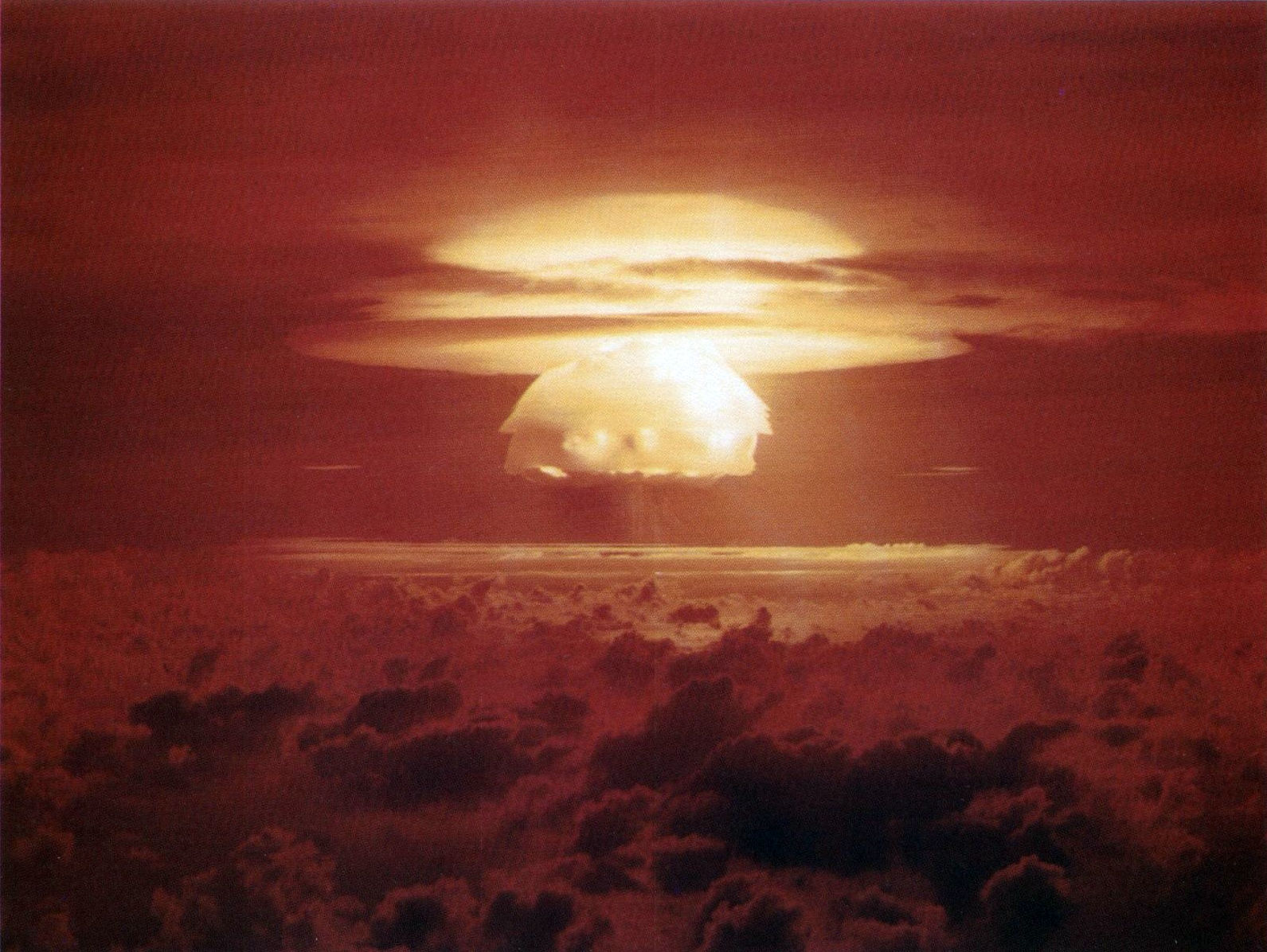
Mushroom cloud from the 1954 explosion of Castle Bravo, the largest nuclear weapon detonated by the U.S.

A nuclear holocaust, also known as a nuclear apocalypse, nuclear annihilation, nuclear armageddon, or atomic holocaust, is a theoretical scenario where the mass detonation of nuclear weapons causes widespread destruction and radioactive fallout, with global consequences. Such a scenario envisages large parts of the Earth becoming uninhabitable due to the effects of nuclear warfare, potentially causing the collapse of civilization, the extinction of humanity, or the termination of most biological life on Earth.

Besides the immediate destruction of cities by nuclear blasts, the potential aftermath of a nuclear war could involve firestorms, a nuclear winter, widespread radiation sickness from fallout, and/or the temporary (if not permanent) loss of much modern technology due to electromagnetic pulses. Some scientists, such as Alan Robock, have speculated that a thermonuclear war could result in the end of modern civilization on Earth, in part due to a long-lasting nuclear winter. According to modern climate models, the average temperature of Earth following a full thermonuclear war would fall for several years by 7 to 8 °C (13 to 15 degrees Fahrenheit) on average.

Early Cold War-era studies suggested that billions of humans would survive the immediate effects of nuclear blasts and radiation following a global thermonuclear war. The International Physicians for the Prevention of Nuclear War believe that nuclear war could indirectly contribute to human extinction via secondary effects, including environmental consequences, societal breakdown, and economic collapse.

The threat of a nuclear holocaust plays an important role in the anti-nuclear movement and the development of popular perception of nuclear weapons. It features in the security concept of mutually assured destruction (MAD) and is a common scenario in survivalism. Nuclear holocaust is a common feature in literature and film, especially in speculative genres such as science fiction, dystopian and post-apocalyptic fiction.

== Etymology and usage ==
The English word "holocaust", derived from the Greek term "holokaustos" meaning "completely burnt", refers to great destruction and loss of life, especially by fire.

One early use of the word "holocaust" to describe an imagined nuclear destruction appears in Reginald Glossop's 1926 novel The Orphan of Space: "Moscow ... beneath them ... a crash like a crack of Doom! The echoes of this Holocaust rumbled and rolled ... a distinct smell of sulphur ... atomic destruction." In the novel, an atomic weapon is planted in the office of the Soviet dictator, who, with German help and Chinese mercenaries, is preparing the takeover of Western Europe.

More broadly, the use of nuclear weapons, particularly their testing, has been discussed as genocide, ecocide, environmental racism, nuclear imperialism, and colonialism by anti-nuclear activists.

== Likelihood of nuclear war ==
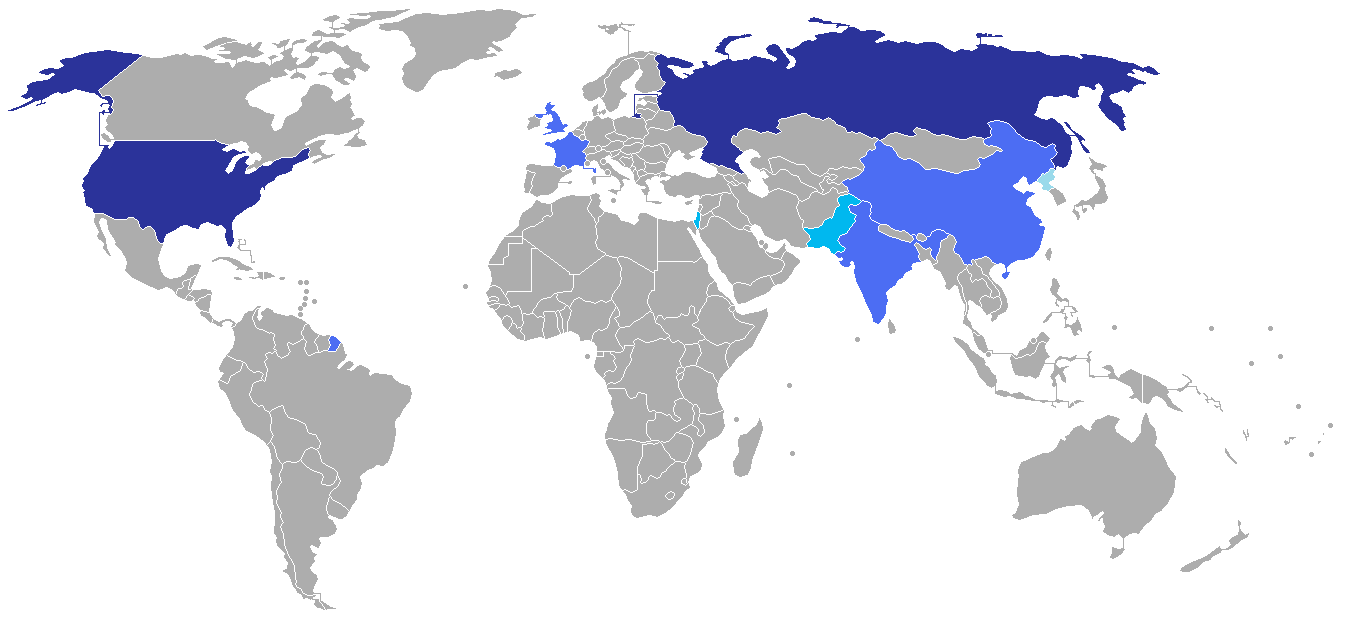
Large stockpile with global range (dark blue), smaller stockpile with global range (medium blue), small stockpile with regional range (light blue)

As of 2026, humanity has about 12,200 nuclear weapons, thousands of which are on hair-trigger alert. While stockpiles have been on the decline following the end of the Cold War, every nuclear country is currently undergoing modernization of its nuclear arsenal. The Bulletin advanced their symbolic Doomsday Clock in 2015, citing among other factors "a nuclear arms race resulting from modernization of huge arsenals". In January 2020, it was moved forward to 100 seconds before midnight. In 2023, it was moved forward to 90 seconds before midnight. In 2025, it was moved to 89 seconds before midnight. In January 2026, the clock moved to 85 seconds before midnight.

John F. Kennedy estimated the probability of the Cuban Missile Crisis escalating to nuclear conflict as between 33% and 50%.

In a poll of experts at the Global Catastrophic Risk Conference in Oxford (17–20 July 2008), the Future of Humanity Institute estimated the probability of complete human extinction by nuclear weapons at 1% within the century, the probability of 1 billion dead at 10% and the probability of 1 million dead at 30%. These results reflect the median opinions of a group of experts, rather than a probabilistic model; the actual values may be much lower or higher.

Scientists have argued that even a small-scale nuclear war between two countries, such as India and Pakistan, could have devastating global consequences and such local conflicts are more likely than full-scale nuclear war.

== Moral importance of human extinction risk ==
In his book Reasons and Persons, philosopher Derek Parfit posed the following question:

Compare three outcomes:

1. Peace.
2. A nuclear war that kills 99% of the world's existing population.
3. A nuclear war that kills 100%.

(2) would be worse than (1), and (3) would be worse than (2). Which is the greater of these two differences?

He continues that "Most people believe that the greater difference is between (1) and (2). I believe that the difference between (2) and (3) is very much greater." Thus, he argues, even if it would be bad if massive numbers of humans died, human extinction would itself be much worse because it prevents the existence of all future generations. And given the magnitude of the calamity were the human race to become extinct, Nick Bostrom argues that there is an overwhelming moral imperative to reduce even small risks of human extinction.

== Likelihood of complete human extinction ==
The United States and Soviet Union nuclear stockpiles, in total number of nuclear bombs/warheads in existence throughout the Cold War and post-Cold War era

Many scholars have posited that a global thermonuclear war with Cold War-era stockpiles, or even with the current smaller stockpiles, may lead to human extinction. This position was bolstered when nuclear winter was first conceptualized and modelled in 1983. However, models from the past decade consider total extinction very unlikely, and suggest parts of the world would remain habitable. Technically the risk may not be zero, as the climatic effects of nuclear war are uncertain and could theoretically be larger, but also smaller, than current models suggest. There could also be indirect risks, such as a societal collapse following nuclear war that can make humanity much more vulnerable to other existential threats.

A related area of inquiry is: if a future nuclear arms race someday leads to larger stockpiles or more dangerous nuclear weapons than existed at the height of the Cold War, at what point could war with such weapons result in human extinction? Physicist Leo Szilard warned in the 1950s that a deliberate doomsday device could be constructed by surrounding powerful hydrogen bombs with a massive amount of cobalt-60. Cobalt-60 has a half-life of five years, and its global fallout might, some physicists have posited, be able to clear out all human life via lethal radiation intensity. The main motivation for building a cobalt bomb in this scenario is its reduced expense compared with the arsenals possessed by superpowers; such a doomsday device does not need to be launched before detonation and thus does not require expensive missile delivery systems, and the hydrogen bombs do not need to be miniaturized for delivery via missile. The system for triggering it might have to be completely automated, in order for the deterrent to be effective. A modern twist might be to also lace the bombs with aerosols designed to exacerbate nuclear winter. A major caveat is that nuclear fallout transfer between the northern and southern hemispheres is expected to be small; unless a bomb detonates in each hemisphere, the effect of a bomb detonated in one hemisphere on the other is diminished.

== Effects of nuclear war ==
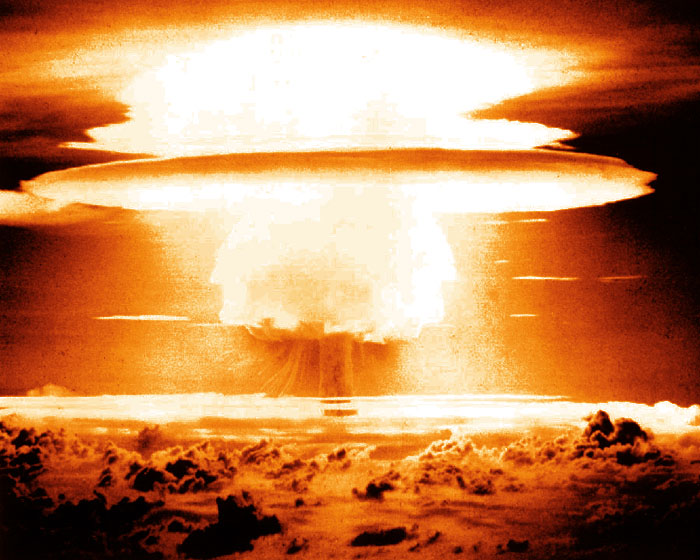
Castle Bravo nuclear test

Historically, it has been difficult to estimate the total number of deaths resulting from a global nuclear exchange because scientists are continually discovering new effects of nuclear weapons, and also revising existing models.

Early reports considered direct effects from nuclear blast and radiation and indirect effects from economic, social, and political disruption. In a 1979 report for the U.S. Senate, the Office of Technology Assessment estimated casualties under different scenarios. For a full-scale countervalue/counterforce nuclear exchange between the U.S. and the Soviet Union, they predicted U.S. deaths from 35 to 77 percent (70 million to 160 million dead at the time), and Soviet deaths from 20 to 40 percent of the population.

Although this report was made when nuclear stockpiles were at much higher levels than they are today, it also was made before the risk of nuclear winter was first theorized in the early 1980s. Additionally, it did not consider other secondary effects, such as electromagnetic pulses (EMP), and the ramifications they would have on modern technology and industry.

=== Nuclear winter ===
In the early 1980s, scientists began to consider the effects of smoke and soot arising from burning wood, plastics, and petroleum fuels in nuclear-devastated cities. It was speculated that the intense heat would carry these particulates to extremely high altitudes where they could drift for weeks and block out all but a fraction of the sun's light. A landmark 1983 study by the so-called TTAPS team (Richard P. Turco, Owen Toon, Thomas P. Ackerman, James B. Pollack and Carl Sagan) was the first to model these effects and coined the term "nuclear winter."

More recent studies make use of modern global circulation models and far greater computer power than was available for the 1980s studies. A 2007 study examined the consequences of a global nuclear war involving moderate to large portions of the current global arsenal. The study found cooling by about 12–20 °C in much of the core farming regions of the US, Canada, Europe, Russia and China and as much as 35 °C in parts of Russia for the first two summer growing seasons. The changes they found were also much longer-lasting than previously thought, because their new model better represented entry of soot aerosols in the upper stratosphere, where precipitation does not occur, and therefore clearance was on the order of 10 years. In addition, they found that global cooling caused a weakening of the global hydrological cycle, reducing global precipitation by about 45%.

The authors did not discuss the implications for agriculture in depth, but noted that a 1986 study which assumed no food production for a year projected that "most of the people on the planet would run out of food and starve to death by then" and commented that their own results show that, "This period of no food production needs to be extended by many years, making the impacts of nuclear winter even worse than previously thought."

In contrast to the above investigations of global nuclear conflicts, studies have shown that even small-scale, regional nuclear conflicts could disrupt the global climate for a decade or more. In a regional nuclear conflict scenario where two opposing nations in the subtropics would each use 50 Hiroshima-sized nuclear weapons (about 15 kilotons each) on major populated centres, the researchers estimated as much as five million tons of soot would be released, which would produce a cooling of several degrees over large areas of North America and Eurasia, including most of the grain-growing regions. The cooling would last for years, and according to the research, could be "catastrophic". Additionally, the analysis showed a 10% drop in average global precipitation, with the largest losses in the low latitudes due to failure of the monsoons.

Regional nuclear conflicts could also inflict significant damage to the ozone layer. A 2008 study found that a regional nuclear weapons exchange could create a near-global ozone hole, triggering human health problems and impacting agriculture for at least a decade. This effect on the ozone would result from heat absorption by soot in the upper stratosphere, which would modify wind currents and draw in ozone-destroying nitrogen oxides. These high temperatures and nitrogen oxides would reduce ozone to the same dangerous levels that are experienced below the ozone hole above Antarctica every spring.

=== Nuclear famine ===
It is difficult to estimate the number of casualties that would result from nuclear winter, but it is likely that the primary effect would be global famine (known as nuclear famine), wherein mass starvation occurs due to disrupted agricultural production and distribution. In 2013 and 2022 reports, the International Physicians for the Prevention of Nuclear War (IPPNW) voiced concerns that more than two billion people, about a third of the world's population, would be at risk of starvation in the event of a regional nuclear exchange between India and Pakistan, or by the use of even a small proportion of nuclear arms held by America and Russia. Several independent studies show corroborated conclusions that agricultural outputs would be significantly reduced for years by climatic changes driven by nuclear wars. Reduction of food supply would be further exacerbated by rising food prices, affecting hundreds of millions of vulnerable people, especially in the poorest nations of the world.

According to a peer-reviewed study published in the journal Nature Food in August 2022, a full-scale nuclear war between the U.S. and Russia might kill 360 million people directly and more than 5 billion people might die as a consequence from starvation due to soot created by firestorms after nuclear bombing. More than 2 billion people were projected to die as a consequence from a smaller-scale nuclear war between India and Pakistan. In the event of a nuclear war between Russia and the United States, 99% of the people in the United States, Russia, Europe, and China would die.

=== Electromagnetic pulse ===
An electromagnetic pulse (EMP) is a burst of electromagnetic radiation. Nuclear explosions create a pulse of electromagnetic radiation called a nuclear EMP or NEMP. Such EMP interference is known to be generally disruptive or damaging to electronic equipment.

By disabling electronics and their functioning, an EMP would disable hospitals, water treatment facilities, food storage facilities, and all electronic forms of communication, and thereby threaten key aspects of the modern human condition. Certain EMP attacks could lead to a large loss of power for months or years. Currently, failures of the power grid are dealt with using support from the outside. In the event of an EMP attack, such support would not exist and all damaged components, devices, and electronics would need to be completely replaced.

In 2013, the US House of Representatives considered the "Secure High-voltage Infrastructure for Electricity from Lethal Damage Act" that would provide surge protection for some 300 large transformers around the country. The problem of protecting civilian infrastructure from electromagnetic pulse has also been intensively studied throughout the European Union, and in particular by the United Kingdom. While precautions have been taken, James Woolsey and the EMP Commission suggested that an EMP is the most significant threat to the U.S.

The risk of an EMP, either through solar or atmospheric activity or enemy attack, while not dismissed, was suggested to be overblown by the news media in a commentary in Physics Today. Instead, the weapons from rogue states were still too small and uncoordinated to cause a massive EMP, underground infrastructure is sufficiently protected, and there will be enough warning time from continuous solar observatories like SOHO to protect surface transformers should a devastating solar storm be detected.

=== Nuclear fallout ===
One part of nuclear holocaust is worldwide fallout; such global fallout has happened as a result of past nuclear weapons testing, numbering in the thousands, with many being atmospheric. A fast increase of global background radiation, peaking in 1963 (the Bomb pulse) urged, among other things, states to sign bans on nuclear weapons testing. The global fallout has caused deaths, for example through increased cancer rates, of about 2.4 million people globally according to 2020 estimates, while older estimates placed them in the hundreds of thousands.

Nuclear fallout is the residual radioactive dust and ash propelled into the upper atmosphere following a nuclear explosion. Fallout is usually limited to the immediate area, and can only spread for hundreds of kilometers from the explosion site if the explosion is high enough in the atmosphere. Fallout may get entrained with the products of a pyrocumulus cloud and fall as black rain (rain darkened by soot and other particulates).

This radioactive dust, usually consisting of fission products mixed with bystanding atoms that are neutron activated by exposure, is a highly dangerous kind of radioactive contamination. The main radiation hazard from fallout is due to short-lived radionuclides external to the body. While most of the particles carried by nuclear fallout decay rapidly, some radioactive particles will have half-lives of seconds to a few months. Some radioactive isotopes, like strontium-90 and caesium-137, are very long-lived and will create radioactive hot spots for up to 5 years after the initial explosion. Fallout and black rain may contaminate waterways, agriculture, and soil. Contact with radioactive materials can lead to radiation poisoning through external exposure or accidental consumption. In acute doses over a short amount of time radiation will lead to prodromal syndrome, bone marrow death, central nervous system death and gastrointestinal death. Over longer periods of exposure to radiation, cancer becomes the main health risk. Long-term radiation exposure can also lead to in utero effects on human development and transgenerational genetic damage.

== Origins and analysis of extinction hypotheses ==
As a result of the extensive nuclear fallout of the 1954 Castle Bravo nuclear detonation, author Nevil Shute wrote the popular novel On the Beach, released in 1957. In this novel, so much fallout is generated in a nuclear war that all human life is extinguished. However, the premise that all of humanity would die following a nuclear war and only the "cockroaches would survive" is critically dealt with in the 1988 book Would the Insects Inherit the Earth and Other Subjects of Concern to Those Who Worry About Nuclear War, by nuclear weapons expert Philip J. Dolan. Based upon studies on the effects of the massive hydrogen bombs at the Bikini Atoll and Eniwetok Atoll, Dolan refutes the theory that some small plant specimens and bacteria would be the only lifeforms to survive an all-out nuclear war. All the mentioned tests witnessed full recovery of the local ecosystem.

In 1982, nuclear disarmament activist Jonathan Schell published The Fate of the Earth, which is regarded by many to be the first carefully argued presentation that concluded that extinction is a significant possibility from nuclear war. However, Brian Martin calls the conclusions "quite dubious". The impetus for Schell's work, according to physicist Brian Martin, was:

The implicit premise [...] that if people are not taking action on the issue, they must not perceive it as threatening enough. Perhaps if the thought of 500 million people dying in a nuclear war is not enough to stimulate action, then the thought of extinction will. Indeed, Schell explicitly advocates use of the fear of extinction as the basis for inspiring the "complete rearrangement of world politics" (p. 221)

The belief in "overkill" is also commonly encountered, with an example being the following statement made by nuclear disarmament activist Philip Noel-Baker in 1971: "Both the US and the Soviet Union now possess nuclear stockpiles large enough to exterminate mankind three or four – some say ten – times over". Brian Martin suggested that the origin of this belief was from "crude linear extrapolations" of the bombing of Hiroshima. He said that if the bomb dropped on Hiroshima had been 1,000 times as powerful, it could not have killed 1,000 times as many people. Similarly, it is common to see stated that the combined explosive energy released in the entirety of World War II was about 3 megatons, while a nuclear war with warhead stockpiles at Cold War highs would release 6000 WWII's of explosive energy. An estimate for the necessary amount of fallout to begin to have the potential of causing human extinction is regarded by physicist and disarmament activist Joseph Rotblat to be 10 to 100 times the megatonnage in nuclear arsenals as they stood in 1976; however, with the world megatonnage decreasing since the Cold War ended this possibility remains hypothetical.

The massive use and deployment of nuclear weapons are commonly theorized to yield enough global destructive potential to render large parts of the Earth uninhabitable.

According to the 1980 United Nations report General and Complete Disarmament: Comprehensive Study on Nuclear Weapons: Report of the Secretary-General, it was estimated that there were a total of about 40,000 nuclear warheads in existence at that time, with a potential combined explosive yield of approximately 13,000 megatons.

By comparison – in the timeline of volcanism on Earth – the 1815 eruption of Mount Tambora exploded with a force of roughly 30,000 megatons, and ejected 160 km^{3} (38 cu mi) of mostly rock and tephra, which included 120 million tonnes of sulfur dioxide as an upper estimate, turning 1816 into the "year without a summer" due to the levels of global dimming sulfate aerosols and ash expelled. The larger Mount Toba eruption, which occurred approximately 74,000 years ago, produced an estimated 2,800 km^{3} (670 cu mi) of tephra and 6,000 million tonnes (6,600 million short tons) of sulfur dioxide, with a possible explosion force of 20,000,000 megatons (Mt) of TNT, forming Lake Toba and reducing the human population to mere tens of thousands. The Chicxulub impact, connected with the extinction of the dinosaurs, corresponds to at least 70,000,000 Mt of energy, which is roughly 7000 times the combined maximum arsenal of the US and Soviet Union.

Comparisons with supervolcanos are more misleading than helpful due to the different aerosols released, the likely air burst fuzing height of nuclear weapons and the globally scattered location of these potential nuclear detonations all being in contrast to the singular and subterranean nature of a supervolcanic eruption. Moreover, assuming the entire world stockpile of weapons were grouped together, it would be difficult due to the nuclear fratricide effect to ensure the individual weapons would detonate all at once. Nonetheless, many people believe that a full-scale nuclear war would result, through the nuclear winter effect, in the extinction of the human species, though not all analysts agree on the assumptions put into these nuclear winter models.

== See also ==
- Second Cold War – Term referring to heightened tensions in the 21st century
- Environmental impact of war – Environmental problems caused by warfare
- Global catastrophic risk – Hypothetical global-scale disaster risk
- Human extinction – End of the human species
- List of nuclear holocaust fiction
- Nuclear anxiety – Fear of nuclear war
- Nuclear terrorism – Terrorism involving nuclear material or weapons
- Silurian hypothesis – Thought experiment to assess ability to detect evidence of a prior advanced civilization
- World War III – Hypothetical future global conflict
