= De-alerting =

Method to delay nuclear weapon launch time

De-alerting introduces some reversible physical change(s) to nuclear weapons or weapon systems in order to lengthen the time required to use nuclear weapons in combat. Because thousands of strategic nuclear warheads mounted on ballistic missiles remain on high-alert, launch-ready status, capable of being launched in only a few minutes, de-alerting has been proposed as a means to reduce likelihood that these forces will be used deliberately or accidentally.

De-alerting can be used to rapidly implement existing nuclear arms control agreements ahead of schedule. Arms control agreements create a timetable to introduce irreversible changes to weapon systems (designed to reduce or eliminate the total numbers of these systems), but these changes generally occur incrementally over the course of a number of years. De-alerting can quickly implement the entire range of negotiated reductions in a reversible fashion (which over time are then made irreversible), thereby bringing the benefits of the negotiated reductions into being much more rapidly.

It has been proposed that de-alerted nuclear weapon systems be classified into at least two categories or stages. Stage I de-alerted weapons would require 24 hours to bring the weapon system back to high-alert status, and would preclude Launch-on-Warning capability and policy, thereby making impossible an accidental nuclear war caused by a false warning generated by early warning systems.

== Examples of de-alerting ==
1. Placing large, visible barriers on top of missile silo lids would be difficult to rapidly remove and could be easily monitored by on-site observers or national technical means (satellites).
2. Removing or altering firing switches of missiles to prevent rapid launch.
3. Removing batteries, gyroscopes, or guidance mechanisms from rockets or re-entry vehicles.
4. Removing warheads from missiles and storing them in a separate, monitored location. Technical means could be engineered to provide frequent checks that nuclear missiles posed no immediate threat.

== Limitations ==
De-alerting may require negotiations and verification procedures in order to accomplish symmetrical force reductions on both sides. However, de-alerting can occur rapidly if sufficient political will exists, e.g., in 1991, the Bush and Gorbachev Presidential Nuclear Initiatives resulted in the de-alerting of US and Soviet strategic bombers and the storage of their nuclear weapons, as well as the early retirement of 503 ICBMs, including 134 with multiple warheads scheduled for elimination under START I. The process eventually led to a reduction of 17,000 deployed tactical nuclear weapons, the deepest reductions in nuclear arsenals to date.

== See also ==
- Prompt launch
