= Nuclear warfare =

Military conflict that deploys nuclear weaponry

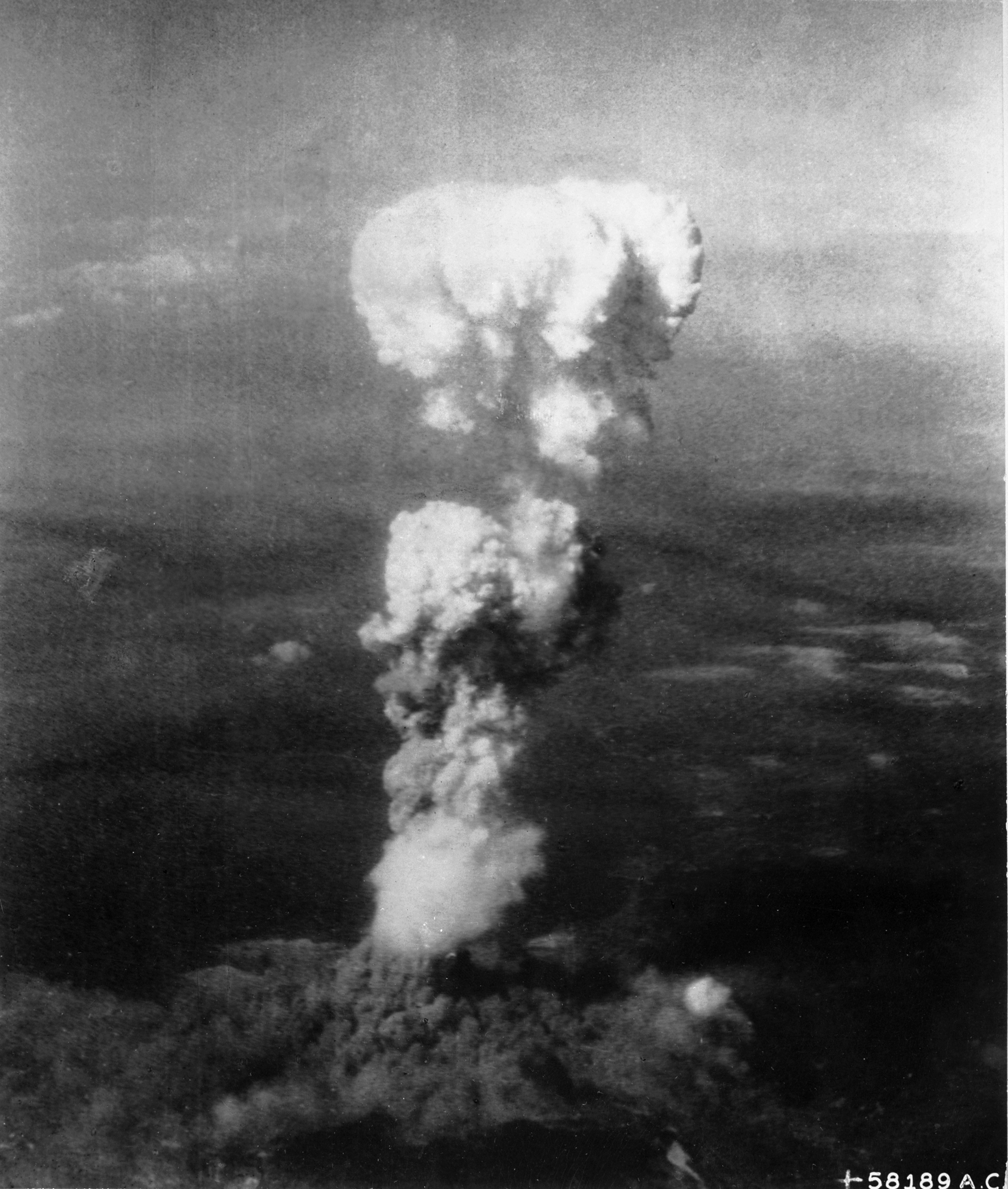
The mushroom cloud over Hiroshima following the detonation of the Little Boy nuclear bomb on 6 August 1945. The atomic bombings of Hiroshima and Nagasaki remain the first and only wartime uses of nuclear weapons in history.

Nuclear warfare, also known as atomic warfare, is a military conflict or prepared political strategy that deploys nuclear weaponry. Nuclear weapons are weapons of mass destruction; in contrast to conventional warfare, nuclear warfare can produce significantly more destruction in a much shorter time and can have a long-lasting radiological result. A large nuclear exchange would kill hundreds of millions of people. It would have long-term effects, from the fallout released, and could also lead to secondary effects, such as nuclear winter, nuclear famine, and societal collapse. A global nuclear war with current national stockpiles may lead to various devastating scenarios, including human extinction.

As of 2026, the first and only use of nuclear weapons in armed conflict was the United States atomic bombings of Hiroshima and Nagasaki, on August 6 and 9, 1945, in the final days of World War II. The two bombings resulted in the deaths of between 150,000 and 246,000 people. A debate continues over ethical, legal, and military aspects of the bombings, including their role in the surrender of Japan.

The Cold War prompted the nuclear arms race. Nuclear weapons were later developed by the Soviet Union (1949), the United Kingdom (1952), France (1960), and China (1964). In 1974, India, and in 1998, Pakistan, with a history of conflict, developed nuclear weapons. Israel (1960s) and North Korea (2006) also developed nuclear weapons. South Africa manufactured several complete nuclear weapons in the 1980s, but during the 1990s, it became the only country to eliminate its domestically produced nuclear arsenal, and abandon further nuclear weapon production. Nuclear weapons have been detonated on over 2,000 occasions for various testing purposes.

Countries have increased their readiness to carry out strategic and tactical nuclear attacks in response to intensifying conflicts, including the Korean War, First and Second Taiwan Strait Crises, Cuban Missile Crisis, Vietnam War, Sino-Soviet border conflict, Yom Kippur War, Gulf War, and Russo-Ukrainian war. The 1962 Cuban Missile Crisis, between the nuclear superpowers of the U.S. and Soviet Union, is often considered the closest call with a nuclear exchange and possible World War III. Additionally, nuclear attack early warning systems have sometimes produced false alarms, increasing the risk of nuclear war, such as Soviet satellites in 1983 and Russian radar in 1995.

After the dissolution of the Soviet Union in 1991 and the resultant end of the Cold War, the threat of a major nuclear war between the U.S. and Soviet Union has declined. Concern shifted to the prevention of localized nuclear conflicts resulting from nuclear proliferation, and the threat of nuclear terrorism. However, the threat of nuclear war is considered to have resurged since the start of the current phase of the Russo-Ukrainian war in 2022, particularly with regard to Russian threats to use nuclear weapons during the war.

Since 1947, the Doomsday Clock of the Bulletin of the Atomic Scientists has visualized how close the world is to a nuclear war. The Doomsday Clock reached a high point in 1953, when the Clock was set to two minutes until midnight after the U.S. and the Soviet Union began testing hydrogen bombs, and in 2018, following the failure of world leaders to address tensions relating to nuclear weapons and climate change issues. Since 2026, the Clock has been set at 85 seconds to midnight, the closest it has ever been.

== Types of nuclear warfare ==
Nuclear warfare scenarios are usually divided into two groups, each with different effects and potentially fought with different types of nuclear armaments.

The first, a limited nuclear war (sometimes attack or exchange), refers to the controlled use of nuclear weapons, whereby the implicit threat exists that a nation can still escalate their use of nuclear weapons. For example, using a small number of nuclear weapons against strictly military targets could be escalated through increasing the number of weapons used, or escalated through the selection of different targets. Limited attacks are thought to be a more credible response against attacks that do not justify all-out retaliation, such as an enemy's limited use of nuclear weapons.

The second, a full-scale nuclear war, could consist of large numbers of nuclear weapons used in an attack aimed at an entire country, including military, economic, and civilian targets. Such an attack would almost certainly destroy the entire economic, social, and military infrastructure of the target nation, and would likely have a devastating effect on Earth's biosphere.

Some Cold War strategists such as Henry Kissinger argued that a limited nuclear war could be possible between two heavily armed superpowers (such as the United States and the Soviet Union). Some predict, however, that a limited war could potentially "escalate" into a full-scale nuclear war. Others have called limited nuclear war "global nuclear holocaust in slow motion", arguing that—once such a war took place—others would be sure to follow over a period of decades, effectively rendering the planet uninhabitable in the same way that a "full-scale nuclear war" between superpowers would, only taking a much longer (and arguably more agonizing) path to the same result.

Even the most optimistic predictions of the effects of a major nuclear exchange foresee the death of many millions of victims within a very short period of time. Such predictions usually include the breakdown of government, professional, and commercial institutions, vital to the continuation of civilization. The resulting loss of vital affordances (food, water and electricity production and distribution, medical and information services, etc.) would account for millions more deaths. More pessimistic predictions argue that a full-scale nuclear war could potentially bring about the human extinction, or at least its near extinction, with only a relatively small number of survivors (mainly in remote areas) and a reduced quality of life and life expectancy for centuries afterward. However, such predictions, assuming total war with nuclear arsenals at Cold War highs, have not been without criticism. Such a horrific catastrophe as global nuclear warfare would almost certainly cause permanent damage to most complex life on the planet, its ecosystems, and the global climate.

A study presented at the annual meeting of the American Geophysical Union in December 2006 asserted that a small-scale regional nuclear war could produce as many direct fatalities as all of World War II and disrupt the global climate for a decade or more. In a regional nuclear conflict scenario in which two opposing nations in the subtropics each used 50 Hiroshima-sized nuclear weapons (c. 15 kiloton each) on major population centers, the researchers predicted fatalities ranging from 2.6 million to 16.7 million per country. The authors of the study estimated that as much as five million tons of soot could be released, producing a cooling of several degrees over large areas of North America and Eurasia (including most of the grain-growing regions). The cooling would last for years and could be "catastrophic", according to the researchers.

Either a limited or full-scale nuclear exchange could occur during an accidental nuclear war, in which the use of nuclear weapons is triggered unintentionally. Postulated triggers for this scenario have included malfunctioning early warning devices and/or targeting computers, deliberate malfeasance by rogue military commanders, consequences of an accidental straying of warplanes into enemy airspace, reactions to unannounced missile tests during tense diplomatic periods, reactions to military exercises, mistranslated or miscommunicated messages, and others.

A number of these scenarios actually occurred during the Cold War, though none resulted in the use of nuclear weapons. Many such scenarios have been depicted in popular culture, such as in the 1959 film On the Beach, the 1962 novel Fail-Safe, the 1964 film Dr. Strangelove or: How I Learned to Stop Worrying and Love the Bomb, the 1983 film WarGames, and the 1984 film Threads.

=== Sub-strategic use ===
The above examples envisage nuclear warfare at a strategic level, i.e., total war. However, nuclear powers have the ability to undertake more limited engagements.

"Sub-strategic use" includes the use of either "low-yield" tactical nuclear weapons, or of variable yield strategic nuclear weapons in a very limited role, as compared to exchanges of larger-yield strategic nuclear weapons over major population centers. This was described by the UK Parliamentary Defence Select Committee as "the launch of one or a limited number of missiles against an adversary as a means of conveying a political message, warning or demonstration of resolve". It is believed that all current nuclear weapons states possess tactical nuclear weapons, with the exception of the United Kingdom, which decommissioned its tactical warheads in 1998. However, the UK does possess scalable-yield strategic warheads, and this technology tends to blur the difference between "strategic", "sub-strategic", and "tactical" use or weapons. American, French and British nuclear submarines are believed to carry at least some missiles with dial-a-yield warheads for this purpose, potentially allowing a strike as low as one kiloton (or less) against a single target. Only the People's Republic of China and the Republic of India have declarative, unqualified, unconditional "no first use" nuclear weapons policies. India and Pakistan maintain only a credible minimum deterrence.

Commodore Tim Hare, former Director of Nuclear Policy at the British Ministry of Defence, has described "sub-strategic use" as offering the Government "an extra option in the escalatory process before it goes for an all-out strategic strike which would deliver unacceptable damage". However, this sub-strategic capacity has been criticized as potentially increasing the "acceptability" of using nuclear weapons. Combined with the trend in the reduction in the worldwide nuclear arsenal as of 2007 is the warhead miniaturization and modernization of the remaining strategic weapons that is presently occurring in all the declared nuclear weapon states, into more "usable" configurations. The Stockholm International Peace Research Institute suggests that this is creating a culture where use of these weapons is more acceptable and therefore is increasing the risk of war, as these modern weapons do not possess the same psychological deterrent value as the large Cold-War era, multi-megaton warheads.

In many ways, this present change in the balance of terror can be seen as the complete embracement of the switch from the 1950s Eisenhower doctrine of "massive retaliation" to one of "flexible response", which has been growing in importance in the US nuclear war fighting plan/SIOP every decade since.

For example, the United States adopted a policy in 1996 of allowing the targeting of its nuclear weapons at non-state actors ("terrorists") armed with weapons of mass destruction.

Another dimension to the tactical use of nuclear weapons is that of such weapons deployed at sea for use against surface and submarine vessels. Until 1992, vessels of the United States Navy (and their aircraft) deployed various such weapons as bombs, rockets (guided and unguided), torpedoes, and depth charges. Such tactical naval nuclear weapons were considered more acceptable to use early in a conflict because there would be few civilian casualties. It was feared by many planners that such use would probably quickly have escalated into a large-scale nuclear war. This situation was particularly exacerbated by the fact that such weapons at sea were not constrained by the safeguards provided by the Permissive Action Link attached to U.S. Air Force and Army nuclear weapons. It is unknown if the navies of the other nuclear powers yet today deploy tactical nuclear weapons at sea.

The 2018 US Nuclear Posture Review emphasised the need for the US to have sub-strategic nuclear weapons as additional layers for its nuclear deterrence.

=== Nuclear terrorism ===
Nuclear terrorism by non-state organizations or actors (even individuals) is a largely unknown and understudied factor in nuclear deterrence thinking, as states possessing nuclear weapons are susceptible to retaliation in kind, while sub- or trans-state actors may be less so. The collapse of the Soviet Union has given rise to the possibility that former Soviet nuclear weapons might become available on the black market (so-called 'loose nukes').

A number of other concerns have been expressed about the security of nuclear weapons in newer nuclear powers with relatively less stable governments, such as Pakistan, but in each case, the fears have been addressed to some extent by statements and evidence provided by those nations, as well as cooperative programs between nations. Worry remains, however, in many circles that a relative decrease in the security of nuclear weapons has emerged in recent years, and that terrorists or others may attempt to exert control over (or use) nuclear weapons, militarily applicable technology, or nuclear materials and fuel.

Another possible nuclear terrorism threat are devices designed to disperse radioactive materials over a large area using conventional explosives, called dirty bombs. The detonation of a "dirty bomb" would not cause a nuclear explosion, nor would it release enough radiation to kill or injure a large number of people. However, it could cause severe disruption and require potentially very costly decontamination procedures and increased spending on security measures.

Radioactive materials can also be used for targeted assassinations. For example, the poisoning of Alexander Litvinenko was described by medical professionals, as "an ominous landmark: the beginning of an era of nuclear terrorism."

=== Alternative conflict resolution ===
Alternatives to nuclear warfare include nuclear deterrence, nuclear disarmament and Treaty on the Non-Proliferation of Nuclear Weapons.

== History ==
=== 1940s ===
==== Atomic bombings of Hiroshima and Nagasaki ====
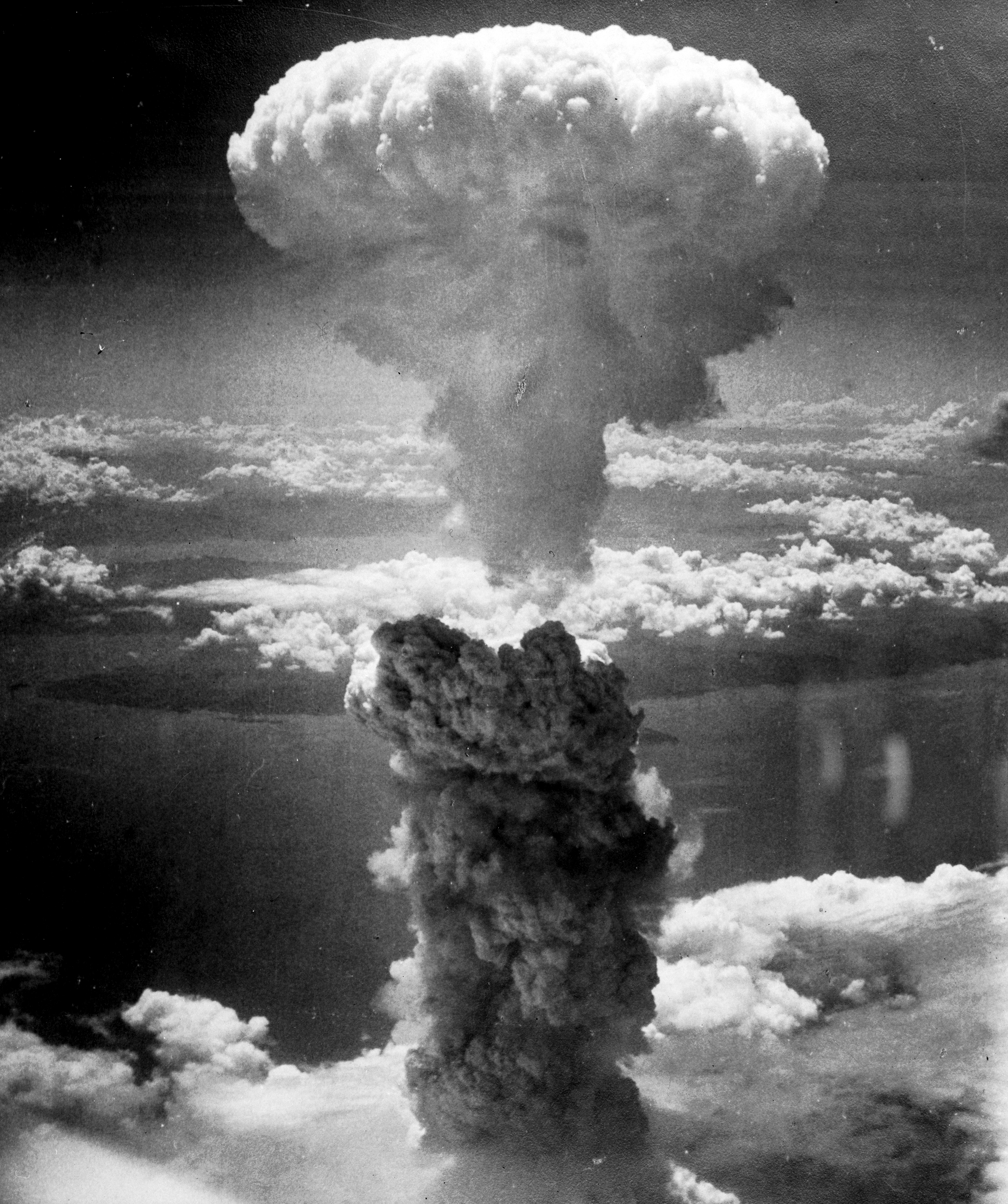
Mushroom cloud from the atomic explosion over Nagasaki rising 18,000 m (59,000 ft) into the air on the morning of August 9, 1945

During the final stages of World War II in 1945, the United States conducted atomic raids on the Japanese cities of Hiroshima and Nagasaki, the first on August 6, 1945, and the second on August 9, 1945. These two events were the first and only times nuclear weapons have been used in combat.

For six months before the atomic bombings, the U.S. 20th Air Force under General Curtis LeMay executed low-level incendiary raids against Japanese cities. The most destructive air raid to occur during the process was not the nuclear attacks, but the Operation Meetinghouse raid on Tokyo. On the night of March 9–10, 1945, Operation Meetinghouse commenced and 334 Boeing B-29 Superfortress bombers took off to raid, with 279 of them dropping 1,665 tons of incendiaries and explosives on Tokyo. The bombing was meant to burn wooden buildings and indeed the bombing caused fire that created a 50 m/s wind, which is comparable to tornadoes. Each bomber carried 6 tons of bombs. A total of 381,300 bombs, which amount to 1,783 tons of bombs, were used in the bombing. Within a few hours of the raid, it had killed an estimated 100,000 people and destroyed 41 km^{2} (16 sq mi) of the city and 267,000 buildings in a single night — the deadliest bombing raid in military aviation history other than the atomic raids on Hiroshima and Nagasaki. By early August 1945, an estimated 450,000 people had died as the U.S. had intensely firebombed a total of 67 Japanese cities.

In late June 1945, as the U.S. wrapped up the two-and-a-half-month Battle of Okinawa (which cost the lives of 260,000 people, including 150,000 civilians), it was faced with the prospect of invading the Japanese home islands in an operation codenamed Operation Downfall. Based on the U.S. casualties from the preceding island-hopping campaigns, American commanders estimated that between 50,000 and 500,000 U.S. troops would die and at least 600,000–1,000,000 others would be injured while invading the Japanese home islands. The U.S. manufacture of 500,000 Purple Hearts from the anticipated high level of casualties during the U.S. invasion of Japan gave a demonstration of how deadly and costly it would be. President Harry S. Truman realized he could not afford such a high casualty rate, especially since over 400,000 American combatants had already died fighting in both the European and the Pacific theaters of the war.

On July 26, 1945, the United States, the United Kingdom, and the Republic of China issued a Potsdam Declaration that called for the unconditional surrender of Japan. It stated that if Japan did not surrender, it would face "prompt and utter destruction". The Japanese government ignored this ultimatum, sending a message that they were not going to surrender. In response to the rejection, President Truman authorized the dropping of the atomic bombs. At the time of its use, there were only two atomic bombs available, and despite the fact that more were in production back in mainland U.S., the third bomb wouldn't be available for combat until September.

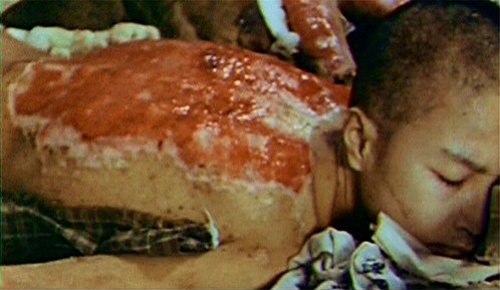
A photograph of Sumiteru Taniguchi's back injuries taken in January 1946 by a U.S. Marine photographer

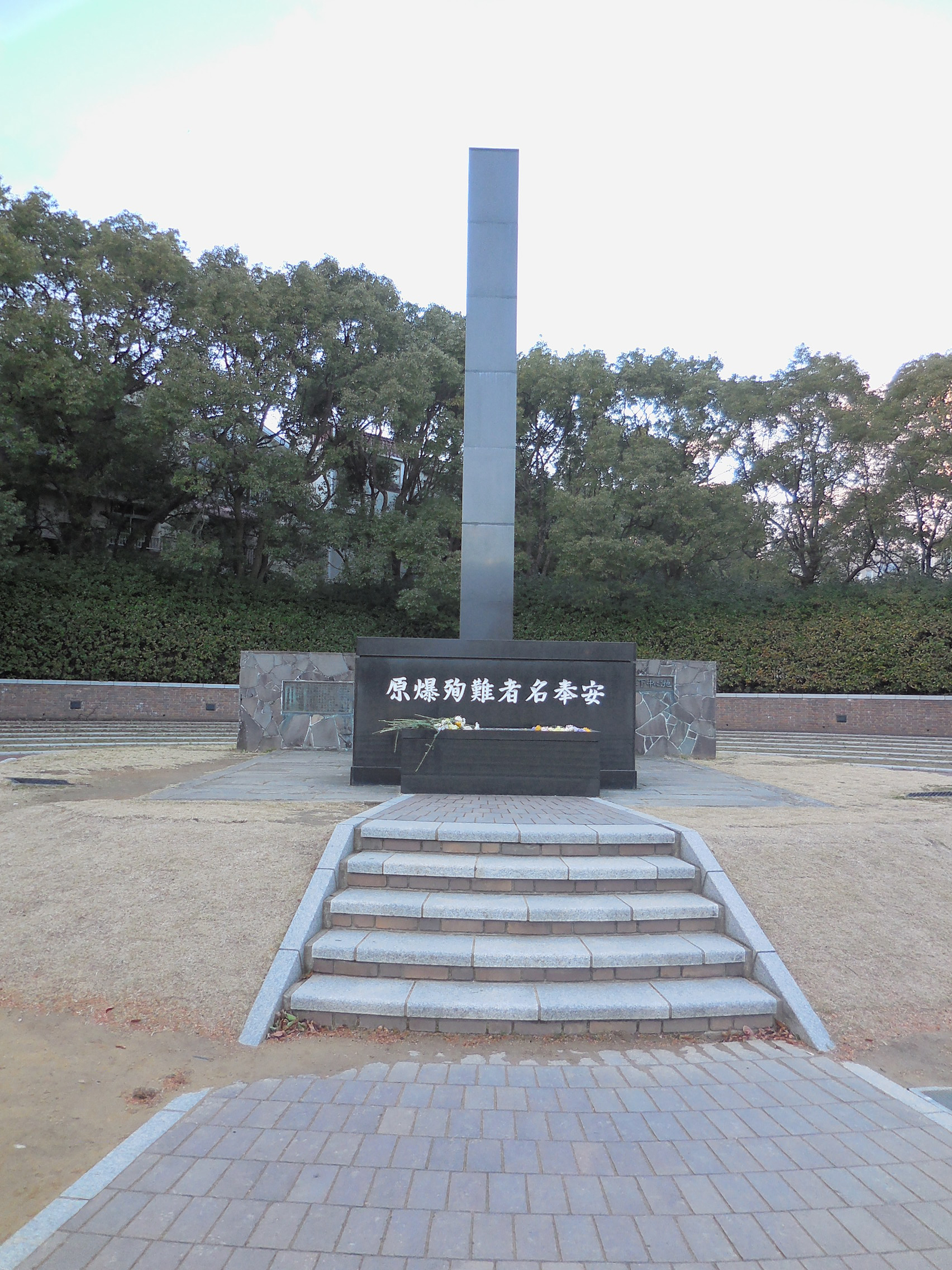
Hypocenter of Atomic bomb in Nagasaki

On August 6, 1945, the uranium-type nuclear weapon codenamed "Little Boy" was detonated over the Japanese city of Hiroshima with an energy of about 15 kilotons of TNT (63,000 gigajoules), destroying nearly 50,000 buildings (including the headquarters of the 2nd General Army and Fifth Division) and killing approximately 70,000 people, including 20,000 Japanese combatants and 20,000 Korean slave laborers. Three days later, on August 9, a plutonium-type nuclear weapon codenamed "Fat Man" was used against the Japanese city of Nagasaki, with the explosion equivalent to about 20 kilotons of TNT (84,000 gigajoules), destroying 60% of the city and killing approximately 35,000 people, including 23,200–28,200 Japanese munitions workers, 2,000 Korean slave laborers, and 150 Japanese combatants. The industrial damage in Nagasaki was high, partly owing to the inadvertent targeting of the industrial zone, leaving 68–80 percent of the non-dock industrial production destroyed. The U.S., despite not having a third device ready to be dropped, gave Japan one last warning that there would be another bombing if they did not surrender, and the target would be Tokyo.

Six days after the detonation over Nagasaki, Japan announced its surrender to the Allied Powers on August 15, 1945, signing the Instrument of Surrender on September 2, 1945, officially ending the Pacific War and, therefore, World War II, as Germany had already signed its Instrument of Surrender on May 8, 1945, ending the war in Europe. The two atomic bombings led, in part, to post-war Japan's adopting of the Three Non-Nuclear Principles, which forbade the nation from developing nuclear armaments.

==== Immediately after the Japan bombings ====
After the successful Trinity nuclear test July 16, 1945, which was the very first nuclear detonation, the Manhattan Project lead manager J. Robert Oppenheimer recalled:

We knew the world would not be the same. A few people laughed, a few people cried, and most people were silent. I remembered the line from the Hindu scripture the Bhagavad Gita. Vishnu is trying to persuade the prince that he should do his duty and to impress him takes on his multiarmed form and says, "Now, I am become Death, the destroyer of worlds." I suppose we all thought that one way or another.

— J. Robert Oppenheimer, The Decision To Drop The Bomb

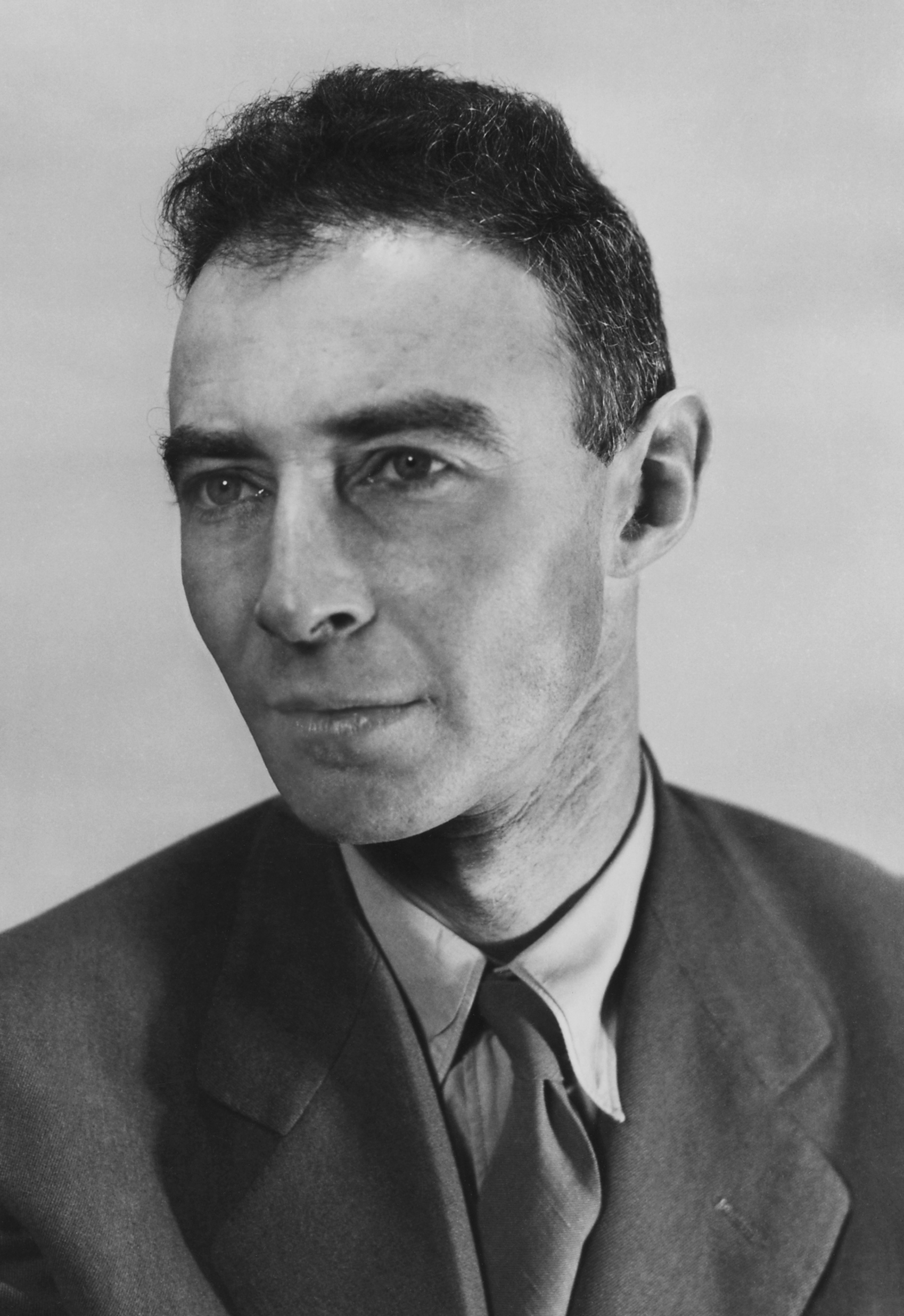
J. Robert Oppenheimer

Immediately after the atomic bombings of Japan, the status of atomic weapons in international and military relations was unclear. Presumably, the United States hoped atomic weapons could offset the Soviet Union's larger conventional ground forces in Eastern Europe, and possibly be used to pressure Soviet leader Joseph Stalin into making concessions. Under Stalin, the Soviet Union pursued its own atomic capabilities through a combination of scientific research and espionage directed against the American program. The Soviets believed that the Americans, with their limited nuclear arsenal, were unlikely to engage in any new world wars, while the Americans were not confident they could prevent a Soviet takeover of Europe, despite their atomic advantage.

Within the United States, the authority to produce and develop nuclear weapons was removed from military control and put instead under the civilian control of the United States Atomic Energy Commission. This decision reflected an understanding that nuclear weapons had unique risks and benefits that were separate from other military technology known at the time.

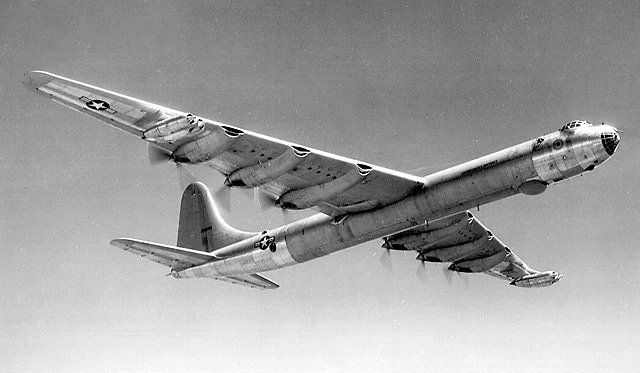
Convair B-36 bomber

For several years after World War II, the United States developed and maintained a strategic force based on the Convair B-36 bomber that would be able to attack any potential enemy from bomber bases in the United States. It deployed atomic bombs around the world for potential use in conflicts. Over a period of a few years, many in the American defense community became increasingly convinced of the invincibility of the United States to a nuclear attack. Indeed, it became generally believed that the threat of nuclear war would deter any strike against the United States.

Many proposals were suggested to put all American nuclear weapons under international control (by the newly formed United Nations, for example) as an effort to deter both their usage and a nuclear arms race. However, no terms could be arrived at that would be agreed upon by both the United States and the Soviet Union.

American and Soviet/Russian nuclear stockpiles

On August 29, 1949, the Soviet Union tested its first nuclear weapon at Semipalatinsk in Kazakhstan (see also Soviet atomic bomb project). Scientists in the United States from the Manhattan Project had warned that, in time, the Soviet Union would certainly develop nuclear capabilities of its own. Nevertheless, the effect upon military thinking and planning in the United States was dramatic, primarily because American military strategists had not anticipated the Soviets would "catch up" so soon. However, at this time, they had not discovered that the Soviets had conducted significant nuclear espionage of the project from spies at Los Alamos National Laboratory, the most significant of which was done by the theoretical physicist Klaus Fuchs. The first Soviet bomb was more or less a deliberate copy of the Fat Man plutonium device. In the same year the first US-Soviet nuclear war plan was penned in the US with Operation Dropshot.

With the monopoly over nuclear technology broken, worldwide nuclear proliferation accelerated. The United Kingdom tested its first independent atomic bomb in 1952, followed by France developing its first atomic bomb in 1960 and then China developing its first atomic bomb in 1964. While much smaller than the arsenals of the United States and the Soviet Union, Western Europe's nuclear reserves were nevertheless a significant factor in strategic planning during the Cold War. A top-secret White paper, compiled by the Royal Air Force and produced for the British Government in 1959, estimated that British V bombers carrying nuclear weapons were capable of destroying key cities and military targets in the Soviet Union, with an estimated 16 million deaths in the Soviet Union (half of whom were estimated to be killed on impact and the rest fatally injured) before bomber aircraft from the U.S. Strategic Air Command reached their targets.

=== 1950s ===
"USAF Atomic Bomb Delivery Aircraft" (1952).

Although the Soviet Union had nuclear weapon capabilities at the beginning of the Cold War, the United States still had an advantage in terms of bombers and weapons. In any exchange of hostilities, the United States would have been capable of bombing the Soviet Union, whereas the Soviet Union would have more difficulty carrying out the reverse mission.

The widespread introduction of jet-powered interceptor aircraft upset this imbalance somewhat by reducing the effectiveness of the American bomber fleet. In 1949 Curtis LeMay was placed in command of the Strategic Air Command and instituted a program to update the bomber fleet to one that was all-jet. During the early 1950s the B-47 Stratojet and B-52 Stratofortress were introduced, providing the ability to bomb the Soviet Union more easily. Before the development of a capable strategic missile force in the Soviet Union, much of the war-fighting doctrine held by western nations revolved around using a large number of smaller nuclear weapons in a tactical role. It is debatable whether such use could be considered "limited" however because it was believed that the United States would use its own strategic weapons (mainly bombers at the time) should the Soviet Union deploy any kind of nuclear weapon against civilian targets. Douglas MacArthur, an American general, was fired by President Harry Truman, partially because he persistently requested permission to use his own discretion in deciding whether to utilize atomic weapons on the People's Republic of China in 1951 during the Korean War. Mao Zedong, China's communist leader, gave the impression that he would welcome a nuclear war with the capitalists because it would annihilate what he viewed as their imperialist system.

Let us imagine how many people would die if war breaks out. There are 2.7 billion people in the world, and a third could be lost. If it is a little higher it could be half ... I say that if the worst came to the worst and one-half dies, there will still be one-half left, but imperialism would be razed to the ground and the whole world would become socialist. After a few years there would be 2.7 billion people again.

— Mao Zedong, 1957

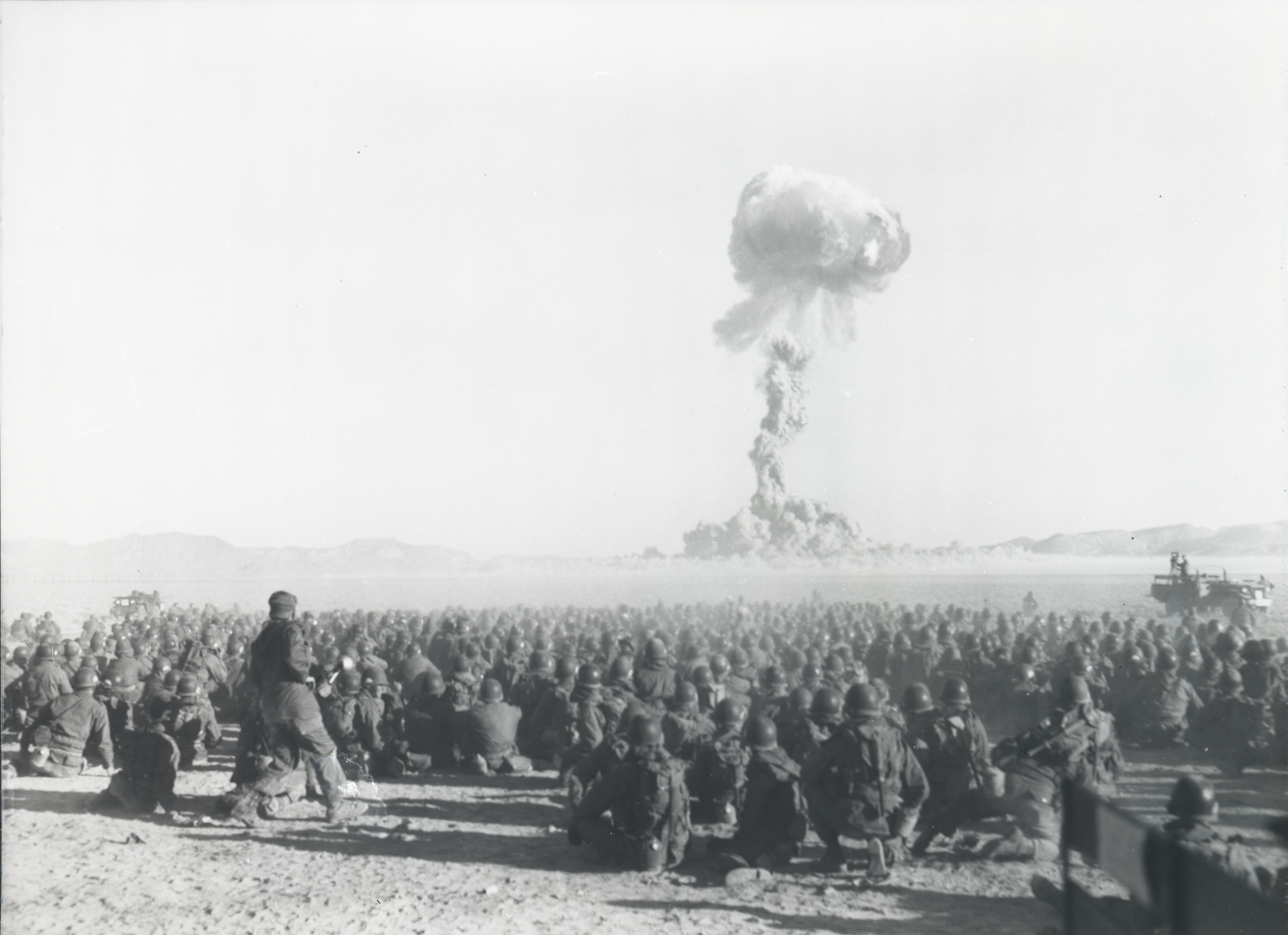
The U.S. and USSR conducted hundreds of nuclear tests, including the Desert Rock exercises at the Nevada Test Site, USA, pictured above during the Korean War to familiarize their soldiers with conducting operations and counter-measures around nuclear detonations, as the Korean War threatened to expand.

The concept of a "Fortress North America" emerged during the Second World War and persisted into the Cold War to refer to the option of defending Canada and the United States against their enemies if the rest of the world were lost to them. This option was rejected with the formation of NATO and the decision to permanently station troops in Europe.

In the summer of 1951, Project Vista started, in which project analysts such as Robert F. Christy looked at how to defend Western Europe from a Soviet invasion. The emerging development of tactical nuclear weapons was looked upon as a means to give Western forces a qualitative advantage over the Soviet numerical supremacy in conventional weapons.

Several scares about the increasing ability of the Soviet Union's strategic bomber forces surfaced during the 1950s. The defensive response by the United States was to deploy a fairly strong "layered defense" consisting of interceptor aircraft and anti-aircraft missiles, like the Nike, and guns, like the M51 Skysweeper, near larger cities. However, this was a small response compared to the construction of a huge fleet of nuclear bombers. The principal nuclear strategy was to massively penetrate the Soviet Union. Because such a large area could not be defended against this overwhelming attack in any credible way, the Soviet Union would lose any exchange.

This logic became ingrained in American nuclear doctrine and persisted for much of the duration of the Cold War. As long as the strategic American nuclear forces could overwhelm their Soviet counterparts, a Soviet pre-emptive strike could be averted. Moreover, the Soviet Union could not afford to build any reasonable counterforce, as the economic output of the United States was far larger than that of the Soviets, and they would be unable to achieve "nuclear parity".

Soviet nuclear doctrine, however, did not match American nuclear doctrine. Soviet military planners assumed they could win a nuclear war. Therefore, they expected a large-scale nuclear exchange, followed by a "conventional war" which itself would involve heavy use of tactical nuclear weapons. American doctrine rather assumed that Soviet doctrine was similar, with the mutual in mutually assured destruction necessarily requiring that the other side see things in much the same way, rather than believing—as the Soviets did—that they could fight a large-scale, "combined nuclear and conventional" war.

In accordance with their doctrine, the Soviet Union conducted large-scale military exercises to explore the possibility of defensive and offensive warfare during a nuclear war. The exercise, under the code name of "Snowball", involved the detonation of a nuclear bomb about twice as powerful as that which fell on Nagasaki and an army of approximately 45,000 soldiers on maneuvers through the hypocenter immediately after the blast. The exercise was conducted on September 14, 1954, under command of Marshal Georgy Zhukov to the north of Totskoye village in Orenburg Oblast, Russia.

"The Atom Soldier - The Big Picture" Camp Desert Rock military exercise information film reel.

A revolution in nuclear strategic thought occurred with the introduction of the intercontinental ballistic missile (ICBM), which the Soviet Union first successfully tested in August 1957. In order to deliver a warhead to a target, a missile was much faster and more cost-effective than a bomber, and enjoyed a higher survivability due to the enormous difficulty of interception of the ICBMs (due to their high altitude and extreme speed). The Soviet Union could now afford to achieve nuclear parity with the United States in raw numbers, although for a time, they appeared to have chosen not to.

Photos of Soviet missile sites set off a wave of panic in the U.S. military, something the launch of Sputnik would do for the American public a few months later. Politicians, notably then-U.S. Senator John F. Kennedy suggested that a "missile gap" existed between the Soviet Union and the United States. The US military gave missile development programs the highest national priority, and several spy aircraft and reconnaissance satellites were designed and deployed to observe Soviet progress.

Early ICBMs and bombers were relatively inaccurate, which led to the concept of countervalue strikes — attacks directly on the enemy population, which would theoretically lead to a collapse of the enemy's will to fight. During the Cold War, the Soviet Union invested in extensive protected civilian infrastructure, such as large "nuclear-proof" bunkers and non-perishable food stores. By comparison, smaller scale civil defense programs were instituted in the United States starting in the 1950s, where schools and other public buildings had basements stocked with non-perishable food supplies, canned water, first aid, and dosimeter and Geiger counter radiation-measuring devices. Many of the locations were given "fallout shelter" designation signs. CONELRAD radio information systems were adopted, whereby the commercial radio sector (later supplemented by the National Emergency Alarm Repeaters) would broadcast on two AM radio frequencies in the event of a Civil Defense (CD) emergency. These two frequencies, 640 and 1240 kHz, were marked with small CD triangles on the tuning dial of radios of the period, as can still be seen on 1950s-vintage radios on online auction sites and museums. A few backyard fallout shelters were built by private individuals.

Henry Kissinger's view on tactical nuclear war in his controversial 1957 book Nuclear Weapons and Foreign Policy was that any nuclear weapon exploded in air burst mode that was below 500 kilotons in yield and thus averting serious fallout, may be more decisive and less costly in human lives than a protracted conventional war.

A list of targets made by the United States was released sometime during December 2015 by the U.S. National Archives and Records Administration. The language used to describe targets is "designated ground zeros". The list was released after a request was made during 2006 by William Burr who belongs to a research group at George Washington University, and belongs to a previously top-secret 800-page document. The list is entitled "Atomic Weapons Requirements Study for 1959" and was produced by U.S. Strategic Air Command during the year 1956.

=== 1960s ===
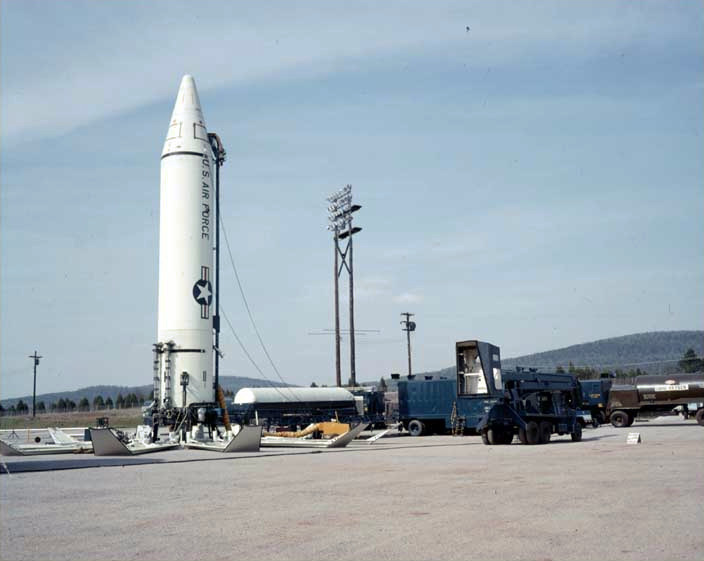
More than 100 US-built missiles having the capability to strike Moscow with nuclear warheads were deployed in Italy and Turkey in 1961

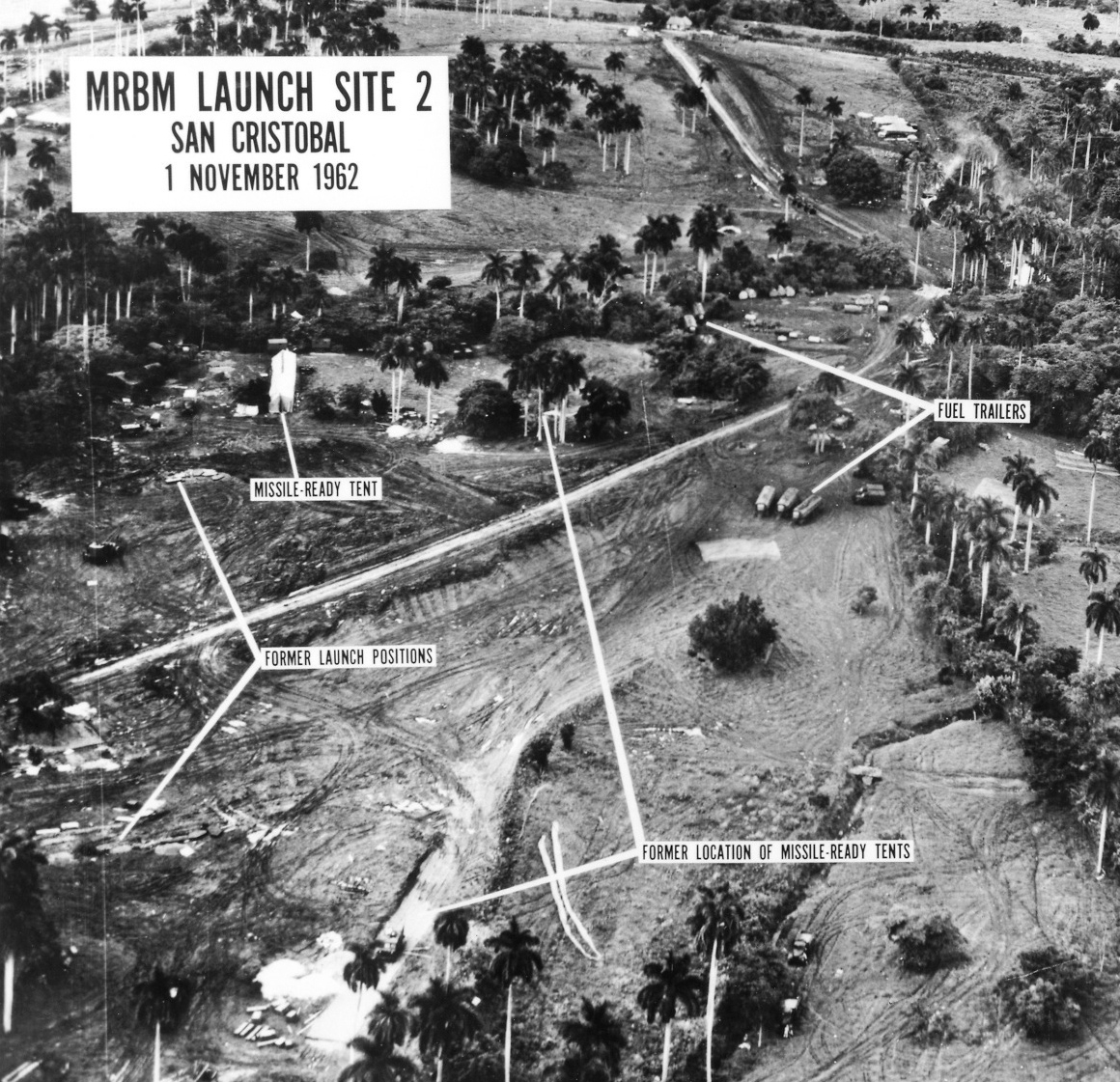
RF-101 Voodoo reconnaissance photograph of the MRBM launch site in San Cristóbal, Cuba (1962)

In 1960, the United States developed its first Single Integrated Operational Plan, a range of targeting options, and described launch procedures and target sets against which nuclear weapons would be launched, variants of which were in use from 1961 to 2003. That year also saw the start of the Missile Defense Alarm System, an American system of 12 early-warning satellites that provided limited notice of Soviet intercontinental ballistic missile launches between 1960 and 1966. The Ballistic Missile Early Warning System was completed in 1964.

The most powerful atomic bomb ever made, the Tsar Bomba, was tested by the Soviets on October 30, 1961. It was 50 megatons, or equal to 50 million tons of regular explosives. A complex and worrisome situation developed in 1962, in what is called the Cuban Missile Crisis. The Soviet Union placed medium-range ballistic missiles 90 miles (140 km) from the United States, possibly as a direct response to American Jupiter missiles placed in Turkey. After intense negotiations, the Soviets ended up removing the missiles from Cuba and decided to institute a massive weapons-building program of their own. In exchange, the United States dismantled its launch sites in Turkey, although this was done secretly and not publicly revealed for over two decades. First Secretary Nikita Khrushchev did not even reveal this part of the agreement when he came under fire by political opponents for mishandling the crisis. Communication delays during the crisis led to the establishment of the Moscow–Washington hotline to allow reliable, direct communications between the two nuclear powers.

By the late 1960s, the number of ICBMs and warheads was so high on both sides that it was believed that both the United States and the Soviet Union were capable of completely destroying the infrastructure and a large proportion of the population of the other country. Thus, by some western game theorists, a balance of power system known as mutually assured destruction (or MAD) came into being. It was thought that no full-scale exchange between the powers would result in an outright winner, with at best one side emerging the pyrrhic victor. Thus both sides were deterred from risking the initiation of a direct confrontation, instead being forced to engage in lower-intensity proxy wars.

During this decade the People's Republic of China began to build subterranean infrastructure such as the Underground Project 131 following the Sino-Soviet split.

One drawback of the MAD doctrine was the possibility of a nuclear war occurring without either side intentionally striking first. Early Warning Systems (EWS) were notoriously error-prone. For example, on 78 occasions in 1979 alone, a "missile display conference" was called to evaluate detections that were "potentially threatening to the North American continent". Some of these were trivial errors and were spotted quickly, but several went to more serious levels. On September 26, 1983, Stanislav Petrov received convincing indications of an American first strike launch against the Soviet Union, but positively identified the warning as a false alarm. Though it is unclear what role Petrov's actions played in preventing a nuclear war during this incident, he has been honored by the United Nations for his actions.

United States LGM-30 Minuteman ICBM nuclear weapon system and silo operational development, 1974.

Similar incidents happened many times in the United States, due to failed computer chips, misidentifications of large flights of geese, test programs, and bureaucratic failures to notify early warning military personnel of legitimate launches of test or weather missiles. For many years, the U.S. Air Force's strategic bombers were kept airborne on a daily rotating basis "around the clock" (see Operation Chrome Dome), until the number and severity of accidents, the 1968 Thule Air Base B-52 crash in particular, persuaded policymakers it was not worthwhile.

=== 1970s ===
Israel responded to the Arab Yom Kippur War attack on 6 October 1973 by assembling 13 nuclear weapons in a tunnel under the Negev desert when Syrian tanks were sweeping in across the Golan Heights. On 8 October 1973, Israeli Prime Minister Golda Meir authorized Defense Minister Moshe Dayan to activate the 13 Israeli nuclear warheads and distribute them to Israeli air force units, with the intent that they be used if Israel began to be overrun.

On 24 October 1973, as US President Richard Nixon was preoccupied with the Watergate scandal, Henry Kissinger ordered a DEFCON-3 alert preparing American B-52 nuclear bombers for war. Intelligence reports indicated that the USSR was preparing to defend Egypt in its Yom Kippur War with Israel. It had become apparent that if Israel had dropped nuclear weapons on Egypt or Syria, as it prepared to do, then the USSR would have retaliated against Israel, with the US then committed to providing Israeli assistance, possibly escalating to a general nuclear war.

By the late 1970s, people in both the United States and the Soviet Union, along with the rest of the world, had been living with the concept of mutual assured destruction (MAD) for about a decade, and it became deeply ingrained into the psyche and popular culture of those countries.

On May 18, 1974, India conducted its first nuclear test in the Pokhran test range. The name of the operation was Smiling Buddha, and India termed the test as a "peaceful nuclear explosion."

The Soviet Duga early warning over-the-horizon radar system was made operational in 1976. The extremely powerful radio transmissions needed for such a system led to much disruption of civilian shortwave broadcasts, earning it the nickname "Russian Woodpecker".

The idea that any nuclear conflict would eventually escalate was a challenge for military strategists. This challenge was particularly severe for the United States and its NATO allies. It was believed (until the 1970s) that a Soviet tank offensive into Western Europe would quickly overwhelm NATO conventional forces, leading to the necessity of the West escalating to the use of tactical nuclear weapons, one of which was the W-70.

This strategy had one major (and possibly critical) flaw, which was soon realized by military analysts but highly underplayed by the U.S. military: conventional NATO forces in the European theatre of war were far outnumbered by similar Soviet and Warsaw Pact forces, and it was assumed that in case of a major Soviet attack (commonly envisioned as the "Red tanks rolling towards the North Sea" scenario) that NATO—in the face of quick conventional defeat—would soon have no other choice but to resort to tactical nuclear strikes against these forces. Most analysts agreed that once the first nuclear exchange had occurred, escalation to global nuclear war would likely become inevitable. The Warsaw Pact's vision of an atomic war between NATO and Warsaw Pact forces was simulated in the top-secret exercise Seven Days to the River Rhine in 1979. The British government exercised their vision of a Soviet nuclear attack with Square Leg in early 1980.

Large hardened nuclear weapon storage areas were built across European countries in anticipation of local US and European forces falling back as the conventional NATO defense from the Soviet Union, named REFORGER, was believed to only be capable of stalling the Soviets for a short time.

=== 1980s ===
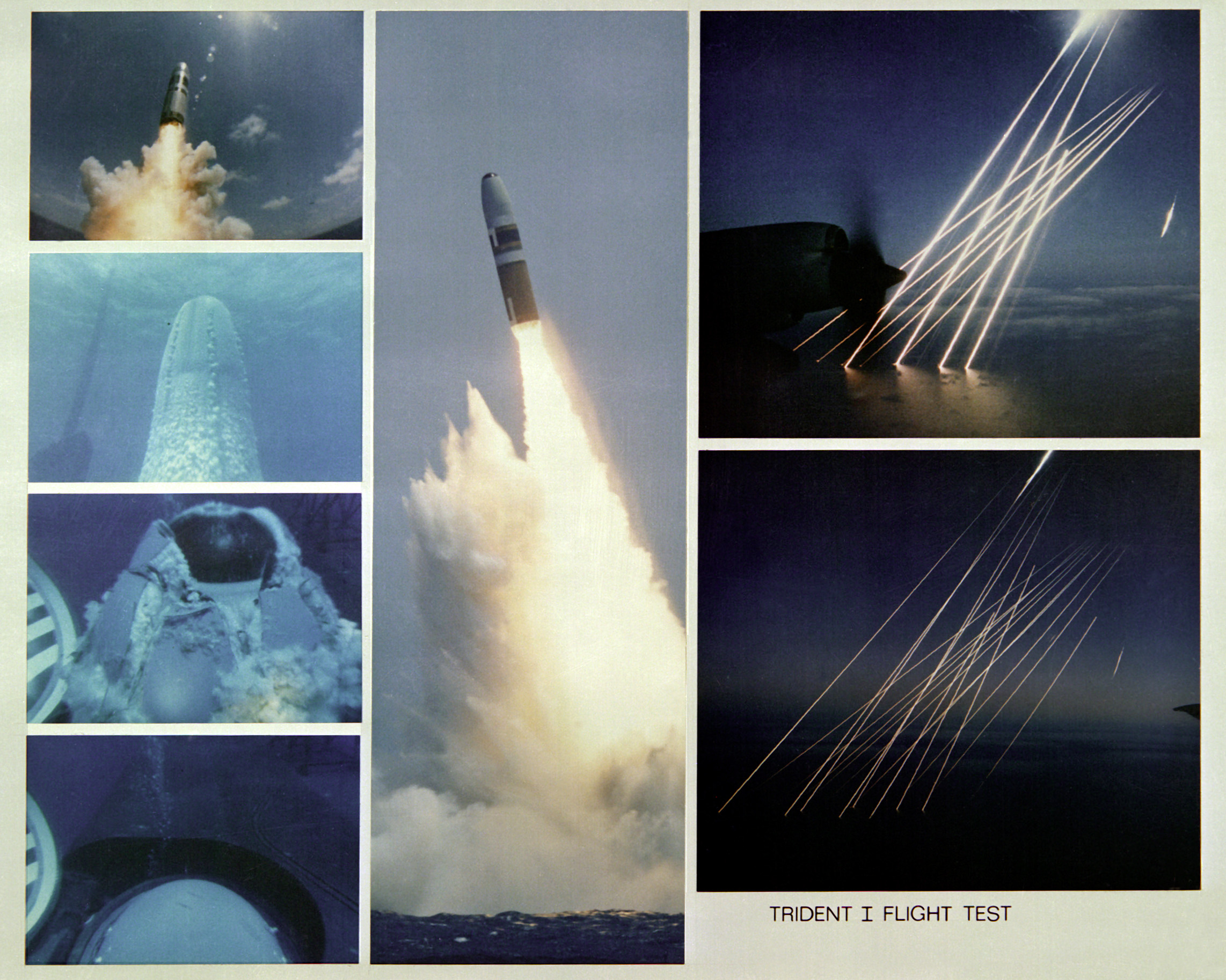
Montage of the launch of a Trident C4 SLBM and the paths of its reentry vehicles

FEMA-estimated primary counterforce targets for Soviet ICBMs in 1990. The resulting fall-out is indicated with the darkest considered as lethal to lesser fall-out yellow zones.

In the late 1970s and, particularly, during the early 1980s under U.S. President Ronald Reagan, the United States renewed its commitment to a more powerful military, which required a large increase in spending on U.S. military programs. These programs, which were originally part of the defense budget of U.S. President Jimmy Carter, included spending on conventional and nuclear weapons systems. Under Reagan, defensive systems like the Strategic Defense Initiative were emphasized as well.

Another major shift in nuclear doctrine was the development and the improvement of the submarine-launched, nuclear-armed, ballistic missile, or SLBM. It was hailed by many military theorists as a weapon that would make nuclear war less likely. SLBMs—which can move with "stealth" (greatly lessened detectability) virtually anywhere in the world—give a nation a "second strike" capability (i.e., after absorbing a "first strike"). Before the advent of the SLBM, thinkers feared that a nation might be tempted to initiate a first strike if it felt confident that such a strike would incapacitate the nuclear arsenal of its enemy, making retaliation impossible. With the advent of SLBMs, no nation could be certain that a first strike would incapacitate its enemy's entire nuclear arsenal. To the contrary, it would have to fear a near-certain retaliatory second strike from SLBMs. Thus, a first strike was a much less feasible (or desirable) option, and a deliberately initiated nuclear war was thought to be less likely to start.

However, it was soon realized that submarines could approach enemy coastlines undetected and decrease the warning time (the time between detection of the missile launch and the impact of the missile) from as much as half an hour to possibly under three minutes. This effect was especially significant to the United States, Britain and China, whose capitals of Washington D.C., London, and Beijing all lay within 100 miles (160 km) of their coasts. Moscow was much more secure from this type of threat, due to its considerable distance from the sea. This greatly increased the credibility of a "surprise first strike" by one faction and (theoretically) made it possible to knock out or disrupt the chain of command of a target nation before any counterstrike could be ordered (known as a "decapitation strike"). It strengthened the notion that a nuclear war could possibly be "won", resulting not only in greatly increased tensions and increasing calls for fail-deadly control systems, but also in a dramatic increase in military spending. The submarines and their missile systems were very expensive, and one fully equipped nuclear-powered and nuclear-armed missile submarine could cost more than the entire GNP of a developing country. It was also calculated, however, that the greatest cost came in the development of both sea- and land-based anti-submarine defenses and in improving and strengthening the "chain of command", and as a result, military spending skyrocketed.

South Africa developed a nuclear weapon capability during the 1970s and early 1980s. It was operational for a brief period before being dismantled in the early 1990s.

According to the 1980 United Nations report General and Complete Disarmament: Comprehensive Study on Nuclear Weapons: Report of the Secretary-General, it was estimated that there were a total of about 40,000 nuclear warheads in existence at that time, with a potential combined explosive yield of approximately 13,000 megatons. By comparison, the largest volcanic eruption in recorded history when the volcano Mount Tambora erupted in 1815—turning 1816 into the Year Without A Summer due to the levels of global dimming sulfate aerosols and ash expelled—it exploded with a force of roughly 33 billion tons of TNT or 33,000 megatons of TNT this is about 2.2 million Hiroshima Bombs, and ejected 175 km^{3} (42 cu mi) of mostly rock/tephra, that included 120 million tonnes of sulfur dioxide as an upper estimate. A larger eruption, approximately 74,000 years ago, in Mount Toba produced 2,800 km^{3} (670 cu mi) of tephra, forming lake Toba, and produced an estimated 6,000 million tonnes (6.6×10^{9} short tons) of sulfur dioxide. The explosive energy of the eruption may have been as high as equivalent to 20,000,000 megatons (Mt) of TNT, while the asteroid created Chicxulub impact, that is connected with the extinction of the dinosaurs corresponds to at least 70,000,000 Mt of energy, which is roughly 7000 times the maximum arsenal of the US and Soviet Union.

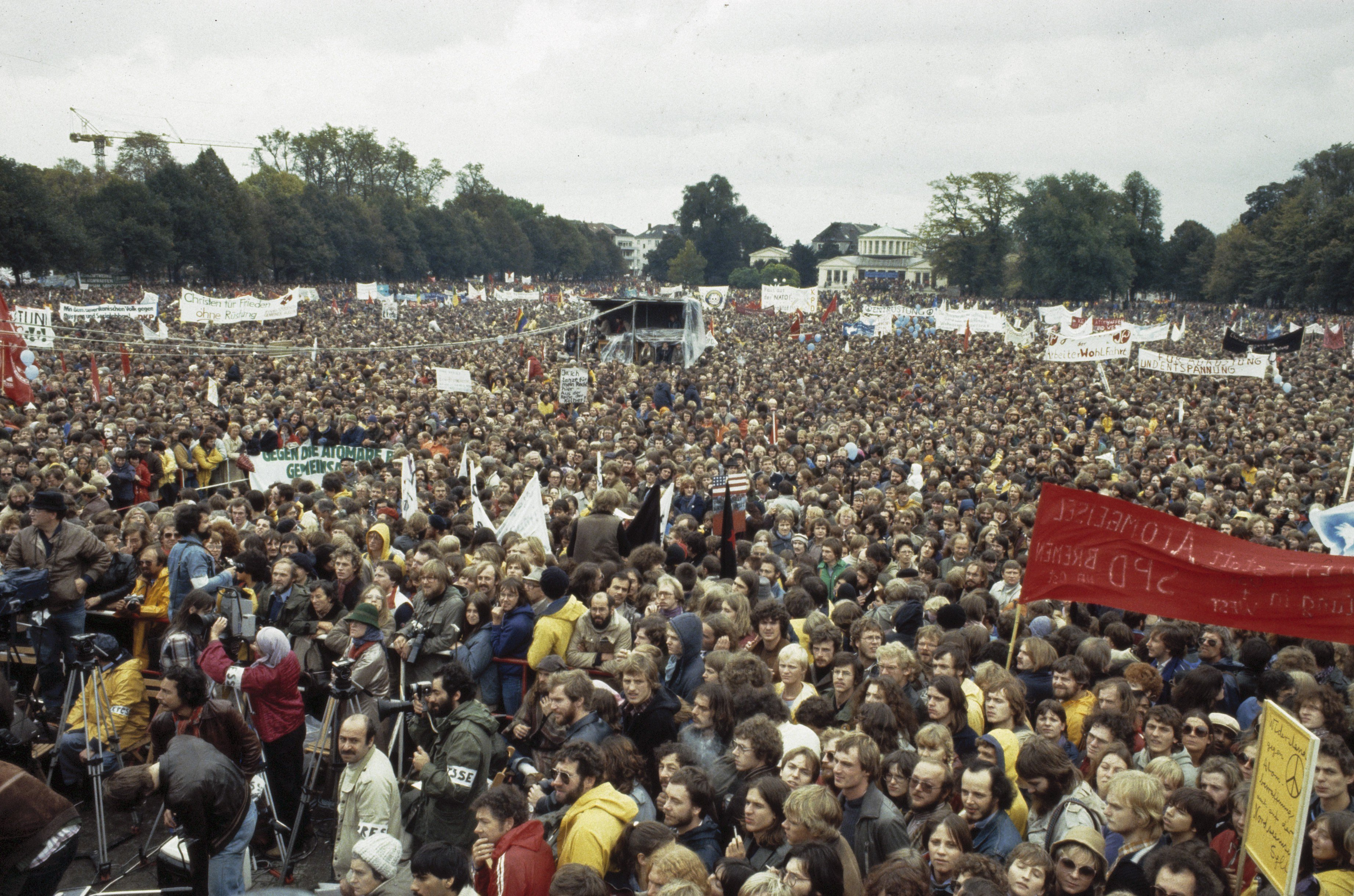
Protest against the deployment of Pershing II missiles in Europe, Bonn, West Germany, 1981

However, comparisons with supervolcanoes are more misleading than helpful due to the different aerosols released, the likely air burst fuzing height of nuclear weapons and the globally scattered location of these potential nuclear detonations all being in contrast to the singular and subterranean nature of a supervolcanic eruption. Moreover, assuming the entire world stockpile of weapons were grouped together, it would be difficult, due to the nuclear fratricide effect, to ensure the individual weapons would go off all at once. Nonetheless, many people believe that a full-scale nuclear war would result, through the nuclear winter effect, in the human extinction, though not all analysts agree on the assumptions that underpin these nuclear winter models.

On 26 September 1983, a Soviet early warning station under the command of Stanislav Petrov falsely detected 5 inbound intercontinental ballistic missiles from the US. Petrov correctly assessed the situation as a false alarm, and hence did not report his finding to his superiors. It is quite possible that his actions prevented "World War III", as the Soviet policy at that time was immediate nuclear response upon discovering inbound ballistic missiles.

The world came unusually close to nuclear war in November 1983 when the Soviet Union thought that the NATO military exercise Able Archer 83 was a ruse or "cover-up" to begin a nuclear first strike. The Soviets responded by raising readiness and preparing their nuclear arsenal for immediate use. Soviet fears of an attack ceased once the exercise concluded without incident.

=== Post-Cold War ===
Although the dissolution of the Soviet Union ended the Cold War in 1991 and greatly reduced the political tensions between the United States and Russia, the Soviet Union's formal successor state, both countries remained in a "nuclear stand-off" due to the continuing presence of a very large number of deliverable nuclear warheads on both sides. Additionally, the end of the Cold War led the United States to become increasingly concerned with the development of nuclear technology by other nations outside of the former Soviet Union. In 1995, a branch of the U.S. Strategic Command produced an outline of forward-thinking strategies in the document "Essentials of Post–Cold War Deterrence".

In 1995, a Black Brant sounding rocket launched from the Andøya Space Center caused a high alert in Russia, known as the Norwegian Rocket Incident. The Russians thought it might be a nuclear missile launched from an American submarine.

In 1996, a Russian continuity of government facility, Kosvinsky Mountain, which is believed to be a counterpart to the US Cheyenne Mountain Complex, was completed. It was designed to resist US earth-penetrating nuclear warheads, and is believed to host the Russian Strategic Rocket Forces alternate command post, a post for the general staff built to compensate for the vulnerability of older Soviet era command posts in the Moscow region. In spite of this, the primary command posts for the Strategic Rocket Forces remains Kuntsevo in Moscow and the secondary is the Kosvinsky Mountain in the Ural Mountains. The timing of the Kosvinsky facilities completion date is regarded as one explanation for U.S. interest in a new nuclear "bunker buster" Earth-penetrating warhead and the declaration of the deployment of the B-61 mod 11 in 1997; Kosvinsky is protected by about 1000 feet of granite.

UN vote on adoption of the Treaty on the Prohibition of Nuclear Weapons on 7 July 2017 Yes No Did not vote

As a consequence of the September 11 attacks, American forces immediately increased their readiness to the highest level in 28 years, closing the blast doors of the NORAD's Cheyenne Mountain Operations Center for the first time due to a non-exercise event. But unlike similar increases during the Cold War, Russia immediately decided to stand down a large military exercise in the Arctic region, in order to minimize the risk of incidents, rather than following suit.

The former chair of the United Nations disarmament committee stated that there are more than 16,000 strategic and tactical nuclear weapons ready for deployment and another 14,000 in storage, with the U.S. having nearly 7,000 ready for use and 3,000 in storage, and Russia having about 8,500 ready for use and 11,000 in storage. In addition, China is thought to possess about 400 nuclear weapons, Britain about 200, France about 350, India about 80–100, and Pakistan 100–110. North Korea is confirmed as having nuclear weapons, though it is not known how many, with most estimates between 1 and 10. Israel is also widely believed to possess usable nuclear weapons. NATO has stationed about 480 American nuclear weapons in Belgium, the Netherlands, Italy, Germany, and Turkey, and several other nations are thought to be in pursuit of an arsenal of their own.

Pakistan's nuclear policy was significantly affected by the 1965 war with India. The 1971 war and India's nuclear program played a role in Pakistan's decision to go nuclear. India and Pakistan both decided not to participate in the NPT. Pakistan's nuclear policy became fixated on India because India refused to join the Non-proliferation Treaty and remained open to nuclear weapons. Impetus by Indian actions spurred Pakistan's nuclear research. After nuclear weapons construction was started by President Zulfikar Ali Bhutto's command, the chair of Pakistan Atomic Energy Commission Usmani quit in objection. The 1999 war between Pakistan and India occurred after both acquired nuclear weapons. It is believed by some that nuclear weapons are the reason a big war has not broken out in the subcontinent. India and Pakistan still have a risk of nuclear conflict on the issue of war over Kashmir. Nuclear capability deliverable by sea were claimed by Pakistan in 2012. The aim was to achieve a "minimum credible deterrence". Pakistan's nuclear program culminated in the tests at Chagai. One of the aims of Pakistan's programs is fending off potential annexation and maintaining independence.

A key development in nuclear warfare throughout the 2000s and early 2010s is the proliferation of nuclear weapons to the developing world, with India and Pakistan both publicly testing several nuclear devices, and North Korea conducting an underground nuclear test on October 9, 2006. The U.S. Geological Survey measured a 4.2 magnitude earthquake in the area where the North Korean test is said to have occurred. A further test was announced by the North Korean government on May 25, 2009. Iran, meanwhile, has embarked on a nuclear program which, while officially for civilian purposes, has come under close scrutiny by the United Nations and many individual states.

Recent studies undertaken by the CIA cite the enduring India-Pakistan conflict as the one "flash point" most likely to escalate into a nuclear war. During the Kargil War in 1999, Pakistan came close to using its nuclear weapons in case the conventional military situation underwent further deterioration. Pakistan's foreign minister had even warned that it would "use any weapon in our arsenal", hinting at a nuclear strike against India. The statement was condemned by the international community, with Pakistan denying it later on. This conflict remains the only war (of any sort) between two declared nuclear powers. The 2001-2002 India-Pakistan standoff again stoked fears of nuclear war between the two countries. Despite these very serious and relatively recent threats, relations between India and Pakistan have been improving somewhat over the last few years. However, with the November 26, 2008 Mumbai terror attacks, tensions again worsened.

External image
- A geopolitical example of nuclear strike plan of ROC Army in Kinmen history. Effective Radius: 10 km; Pop.: 1.06 million

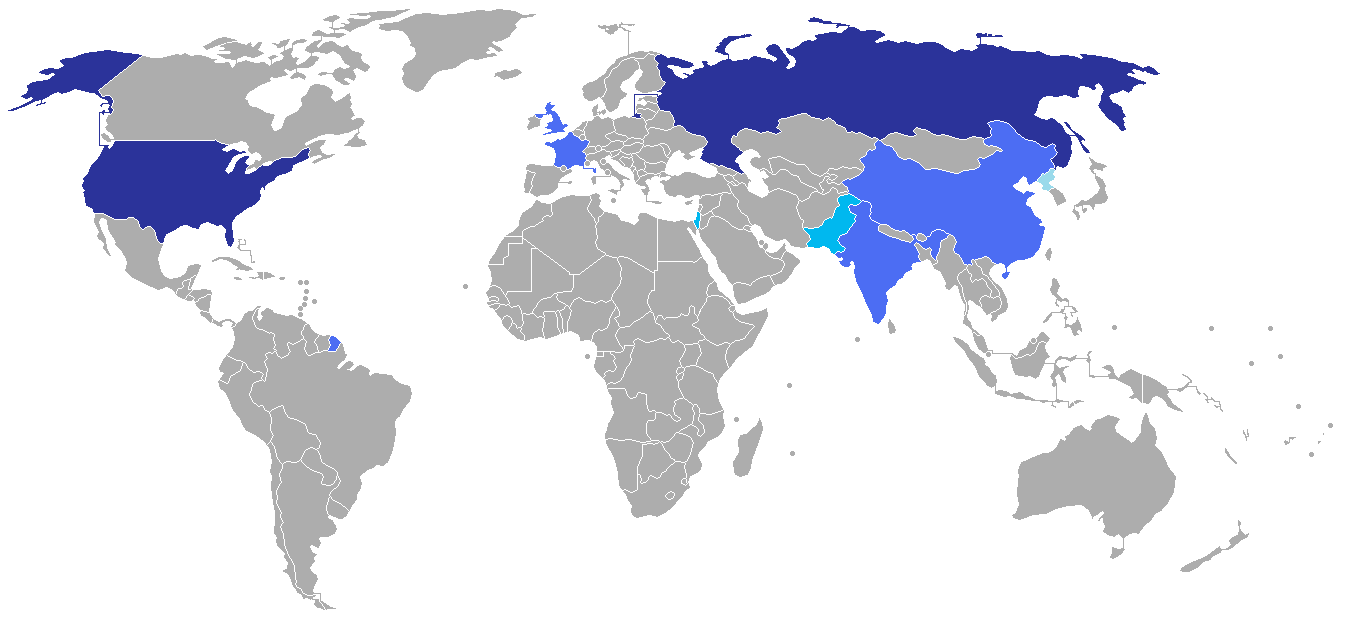
Large stockpile with global range (dark blue), smaller stockpile with global range (medium blue), small stockpile with regional range (light blue).

Another potential geopolitical issue that is considered particularly worrisome by military analysts is a possible conflict between the United States and the People's Republic of China over Taiwan. Although economic forces are thought to have reduced the possibility of a military conflict, there remains concern about the increasing military buildup of China (China is rapidly increasing its naval capacity), and that any move toward Taiwan independence could potentially spin out of control.

Israel is thought to possess somewhere between one hundred and four hundred nuclear warheads. It has been asserted that the Dolphin-class submarines which Israel received from Germany have been adapted to carry nuclear-armed Popeye cruise missiles, so as to give Israel a second strike capability. Israel has been involved in wars with its neighbors in the Middle East (and with other "non-state actors" in Lebanon and Palestine) on numerous prior occasions, and its small geographic size and population could mean that, in the event of future wars, the Israel Defense Forces might have very little time to react to an invasion or other major threat. Such a situation could escalate to nuclear warfare very quickly in some scenarios.

On March 7, 2013, North Korea threatened the United States with a pre-emptive nuclear strike. On April 9, North Korea urged foreigners to leave South Korea, stating that both countries were on the verge of nuclear war. On April 12, North Korea stated that a nuclear war was unavoidable. The country declared Japan as its first target.

In 2014, when Russia-United States and Russia-NATO relations worsened over the Annexation of Crimea, the Russian state-owned television channel Russia 1 stated that "Russia is the only country in the world that is really capable of turning the USA into radioactive ash." U.S. Secretary of Defense Ash Carter considered proposing deployment of ground-launched cruise missiles in Europe that could pre-emptively destroy Russian weapons.

In August 2017, North Korea warned that it might launch mid-range ballistic missiles into waters within 18 to 24 miles (29 to 39 km) of Guam, following an exchange of threats between the governments of North Korea and the United States. Escalating tensions between North Korea and the United States, including threats by both countries that they could use nuclear weapons against one another, prompted a heightened state of readiness in Hawaii. The perceived ballistic missile threat broadcast all over Hawaii on 13 January 2018 was a false missile alarm.

In October 2018, the former Soviet leader Mikhail Gorbachev commented that U.S. withdrawal from the Intermediate-Range Nuclear Forces Treaty is "not the work of a great mind" and that "a new arms race has been announced".

In early 2019, more than 90% of world's 13,865 nuclear weapons were owned by Russia and the United States.

In 2019, Vladimir Putin warned that Russia would deploy nuclear missiles in Europe if the United States deployed intermediate-range nuclear missiles there. Journalist Dmitry Kiselyov listed the targets in the United States, which includes The Pentagon, Camp David, Fort Ritchie, McClellan Air Force Base, and Jim Creek Naval Radio Station. Kremlin spokesperson Dmitry Peskov denies the existence of the target list.

On February 24, 2022, in a televised address preceding the start of the Russo-Ukrainian war (2022–present), Russian President Vladimir Putin stated that Russia "is today one of the most powerful nuclear powers in the world... No one should have any doubts that a direct attack on our country will lead to defeat and dire consequences for any potential aggressor." Later in the same speech, Putin stated: "Now a few important, very important words for those who may be tempted to intervene in ongoing events. Whoever tries to hinder us, and even more so to create threats for our country, for our people, should know that Russia's response will be immediate and will lead you to such consequences that you have never experienced in your history." On February 27, 2022, Putin publicly put his nuclear forces on alert, stating that NATO powers had made "aggressive statements". On April 14, The New York Times reported comments by CIA director William Burns, who said "potential desperation" could lead President Putin to order the use of tactical nuclear weapons. On September 21, 2022, days before declaring the annexation of additional parts of Ukraine, Putin claimed in a national television address that high NATO officials had made statements about the possibility of "using nuclear weapons of mass destruction against Russia", and stated "if the territorial integrity of our country is threatened, we will certainly use all the means at our disposal to protect Russia and our people... It's not a bluff." NBC News characterized Putin's statements as a "thinly veiled" threat that Putin was willing to risk nuclear conflict if necessary to win the war with Ukraine. Hans M. Kristensen, director of the Nuclear Information Project at the Federation of American Scientists, stated that "if you start detonating nuclear weapons in the [battlefield] you potentially get radioactive fallout that you can't control — it could rain over your own troops as well, so it might not be an advantage to do that in the field."

According to researcher Ryan Snyder the lethality of long-range precision conventional weapons may now possess lethalities against strategic missile silos comparable to those of nuclear-armed ballistic missiles.

According to a peer-reviewed study published in the journal Nature Food in August 2022, a full-scale nuclear war between the U.S. and Russia would kill 360 million people directly, with a further 5 billion people dying from starvation. More than 2 billion people would die from a smaller-scale nuclear war between India and Pakistan.

In March 2026, U.S. Director of National Intelligence Tulsi Gabbard noted the threat of nuclear-capable weapons from adversarial countries, stating that "Russia, China, North Korea, Iran, and Pakistan have been researching and developing an array of novel, advanced, or traditional missile delivery systems with nuclear and conventional payloads that put our homeland within range." Further, she cautioned that China and Russia had systems "capable of penetrating or bypassing U.S. missile defenses," while North Korea's missiles could already reach U.S. soil, and Pakistan's missiles "potentially" could as well.

== Survival ==
The predictions of the effects of a major countervalue nuclear exchange include millions of city dweller deaths within a short period of time. Some 1980s predictions had gone further and argued that a full-scale nuclear war could eventually bring about human extinction. Such predictions, sometimes but not always based on total war with nuclear arsenals at Cold War highs, received contemporary criticism. On the other hand, some 1980s governmental predictions, such as FEMA's CRP-2B and NATO's Carte Blanche, have received criticism from groups such as the Federation of American Scientists for being overly optimistic. CRP-2B, for instance, predicted that 80% of Americans would survive a nuclear exchange with the Soviet Union, a figure that neglected nuclear war's impacts on healthcare infrastructure, the food supply, and the ecosystem and assumed that all major cities could be successfully evacuated within 3–5 days. A number of Cold War publications advocated preparations that could purportedly enable a large proportion of civilians to survive even a total nuclear war. Among these is Nuclear War Survival Skills.

To avoid injury and death from a nuclear weapon's heat flash and blast effects, the two most common causes of injury from nuclear weapons, schoolchildren were taught to duck and cover by the early Cold War film of the same name. Such advice is once again being given in case of nuclear terrorist attacks.

Prussian blue, or "Radiogardase", is stockpiled in the US, along with potassium iodide and DTPA, as pharmaceuticals useful in treating internal exposure to harmful radioisotopes in fallout.

Publications on adapting to a changing diet and supplying nutritional food sources following a nuclear war, with particular focus on agricultural radioecology, include Nutrition in the postattack environment by the RAND corporation.

The British government developed a public alert system for use during a nuclear attack with the expectation of a four-minute warning before detonation. The United States expected a warning time of anywhere from half an hour (for land-based missiles) to less than three minutes (for submarine-based weapons). Many countries maintain plans for continuity of government following a nuclear attack or similar disasters. These range from a designated survivor, intended to ensure the survival of some form of government leadership, to the Soviet Dead Hand system, which allows for retaliation even if all Soviet leadership were destroyed. Nuclear submarines are given letters of last resort: orders on what action to take in the event that an enemy nuclear strike has destroyed the government.

A number of other countries around the world have taken significant efforts to maximize their survival prospects in the event of large calamities, both natural and manmade. For example, metro stations in Pyongyang, North Korea, were constructed 110 metres (360 ft) below ground, and were designed to serve as nuclear shelters in the event of war, with each station entrance built with thick steel blast doors. An example of privately funded fallout shelters is the Ark Two Shelter in Ontario, Canada, and autonomous shelters have been constructed with an emphasis on post-war networking and reconstruction. In Switzerland, the majority of homes have an underground blast and fallout shelter. The country has an overcapacity of such shelters and can accommodate slightly more than the nation's population size.

While the nuclear fallout shelters described above are the ideal long-term protection methods against dangerous radiation exposure in the event of a nuclear catastrophe, it is also necessary to have mobile protection equipment for medical and security personnel to safely assist in containment, evacuation, and many other necessary public safety objectives which ensue as a result of nuclear detonation. There are many basic shielding strategies used to protect against the deposition of radioactive material from external radiation environments. Respirators that protect against internal deposition are used to prevent the inhalation and ingestion of radioactive material and dermal protective equipment which is used to protect against the deposition of material on external structures like skin, hair, and clothing. While these protection strategies do slightly reduce the exposure, they provide almost no protection from externally penetrating gamma radiation, which is the cause of acute radiation syndrome and can be extremely lethal in high dosages. Naturally, shielding the entire body from high-energy gamma radiation is optimal, but the required mass to provide adequate attenuation makes functional movement nearly impossible.

Recent scientific studies have shown the feasibility of partial body shielding as a viable protection strategy against externally penetrating gamma radiation. The concept is based in providing sufficient attenuation to only the most radio-sensitive organs and tissues in efforts to defer the onset of acute radiation syndrome, the most immediate threat to humans from high doses of gamma radiation. Acute radiation syndrome is a result of irreversible bone marrow damage from high-energy radiation exposure. Due to the regenerative property of hematopoietic stem cells found in bone marrow, it is only necessary to protect enough bone marrow to repopulate the exposed areas of the body with the shielded supply. Because 50% of the body's supply of bone marrow is stored in the pelvic region which is also in close proximity to other radio-sensitive organs in the abdomen, the lower torso is a logical choice as the primary target for protection.

== In fiction and cinema ==
Nuclear warfare and weapons are staple elements of speculative fiction.

The War Game by Peter Watkins is a docudrama depicting a hypothetical nuclear attack on Britain.

Fail Safe, directed by Sidney Lumet, is a 1964 Cold War techno-thriller presenting a dramatization of an unintended nuclear escalation triggered by a mechanical failure.

== See also ==
- Air Force Global Strike Command
- Basic Encyclopedia
- Broken-backed war theory
- Global catastrophic risk
- International Luxembourg Forum on Preventing Nuclear Catastrophe
- List of CBRN warfare forces
- List of states with nuclear weapons
- Mount Yamantau
- Nuclear blackout
- Nuclear briefcase
- Nuclear weapons and the United States
- Nuclear weapons debate
- People's Liberation Army Rocket Force
- Prevention of nuclear catastrophe
- Transition to war
- Treaty on the Non-Proliferation of Nuclear Weapons
