= Prompt launch =

Nuclear combat readiness state

Prompt-launch status and delayed launch status are generic classifications of combat readiness applied to describe nuclear-armed missiles.

== Prompt-launch vs delayed launch ==
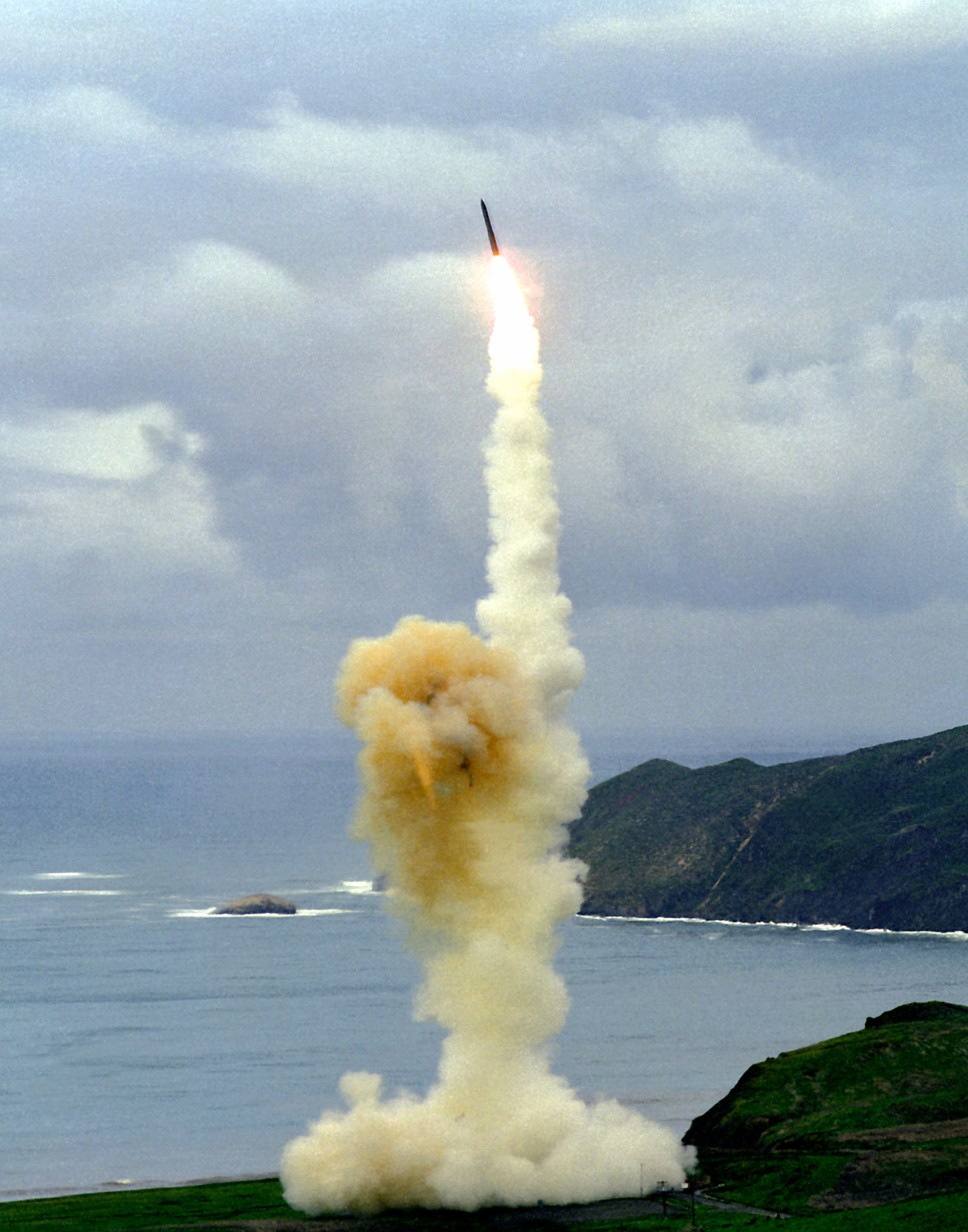
Almost all deployed U.S. nuclear-armed missiles, such as the Minuteman III (pictured), are kept at a prompt-launch status.

Prompt-launch, colloquially known as "hair trigger alert", is a state of combat readiness during which nuclear-armed missiles can be launched immediately upon receipt of a firing order, with no or minimal preparations.

Keeping weapons systems at a prompt-launch status allows a nation-state to launch on warning, thereby increasing the likelihood it could successfully retaliate against an attack, or initiate a nuclear first strike without alerting an enemy. Even for states that have proscribed launch on warning or first strike, prompt launch may help guarantee that nuclear-armed missiles which themselves have survived a first strike could actually be fired in a timely manner before being destroyed in follow-on, "mop-up" attacks.

During delayed launch status, nuclear-armed missiles require some type of preparation prior to firing, such as fueling, warhead mounting, or the manual removal of static launch barriers.

In nuclear warfighting strategy, weapons kept at delayed launch status are at risk of being destroyed in their silos in the event of a nuclear first strike by an adversary. Even if weapons survive a first strike, a nation's command and control system may collapse by the time they are readied for firing. A 1993 analysis of future improvements in U.S. command and control predicted the United States government might only be able to continue operating for a few hours after an initial attack and would be unable to manage a "protracted" nuclear war, rendering surviving weapons kept in delayed launch status useless.

Proponents of keeping some or all of a nation's nuclear deterrent at delayed alert status note several benefits, including decreased risk of accidental launch and minimized cost of crewing.

=== SLBMs ===
Submarine-launched ballistic missiles (SLBMs), when deployed aboard ballistic missile submarines, are generally not vulnerable to an enemy's own weapons and may be kept at delayed launch status without risking their future launch potential. However, methods for keeping ICBMs at a delayed launch status, such as warhead-missile separation or placing static launch barriers on silo doors, may not be possible in the case of SLBMs due to the nature of submarine-deployment. Several methods have been proposed by which SLBMs could be kept at a delayed launch status, such as deploying ballistic missile submarines in remote oceanic locations out-of-range of the nation's primary adversary.

== Status by operator ==
Nation	Launch status	Notes	Source
China	Mixed	China maintains as many as 30 ICBMs at a prompt-launch status ready for a first strike or immediate retaliation, however, the majority of its ballistic missiles do not regularly have warheads mounted; warheads for these missiles are stored in a separate location. During periods of heightened international tension, missiles kept at delayed launch status can be mounted with warheads and upgraded to prompt-launch status.	
France	Prompt	The deployed portion of the Strategic Oceanic Force's SLBMs are kept at the equivalent of a prompt-launch status. (Aircraft tasked to the Strategic Air Forces Command have the capability to deliver nuclear weapons in the form of gravity bombs but are not routinely kept on an alert status that would allow them to do so.)	
India	Delayed	All Indian nuclear warheads designed for missile fitting are stored separately from their ballistic missiles, in a delayed launch status.	
Israel	Unknown	At present, very little is known about Israeli nuclear capabilities or warfighting doctrine.	
North Korea	Unknown	At present, very little is known about North Korean nuclear capabilities or warfighting doctrine.	
Pakistan	Delayed	All Pakistani nuclear warheads designed for missile fitting are stored separately from their ballistic missiles, in a delayed launch status.	
Russia	Prompt	Russia keeps almost all of its deployed nuclear-armed missiles at a prompt-launch status.	
United States	Prompt	The United States keeps almost all of its deployed nuclear-armed missiles at a prompt-launch status.	
United Kingdom	Delayed	The United Kingdom keeps just one SSBN on patrol, which carries its entire deployed nuclear arsenal. According to multiple sources, this deployed portion of British nuclear forces probably requires several days advance notice to prepare its weapons for launch.	

== See also ==
- De-alerting
- Nuclear football
