= High-alert nuclear weapon =

A high-alert nuclear weapon commonly refers to a launch-ready ballistic missile that is armed with a nuclear warhead whose launch can be ordered (through the National Command Authority) and executed (via a nuclear command and control system) within 15 minutes. It can include any weapon system capable of delivering a nuclear warhead in this time frame.

Virtually all high-alert nuclear weapons are possessed by the United States and Russia. Both nations use automated command-and-control systems, in conjunction with their early warning radar and/or satellites, to facilitate the rapid launch of their land-based intercontinental ballistic missiles (ICBMs) and some submarine-launched ballistic missiles (SLBMs). Fear of a "disarming" nuclear first strike, which would destroy their command and control systems and nuclear forces, led both nations to develop "launch-on-warning" capability, which requires high-alert nuclear weapons that can launch within 30 minutes of a tactical warning, the nominal flight time of ICBMs traveling between both countries.

A definition of "high-alert" requires no specific explosive power of the weapon carried by the missile or weapon system, but in general, most high-alert missiles are armed with strategic nuclear weapons with yields equal to or greater than 100 kilotons. The United States and Russia have for decades possessed ICBMs and SLBMs that can be launched in only a few minutes.

The U.S. and Russia as of 2008 have a total of 900 missiles and 2581 strategic nuclear warheads on high-alert launch-ready status. The total explosive power of the weapons is about 1185 megatons, or the equivalent explosive power of 1.185 billion tons of TNT.
