= Historical nuclear weapons stockpiles and nuclear tests by country =

This article shows various estimates of the nuclear weapon stockpiles of various countries at various points in time. This article also shows the number of nuclear weapons tests conducted by each country at various points in time.

== Nuclear weapons stockpiles ==
Global nuclear weapons stockpiles (1945–2025)
Country	1945	1950	1955	1960	1965	1970	1975	1980	1985	1990	1995	2000	2005	2014	2020	Projections
United States	2	299	2,422	18,638	31,149	26,008	27,519	23,368	21,392	10,904	10,577	8,360	7,700	7,260	5,800	5,244 (in 2023)
Soviet Union Russia	0	5	200	1,605	6,129	11,643	19,055	30,062	39,197	37,000	27,000	21,500	17,000	7,500	6,375	5,899 (in 2023)
China	0	0	0	0	5	75	180	205	243	232	234	232	235	260	400	1,500 (for 2035)
France	0	0	0	0	32	36	188	250	360	505	500	470	350	300	290	
United Kingdom	0	0	14	42	436	394	492	492	422	422	422	281	281	225	225	260 (up to 2030)
India	0	0	0	0	0	0	0	1	3	7	14	28	44	90-110	150	250-270 (for 2025)
Pakistan	0	0	0	0	0	0	0	0	0	4	13	28	38	100-120	160	150-200 (for 2021)
Israel	0	0	0	0	0	8	20	31	42	53	63	72	80	80	80-90	65-85 (for 2020)
North Korea	0	0	0	0	0	0	0	0	0	0-1	0-2	0-2	8	6-8	30-40	
South Africa	0	0	0	0	0	0	0	0	3	6	0	0	0	0	0	0
Kazakhstan	—	—	—	—	—	—	—	—	—	1,410 (1991)	0	0	0	0	0	0
Ukraine	—	—	—	—	—	—	—	—	—	2,321 (1991)	0	0	0	0	0	0
Belarus	—	—	—	—	—	—	—	—	—	At least 81 (1991)	0	0	0	0	0	0
Lithuania	—	—	—	—	—	—	—	—	—	20-60 (1991)	0	0	0	0	0	0
Worldwide total	2	304	2,636	20,285	37,741	38,164	47,454	54,409	61,662	~51,864	38,823 - 38,825	30,971 - 30,973	25,736	15,811 - 15,853	13,400	

U.S. and Soviet/Russian nuclear weapons stockpiles/inventories from 1945 to 2006. The failing Soviet economy and the dissolution of the country between 1989 and 1991 which marks the end of the Cold War and with it the relaxation of the arms race, brought about a large decrease in both nations' stockpiles. The effects of the Megatons to Megawatts can also be seen in the mid-1990s, continuing Russia's reducing trend. A similar chart focusing solely on quantity of warheads in the multi-megaton range is also available. Moreover, total deployed US and "Russian" strategic weapons increased steadily from the 1980s until the Cold War ended.

The United States nuclear stockpile increased rapidly from 1945, peaked in 1966, and declined after that. By 2012, the United States had several times fewer nuclear weapons than it had in 1966.

The Soviet Union developed its first nuclear weapon in 1949 and increased its nuclear stockpile rapidly until it peaked in 1986 under Mikhail Gorbachev. As Cold War tensions decreased, and after the collapse of the Soviet Union, the Soviet and Russian nuclear stockpile decreased by over 80% between 1986 and 2012.

The United States and Russian nuclear weapons stockpiles are projected to continue decreasing over the next decade.

The United Kingdom became a nuclear power in 1952, and its nuclear arsenal peaked at just under 500 nuclear weapons in 1981. France became a nuclear power in 1960, and French nuclear stockpiles peaked at just over 500 nuclear weapons in 1992. China developed its first nuclear weapon in 1964; its nuclear stockpile increased until the early 1980s, when it stabilized at between 200 and 260. India became a nuclear power in 1974, while Pakistan developed its first nuclear weapon in the 1980s. India and Pakistan currently have around one hundred nuclear weapons each. Pakistan's nuclear stockpile has increased rapidly, and it is speculated that Pakistan might have more nuclear weapons than the United Kingdom within a decade.

South Africa successfully built six nuclear weapons in the 1980s, but dismantled all of them in the early 1990s, shortly before the fall of the apartheid system. So far it is the only nuclear-capable country to give up nuclear weapons, although several members of the Soviet Union did so during the collapse of the Soviet regime.

North Korea joined the nuclear club in 2006 or before. A United States Defense Intelligence Agency report from 1999 projected that both Iran and Iraq would join the nuclear club and have 10-20 nuclear weapons in 2020. However, it is worth pointing out that this report was written before the overthrow of Iraqi dictator Saddam Hussein and before information was released indicating that Iraq had already given up its nuclear weapons program. Even before the U.S. started the nuclear club in 1945, some states (most notably Germany) unsuccessfully attempted to build nuclear weapons.

== Nuclear weapon tests ==
Number of nuclear weapons tests by state (1945–2024)
Country	1945–49	1950–54	1955–59	1960–64	1965–69	1970–74	1975–79	1980–84	1985–89	1990–94	1995–99	2000–04	2005–09	2010–14	2015–19	2020–24	Cumulative total
United States	8	43	145	198	230	136	96	84	71	21	0	0	0	0	0	0	1,032
Soviet Union Russia	1	17	65	147	85	101	126	116	56	1	0	0	0	0	0	0	715
United Kingdom	0	3	18	4	1	1	4	8	4	2	0	0	0	0	0	0	45
France	0	0	0	12	19	32	37	51	41	12	6	0	0	0	0	0	210
China	0	0	0	1	9	6	10	6	2	7	4	0	0	0	0	0	45
Israel	0	0	0	0	0	0	1–3	0	0	0	0	0	0	0	0	0	1–3
India	0	0	0	0	0	1	0	0	0	0	5	0	0	0	0	0	6
Pakistan	0	0	0	0	0	0	0	0	0	0	6	0	0	0	0	0	6
North Korea	0	0	0	0	0	0	0	0	0	0	0	0	2	1	3	0	6
All countries	9	63	228	362	344	277	273	265	174	43	21	0	2	1	3	0	2,065

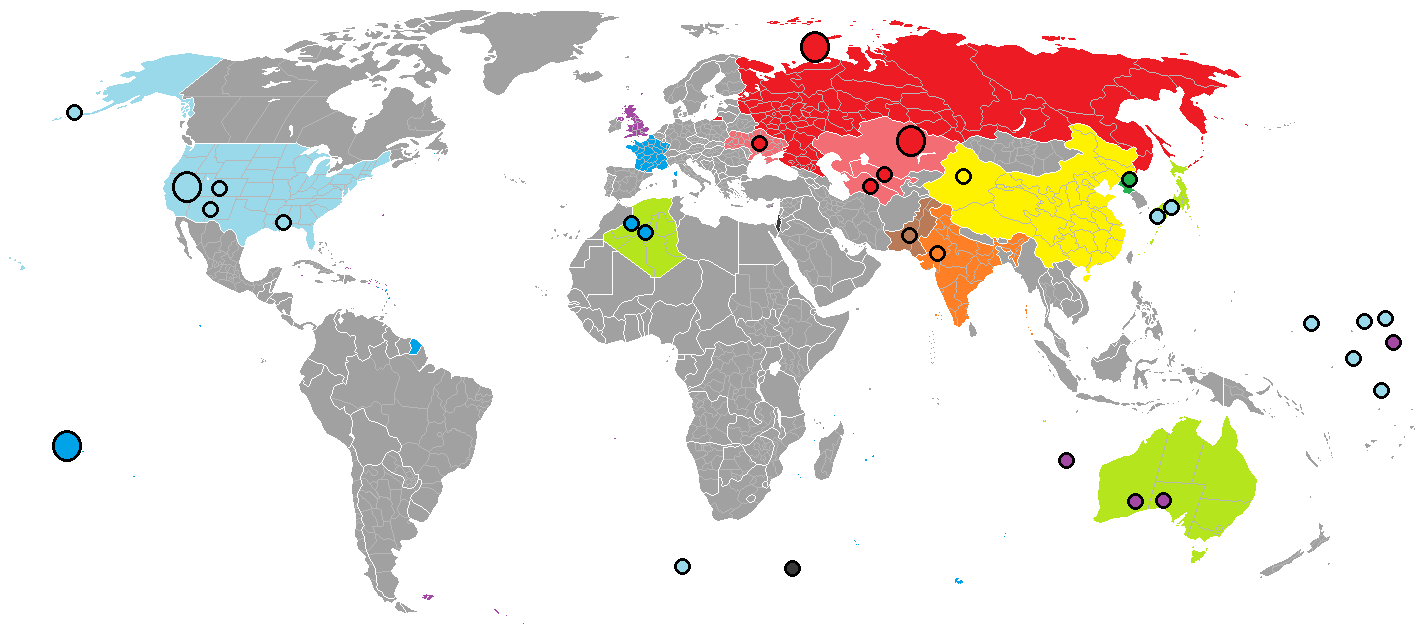
Over 2,000 nuclear explosions have been conducted, in over a dozen different sites around the world. Red Russia/Soviet Union, blue France, light blue United States, violet Britain, black Israel, yellow China, orange India, brown Pakistan, green North Korea and light green (territories exposed to nuclear bombs).

Graph of nuclear testing by year and country

From the first nuclear test in 1945, worldwide nuclear testing increased rapidly until the 1970s, when it peaked. However, there was still a large amount of worldwide nuclear testing until the end of the Cold War in the early 1990s. Afterwards, the Comprehensive Test Ban Treaty was signed and ratified by the major nuclear weapons powers, and the number of worldwide nuclear tests decreased rapidly. India and Pakistan conducted nuclear tests in 1998, but afterwards only North Korea conducted nuclear tests--in 2006, 2009, 2013, twice in 2016, and in 2017.
