= World War III =

Hypothetical future global conflict

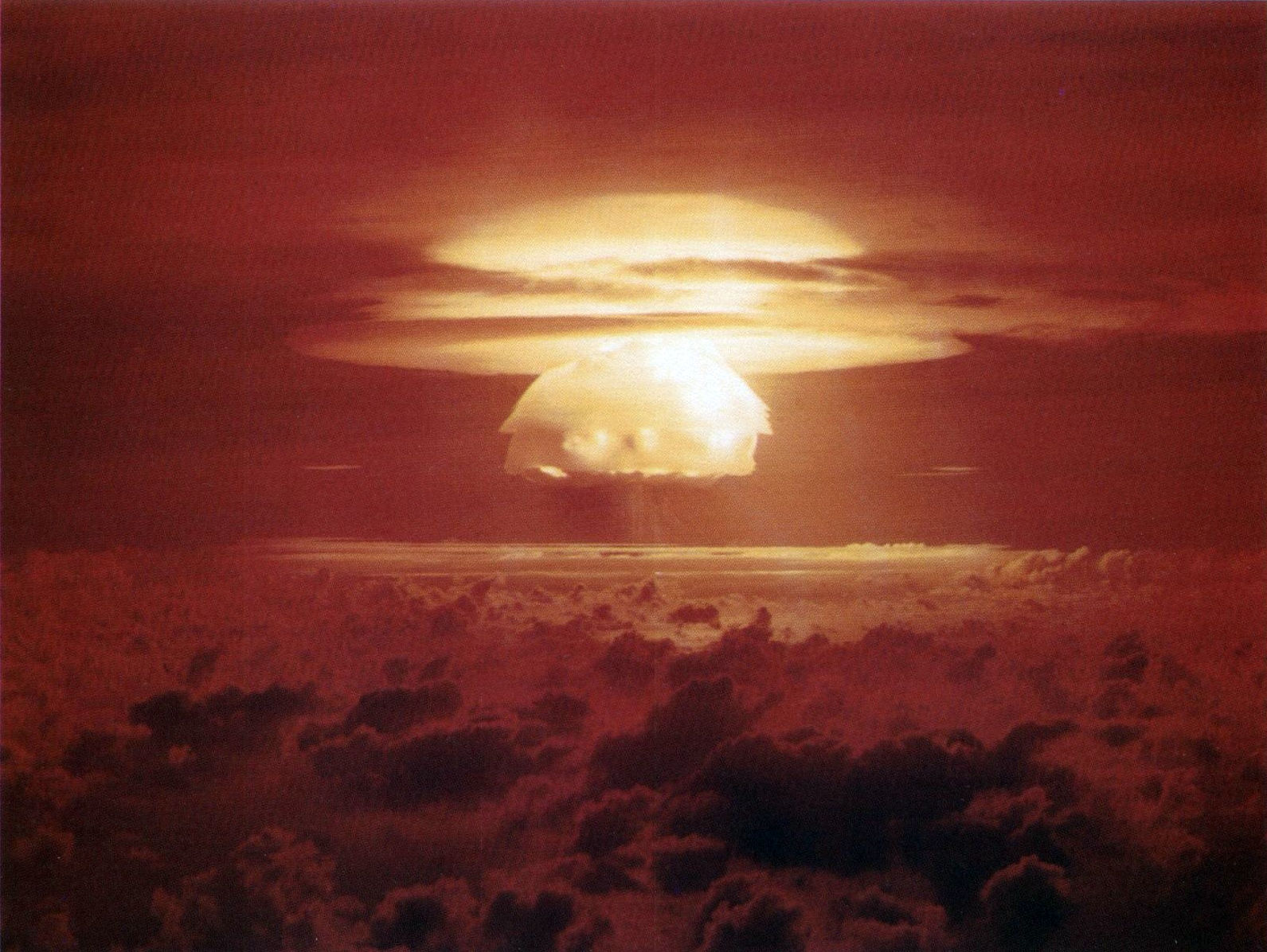
Nuclear warfare is often the focus of World War III scenarios.

World War III, (Note: Often abbreviated as WWIII or WW3) also known as the Third World War, is a hypothetical future global conflict subsequent to World War I (1914–1918) and World War II (1939–1945). It is widely predicted that such a war would involve all of the great powers, like its two predecessors, and the use of nuclear weapons or other weapons of mass destruction, thereby surpassing all prior conflicts in scale, devastation, and loss of life.

World War III was initially synonymous with the escalation of the Cold War (1947–1991) into conflict between the US-led Western Bloc and Soviet-led Eastern Bloc, though the United States and the Soviet Union never directly engaged. Since the United States' development and use of nuclear weapons in the atomic bombings of Hiroshima and Nagasaki at the end of World War II, the risk of a nuclear apocalypse causing widespread destruction and the potential collapse of modern civilization or human extinction has been central in speculation and fiction about World War III. The Soviet Union's development of nuclear weapons in 1949 spurred the nuclear arms race and was followed by several other countries.

Regional proxy wars, including the Korean War (1950–1953), Vietnam War (1955–1975), and Soviet–Afghan War (1979–1989), while significant, did not lead to a full-scale global conflict. Such a conflict was planned for by military and civil personnel around the world, with scenarios ranging from conventional warfare to limited or total nuclear warfare. The certainty of escalation from one stage to the next was extensively debated. For example, the Eisenhower administration promulgated a policy of massive retaliation with nuclear forces in response to a minor conventional attack. After the Cuban Missile Crisis in 1962, which brought the U.S. and Soviet Union to the brink of war, the strategic doctrine of mutually assured destruction, which held that a full-scale nuclear war would annihilate all parties, became widely accepted. At the 1985 Geneva summit, U.S. and Soviet leaders first jointly stated "a nuclear war cannot be won and must never be fought". Advocates of deterrence theory hold that nuclear weapons prevent World War III–like great power conflict, while advocates of nuclear disarmament hold that their risks far outweigh this.

Since the end of the Cold War in 1991, speculation about World War III has shifted toward emerging threats, including terrorism and cyberwarfare. Great power competition has been renewed between the United States, China, and Russia, sometimes termed a Second Cold War. Various conflicts, most significantly the current phase of the Russo-Ukrainian war (2022–present), the Middle Eastern crisis (2023–present) which includes the 2026 Iran war, and rising tensions over the status of Taiwan, have been perceived as flashpoints for World War III.

== Etymology ==
=== Time magazine ===
Time magazine was an early adopter, if not originator, of the term "World War III". The first usage appears in its 3 November 1941 issue (preceding the Japanese attack on Pearl Harbor on 7 December 1941) under its "National Affairs" section and entitled "World War III?" about Nazi refugee Hermann Rauschning, who had just arrived in the United States and his belief that there would be a pause in fighting before Hitler would attempt to invade Great Britain. In its 22 March 1943, issue under its "Foreign News" section, Time reused the same title "World War III?" about statements by then–US Vice President Henry A. Wallace: "We shall decide sometime in 1943 or 1944 ... whether to plant the seeds of World War III" in reference to a potential war between the United States and the Soviet Union. Time continued to entitle with or mention in stories the term "World War III" for the rest of the decade and onwards: 1944, 1945, 1946 ("bacterial warfare"), 1947, and 1948. Time persists in using this term, for example, in a 2015 book review entitled "This Is What World War III Will Look Like".

== Military plans ==
Military strategists have used war games to prepare for various war scenarios and to determine the most appropriate strategies. War games were utilized for World War I and World War II.

=== Operation Unthinkable ===
In April–May 1945, the British Armed Forces developed Operation Unthinkable, thought to be the first scenario of the Third World War. Its primary goal was "to impose upon Russia the will of the United States and the British Empire". British prime minister Winston Churchill was concerned that, with the enormous size of Soviet Red Army forces deployed in Central and Eastern Europe at the end of World War II and the perceived unreliability of the Soviet leader Joseph Stalin, there was a serious threat to Western Europe. The plan was rejected by the British Chiefs of Staff Committee as militarily unfeasible.

=== Operation Dropshot ===
Operation Dropshot was the 1949 United States contingency plan for a possible nuclear and conventional war with the Soviet Union in the Western European and Asian theaters. Although the scenario made use of nuclear weapons, they were not expected to play a decisive role.

At the time, the US nuclear arsenal was limited in size, based mostly in the United States, and depended on bombers for delivery. Dropshot included mission profiles that would have used 300 nuclear bombs and 29,000 high-explosive bombs on 200 targets in 100 cities and towns to wipe out 85% of the Soviet Union's industrial potential in a single stroke. Between 75 and 100 of the 300 nuclear weapons were targeted to destroy Soviet combat aircraft on the ground.

The scenario was devised before the development of intercontinental ballistic missiles. It was also devised before US president John F. Kennedy and his Secretary of Defense Robert McNamara changed the US Nuclear War plan from the 'city killing' countervalue strike plan to a "counterforce" plan (targeted more at military forces). Nuclear weapons at this time were not accurate enough to hit a naval base without destroying the city adjacent to it, so the aim of using them was to destroy the enemy's industrial capacity to cripple their war economy.

=== British-Irish cooperation ===
Ireland started planning for a possible nuclear war in the late 1940s. Co-operation between the United Kingdom and Ireland would be formed in the event of WWIII, where they would share weather data, control aids to navigation, and coordinate the Wartime Broadcasting Service that would occur after a nuclear attack. Operation Sandstone in Ireland was a top-secret British-Irish military operation. The armed forces from both states began a coastal survey of Britain and Ireland cooperating from 1948 to 1955. This was a request from the United States to identify suitable landing grounds for the US in the event of a successful Soviet invasion. By 1953, the co-operation agreed upon sharing information on wartime weather and the evacuation of civilian refugees from Britain to Ireland. Ireland's Operation Sandstone ended in 1966.

=== Seven Days to the River Rhine ===
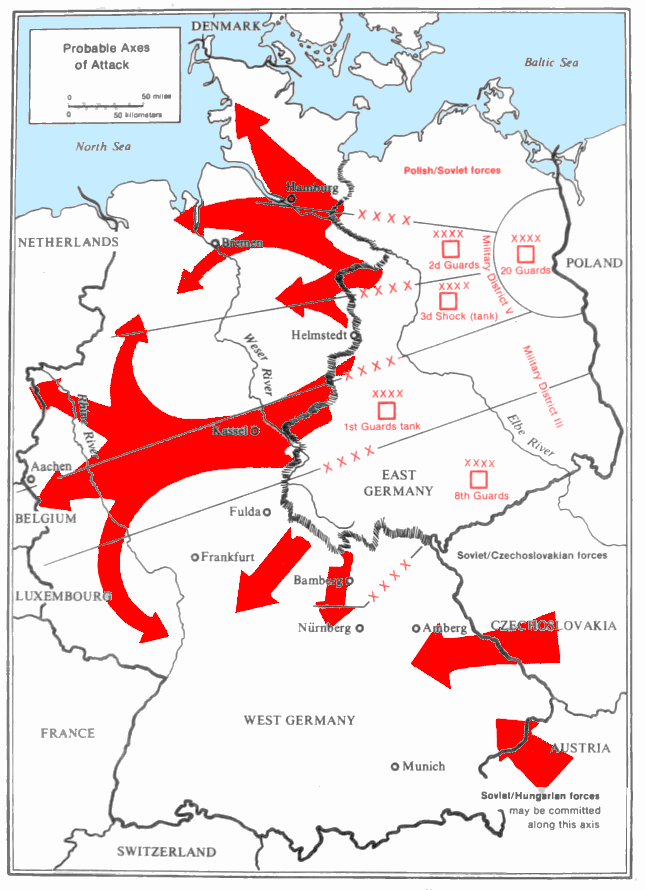
A Warsaw Pact invasion would have come via three main paths through West Germany.

Seven Days to the River Rhine was a top-secret military simulation exercise developed in 1979 by the Warsaw Pact. It started with the assumption that NATO would launch a nuclear attack on the Vistula river valley in a first-strike scenario, which would result in as many as two million Polish civilian casualties. In response, a Soviet counter-strike would be carried out against West Germany, Belgium, the Netherlands and Denmark, with Warsaw Pact forces invading West Germany and aiming to stop at the River Rhine by the seventh day. Other USSR plans stopped only upon reaching the French border on day nine. Individual Warsaw Pact states were only assigned their subpart of the strategic picture; in this case, the Polish forces were only expected to go as far as Germany. The Seven Days to the Rhine plan envisioned that Poland and Germany would be largely destroyed by nuclear exchanges and that large numbers of troops would die of radiation sickness. It was estimated that NATO would fire nuclear weapons behind the advancing Soviet lines to cut off their supply lines and thus blunt their advance. While this plan assumed that NATO would use nuclear weapons to push back any Warsaw Pact invasion, it did not include nuclear strikes on France or the United Kingdom. Newspapers speculated when this plan was declassified, that France and the UK were not to be hit to get them to withhold the use of their nuclear weapons.

=== NATO nuclear sharing ===
An example of nuclear artillery power test in the US

NATO operational plans for a Third World War have involved NATO allies who do not have their nuclear weapons, using nuclear weapons supplied by the United States as part of a general NATO war plan, under the direction of NATO's Supreme Allied Commander.

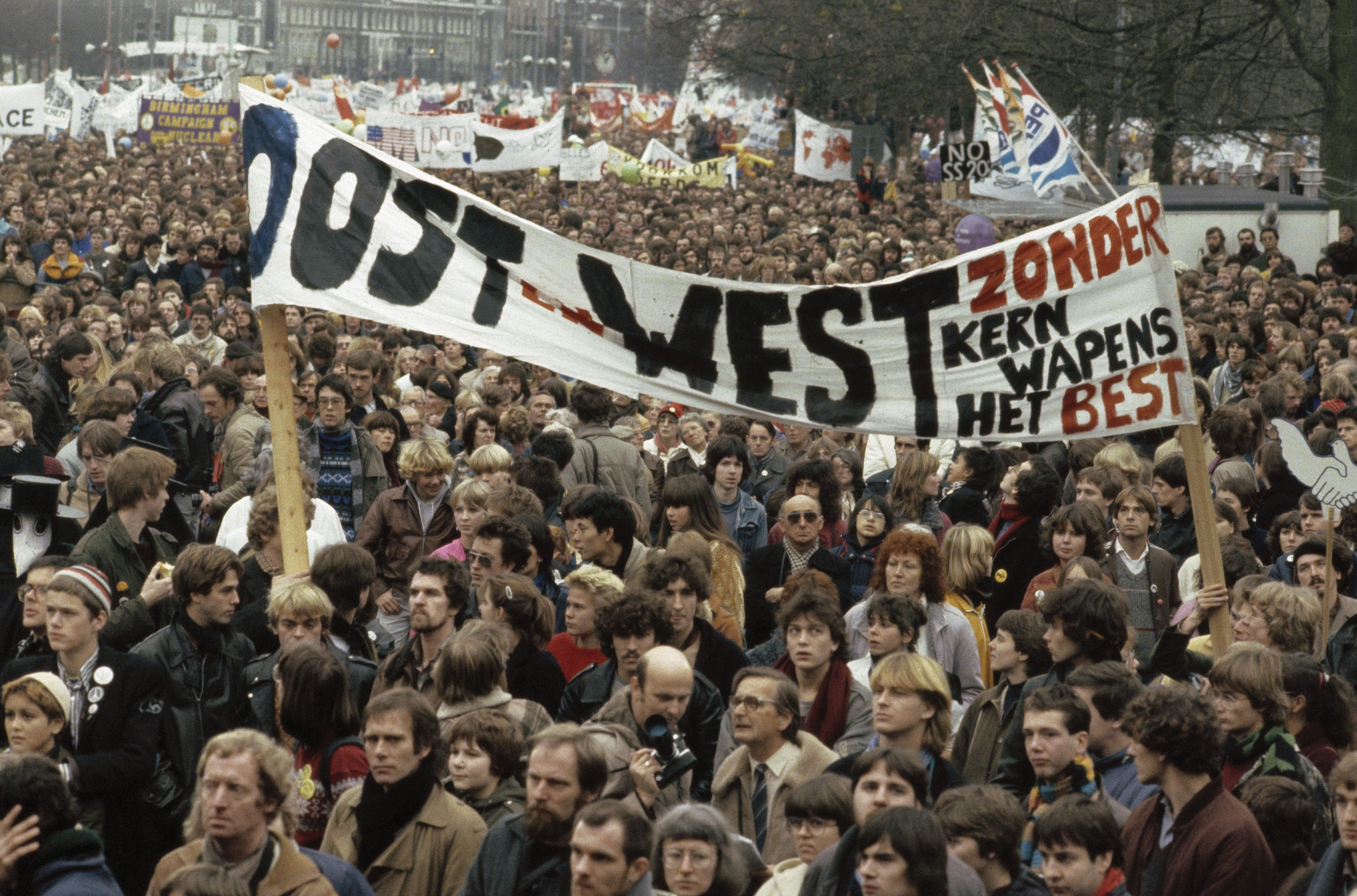
Protest in Amsterdam against the nuclear arms race between the US/NATO and the Soviet Union, 1981

Of the three nuclear powers in NATO (France, the United Kingdom, and the United States), only the United States has provided weapons for nuclear sharing. As of November 2009, Belgium, Germany, Italy, the Netherlands and Turkey are still hosting US nuclear weapons as part of NATO's nuclear sharing policy. Canada hosted weapons until 1984, and Greece until 2001. The United Kingdom also received US tactical nuclear weapons such as nuclear artillery and Lance missiles until 1992, despite the UK being a nuclear weapons state in its own right; these were mainly deployed in Germany.

In peacetime, the nuclear weapons stored in non-nuclear countries are guarded by US airmen though previously some artillery and missile systems were guarded by US Army soldiers; the codes required for detonating them are under American control. In case of war, the weapons are to be mounted on the participating countries' warplanes. The weapons are under custody and control of USAF Munitions Support Squadrons co-located on NATO main operating bases that work together with the host nation forces.

As of 2005, 180 tactical B61 nuclear bombs of the 480 US nuclear weapons believed to be deployed in Europe fall under the nuclear sharing arrangement. The weapons are stored within a vault in hardened aircraft shelters, using the USAF WS3 Weapon Storage and Security System. The delivery warplanes used are F-16 Fighting Falcons and Panavia Tornados.

== Historical conflicts and incidents ==
With the initiation of the Cold War arms race in the 1950s, an apocalyptic war between the United States and the Soviet Union became a real possibility. During the Cold War era (1947–1991), several military events have been described as having come close to potentially triggering World War III. Even after the end of the Cold War and the dissolution of the Soviet Union in 1991, some incidents afterward have been described as close calls as well.

=== Cold War ===
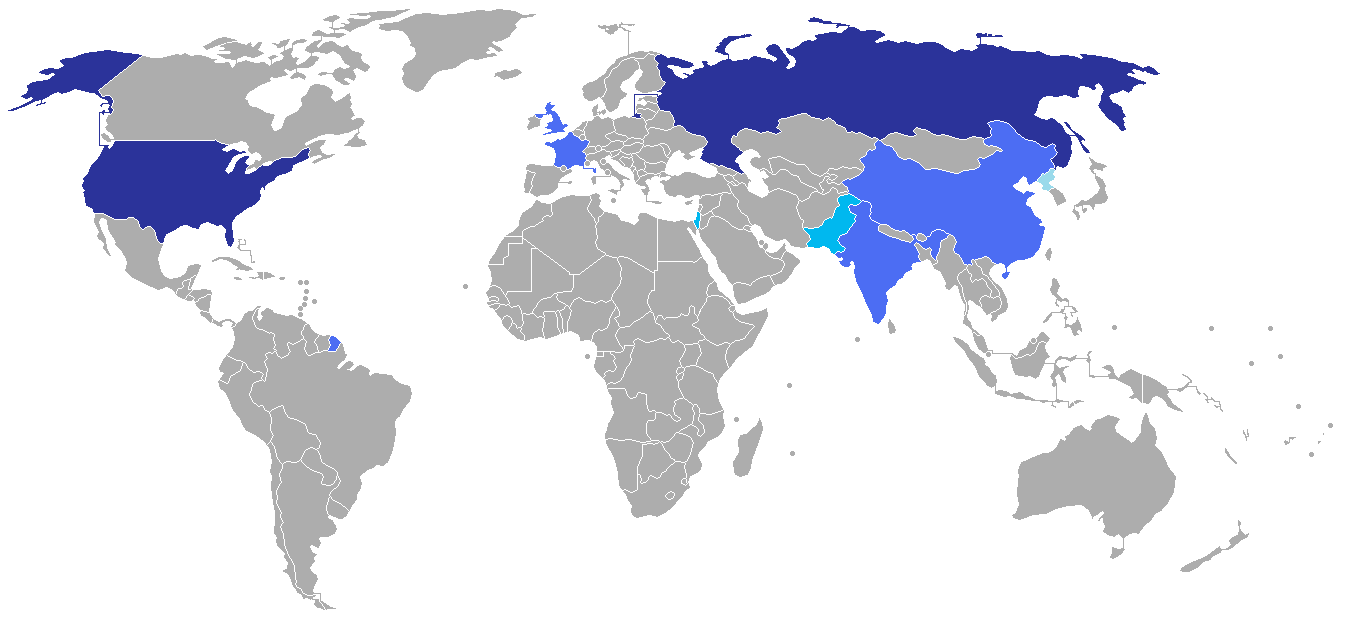
Large nuclear weapons stockpile with global range (dark blue), smaller stockpile with global range (medium blue), smaller stockpile with regional range (light blue)

As Soviet-American relations grew tense in the post–World War II period, the fear that the tension could escalate into World War III was ever-present. A Gallup poll in December 1950 found that more than half of Americans considered World War III to have already started.

In 2004, commentator Norman Podhoretz proposed that the Cold War, lasting from the surrender of the Axis powers until the fall of the Berlin Wall, might rightly be called World War III. However, the majority of historians hold that World War III would have to be a worldwide "war in which large forces from many countries fought" and a war that "involves most of the principal nations of the world". The Cold War was termed as such due to a lack of direct action by the two main belligerents, the United States and the Soviet Union, out of fear that a nuclear war would possibly destroy humanity. In his book Secret Weapons of the Cold War, Bill Yenne concludes that the military superpower standoff from the 1940s through to 1991 was not World War III.

=== Korean War: 25 June 1950 – 27 July 1953 ===
The Korean War was a war between two coalitions fighting for control over the Korean Peninsula: a communist coalition including North Korea, the People's Republic of China, and the Soviet Union, and a capitalist coalition including South Korea, the United States and the United Nations Command. Many then believed that the conflict was likely to soon escalate into a full-scale war between the three countries, the U.S., the U.S.S.R., and China. CBS News war correspondent Bill Downs wrote in 1951, "To my mind, the answer is: Yes, Korea is the beginning of World War III. The brilliant landings at Inchon and the cooperative efforts of the American armed forces with the United Nations Allies have won us a victory in Korea. But this is only the first battle in a major international struggle which now is engulfing the Far East and the entire world." Downs afterwards repeated this belief on ABC Evening News while reporting on the USS Pueblo incident in 1968. Secretary of State Dean Acheson later acknowledged that the Truman administration was concerned about the escalation of the conflict and that General Douglas MacArthur warned him that a U.S.-led intervention risked a Soviet response.

=== Cuban Missile Crisis: 15–29 October 1962 ===
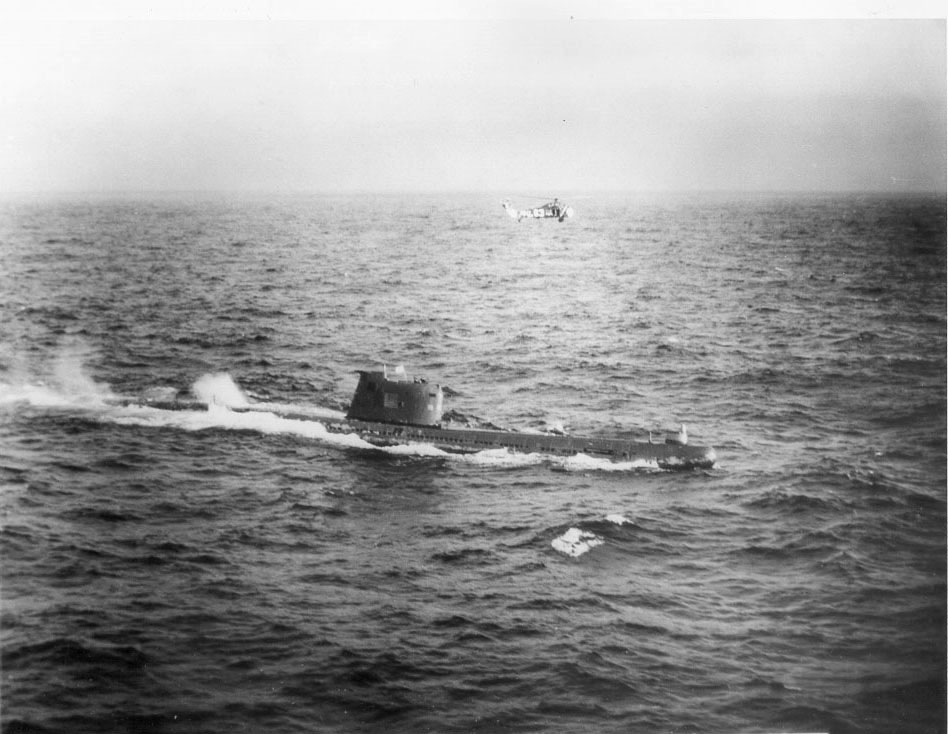
A US Navy HSS-1 Seabat helicopter hovers over Soviet submarine B-59, forced to the surface by US Naval forces in the Caribbean near Cuba. B-59 had a nuclear torpedo on board, and three officer keys were required to use it. Only one dissent prevented the submarine from attacking the US fleet nearby, a spark that could have led to a Third World War (28–29 October 1962).

The Cuban Missile Crisis, a confrontation on the stationing of Soviet nuclear missiles in Cuba in response to the failed Bay of Pigs Invasion, is considered as having been the closest to a nuclear exchange, which could have precipitated a third World War. The crisis peaked on 27 October, with three separate major incidents occurring on the same day:

- The most critical incident occurred when a Soviet submarine nearly launched a nuclear-tipped torpedo in response to having been targeted by American naval depth charges in international waters, with the Soviet nuclear launch response only having been prevented by Soviet Navy executive officer Vasily Arkhipov.
- The shooting down of a Lockheed U-2 spy plane piloted by Rudolf Anderson while violating Cuban airspace.
- The near interception of another U-2 that had strayed into Soviet airspace over Siberia, which airspace violation nearly caused the Soviets to believe that this might be the vanguard of a US aerial bombardment.

Despite what many believe to be the closest the world has come to a nuclear conflict, throughout the entire standoff, the Doomsday Clock, which is run by the Bulletin of the Atomic Scientists to estimate how close the end of the world, or doomsday, is, with midnight being the apocalypse, stayed at a relatively stable seven minutes to midnight. This has been explained as being due to the brevity of the crisis since the clock monitored more long-term factors such as the leadership of countries, conflicts, wars, and political upheavals, as well as societies' reactions to said factors.

The Bulletin of the Atomic Scientists now credits the political developments resulting from the Cuban Missile Crisis with having enhanced global stability. The Bulletin posits that future crises and occasions that might otherwise escalate, were rendered more stable due to two major factors:

1. A Washington to Moscow hotline resulted from the communication trouble between the White House and the Kremlin during the crisis. This gave the leaders of the two largest nuclear powers the ability to contact each other in real-time, vital when seconds could potentially prevent a nuclear exchange.
2. The second factor was caused in part due to the worldwide reaction to how close the US and USSR had come to the brink of World War III during the standoff. As the public began to more closely monitor topics involving nuclear weapons, and therefore to rally support for the cause of non-proliferation, the 1963 test ban treaty was signed. To date this treaty has been signed by 126 total nations, with the most notable exceptions being France and China. Both of these countries were still in the relative beginning stages of their nuclear programs at the time of the original treaty signing, and both sought nuclear capabilities independent of their allies. This Test Ban Treaty prevented the testing of nuclear ordnance that detonated in the atmosphere, limiting nuclear weapons testing to below ground and underwater, decreasing fallout and effects on the environment, and subsequently caused the Doomsday Clock to decrease by five minutes, to arrive at a total of twelve minutes to midnight. Up until this point, over 1000 nuclear bombs had been detonated, and concerns over both long and short term effects to the planet became increasingly more worrisome to scientists.

=== Yom Kippur War superpower tensions: 6–25 October 1973 ===
The Yom Kippur War, also known as the Ramadan War, or October War, began with a surprise invasion of Israeli-occupied territories by a coalition of Arab states, aided by the Soviet Union. Israel successfully counterattacked with the aid of the US. Tensions grew between the two superpowers: American and Soviet naval forces came close to firing upon each other in the Mediterranean Sea. Admiral Daniel J. Murphy of the US Sixth Fleet reckoned the chances of the Soviet squadron attempting a first strike against his fleet at 40 percent. The Pentagon moved Defcon status from 4 to 3. The superpowers had been pushed to the brink of war, but tensions eased with the ceasefire brought in under UNSC 339.

=== NORAD computer error: 9 November 1979 ===
The United States made emergency retaliation preparations after NORAD systems indicated that a full-scale Soviet attack had been launched. No attempt was made to use the Moscow–Washington hotline to clarify the situation with the USSR and it was not until early-warning radar systems confirmed no such launch had taken place that NORAD realized that a computer system test had caused the display errors. A senator inside the NORAD facility at the time described an atmosphere of absolute panic. A GAO investigation led to the construction of an off-site test facility to prevent similar mistakes.

=== Soviet radar malfunction: 26 September 1983 ===
A false alarm occurred on the Soviet nuclear early warning system, showing the launch of American LGM-30 Minuteman intercontinental ballistic missiles from bases in the United States. A retaliatory attack was prevented by Stanislav Petrov, a Soviet Air Defence Forces officer, who realised the system had simply malfunctioned (which was borne out by later investigations).

=== Able Archer 83 escalations: 2–11 November 1983 ===
Exercise Able Archer was an annual exercise by the U.S. European Command that practiced command and control procedures, with emphasis on the transition from solely conventional operations to chemical, nuclear, and conventional operations during a time of war.

During Able Archer 83, a NATO command post exercise simulating a period of conflict escalation that culminated in a DEFCON 1 nuclear strike, some members of the Soviet Politburo and armed forces treated the events as a ruse of war concealing a genuine first strike. In response, the military prepared for a coordinated counter-attack by readying nuclear forces and placing air units stationed in the Warsaw Pact states of East Germany and Poland under high alert. However, the state of Soviet preparation for retaliation ceased upon completion of the Able Archer exercises.

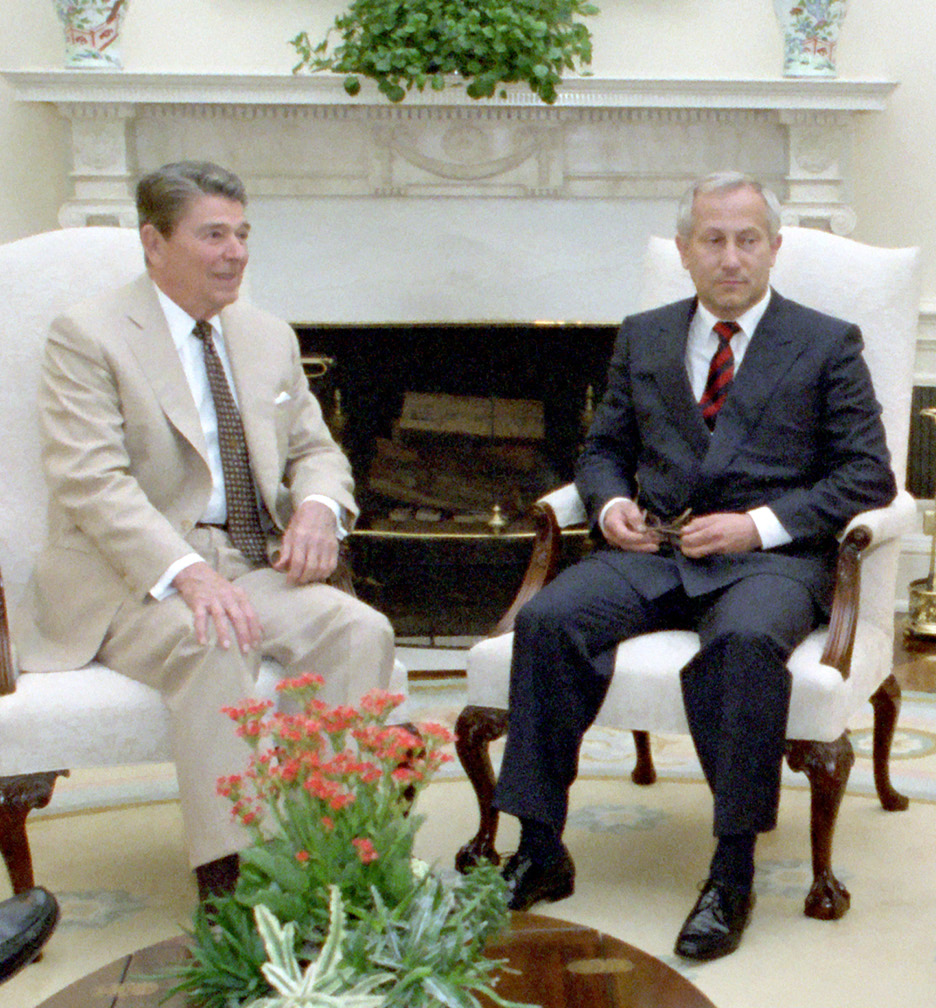
U.S. president Ronald Reagan and Soviet double agent Oleg Gordievsky, who later told the West how close the Able Archer 83 exercise had brought the Soviets to ordering a First Strike.

Able Archer 83 began on 7 November 1983 and spanned Western Europe, centered on the Supreme Headquarters Allied Powers Europe (SHAPE) Headquarters in Casteau, north of the city of Mons. Able Archer's exercises simulated a period of conflict escalation, culminating in a coordinated nuclear attack.

The realistic nature of the 1983 exercise, coupled with deteriorating relations between the United States and the Soviet Union and the anticipated arrival of strategic Pershing II nuclear missiles in Europe, led some members of the Soviet Politburo and military to believe that Able Archer 83 was a ruse of war, obscuring preparations for a genuine nuclear first strike. In response, the Soviets readied their nuclear forces and placed air units in East Germany and Poland on alert.

This "1983 war scare" is considered by many historians to be the closest the world has come to nuclear war since the Cuban Missile Crisis of 1962. The threat of nuclear war ended with the conclusion of the exercise on 11 November.

=== Norwegian rocket incident: 25 January 1995 ===
The Norwegian rocket incident was the first World War III close call to occur after the Cold War had ended. This incident occurred when Russia's Olenegorsk early warning station accidentally mistook the radar signature from a Black Brant XII research rocket (being jointly launched by Norwegian and US scientists from Andøya Rocket Range), as appearing to be the radar signature of the launch of a Trident SLBM missile. In response, Russian president Boris Yeltsin was summoned and the Cheget nuclear briefcase was activated for the first and only time. However, the high command was soon able to determine that the rocket was not entering Russian airspace, and promptly aborted plans for combat readiness and retaliation. It was retrospectively determined that, while the rocket scientists had informed thirty states including Russia about the test launch, the information had not reached Russian radar technicians.

=== Incident at Pristina airport: 12 June 1999 ===
On 12 June 1999, the day following the end of the Kosovo War, some 250 Russian peacekeepers occupied the Pristina International Airport ahead of the arrival of NATO troops and were to secure the arrival of reinforcements by air. American NATO Supreme Allied Commander Europe General Wesley Clark ordered the use of force against the Russians. Mike Jackson, a British Army general who contacted the Russians during the incident, refused to enforce Clark's orders, famously telling him "I'm not going to start the Third World War for you". Captain James Blunt, the lead officer at the front of the NATO column in the direct armed stand-off against the Russians, received the "Destroy!" orders from Clark over the radio, but he followed Jackson's orders to encircle the airfield instead and later said in an interview that even without Jackson's intervention he would have refused to follow Clark's order.

=== War on terror ===
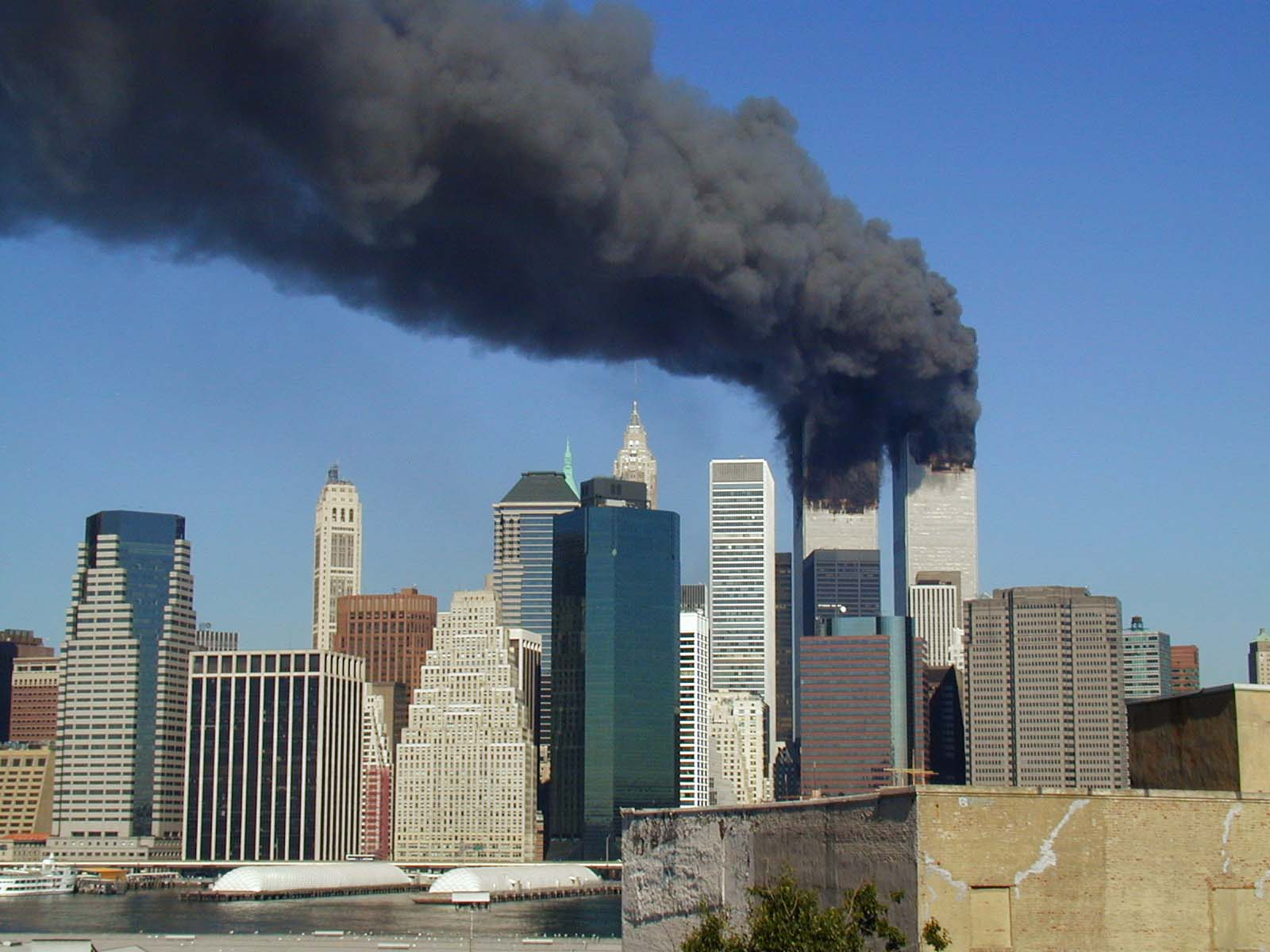
September 11 attacks

The "war on terror" that began with the September 11 attacks has been claimed by some to be World War III or sometimes World War IV (assuming the Cold War was World War III). Others have disparaged such claims as "distorting American history". While there is general agreement amongst historians regarding the definitions and extent of the first two world wars, namely due to the unmistakable global scale of aggression and self-destruction of these two wars, a few have claimed that a "World War" might now no longer require such worldwide and large-scale aggression and carnage. Still, such claims of a new "lower threshold of aggression", that might now be sufficient to qualify a war as a "World War" have not gained such widespread acceptance and support as the definitions of the first two world wars have received amongst historians. In 2004, commentator Norman Podhoretz argued that, if the Cold War was considered World War III, "World War IV" would be the global campaign against Islamofascism.

=== War on the Islamic State ===
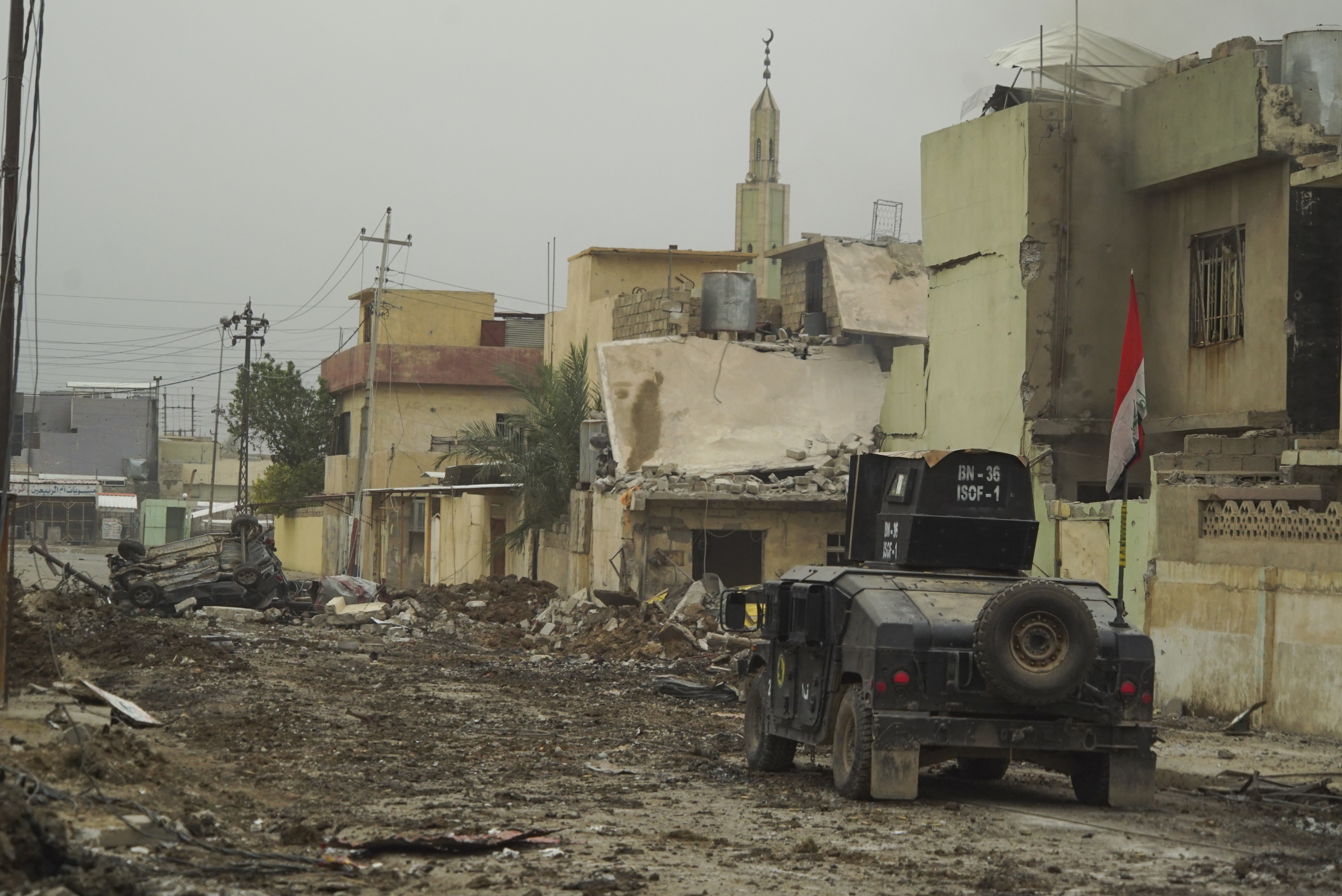
An Iraqi Special Operations Forces (ISOF) Humvee on the street of Mosul, Northern Iraq, 16 November 2016 during the Battle of Mosul

On 1 February 2015, Iraqi Foreign Minister Ibrahim al-Jaafari declared that the war against the Islamic State was effectively "World War III", due to the Islamic State's aims for a worldwide caliphate, and its success in spreading the conflict to multiple countries outside of the Levant region. In response to the November 2015 Paris attacks, King of Jordan Abdullah II stated "We are facing a Third World War against humanity".

In his State of the Union Address on 12 January 2016, US president Barack Obama warned that news reports granting ISIL the supposed ability to foment a third World War might be excessive and irresponsible, stating that "as we focus on destroying ISIL, over-the-top claims that this is World War III just play into their hands. Masses of fighters on the back of pickup trucks and twisted souls plotting in apartments or garages pose an enormous danger to civilians and must be stopped. But they do not threaten our national existence."

Some have argued that a hypothetical World War III could be an event similar to a prophesied "Great War" in scripture, namely the Armageddon in Christianity and Malhama al Kubra in Islam.

=== Shootdown of Sukhoi bomber: 24 November 2015 ===
On 24 November 2015, at the border between Turkey and Syria, the Turkish Air Force shot down a Russian Sukhoi attack aircraft. The Turks claimed that the aircraft violated Turkish airspace, a claim denied by the Russians; the plane was in the region as part of the Russian military intervention in the Syrian civil war, in which Turkey supported opposing forces. The incident was the first destruction of a Russian or Soviet Air Forces warplane by a NATO member state since the attack on the Sui-ho Dam during the Korean War in 1953. The incident led to numerous media and individuals commenting that it could have sparked and escalated into a world war.

== Current potential flashpoints ==
=== China–Taiwan tensions ===
After the end of the Chinese Civil War, the communist People's Republic of China (PRC) claimed the mainland, while the Republic of China (ROC) government retreated to Taiwan. Both sides claim to be the only lawful government of China and claim ownership of the others' territory.

Multiple crises in the strait of Taiwan have occurred since the PRC’s proclamation in 1949. Diplomacy was normalized in the 1990s, but the PRC's persistent opposition to Taiwan's de facto autonomy has stoked fears of a PRC invasion of Taiwan, to achieve its vision of Chinese unification. In the 2020s, the PRC has increasingly threatened a military intervention, and has built up forces and held provocative military exercises around Taiwan. In response, Taiwan has sought to enhance its defenses and has sought international help, most notably from the United States, to resist an invasion. US officials have warned that the PRC could be ready for military action against Taiwan by 2027. Beijing's large-scale exercises, including a simulated siege of the island, are seen as indicators of this readiness. Sometime in the spring of 2026, a false intelligence report generated by an AI chatbot almost led the U.S. military to intercept a Chinese vessel in the Middle East, and the operation was aborted just before execution when the nature of the report was revealed. News analysts suggested that a U.S. operation against a Chinese vessel could have risked spiraling into an armed conflict between the two nations.

=== Russo-Ukrainian War (2022–present) ===
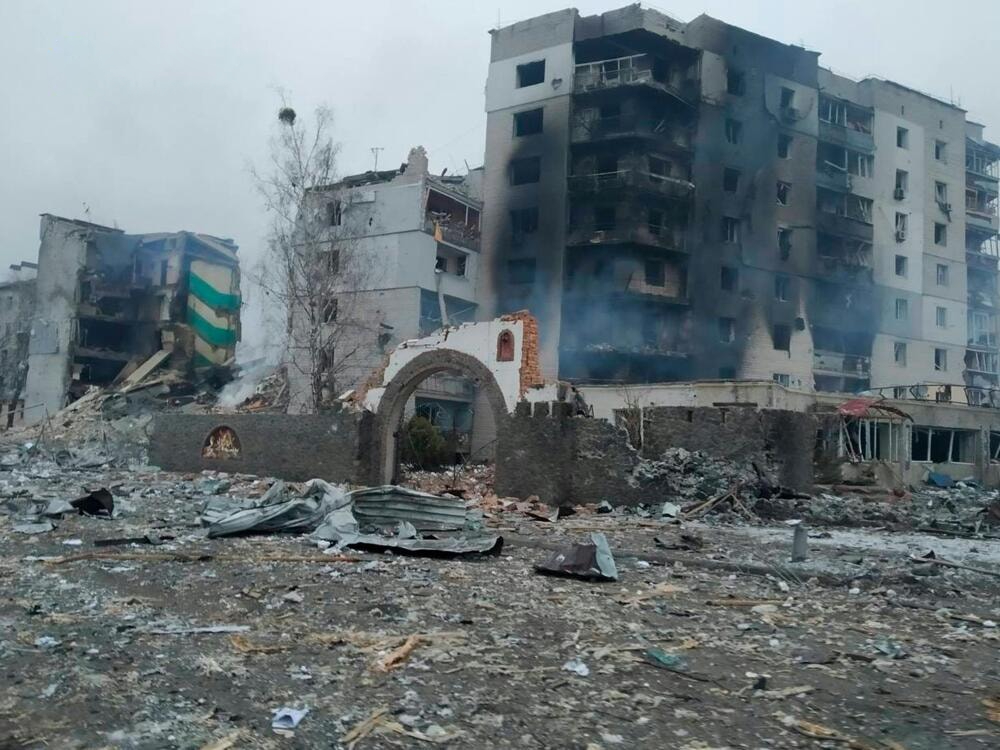
Buildings destroyed by the Russian bombing of Borodianka, March 2022

On 24 February 2022, Russia's president Vladimir Putin ordered a full-scale invasion of Ukraine, marking a major escalation of the Russo-Ukrainian war, which began in 2014. The Russian invasion started the largest war in Europe since World War II. Various experts, analysts, and others have described the invasion as heightening the risk of a third world war, while others disagree. The NATO military alliance has supported Ukraine's defense. Several incidents have risked a direct conflict between Russia and NATO, such as Russian breaches of NATO airspace and a missile explosion in Poland.

Because of the invasion, at least fifty countries have provided military aid to Ukraine, including all member states of NATO. The Russian government has threatened retaliation against these countries, and said it meant NATO was waging a "proxy war" against Russia. Senior Russian officials—including president Putin, foreign minister Sergey Lavrov, and Dmitry Medvedev—have made statements widely seen as nuclear blackmail. They have implied that Russia may use nuclear weapons if certain "red lines" are crossed, such as countries helping Ukraine to strike back at mainland Russia. Then-US President Joe Biden and then-NATO Secretary General Jens Stoltenberg stressed the need to prevent the conflict escalating into a third world war, while also affirming that NATO members will defend each other. The US warned Russia's government that the country would suffer "catastrophic" consequences if it used nuclear weapons against Ukraine.

Russian threats have been described as a way to intimidate Western countries, to deter them from helping Ukraine. Fearing escalation, NATO countries held back from sending advanced weapons to Ukraine, and forbade Ukraine to fire NATO weapons into Russia. Since July 2024, they have allowed Ukraine to use NATO weapons to strike military targets in Russia, but only near the border in self-defense. Russia's government has not followed through on its threats against NATO and has not used nuclear weapons, despite most of its "red lines" being crossed.

Iran and North Korea have provided weapons and ammunition to Russia during the invasion, including ballistic missiles. In 2024, Russia and North Korea signed a defense pact, and Russia further escalated the conflict by deploying 10,000 North Korean troops on its border to fight a Ukrainian incursion. In November 2024, Putin said that the war "has acquired elements of a global character", adding that Russia was entitled to strike military facilities of those countries that allow their weapons to be used against it.

In February 2025, during a controversial meeting between U.S. president Donald Trump and Ukrainian president Volodymyr Zelenskyy, an argument erupted, and Trump accused Zelenskyy of "gambling with World War III". French president Emmanuel Macron responded "If anyone is gambling with World War III, his name is Vladimir Putin".

On 9 September 2025, about twenty Russian military drones entered Polish airspace. Some of them were shot down by NATO fighter jets and others crashed. Polish Prime Minister Donald Tusk stated that a large military conflict was closer than at any time since World War II. Ahead of the invasion's fourth anniversary, on 23 February 2026, Zelenskyy said he believed Putin had "already started" World War III.

=== 2026 Iran war ===
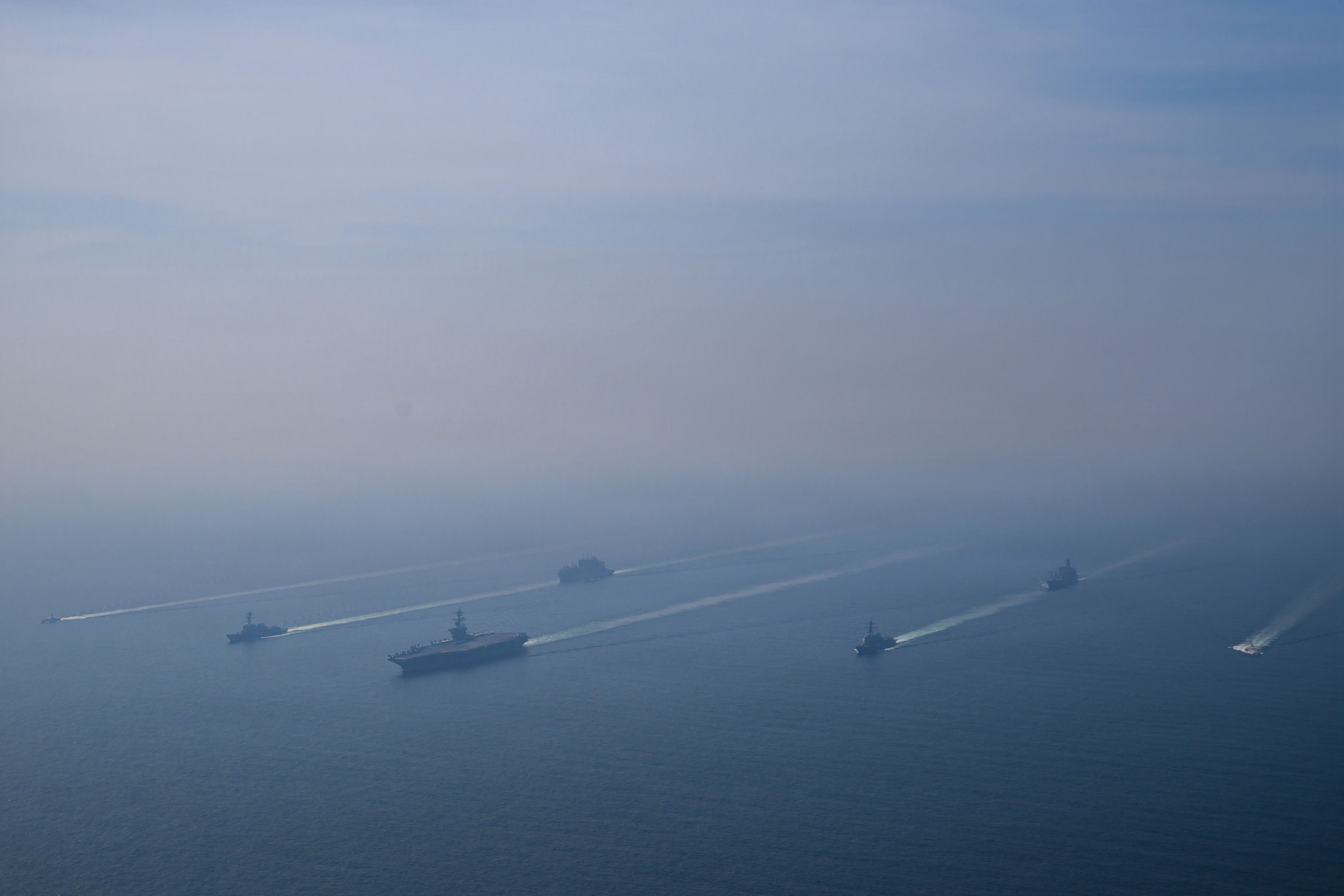
Carrier Strike Group 3 sails in formation in the Arabian Sea during the 2026 United States military build-up in the Middle East, 6 February 2026

On 28 February 2026, the U.S. and Israel jointly carried out strikes on Iran with the stated goal of regime change. Numerous Iranian officials were killed, including Supreme Leader Ali Khamenei, leading Iran to launch retaliatory strikes against both Israel, US military bases and US allies in the region. This sparked a major regional conflict and raised fears of a third world war.

After an Iranian missile was shot down heading towards NATO-member Turkey, with the debris landing in Dörtyol, concerns were raised that the alliance would be drawn into the war. Military analysts told The Wall Street Journal that Iran's strategy was aimed at "internationaliz[ing] the conflict, imposing a higher cost on U.S. allies and disrupting global markets".

In an opinion piece for NJ.com, political strategists Julie Roginsky and Michael DuHaime stated that the Iran war was the beginning of World War III. The conflict was also described in March 2026 as "the precipice of World War III" by former US Secretary of Labor Robert Reich, and "the final catalyst for a third world war" by former British Army officer Richard Shirreff. On 29 March, Mohammad Bagher Ghalibaf, speaker of the Parliament of Iran, referred to the conflict as "a major world war".

=== Multiple wars as a third world war ===
In multiple recorded interviews, comparing the conflagrations of World War I and II to the ongoing wars of the 21st century, Pope Francis said, "The world is at war because it has lost the peace", and "perhaps one can speak of a third war, one fought piecemeal". His successor, Pope Leo XIV, reiterated the description during a visit to Turkey in 2025. Additionally, Fiona Hill has argued that the combination of multiple major conflicts, including in Ukraine and in the Middle East, constitutes a third world war. Polling by Politico found that a majority of American, Canadian, French and British respondents considered it more likely than not that World War III was likely to break out within the next five years. Politico cited Russia's invasion of Ukraine and US military action in Iran, Syria, Venezuela and Africa as potential contributing factors.

In July 2026, Ukrainian drone strikes on Iranian cargo ships in the Caspian Sea sparked speculation about the present wars in those two countries coalescing into a single war.

== Hypothetical scenarios ==
In 1949, after the unleashing of nuclear weaponry at the end of World War II, physicist Albert Einstein suggested that any outcome of a possible World War III would be so catastrophic upon human civilization so as to revert mankind to the Stone Age. When asked by journalist Alfred Werner what types of weapons Einstein believed World War III might be fought with, Einstein warned, "I know not with what weapons World War III will be fought, but World War IV will be fought with sticks and stones."

As for the extermination of the human race as a consequence of atomic war, Leslie A. White challenged Einstein, "this too may be admitted as possibility, and all we can say is that if it is to come, it will come. Extravagant expressions of horror will not alter the course of events." Crane Brinton also doubted the psychological pacification of Einstein: "Teachers, preachers, educators, even politicians are telling the growing generation that there must be no war and, therefore, there will be no war. I have doubts as to whether this is wise teaching..." In spite of the atomic bomb, there will be another general war and humanity will survive it, according to Brinton. James Burnham of the Office of Strategic Services (the precursor to the CIA), also believed in survival: The uniqueness of the atomic weapons is commonly found in that they can totally annihilate human life, including through climatic and geological chain reaction, but such is not the case. The great principles of military strategy stand unaltered. An atomic war will look different from older wars but it will be decided by the same combination of resources, morale and strategy.

A 1998 New England Journal of Medicine overview found that "Although many people believe that the threat of a nuclear attack largely disappeared with the end of the Cold War, there is considerable evidence to the contrary". In particular, the United States–Russia mutual detargeting agreement in 1994 was largely symbolic and did not change the amount of time required to launch an attack. The most likely "accidental-attack" scenario was believed to be a retaliatory launch due to a false warning, similar to the 1983 incident. Historically, World War I happened through an escalating crisis; World War II happened through deliberate action. Hypothesized flashpoints in the 2010s and the 2020s include the Russian invasion of Ukraine, Estonia-Russia tensions (see Narva scenario), Chinese expansion into adjacent islands and seas, Sino-Indian border dispute, Chinese threats of military operation against Taiwan, India-Pakistan conflict, and foreign involvement in the Syrian civil war. Other hypothesized risks are that a war involving or between Saudi Arabia and Iran, Israel and Iran, United States and Iran, Poland and Belarus, South Korea and North Korea, or Taiwan and China could escalate via alliances or intervention into a war between "great powers" such as the United States, United Kingdom, France, Germany, Russia, China, India, Japan or an all out war between military alliances NATO and CSTO, or even the possibility of a "rogue commander" under any nuclear power might launch an unauthorized strike that escalates into a full-blown war.

According to a peer-reviewed study published in the journal Nature Food in August 2022, a full-scale nuclear war between the United States and Russia, releasing over 150 Tg of stratospheric soot, could indirectly kill more than five billion people by starvation during a nuclear winter. More than two billion people could die of starvation from a smaller-scale (5–47 Tg) nuclear war between India and Pakistan. In the event of a nuclear war between Russia and the United States, 99% of the population in the belligerent countries, as well as Europe and China, would die.

Some scenarios involve risks due to upcoming changes from the known status quo. In the 1980s the Strategic Defense Initiative made an effort at nullifying the USSR's nuclear arsenal; some analysts believe the initiative was "destabilizing". In his book Destined for War, Graham Allison views the global rivalry between the established power, the US, and the rising power, China, as an example of the Thucydides Trap. Allison states that historically, "12 of 16 past cases where a rising power has confronted a ruling power" have led to fighting. In 2020 and 2023, the Bulletin of the Atomic Scientists advanced its Doomsday Clock, citing among other factors a predicted destabilizing effect from upcoming hypersonic weapons.

Emerging technologies, such as artificial intelligence, could hypothetically generate risk in the decades ahead. A 2018 RAND Corporation report has argued that AI and associated information technology "will have a large effect on nuclear-security issues in the next quarter century". A hypothetical future AI could provide a destabilizing ability to track "second-launch" launchers. Incorporating AI into decision support systems used to decide whether to launch, could also generate new risks, including the risk of an adversarial exploitation of such an AI's algorithms by a third party to trigger a launch recommendation. A perception that some sort of emerging technology would lead to "world domination" might also be destabilizing, for example by leading to fear of a pre-emptive strike.

Cyberwarfare is the exploitation of technology by a nation-state or international organization to attack and destroy the opposing nation's information networks and computers. The damage can be caused by computer viruses or denial-of-service attacks (DoS). Cyberattacks are becoming increasingly common, threatening cybersecurity and making it a global priority. There has been a proliferation of state-sponsored attacks. The trends of these attacks suggest the potential of a cyber World War III. The world's leading militaries are developing cyber strategies, including ways to alter the enemy's command and control systems, early warning systems, logistics, and transportation. The 2022 Russian invasion of Ukraine has sparked concerns about a large-scale cyberattack, with Russia having previously launched cyberattacks to compromise organizations across Ukraine. Nearly 40 discrete attacks were launched by Russia which permanently destroyed files in hundreds of systems across dozens of organizations, with 40% aimed at critical infrastructure sectors in Ukraine. Russia's use of cyberwarfare has turned the war into a large-scale "hybrid" war in Ukraine.

According to CIA original founder, Miles Copeland, a War hypothetical scenario described in his memoir The Game Player envisioned a wider conflict emerging through crises in the developing world rather than through an immediate direct superpower confrontation, involving the United States and Soviet-aligned forces acting largely through regional actors in the Third World.

== In fiction ==
The concept of World War III is a common theme in science fiction and popular culture.

== See also ==
- Anti-nuclear movement
- Artificial intelligence arms race
- Artificial Intelligence Cold War
- Global catastrophe scenarios
- Nuclear arms race
- Nuclear holocaust
- Nuclear terrorism
- Perpetual war
- Second Cold War
