= Nuclear button =

Figurative term for access to nuclear weapons

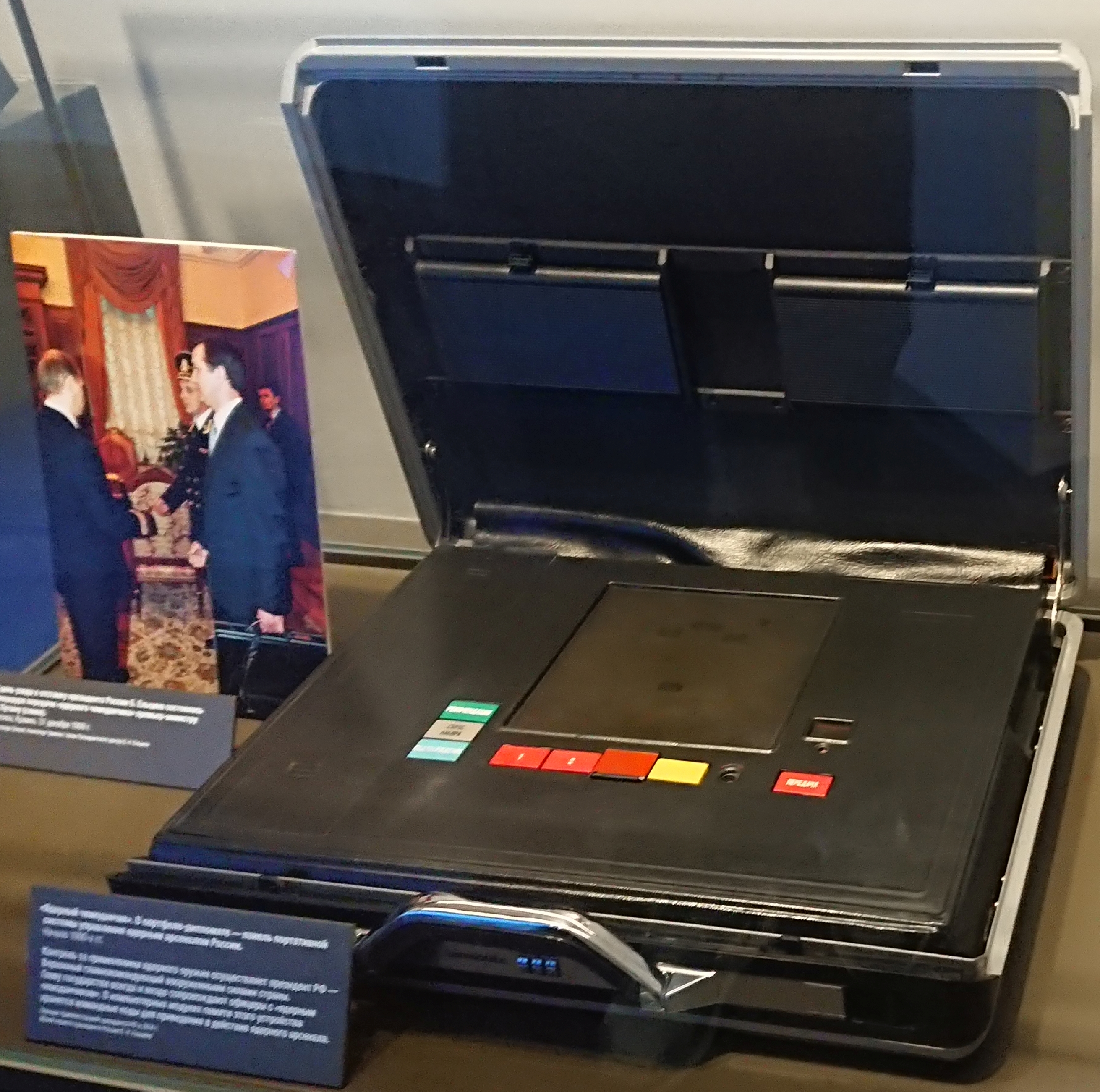
The briefcase cheget, which controls Russian nuclear weapons.

The "nuclear button" is a figurative term referring to the power to use nuclear weapons. "Pushing the nuclear button" refers to actually using them. The actual procedure for using such weapons is more complex than simply pushing a button. The "nuclear button" may be transferred to another official due to political changes or the incapacitation of a person currently in control of it.

Various nuclear countries have nuclear briefcases that accompany the leader (such as the president of the United States), allowing them to launch nuclear missiles at any time.

Depictions of nuclear buttons sometimes appear in popular culture – for example, the music video for It's a Mistake in which an officer accidentally presses the nuclear button; and Land of Confusion, in which president Reagan launches a nuclear attack using the button.

== North Korean announcement ==
On January 1, 2018, Kim Jong Un announced during his New Year speech "the nuclear button is always on the desk of my office" in order to make the United States aware that he is able to attack the country at will. US President Trump responded via Twitter on the following day:

Donald J. Trump
(@realDonaldTrump)
tweeted:

Will someone from his depleted and food starved regime please inform him that I too have a Nuclear Button, but it is a much bigger & more powerful one than his, and my Button works!

January 2, 2018

== Diet Coke button ==
Trump has been reported to have used a red "Diet Coke button" as a signal for a butler to serve a glass of Diet Coke in the Oval Office. In his 2019 book Team of Vipers, Cliff Sims writes that Trump jokingly referred to it as a nuclear button in front of visitors: “Not sure what to do, guests would look at one another with raised eyebrows. Moments later, a steward would enter the room carrying a glass filled with Diet Coke on a silver platter, and Trump would burst out laughing.”

== See also ==
- Nuclear briefcase, the non-figurative authorization mechanism for the nuclear weapons of various countries
