= Norwegian rocket incident =

1995 misidentification of sounding rocket

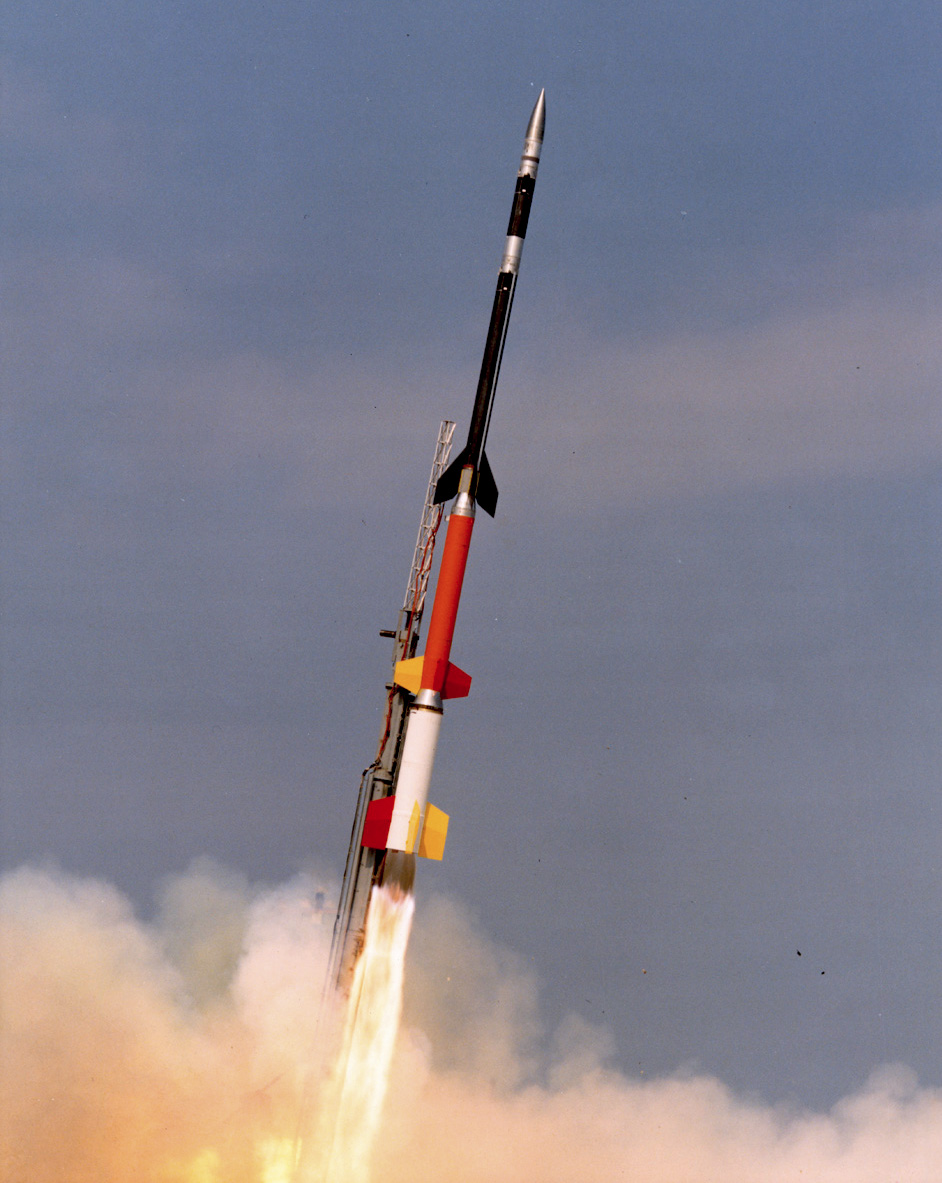
- A Black Brant XII rocket similar to the one that was involved in the incident.

- Norwegian rocket incident (Norway) Location of Andøya Rocket Range, the launch site of the missile.
- Date: 25 January 1995 (31 years ago)
- Duration: 0:24:00
- Cause: Launch of a Black Brant XII rocket from the Andøya Rocket Range in Norway.
- Participants: Russia; Boris Yeltsin; Andrei Kozyrev; Mikhail Kolesnikov; Norway; United States
- Outcome: Russian nuclear forces put on high alert for approximately eight minutes before standing down.

On January 25, 1995, a team of Norwegian and American scientists launched a Black Brant XII four-stage sounding rocket from the Andøya Rocket Range off the northwestern coast of Norway. The rocket carried scientific equipment to study the aurora borealis over Svalbard, and flew on a high northbound trajectory, which included an air corridor that stretches from Minuteman III nuclear missile silos in North Dakota all the way to Moscow, the capital city of Russia. The rocket eventually reached an altitude of 1,453 kilometers (903 mi), resembling a US Navy submarine-launched Trident missile. Fearing a high-altitude nuclear attack that could blind Russian radar, Russian nuclear forces went on high alert, and the "nuclear briefcase" (the Cheget) was taken to Russian president Boris Yeltsin, who then had to decide whether to launch a retaliatory nuclear strike against the United States. Russian observers determined that there was no nuclear attack and no retaliation was ordered.

The Norwegian rocket incident was a few minutes of post-Cold War nuclear tension that took place nearly four years after the end of the Cold War. While not as well known an incident as the Cuban Missile Crisis of October 1962 (nor the 1983 Soviet nuclear false alarm incident, which was still classified at the time), the 1995 incident is considered to be one of the most severe incidents. The 1995 incident happened quickly, and occurred at a time where many Russians, especially in the military, were still very suspicious of the United States and NATO. In contrast, the Cuban Missile Crisis of October 1962 had a much longer build-up.

== Detection ==
As the Black Brant XII rocket gained altitude, it was detected by the Olenegorsk early-warning radar station in Murmansk Oblast. To the radar operators, the rocket appeared similar in speed and flight pattern to a US Navy submarine-launched Trident missile, leading the Russian military to initially misinterpret the rocket's trajectory as representing the precursor to a possible attack by missiles from submarines.

=== EMP missile scenario ===
One possibility was that the rocket had been a solitary missile with a radar-blocking electromagnetic pulse (EMP) payload launched from a Trident missile at sea in order to blind Russian radars in the first stage of a surprise attack. In this scenario, gamma rays from a high-altitude nuclear detonation would create a very high-intensity electromagnetic pulse that would confuse radars and incapacitate electronic equipment and telecommunications. After that, according to the scenario, the main attack would start.

=== Post-staging ===
After stage separation, the rocket launch appeared on radar similar to Multiple Reentry vehicles (MRVs); the Russian control center did not immediately realize that the Norwegian scientific rocket was headed out to sea, rather than toward Russia. Tracking the trajectory took 8 of the 10 minutes allotted to the process of deciding whether to launch a nuclear response to an impending attack; a submarine-launched Trident missile from the Barents Sea would be able to reach mainland Russia in 10 minutes.

== Response ==
This event resulted in a full alert being passed up through the military chain of command all the way to President Boris Yeltsin, who was notified and the "nuclear briefcase" used to authorize nuclear launch was automatically activated. Yeltsin activated his "nuclear keys" for the first time. No warning was issued to the Russian populace of any incident; it was reported in the news a week afterward.

As a result of the alert, Russian submarine commanders were ordered to go into a state of combat readiness and prepare for nuclear retaliation.

Soon thereafter, Russian observers were able to determine that the rocket was heading away from Russian airspace and was not a threat. The rocket fell to earth as planned, near Spitsbergen, 24 minutes after launch.

The Norwegian rocket incident was the first and thus far only known incident where any nuclear-weapons state had its nuclear briefcase activated and prepared for launching an attack.

== Prior notification ==
The Norwegian and American scientists had notified thirty countries, including Russia, of their intention to launch a high-altitude scientific experiment aboard a rocket; however, the information was not passed on to the radar technicians. The launch was notified in good time to the Russian Ministry of Foreign Affairs. However, due to an error on the part of the Russian Foreign Ministry, the notification was never given to the Russian General Staff, or any part of the Russian military. An anonymous Russian general later told the press that the wording of Norway's missile launch message to "notify the upcoming launch of a meteorological rocket to sea-farers" was taken too literally by Russian bureaucrats. "Foreign Ministry officials took a literal attitude toward that request: sailors knew of the event. Not the military." Following the incident, notification and disclosure protocols were re-evaluated and redesigned.

== See also ==
- List of nuclear close calls
- Able Archer 83
- Dr. Strangelove
