= Cheget =

Russian nuclear briefcase

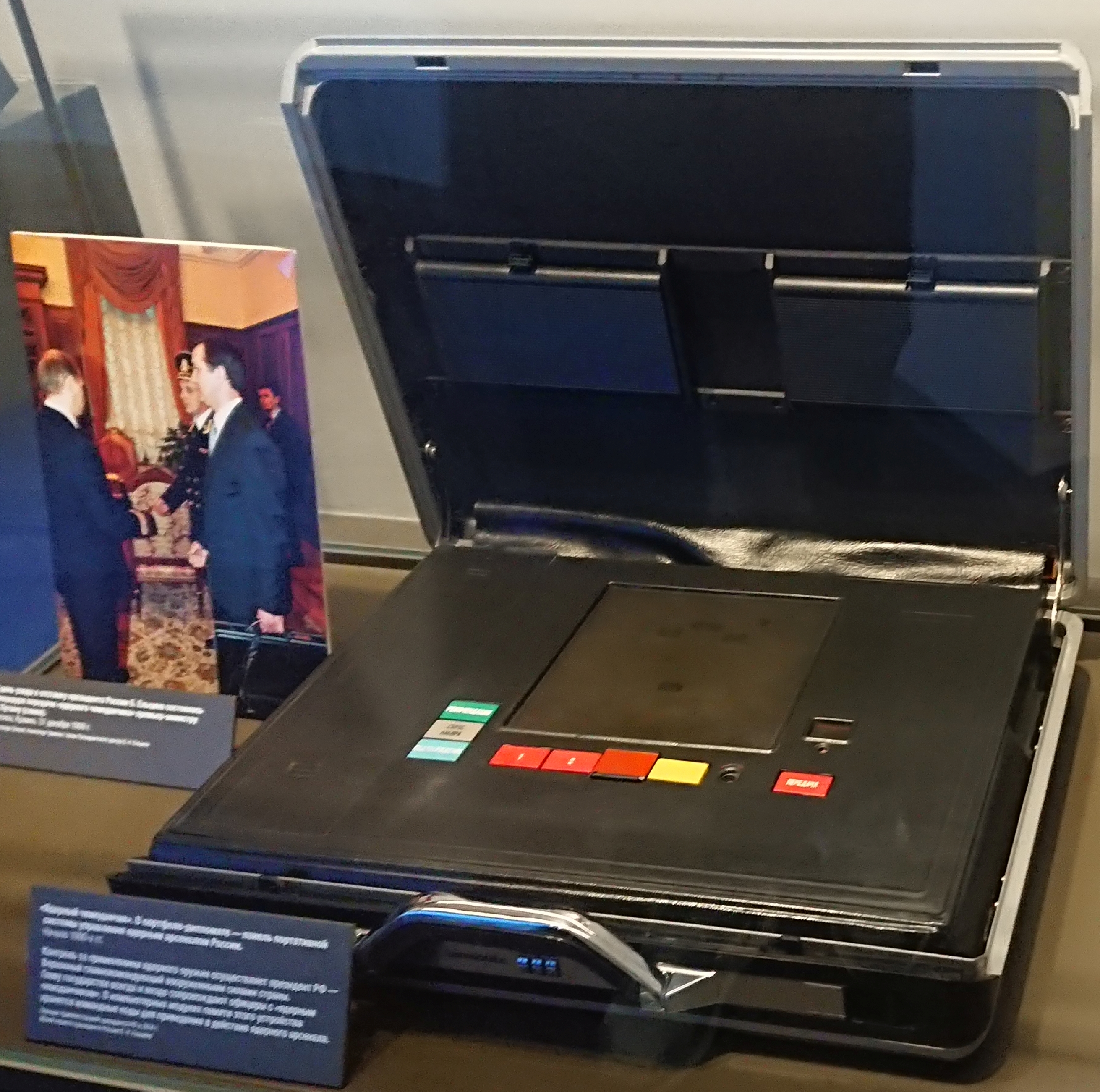
The Russian "nuclear briefcase" from the early 1990s on display at the Boris Yeltsin Presidential Center in Yekaterinburg.

Cheget (Russian: Чегет) is a "nuclear briefcase" (named after Mount Cheget in Kabardino-Balkaria) and a part of the automatic system for the command and control of Russia's Strategic Nuclear Forces (SNF) named Kazbek (Казбек, named after Mount Kazbek on the Georgia–Russia border). From when it was first developed, a "nuclear suitcase" has been available to the Russian head of state, Minister of Defense and the head of the General Staff.

== History ==
The cheget was developed during Yuri Andropov's administration in the early 1980s. The suitcase was put into service just as Mikhail Gorbachev took office as General Secretary of the Communist Party of the Soviet Union in March 1985. It is connected to the special communications system code-named Kavkaz (Кавказ, the Russian name for the Caucasus region), which "supports communication between senior government officials while they are making the decision whether to use nuclear weapons, and in its own turn is plugged into Kazbek, which embraces all the individuals and agencies involved in command and control of the Strategic Nuclear Forces."

The President of Russia (the Supreme Commander-in-Chief) has a cheget on hand at all times. It is one of three, with the other two held by the Minister of Defence and the Chief of the General Staff. It may be that affirmations from two of the three are needed to trigger an actual launch. The General Staff receives the signal and initiates the nuclear strike through the passing of authorization codes to missile silo launch complexes/ballistic missile submarines or by remotely launching individual land-based intercontinental ballistic missiles (ICBMs)/submarine-launched ballistic missiles (SLBMs).

On 25 January 1995, the cheget was activated in response to a misidentified three-stage scientific sounding rocket (Brant XII as third stage) launched by Norwegian and U.S. scientists; it was the only known time a nuclear briefcase has been activated in preparation for an attack.

== Gallery ==
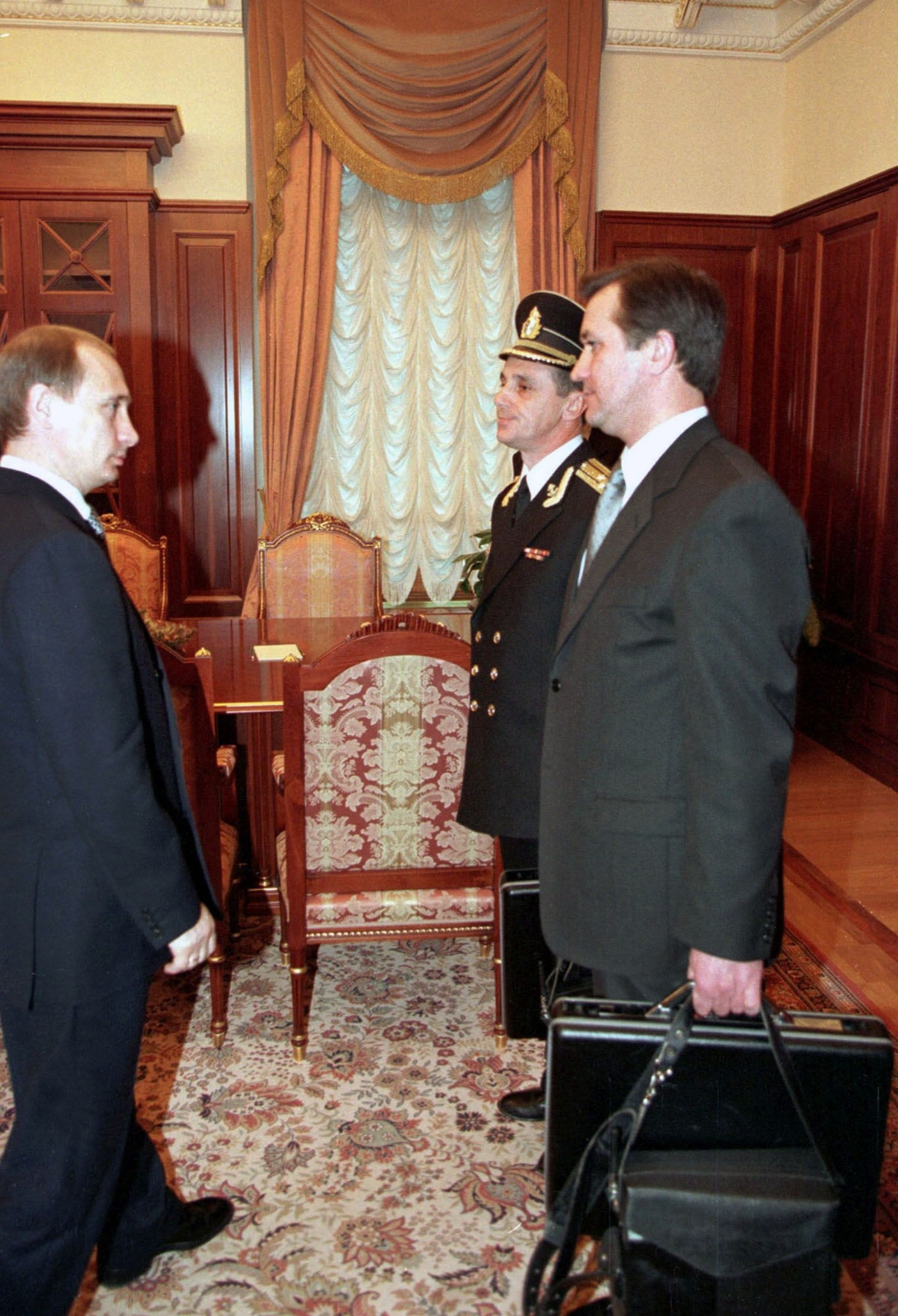
Then-Acting President Vladimir Putin receiving the "nuclear briefcase" on 31 December 1999.

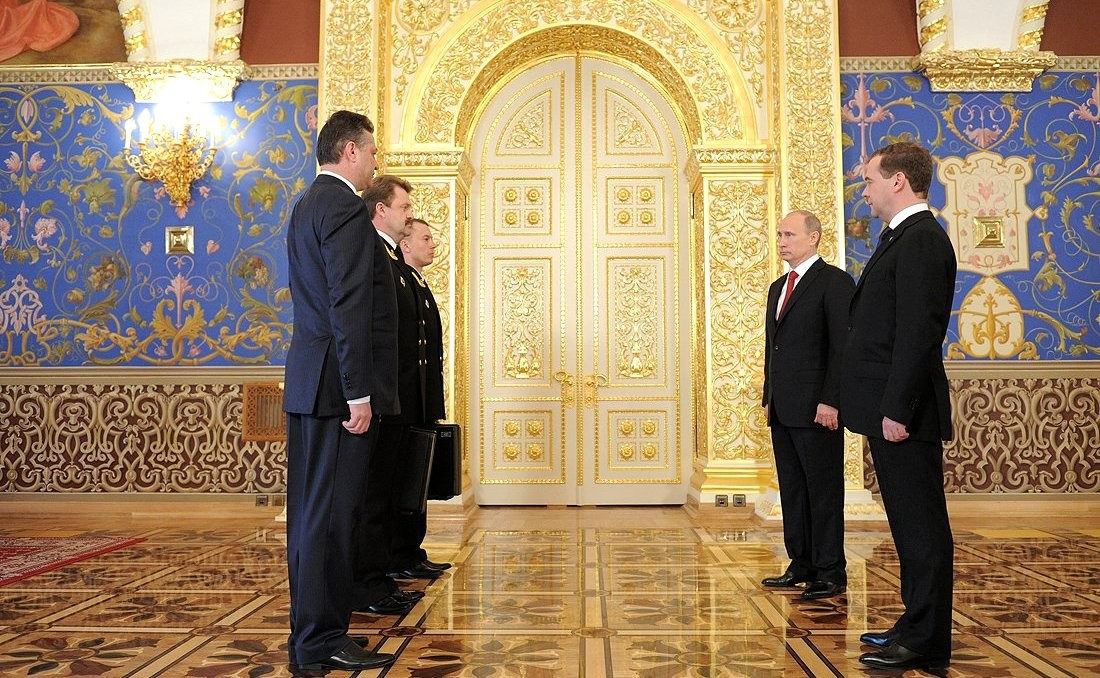
The ceremony of passing the "nuclear briefcase" during Vladimir Putin's third inauguration on 7 May 2012.

== See also ==
- Designated survivor – a person chosen from the US Presidential line of succession to be kept distant from the others
- Nuclear football – the American counterpart to Cheget
- Letters of last resort – the British counterpart to Cheget
- Two-man rule
- Cold War
- World War III
- Dead Hand – Soviet nuclear-control system
