= Black Brant (rocket) =

Family of Canadian-designed sounding rockets

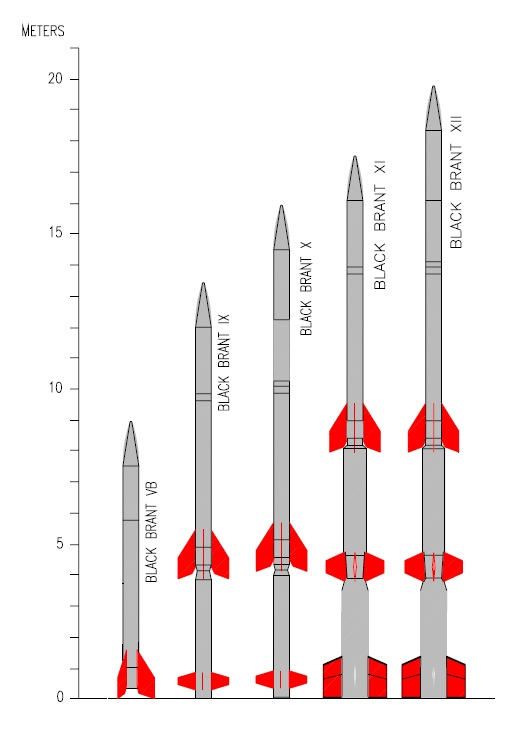
Black Brant sounding rockets

The Black Brant is a family of Canadian-designed sounding rockets originally built by Bristol Aerospace, since absorbed by Magellan Aerospace in Winnipeg, Manitoba. Over 800 Black Brants of various versions have been launched since they were first produced in 1961, and the type remains one of the most popular sounding rockets. They have been repeatedly used by the Canadian Space Agency and NASA.

== History ==
Black Brant was the result of research at Canadian Armament Research and Development Establishment (CARDE) during the 1950s into the nature of the upper part of the atmosphere as part of ongoing research into anti-ballistic missile systems and very-long-range communication. In 1957, CARDE contracted Bristol to produce a simple rocket fuselage, called the Propulsion Test Vehicle, for studies into high-power solid fuels. The resulting design, by Albert Fia, was quite heavy, as it was designed to be able to accommodate a wide variety of engine burning times, propellant loadings and launch angles in keeping with its role as a test vehicle for ABM systems development. The first test flight took place only two years later from the Churchill Rocket Research Range in September 1959.

CARDE's attention later turned to long-distance communications and they found the Propulsion Test Vehicle system useful as a sounding rocket. To better suit this role, Bristol modified the design to be lighter and more tailored to the sounding rocket role. This became the Black Brant, sharing the name with the Black Brant goose. CARDE launched a number of Black Brant rockets over the next few years, both the original Black Brant I design which could place a 68 kg (150 lb) payload to 150 km (93 mi) altitude, as well as the larger Black Brant II which first flew in October 1960, and the smaller but higher-altitude Black Brant III.

The rocket's design emphasized reliability over payload and range. In July 1963 the much larger Black Brant V first flew, which was also used as a booster stage for the Black Brant III to make the Black Brant IV. The IV first flew in 1964, but failed, as did the next test launch. Aside from these two launches, which were corrected for, the Black Brant has never had another failure, making it one of the most reliable rockets in history. Since then it has undergone continual evolution, and the current versions are the XI and XII, consisting of Black Brant V used as an upper stage, with Talos and Terrier boosters as lower stages. They have reached altitudes of more than 1,500 km (930 mi), which is above the ionosphere and well above the orbits of the Space Shuttle and the International Space Station.

The propellant designs developed by CARDE in the Black Brant program were the highest performing solid fuels of their day. Bristol then placed this propellant in a new 70 mm (2.8 in) rocket to form the CRV7, the first rocket capable of penetrating standard Warsaw Pact aircraft hangars. The CRV7 has since gone on to become the de facto standard rocket for most Western-aligned militaries.

In 1976, Australia and Canada through the National Research Council Canada (NRCC) agreed to launch a rocket from Woomera Test Range. The Black Brant VB rocket was launched there on 9 November for experiments in the ionosphere. Later, NASA would launch a number of Black Brant IX.

At present, due to its 98% success rate, it remains one of the most popular sounding rockets ever built. The rockets have been used repeatedly by the Canadian Space Agency and NASA. There is a 1:1 scale model of the Black Brant IX rocket in front of the head office of the Canadian Space Agency in Saint-Hubert, east of Montréal. A full-scale Black Brant VC is on display in the Science Gallery of The Manitoba Museum in Winnipeg, Manitoba, Canada, and a Black Brant IV B replica is located at the Royal Aviation Museum of Western Canada also in Winnipeg.

In 1995, a Black Brant XII four-stage sounding rocket from the Andøya Rocket Range off the northwestern coast of Norway caused the Norwegian rocket incident, also known as the Black Brant scare. The trajectory resembled that of a U.S. Navy submarine-launched Trident missile. Russian nuclear forces were put on high alert as a result, fearing a high-altitude nuclear attack that could blind Russian radar, and Russia's "nuclear briefcase", the Cheget, was brought to Russian president Boris Yeltsin, who then had to decide whether to launch a retaliatory nuclear strike against the United States. It is the first and thus far only known incident where any nuclear-weapons state had its nuclear briefcase activated and prepared for launching an attack.

On September 19, 2009, a Black Brant XII that was launched to study clouds caused numerous calls from the northeastern U.S. reporting "strange lights in the sky". NASA reported that the light came from an artificial noctilucent cloud formed by the exhaust particles of the rocket's fourth stage at an altitude of about 278 km (173 mi).

== Versions ==
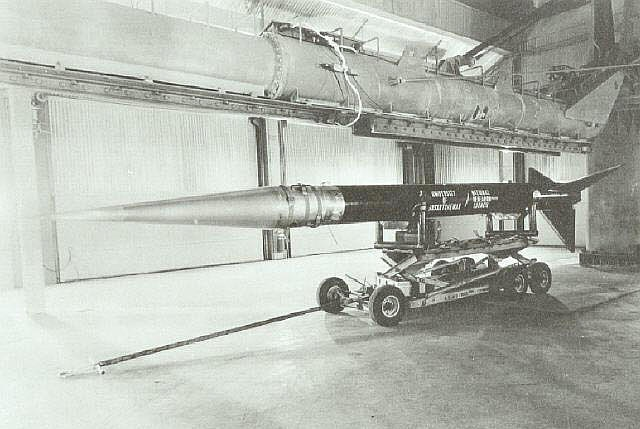
Black Brant I

=== Black Brant I ===
- Black Brant I
- Payload: 68 kg (150 lb)
- Maximum flight height: 225 km (140 mi)
- Launch thrust: 111 kN (25,000 lb_{f})
- Launch mass: 730 kg (1,610 lb)
- Diameter: 0.26 m (10 in)
- Length: 7.41 m (24.3 ft)

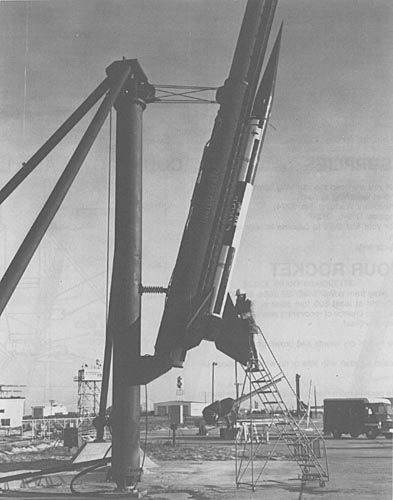
Black Brant II

=== Black Brant II ===
- Black Brant II, Black Brant IIB
- Payload: 68 kg (150 lb) (Black Brant II)
- Maximum flight height: 274 km (170 mi)
- Thrust: 89 kN (20,000 lb_{f})
- Mass at launch: 800 kg (1,800 lb)
- Diameter: 0.44 m (1 ft 5 in)
- Length: 8.45 m (27.7 ft)

The II was the first rocket for scientific use and was ready in 1960.

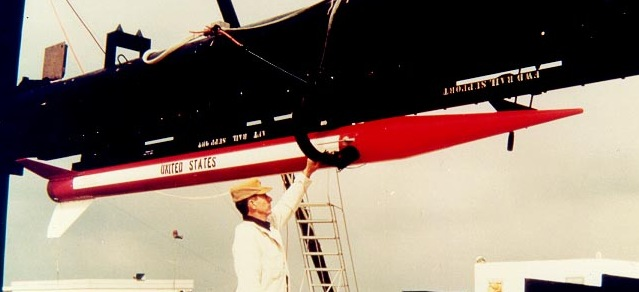
Black Brant III

=== Black Brant III ===
- Black Brant III, Black Brant IIIA, Black Brant IIIB
- Payload: 18 kg (40 lb) (Black Brant III)
- Maximum flight height: 177 km (110 mi)
- Thrust: 49 kN (11,000 lb_{f})
- Mass at launch: 286 kg (631 lb)
- Diameter: 0.26 m (10 in)
- Length: 5.50 m (18.0 ft)

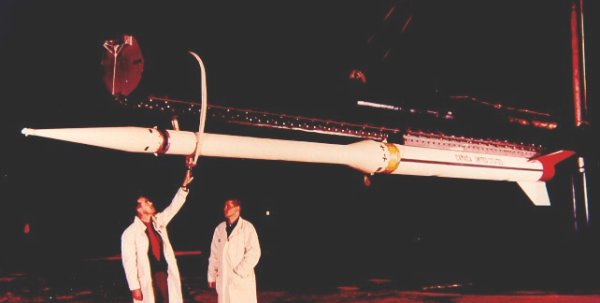
Black Brant IV

=== Black Brant IV ===
- Black Brant IV is a two-stage rocket consisting of Black Brant VA first stage with either a Black Brant IIIA or IIIB second stage, Black Brant IVA, Black Brant IVB
- Payload: 100 kg (220 lb) (Black Brant IV)
- Maximum flight height: 1,000 km (620 mi)
- Thrust: 111 kN (25,000 lb_{f})
- Mass at launch: 1,356 kg (2,989 lb)
- Diameter: 0.44 m (1 ft 5 in)
- Length: 11.06 m (36.3 ft)

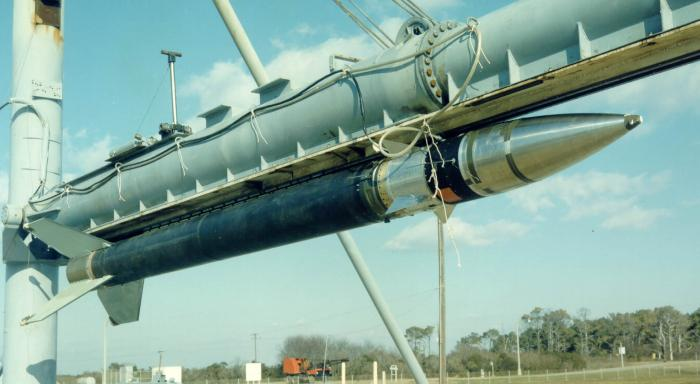
Black Brant VC

=== Black Brant V ===
- Black Brant V, Black Brant VA, Black Brant VB, Black Brant VC
- Payload: 68 kg (150 lb) (Black Brant V)
- Maximum flight height: 387 km (240 mi)
- Thrust: 111 kN (25,000 lb_{f})
- Mass at launch: 1,197 kg (2,639 lb)
- Diameter: 0.44 m (1 ft 5 in)
- Length: 8.15 m (26.7 ft)
- First launch:
  - VA: 1972-03-16 (ICECAP 72)
  - VB: 1965-06-12 (Test 1)
  - VC: 1970-04-04 (EUV)
- Last launch:
  - VA: 1999-07-14 (MD-DR-13 DROPPS-2)
  - VB: 2002-02-21 (CODA)
  - VC: 2024-09-02 (BOLT-1B)
- Total launches: 28 (VA), 66 (VB), 109 (VC)
- Successful launches: 25 (VA), 63 (VB), 105 (VC)

=== Black Brant VI ===
- Black Brant VI
- Maximum flight height: 72 km (45 mi)
- Thrust: 7 kN (1,600 lb_{f})
- Mass at launch: 100 kg (220 lb)
- Diameter: 0.12 m (4.7 in)
- Length: 2.80 m (9 ft 2 in)

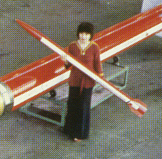
Black Brant VII model

=== Black Brant VII ===
- Black Brant VII
- Maximum flight height: 72 km (45 mi)
- Thrust: 7 kN (1,600 lb_{f})
- Mass at launch: 100 kg (220 lb)
- Diameter: 0.12 m (4.7 in)
- Length: 2.80 m (9 ft 2 in)

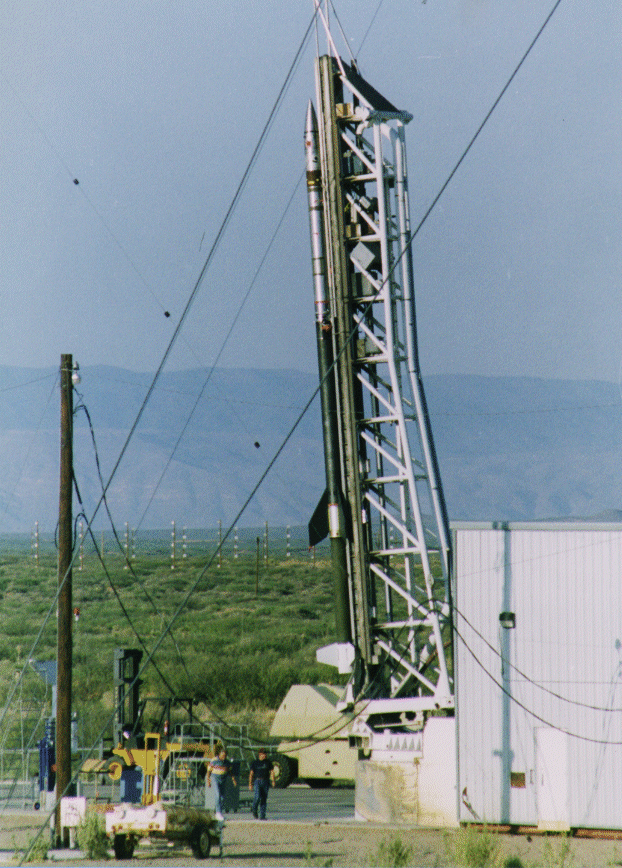
Black Brant VIII

=== Black Brant VIII ===
- Black Brant VIII (a.k.a. Nike Black Brant) is a two-stage rocket with a Nike M5-E1 booster first stage and either a Black Brant VB or VC second stage, Black Brant VIIIB, Black Brant VIIIC
- Maximum flight height: 340 km (210 mi) (Black Brant VIII)
- Thrust: 196 kN (44,000 lb_{f})
- Mass at launch: 2,000 kg (4,400 lb)
- Diameter: 0.44 m (1 ft 5 in)
- Length: 11.90 m (39.0 ft)

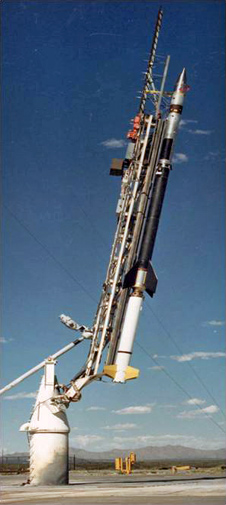
Black Brant IX

=== Black Brant IX ===
- Status: Active
- Black Brant IX (a.k.a. Terrier Black Brant) is a two-stage rocket with a Terrier Mk 70 booster first stage and a Black Brant VB second stage, Black Brant IXB, Black Brant IXBM1, Black Brant IXCM1, Terrier Black Brant XI Mod 2
- Maximum flight height: 300 km (190 mi)
- Mass at launch: 2,200 kg (4,900 lb) (Black Brant IX)
- Diameter: 0.46 m (1 ft 6 in)
- Length: 12.20 m (40.0 ft)
- First launch: 1982-03-16
- Last launch: 2025-08-28 02:48 UTC (TOMEX-Plus)
- Total launches: 336
- Successful launches: 330

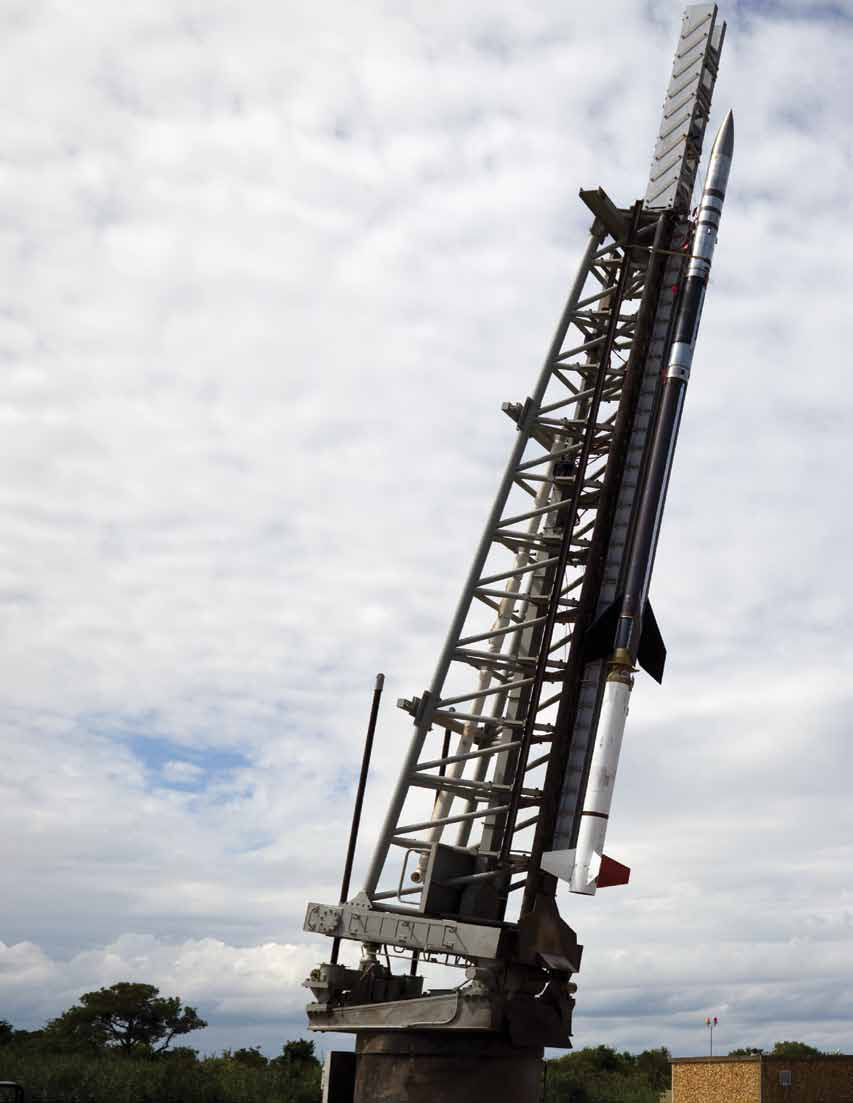
Black Brant X

=== Black Brant X ===
- Black Brant X (a.k.a. Terrier Black Brant Nihka) is a three-stage rocket with a Terrier Mk 70 booster first stage, a Black Brant VB or VC second stage and a Nihka third, Black Brant XB, Black Brant XCM1
- Payload: 90 kg (200 lb) (Black Brant X)
- Maximum flight height: 900 km (560 mi)
- Thrust: 257 kN (58,000 lb_{f})
- Mass at launch: 2,600 kg (5,700 lb)
- Diameter: 0.44 m (1 ft 5 in)
- Length: 14.50 m (47.6 ft)

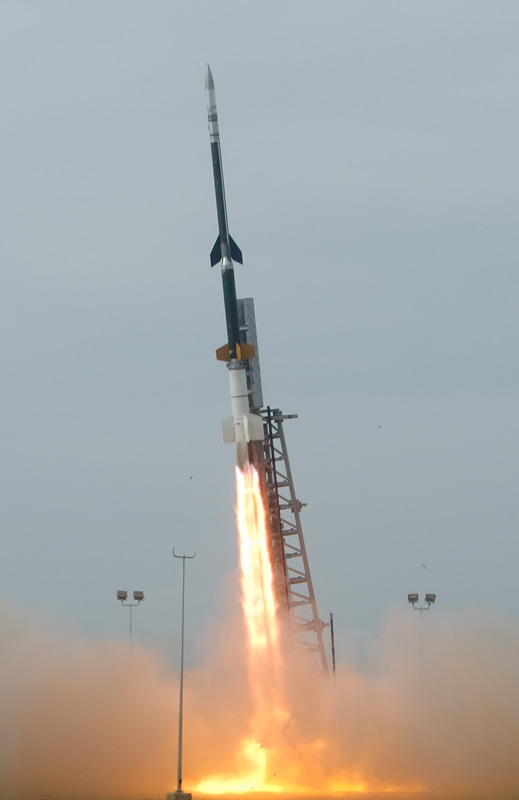
Black Brant XI

=== Black Brant XI ===
- Black Brant XI (a.k.a. Talos Taurus Black Brant) is a three-stage rocket with a Talos booster first stage, Taurus booster second stage, and a Black Brant V third stage, Black Brant XIA
- Payload: 320 kg (710 lb) to 500 km (310 mi) altitude, or 550 kilograms (1,210 lb) to 300 km (190 mi) altitude (Black Brant XI)
- Maximum flight height: 1,400 km (870 mi)
- Thrust:
- Mass at launch: 5,300 kg (11,700 lb)
- Diameter: 0.76 m (2 ft 6 in)
- Length: 17.00 m (55.77 ft)

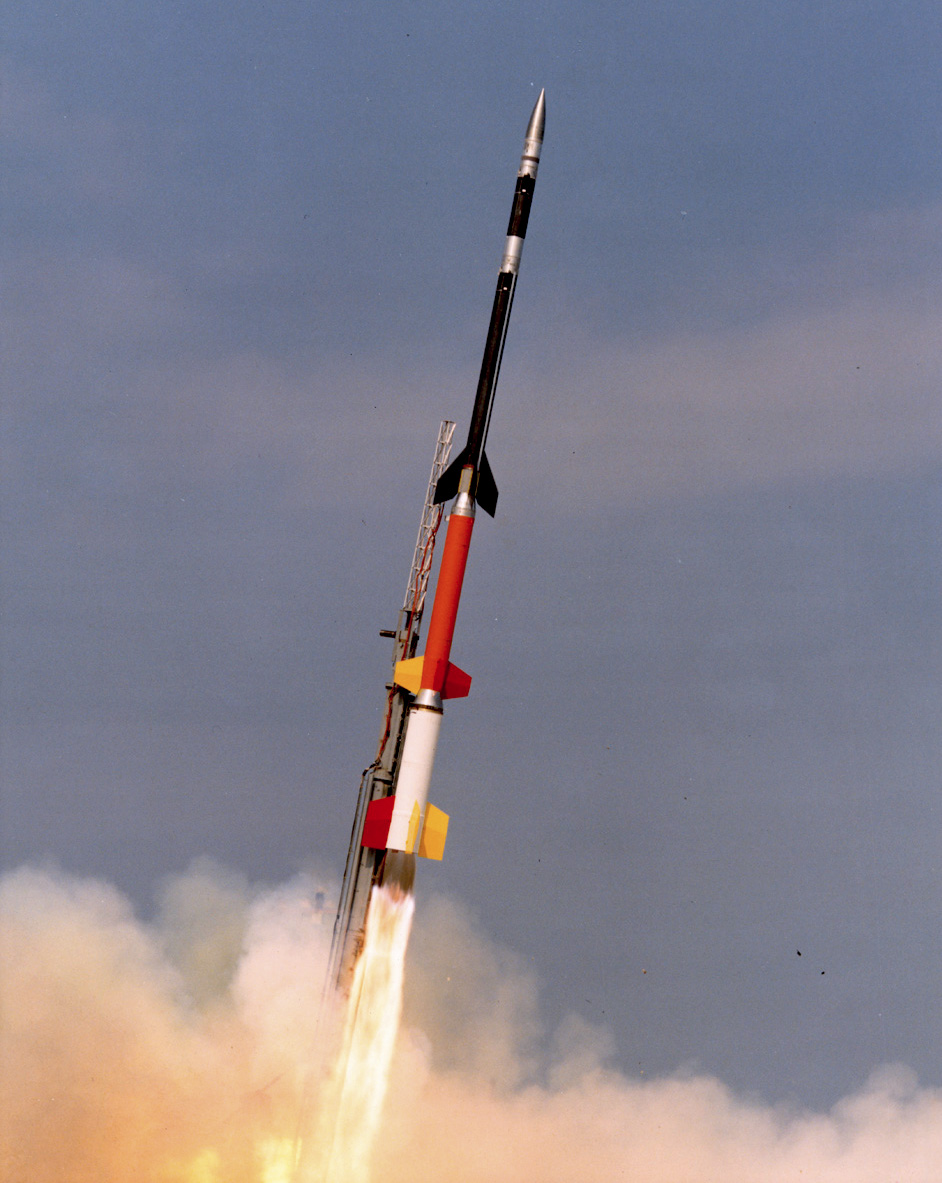
Black Brant XII

=== Black Brant XII ===
- Black Brant XII (a.k.a. Talos Terrier Black Brant Nihka) is a four-stage rocket with a Mk 11 Mod 5 Talos booster first stage, Terrier booster second stage (pre 2013 Taurus booster motors were used), Black Brant V third stage and Nihka fourth stage, Black Brant XIIA
- Payload: manufacturer rated from 110–410 kg (240–900 lb) (Black Brant XII)
- Maximum flight height: Approximately 1,500 km (930 mi), dependent on payload
- Thrust: 116,001 lbf first stage Talos booster
- Mass at launch: Approximately 5,300 kg (11,700 lb), dependent on payload
- Diameter:
- Length: 15 m (49 ft)
- First launch: 30 September 1988 (BEARS)
- Last launch: 25 March 2025 (AWESOME)
- Total launches: 36 (28 Black Brant XII, 8 Black Brant XII-A)
- Successful launches: 34 (26 Black Brant XII, 8 Black Brant XII-A)

== See also ==
- Norwegian rocket incident
- South Atlantic Anomaly Probe
