= Nuclear briefcase =

Case used to authorize nuclear weapons

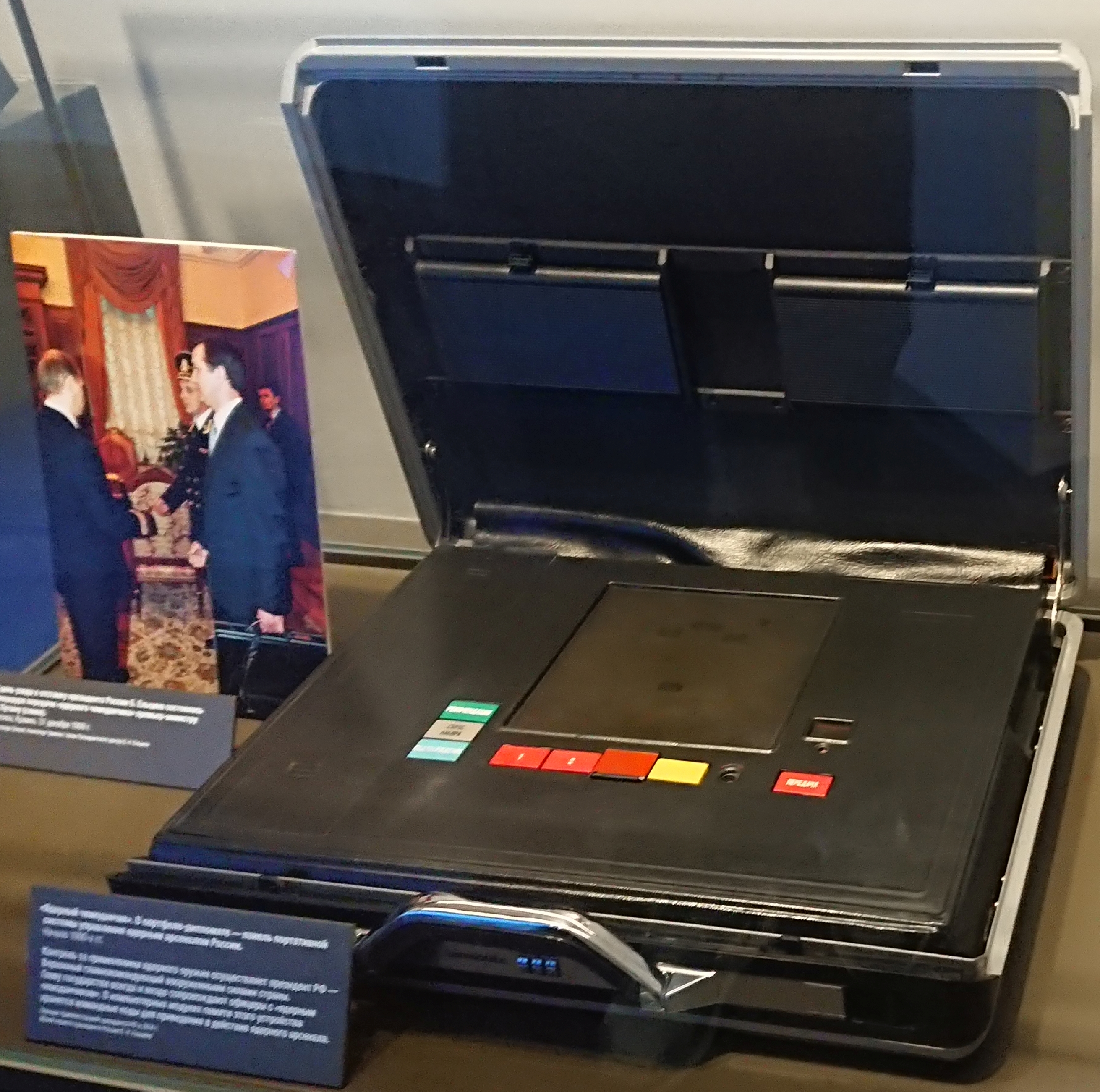
A Russian nuclear briefcase, code-named Cheget

A nuclear briefcase is a specially outfitted briefcase used to authorize the use of nuclear weapons and is usually kept near the leader of a nuclear weapons state at all times.

== France ==
In France, the nuclear briefcase does not officially exist. A black briefcase called the "mobile base" follows the president in all their trips, but it is not specifically devoted to nuclear force.

== India ==
India does not have a nuclear briefcase. In India, the Political Council of the Nuclear Command Authority (NCA) must collectively authorize the use of nuclear weapons. The NCA Executive Council gives its opinion to the Political Council, which authorises a nuclear attack when deemed necessary. While the Executive Council is chaired by the National Security Advisor (NSA), the Political Council is chaired by the Prime Minister. This mechanism was implemented to ensure that Indian nuclear weapons remain firmly in civilian control and that there exists a sophisticated command-and-control mechanism to prevent their accidental or unauthorised use.

The Prime Minister is often accompanied by Special Protection Group personnel carrying a black briefcase. It contains foldable Kevlar protection armor, essential documents and has a pocket that can hold a pistol.

== Russia ==
Russia's "nuclear briefcase" is code-named Cheget. It "supports communication between senior government officials while they are making the decision whether to use nuclear weapons, and in its own turn is plugged into the special Kazbek communication system, which includes all the individuals and agencies involved in command and control of the Strategic Nuclear Forces." It is usually assumed, although not known with certainty, that the nuclear briefcases are also issued to the Minister of Defence and the Chief of the General Staff.

== United States ==
=== Contents ===
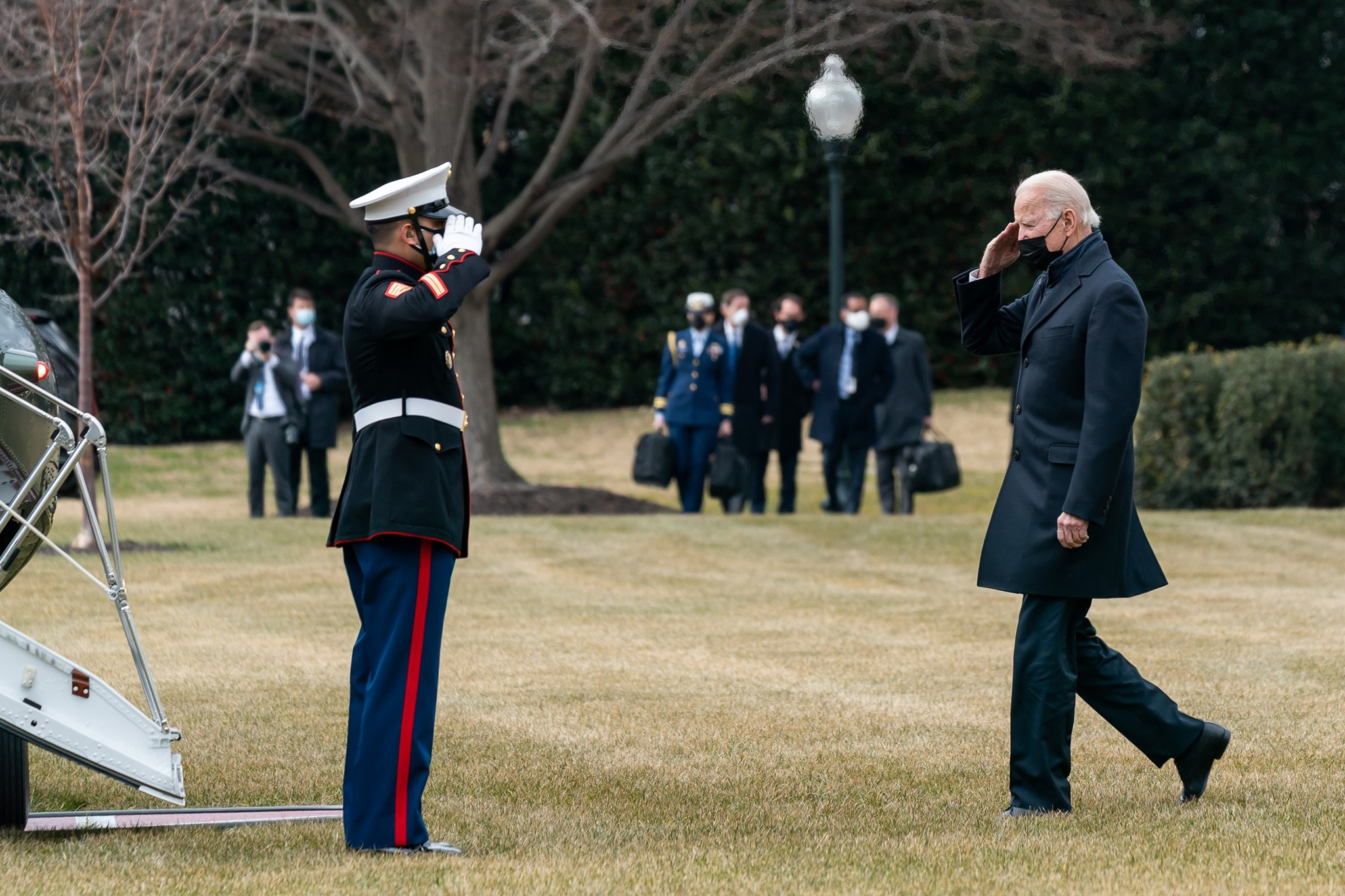
President Biden about to board Marine One—the military aide at back-center is carrying the nuclear football

In his 1980 book Breaking Cover, Bill Gulley, former director of the White House Military Office, wrote:

There are four things in the Football. The Black Book containing the retaliatory options, a book listing classified site locations, a manila folder with eight or ten pages stapled together giving a description of procedures for the Emergency Broadcast System, and a three-by-five-inch [7.5 × 13 cm] card with authentication codes. The Black Book was about 9 by 12 inches [23 × 30 cm] and had 75 loose-leaf pages printed in black and red. The book with classified site locations was about the same size as the Black Book, and was black. It contained information on sites around the country where the president could be taken in an emergency.

The president is always accompanied by a military aide carrying the nuclear football with launch codes for nuclear weapons. It has been described both as a metal Zero Halliburton briefcase and as a leather briefcase weighing about 45 pounds (20 kg), with photographic evidence existing of the latter. A small antenna protrudes from the bag near the handle, suggesting that it also contains communications equipment of some kind.

A popular misconception, sometimes deriving from pop culture, is that the football contains a large red button, which when pressed, launches a nuclear attack.

=== Operation ===
Video describing the United States' nuclear launch authorization process

If the U.S. president, who is the commander-in-chief of the armed forces, decides to order the use of nuclear weapons, the briefcase would be opened. A command signal, or "watch" alert, would be issued to the United States Strategic Command and perhaps the Joint Chiefs of Staff. The president would review the attack options with others such as the secretary of defense and the chairman of the Joint Chiefs of Staff and decide on a plan, which could range from the launch of a single ICBM or nuclear-armed bomber to options for multiple, even hundreds of ICBMs or bombers. These are among the preset war plans developed under OPLAN 8010 (formerly the Single Integrated Operational Plan). A two-person verification procedure would precede the entering of the codes into a permissive action link.

Before the order can be followed by the military, the president must be positively identified using a special code issued on a plastic card, nicknamed the "biscuit". The authentication is conducted between the president and the National Military Command Center deputy director of operations, using a challenge code of two phonetic letters. The president will read, from the biscuit, the daily phonetic letters, and the deputy director will confirm or deny that it is correct, confirmation indicating the person is the president and the attack orders can be given. Down the chain of command, the United States has a two-man rule in place at nuclear launch facilities. This verification process ensures the order came from the actual president. Many sources indicate that the president has sole launch authority, and the defense secretary has no veto power. A Congressional Research Service provides a detailed reason: There is a short time before nuclear weapons from adversaries will strike US soil and a similar short time when advisers relay options to the US President. During the Cold War, some analysts argued that a launch under attack was the best option, and that the command and control system was designed to permit such a quick launch of U.S. nuclear weapons. The time for any US response was noted as thirty minutes. Secondly, the US may conduct a pre-emptive strike if the assessment was its territory or allies were facing an imminent nuclear attack. The chairman of the Joint Chiefs of Staff will also be an advisor to the President, but is by law only allowed to advise, and has no operational control over US forces. The secretary of defense also advises but the Goldwater–Nichols Act Section 162(b) states the chain of command to a unified or specified combatant command runs "from the president to the secretary of defense," and "from the secretary of defense to the commander of the combatant command".

However, it has been argued that the president may not have sole authority to initiate a nuclear attack because the defense secretary is required to verify the order but cannot veto it. U.S. law dictates that the attack must be lawful; military officers are required to refuse to execute unlawful orders, such as those that violate international humanitarian law.

Some military officials, including General John Hyten, have testified to the U.S. Congress that they would refuse to carry out an unlawful order for a nuclear strike. In addition, off-the-shelf strike packages are pre-vetted by lawyers to confirm that they are legal and, thus, such a strike would be presumed to be a lawful order.

Military service members have been reprimanded for questioning U.S. protocols for nuclear strike authority. In 1975, Major Harold Hering was discharged from the Air Force for asking, "How can I know that an order I receive to launch my missiles came from a sane president?" Nevertheless, the president, once in office, as noted by former defense secretary William Perry and Tom Z. Collina, retains the sole authority to launch a nuclear strike or attack.

The football is carried by one of the rotating presidential military aides (one from each of the six armed forces service branches), whose work schedule is top-secret. This person is a commissioned officer in the U.S. military, pay-grade O-4 or above, who has undergone the nation's most rigorous background check (Yankee White). These officers are required to keep the football readily accessible to the president at all times. Consequently, this officer carries the football either standing or walking near the president at all times, including riding on Air Force One, on Marine One, or in the presidential motorcade with the president.

There are three nuclear footballs in total; two are allocated to the president and vice president, with the last being stored in the White House. The practice of also providing an aide with a football to the vice president, to whom command authority would devolve if the president is disabled or deceased, began during the Carter administration. In presidential transitions, the president-elect does not receive the actual nuclear code card until after the nuclear briefing, which usually occurs when "he meets with the outgoing president at the White House just before the actual inauguration ceremony. The code card is activated electronically right after the president-elect takes the oath at noon".

If the outgoing president is not present at the inauguration—as happened in 2021 when Donald Trump did not attend the inauguration of Joe Biden but stayed in Florida—one football is kept with him and remains active until 11:59:59 a.m. on inauguration day. After that point, the now-former president is denied access to the football, its codes are automatically deactivated, and the aide carrying the football returns to Washington, D.C. In the meantime, the incoming president receives one of the spare footballs at the pre-inauguration nuclear briefing, as well as a "biscuit" with codes that become active at 12:00:00 noon.

According to military analyst and whistleblower Daniel Ellsberg, presidents beginning with Dwight D. Eisenhower have in fact delegated nuclear launch authority to military commanders who may then sub-delegate authority further. In Ellsberg's view, the nuclear football is primarily a piece of political theater, a hoax that obscures the real chain of nuclear command and control. Effective deterrence requires it, because otherwise a single nuclear detonation on Washington would prevent retaliation.

== See also ==
- Letters of last resort (United Kingdom)
- Suitcase nuclear device
