= Western Allies =

Group of Allied countries in World War II

Western Allies was a political and geographic grouping among the Allied powers of World War II.

== Grouping ==
The term primarily refers to the United States and the United Kingdom, and sometimes France, with the exclusion of the Soviet Union in the context of the European theatre of World War II. Western Allies has also been used more broadly to include lesser Allied countries from the British Commonwealth such as Canada, Australia, and New Zealand, and some Western European countries such as Belgium, the Netherlands, and Norway.

The concept of Western Allies is usually used to denote the major differences between the "Western" Allies (capitalist and liberal democratic) and the Soviet Union (communist and totalitarian). The cooperation between individual Western Allies powers (such as exchange of military intelligence) was much more intensive than that between the Western Allies and the Soviet Union. Cooperation became more significant in later stages of the war (e.g. the Tehran Conference). Nonetheless, the tensions remained high, with Western Allies and Soviet Union considering one another a threat, and drawing contingency plans for a war against one another (e.g. Operation Unthinkable, Plan Totality); these tensions developed into the Cold War that lasted decades after the World War II ended. In Allied-occupied Germany and Austria, the term Western Allies referred to the occupation zones of the United States, United Kingdom, and France, in contrast to the Soviet occupation zones.

Western Allies does not usually include Allied-aligned countries to the east of Nazi Germany and Fascist Italy, such as Poland, Czechoslovakia, Yugoslavia, as well as the Soviet Union and China are not included in the concept of "Western Allies", even though some (e.g. Polish and Czechoslovak armed forces) fought alongside the Western Allies.

== See also ==
- Cold War
- Molotov–Ribbentrop Pact
- Polish question
- Western Allied campaign in Romania
- Western Allied invasion of Germany
- Western betrayal
- Western Bloc
