= Operation Dropshot =

US Department of Defense codename

- Part of the Cold War
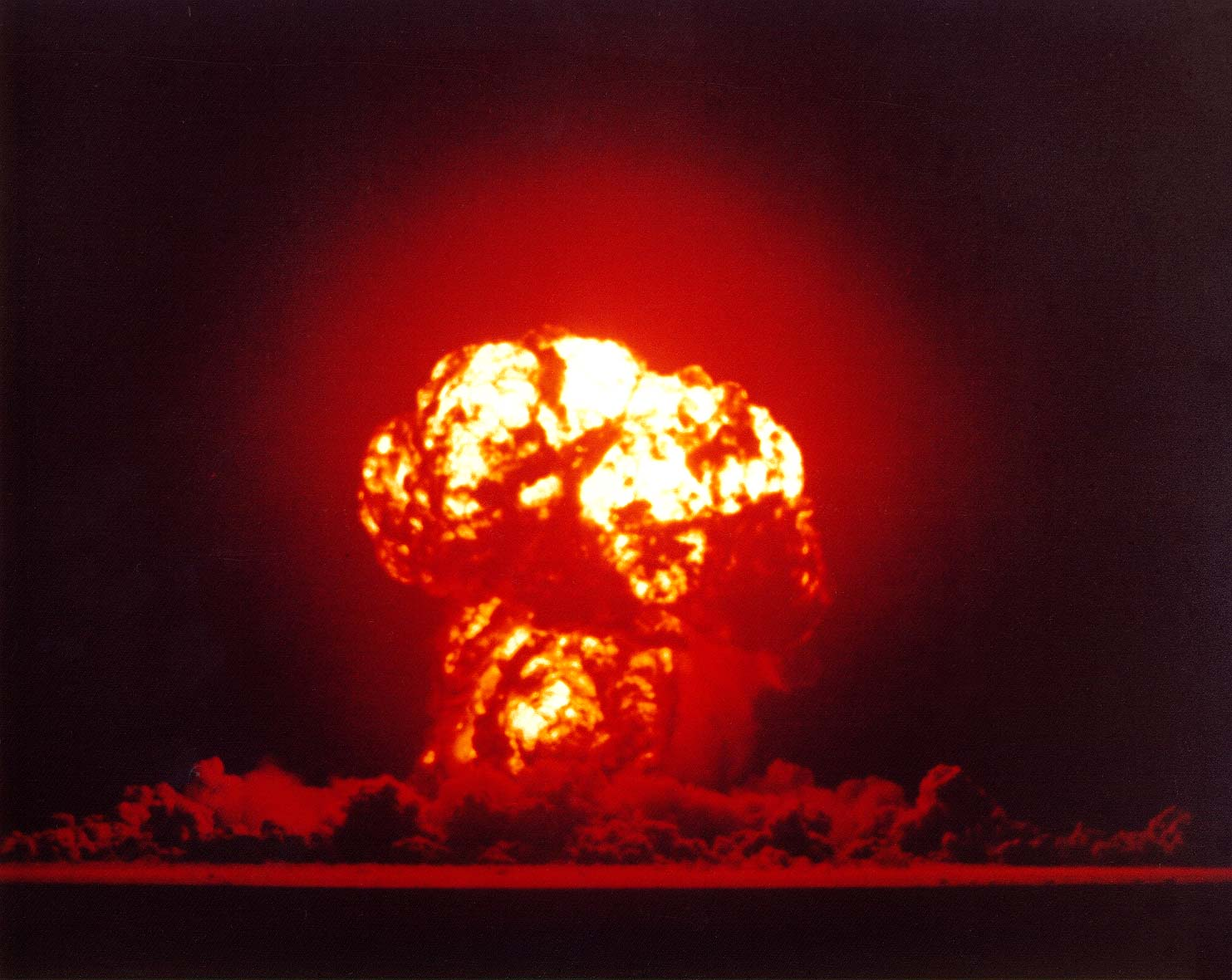
- Shot Apple 2, where the 723rd Tank Battalion participated in a tactical maneuver test as part of a nuclear test in 1955
Date	1 January 1957 (projected). Objectives: To impose the national war objectives of the United States on the USSR and its allies
Location	Western and Northern Europe, the Middle East, the North Atlantic, and the Far East
Status	Never carried out

Belligerents
United States: Western Bloc	Soviet Union: Soviet Bloc

Casualties and losses
none	none

Operation Dropshot was an American contingency military operation plan created in 1949 for possible wars (nuclear and conventional) against the Soviet Union and its Eastern European allies in the event of invasion and occupation of Western Europe, the Near East, and Eastern Asia. At that stage of the Cold War, the Department of Defense expected the Soviet Union to invade those places in 1957. Operation Dropshot included the contingent use of nuclear weapons against the military forces of the Soviet Union and of the Warsaw Pact.

In 1949, the American nuclear arsenal was small, based mostly in the continental United States, and depended upon bombers to deliver and drop atomic bombs on enemy targets. The plans of Operation Dropshot included mission profiles to deploy 300 nuclear bombs and 29,000 high-explosive bombs against 200 targets in 100 cities and towns throughout the USSR, in order to destroy approximately 85 percent of the industrial capabilities of the Soviet Union in a single strike; of the 300 nuclear weapons to be deployed, between 75 and 100 nuclear weapons were targeted to destroy the Soviet Union's combat aircraft on the ground.

The scenario for Operation Dropshot was conceptualized before the successful development of the intercontinental ballistic missile (ICBM), and indicated that the war plans would become void when ICBMs became cost-effective means for delivering nuclear weapons.

The military-plan documents for Operation Dropshot were declassified in 1977, and published in 1978 as the book Dropshot: The American Plan for World War III Against the Soviet Union in 1957. The Department of Defense did not approve Operation Dropshot, withdrawing it in February 1951. It was superseded by Reaper, a war plan anticipating a Soviet–American war in 1954.

== See also ==
- United States war plans (1945–1950)
- Plan Totality
- Operation Unthinkable
- Seven Days to the River Rhine
- Basic Encyclopedia

== Sources ==
- Ross, Steven T. (1996). American War Plans, 1945-1950: Strategies for Defeating the Soviet Union. Frank Cass.
- "Dropshot - American Plan for War with the Soviet Union 1957". www.allworldwars.com.
