= Kill house =

Training facility for urban combat

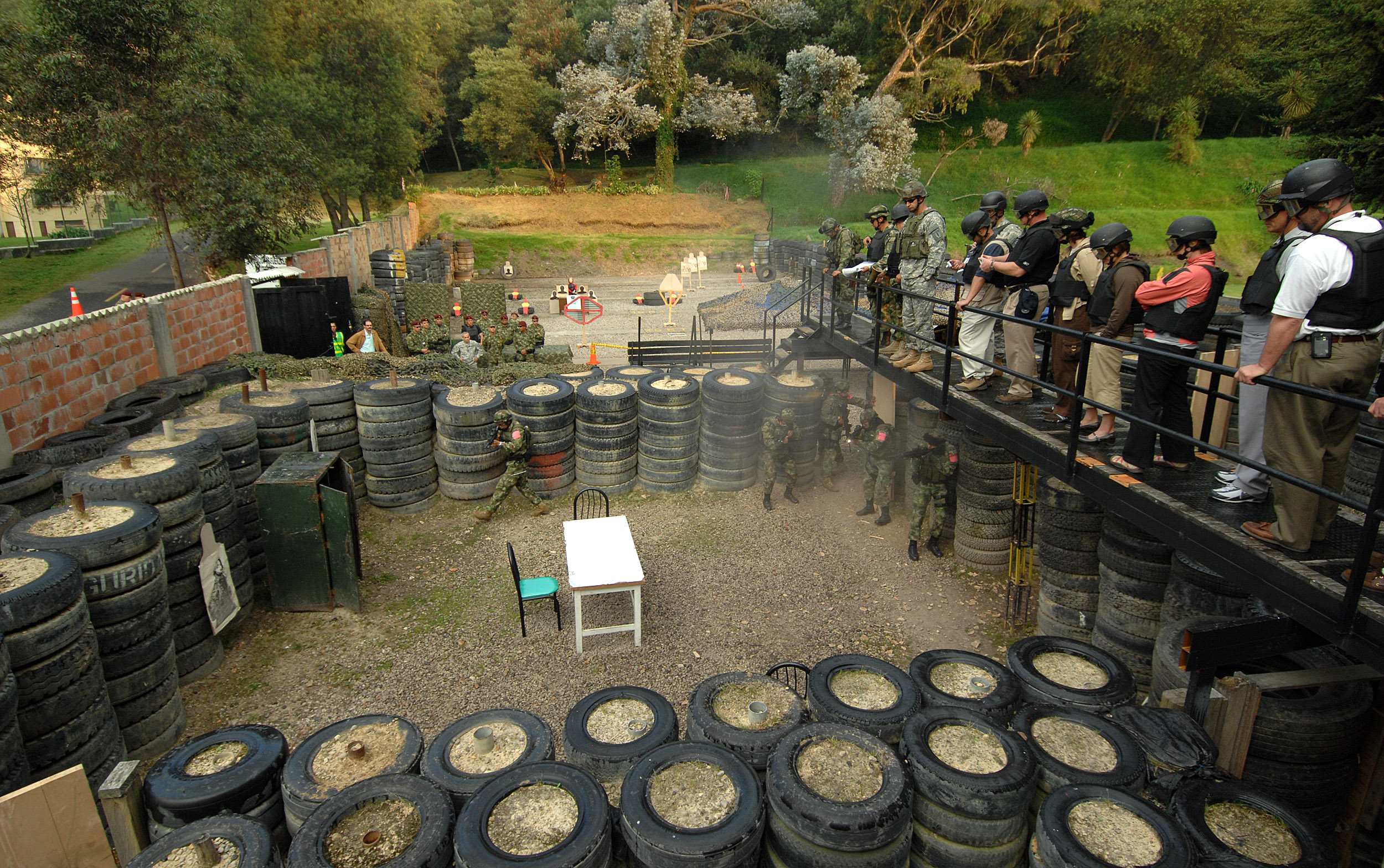
An open-air shoot house as used by Colombian special forces.

A kill house or shoot house is a live ammunition small arms shooting range used to train military and law enforcement personnel for close contact engagements in urban combat environments. Designed to mimic residential, commercial and industrial spaces, kill houses are used to acquaint personnel with techniques to infiltrate structures and the methods used to overwhelm the target(s) in the quickest and most efficient manner. The construction of one of these facilities can vary in material and cost depending on the needs and the resources available. Like any shooting range, there are rules that must be followed to ensure a safe kill house training session.

== Purpose ==
A kill or shoot house is a type of indoor firing range modified to resemble a residential environment and with walls and floor fortified to safely absorb rounds fired from close range. Ballistic panels, sheets or blocks are commonly used to absorb the rounds and not allow ricochets. It is used to train soldiers and police for various urban combat scenarios while permitting them to use their full power service weapons. The scenarios trained for include room and apartment clearing, door breaching and the inclusion of hostage or noncombatant targets along with enemy targets ("shoot/no shoot").

Simpler kill houses without the necessary fortification to be safe for live fire can be used for blank or dry fire training of the same variety. As necessary this can be reduced even further down to the "glass house", which is merely a residential floorplan marked out in full scale on the ground.

== History ==
The British Special Air Service pioneered the use of such CQB training facilities. Their Killing House was one of the first of its kind and was emulated by units from other countries.

The first kill house in continental Europe was built in 1947 in a police school in Zbiroh, today's Czech Republic, by WW2 veterans of the Czechoslovak Army in the West that had been trained in Britain.

== Construction ==
=== Materials ===
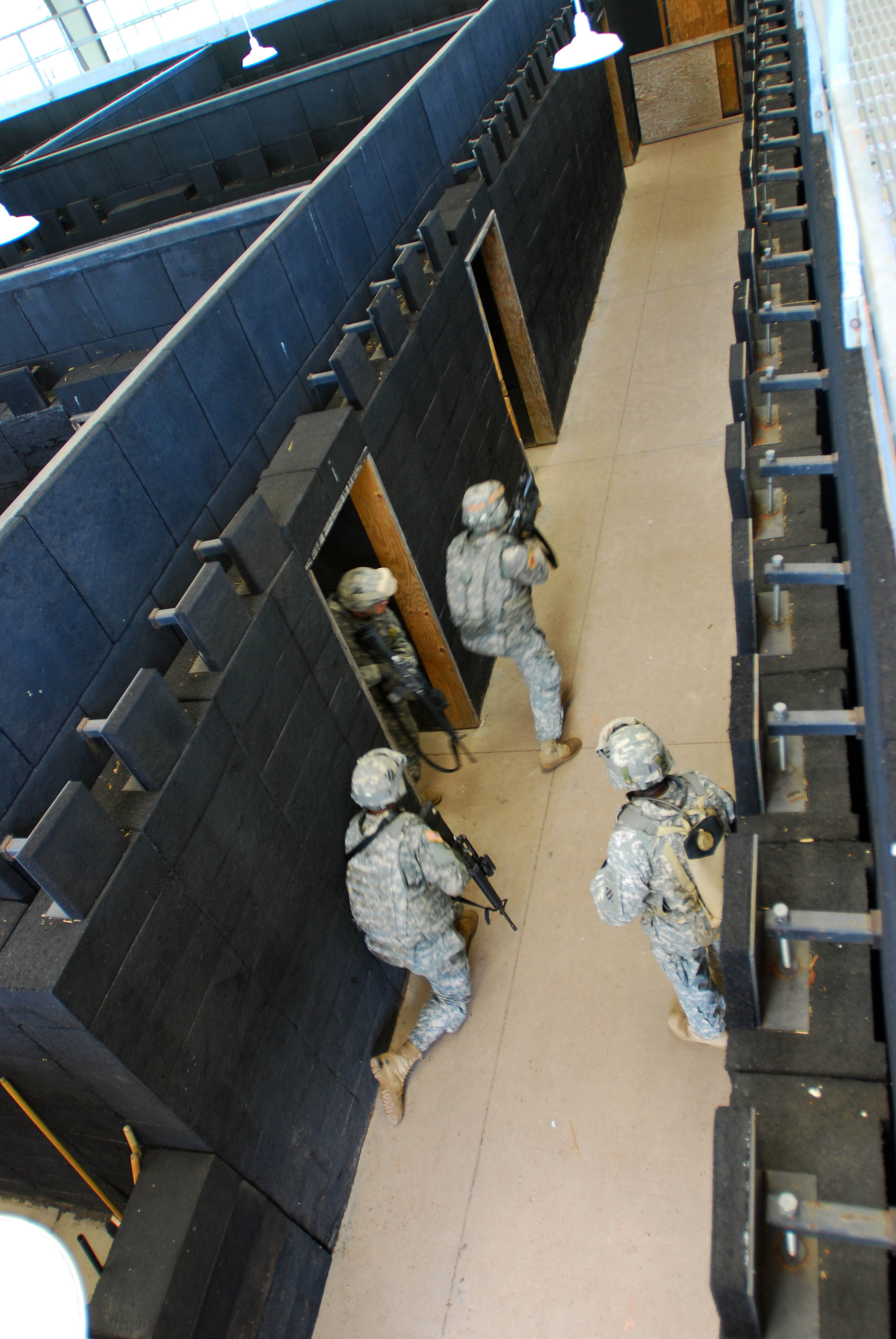
US Army live-fire shoot house showing construction layers.

Kill houses can be built from almost any materials, ranging from concrete to something as simple as plywood depending on the needs of the users of the kill house. For structures that need to contain and absorb gunfire, stronger materials are needed such as concrete or ballistic rubber. It's important to note that using materials that can't absorb gunfire may lead to injuries and death. For more temporary or cost-effective needs, plywood or a plastic sheet can make a suitable wall.

In addition to the actual facility, the shoot house also requires targets to simulate the individuals they must subdue. The most common and recognizable targets used in shoot houses are paper silhouettes and mannequins. To simulate the movement of an actual person the targets are either placed on rails or they can pop up from an undisclosed location.

=== Virtual kill house ===
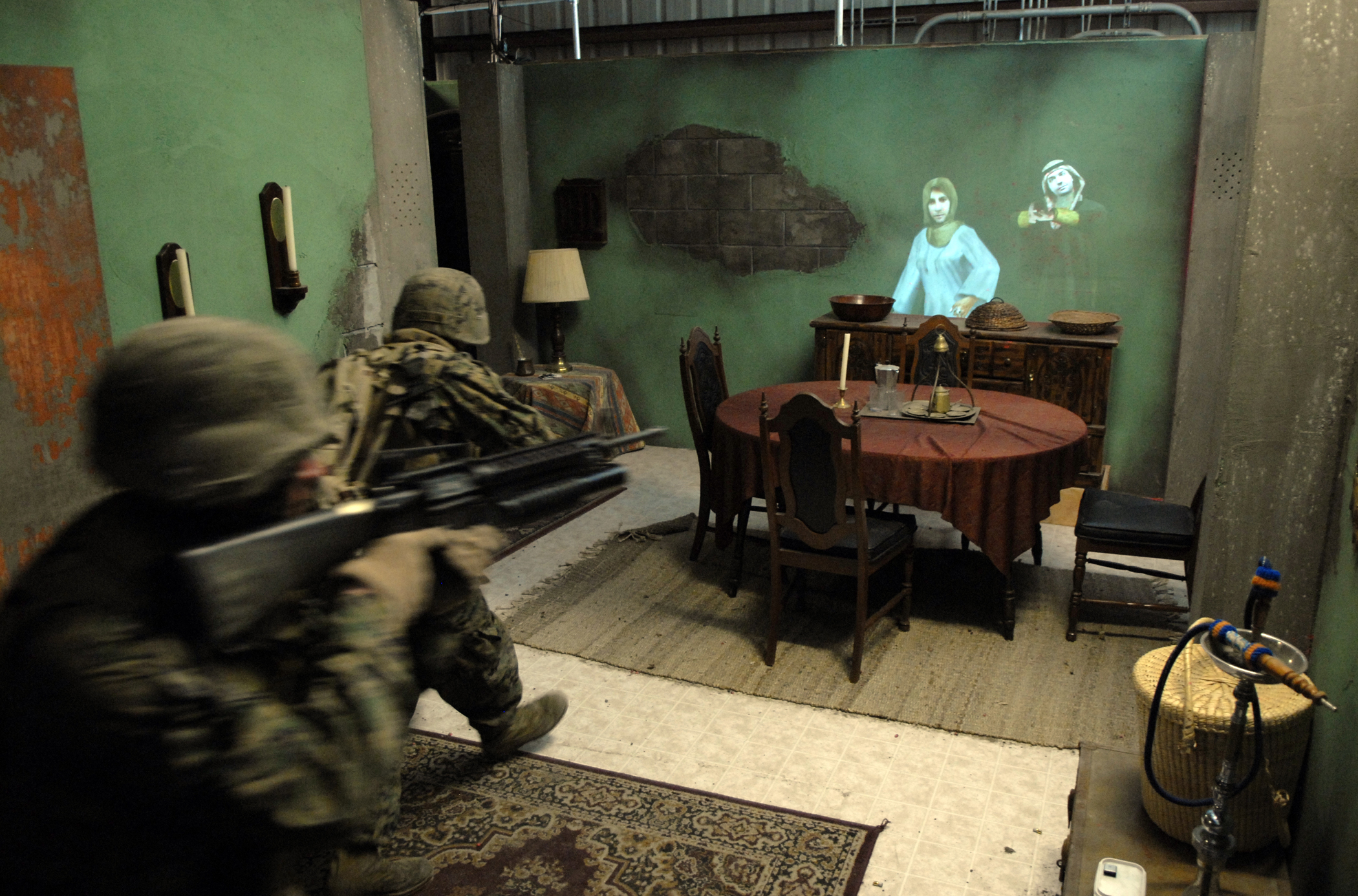
US Marines clearing a room in a virtual shoot house at Camp Pendleton, California, 2008.

An alternative to the more traditional shoot house is a virtual kill house. Virtual kill houses make use of audio and visual technology to create an interactive, if not video game like, experience. This version of a kill house uses a projector to display different scenarios on a screen while sensors keep track of the soldier's relative position and if he/she has hit the target on the screen.

Virtual kill houses provide a similar experience to a traditional shoot house, but are more interactive. In a normal shoot house, soldiers would shoot at silhouettes or mannequins, but in the virtual counterpart the targets are life-sized and free to move along the screen. These shoot houses usually only require a flat surface to display the scenarios, so wax ammunition is used in place of actual bullets. Live ammunition can also be used in projector training rooms with the use of white or light colored gum rubber as the screen. Behind the screen would be AR500 steel or a similar hard stop.

One notable virtual kill house is the Army Live Fire Virtual Targeting system used at Fort Bragg. Previously, the software used for the facility was part of America's Army, an online recruitment tool, which has been adapted for use in real training exercises.

== Safety ==
To avoid unwanted discharges and accidents, there is a set of guidelines, known as the cardinal rules, used to ensure a safe shoot house session.

These cardinal rules are:

1. Treat every firearm as if it is loaded.
2. Keep your firearm pointed away from other people.
3. Keep your finger out and away from the trigger.
4. Be aware of not just your target but everything beyond it.

In addition to the cardinal rules other guidelines include:

- The mandatory use of ear and eye protection.
- The mandatory use of body armor.
- Targets should be placed around the room so rounds hit the impact areas.
- There should be no one in the shoot house before the training exercise.
- Equipment (guns, ammunition, targets, and the shoot house) should all be authorized and inspected before the training exercise.

== Public use ==
In addition to military and police use, kill houses, like shooting ranges, are available for public use. Companies such as 360 Ballistics (Amidon Ballistic Concrete), Meggitt Training Systems and Pareti Mobile Walls offer to build permanent or portable shoot houses for the public. There is also a community of enthusiasts that build and use kill houses for their own purposes and entertainment. Kill houses though are still a training tool first and foremost.

== See also ==
- List of established military terms
