= Emergency war plan =

Emergency war plan may refer to the following:

- Military operation planning
- Emergency management practices in the case of war

Examples include:

- United States war plans (1945–1950) were developed for the contingency of a war with the Soviet Union
