= United States war plans =

United States war plans may refer to:

- United States color-coded war plans, potential U.S. strategies for a variety of hypothetical war scenarios developed during the 1920s and 1930s
- United States war plans (1945–1950)
