= Killing House =

British military training facility

Coordinates: 52.08397°N 2.79571°W

The Killing House, a shoot house, is the Special Air Service's prime training facility for hostage rescue operations. The point of the Killing House is to train the SAS operatives to enter a room and be able to assess the situation and shoot any threats. The Counter-Terrorism team of SAS uses it for close-quarters battle (CQB) training.

The Killing House is located at the Stirling Lines barracks, near Hereford. It is a two storey building with four rooms on each level. It is designed just like a conventional building, with furniture, pictures, toilets, etc. The building has special rubber-coated walls to absorb bullets, extractor fans to clear out fumes, and video cameras in corners to record the action in the rooms. Each room has at least one metal target. The idea of the Killing House has been adopted by other elite units, including America's Delta Force, the FBI, Israeli special forces, FSK (of Norway).

== Training the royal family ==
The SAS also use the Killing House as part of the training members of the British royal family receive for hostage situations. Each royal and their partner is provided with black overalls, marked with "his" and "hers", where they then play the role of "hostages" and are put in a room in the Killing House surrounded by targets of cutout "terrorists" while the SAS conduct a live fire exercise to rescue them. The purpose of this training is so that, should they ever be taken hostage, the royals know how to react to such a rescue and do not endanger themselves. The training also includes recognising potential threats, defensive driving, and how to interact with kidnappers. King Charles III and his then wife Diana, Princess of Wales, attended this training in 1983. Prior to the exercise he signed a humorous letter that remains on the wall at Stirling Lines:

“Should this demonstration go wrong I, the undersigned Prince of Wales, will not commit B Squadron 22 Special Air Service Regiment to the Tower of London. Charles.”

In the subsequent exercise a flash-bang set fire to Princess Diana's hair, with her lady in waiting having to trim it back into shape prior to them leaving due to the secrecy of the exercise. Other royals believed to have attended this training include Prince William, Prince Harry, and their wives Catherine and Meghan, as well as the late Queen Elizabeth II.
