= Basic Encyclopedia =

US Air Force list of potential targets

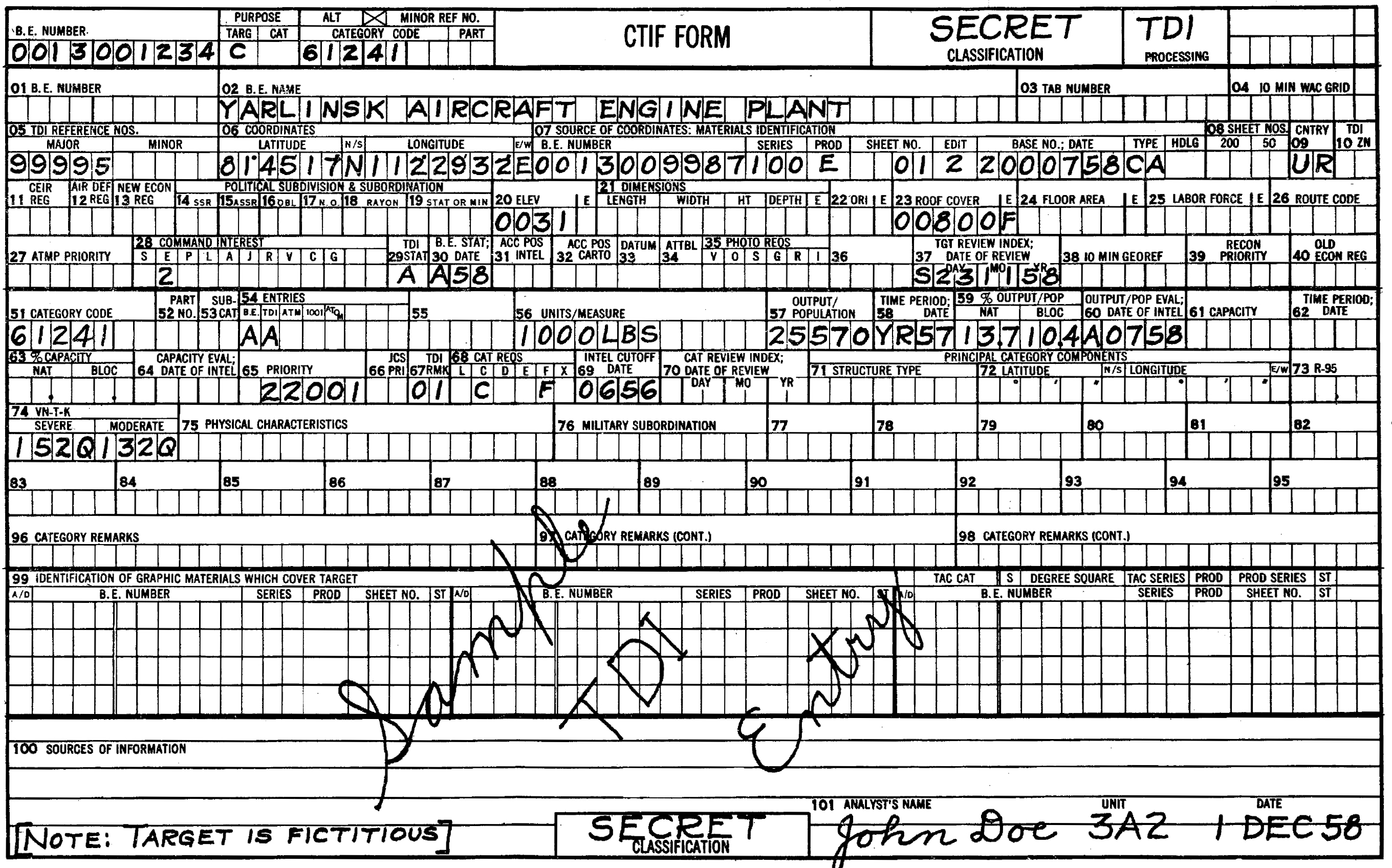
An example (with a fictitious target) of a Consolidated Target Intelligence File (CTIF) form with an example of a (fictitious) Bombing Encyclopedia target data (including the "B.E." number), from 1958.

The Basic Encyclopedia is an encyclopedia of the US Air Force that lists places that are targets for bombing. It was begun in 1946 during the Cold War as the Bombing Encyclopedia and included over 80,000 potential targets around the world during the Cold War. It included their B.E. number (which consisted of an eight digit identifier), a brief description, longitude and latitude, elevation, and category (military, industrial, or an airfield). The title was changed to Basic Encyclopedia in the 1960s or 1970s before its publication ended in 1973. The encyclopedia was computerized and used in the Defense Intelligence Agency's Automated Installation File.

== See also ==
- Operation Dropshot
