= Zbiroh =

- Town
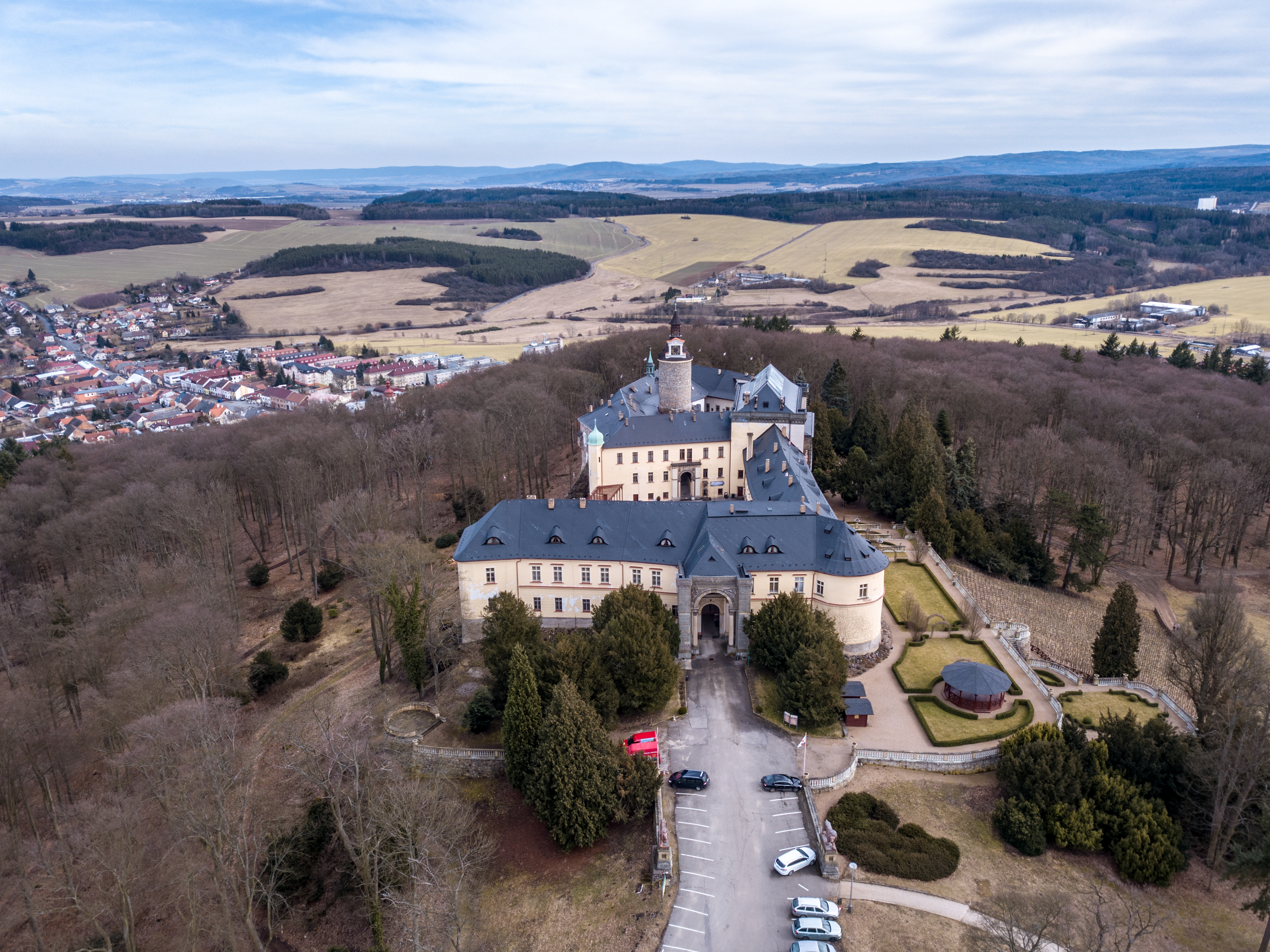
- Zbiroh Castle with the town

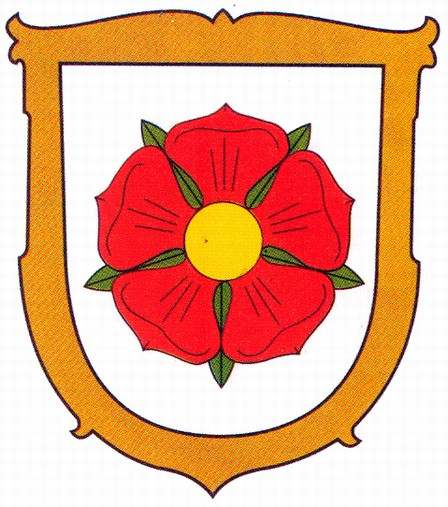
- Flag Coat of arms

- Location in the Czech Republic
- Coordinates: 49°51′37″N 13°46′22″E
- Country: Czech Republic
- Region: Plzeň
- District: Rokycany
- First mentioned: 1230

Government
  - Mayor: Josef Štícha

Area
  - Total: 31.94 km^{2} (12.33 sq mi)
- Elevation: 414 m (1,358 ft)

Population (2026-01-01)
  - Total: 2,500
  - Density: 78/km^{2} (200/sq mi)
- Time zone: UTC+1 (CET)
  - Summer (DST): UTC+2 (CEST)
- Postal code: 338 08
- Website: www.zbiroh.cz

Zbiroh (Czech pronunciation: [ˈzbɪrox]) is a town in Rokycany District in the Plzeň Region of the Czech Republic. It has about 2,500 inhabitants.

== Administrative division ==
Zbiroh consists of five municipal parts (in brackets population according to the 2021 census):

- Zbiroh (2,301)
- Chotětín (15)
- Jablečno (29)
- Přísednice (43)
- Třebnuška (32)

== Etymology ==
The initial name of the town was Zbirov. The name was derived either from the Czech verb zbíti ('beat up') or zbýti ('remain') and probably originated as a mocking nickname. From the 14th century, the names Zbirov and Zbiroh were used alternately, and it was only in 1913 that the name settled into its current form.

== Geography ==
Zbiroh is located about 18 kilometres (11 mi) northeast of Rokycany and 30 km (19 mi) northeast of Plzeň. It lies in the Křivoklát Highlands. The highest point is the hill Kohoutov at 596 m (1,955 ft) above sea level. The stream Zbirožský potok flows through the town.

=== Climate ===
Zbiroh's climate is classified as humid continental climate (Köppen: Dfb; Trewartha: Dcbo). Among them, the annual average temperature is 8.5 °C (47.3 °F), the hottest month in July is 18.4 °C (65.1 °F), and the coldest month is −0.9 °C (30.4 °F) in January. The annual precipitation is 585.7 millimetres (23.06 in), of which June is the wettest with 83.7 millimetres (3.30 in), while February is the driest with only 26.6 millimetres (1.05 in). The extreme temperature throughout the year ranged from −25.0 °C (−13.0 °F) on 22 December 1969 to 38.6 °C (101.5 °F) on 27 July 1983.

Climate data for Zbiroh, 1991–2020 normals, extremes 1964–present
Month	Jan	Feb	Mar	Apr	May	Jun	Jul	Aug	Sep	Oct	Nov	Dec	Year
Record high °C (°F)	16.8 (62.2)	18.7 (65.7)	23.2 (73.8)	29.2 (84.6)	32.4 (90.3)	36.2 (97.2)	38.6 (101.5)	37.2 (99.0)	32.8 (91.0)	27.0 (80.6)	21.0 (69.8)	16.5 (61.7)	38.6 (101.5)
Mean daily maximum °C (°F)	1.9 (35.4)	3.9 (39.0)	8.5 (47.3)	14.6 (58.3)	19.4 (66.9)	22.7 (72.9)	24.9 (76.8)	24.9 (76.8)	19.4 (66.9)	13.1 (55.6)	6.4 (43.5)	2.5 (36.5)	13.5 (56.3)
Daily mean °C (°F)	−0.9 (30.4)	0.0 (32.0)	3.6 (38.5)	8.6 (47.5)	13.1 (55.6)	16.6 (61.9)	18.4 (65.1)	18.0 (64.4)	13.1 (55.6)	8.2 (46.8)	3.3 (37.9)	-0.0 (32.0)	8.5 (47.3)
Mean daily minimum °C (°F)	−3.6 (25.5)	−3.2 (26.2)	−0.3 (31.5)	3.1 (37.6)	7.2 (45.0)	10.8 (51.4)	12.6 (54.7)	12.3 (54.1)	8.5 (47.3)	4.6 (40.3)	0.7 (33.3)	−2.4 (27.7)	4.2 (39.6)
Record low °C (°F)	−23.8 (−10.8)	−23.8 (−10.8)	−19.6 (−3.3)	−9.0 (15.8)	−3.6 (25.5)	−1.3 (29.7)	2.9 (37.2)	2.5 (36.5)	−2.1 (28.2)	−8.3 (17.1)	−15.2 (4.6)	−25.0 (−13.0)	−25.0 (−13.0)
Average precipitation mm (inches)	30.0 (1.18)	26.6 (1.05)	36.2 (1.43)	34.5 (1.36)	64.9 (2.56)	83.7 (3.30)	81.6 (3.21)	74.1 (2.92)	44.7 (1.76)	41.5 (1.63)	34.9 (1.37)	33.1 (1.30)	585.7 (23.06)
Average snowfall cm (inches)	17.5 (6.9)	15.3 (6.0)	9.2 (3.6)	1.6 (0.6)	0.0 (0.0)	0.0 (0.0)	0.0 (0.0)	0.0 (0.0)	0.0 (0.0)	0.5 (0.2)	7.2 (2.8)	12.6 (5.0)	63.8 (25.1)
Average relative humidity (%)	85.2	80.0	75.7	69.1	70.6	70.8	69.5	70.3	77.0	83.1	87.9	87.2	77.2
Source: Czech Hydrometeorological Institute

== History ==
The first written mention of Zbiroh is from 1230. It was a market village which was promoted to a market town in 1369. During the rule of the Rosenberg family, Zbiroh developed and acquired various rights. In 1897, Zbiroh was promoted to a town by Franz Joseph I.

The first kill house in Czechoslovakia was built in 1947 in a police school in Zbiroh by World War II veterans of the Czechoslovak Army that had been trained in Great Britain.

== Demographics ==
Historical population

Year	Pop.	±%
1869	2,577	—
1880	2,484	−3.6%
1890	2,317	−6.7%
1900	2,212	−4.5%
1910	2,236	+1.1%

Year	Pop.	±%
1921	2,082	−6.9%
1930	1,999	−4.0%
1950	1,852	−7.4%
1961	2,220	+19.9%
1970	2,053	−7.5%

Year	Pop.	±%
1980	2,560	+24.7%
1991	2,437	−4.8%
2001	2,593	+6.4%
2011	2,567	−1.0%
2021	2,420	−5.7%

Source: Censuses

== Transport ==
There are no railways or major roads passing through the municipality. The D5 motorway from Prague to Plzeň runs south of the town just outside the municipal territory.

== Sights ==
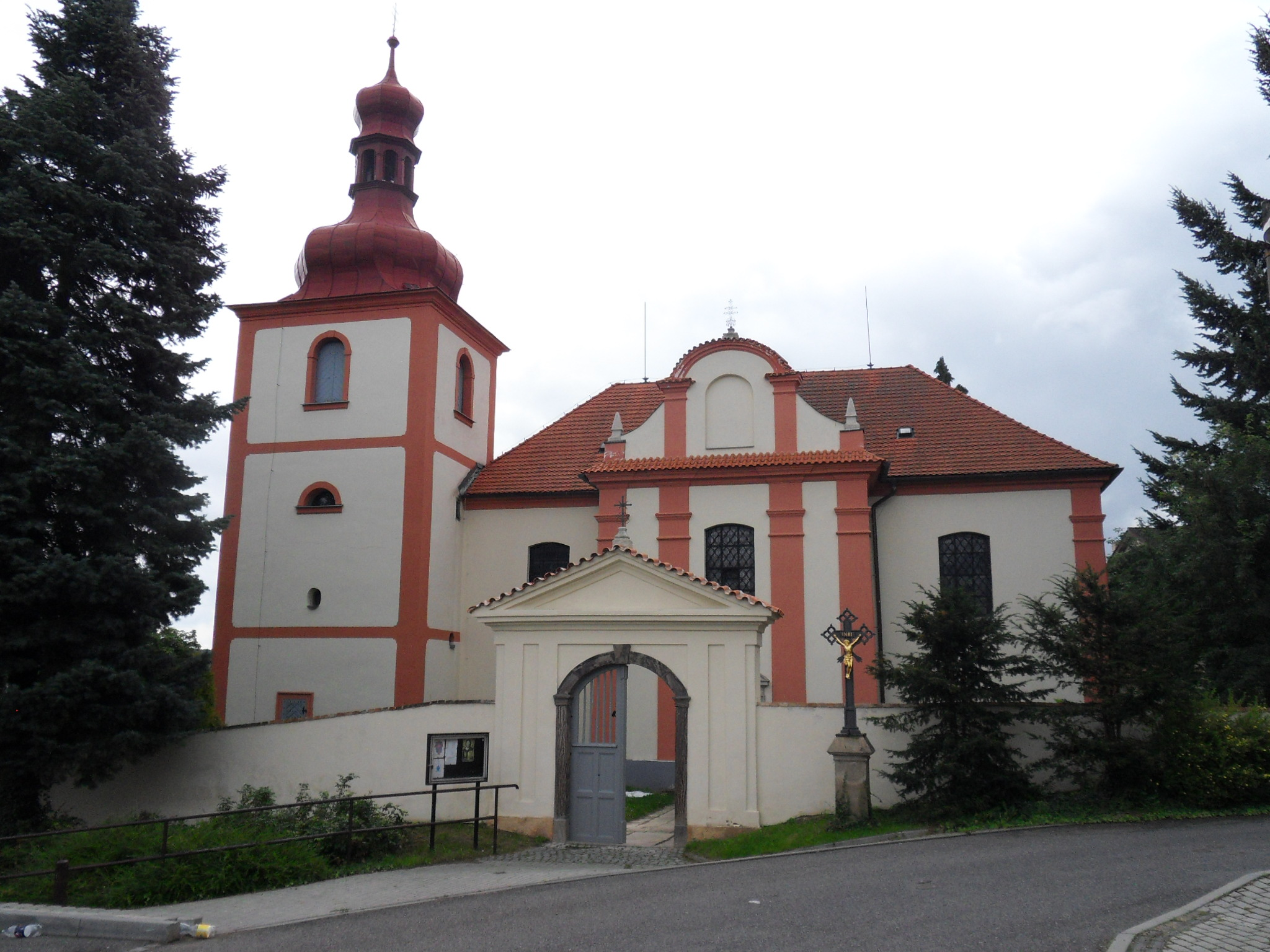
Church of Saint Nicholas

The most important monument is the Zbiroh Castle. The original Romanesque-Gothic castle was built at the end of the 12th century or in the early 13th century, and belongs to the oldest aristocratic residences in the country. At the end of the 16th century, it was rebuilt into its current appearance of a large Renaissance castle. The main landmark of the original castle part is the oldest detached watch tower in the Czech Republic. The well located in Zbiroh Castle, 163 m (535 ft) deep, is one of the deepest castle wells in Europe.

The Church of Saint Nicholas was originally a Gothic building, rebuilt in the Baroque style in 1719–1720.

== Notable people ==
- Josef Václav Sládek (1845–1912), poet
