= Plan Totality =

1945 U.S. disinformation operation

Plan Totality was a disinformation ploy established by US General Dwight D. Eisenhower in August 1945 by order of US President Harry S. Truman after the Potsdam Conference.

The plan was for a nuclear attack on the USSR with 20 to 30 atomic bombs. It named 20 Soviet cities for obliteration by a nuclear first strike: Moscow, Gorky, Kuybyshev, Sverdlovsk, Novosibirsk, Omsk, Saratov, Kazan, Leningrad, Baku, Tashkent, Chelyabinsk, Nizhny Tagil, Magnitogorsk, Molotov, Tbilisi, Stalinsk, Grozny, Irkutsk, and Yaroslavl. However, this plan was actually a disinformation ploy. After the two atomic bombings of Japan during August of 1945, the United States government did not have any nuclear weapons ready for use. It had depleted all its fissile uranium in the bombs dropped on Hiroshima and Nagasaki and a large amount of its plutonium. There was enough plutonium to build one more atomic bomb in August of 1945. They were expecting it to take until sometime in October to get six more bombs built. By 1946, the United States still had only nine atomic bombs in its inventory, along with twenty-seven B-29 bombers capable of delivering them. Plan Totality was part of Truman's "giant atomic bluff" intended primarily to misinform the government of the USSR.

== See also ==
- Operation Dropshot
- Operation Unthinkable
- Truman Doctrine
- Seven Days to the River Rhine
- Feint
- 509th Composite Group
- Fat Man (Post-war development)
- Little Boy (Post-war development)
- Mark 4 nuclear bomb
- SAC (Establishment and Transfer to USAF)
- RDS-1
