= Czechoslovak Army in the West =

Czechoslovak Army in the West refers to Czechoslovak military units that served with the Western Allies during the Second World War:

- Czechoslovak 11th Infantry Battalion
- 1st Czechoslovak Armoured Brigade (1943–1945)
- Non-British personnel in the RAF during the Battle of Britain#Czechoslovakia
- List of Royal Air Force aircraft squadrons#Czechoslovak (310–313):
  - No. 310 Squadron RAF
  - No. 311 Squadron RAF
  - No. 312 (Czechoslovak) Squadron RAF
  - No. 313 Squadron RAF
