= Operation Unthinkable =

1945 plan for war between Western Allies and Soviet Union

Operation Unthinkable was the name given to two related possible future war plans developed by the British Chiefs of Staff Committee against the Soviet Union in 1945. The plans were never implemented. The creation of the plans was ordered by British Prime Minister Winston Churchill in May 1945 and developed by the British Armed Forces' Joint Planning Staff in May 1945 at the end of World War II in Europe.

One plan assumed a surprise attack on the Soviet forces stationed in Germany to impose "the will of the United States and British Empire upon Russia". "The will" was qualified as "a square deal for Poland", but added that "that does not necessarily limit the military commitment". The assessment, signed by the Chief of Army Staff on 9 June 1945, concluded: "It would be beyond our power to win a quick but limited success and we would be committed to a protracted war against heavy odds". The same code name was thereafter reused instead for a second, marginally-related plan, a hypothetical defensive scenario by which the British were to defend against a Soviet drive towards the North Sea and the Atlantic Ocean after the withdrawal of the American forces from the Continent.

The study became the first Cold War-era contingency plan for war against the USSR. Both plans were top secret and were not made public until 1998, although Soviet spy Guy Burgess had passed on details to Soviet intelligence at the time.

== Operations ==
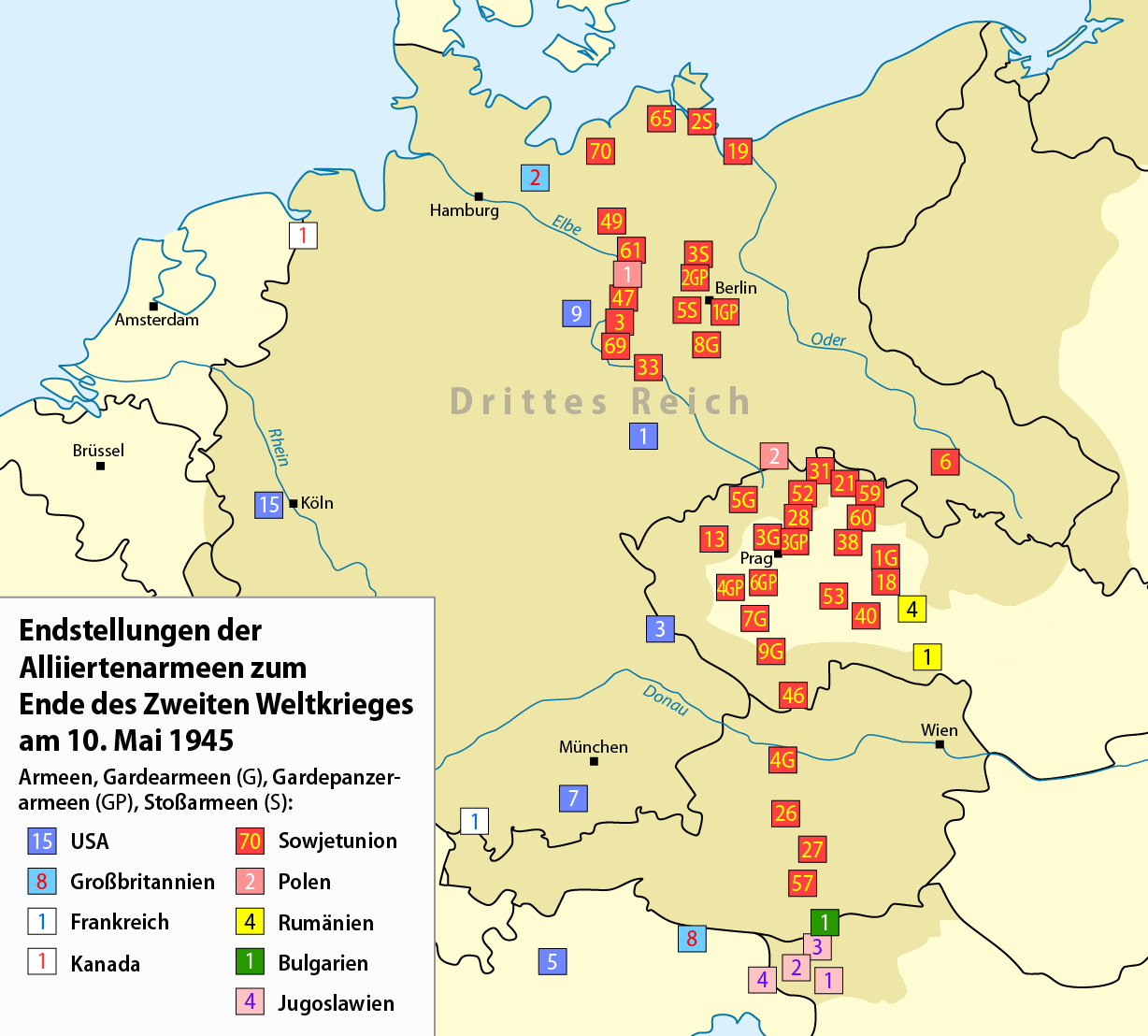
Positions of the Allied armies on 10 May 1945

=== Offensive ===
The initial primary goal of the operation was declared as "to impose upon Russia the will of the United States and the British Empire. Even though 'the will' of these two countries may be defined as no more than a square deal for Poland, that does not necessarily limit the military commitment". (The Soviet Union is referred to as Russia throughout the document, a metonym that was common in the West throughout the Cold War.)

The chiefs of staff were concerned that both the enormous size of the Soviet forces deployed in Europe at the end of the war and the perception that Soviet Premier Joseph Stalin was unreliable caused a Soviet threat to exist in Allied-held Western Europe. The USSR had yet to launch its attack on Japanese forces and so one of the assumptions in the report was that the Soviets would instead ally with Japan if the Western Allies commenced hostilities.

The hypothetical date for the start of the Allied invasion of Soviet-held Eastern Europe was scheduled for 1 July 1945, four days before the United Kingdom general election. The plan assumed a surprise attack by as many as 47 British and American divisions in the area of Dresden, in the middle of Soviet lines. That represented almost half of the approximately 100 divisions available to the British, American and Canadian headquarters at that time.

The plan was considered by the British Chiefs of Staff Committee as militarily unfeasible due to an anticipated 2.5:1 superiority in divisions of Soviet ground forces within Europe and the Middle East by 1 July, when the conflict was projected to occur. Most of the offensive operation would have been performed by American and British forces, as well as Polish forces and as many as 10 divisions of the German Army, remobilised from Disarmed Enemy Forces status. Any quick success would be caused by surprise alone. If a quick success could not be obtained before the beginning of winter, the assessment was that the Allies would be committed to a protracted total war. In the report of 22 May 1945, an offensive operation was deemed "hazardous".

The following table is based on Allied estimates at the time of the planning of Operation Unthinkable.

Projected balance in Western Europe by Allied estimates, 1 July 1945
	Western	Soviet	Ratio
Infantry divisions (Note: Division-Equivalents for the Soviets)	80	228	1 : 2.85
Armored divisions (Note: Division-Equivalents for the Soviets)	23	36	1 : 1.57
Tactical aircraft	6,048 (Note: Including 3,480 US, 2,370 Commonwealth, and 198 Polish.)	11,802	1 : 1.95
Strategic aircraft	2,750 (Note: Including 1,008 US, 1,722 Commonwealth, and 20 Polish.)	960	2.86 : 1

=== Defensive ===
In response to an instruction by Churchill of 10 June 1945, a follow-up report was written on "what measures would be required to ensure the security of the British Isles in the event of war with Russia in the near future". American forces were relocating to the Pacific region for a planned invasion of Japan, and Churchill was concerned that the reduction of forces would give the Soviets a strong advantage for offensive action in Western Europe. The report concluded that if the United States engaged solely in the Pacific Theatre, Britain's odds "would become fanciful".

The Joint Planning Staff rejected Churchill's notion of retaining bridgeheads on the Continent as not having any operational advantage. It was envisaged that Britain would use its air force and navy to resist, but a threat from mass rocket attack was anticipated, with no means of resistance except for strategic bombing.

== Subsequent discussions ==
By 1946, tensions were developing between the Allied-occupied and the Soviet-occupied areas of Europe and were considered as resulting potentially in conflict. One such area was the Julian March (an area of Southeastern Europe that is now divided among Croatia, Slovenia and Italy), and on 30 August 1946, informal discussions occurred between the British and the American chiefs of staff concerning how such a conflict could develop and the best strategy for conducting a European war. Again, the issue of retaining a bridgehead on the continent was discussed, with Dwight D. Eisenhower preferring a withdrawal to the Low Countries, rather than to Italy, because of their proximity to the United Kingdom.

== See also ==
- Operation Dropshot
- Operation Pike
- Operation Downfall
- Plan Totality
- Seven Days to the River Rhine
- Soviet offensive plans controversy
- Battle of Castle Itter, an actual operation that involved German troops fighting alongside Americans, though in this case it was against other German forces.

== Bibliography ==
- Costigliola, Frank (2011). Roosevelt's Lost Alliances: How Personal Politics Helped Start the Cold War. Princeton University Press. p. 544. ISBN 9780691121291.
- Hines, Sam. Operation Unthinkable. Its significance in the development of the Cold War (GRIN Verlag, 2016).
- Gibbons, Joel Clarke (2009). The Empire Strikes a Match in a World Full of Oil. Bloomington, IN: Xlibris Corporation. p. 352. ISBN 9781450008693.
- Lownie, Andrew (2016). Stalin's Englishman: The Lives of Guy Burgess. London: Hodder and Stoughton. ISBN 978-1-473-62738-3.
- Norton-Taylor, Richard (2 October 1998) "Churchill plotted invasion of Russia" The Guardian
- Reynolds, David (2006). From World War to Cold War: Churchill, Roosevelt, and the International History of the 1940s. Oxford: Oxford University Press. p. 376. ISBN 978-0-19-928411-5.
- Ruane, Kevin (2016) Churchill and the Bomb in War and Cold War London: Bloomsbury Academic
- Walker, Jonathan (2013). Operation Unthinkable: The Third World War. The History Press. p. 192. ISBN 9780752487182.
- "Public Record Office, CAB 120/691/109040 "Operation Unthinkable: 'Russia: Threat to Western Civilization,'" British War Cabinet, Joint Planning Staff [Draft and Final Reports: 22 May, 8 June, and 11 July 1945]". 11 August 1945. Archived from the original (online photocopy) on 16 November 2010 – via Department of History, Northeastern University.
