= Seven Days to the River Rhine =

Soviet military simulation exercise

- Part of the Cold War
- A 1976 American map of probable axes of attack for the Warsaw Pact forces into Western Europe
- Location: Central Europe
- Planned: Would be carried out in response to a NATO first strike on Poland.
- Objective: German unification under East Germany; Occupation of Austria, Denmark, Luxembourg, Belgium, and the Netherlands east of River Rhine to the Warsaw Pact (if attempted)
- Date: Plan conceived 1979; available for execution until 1986
- Executed by: Warsaw Pact: Soviet Union; GSFG; Soviet Army Central Group of Forces; Soviet Army Northern Group of Forces; Soviet Army Southern Group of Forces; Bulgaria; Czechoslovakia; East Germany; Hungary; Poland; Communist Parties in prospective Soviet Satellites: (West Germany) / (East Germany) DKP (Expected to become the West German section of the SED); / (East Germany) SEW (Expected to become the West Berlin section of the SED); (Austria) KPÖ; (Belgium) KPB/PCB; (Denmark) DKP; (Luxembourg) KPL; (Netherlands) CPN; Communist Parties in prospective Soviet Satellites (9-day extended plan to Lyon): (France) PCF
- Outcome: Never attempted Signing of the SALT II treaty. If attempted, intended to be a Warsaw Pact victory but with heavy cost of lives
- Casualties: ~2 million immediate Polish deaths near the Vistula

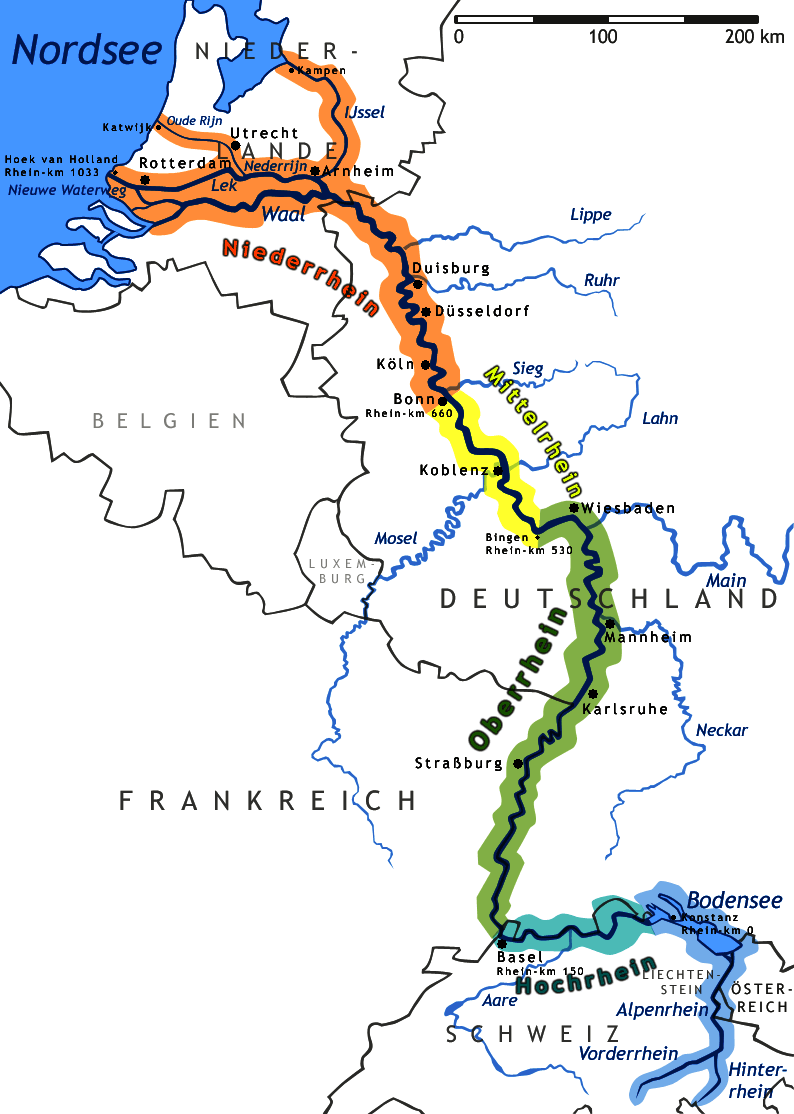
The Rhine is one of the most important rivers in Europe.

Seven Days to the River Rhine (Russian: «Семь дней до реки Рейн», romanized: "Sem' dney do reki Reyn") was a top-secret military simulation exercise developed in 1979 by the Warsaw Pact, as part of a series of Warsaw Pact war plans in Europe which were made at least since 1964. It depicted the Soviet Bloc's vision of a seven-day nuclear war between NATO and Warsaw Pact forces.

== Declassification ==
This possible World War III scenario was released by Polish Defense Minister Radosław Sikorski following the Law and Justice Party's victories in the 2005 Polish elections along with thousands of Warsaw Pact documents, in order to "break from the country's Communist past", and "educate the Polish public about the old regime." Sikorski stated that documents associated with the former regime would be declassified and published through the Institute of National Remembrance in the coming year.

The files released included documents about "Operation Danube", the 1968 Warsaw Pact invasion of Czechoslovakia in response to the Prague Spring. They included files on the 1970 Polish protests, and from the martial law era of the 1980s.

The Czech Republic and Hungary had declassified related documents in the 1990s. The Polish government declassified some material in this period.

== Battle outline ==
The scenario for the war was NATO launching a nuclear attack on Polish and Czechoslovak cities in the Vistula river valley area in a first-strike scenario, which would prevent Warsaw Pact commanders from sending reinforcements to East Germany to forestall a possible NATO invasion of that country. The plan expected that as many as two million Polish civilians would die in such a war, and Polish operational strength would be completely destroyed.

A Soviet nuclear counter-strike would be launched against West Germany, Belgium, the Netherlands, Denmark and northeast Italy.

== Nuclear response ==
Maps associated with the released plan show nuclear strikes in many NATO states, but exclude both France and the United Kingdom. There are several possibilities for this lack of strikes, the most probable being that both France and the United Kingdom are nuclear weapons states, and as such retain nuclear arsenals that could be employed in retaliation for nuclear strikes against their nations.

The French Force de dissuasion employed a nuclear strategy, known as dissuasion du faible au fort (weak-to-strong deterrence). This is considered a "counter-value" strategy, which implies that a nuclear attack on France would be responded to by a strike on Soviet-bloc cities.

The Guardian assumed that "France would have escaped attack, possibly because it is not a member of NATO's integrated structure. Britain, which has always been at the heart of NATO, would also have been spared, suggesting Moscow wanted to stop at the Rhine to avoid overstretching its forces."

In 1966, President Charles de Gaulle withdrew France from NATO's integrated military command structure. In practical terms, while France remained a NATO member and fully participated in the political instances of the Organization, it was no longer represented on certain committees like the Nuclear Planning Group and the Defence Planning Committee. Foreign forces were removed from French territory and French forces temporarily withdrew from NATO commands.

The 1st French Army, with its headquarters at Strasbourg, on the Franco-German border, was the main field headquarters controlling operations in support of NATO in West Germany, as well as defending France. Although France had withdrawn from the NATO Military Command Structure in 1966, there was a documented understanding, formalised by regular joint exercises in West Germany, that France would go to the aid of NATO, should the Warsaw Pact attack. To that end, the Headquarters and two divisions of II (Fr) Corps were permanently stationed in West Germany, with the wartime mission of supporting NATO's US-led Central Army Group (CENTAG).

There were many high-value targets in Britain, like RAF Fylingdales, RAF Mildenhall, and RAF Lakenheath, that would have to be struck in a conventional manner in this plan, though a nuclear strike would be far more effective, and, as the plans show, a preferable option for the Soviet leadership as shown by their strikes in Western Europe. The plan indicates that USAF fighter-bombers, primarily the long-ranged F-111 Aardvark, would be employed in nuclear strikes, and that they would be launched from those British bases.

The Soviets planned to use about 7.5 megatons of atomic weaponry during such a conflict.

=== Known targets ===
The Austrian capital Vienna was to be hit by two 500-kiloton bombs. In Italy, Vicenza, Verona, Padua, and several military bases were to be hit by single 500-kiloton bombs. The Hungarian People's Army was to capture Vienna.

Stuttgart, Munich, and Nuremberg in West Germany were to be destroyed by nuclear weapons, and then captured by the Czechoslovaks and Hungarians.

In Denmark, the first nuclear targets were Roskilde and Esbjerg. Roskilde, while having no military significance, is the second-largest city on Zealand and located close to the Danish capital Copenhagen. The distance from central Copenhagen to Roskilde is only 35 km or 22 mi. It would also be targeted for its cultural and historical significance, to break the morale of the Danish population and army. Esbjerg, the fifth-largest city in Denmark, would be targeted for its large harbour capable of facilitating delivery of large NATO reinforcements. If there was Danish resistance after the two initial strikes, other targets would be bombed.

== Additional plans ==
The Soviet Union planned to have reached Lyon by day nine, and to press on to a final position at the Pyrenees. Czechoslovakia thought the plan was too optimistic at the time, and some present-day Western planners believe that such a goal was unrealistic or even unattainable.

== See also ==
- Operation Unthinkable
- Fulda Gap
- Square Leg (UK operation)
- World War III
- National Redoubt (Switzerland)
- Ryszard Kukliński
- Red Storm Rising
