= Schlesinger Doctrine =

1974 alteration of U.S. nuclear strike policy

The "Schlesinger Doctrine" is the name, given by the press, to a major re-alignment of United States nuclear strike policy that was announced in January 1974 by the US Secretary of Defense, James Schlesinger. It outlined a broad selection of counterforce options against a wide variety of potential enemy actions, a major change from earlier SIOP policies of the Kennedy and Johnson eras that focused on Mutually Assured Destruction and typically included only one or two "all-out" plans of action that used the entire U.S. nuclear arsenal in a single strike. A key element of the new plans were a variety of limited strikes solely against enemy military targets while ensuring the survivability of the U.S. second-strike capability, which was intended to leave an opening for a negotiated settlement.

== Background ==
=== Wargasm ===
The first coordinated nuclear attack policy in the United States was codified as SIOP-62 at the prompting of the Science Advisor in the Eisenhower Administration, George Kistiakowsky. Prior to SIOP-62, each of the U.S.'s military branches had drawn up their own target lists and action plans, which led to a wide variety of overkill situations and the possibility of blue-on-blue fire. After Kistiakowsky reported on the problems this caused, Eisenhower took nuclear planning away from the individual branches, centralized it, and gave it to RAND for extensive oversight.

However, the plan that developed was still based on the same basic concept of an all-out war, or what Herman Kahn referred to as a "wargasm". SIOP-62 called for a single coordinated attack that used up all of the U.S.'s arsenal on a wide variety of targets in the Soviet Union and China. Concerns about the inflexibility of the plan were expressed early and often; U.S. Marine Commandant David Shoup noted that an attack by the Soviets would result in a retaliation that included China whether or not they were involved, and observed that "any plan that kills millions of Chinese when it isn't even their war is not a good plan. This is not the American way."

=== Flexible response ===
In the late 1950s a number of parties pointed out another serious problem with the all-or-nothing approach. If the Soviets launched a limited attack against isolated U.S. military targets, they could cause significant damage to the U.S.'s own nuclear forces without causing serious civilian casualties. If such an attack was successful, the Soviets would still have the capability of launching a second strike against U.S. cities, while the U.S. would be so reduced in power that their only militarily effective response would be an attack on Soviet cities, knowing the Soviets would respond. This would leave the Soviets in an extremely advantageous position for a negotiated peace. SIOP-62 simply had no response to this threat.

The "solution" to this problem was developed under the Kennedy Administration, and consisted of responding to limited attacks in kind. In this case, if the same scenario were to develop, the Soviets would be placed in the extremely uncomfortable position of having to allow the U.S. counterattack to land and damage their own forces, or immediately launching as soon as the attack was discovered. Neither course of action would preserve any advantage, and so it was believed this policy would render the limited attack untenable. As early as 1962 Robert McNamara had proposed a flexible strategy starting with a number of limited counterforce strikes before proceeding to full-out exchanges. These plans, codified in SIOP-62, remained virtually unchanged for over a decade.

=== MAD ===
However, as nuclear forces moved from bombers to ICBMs with limited accuracy but high survivability, the ability to carry out a counterforce strike while the enemy forces were still on the ground became increasingly difficult. This difficulty further increased with every new iteration of missile, which continued to reduce reaction time to the point where catching them still in their silos would be extremely difficult. As these weapons were, at the time at least, relatively inaccurate, they were limited primarily to countervalue attacks on the enemy's cities, further eroding the idea of a limited attack against them being responded to in-kind.

As a result of these technical changes, the idea of flexible response ossified, while mutually assured destruction (MAD) became the primary strategic concept of the era. McNamara became a major proponent of MAD, and used it as a reason to cancel other nuclear delivery systems, like the B-1 Lancer bomber. In testimony before Congress he stated that "The strategic missile forces for 1967-71 will provide more force than is required for 'Assured Destruction' ... a new advanced strategic aircraft does not at this time appear justified."

With the rise of MAD, all of the earlier problems with the "wargasm" approach returned. Adding to the problems, the U.S. now had obligations under various treaties to protect allies using their nuclear arms, the so-called "nuclear umbrella". This meant that the Soviets could launch a limited attack against an ally, leaving the U.S. with the choice of backing down, or accepting a full-scale exchange.

In June 1969 Kissinger briefed Nixon on the problem of MAD, and Nixon later addressed the issue in Congress in February 1970, stating "Should a President, in the event of a nuclear attack, be left with the single option of ordering the mass destruction of enemy civilians, in the face of the certainty that it would be followed by the mass slaughter of Americans?" Kissinger and Nixon developed plans for a return to a flexible response strategy, but had to put these plans on hold until the Vietnam War ended.

== Schlesinger's reforms ==
Nominated by Richard Nixon on May 10, 1973, Schlesinger became Secretary of Defense on July 2. As a university professor, researcher at Rand, and government official in three agencies, he had acquired an impressive background in national security affairs.

Analyzing U.S. nuclear strategy, Schlesinger noted that the policies developed in the 1950s and 1960s were based on an overwhelming U.S. lead in nuclear forces. The plans focussed on doing as much damage to the USSR and its allies as possible, regardless of the actions the Soviets might take in response. Schlesinger stated that "deterrence is not a substitute for defense; defense capabilities, representing the potential for effective counteraction, are the essential condition of deterrence. He expressed grave doubts about the entire concept of mutually assured destruction (MAD).

Schlesinger felt that a credible deterrence would need to be based on several conditions; the U.S. would need to maintain some level of force parity with the USSR, the force would have to be highly survivable, and based on its survivability, there should be a wide range of plans that would not boil down to one of a number of different massive attacks. His new strategy was based on a number of limited counterforce attacks that would "limit the chances of uncontrolled escalation" and "hit meaningful targets" without causing widespread collateral damage. In most of these plans, majority of the U.S.'s nuclear force would be withheld in the hope that the enemy would not attack U.S. cities, while still inflicting serious military damage that might end any ongoing actions. He explicitly disavowed any intention to acquire a first-strike capability against the USSR.

Schlesinger described the new doctrine as having three main aspects:

1. The National Command Authority or its successors should have many choices about the use of weapons, always having an option to escalate.
2. Targeting should make it very explicit that the first requisite is selective retaliation against the enemy's military (i.e., tailored counterforce).
3. Some targets and target classes should not be struck, at least at first, to give the opponent a rational reason to terminate the conflict. Reduced collateral damage was another benefit of this "withhold" method. Nixon codified the basic concept as part of NSDM-242, which came into force as SIOP-5 in 1976.

In order to meet the needs of SIOP-5, a number of changes were made to the U.S. force structure. The B-1 bomber, recently cancelled, was brought back in order to provide a survivable strike option that could be launched as a show of U.S. intent. Additionally, Schlesinger put an emphasis on short range weapons that had clear counterforce capability, whose use would not signify an all-out countervalue attack. This led to further work on systems like the Pershing II and various basing arrangements in Europe that would not reach fruition until the 1980s.

== Controversy ==
The basic outline of the Schlesinger Doctrine remained in effect until the period of rapid disarmament in the 1980s, although it saw numerous modifications. Throughout this period it remained highly controversial for a variety of reasons.

The announcement of the Doctrine immediately caused problems during the SALT I negotiations. At the start of negotiations, the U.S. delegation had assured their Soviet counterparts that the U.S. was not seeking a counterforce ability, but the Schlesinger Doctrine clearly stated that they were. During the June 1974 summit, Leonid Brezhnev vehemently criticized the Doctrine as a threat to Soviet forces, whose parity was a key concept of the SALT negotiations. Schlesinger's concerns about the SALT process would eventually lead to his resignation in 1975.

Another concern was that while Schlesinger stated the U.S. would not invest in first-strike weapons, through the 1970s and 1980s a number of weapon systems were developed that would only be useful in a first strike scenario. The most obvious example was the AGM-86 ALCM cruise missile, a highly accurate weapon designed primarily to attack hardened military targets. Observers both in the USSR and elsewhere, noted that such a weapon was only really useful in a "sneak attack" scenario, which would allow it to attack ICBM sites and thereby so reduce the Soviets' own counterforce abilities as to render them impotent. In a mutually assured destruction scenario, those targets would have already been hit by ICBMs or SLBMs.
