= Single Integrated Operational Plan =

1961–2003 US nuclear strategy document

The Single Integrated Operational Plan (SIOP) was the United States' general plan for nuclear war from 1961 to 2003. The SIOP gave the president of the United States a range of targeting options, and described launch procedures and target sets against which nuclear weapons would be launched. The plan integrated the capabilities of the nuclear triad of strategic bombers, land-based intercontinental ballistic missiles (ICBMs), and sea-based submarine-launched ballistic missiles (SLBMs). The SIOP was a highly classified document, and was one of the most secret and sensitive issues in U.S. national security policy.

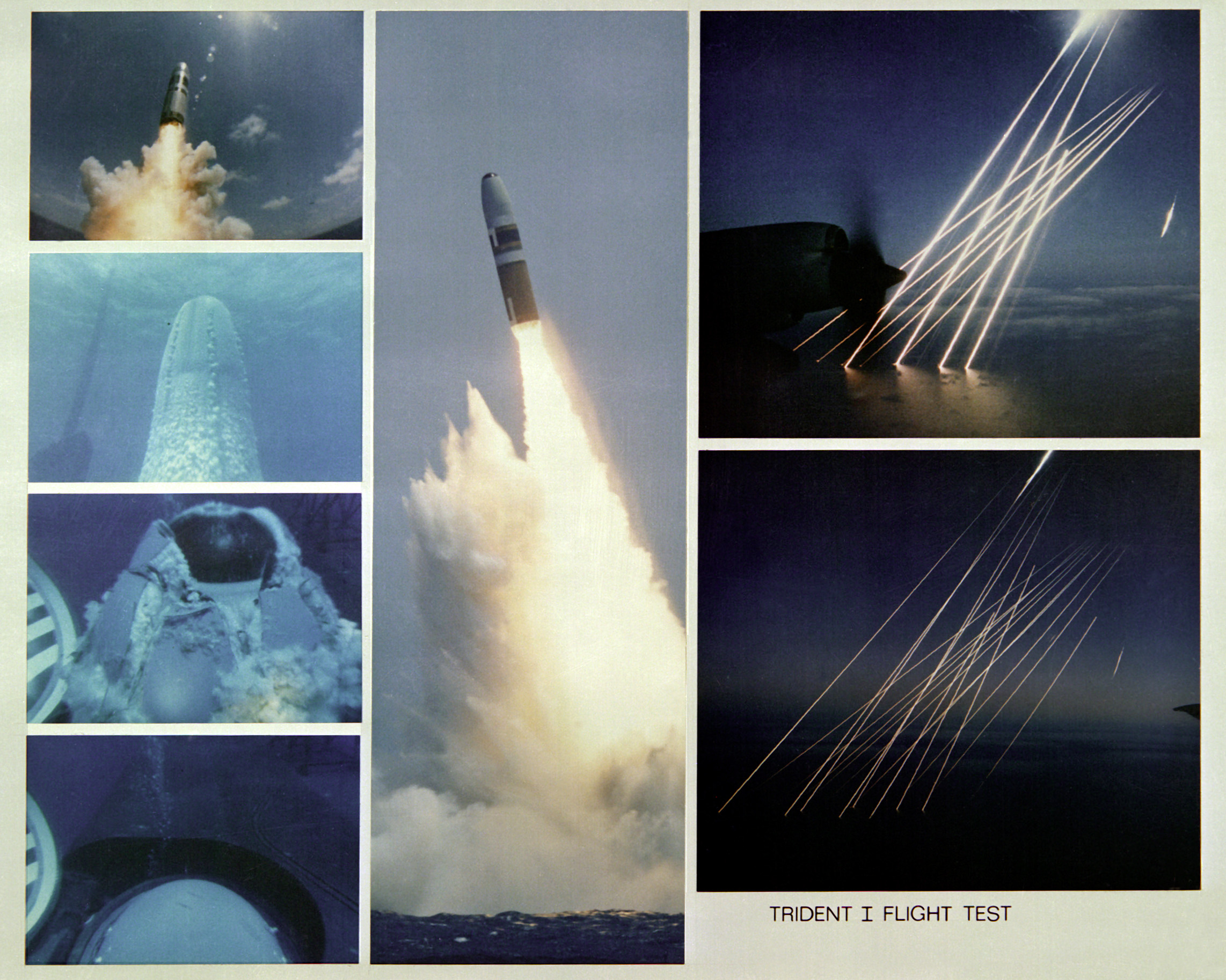
Montage of submerged submarine launch to the reentry of the multiple independently targetable reentry vehicles of a Trident missile

The first SIOP, titled SIOP-62, was finished on 14 December 1960 and implemented on 1 July 1961 (the start of fiscal year 1962). The SIOP was updated annually until February 2003, when it was replaced by Operations Plan (OPLAN) 8044. As of April 2013, the U.S. nuclear war plan was OPLAN 8010-12, Strategic Deterrence and Force Employment.

== Planning process ==
While much of the United States' nuclear war planning process remains classified, some information on the former SIOP planning process has been made public. The planning process began with the president issuing a presidential directive establishing the concepts, goal, and guidelines that provided guidance to the nuclear planners. The secretary of defense then used the president's guidance to produce the Nuclear Weapons Employment Policy (NUWEP) that specified basic planning assumptions, attack options, targeting objectives, types of targets, targeting constraints, and coordination with combatant commanders. The NUWEP was then used by the Joint Chiefs of Staff (JCS) to create the "Joint Strategic Capabilities Plan (JSCP), Annex C (Nuclear)." This document established a more detailed and elaborate set of goals and conditions that included targeting and damage criteria for the use of nuclear weapons. The final stage in the planning process occurred when the Strategic Air Command (SAC) (from 1961 to 1992) or the United States Strategic Command (USSTRATCOM) (from 1992 to 2003) took the guidance from the JSCP and created the actual nuclear war plan that becomes the SIOP. Detailed planning was carried out by the Joint Strategic Target Planning Staff (JSTPS) co-located with SAC Headquarters in Omaha, Nebraska.

As part of SIOP planning, Strategic Air Command (SAC, later USSTRATCOM) developed a set of plans and a series of options based on a target set known as the National Target Base (NTB). The number of targets in the NTB varied over time, from 16,000 in 1985 to 12,500 at the end of the Cold War in 1991, to 2,500 by 2001. The SIOP was primarily directed against targets in the Soviet Union (later Russia) but targets in the People's Republic of China, which had been part of the SIOP until the 1970s, were added back into the plan in 1997. In 1999, the NTB reportedly included targets in Russia, China, North Korea, Iran, Iraq, Syria, and Libya.

== History ==
SIOP, and its renamed successors, is most importantly an "integrated" plan that uses both Air Force and Navy delivery systems; it is "single" only in the sense that it comes out of one planning group. The "plan" actually contains multiple "attack options" that are themselves complex plans.

=== Early targeting after the Second World War ===
==== Truman ====
There is no evidence that the Soviet Union's contingency plans from the end of World War II to 1950 were anything but routine and defensive, and the substantial postwar demobilization of the Soviet military supports the view that the USSR did not view a new war in Europe as likely. Although Soviet doctrine incorporated an assumption of innate hostility of the capitalist powers to Communism, Soviet leader Josef Stalin apparently believed that neither the USSR nor the West could afford to fight another world war, and was skeptical of the Western ability to raise an army large enough to occupy Soviet territory. Soviet planning thus emphasized defenses against nuclear bombing, and attacks on Western European bomber bases. Plans in 1946 and 1948 assumed that during war with an unspecified enemy, Soviet forces in Germany would assume defensive positions within the Soviet occupation zone and wait for reinforcements before counterattacking.

Soviet conventional forces greatly outnumbered the West's, however, and United States strategic nuclear strike plans were developed accordingly. While the United States was the only nation with the atomic bomb, in 1946 it had only 17 Silverplate B-29 bombers and 11 atomic bombs. Many early American war plans were based on using hundreds of nonexisting weapons; for example, an autumn 1945 plan envisioned using 196 atomic bombs on Soviet industrial targets, but SAC could not deliver such quantities until 1952. The bombs were of the Mark 3 type, weighing five tons and requiring 39 men two days to assemble. The press reported that "atomic-capable" B-29s were deployed to Britain in mid-1948 during the Berlin Blockade, by which time the US possessed about 50 atomic weapons. The Soviets likely knew through espionage, however, that none of the aircraft was a Silverplate; rather, they would have been used as part of plan DOUBLEQUICK, involving World War II-like sustained conventional bombing raids on Soviet air bases in Eastern Europe. Other than increasing its anti-aircraft defenses, the Soviets did not change its military preparations in any way during the blockade, unlike the reaction in the West. Although the Soviets launched an intensive public relations effort in 1949, aided by sympathetic Western European fellow travelers, to oppose the formation of NATO, the new alliance's military strength was so weak that the Politburo did not bother to discuss it for six months after its formation.

Strategic bombing during World War II of key transportation and energy sites was more effective than attacking cities, and early postwar non-nuclear war plans envisioned focusing on the Soviet petroleum industry. US war planners lacked updated maps of the USSR, however, and had to use pre-World War II maps—some older than the Russian Revolution—or perhaps German aerial photos from the war. Due in part to the lack of updated intelligence, nuclear planning increasingly focused on urban areas, which were easier to target and offered the potential for "bonus damage". The early Plan Totality targeted 20 cities with the 30 nuclear bombs then available. Plan BROILER (November 1947) envisioned 34 bombs on 24 Soviet cities. It and later plans such as HALFMOON (May 1948; 50 bombs on 20 cities) and OFFTACKLE (December 1949; 104 urban targets, 220 bombs, 72 more reserved for follow-up attacks) envisioned Western forces in Europe slowly retreating while the United Kingdom was reinforced as an air base for atomic attacks on the Soviet Union. President Harry S. Truman hoped for an international ban on atomic weapons and believed that the American people would not support their use for "aggressive purposes", and ordered JCS to devise a plan for conventional war; however, Secretary of Defense James Forrestal in July 1948 ordered it to stop and resume atomic war planning due to the Berlin crisis.

Officials were pessimistic about the effectiveness of the atomic plans, however. Britain's December 1948 SPEEDWAY plan assumed that the Soviets would not have atomic weapons, but nonetheless forecast that the West could not "withstand a Russian advance in Western Europe, even with the full defence co-operation of the Western Powers", including 560 American and British atomic-capable bombers. The American TROJAN (December 1948) envisioned 133 bombs (although only 50 existed) hitting 70 cities. A committee led by General Hubert R. Harmon reported in May 1949 that even if all precisely hit their targets, the USSR would not surrender, its leadership would not be seriously weakened, and its military could still operate in Western Europe, the Middle East, and Asia. The attacks would reduce Soviet industrial capacity by 30 to 40%, but only temporarily without follow-up attacks. The Harmon report had three immediate results: 1) It supported those within the United States Navy and elsewhere who criticized the centrality of atomic bombs and mass attacks on cities in American war planning. 2) It led to a substantial rise in nuclear-weapons production. 3) It caused the Joint Chiefs of Staff to, in the fall of 1949, assign SAC with the duty of slowing a Soviet invasion of Western Europe as part of NATO. Erroneous US and British intelligence reports led to exaggerated NATO estimates of Soviet conventional forces. One 1951 estimate foresaw 175 combat divisions allegedly prepared to simultaneously attack Western Europe, the United Kingdom, the Balkans, the Middle East, and North America. The perceived imbalance in forces was so great that American planners feared that even Britain would have to be abandoned during the invasion, a possibility they did not discuss with their British counterparts.

Stalin did consider the possibility of war in Asia, as opposed to Europe. In January 1950, he approved Kim Il Sung's proposal to conquer South Korea in what became the Korean War that summer, believing that victory there would discredit NATO. The gambit backfired, however; despite their initial optimism the Communists were unable to defeat the US-led forces in Korea, and the war greatly increased Western military spending, for the first time making NATO a significant threat against the Soviets in Europe. By late 1950, the USSR notified its Eastern European satellites to prepare for war by the end of 1952, a date matching Western estimates. In early 1951, based on an alleged NATO plan to launch a European war that year from Western proxy Yugoslavia during the Informbiro period as a response to its defeat in Korea, he ordered a massive increase in Eastern European forces that hurt the weaker Communist economies. Based on the Korean precedent, the Soviets apparently expected that the West would not use atomic weapons in a European war. During Stalin's lifetime, Soviet doctrine foresaw the next war as a more destructive version of World War II similarly decided by giant armies supported by massive home fronts, a type of conflict which benefited from the Soviet Union's innate strengths.

The Soviet Union tested its first atomic weapon in 1949, but Stalin seems to have viewed possessing it as a political rather than military benefit, and he did not integrate atomic weapons into the Soviet military's equipment. A 1951 Warsaw Pact war plan for Poland was, Vojtech Mastny wrote, "unequivocally defensive" even while "NATO was haunted by the nightmare of armed communist hordes sweeping all but unopposed through Europe". The Soviets assumed that Western forces were ready to invade and that Eastern Europeans would see them as liberators; as in the West, the Soviets overestimated their enemies' strength.

By this time, Truman was pessimistic about international arms control and told his advisors "Since we can't obtain international control we must be strongest in atomic weapons." He approved the Harmon report's recommendation for increased weapons production, and approved another increase soon after the start of the Korean War. JCS decided to emphasize "the destruction of known targets affecting the Soviet capability to deliver atomic bombs", with refineries, chemical and power plants, and shipyards as secondary and tertiary targets. The three categories were codenamed BRAVO (blunting), ROMEO (retardation), and DELTA (disruption/destruction) of the Soviet ability to fight, and formed the basis of American nuclear targeting for almost a decade.

When military theorist Bernard Brodie studied the resulting target list, however, he strongly criticized the planners' ignorance of actual Soviet military capacity and the resulting failure to estimate what effect the attacks would have. Brodie later recalled that "There was no calculated strategy for destroying Soviet capability to make war. The planners "simply expected the Soviet Union 'to collapse' as a result of the bombing campaign.... People kept talking about the 'Sunday punch'." He recommended that targets be chosen based on analysis of the results of their destruction, and that "city-avoidance" strategies be studied. Brodie presented his report in April 1951, but JCS found SAC head General Curtis LeMay more persuasive. LeMay objected to the list because of the difficulty of attacking isolated targets and the requirement for pre-attack reconnaissance for many of them. He preferred attacking industrial targets in urban areas so that even if a bomb missed, "a bonus will be derived from the use of the bomb". The target panel agreed to have SAC review future target lists before sending them to JCS.

==== Eisenhower ====
By the end of 1953, SAC would have 1,000 nuclear-capable bombers and was deploying the B-47 jet bomber. In January 1953, Dwight D. Eisenhower inherited the Truman administration's large defense budget. The new president believed such expenditures threatened the economy, and cut $5 billion in defense spending that spring. Based on extensive experience with nuclear strategy and targeting from his terms as Chief of Staff of the United States Army and NATO Supreme Allied Commander, the Eisenhower administration's NSC 162/2 of October 1953 chose a less expensive, defensive-oriented direction for the military that emphasized "massive retaliation", still primarily delivered by USAF, to deter war.

The document formalized efforts begun under Truman to deploy newly developed tactical nuclear weapons small enough for most Air Force and Navy planes. The administration believed that they would be useful both during a general war and to deter a local one in Europe. A World War I Army artillery officer, Truman was uncomfortable with using atomic weapons on civilians but said "a half dozen batteries with atomic explosives can wipe out an entire front on the other side". Eisenhower said of tactical weapons that "on strictly military targets and for strictly military purposes, I see no reason why they shouldn't be used just exactly as you would use a bullet or anything else".

The doctrine of massive retaliation meant that, for the first time, atomic weapons became the basis of NATO strategy rather than an option of last resort. Similarly, the Soviet doctrine of non-atomic warfare began to change after Stalin's death in March 1953. In September that year a general proposed in a military journal that new weaponry might end a war quickly unlike World War II, and in October the Soviet Army held its first military exercise based on the enemy using atomic weapons. In 1954 Soviet forces in Europe received their first tactical atomic weapons, by which time Soviet officers publicly debated in the journal the merits of preemptive war.

==== Prevention versus preemption ====
Many in the West also seriously discussed the idea of preventive and preemptive war. Truman rejected preventive war, stating that "[s]tarting an atomic war is totally unthinkable for rational men", but Attlee stated in 1945 that "twice is he armed who gets in the first blow". JCS proposed in 1947 that the president be authorized to use atomic bombs to prevent a nuclear attack. NSC 68 of April 1950 opposed "a military attack not provoked by a military attack on us or on our allies", but acknowledged "if possible" the benefits of preemptively "landing the first blow" before the Soviet Union did so. In August 1950 Secretary of the Navy Francis Matthews publicly advocated a preventive war, but NSC 68 forecast that even after a massive preventive attack the USSR would likely not surrender and its forces could still "dominate most or all of Eurasia."

A committee led by retired general Jimmy Doolittle suggested in spring 1953 that the administration study the possibility of giving the Soviets two years to cooperate, with the threat of possible war otherwise, and an Air Force study in August warned of "The Coming National Crisis" due to having to negotiate with a country run by "the whims of a small group of proven barbarians". Eisenhower and Secretary of State John Foster Dulles discussed that month their fears that, once the Soviets acquired fusion weapons, the resulting situation might force the United States into either war or dictatorship. The president disagreed with the Doolittle committee. His administration in 1954 issued a Basic National Security Policy statement: "The United States and its allies must reject the concept of preventive war or acts intended to provoke war".

While Eisenhower and other civilian and military leaders doubted the morality or legality of preventive war, preemptive war was much less problematic given that NSC 5410/1 March 1954 acknowledged that "the survival of the United States" was at risk. The Central Intelligence Agency believed that it could warn of a surprise Soviet attack days or even weeks ahead of time because of the necessary preparation time, and that up to 30 days would be needed to deliver all Soviet weapons. The BRAVO-ROMEO-DELTA targeting strategy continued, with tactical weapons to be used in Europe while SAC delivered strategic weapons to the USSR.

LeMay disagreed with the JCS strategy of SAC making three separate attacks during a Soviet war: The first against airfields, the second on advancing troops, the third on cities and government centers. He continued to favor the "Sunday Punch" approach, in which his more than one thousand bomber crews as of 1954 could deliver 750 bombs in a few hours, while the USSR might need one month to deliver its 150 bombs. Weapons Systems Evaluation Group calculated that the 750 bombs would cause 17 million Soviet-bloc deaths and 60 million casualties. SAC obtained almost independent target selection by 1955. The Air Force often used target lists to justify greater weapons production, then greater spending on delivery systems for the additional weapons. Although other services opposed such "bootstrapping", they did not have the IBM 704 computer that SAC used to analyze target priorities so could not offer competing selection lists. Its Basic War Plan of March 1954 planned for up to 735 bombers to simultaneously and massively attack all targets, military and urban, in the USSR. Eisenhower preferred to avoid civilian targets, and by 1954 several Air Force planners advocated a "no-cities" strategy.

Other planners and USAF leadership believed that the Soviet Union could support its "immense armed forces for at least two years of intensive warfare" if industrial and government centers were not attacked. The possibility existed, they believed, that SAC could in fact deliver a "decisive" attack on the USSR, a tempting idea given the power of the 15-megaton hydrogen bombs being tested. In a 1956 speech to the National War College, LeMay said that if SAC was ordered to use its full nuclear arsenal against the USSR, "Between sunset tonight and sunrise tomorrow morning the Soviet Union would likely cease to be a major military power or even a major nation", while the USSR could not yet do the same to the US but was building the necessary arsenal. He stated in a 1988 interview that

[t]here was a time in the 1950s when we could have won a war against Russia. It would have cost us essentially the accident rate of the flying time, because their defenses were pretty weak. One time in the 1950s we flew all of the reconnaissance aircraft that SAC possessed over Vladivostok at high noon ... We could have launched bombing attacks, planned and executed just as well, at that time. So I don't think I am exaggerating when I say we could have delivered the stockpile had we wanted to do it, with practically no losses.

Because of the prohibition of the US starting a preventive war, LeMay may have been trying to provoke the Soviets to raise their alert level high enough to justify a preemptive war. Two studies soon concluded that the opportunity to easily win such a war either no longer existed or would soon disappear. Weapons Systems Evaluation Group stated in February 1955 that destroying all known Soviet bases would require twice as large a force as the United States expected to field. A National Security Council study found that by mid-1958 the only defense against a devastating Soviet attack would be to attack first after being warned, which Eisenhower believed was impossible. Given the apparent impracticality of massive retaliation strategy, Army Chiefs of Staff Matthew Ridgway and his successor Maxwell Taylor argued within JCS that deterrence, instead of the "worst case" scenario of a full-scale nuclear war, should be the focus.

More conventional forces were needed to prevent limited wars from leading to larger nuclear ones; similarly, tactical nuclear weapons should be avoided in local wars to prevent escalation. Eisenhower, however, believed that tactical weapons should be viewed similarly to very large conventional "blockbusters", and did not want American forces stalled within small wars. Massive retaliation remained the basis of American war planning; the Killian Committee reported in 1955 that "We have an offensive advantage but are vulnerable to surprise attack" (emphasis in original), and NATO estimated after the Hungarian revolution of 1956 that during wartime Western forces would retreat to the Rhine River within 48 hours.

By the 1950s, around 5,500 targets were listed to receive SAC bomber strikes; these targets consisted primarily of industrial sites but included counterforce targets. These plans, primarily by the Air Force, tended to be based on selecting targets in order to use up the available weapons, rather than considering the desired effects or strategic outcomes. From a 1957 letter from John H. Moore, former director of nuclear planning, air operations branch, United States European Command, Air Force target planning methodology can be inferred "blast damage frame," with such references as "damage to concrete structures" and the requirement for a "high probability of cratering runways." He cited the "destructive and disruptive nature of nuclear weapons" with megaton yields: "the cumulative or ancillary effects may be as great or greater than primary damage." Specifically, he considered delayed radiation but not thermal effects, but called attention to the idea of "bonus" effects, in which the totality of weapons effects would allow lower-yield weapons to achieve the "desired destruction." In the letter to the head of the Atomic Energy Commission, Lewis Strauss, Moore noted that the Pentagon "rigorously suppressed" this study and destroyed all copies.

Prior to the development of SIOP and survivable command and control, Eisenhower predelegated nuclear release authority to certain senior commanders. In April 1956, for example, he authorized Air Defense Command to use Genie air-to-air and Nike Hercules surface-to-air missiles during a surprise attack. There have continued to be Continuity of Nuclear Operations Plans (COOP), which designated enough subordinates who, in the event of the National Command Authority and immediate successors being killed in a "decapitation" attack, could still retaliate. While the details have never been made public, Eisenhower's predelegation, and a Federation of American Scientists summary, give a framework.

=== Presidential involvement and the start of civilian policy direction ===
In 1958, George Kistiakowsky, a key Manhattan Project scientist and Science Advisor in the Eisenhower Administration, suggested to the president that inspection of foreign military facilities was not sufficient to control their nuclear weapons. Kistiakowsky was particularly concerned with the difficulty of verifying the number, type, and deployment of nuclear-armed missiles on missile submarines, and proposed that the arms control strategy focus on disarmament rather than inspections. He was also concerned with the short warning times available from intercontinental ballistic missile (ICBM) launches, which took away the lengthy decision time available when the nuclear threat came exclusively from crewed bombers.

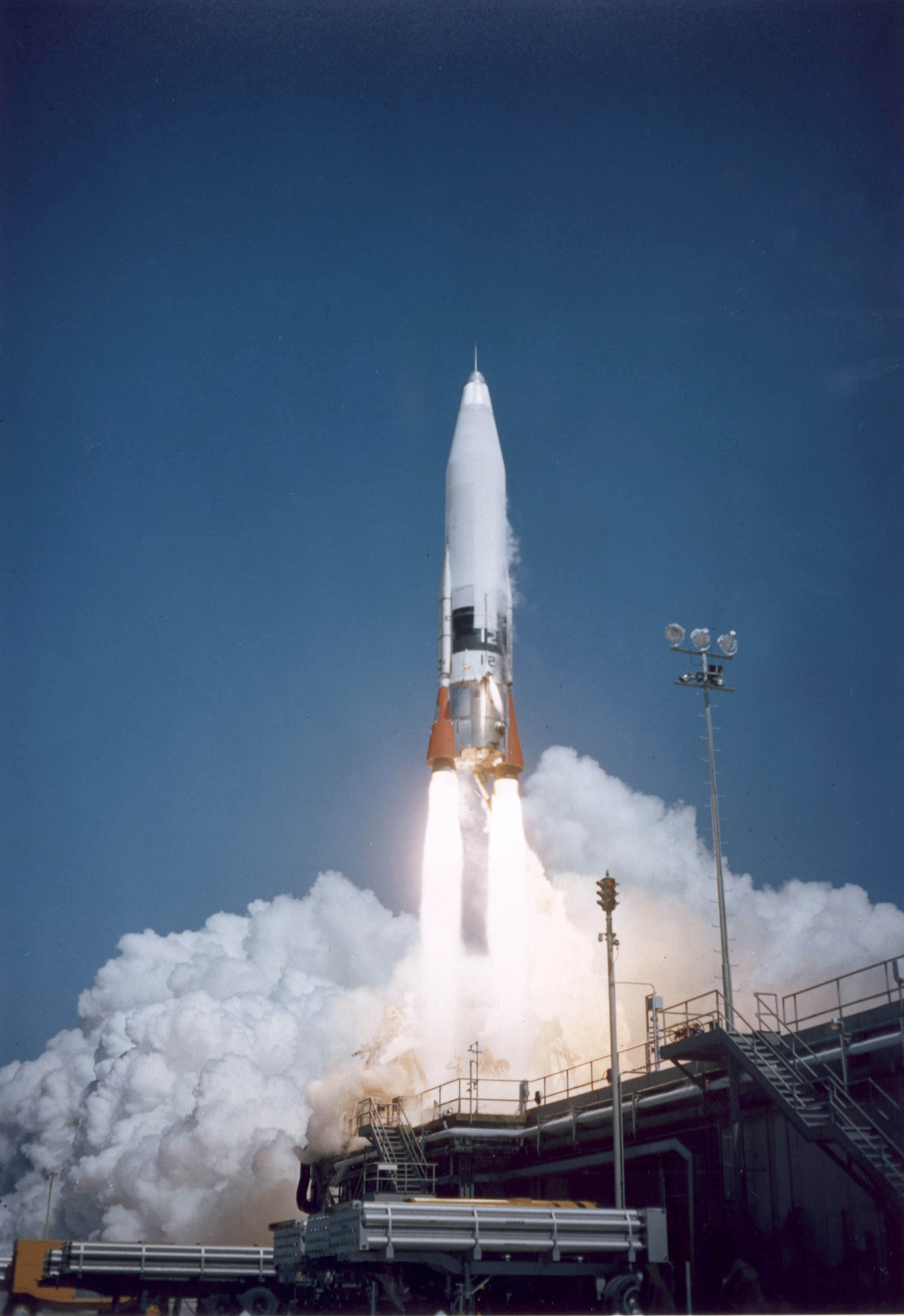
Atlas, a first-generation ICBM

Eisenhower sent Kistiakowsky to Strategic Air Command headquarters where he was, at first, rebuffed. At the same time as the early nuclear arms control work, the Chairman of the Joint Chiefs of Staff, General Nathan F. Twining, USAF, sent a memorandum in August 1959, to the Secretary of Defense, Neil McElroy, which suggested that the Strategic Air Command be formally assigned responsibility to prepare the national nuclear target list, and a single plan for nuclear operations. Up to that point, the Army, Navy, and Air Force had done their own target planning. That had led to individual targets being multiply targeted by the different services. The separate service plans were not mutually supporting, as, for example, by the Navy destroying an air defense facility on the route of an Air Force bomber going to a target deeper inland. While Twining had sent the memo to McElroy, the members of the Joint Chiefs of Staff disagreed on the policy during early 1960. Thomas Gates, who succeeded McElroy, asked President Dwight D. Eisenhower to decide the policy.

Eisenhower said he would not "leave his successor with the monstrosity" of the uncoordinated and non-integrated forces that then existed. When Kistiakowsky was not given access, Eisenhower sent him back with a much stronger set of orders giving SAC officers the choice to cooperate with Kistiakowsky, or resign.

Kistiakowsky's report, presented on 29 November, described uncoordinated plans with huge numbers of targets, many of which would be attacked by multiple forces, resulting in overkill. Eisenhower was shocked by the plans, and focused not just on the creation of the Single Integrated Operational Plan (SIOP), but on the entire process of picking targets, generating requirements, and planning for nuclear war operations. Separate operational plans from the Air Force and the Navy were combined to form the foundation of the SIOP.

=== The first SIOP ===
The first plan, following the White House policy guidance, was developed in 1960, consisting of a list of targets (the National Strategic Target List, or NSTL) and the assets to be used against each target. The targets themselves were pulled from the Bombing Encyclopedia, which listed over 80,000 targets of interest. This first SIOP was extensively revised by a team at the RAND Corporation to become SIOP-62, describing a massive strike with the entire US arsenal of 3,200 warheads, totaling 7,847 megatons, against the USSR, China, and Soviet-aligned states with urban and other targets being hit simultaneously. Nine weapons were to be "laid down" on four targets in Leningrad, 23 weapons on six target complexes in Moscow, 18 on seven target areas in Kaliningrad, etc.

Weapons scientist George Rathjens looked through SAC's atlas of Soviet cities, searching for the town that most closely resembled Hiroshima in size and industrial concentration. (The bomb that destroyed Hiroshima had a yield of 12.5 kilotons or 0.013 megaton.) When Rathjens found a city that roughly matched, he asked how many bombs the SIOP "laid down" on that city. The reply: one 4.5 megaton bomb and three more 1.1 megaton weapons in case the big bomb was a dud. The execution of SIOP-62 was estimated to result in 285 million dead and 40 million casualties in the Soviet Union and China. Presented with all the facts and figures, Thomas D. White of the Air Force found the Plan "splendid." Disregarding the human aspect, SIOP-62 represented an outstanding technological achievement:

SIOP-62 represented a technical triumph in the history of war planning. In less than fifteen years the United States had mastered a variety of complex technologies and acquired the ability to destroy most of an enemy's military capability and much of the human habitation of a continent in a single day.

The first SIOP, based on the massive retaliation doctrine, had little flexibility, treating all Communist countries as a uniform bloc. Document JCS 2056/220 expressed the concerns of U.S. Marine Commandant David Shoup that the 1961 draft was inconsistent with a 1959 NSC policy guidance paper approved by Eisenhower. Shoup was especially concerned with language in the draft SIOP that said

The United States should utilize all requisite force against selected targets in the USSR—and as necessary in Communist China, European Bloc and non-European bloc countries—to attain the above objectives. Military targets in Bloc countries other than the USSR and Communist China will be attacked as necessary.

The National Security Archive commentary reports that Shoup asked USAF/SAC Commander Thomas Power "...what would happen if Beijing was not fighting; was there an option to leave Chinese targets out of the attack plan?" Power was reported to have said that he hoped no one would think of that "because it would really screw up the plan"—that is, the plan was supposed to be executed as a whole. Apparently, Shoup then observed that "any plan that kills millions of Chinese when it isn't even their war is not a good plan. This is not the American way."

SIOP-62 included the virtual obliteration of the tiny country of Albania because within its borders sat huge Soviet air-defense radar, which had to be taken out with high assurance. Power smiled at Secretary of Defense Robert McNamara and said with a mock straight face: "Well, Mr. Secretary, I hope you don't have any friends or relations in Albania, because we are just going to have to wipe it out." McNamara was left with a "macabre, shallow, and horrifying" impression.

==== SIOP-63 ====
During 1961–1962, the Kennedy administration revised this plan as supervised by McNamara. He aimed to change the doctrine from massive retaliation to flexible response. SIOP-63 took effect in July 1962 and remained mostly unchanged for more than ten years. Instead of one "spasm" attack, it proposed five escalating attack options:

1. Soviet nuclear missile sites, bomber airfields, and submarine tenders.
2. Other military sites away from cities, such as air defenses.
3. Military sites near cities.
4. Command-and-control centers.
5. Full-scale "spasm" attack.

Many smaller target options were also created for possible use. The plan contemplated the possibility that options 1 and 2 be used to prevent an "impending major Sino-Soviet Bloc attack upon the U.S. or its allies". By 1963, however, McNamara concluded that such plans were useless, because the situations for which nuclear weapons might be used were so unpredictable that advanced planning was impossible.

The five attack options did not address each target category (much less any subsets) separately. Rather, the options were cumulative, each adding a target category to the previous one. All required the expenditure of thousands of nuclear weapons and were subsequently criticized as "five options for massive retaliation."

By the mid-1960s both sides had much more accurate understanding of the opposition's forces. While the Soviets were catching up to the Americans' strategic nuclear weapons, NATO was catching up to the Warsaw Pact's conventional forces, in part with tactical nuclear weapons. This increased both sides' confidence; a 1964 Warsaw Pact plan for Czechoslovakia written as a result of the Berlin Crisis of 1961 assumed that the East could capture Lyon within two weeks after the start of hostilities, while contemporary NATO plans expected that it could stop the Warsaw Pact near the eastern border of West Germany, in contrast to the earlier fears of the English Channel if at all. The Warsaw Pact plan did not consider the possibility that American strategic weapons might have crippled the Soviet Union, assuming that superior Soviet air defenses would have stopped most enemy missiles while invading NATO troops would have, the plan stated, "suffered enormous losses from [Soviet] nuclear strikes".

The Czechoslovakia plan was approved on 14 October 1964, the day Soviet leader Nikita Khrushchev was overthrown, and after the Prague Spring in 1968 the Soviets had to completely remove the Czech military from its plans. By the late 1960s they moved to a war strategy that lessened the dependence on nuclear weapons, resembling the West's flexible response. Warsaw Pact plans continued to assume, however, that NATO would make a surprise attack which it would repulse into the west; the East Germans even prepared occupation currency and new street signs.

=== Counterforce migrates to deterrence and warfighting ===
Studies began in 1972–1973 to provide more flexibility for the use of American nuclear weapons. In January 1974 President Richard M. Nixon approved NSDM-242, intended to add more "limited employment options" to help manage escalation, to SIOP-63. The related Nuclear Weapons Employment Policy (NUWEP) of April 1974 provided targets to achieve various goals; for example, the document stated that the United States nuclear forces must possess the ability to destroy 70% of the industrial capacity the Soviet Union needed to recover after a war. These documents formed the basis of SIOP-5 (January 1976), sometimes called the Schlesinger Doctrine after Secretary of Defense James Schlesinger. The ever-expanding target lists were split into classes of targets, with a wider range of plans matching strikes to political intentions from counterforce to countervalue, or any mix/withhold strategy to control escalation. Schlesinger described the doctrine as having three main aspects:

1. The National Command Authority or its successors should have many choices about the use of weapons, always having an option to escalate.
2. Targeting should make it very explicit that the first requisite is selective retaliation against the enemy's military (i.e., tailored counterforce).
3. Some targets and target classes should not be struck, at least at first, to give the opponent a rational reason to terminate the conflict. Reduced collateral damage was another benefit of this "withhold" method.

The SIOP policy was further modified during the Carter presidency under Presidential Directive 59, a key section of which stated

The employment of nuclear forces must be effectively related to operations of our general purpose forces. Our doctrines for the use of forces in nuclear conflict must insure that we can pursue specific policy objectives selected by the National Command Authorities at that time, from general guidelines established in advance. (S)

These requirements form the broad outline of our evolving countervailing strategy. To meet these requirements, improvements should be made to our forces, their supporting C3 and intelligence, and their employment plans and planning apparatus, to achieve a high degree of flexibility, enduring survivability, and adequate performance in the face of enemy actions. The following principles and goals should guide your efforts in making these improvements. (S)

PD59 explored a "warfighting" doctrine that suggested that nuclear plans might change during a war, and that nuclear weapons were to be used in combination with conventional weapons. Carter's Secretary of Defense, Harold Brown, emphasized selective counterforce, but also explicitly threatened the Soviet leadership themselves. Major improvements in U.S. command, control, communications and intelligence (C3I), including making elements survivable during a nuclear war, were instituted to make the PD-59 doctrine feasible. Although secret NATO guidelines reportedly limited the size of nuclear weapons that the alliance could use on its territory to 10 kilotons, and prohibited their use in urban NATO areas, by 1982 SIOP-5 contained more than 40,000 possible targets in four categories:

1. Soviet nuclear forces. Examples: ICBM launch centers and control facilities, bomber airfields, ballistic-missile submarine bases.
2. Conventional forces. Examples: Supply depots, conventional airfields, ammunition storage, tank storage yards.
3. Military and political centers. Examples: Command posts, communications facilities.
4. Economic and industrial centers. Examples: Factories for ammunition and tanks, refineries, steel and aluminum plants, power plants.

Whether Soviet military doctrine recognized the difference between counterforce and a general attack was unknown. A 1982 analysis stated, however, that the technically inferior Soviet attack-assessment system would likely have difficulty in differentiating between such attacks. In any case, given that the majority of Soviet nuclear airfields and missile sites were located west of the Ural mountains, many in major population centers, the analysis concluded that the American plans for flexible use of force were meaningless. The author was also skeptical of whether communications to manage escalation—whether on the Moscow–Washington hotline, or between command authorities and their deployed nuclear submarines and bombers—could be maintained, and observed that use of nuclear weapons "are not suited to signalling any precise and unambiguous message".

=== Return to counterforce, with strategic defense ===
During the Reagan administration, there was a return to a strong counterforce strategy through NSDD-13. This included development of strategic weapons systems that were more accurate, more survivable, or both. Some of these systems eventually took the role of bargaining chips in arms control negotiations, although some, such as the B-2 "stealth" bomber remained highly classified as potential surprises in war. The B-2 was also seen as a counter to Soviet deployment of mobile missiles, which only a crewed bomber could find and attack.

In 1983, President Reagan gave a speech proposing, at the least, research and development into non-nuclear defense systems against nuclear-armed missiles. The idea of an effective Strategic Defense Initiative was a potential disruption to the existing balance of Mutual assured destruction, even with its "warfighting" refinements.

=== Renaming and refocusing ===
On 1 March 2003, the SIOP was renamed "OPLAN 8022", and later CONPLAN (contingency plan) 8022. It went into deployment in July 2004, but it was reported cancelled in July 2007. It may have been superseded by an expanded CONPLAN 8044.

Another set of "Global Strike" plans include a jointly coordinated a nuclear option, intended for other than the general nuclear war situations, principally with Russia but possibly also with China, postulated in OPLAN 8022. Global Strike plans are codified in CONPLAN 8044.

== Executing the SIOP ==
The president, as a member of the National Command Authority, (NCA) may order the use of nuclear weapons. Subsequent to the president's decision, the release of nuclear weapons is governed by the two-man rule at all times. All military personnel that participate in loading, arming, or firing weapons, as well as transmitting launch orders, are subject to the Personnel Reliability Program (PRP).

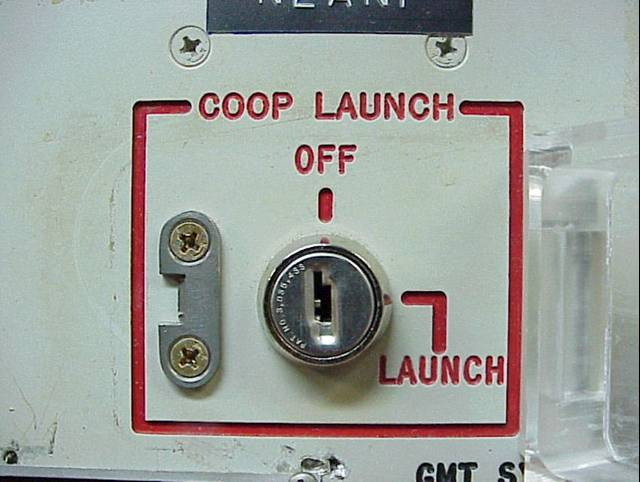
A deputy's launch keyswitch in an old Minuteman ICBM launch control center. The commander's key was too far away to be turned by the same person.

If the NCA decides that the United States must launch nuclear weapons, the decision is communicated to the Chairman of the Joint Chiefs of Staff (CJCS) and through them to the National Military Command Center (often called the "war room") via the Presidential Emergency Satchel, informally referred to as the "football." Inside the football is a black book listing a menu of strike options and "The Biscuit," a 3-by-5-inch card with authentication codes for the president to confirm their identity. The menu of strike options include Major Attack Options (MAOs), Selected Attack Options (SAOs), and Limited Attack Options (LAOs). Individual countries or regions can be included in or withheld from nuclear attacks depending on circumstances.

To communicate the order, the CJCS, or, in their absence, the senior officer in the NMCC verifies the president's identity with a "challenge code" and the president responds with the corresponding authentication code from the biscuit. Additionally, the message will go to the Alternate National Military Command Center (ANMCC), located in Raven Rock Mountain, Pennsylvania, and also to an airborne command post, either the presidential National Airborne Operations Center (NAOC) or the military E-6 Mercury Looking Glass. If the NMCC is destroyed by a first strike, either the ANMCC, NAOC or Looking Glass can issue the orders to execute the SIOP.

The senior NMCC officer directs preparation of the launch order in the form of an Emergency War Order (EWO) – a message that contains the chosen war plan, time to launch, authentication codes and codes needed to unlock the missiles before firing them. A second officer will validate that order. The order is then broadcast to each worldwide command and directly to launch crews by releasing an Emergency Action Message (EAM) which is an encoded and encrypted message about 150 characters long.

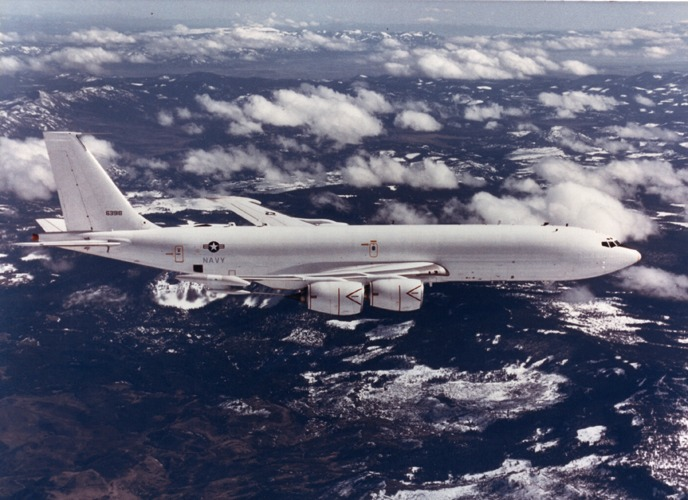
E-6 Mercury

As the orders go down the chain of command, always subject to the two-man rule, intermediate headquarters, and eventually the nuclear delivery platforms themselves, will receive Emergency Action Messages (EAM) to arm or launch weapons. For most modern weapons, the EAM will also include codes for Permissive Action Links (PAL). At a minimum, a PAL code will actually arm a weapon for release. The circuitry controlling the PAL is deliberately positioned inside the warhead such that it cannot be reached without disabling the weapon, at a minimum, to a level that would require a full factory-level rebuild. There may be separate PAL codes for arming and launch. Some weapons have "dial-a-yield" functions that allow the power of the nuclear explosion to be adjusted from minimum to maximum yield. Most weapons have additional arming circuitry that, even if a valid launch code is entered, will not arm the warhead unless the weapon senses that it has been released on an expected delivery path. For example, the first steps of the final arming process for a ballistic missile depend on physical characteristics of the weapon release, such as the acceleration of a rocket launch, zero-gravity coasting, and various physical aspects of hypersonic reentry into the atmosphere. A gravity bomb dropped from an aircraft will detect the altitude of release and the decreasing altitude as it falls.

Journalist Ron Rosenbaum has pointed out that the SIOP is entirely concerned with the identity of the commanding officer and the authenticity of the order, and there are no safeguards to verify that the person issuing the order is actually sane. "The president has supreme authority to decide whether to use America's nuclear weapons. Period. Full stop," says the Arms Control Association's Kingston Reif. A president could only be stopped by mutiny, he explained, and more than one person would have to disobey the president's orders. Notably, Major Harold Hering was eventually forced out of the Air Force for asking during his missile training course how he could know that an order to launch his missiles was "lawful," that it came from a sane president, one who wasn't "imbalance[d]" or "berserk."

== United Kingdom participation ==
Although after World War II the formal military alliance between the United States and United Kingdom no longer existed, American postwar war plans required using British air bases until the United States developed ICBMs and long-range bombers. American General Carl Spaatz and Chief of the Air Staff Lord Tedder informally agreed in 1946 to US aircraft using British bases. The discussions, and the subsequent actions such as extending runways, were so secret that it is unclear whether Prime Minister Clement Attlee was aware of them. By 1948, the year of the Berlin Blockade, British leaders expected that "in a future world conflict, US and British forces will find themselves fighting side by side" although the alliance had not been formally renewed. The two countries began coordinating their plans for a Soviet attack in Europe after the Czechoslovak coup d'état of 1948, and later that year LeMay, as head of SAC, asked Tedder to allow the basing of American atomic weapons in Britain. By the end of 1948, several British bases were atomic-capable or were close to being so, but the ability to fight an atomic war from Britain did not exist until April 1949 when Silverplate B-29 bombers began rotating through the bases, and no American atomic weapons were present in Britain until 1952.

Aware that with or without bombs, the bases made Britain what Winston Churchill called a "bull's-eye" for Soviet attack, he and other British leaders made repeated unsuccessful attempts to learn details of American war plans, and not until 1951 did the United States formally, if vaguely, agree to consult with Britain before using atomic weapons based there. As Tedder complained during the Berlin crisis, when war at any moment seemed possible, the defense of the West relied "on the use of a weapon about which we in fact know very little". British plans such as SPEEDWAY, which discussed American-British-Canadian joint planning for the early part of a war over the next 18 months, likely incorporated some information informally sent by the United States, including projections on future bomb production and targets. The Chiefs of Staff Committee was dissatisfied, however, writing that "We are at a disadvantage in that ... we do not know the details of the number of [American] atomic weapons to be used and so cannot assess with any accuracy the results that can be achieved."

The United States preferred that Britain not develop atomic weapons at all. Because of the American fear of the USSR obtaining British atomic technology after conquering the country, in February 1949 Eisenhower offered to General William Duthie Morgan American atomic weapons if the British nuclear weapons program ended. Britain would have used the weapons in its own aircraft for its own targets, but refused the offer, and the United States decided that partnership was preferable to losing influence with the United Kingdom. The British sought an independent, domestic nuclear deterrent that by itself could persuade the USSR to not attack, in part because they feared that America might not be willing to defend Europe with its nuclear missiles once the USSR could attack the United States itself, or during wartime not prioritize targets that threatened the United Kingdom. In 1950 RAF Bomber Command asked for, and received, 70 B-29s from the United States after offering to place them under the control of SAC during wartime. The bombers were becoming obsolete, however. The British never made them nuclear-capable, and the RAF refused the US's request for SAC's complete targeting control over the sophisticated British-built V bombers which began deploying in 1955. Britain's goal of an independent deterrent aimed at Soviet cities was so important that, when it offered to place the V Bombers under SACEUR authority in 1953 in exchange for American financial aid to purchase new fighters, it refused to agree to them being used in a tactical role against Soviet targets in Europe. The agreement permitted Britain to commit only nominal forces to SACEUR, and presaged future technology and targeting cooperation.

As the USAF began in 1955 helping the RAF to convert V bombers to carry American atomic weapons under Project E and hydrogen weapons under Project X, cooperation increased and the United States began sharing some war plan details. Although both nations remained reluctant to fully share their plans—as late as 1956, Britain did not have targeting information even for SAC aircraft it hosted—redundancies were eliminated by one side asking the other whether it planned to attack various targets. In February 1959, the USAF agreed to target 150 Soviet bases that threatened Britain with nuclear weapons, while V bombers would use nuclear weapons to attack Soviet air defenses before SAC arrived. The RAF retained a separate plan to attack 30 Soviet cities with hydrogen bombs. The agreement formed the basis for the ongoing nuclear-targeting cooperation between the two countries, and the different target types resembled the two nations' different priorities during the Combined Bomber Offensive of World War II. The Anglo-American dispute during the 1956 Suez Crisis only briefly disrupted the partnership, and the desire to restore relations to their former level, and the Sputnik crisis, increased American willingness to help Britain improve its atomic weaponry. In March 1957 the United States agreed to sell 60 Thor IRBMs, in 1958 American hydrogen-weapon designs, in 1960 the Skybolt ALBM, and after its cancellation the Polaris SLBM in 1962 as replacement. Polaris was especially notable; British officials initially refused to believe the Americans' offer of state-of-the-art submarine missiles at a moderate price, and one scholar later called it "amazing".

While its contribution to SIOP was minor compared to the enormous SAC arsenal of 1,600 bombers and 800 missiles, as RAF officers who worked with the Americans rose to leadership positions their experience benefited later partnerships between the two countries. The joint targeting plan changed over time; the 1962 list for the RAF included 48 cities, six air-defense sites, and three bomber bases, and the 1963 list had 16 cities, 44 airfields and other offensive sites, 10 air-defense sites, and 28 IRBM sites. The degree of cooperation was such by the Cuban Missile Crisis that RAF officers visiting SAC headquarters in Nebraska reported being "treated just like Americans. We went all through their briefings, computers, top secret rooms and so forth". While some British officers emphasized the continuing importance of maintaining the ability to act alone with an independent deterrent if necessary, by 1962 the independent list was essentially the RAF portion of the joint plan and no active training was done. The British emphasis on retaining an independent capability, however, continued over several decades and changes in government. As the Defence Council stated in 1980,

our force has to be visibly capable of making a massive strike on its own ... We need to convince Soviet leaders that even if they thought ... the US would hold back, the British force could still inflict a blow so destructive that the penalty for aggression would have proved too high.

While current United Kingdom's nuclear forces—four Trident Vanguard-class submarines—are strictly under UK national control, they had two distinct roles under the SIOP. The first was part of a UK-only retaliatory response to a nuclear attack, whether a full strategic strike, or a limited tactical strike. The second role was one in which the Royal Navy participated in the SIOP, in effect becoming an extension of the U.S. Navy's Trident submarines. This role was to be part of a NATO response to a Soviet nuclear strike. The Royal Navy's contribution to the SIOP was small. The four Vanguard submarines could strike a maximum of 512 separate targets; equivalent to 7% of the total U.S. nuclear strike capacity.

== SIOP in fiction ==
- In Dale Brown's novel Plan of Attack, it is revealed that Patrick McLanahan is one of the most highly valued personnel in the U.S. military because of his involvement in classified projects and knowledge of the American SIOP. However, because of McLanahan's involvement in controversial highly classified military actions, President Thorn largely ignores this fact and the warning of an imminent Russian attack until Russia launches a nuclear campaign against the US.
- In Eric L. Harry's novel Arc Light, the president decides to execute "SIOP 6-C" in a counterforce strike against Russia after a Russian general gained control of the nuclear codes and launched a massive attack against the US. In the book, "SIOP 6-C" had six thousand nuclear warheads assigned to be used, some of which were held in reserve.
- In William Prochnau's novel Trinity's Child, a Soviet nuclear sneak attack triggers US retaliation. There is discussion of SIOP among the unnamed US president, the military commander codenamed Alice on board the SAC Looking Glass aircraft who is advising the president, who has just been sworn in aboard Air Force One, and the president's primary military advisor. After the destruction of cities on both sides, Alice and the original president battle those on board Air Force One for control of the American missile submarine fleet. At stake is the expectation that launch of the Tridents as well as Soviet retaliation will raise the total death toll into the billions.
- In What Ifs? of American History, edited by Robert Cowley, one essay ("The Cuban Missile Crisis: Second Holocaust", by Robert L. O'Connell) outlines a scenario where the Cuban Missile Crisis leads, via miscalculations, incompetence, and trigger-happiness on both sides, to a two-day thermonuclear war, with horrific results in terms of both overkill and long-term effects on the world.
- In Tom Clancy's novel Without Remorse, the US intelligence community learns that US Air Force Colonel Robin Zacharias, shot down over Vietnam and reported killed in action by the Vietnamese, is in fact alive and being held in a prisoner-of-war camp. He is being debriefed by a Russian military intelligence officer and there is particular concern because Zacharias has been involved in strategic war plans and has knowledge of the SIOP.
- In Tom Clancy's novel The Sum of All Fears, USS Theodore Roosevelt is sailing in the Mediterranean when a nuclear bomb explodes in Denver. In response, the president orders DEFCON-2 for strategic forces and DEFCON-3 for the conventional ones. The crew's response to various perceived Soviet threats that arise after the alert is quite severe because supposedly by virtue of their geographic location they are now "part of SIOP" and so different, more aggressive rules of engagement apply (DEFCON-2 instead of DEFCON-3).
- In Eric Swedin's work When Angels Wept, the Cuban Missile Crisis turns into a war and after the death of President Kennedy, President Johnson orders the execution of SIOP-63, resulting in the destruction of the Communist Bloc (Soviet Union, Eastern Europe, and China).
- The movie WarGames involves eliminating the SIOP and placing the decision into the hands of a supercomputer, after a surprise drill sees one member of the two-man crew in a Minuteman ICBM Launch Control Facility refuses to follow orders to "launch" missiles. The computer is later led into a launch sequence, but since it is not given the proper launch codes, it begins a brute-force attack to determine the missile codes. After going to DEFCON 1, the computer realizes that war is futile, and ceases to follow its own attack.

== See also ==
- 625th Strategic Operations Squadron
- Nuclear strategy
- Nuclear posture review
- Mutual assured destruction (MAD)
- Nuclear utilization target selection (NUTS)
- Nuclear football
- Operation Dropshot
