= United States Secretary of Defense =

Head of the US Department of Defense

- Seal of the department (Note: Executive Order 14347 authorized the usage of "Department of War" as a secondary name (which is now preferred by the department), and per 10 U.S. Code § 112, the secretary of defense [war] may institute a new seal with the approval of the President, without Congressional approval.)

- Flag of the secretary

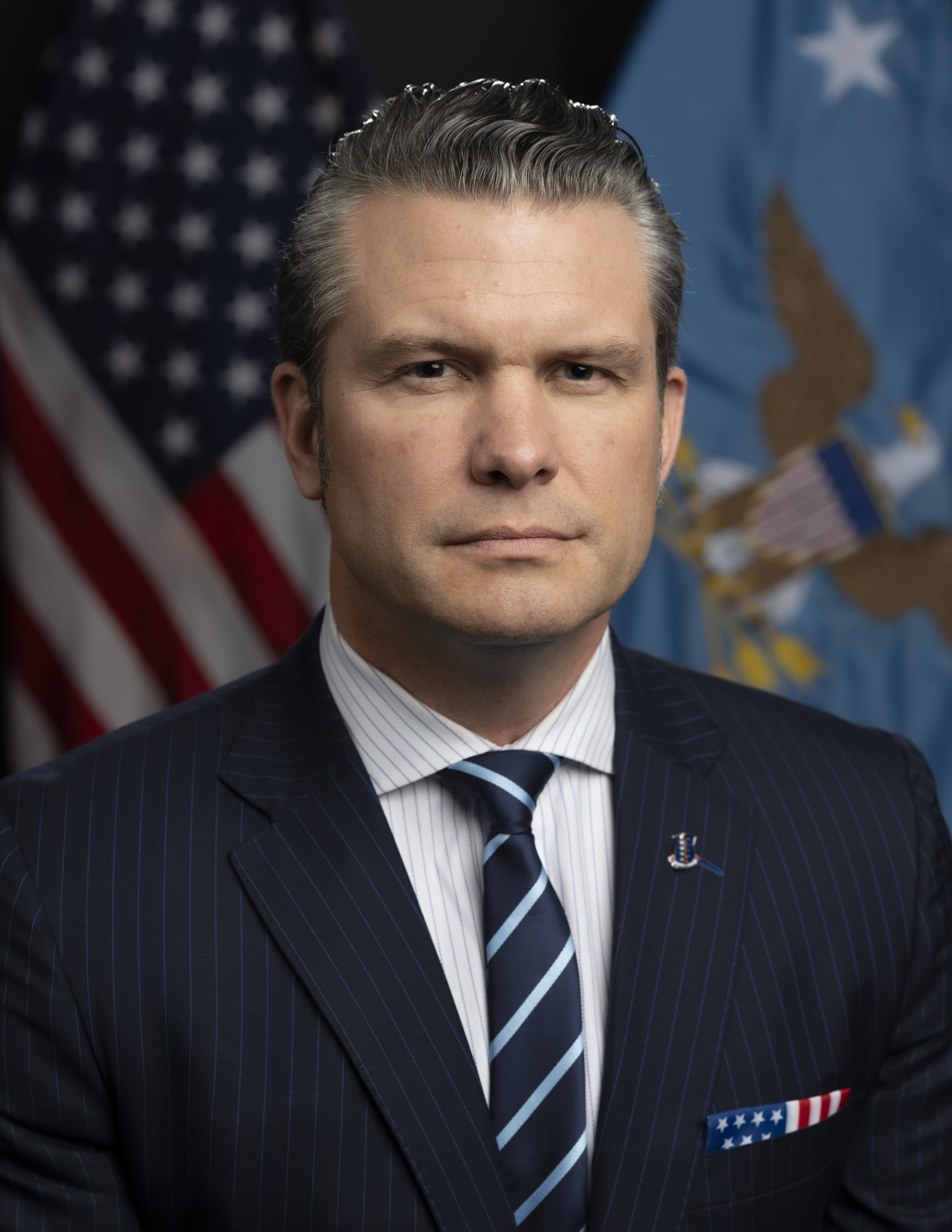
- Incumbent; Pete Hegseth since 25 January 2025
- United States Department of Defense
- Style: Mr. Secretary (informal); The Honorable (formal)
- Abbreviation: SecDef/SecWar or SECDEF/SECWAR
- Member of: Cabinet; National Security Council
- Reports to: President of the United States
- Seat: The Pentagon, Arlington County, Virginia
- Appointer: The president; with advice and consent of the Senate
- Term length: At the pleasure of the president
- Constituting instrument: 10 U.S.C. § 113
- Precursor: Secretary of War; Secretary of the Navy
- Formation: 17 September 1947
- First holder: James Forrestal
- Succession: Sixth
- Deputy: Deputy Secretary of Defense
- Salary: Executive Schedule, level I
- Website: war.gov

The United States secretary of defense (SecDef), secondarily titled the secretary of war (SecWar), (Note: As only an act of Congress can legally change the name of the position, in September 2025, President Donald Trump authorized "secretary of war" as a secondary title for use by the secretary, which is now preferred by the department.) is the head of the United States Department of Defense (DoD), the executive department of the U.S. Armed Forces, and is a high-ranking member of the Cabinet of the United States. The secretary of defense's position of command and authority over the military is second only to that of the president of the United States, who is the commander-in-chief. This position corresponds to what is generally known as a defense minister in many other countries. The president appoints the secretary of defense with the advice and consent of the Senate, and is by custom a member of the Cabinet and by law a member of the National Security Council.

Subject only to the orders of the president, the secretary of defense is in the chain of command and exercises command and control, for both operational and administrative purposes, over all DoD-administered service branches – the Army, Marine Corps, Navy, Air Force, and Space Force – as well as the Coast Guard when its command and control is transferred to the Department of Defense. Only the secretary of defense (or the president or Congress) can authorize the transfer of operational control of forces between the three military departments (Department of the Army, the Navy, and the Air Force) and the eleven unified combatant commands.

To ensure civilian control of the military, U.S. law provides that the secretary of defense cannot have served as an active-duty commissioned officer in the military in the preceding seven years except for generals and admirals, who cannot have served on active duty within the previous ten years. Congress can legislatively waive this restriction and has done so three times, for George C. Marshall Jr., James N. Mattis, and Lloyd J. Austin III. The chairman of the Joint Chiefs of Staff is the principal military advisor to the secretary of defense and the president; while the chairman may assist the secretary and president in their command functions, the chairman is not in the chain of command.

Because the secretary of defense is vested with legal powers that exceed those of any commissioned officer, and is second only to the president in the military hierarchy, its incumbent has sometimes unofficially been referred to as "deputy commander-in-chief". The secretary of state, the secretary of the treasury, the secretary of defense, and the attorney general are generally regarded as the four most important (and are officially the four most senior and oldest) cabinet officials because of the size and importance of their respective departments.

The current secretary of defense is Pete Hegseth, who was nominated by President Donald Trump and was confirmed by the Senate on 25 January 2025.

== History ==
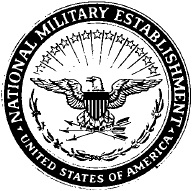
Seal of the National Military Establishment (1947–1949)

An Army, Navy, and Marine Corps were established in 1775, in concurrence with the American Revolution. They were managed under a committee of the Second Continental Congress. John Adams was the early chair of this committee. Under the Articles of Confederation, the Confederation Congress created a secretary to manage the military, sometimes called the "Secretary at War", in 1781. Benjamin Lincoln and then Henry Knox served as secretary during the Confederation. The War Department, headed by the secretary of war, was created by Act of Congress in 1789 and was responsible for both the Army and Navy (including, the Marines) until the founding of a separate Department of the Navy in 1798.

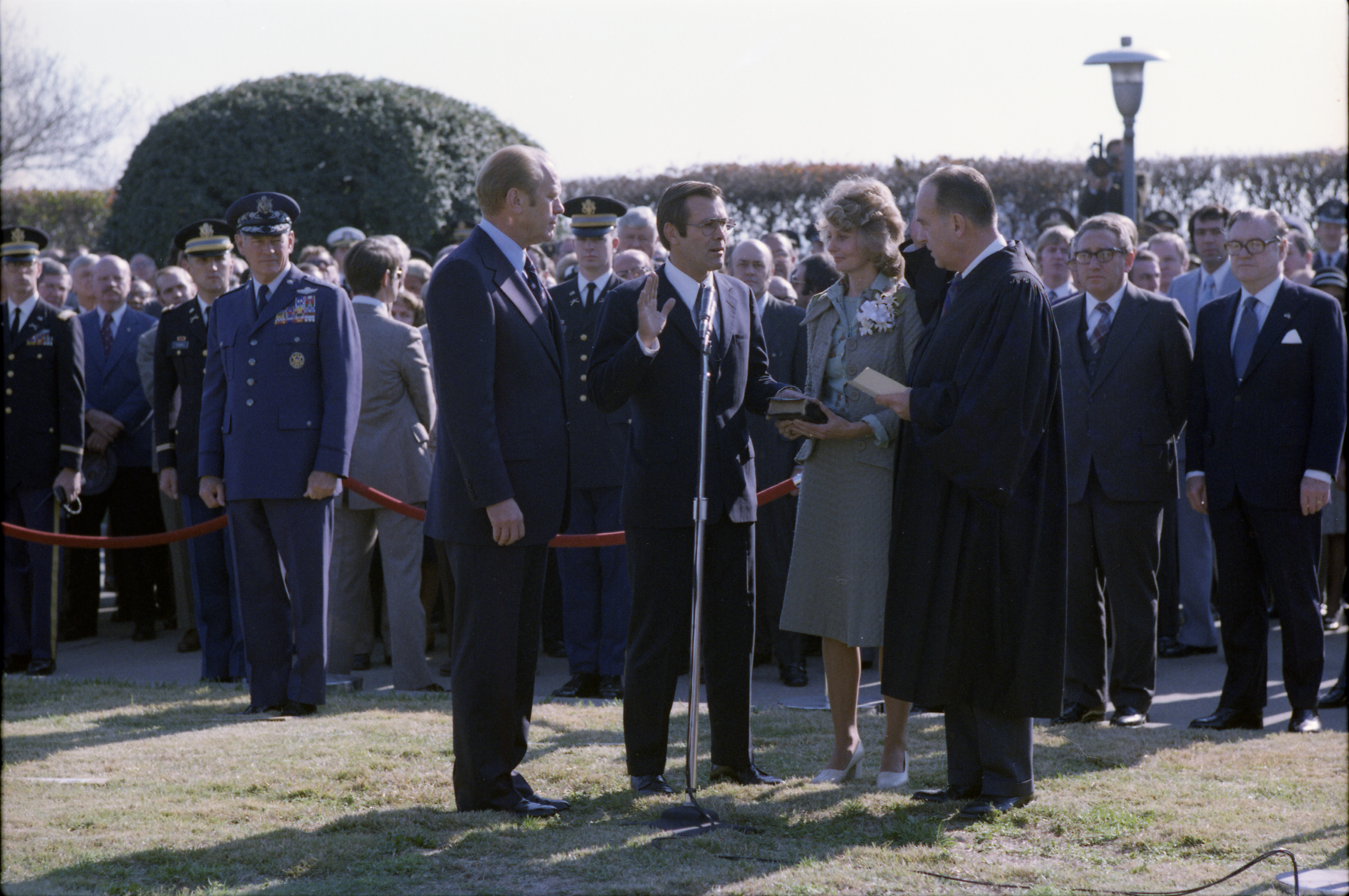
Donald Rumsfeld is sworn in as Secretary of Defense by Associate Supreme Court Justice Potter Stewart as U.S. President Gerald R. Ford and Chairman of The Joint Chiefs of Staff General George S. Brown watch at The Pentagon on 20 November 1975.

Based on the experiences of World War II, proposals were soon made on how to more effectively manage the large combined military establishment. The Army generally favored centralization while the Navy had institutional preferences for decentralization and the status quo. The resulting National Security Act of 1947 was largely a compromise between these divergent viewpoints. It renamed the Department of War the Department of the Army, and added both it and the Department of the Navy to a newly established National Military Establishment (NME). The act also separated the Army Air Forces from the Army to become its own branch of service in the NME, the United States Air Force under its own Department of the Air Force.

A new title was coined by the act for the head of the NME: Secretary of Defense. At first, each of the service secretaries maintained cabinet status. The first secretary of defense, James Forrestal, who in his previous capacity as the secretary of the Navy had opposed the creation of the new position, found it difficult to exercise authority over the other branches with the limited powers his office had at the time. To address this and other problems, the National Security Act was amended in 1949 to further consolidate the national defense structure in order to reduce interservice rivalry, directly subordinate the secretaries of the Army, the Navy and the Air Force to the secretary of defense in the chain of command, and rename the National Military Establishment as the Department of Defense, making it one Executive Department. The position of the deputy secretary of defense, the number two position in the department, was also created at this time.

The general trend since 1949 has been to further centralize management in the Department of Defense, elevating the status and authorities of civilian OSD appointees and defense-wide organizations at the expense of the military departments and the services within them. The last major revision of the statutory framework concerning the position was done in the Goldwater–Nichols Department of Defense Reorganization Act of 1986. In particular, it elevated the status of joint service for commissioned officers, making it in practice a requirement before appointments to general officer and flag officer grades could be made.

As the secretary of defense is a civilian position intended to be independent of the active-duty leadership, a secretary is required to have been retired from service for at least seven (originally ten) years unless a waiver is approved by Congress. Since the creation of the position in 1947, such a waiver has been approved only three times, for Army general George Marshall in 1950, Marine Corps General Jim Mattis in 2017, and retired Army general Lloyd Austin in 2021.

== Powers and functions ==
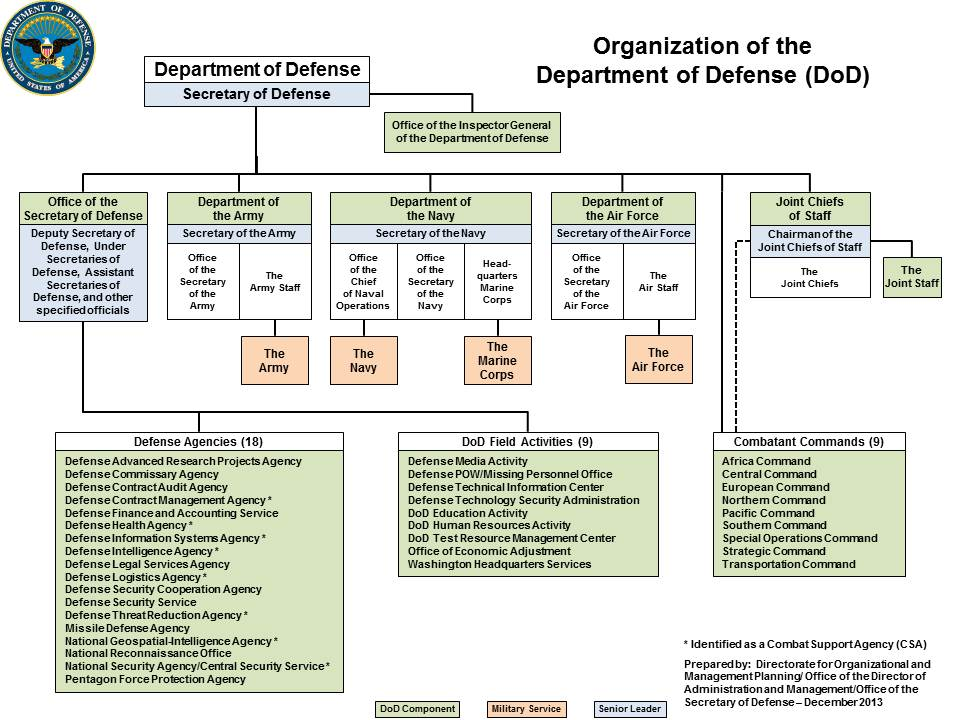
Department of Defense organizational chart (December 2013)

The secretary of defense, appointed by the president with the advice and consent of the Senate, is by federal law (10 U.S.C. § 113) the head of the Department of Defense, "the principal assistant to the President in all matters relating to Department of Defense", and has "authority, direction and control over the Department of Defense". Because the Constitution vests all military authority in Congress and the president, the statutory authority of the secretary of defense is derived from their constitutional authorities. Since it is impractical for either Congress or the president to participate in every piece of Department of Defense affairs, the secretary of defense and the secretary's subordinate officials generally exercise military authority.

As the head of DoD, all officials, employees and service members are "under" the secretary of defense. Some of those high-ranking officials, civil and military (outside of OSD and the Joint Staff) are: the secretary of the Army, secretary of the Navy, and secretary of the Air Force, Army chief of staff, commandant of the Marine Corps, chief of naval operations, Air Force chief of staff, chief of space operations, and chief of the National Guard Bureau and the combatant commanders of the combatant commands. All these high-ranking positions, civil and military, require Senate confirmation.

The Department of Defense is composed of the Office of the Secretary of Defense (OSD), the Joint Chiefs of Staff (JCS) and the Joint Staff (JS), Office of the Inspector General (DODIG), the combatant commands, the Military Departments (Department of the Army (DA), Department of the Navy (DON) & Department of the Air Force (DAF)), the Defense Agencies and DoD Field Activities, the National Guard Bureau (NGB), and such other offices, agencies, activities, organizations, and commands established or designated by law, or by the president or by the secretary of defense.

Department of Defense Directive 5100.01 describes the organizational relationships within the department and is the foundational issuance for delineating the major functions of the department. The latest version, signed by former secretary of defense Robert Gates in December 2010, is the first major re-write since 1987.

=== Office of the Secretary of Defense ===
The secretary's principally civilian staff element is called the Office of the Secretary of Defense (OSD) and is composed of the deputy secretary of defense (DEPSECDEF) and six under secretaries of defense in the fields of acquisition & sustainment, research & engineering, comptroller/chief financial officer, intelligence, personnel & readiness, and policy; several assistant secretaries of defense; other directors and the staffs under them. The Secretary of Defense is issuing through the Office of the Secretary of Defense the National Defense Strategy, a major policy document.

The name of the principally military staff organization, organized under the chairman of the Joint Chiefs of Staff, is the Joint Staff (JS).

=== Awards and decorations ===
The Defense Distinguished Service Medal (DDSM), the Defense Superior Service Medal (DSSM), the Defense Meritorious Service Medal (DMSM), the Joint Service Commendation Medal (JSCM) and the Joint Service Achievement Medal (JSAM) are awarded, to military personnel for service in joint duty assignments, in the name of the secretary of defense. In addition, there is the Joint Meritorious Unit Award (JMUA), which is the only ribbon (as in non-medal) and unit award issued to joint DoD activities, also issued in the name of the secretary of defense.

The DDSM is analogous to the distinguished services medals issued by the military departments (i.e. Army Distinguished Service Medal, Navy Distinguished Service Medal & Air Force Distinguished Service Medal), the DSSM corresponds to the Legion of Merit, the DMSM to the Meritorious Service Medal, the JSCM to the service commendation medals, and the JSAM to the achievement medals issued by the services. While the approval authority for DSSM, DMSM, JSCM, JSAM and JMUA is delegated to inferior DoD officials: the DDSM can be awarded only by the secretary of defense.

Recommendations for the Medal of Honor (MOH), formally endorsed in writing by the secretary of the military department concerned and the chairman of the Joint Chiefs of Staff, are processed through the under secretary of defense for personnel and readiness, and such recommendations be must approved by the secretary of defense before it can be handed over to the president, who is the final approval authority for the MOH, although it is awarded in the name of Congress.

The secretary of defense, with the concurrence of the secretary of state, is the approval authority for the acceptance and wear of NATO medals issued by the secretary general of NATO and offered to the U.S. permanent representative to NATO in recognition of U.S. servicemembers who meet the eligibility criteria specified by NATO.

=== Congressional committees ===
As the head of the department, the secretary of defense is the chief witness for the congressional committees with oversight responsibilities over the Department of Defense. The most important committees, with respect to the entire department, are the two authorizing committees, the Senate Armed Services Committee (SASC) and the House Armed Services Committee (HASC), and the two appropriations committees, the Senate Appropriations Committee and the House Appropriations Committee.

For the DoD intelligence programs the Senate Select Committee on Intelligence and the House Permanent Select Committee on Intelligence have the principal oversight role.

=== National Security Council ===
The secretary of defense is a statutory member of the National Security Council. As one of the principals, the secretary along with the vice president, secretary of state and the assistant to the president for national security affairs participates in biweekly Principals Committee (PC) meetings, preparing and coordinating issues before they are brought before full NSC sessions chaired by the president.

=== Role in the military justice system ===
The secretary is one of only five or six civilians authorized to act as convening authority in the military justice system for General Courts-Martial (10 U.S.C. § 822: article 22, UCMJ), Special Courts-Martial (10 U.S.C. § 823: article 23, UCMJ), and Summary Courts-Martial (10 U.S.C. § 824: article 24 UCMJ). The others are the president, secretary of the Army, secretary of the Navy, secretary of the Air Force, and secretary of homeland security (when the United States Coast Guard is under the United States Department of Homeland Security and has not been transferred to the Department of the Navy under the Department of Defense).

== Salary ==
The secretary of defense is a Level I position in the Executive Schedule, thus earning a salary of US$246,400, as of October 2024.

== List of secretaries of defense ==
The longest-serving secretary of defense is Robert McNamara, who served for a total of 7 years, 39 days. Combining his two non-sequential services as the secretary of defense, the second-longest serving is Donald Rumsfeld, who served just ten days fewer than McNamara. The second-longest unbroken tenure was Caspar Weinberger's, at 6 years, 306 days.

The shortest-serving secretary of defense is Elliot Richardson, who served 114 days and then was appointed U.S. attorney general amid the resignations of the Watergate Scandal (this is not counting deputy secretaries of defense William P. Clements and William Howard Taft IV, who each served a few weeks as temporary/acting secretary of defense).

For precursors to this position before the establishment of the Department of Defense, see the lists of secretaries of the Navy and secretaries of war before 1947.

Parties

Democratic Republican Independent / Unknown

Status

Denotes an acting secretary of defense

No.	Image	Name	Start	End	Duration	Party	Home State	President(s)
1		James Forrestal	17 September 1947	28 March 1949	1 year, 192 days	Democratic	New York	Harry S. Truman (1945–1953)
2		Louis A. Johnson	28 March 1949	19 September 1950	1 year, 175 days	Democratic	West Virginia	Harry S. Truman (1945–1953)
3		George C. Marshall	21 September 1950	12 September 1951	356 days	Independent	Pennsylvania	Harry S. Truman (1945–1953)
4		Robert A. Lovett	17 September 1951	20 January 1953	1 year, 125 days	Republican (cross party)	New York	Harry S. Truman (1945–1953)
5		Charles Erwin Wilson	28 January 1953	8 October 1957	4 years, 253 days	Republican	Michigan	Dwight D. Eisenhower (1953–1961)
6		Neil H. McElroy	9 October 1957	1 December 1959	2 years, 53 days	Republican	Ohio	Dwight D. Eisenhower (1953–1961)
7		Thomas S. Gates Jr.	2 December 1959	20 January 1961	1 year, 49 days	Republican	Pennsylvania	Dwight D. Eisenhower (1953–1961)
8		Robert McNamara	21 January 1961	29 February 1968	7 years, 39 days	Republican (cross party)	Michigan	John F. Kennedy (1961–1963)
8		Robert McNamara	21 January 1961	29 February 1968	7 years, 39 days	Republican (cross party)	Michigan	Lyndon B. Johnson (1963–1969)
9		Clark Clifford	1 March 1968	20 January 1969	325 days	Democratic	Maryland	Lyndon B. Johnson (1963–1969)
10		Melvin Laird	22 January 1969	29 January 1973	4 years, 7 days	Republican	Wisconsin	Richard Nixon (1969–1974)
11		Elliot Richardson	30 January 1973	24 May 1973	114 days	Republican	Massachusetts	Richard Nixon (1969–1974)
–		Bill Clements; Acting	24 May 1973	2 July 1973	39 days	Republican	Texas	Richard Nixon (1969–1974)
12		James R. Schlesinger	2 July 1973	19 November 1975	2 years, 140 days	Republican	Virginia	Richard Nixon (1969–1974)
12		James R. Schlesinger	2 July 1973	19 November 1975	2 years, 140 days	Republican	Virginia	Gerald Ford (1974–1977)
13		Donald Rumsfeld	20 November 1975	20 January 1977	1 year, 61 days	Republican	Illinois	Gerald Ford (1974–1977)
14		Harold Brown	20 January 1977	20 January 1981	4 years, 0 days	Democratic	California	Jimmy Carter (1977–1981)
15		Caspar Weinberger	21 January 1981	23 November 1987	6 years, 306 days	Republican	California	Ronald Reagan (1981–1989)
16		Frank Carlucci	23 November 1987	20 January 1989	1 year, 58 days	Republican	Virginia	Ronald Reagan (1981–1989)
–		William Howard Taft IV; Acting	20 January 1989	21 March 1989	60 days	Republican	Ohio	George H. W. Bush (1989–1993)
17		Dick Cheney	21 March 1989	20 January 1993	3 years, 305 days	Republican	Wyoming	George H. W. Bush (1989–1993)
18		Les Aspin	20 January 1993	3 February 1994	1 year, 14 days	Democratic	Wisconsin	Bill Clinton (1993–2001)
19		William Perry	3 February 1994	24 January 1997	2 years, 356 days	Democratic	Pennsylvania	Bill Clinton (1993–2001)
20		William Cohen	24 January 1997	20 January 2001	3 years, 362 days	Republican (cross party)	Maine	Bill Clinton (1993–2001)
21		Donald Rumsfeld	20 January 2001	18 December 2006	5 years, 332 days (7 years, 29 days total)	Republican	Illinois	George W. Bush (2001–2009)
22		Robert Gates	18 December 2006	30 June 2011	4 years, 194 days	Republican (cross party)	Texas	George W. Bush (2001–2009)
22		Robert Gates	18 December 2006	30 June 2011	4 years, 194 days	Republican (cross party)	Texas	Barack Obama (2009–2017)
23		Leon Panetta	1 July 2011	26 February 2013	1 year, 240 days	Democratic	California	Barack Obama (2009–2017)
24		Chuck Hagel	27 February 2013	17 February 2015	1 year, 355 days	Republican (cross party)	Nebraska	Barack Obama (2009–2017)
25		Ash Carter	17 February 2015	20 January 2017	1 year, 338 days	Democratic	Massachusetts	Barack Obama (2009–2017)
26		Jim Mattis	20 January 2017	1 January 2019	1 year, 345 days	Independent	Washington	Donald Trump (2017–2021)
–		Patrick M. Shanahan; Acting	1 January 2019	23 June 2019	173 days	Independent	Washington	Donald Trump (2017–2021)
–		Mark Esper; Acting	24 June 2019	15 July 2019	21 days	Republican	Virginia	Donald Trump (2017–2021)
–		Richard V. Spencer; Acting	15 July 2019	23 July 2019	8 days	Republican	Wyoming	Donald Trump (2017–2021)
27		Mark Esper	23 July 2019	9 November 2020	1 year, 109 days	Republican	Virginia	Donald Trump (2017–2021)
–		Christopher C. Miller; Acting	9 November 2020	20 January 2021	72 days	Republican	Iowa	Donald Trump (2017–2021)
–		David Norquist; Acting	20 January 2021	22 January 2021	2 days	Republican	Massachusetts	Joe Biden (2021–2025)
28		Lloyd Austin	22 January 2021	20 January 2025	3 years, 364 days	Independent	Georgia	Joe Biden (2021–2025)
–		Robert G. Salesses; Acting	20 January 2025	25 January 2025	5 days	Independent	Rhode Island	Donald Trump (2025–present)
29		Pete Hegseth	25 January 2025	Incumbent	1 year, 292 days	Republican	Minnesota	Donald Trump (2025–present)

== Succession ==
=== Presidential succession ===
The secretary of defense is sixth in the presidential line of succession, after the secretary of the treasury and before the attorney general.

=== Secretary succession ===
On 10 December 2020, President Donald Trump modified the order of succession for the office of Secretary of Defense in Executive Order 13963. The order of succession is:

#	Office
1	Deputy Secretary of Defense
2*	Secretary of the Army; Secretary of the Navy; Secretary of the Air Force
3	Under Secretary of Defense for Policy
4	Under Secretary of Defense for Intelligence and Security
-	Chief Management Officer of the Department of Defense**
5	Under Secretary of Defense for Acquisition and Sustainment
6	Under Secretary of Defense for Research and Engineering
7	Under Secretary of Defense (Comptroller)
8	Under Secretary of Defense for Personnel and Readiness
9	Deputy Under Secretary of Defense for Policy
10	Deputy Under Secretary of Defense for Intelligence and Security
11	Deputy Under Secretary of Defense for Acquisition and Sustainment
12	Deputy Under Secretary of Defense for Research and Engineering
13	Deputy Under Secretary of Defense (Comptroller)
14	Deputy Under Secretary of Defense for Personnel and Readiness
15*	General Counsel of the Department of Defense; Assistant Secretaries of Defense; Director of Cost Assessment and Program Evaluation; Director of Operational Test and Evaluation; Chief Information Officer of the Department of Defense
16*	Under Secretary of the Army; Under Secretary of the Navy; Under Secretary of the Air Force
17*	Assistant Secretaries of the Army; Assistant Secretaries of the Navy; Assistant Secretaries of the Air Force; General Counsel of the Army; General Counsel of the Navy; General Counsel of the Air Force
	*Order of Succession is determined by the seniority of officials in their role. (Note: According to the Executive Order precedence states – in layman's terms – that appointees designated the same succession number are determined by the order in which the date they were appointed (senate confirmed) to their position. However appointees designated the same succession number and have the same appointment (senate confirmed) date shall be determined by the order in which they have taken the oath to serve in that office.)
	**Office dissolved on 1 January 2021. (Note: Congress disestablished the CMO position with the passage of the William M. (Mac) Thornberry National Defense Authorization Act for Fiscal Year 2021 effective 1 January 2021.)

== See also ==
- Base Realignment and Closure Commission
- Boeing E-4 – US Air Force airborne command squadron aircraft
- Challenge coin – Coin or medallion bearing an organization's insignia or emblem
- Combat Exclusion Policy – 1948–2013 US Armed Forces policy
- Commission to Assess the Ballistic Missile Threat to the United States – 1998 commission created by US Congress
- CONPLAN 8022-02 – Reported US Strategic Command contingency plan
- Continuity of Operations Plan
- Defense Policy Board Advisory Committee – US government organization
- Defense Support of Civil authorities – American perspective on armed forces bringing order and peace domestically
- Department of Defense Directive 2310 – United States national security policy
- Designated survivor – Individual in the presidential line of succession
- Emergency Action Message – Nuclear weapon control system
- Global Command and Control System – U.S. military decision support system
- Gold Codes – Nuclear weapon launch codes for the US president
- Hamdan v. Rumsfeld – 2006 U.S. Supreme Court case
- Joint Worldwide Intelligence Communications System – US military intranet system
- Key West Agreement – US Department of Defense policy
- McCarran Internal Security Act – 1950 US anti-communist subversion statute
- Military Commissions Act of 2006 – Former United States law
- Military operation plan – List of actions an armed force intends to carry out to achieve combat goals
- National Command Authority (United States) – American ultimate source of military orders
- National Industrial Security Program – US government program
- National Security Strategy (United States) – Document issued periodically by the United States government
- Office of the Secretary of Defense Identification Badge – US military badge
- Packard Commission – 1986 American report on military management
- Permissive Action Link – Access control device for nuclear weapons
- Presidential Successor Support System – United States continuity of government program
- Quadrennial Defense Review – Former United States master plan for military and counterterrorism contingency
- Rules of engagement – Internal limits, authorizations and directives on use of force in combat
- Secretary of Defense Employer Support Freedom Award – United States government award
- Single Integrated Operational Plan – 1961–2003 US nuclear strategy document
- State secrets privilege – Evidentiary rule in the US
- Stop-loss policy – US military service extension policy
- Two-man rule – Action only authorized by two or more people
- Unconventional warfare – United States military doctrine
- United States Foreign Military Financing – US federal government program
- US Commission on National Security/21st Century – Security commission

U.S. order of precedence (ceremonial)
Preceded by Scott Bessent as Secretary of the Treasury	Order of precedence of the United States as Secretary of Defense	Succeeded by Todd Blanche as Attorney General
U.S. presidential line of succession
Preceded by Secretary of the Treasury; Scott Bessent	6th in line	Succeeded by Attorney General; Todd Blanche
