= Harold Hering =

Officer in the United States Air Force

Harold L. Hering
- Born: Harold Lewis Hering; February 1, 1936 (age 90); Olney, Illinois, U.S.
- Military career
- Allegiance: United States of America
- Branch: United States Air Force
- Service years: 1955–1975
- Rank: Major
- Service number: AF 16492089; AO 3080482
- Unit: Air Rescue Service
- Commands: ATC (Air Training Command); SAC (Strategic Air Command); MAC (Military Airlift Command)
- Conflicts: Vietnam War
- Awards: Distinguished Flying Cross; Bronze Star Medal; Air Medal; Air Force Commendation Medal

Harold L. Hering (born February 1, 1936) is a former officer of the United States Air Force, who was discharged in 1975 for requesting basic information about checks and balances to prevent the carrying out of unauthorized orders to launch nuclear missiles. Hering was subsequently presented the 2017 Courage of Conscience Award at the Peace Abbey, Boston, Massachusetts.

== Career ==
Hering served six tours of duty in Vietnam and elsewhere in Southeast Asia. Hering received the Distinguished Flying Cross, Bronze Star Medal, and Air Medal with eight Oak leaf clusters for his work in Vietnam flying helicopters.

=== Discharge ===
Hering served in the Vietnam War as part of the Air Rescue Service. Twenty-one years into his Air Force career, while serving as a Minuteman missile crewman and expecting a promotion to Lieutenant Colonel, he posed the following question during training at Vandenberg Air Force Base in late 1973, at a time when Richard Nixon was president:

How can I know that an order I receive to launch my missiles came from a sane president?

The Single Integrated Operational Plan (SIOP) specifies that, when the National Command Authority (NCA) issues an order to use nuclear weapons, the order will filter down the chain of command. Per the SIOP, decision-making is the responsibility of the NCA, not of officers lower in the chain of command, who are responsible for executing NCA decisions. To ensure no opportunity for execution by a rogue operator, the two-man rule requires that at each stage, two operators independently verify and agree that the order is valid. In the case of the Minuteman missile, this is done by comparing the authorization code in the launch order against the code in the Sealed Authenticator, a special sealed envelope which holds the code; if both operators agree that the code matches, the launch must be executed.

In 1978, journalist Ron Rosenbaum wrote a 15,000-word article in Harper's Magazine about the nuclear command and control system in which he publicized the case of Hering. Rosenbaum later wrote that Hering's question exposed a flaw in the very foundation of this doctrine, and asked "What if [the president's] mind is deranged, disordered, even damagingly intoxicated? ... Can he launch despite displaying symptoms of imbalance? Is there anything to stop him?" Rosenbaum says that the answer is that launch would indeed be possible: to this day, the nuclear fail-safe protocols for executing commands are entirely concerned with the president's identity, not their sanity. The president alone authorizes a nuclear launch and the two-man rule does not apply.

Hering was pulled from training and, unable to receive a reply to his satisfaction, requested reassignment to different duties. Instead, the Air Force issued an administrative discharge for "failure to demonstrate acceptable qualities of leadership". Hering appealed the discharge, and at the Air Force Board of Inquiry, the Air Force stated that knowing whether or not a launch order is lawful is beyond the executing officer's need to know. Hering replied:

I have to say, I feel I do have a need to know, because I am a human being. It is inherent in an officer's commission that he has to do what is right in terms of the needs of the nation despite any orders to the contrary. You really don't know at the time of key turning, whether you are complying with your oath of office.

The Board of Inquiry ruled that Hering be discharged from the Air Force. After his discharge, Hering became at first a long-haul trucker, and then a counselor.

=== Media ===
In 2017, Hering was profiled in the Radiolab episode "Nukes". In the episode he rejected the characterization by General Russell E. Dougherty of his statements.

According to General Dougherty, Hering had always qualified or hedged his assertions that he would turn keys to launch the nuclear missiles, if he was ordered to. Dougherty claims Hering gave subjective conditions for following such an order, expressing his own judgment of the validity of the order.

Hering insists, on the contrary, that he had always expressed a commitment to follow orders. However he would have followed the order with a conflicted conscience, if he was not informed about the checks and balances of presidential decision making, which Hering assumed had to exist. He said, "I think it's an affront to play the game of "you don't have the 'need to know'", for someone who's doing one of the most serious, grave jobs that there is in the armed forces."
