= CONPLAN 8022-02 =

Reported US Strategic Command contingency plan

According to The Washington Post, the United States Strategic Command contingency plan for dealing with "imminent" threats is formally known as CONPLAN 8022-02. The plan was reportedly completed in November 2003, resulting in a preemptive and offensive strike capability. The main plan involves the preemptive use of tactical nuclear strikes (mini-nukes) on deep-ground rocket/bomb installations, computer viruses, and radar disruption technology.

See: Single Integrated Operational Plan for origins and details.
