= List of After Words interviews first aired in 2015 =

After Words is an American television series on the C-SPAN2 network’s weekend programming schedule known as Book TV. The program is an hour-long talk show, each week featuring an interview with the author of a new nonfiction book. The program has no regular host. Instead, each author is paired with a guest host who is familiar with the author or the subject matter of their book.

First air date (Links to video)	Interviewee(s)	Interviewer(s)	Book	Topic of interview / Comments
January 3, 2015	Chuck Todd	Dan Balz	The Stranger: Barack Obama in the White House	Presidency of Barack Obama
January 10, 2015	Cass Sunstein	Susan Cain	Wiser: Getting Beyond Groupthink to Make Groups Smarter	Group decision-making
January 17, 2015	Bret Stephens	Bob Minzesheimer	America in Retreat	Foreign policy of the United States
January 24, 2015	Mike Huckabee	S. E. Cupp	God, Guns, Grits, and Gravy	
January 31, 2015	April Ryan	Ann Compton	The Presidency in Black and White: My Up-Close View of Three Presidents and Race in America	
February 7, 2015	Toby Harnden	Dan Lamothe	Dead Men Risen: An Epic Story of War and Heroism in Afghanistan	
February 14, 2015	David Axelrod	David Frum	Believer: My Forty Years in Politics	
February 21, 2015	Wes Moore	Wendy Spencer	The Work: My Search for a Life That Matters	
February 28, 2015	Allan Ryskind	Tucker Carlson	Hollywood Traitors: Blacklisted Screenwriters - Agents of Stalin, Allies of Hitler	
March 7, 2015	David Morris	Kayla Williams	The Evil Hours: A Biography of Post-Traumatic Stress Disorder	Posttraumatic stress disorder
March 14, 2015	William Bennett	Jonah Goldberg	Going to Pot: Why the Rush to Legalize Marijuana is Harming America	Cannabis in the United States
March 21, 2015	Eric Foner	Edna Greene Medford	Gateway to Freedom: The Hidden History of the Underground Railroad	The Underground Railroad
March 28, 2015	Peter Wallison	Sudeep Reddy	Hidden in Plain Sight: What Really Caused the World's Worst Financial Crisis and Why It Could Happen Again	
April 4, 2015	Cornel West	Khalil Gibran Muhammad	The Radical King	Martin Luther King Jr.
April 11, 2015	Grover Norquist	Stan Veuger	End the IRS Before It Ends Us: How to Restore a Low Tax, High Growth, Wealthy America	Internal Revenue Service
April 18, 2015	Elaine Lowry Brye	Patricia Kime	Be Safe, Love Mom: A Military Mom’s Stories of Courage, Comfort, and Surviving Life on the Homefront	
April 25, 2015	Colman McCarthy	Medea Benjamin	Teaching Peace	
May 2, 2015	Peter Slevin	Cassandra Clayton	Michelle Obama: A Life	Michelle Obama
May 9, 2015	Jon Krakauer	Katie Baker	Missoula: Rape and the Justice System in a College Town	
May 16, 2015	Caroline Fredrickson	Sabrina Schaeffer	Under the Bus: How Working Women are Being Run Over	
May 23, 2015	Rosabeth Moss Kanter	Rodney Slater	Move: Putting America’s Infrastructure Back in the Lead	Transportation in the United States
May 30, 2015	Kenji Yoshino	David Savage	Speak Now: Marriage Equality on Trial	Hollingsworth v. Perry
June 6, 2015	Joseph Stiglitz	Heather McGhee	The Great Divide: Unequal Societies and What We Can Do About Them	
June 13, 2015	Kirsten Powers	Sharyl Attkisson	The Silencing: How the Left is Killing Free Speech	
June 20, 2015	Mona Eltahawy	Rangita de Silva de Alwis	Headscarves and Hymens: Why the Middle East Needs A Sexual Revolution	
June 27, 2015	Nelson Denis	Teresite Levy	War Against All Puerto Ricans	
July 4, 2015	Carol Berkin	Maeva Marcus	The Bill of Rights: The Fight to Secure America's Liberties	The U.S. Bill of Rights
July 11, 2015	Charles Shields	Neely Tucker	Mockingbird	Harper Lee
July 18, 2015	Andrea Mays	Jeffery Deaver	The Millionaire and the Bard	Henry Clay Folger, Shakespeare's First Folio
July 25, 2015	Ralph Nader	Andy Shallal	Return to Sender	
August 1, 2015	Michael Tanner	Maya MacGuineas	Going for Broke: Deficits, Debt, and the Entitlement Crisis	
August 8, 2015	Charles Murray	Jared Bernstein	By the People: Rebuilding Liberty Without Permission	
August 15, 2015	Claire McCaskill	Susan Glasser	Plenty Ladylike	
August 22, 2015	Arthur Brooks	Michael Steele	The Conservative Heart: How to Build a Fairer, Happier and More Prosperous America	
August 29, 2015	Dan-el Padilla Peralta	Liz Robbins	Undocumented: A Dominican Boy’s Odyssey from a Homeless Shelter to the Ivy League	
September 5, 2015	Kathryn Edin	Gwen Moore	$2.00 a Day: Living on Almost Nothing in America	
September 12, 2015	Amy Klobuchar	Susan Page	The Senator Next Door: A Memoir from the Heartland	
September 19, 2015	Joy-Ann Reid	Michael Higginbotham	Fracture: Barack Obama, The Clintons, and the Racial Divide	
September 26, 2015	Bill O'Reilly	Bay Buchanan	Killing Reagan: The Violent Assault That Changed a Presidency	Attempted assassination of Ronald Reagan
October 3, 2015	Martha Kumar	Mack McLarty	Before the Oath: How George W. Bush and Barack Obama Managed a Transfer of Power	
October 10, 2015	David Gregory	Sally Quinn	How's Your Faith? An Unlikely Spiritual Journey	
October 17, 2015	Bethany McLean	Joe Light	Shaky Ground: The Strange Saga of the U.S. Mortgage Giants	Fannie Mae and Freddie Mac
October 24, 2015	John Danforth	Tim Hutchinson	The Relevance of Religion	
October 31, 2015	Sean Naylor	Dana Priest	Relentless Strike: The Secret History of Joint Special Operations Command	Joint Special Operations Command
November 7, 2015	Ben Bernanke	Sherrod Brown	The Courage to Act	
November 14, 2015	Patrick Kennedy	Jim McDermott	A Common Struggle: A Personal Journey Through the Past and Future of Mental Illness and Addiction	
November 21, 2015	Niall Ferguson	Carla Anne Robbins	Kissinger, 1923-1968: The Idealist	Henry Kissinger
November 28, 2015	Roberta Kaplan	Zoe Tillman	Then Comes Marriage: United States v. Windsor and the Defeat of DOMA	United States v. Windsor
December 5, 2015	Gilbert M. Gaul	Tom McMillen	Billion-Dollar Ball	
December 12, 2015	Theresa Brown	Debra Hatmaker	The Shift: One Nurse, Twelve Hours, Four Patients' Lives	
December 19, 2015	Sir Michael Marmot	Christine Sow	The Health Gap: The Challenge of an Unequal World	
December 26, 2015	Darcy Olsen	Kimberly Leonard	The Right to Try: How the Federal Government Prevents Americans from Getting the Lifesaving Treatments They Need	
