= Presidential transition of George W. Bush =

Transfer of presidential power from Bill Clinton to George W. Bush

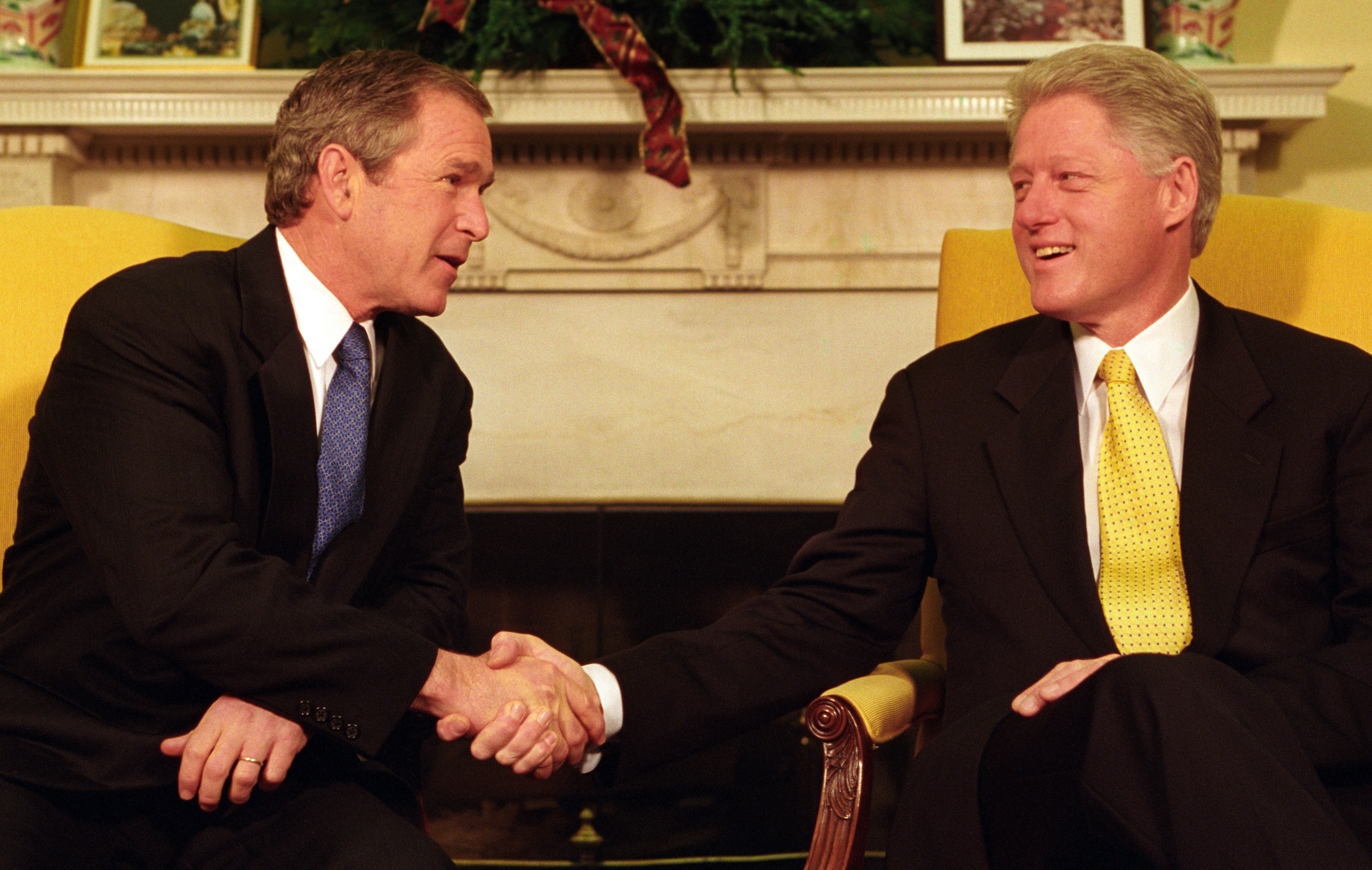
- President Bill Clinton (right) meeting with President-elect George W. Bush (left) in the Oval Office of the White House on December 19, 2000.
- Election date: November 7, 2000
- Transition start: December 12, 2000
- Inauguration date: January 20, 2001
- President-elect: George W. Bush (Republican)
- Vice president-elect: Dick Cheney (Republican)
- Outgoing president: Bill Clinton (Democrat)
- Outgoing vice president: Al Gore (Democrat)
- Headquarters: McLean, Virginia
- Chairman of the transition: Dick Cheney

The presidential transition of George W. Bush took place following the 2000 United States presidential election. It started after Bush was declared the victor of the election on December 12, 2000, when the Bush v. Gore decision by the Supreme Court halted the election recount in Florida, making Bush the victor in that state. The decision delivered him the state's 25 electoral votes, thus giving him a total of 271 electoral votes. This was one more vote than the 270 needed to win the presidency outright, making him president-elect.

Due to the recount effort and litigation between Bush and his presidential opponent Al Gore leaving the outcome of the election unclear until December 12, 2000, Bush's official transition was abbreviated, at just 39 days. The transition was chaired by vice president-elect Dick Cheney.

Bush's victory was formally certified on January 6, 2001, when a joint session of Congress certified the electoral college count. The transition ended when Bush was inaugurated on January 20, 2001. This was the first presidential transition to be held after the passage of the Presidential Transition Act of 2000.

== Abbreviated nature of official transition period ==
Due to the recount effort and litigation between Bush and his presidential opponent Al Gore leaving the election undecided until December 12, 2000, Bush's official transition was abbreviated to just 39 days. The last instance in United States history in which disputes over the election had delayed an individual becoming president-elect of the United States was the after the 1876 United States presidential election, when Rutherford B. Hayes would not become president-elect until after the Electoral Commission's decision.

The official transition's abbreviated length gave the Bush team less time to prepare.

The shortened transition was also seen as having a potential impact on Bush's ability to readily make appointments to offices. The shortened transition meant that there was only a 5-week period before Bush would take office as president for requisite FBI background checks to be performed on many of his prospective appointees for offices which required one. Despite having such a short transition, in his first year as president, Bush managed to appoint more people than any other modern president had in the same timeframe. The 9/11 Commission Report argued that the abbreviated transition had resultantly left many national security positions unfilled by the time of the September 11 attacks, and that slow transitions such as that of Bush's can imperil the nation's national security.

== Transition team ==
Transition team
Position	Holder	Date publicly named to position	Previous experience
Chairman	Dick Cheney	November 26, 2000	Vice-presidential running-mate of Bush; former United States Secretary of Defense
Executive Director	Clay Johnson III	November 27, 2000	Gubernatorial chief of staff to George W. Bush since June 1999
Spokesperson	Ari Fleischer	November 27, 2000	Spokesman for Bush campaign since November 1999
Deputy Spokesperson	Juleanna Glover Weiss	November 27, 2000	Press secretary to Dick Cheney during campaign
Legal Counsel	Michael E. Toner	November 29, 2000	General counsel for the Bush campaign since March 1999
Director of Congressional Relations	David Gribben	November 29, 2000	Vice president for corporate affairs at Halliburton

The transition Bush team also announced policy coordination groups on December 15, which included such members Joshua Bolten, Gary Edson, John Bridgeland. The same day it also announced advisory teams, of which Bill Paxon was chair and Maria Cino was executive director.

Fred F. Fielding headed the transition's vetting and clearance process for prospective appointees.

The transition team also had a clearance counsel, confirmation teams, and various coordinator positions.

== Pre-election activities ==
Some planning for Bush's potential presidential transition began as early as the spring of 1999. Per the later recounting of Clay Johnson III, Bush had asked him in June 1999 to help prepare a plan for a potential presidential transition. Johnson would agree, and would lead Bush's pre-election transition planning. Formal planning for a prospective transition began in August 2000. Throughout the pre-election planning efforts, Johnson would hold occasional meetings with Bush. While Johnson would continue to head pre-election planning, shortly after the Republican National Convention, it was decided that Bush's running mate, Dick Cheney would be the post-election transition chairman if the ticket were elected. The work Johnson oversaw was almost entirely done out of the public-eye, with little media coverage paid to the pre-election transition work until shortly before the day of the election.

Jonson communicated with Martha Joynt Kumar, head of the nonpartisan "White House Transition Project" group founded in 1999, who were researching presidential transitions. Johnson would later talk about receiving helpful insight from their research, and Bush would also credit them with having aided his transition effort.

A decision that Bush had privately decided upon two weeks before the election was that, if elected, he would name Andrew Card his White House chief of staff. This decision was made early due to Johnson's belief that it would be beneficial to have an individual in place for this role early.

== Initial post-election day activities ==
While the election took place on November 7, its winner was unclear due to the unsettled result in Florida.

Bush proceeded with transition efforts while the election result was yet to be formally determined. In contrast to Bush, for some time after election day, Al Gore suspended his transition team's operations. Dick Cheney, conducted some transition work out of a private residence he owned in McLean, Virginia.

Throughout the post-election recount and litigation, as prospective president and vice president, Bush and Cheney retained United States Secret Service protection they had already been receiving before the election, as did Gore's vice presidential runningmate Joe Lieberman (Gore, as the incumbent vice president, was entitled to Secret Service protection at the time, regardless of the presidential election).

Gore had paused his transition efforts, and had involved himself with his team's efforts in addressing the recount in Florida. Contrarily, Bush would largely remain personally removed from his team's operations in Florida, and would instead busy himself with both transition planning tasks and actions related to his job as governor of Texas.

Bush began to conduct his transition in a manner strongly mimicking a president-elect after Florida Secretary of State Katherine Harris certified her state's results on November 26 (an act that did not settle the result of the election, as Gore launched the Gore v. Harris lawsuit that would later evolve into Bush v. Gore). Operating his transition effort in a public manner was seen to be, in part, a part of the Bush team's strategy to turn public opinion against Al Gore's contesting of the Florida election results, and to pressure Gore into dropping his legal challenge. Bush hoped to establish a perception that his victory was imminent, and would leak word of his national security team, and allow news cameras access to some of his transition meetings. Bush received criticism, particularly from Democrats, for operating such a full-fledged transition before the election outcome was officially determined. However, many Democrats conceded that it was a necessity for Bush to plan a transition so that he would be prepared to take office if he were to be determined the election's victor. Bush held meetings with many prospective appointees. Bush held some of these meetings at his ranch in Texas.

On November 26, Bush announced that Dick Cheney would be officially heading the transition. Cheney took on this work, despite having suffered a heart attack earlier that month. It was reported around this time that Bush had delegated to Cheney significant authority over deciding the composition and management style of the potential Bush administration. The choice to have the vice presidential running mate head the transition team, an unusual move, ultimately foreshadowed the central role Cheney would make in policy decisions during Bush's presidency. Cheney formed a transition team that primarily consisted of individuals that he had preexisting relationships with and many who had been on Cheney's own staff when he was United States Secretary of Defense. In addition to this, Cheney named Clay Johnson III (Bush's gubernatorial chief of staff) as the executive director of the transition. Cheney also named Ari Fleischer, who had been a spokesman for the campaign, as the transition's press spokesman. On November 29, it was announced that Michael E. Toner would be joining the transition team as legal counsel, and that David Gribben would serve as director of congressional relations. By the time the election outcome would be decided, Bush's transition team already consisted of 75 employees and 20 volunteers.

On November 27, the General Services Administration (GSA), led by David J. Barram, stated they would not give the Bush transition team access to government-provided transition office space or $5.3 million in earmarked funding for a transition, "until a final winner" was determined in the presidential election, citing the Presidential Transition Act of 1963's provision requiring the outcome of an election to be clear prior to the government providing any taxpayer funding to aid in a transition. On November 28, Barram announced to staffers of the GSA that he would postpone his planned resignation by two weeks, from November 29 to December 15, so that he could be in office when the office ceded these to an incoming president.

In response to the GSA's decision not to give the Bush transition team access to government office space and funding, Cheney announced on December 27 that the transition team would open a privately funded office in Washington, D.C., and would, to fund their transition effort, establish a nonprofit organization that would accept direct and in-kind, contributions from individuals of up to a maximum of $5,000 per individual, which was the maximum contribution allowed under the Presidential Transition Act of 1963. The Bush transition effort opted to refuse corporate and PAC donations. The Bush camp targeted raising $3.5 million for their transition effort. The Bush transition effort would ultimately raise $1.5 million in funding through contributions by the time the election outcome was determined. It was not unprecedented for a presidential transition to raise private funds, as the previous 1992–1993 Clinton transition had raised $5.3 million to supplement the $3.5 million the federal government had provided it. The Bush team also pledged to voluntarily disclose contributions. However, the choice to raise private funds attracted some criticism, with the group Common Cause urging the Bush team not to continue with their plans to do so. While each saying it was problematic for them to raise private contributions, both OpenSecrets director Larry Makinson and political scientist Larry Sabato conceded that the lack of federal funding for the transition had left the Bush team with little other choice.

On November 29, Cheney publicly announced the transition team's acquisition of office space near Washington, D.C. in suburban McLean, Virginia. The Bush transition moved into the 2,100 square feet of office space the following day. At this time, the transition effort began expanding its staff.

Incumbent president Bill Clinton denied any involvement in the GSA's decision to withhold funding from the Bush transition effort. Some sources, however, alleged that, despite Clinton's denial, he was involved to some degree in the refusal of the GSA to not give the Bush team access to office space and funding, arguing that Clinton may have been acting on grudges stemming from his own transition, where his own team felt that the outgoing president, Bush's father George H. W. Bush, was not helpful to them. Clinton publicly declared that he would prefer that the government, instead, provide funding both to the Bush and Gore transition efforts. The United States Department of Justice investigated whether the Presidential Transition Act of 1963 could be interpreted as allowing this. However, on November 28, the Department of Justice reached the conclusion that the law did not allow the funds to be used to aid "multiple transition teams". The Clinton administration would, ultimately, attempt to act as though two different presidential transitions were taking place. At the same time that Bush was ramping up his transition efforts in late November, Gore began going forth with a transition effort of his own, headed by Roy Neel. A number of moves were announced by the White House on November 28. Clinton had the CIA begin giving classified daily intelligence briefings to Bush and Cheney (Al Gore was already a recipient of such briefings, as he was the incumbent vice president), with the White House announcing it November 28. The White House also announced on November 28 that it was offering to meet with both Bush's and Gore's transition directors, which the Bush team quickly accepted. The White House also announced on November 28 that they had requested for the Department of Justice to investigate whether the FBI could begin conducting background checks for each team's prospective nominees. This wound up receiving clearance later that week, and the FBI would begin conducting background check's for each team's prospective nominees. The White House asked Clinton's appointees to tender their resignations at the end of Clinton's term, to make room for a new administration's appointees, sending letters requesting resignations to roughly 3,000 Clinton appointees. John Podesta, Clinton's White House Chief of Staff, ordered each executive branch department to create briefing books for the incoming cabinet secretaries, and to set-aside workspaces for the president-elect, once determined, to have their team utilize during their official transition. The GSA began consulting with the transition about how they preferred to see them outfit the taxpayer-funded office space, but continued to hold-off on providing such space to either transition effort while the election litigation was still pending.

Not only were federal agencies' normal handling for a transition of planning thrown-off by their being two potential contenders for the presidency so far after an election, but so were those responsible with planning aspects of the presidential inauguration. With the election being in limbo, neither Bush nor Gore had formed an inaugural committee to plan for their prospective inaugurations. Organizations such as the Armed Forces Inaugural Committee were forced to create contingency plans to help the eventual president-elect plan their inauguration at a faster-than-typical pace.

Prior to the election outcome being determined, the Bush transition team had already received 18,000 resumes for positions which Bush would have had the authority to make appointments to if he became president. Some resumes had been submitted through the internet. The next president would have 1,125 Senate confirmable posts and 5,000 other posts to fill. Some designees were named for certain positions. For example, on November 22, Bush announced that Andrew Card was his choice to serve as White House Chief of Staff. Others announced in this period included the selection of Colin Powell as Secretary of State and Condoleezza Rice as National Security Advisor. However, many potential nominees Bush's team had been courting the strongest had proven reluctant to submit themselves to the level of scrutiny of federal background checks before Bush was declared president-elect.

In late November, Bush and his top associates began making phone calls to Republican congressional leaders, and indirect communication with Democratic leadership, in hopes of laying the ground for bipartisan cooperation on legislation if he became president.

By early December, a number of congressional Republicans, such as Fred Thompson, Steve Horn, and Jim Kolbe, had written to GSA head Barram to urge him to release funding and grant access to office space to the Bush transition team. Soon after, Horn, as chairman of the House Government Reform Subcommittee on Government Management, Information and Technology, began holding congressional hearings on the matter, and Republican congressman Spencer Bachus introduced a bill that would require the GSA to provide support to the Bush transition team.

== Official transition ==
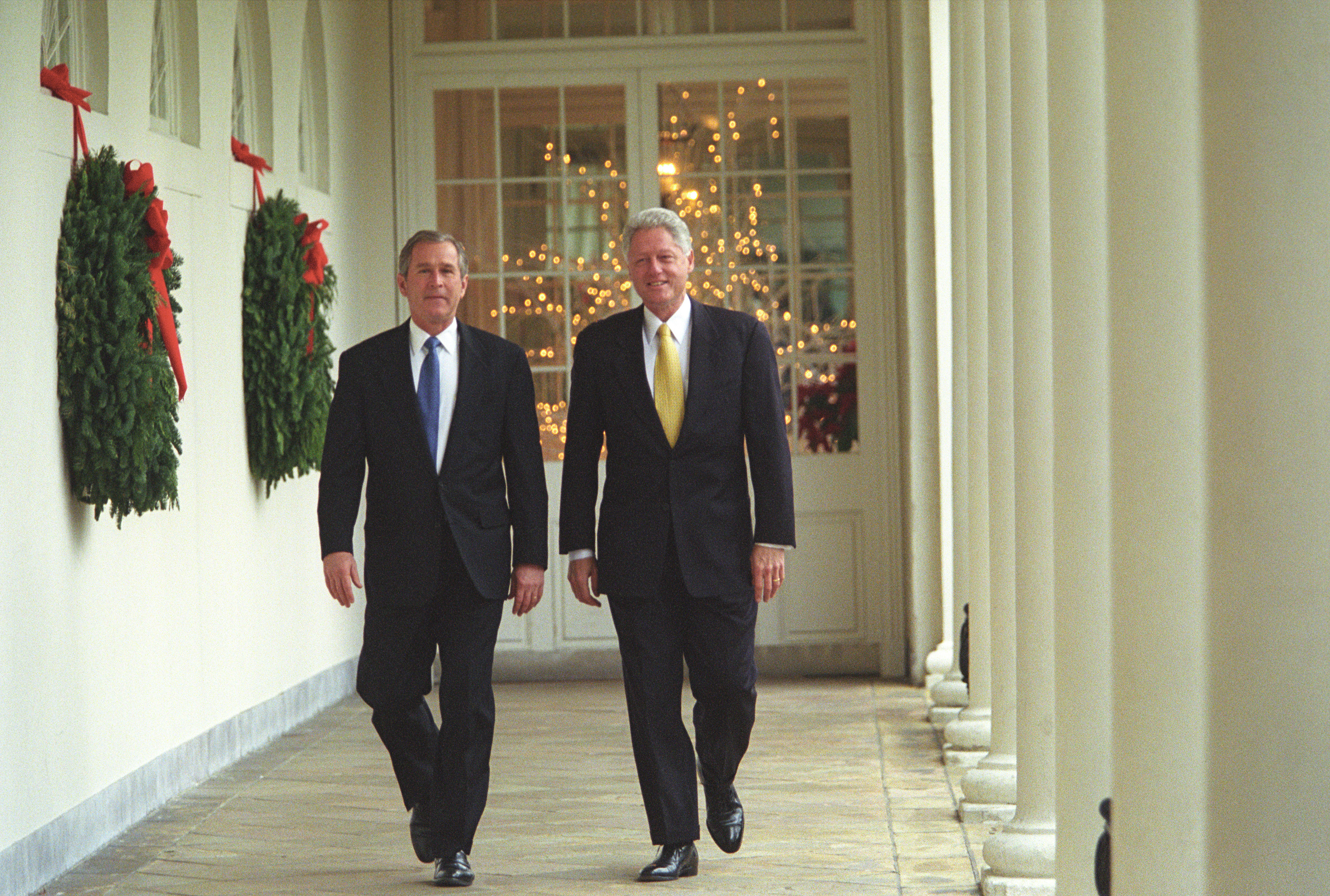
President-elect Bush walking with President Clinton during their December 19 meeting

Bush became the president-elect of the United States on December 12. Gore formally conceded on December 13. On December 14, Bush's transition team was given access by the GSA to three floors of workspace (totaling 90,000 square feet) in downtown Washington, D.C. and $5.2 million in presidential transition funds. GSA funding had also been allotted to aid the Clinton White House with their role in the transition. The Bush effort continued to raise millions in private contributions even after receiving GSA funding.

The day after the Supreme Court decision, Vice President-elect Cheney held meetings with five politically moderate Republican U.S. senators, and held meetings with other Republican lawmakers in Washington, D.C.

Bush met with numerous prospective Cabinet nominees throughout the month of December. He proceeded quickly, after becoming president-elect, to announce Cabinet selections. By December 24, he had already named 6 out of 14 Cabinet secretaries, and was poised to announce more. By January 2, the Bush transition had named a designee for every Cabinet position. This was only a week later than the date by which Clinton had announced a full Cabinet in the previous presidential transition. Bush had announced all of his Cabinet picks over a three-week period, compared to the eight to ten weeks over which these had been rolled out during the previous four presidential transitions.

On December 18, incoming First Lady Laura Bush met with Clinton's wife Hillary in the White House for tea and a tour of the residence.

On December 19, Bush met in the White House with Clinton. That same day, Bush also met at Number One Observatory Circle with Gore, who was not just his defeated opponent, but was also the outgoing vice president.

Bush pledged that he would establish an "office of faith-based action" in his administration to search for ways that religious groups would be able to give such services as drug treatment and welfare-to-work programs that had been traditionally provided by the federal government. On December 20, Bush held a meeting in Austin, Texas with roughly 20 religious leaders from around the country, to discuss his plan for "faith-based" solutions to social issues. A third of the religious leaders were black. The number of black religious leaders included in this meeting was viewed to be part of an effort for Bush to reach out to black people, after the Bush–Cheney ticket was reported to have received the lowest share of the black vote by a Republican ticket since the share president Ronald Reagan and his vice president George H. W. Bush (Bush's father) had received when they won reelection in 1984.

The progress Bush made by Christmas lagged behind the progress that the previous, Clinton, transition had made by that point. However, Clinton did not experience the delay in starting his transition that Bush had faced. The pace that Bush's transition had been able to proceed at after its delayed start earned praise from political experts such as Fred Greenstein. Bush felt so comfortable with the progress made by his transition effort, that he took a several-day "non-working" Christmas vacation, traveling both to his Texas ranch and to Florida. At the same time, many others in the transition effort took a break, causing the effort to decrease from the pace it had been accelerating at up to that point following Bush becoming president-elect.

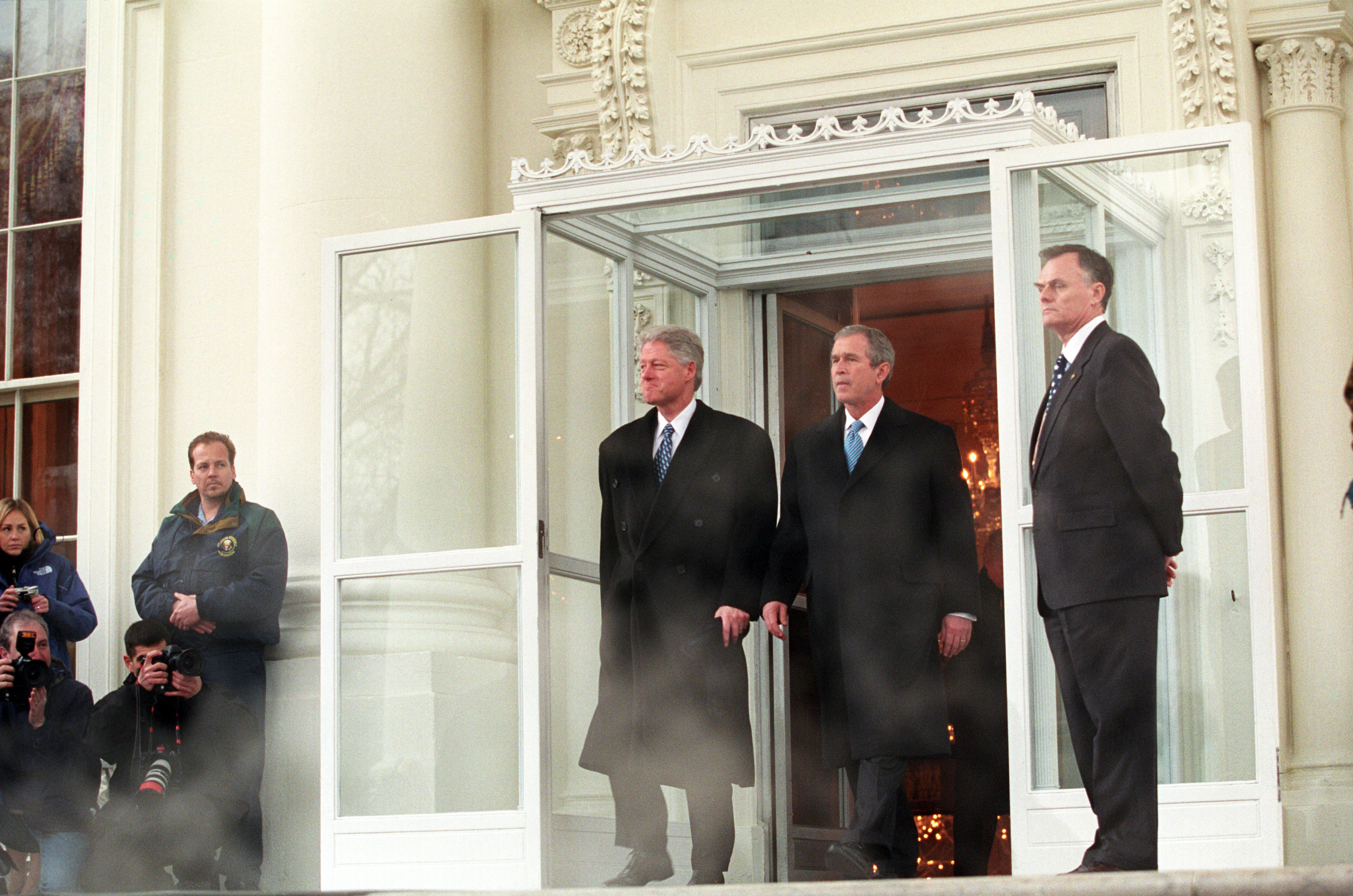
President Clinton and President–elect Bush depart the White House for the inaugural ceremony at the United States Capitol on January 20, 2001.

The transition experienced some controversy when Bush's selection for Secretary of Labor, Linda Chavez, withdrew her nomination on January 9 after the media reported that she had previously employed an undocumented immigrant.

The transition was also marred by accusations of "damage, theft, vandalism and pranks" by members of the outgoing Clinton administration. Initially, a 2001 audit by the General Accounting Office (GAO) found little truth to the allegations of vandalism and pranks. However, after pressure from Republican congressman Bob Barr, the GAO launched a deeper investigation, producing a 2002 report which estimated that there had been between $13,000 to $14,000 worth of damage. This included graffiti in the men's bathroom at the White House, glue smeared on desk drawers, and missing doorknobs, medallions, and office signs. However, it is noted that similar pranks were reported in prior transitions, including the one from Bush's father to Clinton in 1993. Bush press secretary Ari Fleischer followed up the GAO report with a White House-produced list of alleged vandalism including removal of the 'W' key from keyboards. The Clintons were also accused of keeping for themselves gifts meant for the White House. The Clintons denied these accusations, but agreed to pay more than $85,000 for gifts given to the first family "to eliminate even the slightest question" of impropriety.

== Selection of appointees ==
=== Domestic policy ===
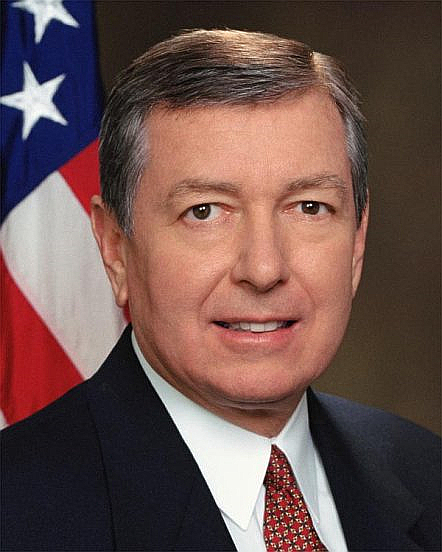
John Ashcroft
Attorney General
(announced December 22, 2000)

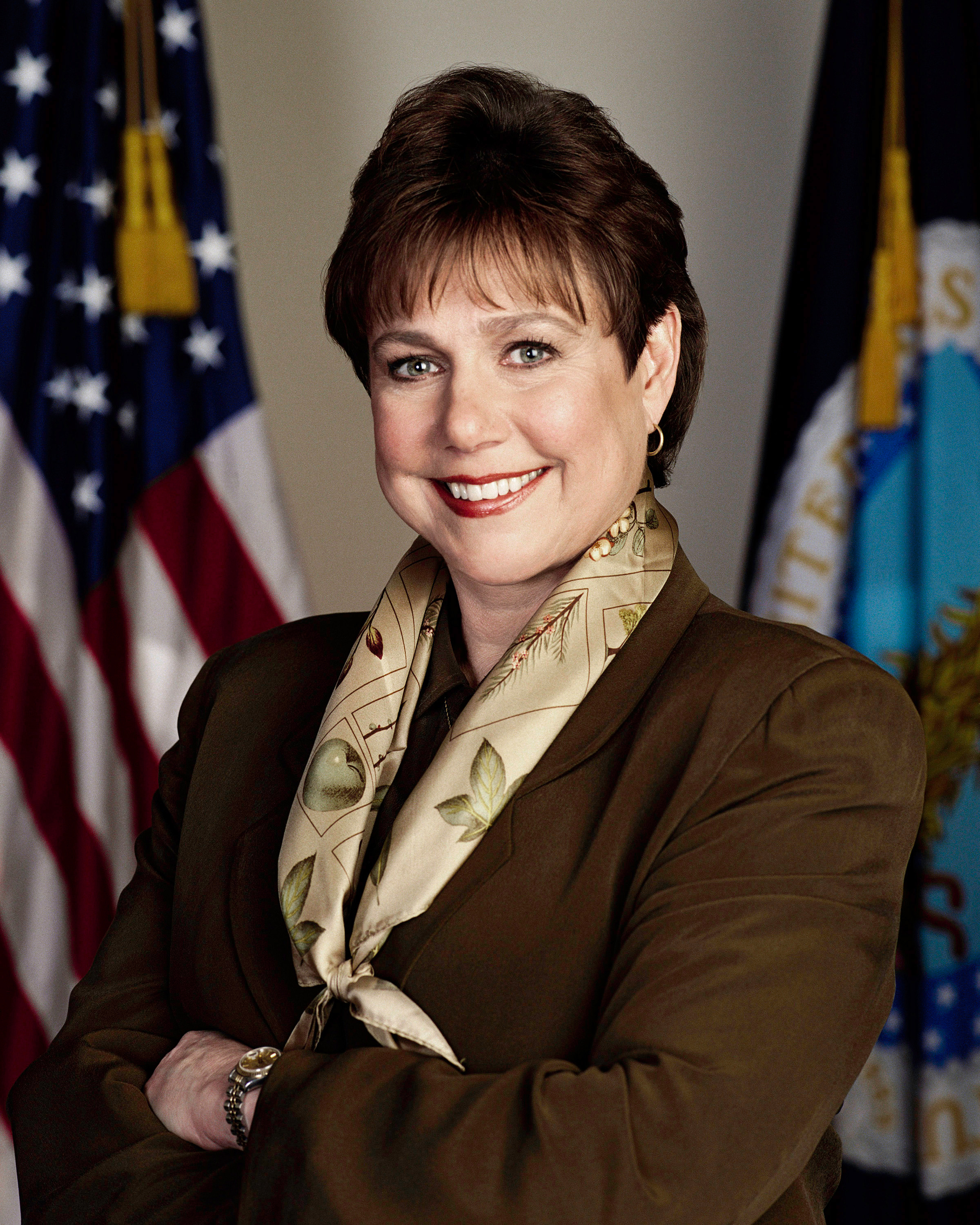
Ann Veneman
Secretary of Agriculture
(announced December 20, 2000)

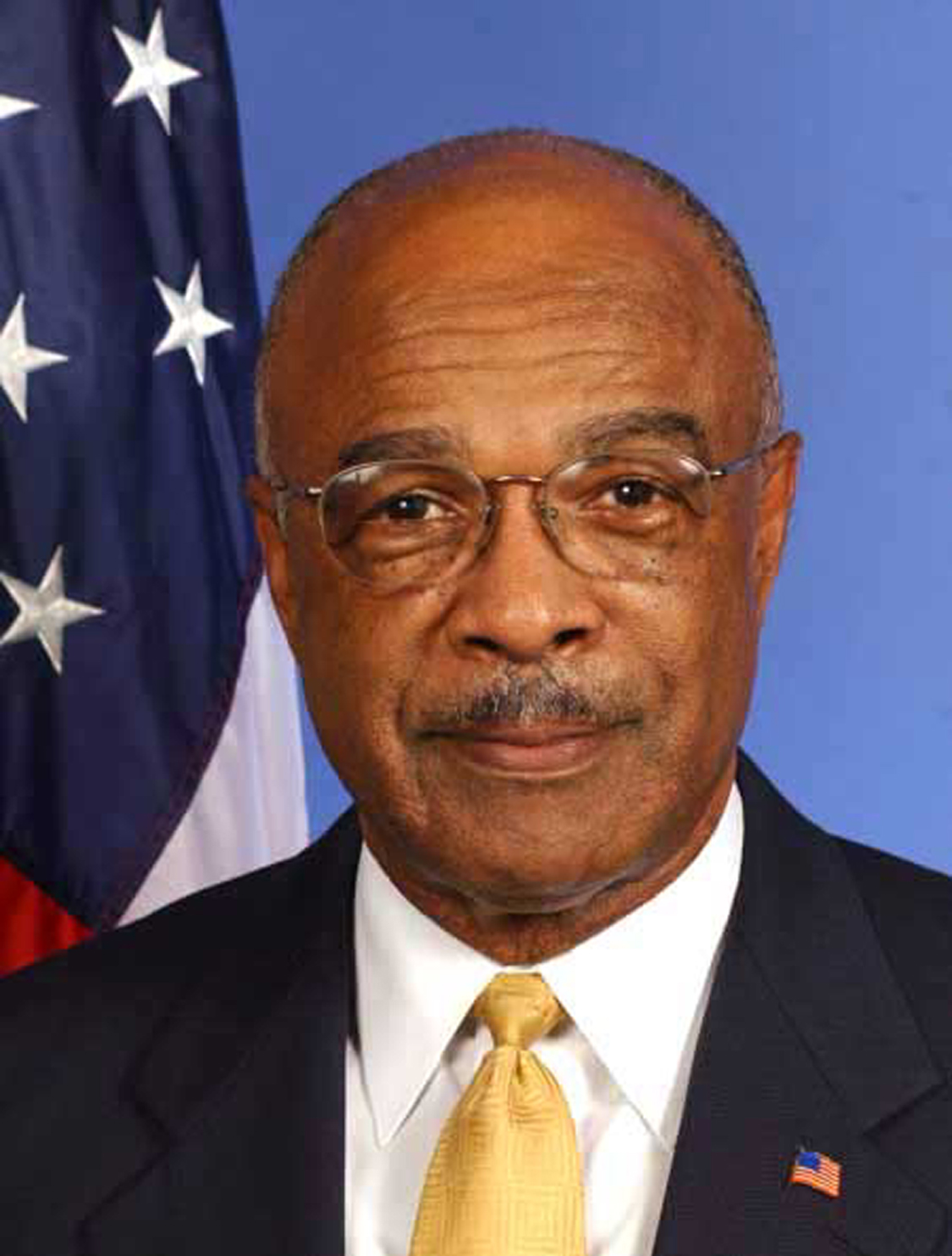
Rod Paige
Secretary of Education
(announced December 29, 2000)

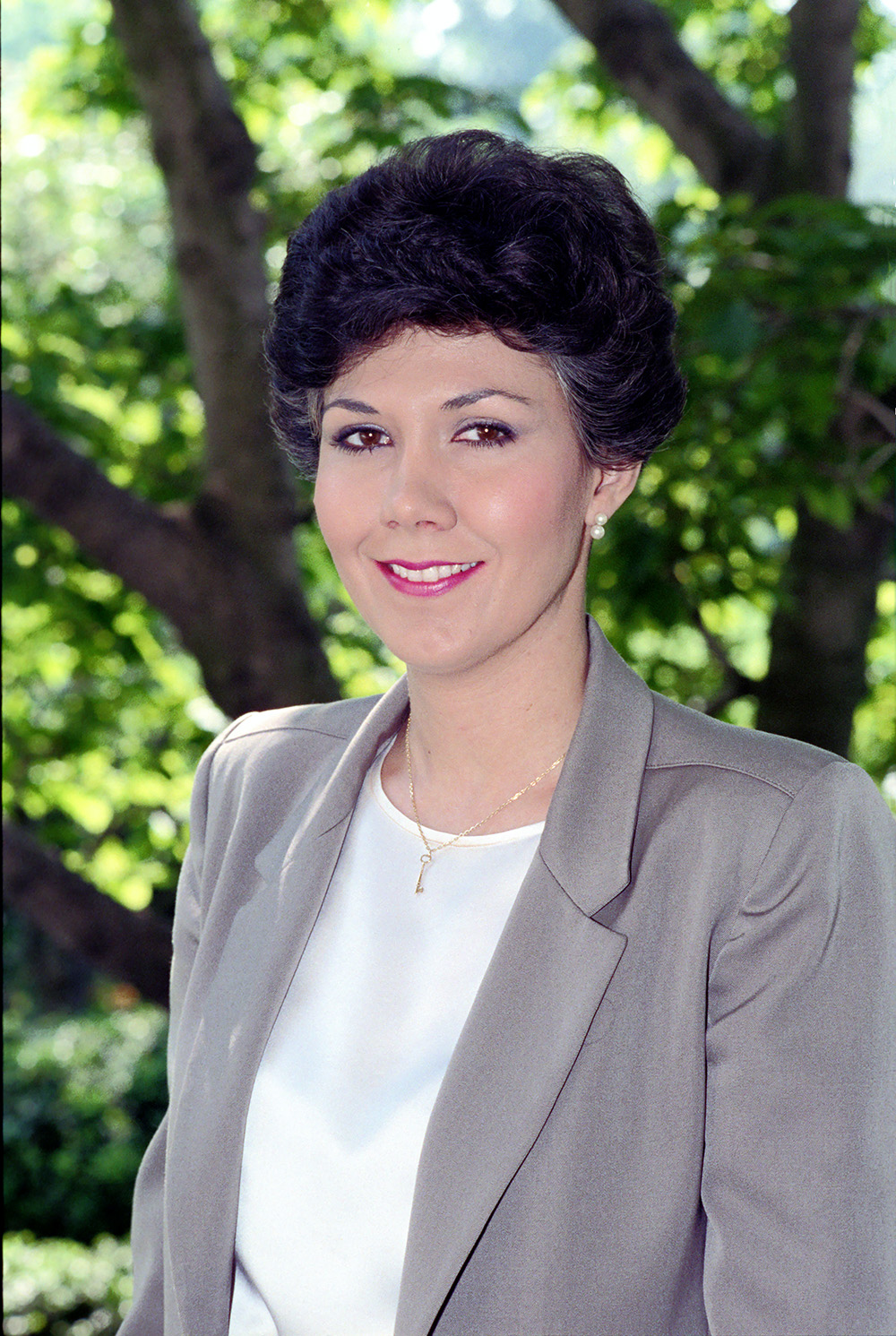
Linda Chavez
Secretary of Labor
(announced January 2, 2001; withdrew January 9, 2001)

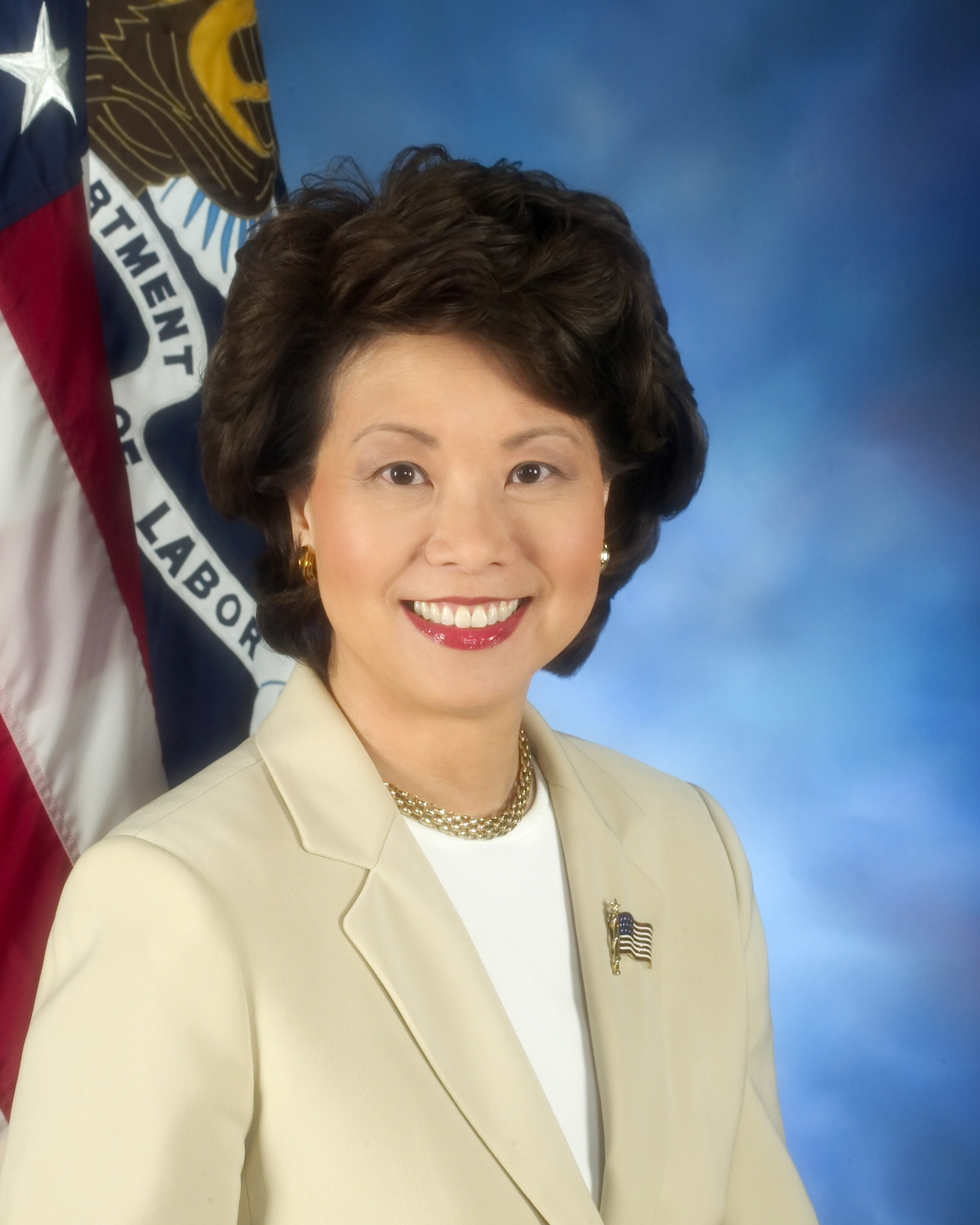
Elaine Chao
Secretary of Labor
(announced January 11, 2001)

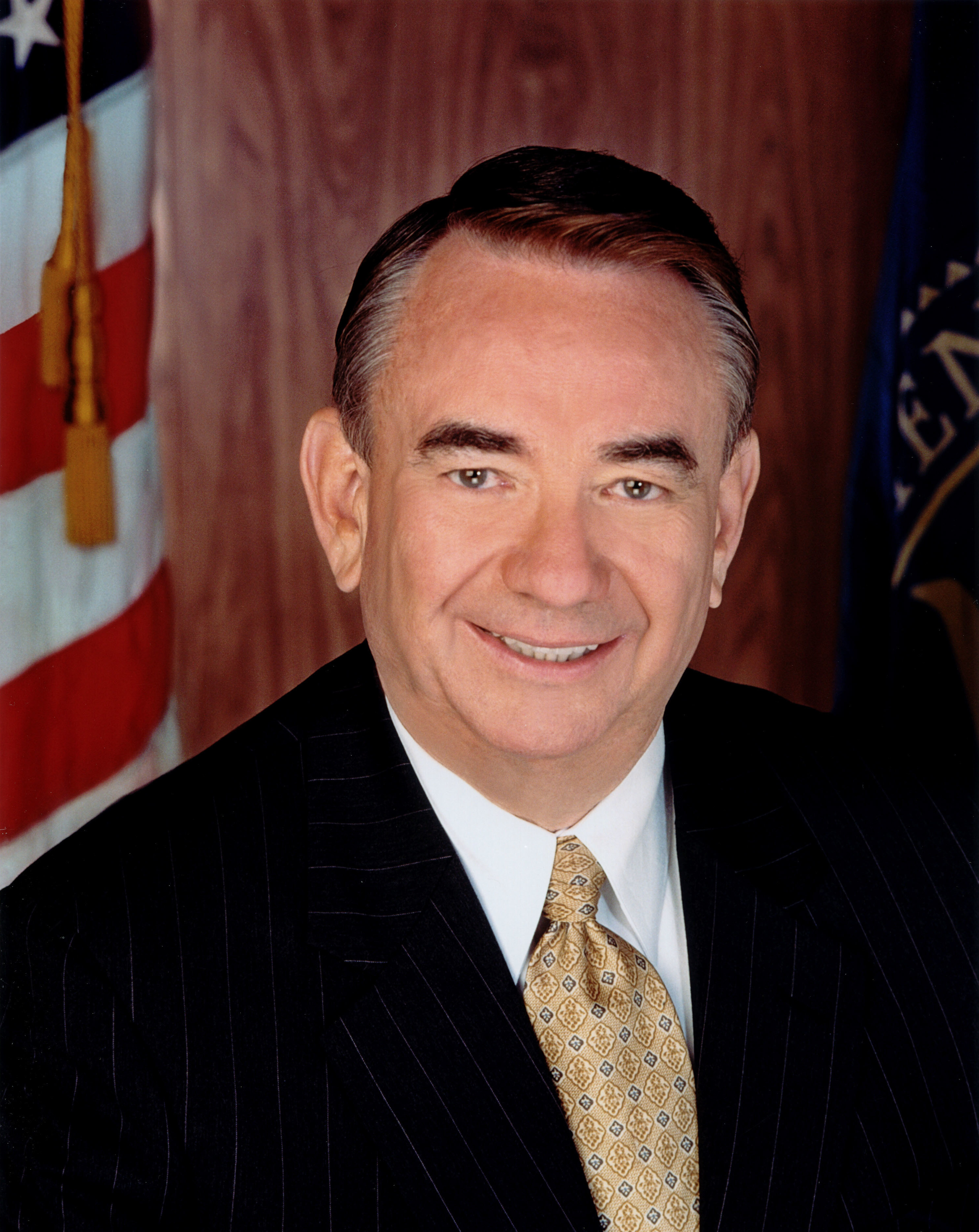
Tommy Thompson
Secretary of Health and Human Services
(announced December 29, 2000)

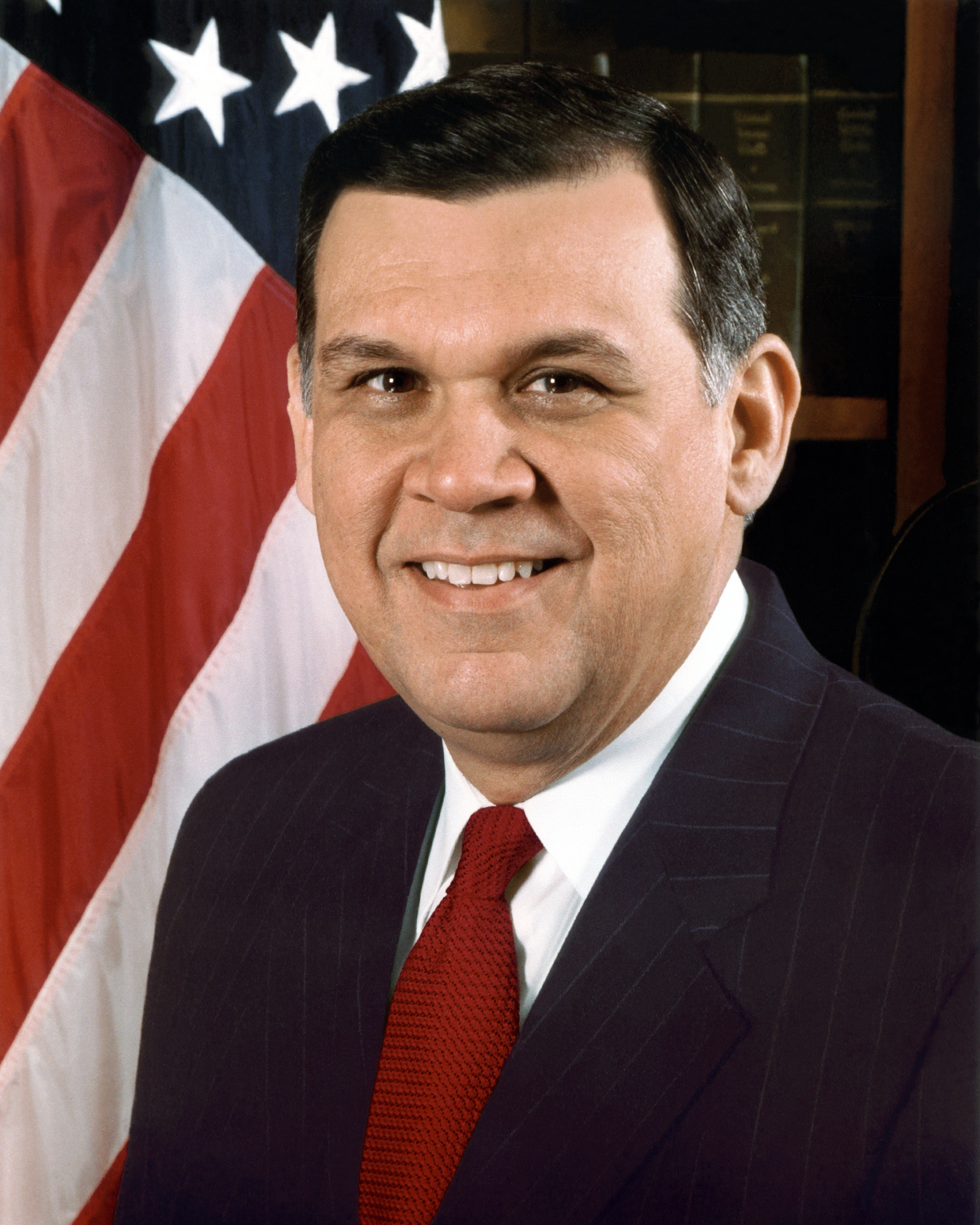
Mel Martinez
Secretary of Housing and Urban Development
(announced December 20, 2000)

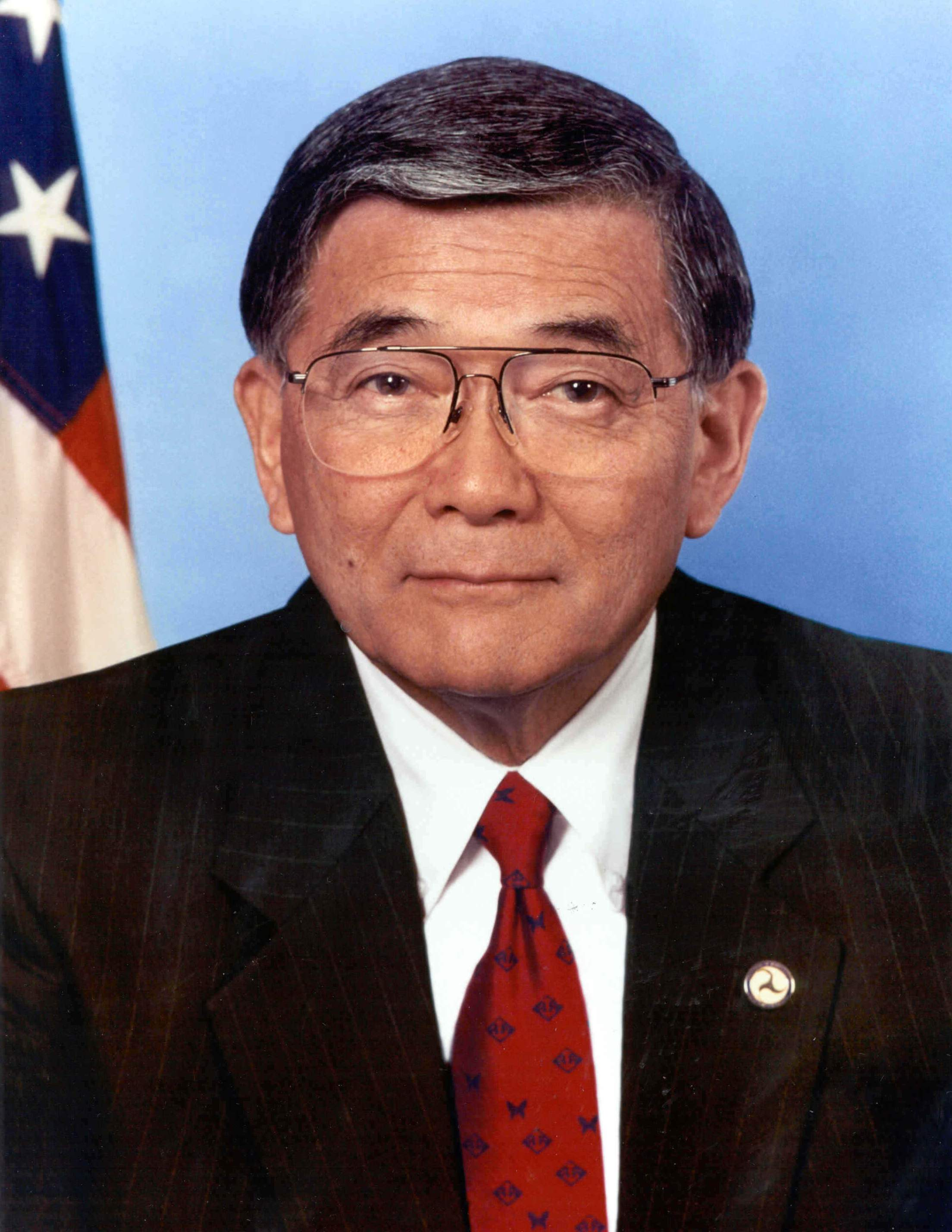
Norman Y. Mineta
Secretary of Transportation
(announced January 2, 2001)

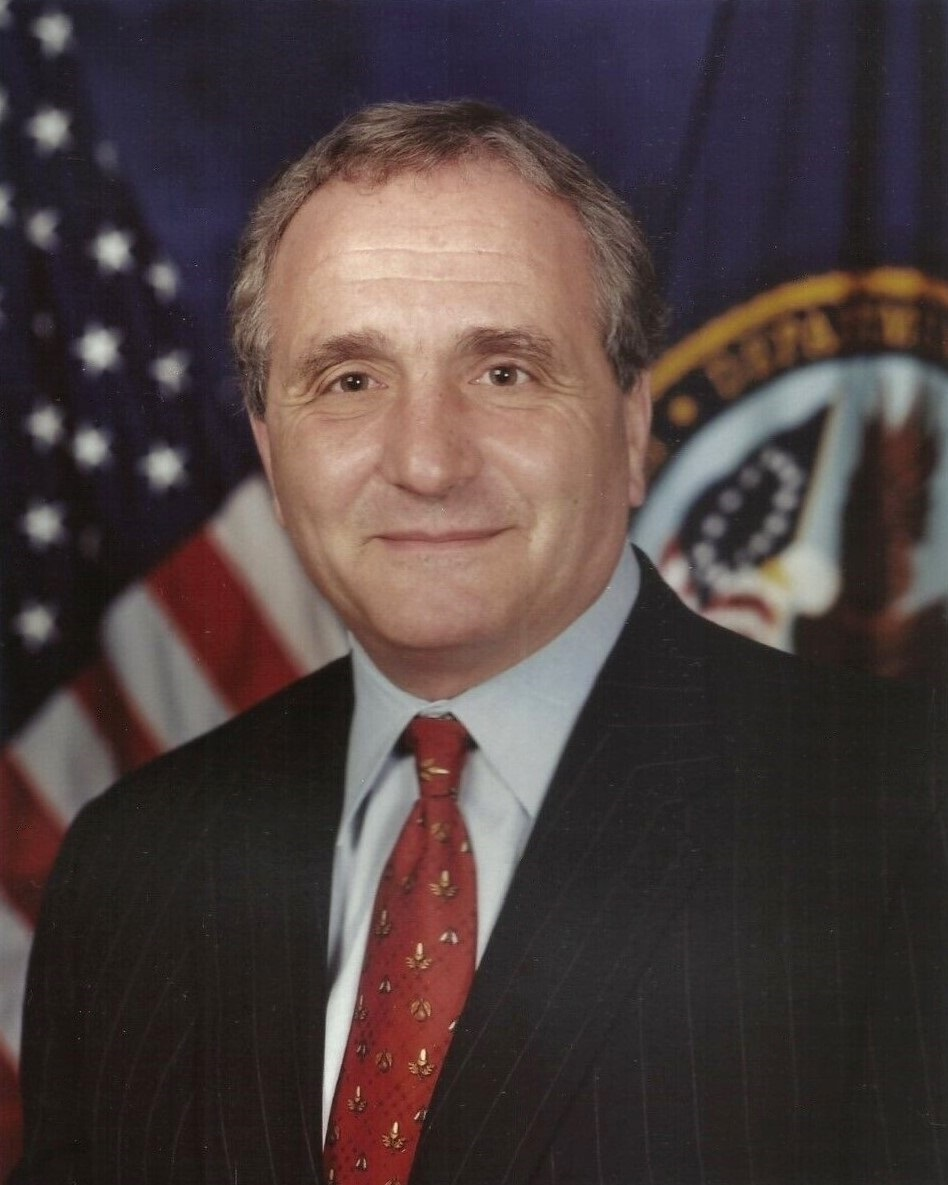
Anthony J. Principi
Secretary of Veterans Affairs
(announced December 29, 2000)

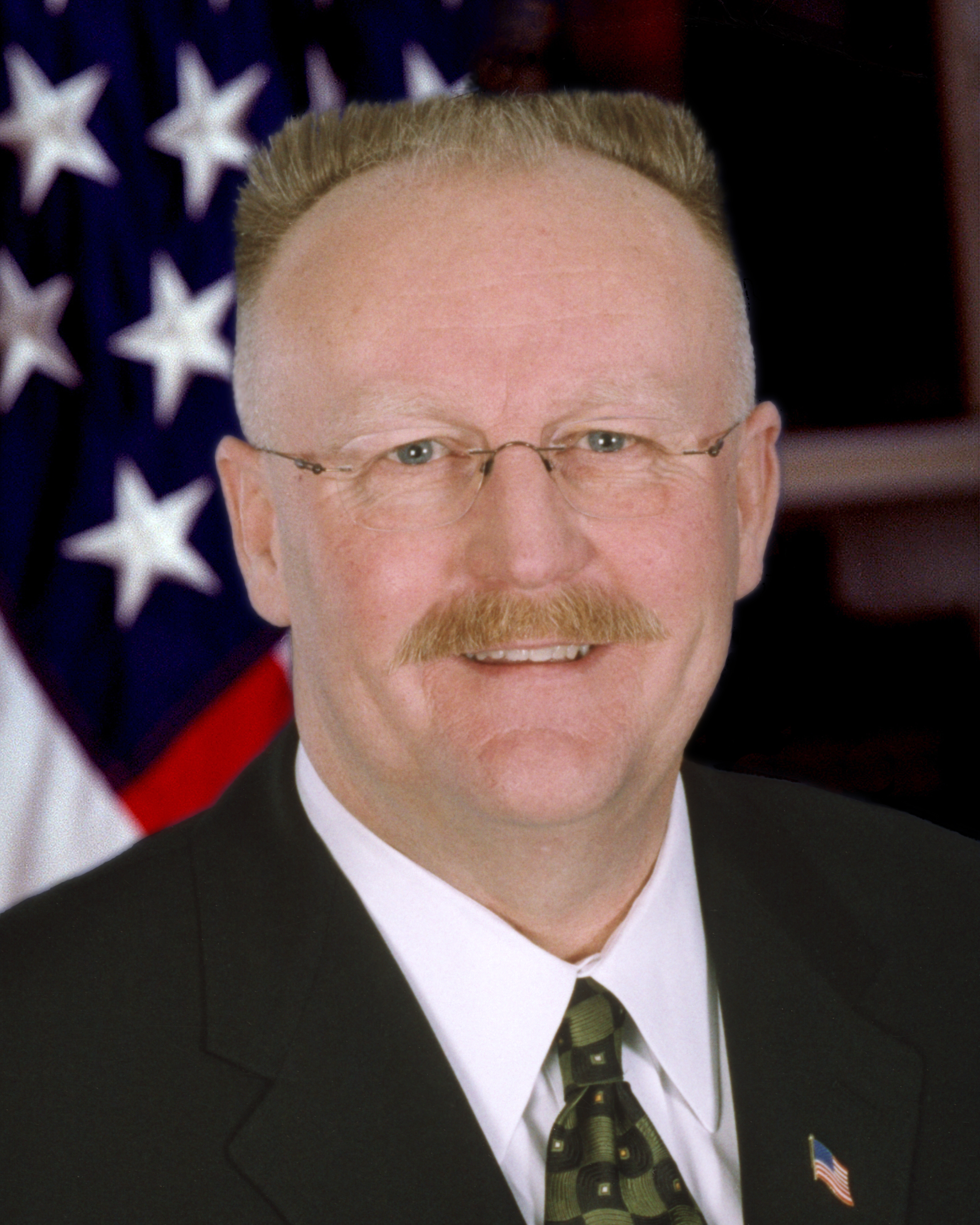
Joe Allbaugh
Director of the Federal Emergency Management Agency
(announced January 4, 2001)

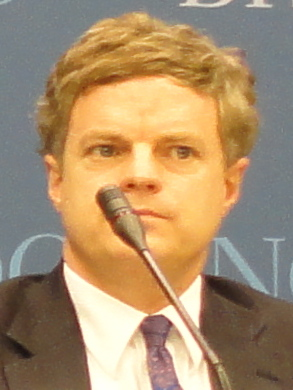
John Bridgeland
Director of the Domestic Policy Council and Deputy Domestic Policy Advisor
(announced January 9, 2001)

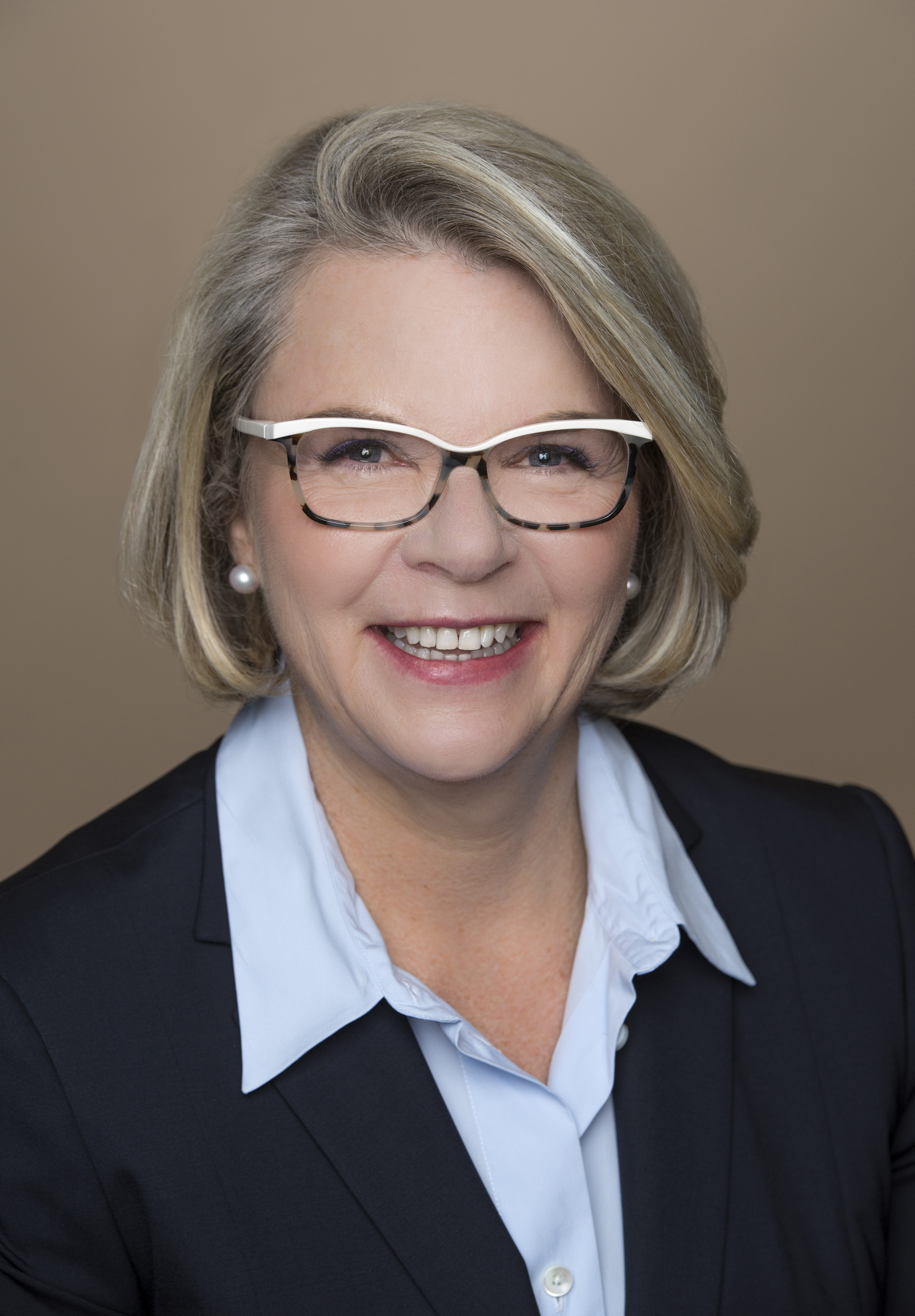
Margaret La Montagne
(now Spellings)
Assistant to the President for Domestic Policy
(announced January 5, 2001)

=== Economic policy ===
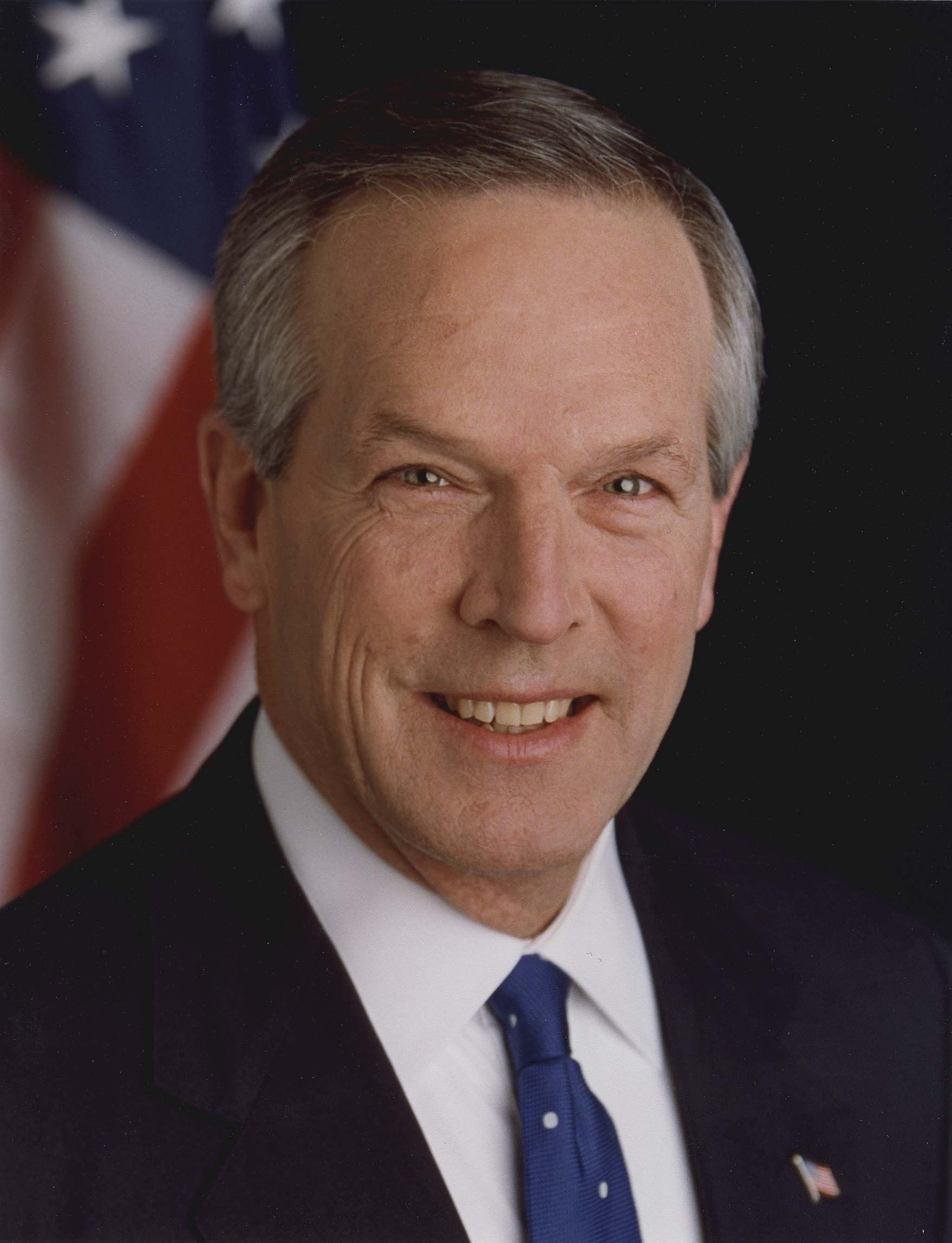
Don Evans
Secretary of Commerce
(announced December 20, 2000)

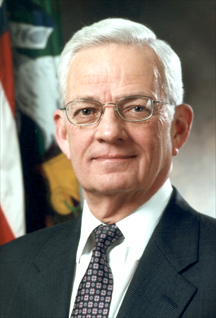
Paul H. O'Neill
Secretary of the Treasury
(announced December 20, 2000)

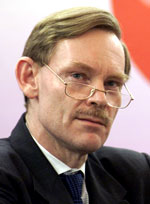
Robert Zoellick
United States Trade Representative
(announced January 11, 2001)

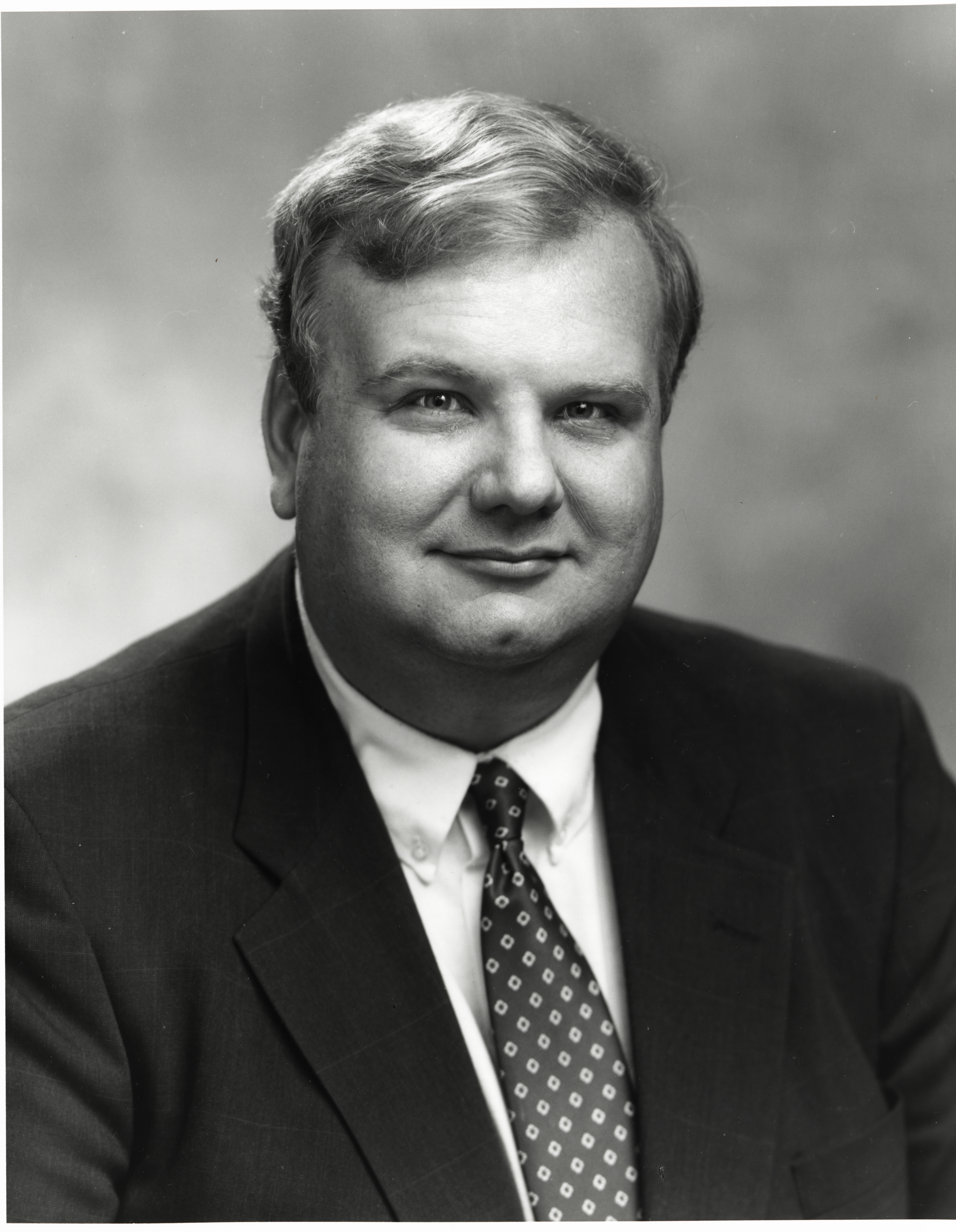
Lawrence Lindsey
Chairman of the National Economic Council
(announced January 3, 2001)

=== Environment and energy ===
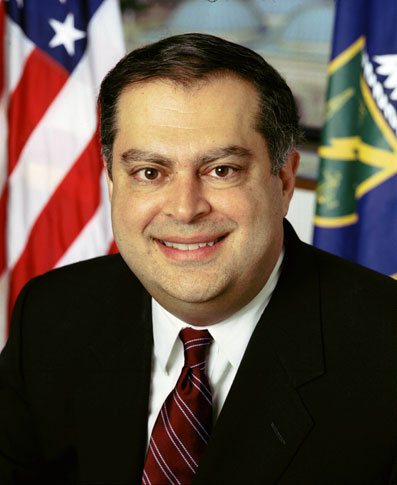
Spencer Abraham
Secretary of Energy
(announced January 2, 2001)

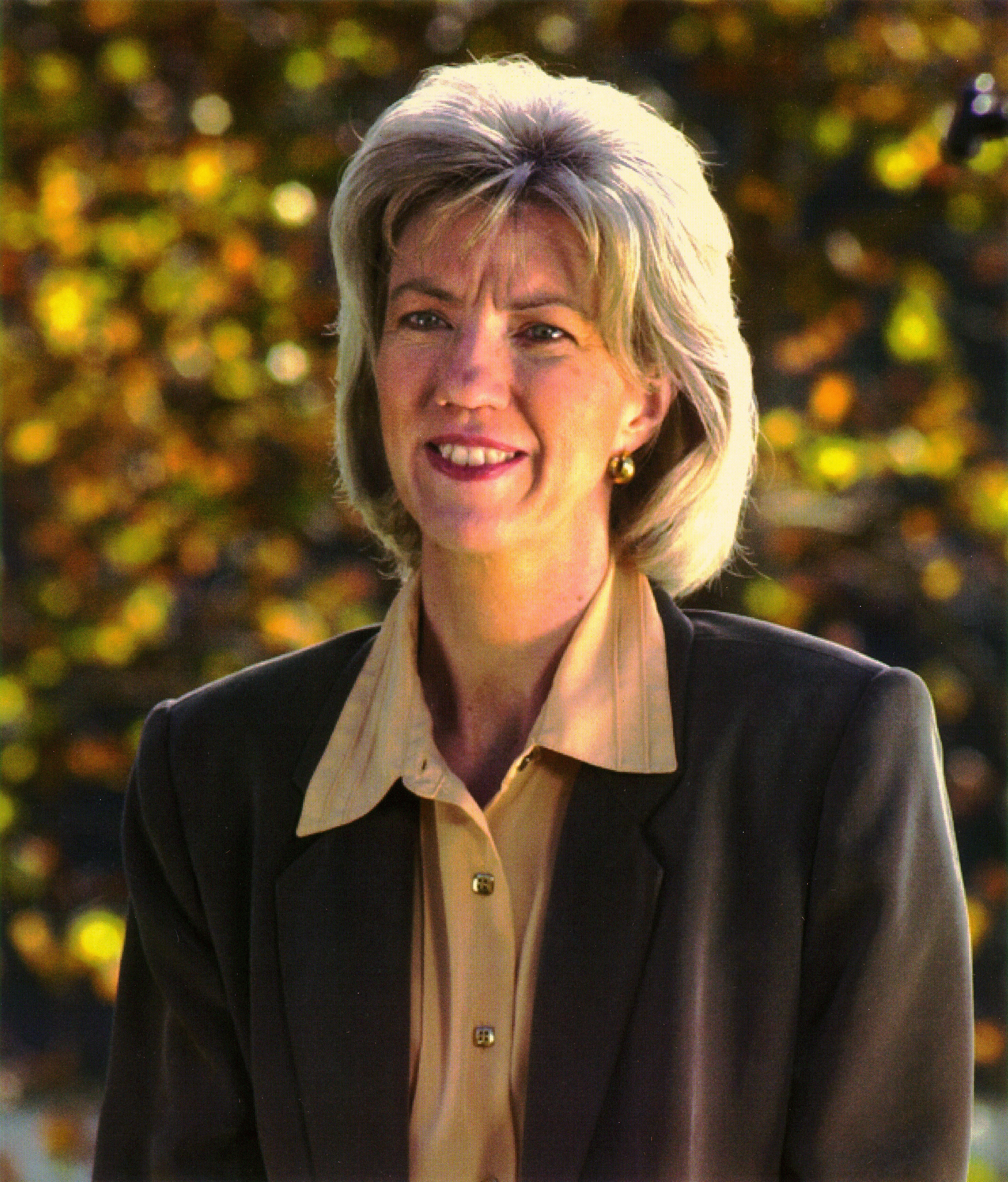
Gale Norton
Secretary of the Interior
(announced December 29, 2000)

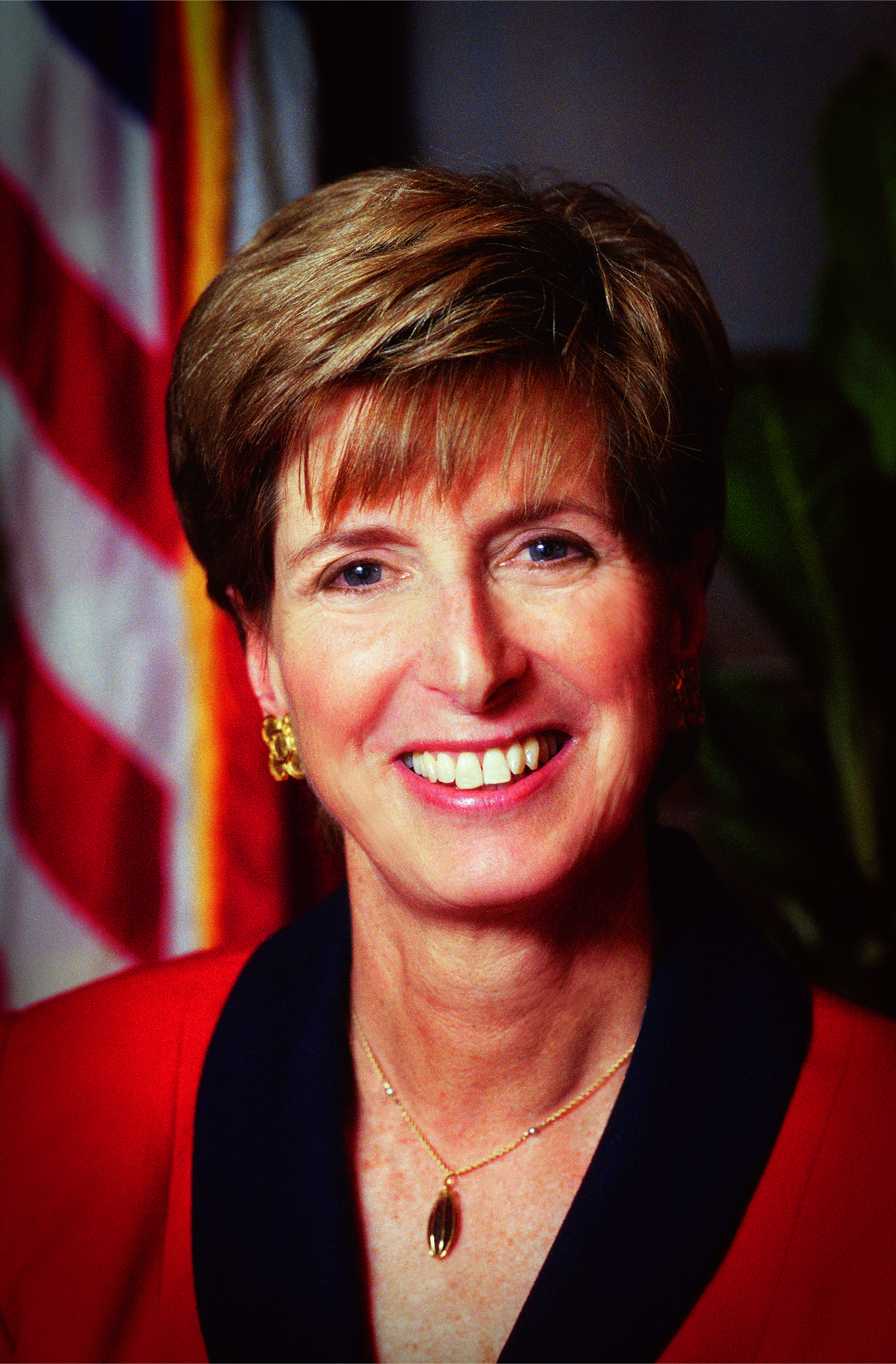
Christine Todd Whitman
Administrator of the Environmental Protection Agency
(announced December 22, 2000)

=== Foreign affairs and national security ===
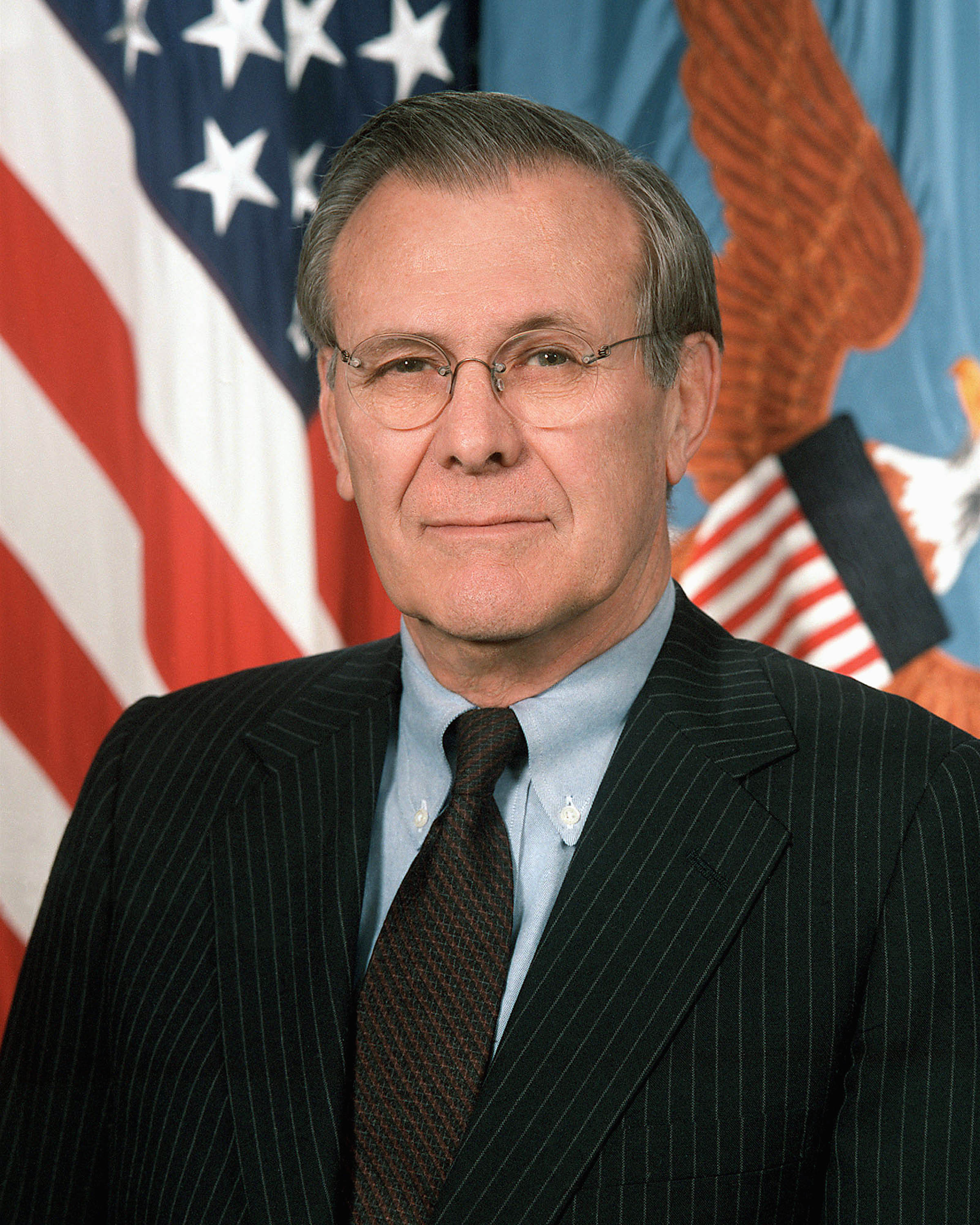
Donald H. Rumsfeld
Secretary of Defense
(announced December 28, 2000)

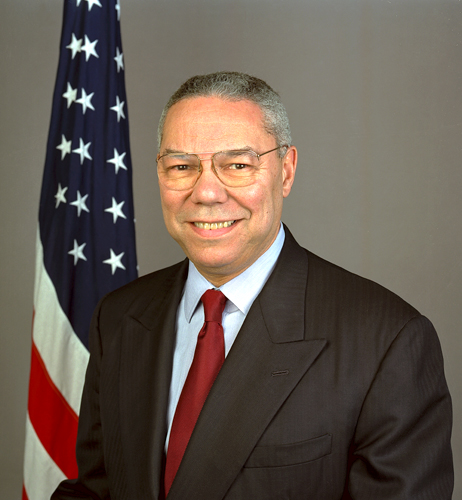
Colin Powell
Secretary of State
(announced in November 2000)

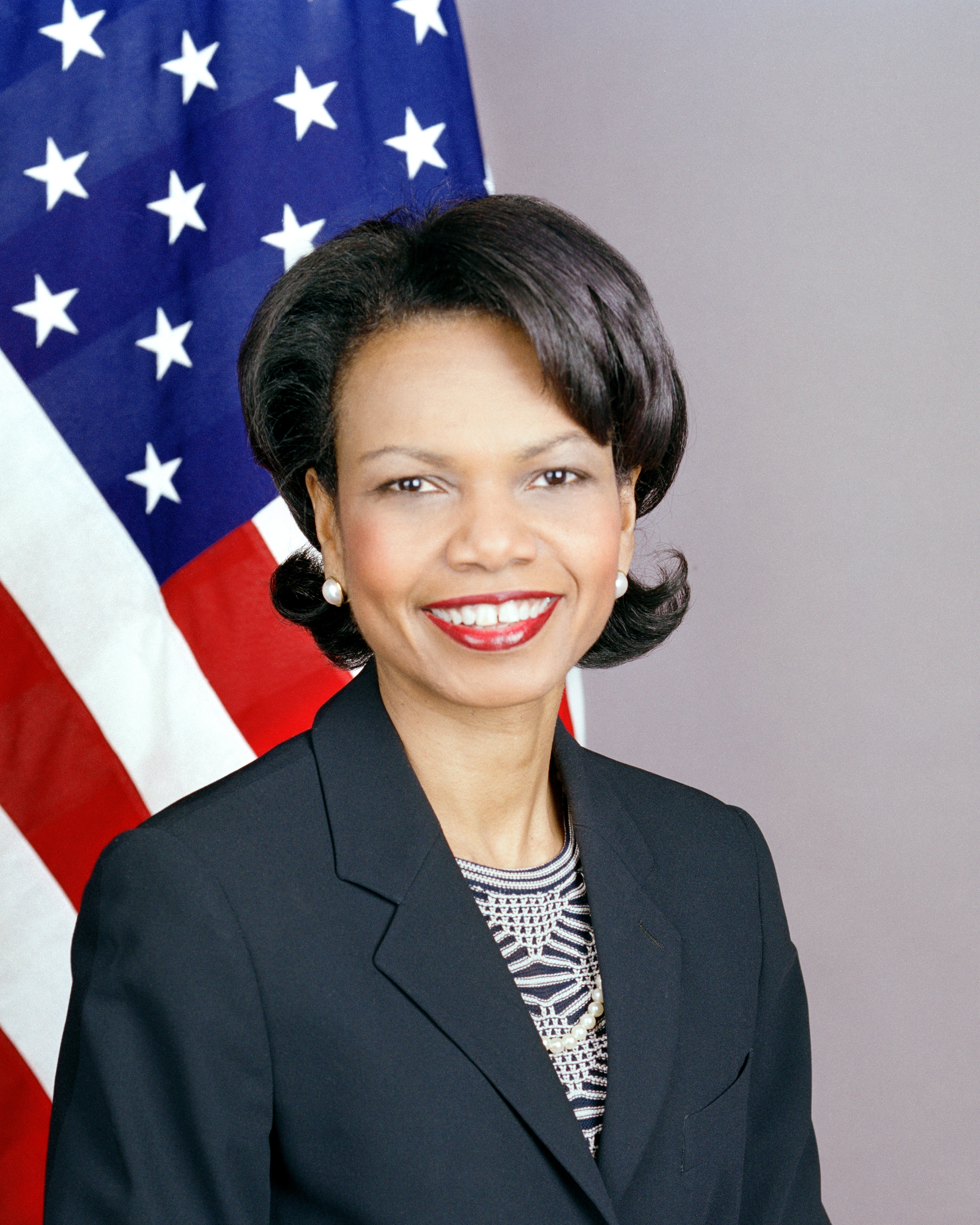
Condoleezza Rice
National Security Advisor
(announced in November 2000)

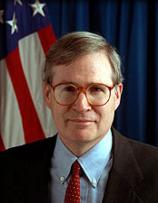
Stephen J. Hadley
Deputy National Security Advisor
(announced December 21, 2000)

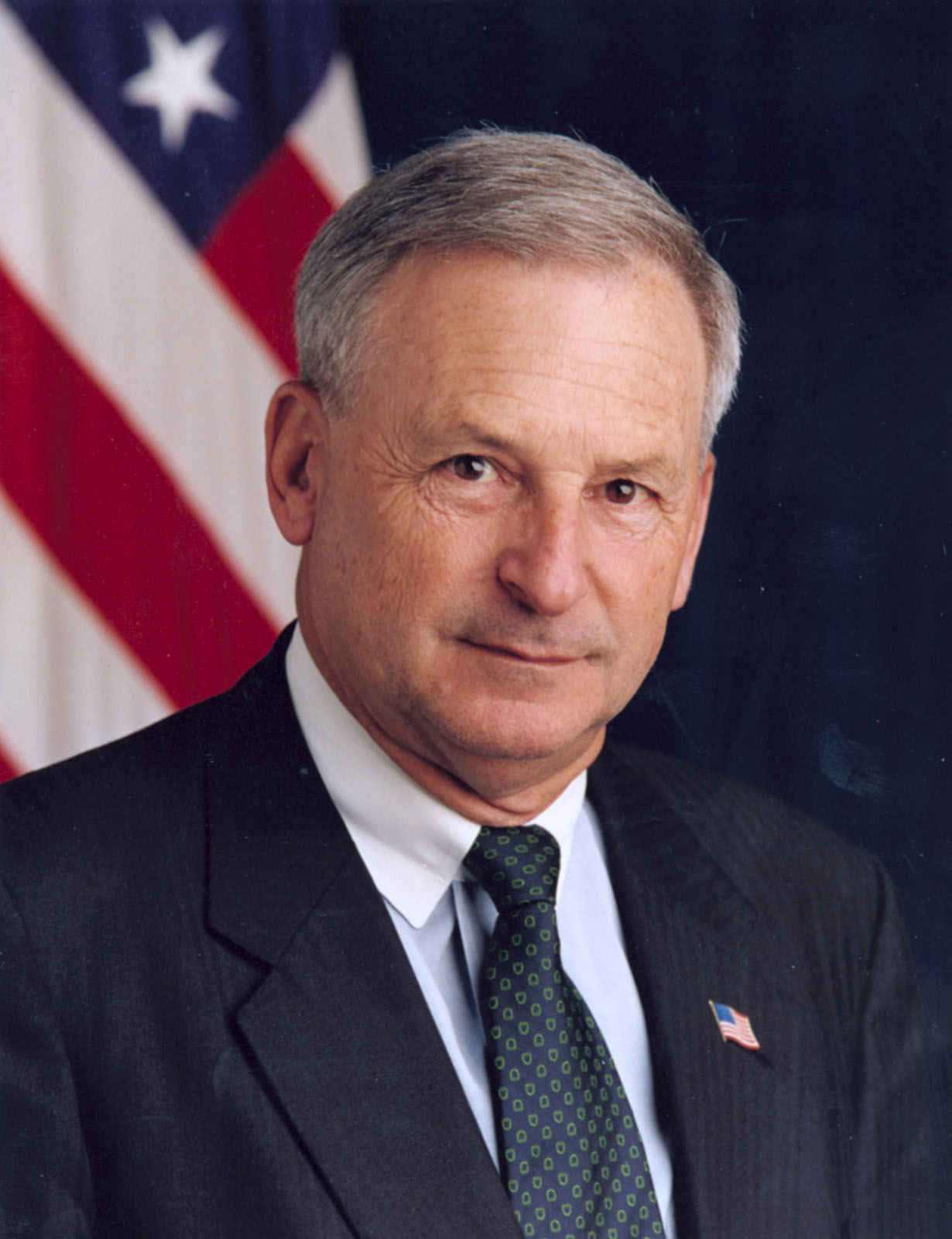
Mark Rosenker
Director of the White House Military Office and Deputy Assistant to the President
(announced January 18, 2001)

=== Other ===
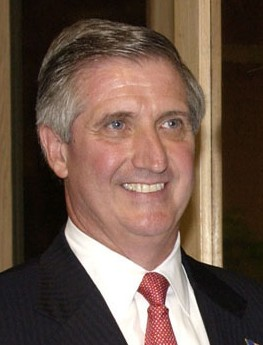
Andrew Card
White House Chief of Staff
(announced November 27, 2000)

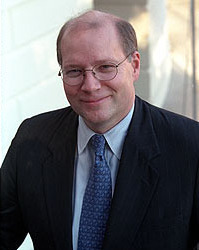
Joe Hagin
White House Deputy Chief of Staff for Operations
(announced December 28, 2000)

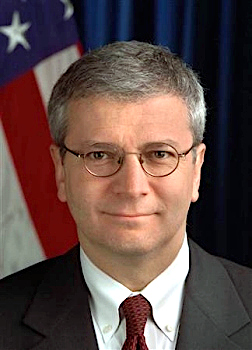
Joshua Bolten
White House Deputy Chief of Staff for Policy
(announced December 28, 2000)

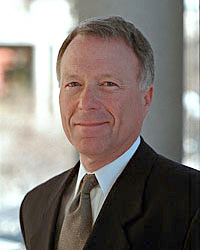
Scooter Libby
Chief of Staff to the Vice President
(announced December 28, 2000)

Dean McGrath
Deputy Chief of Staff to the Vice President
(announced January 5, 2001)

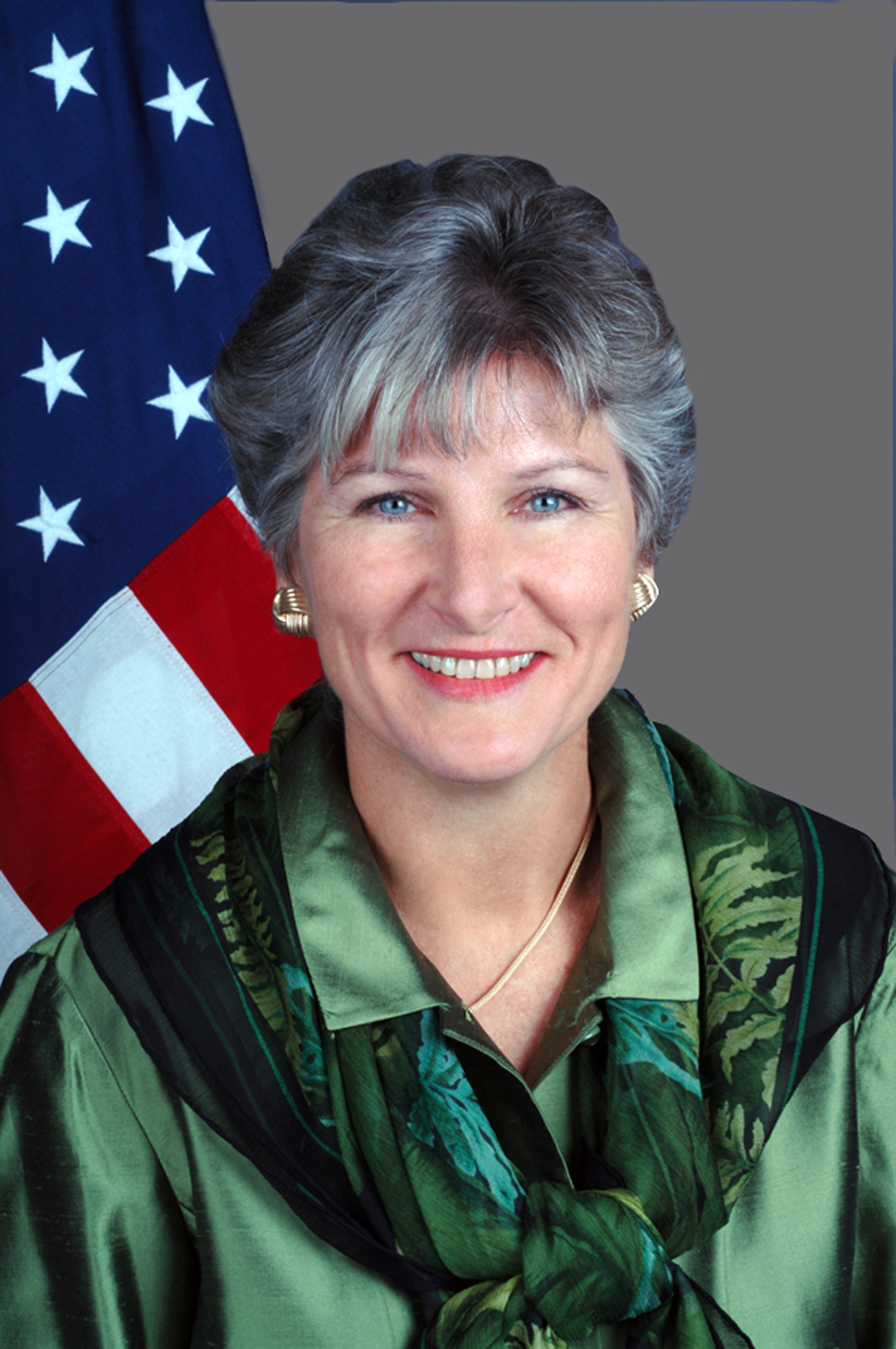
Karen P. Hughes
Counselor to the President
(announced December 17, 2000)

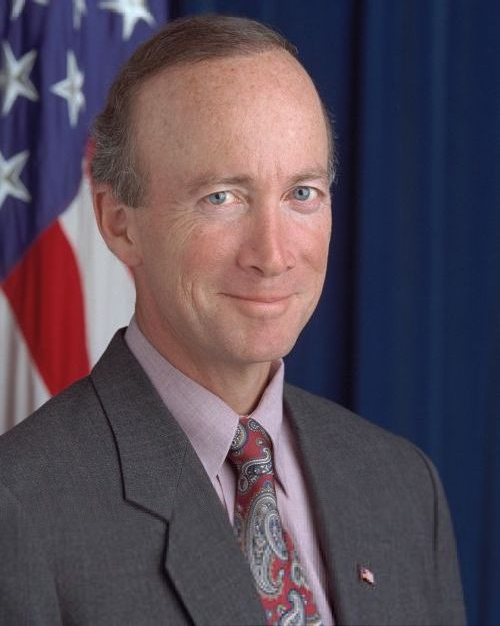
Mitch Daniels
Director of the Office of Management and Budget
(announced December 22, 2000)

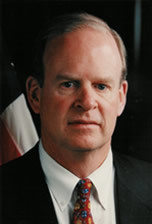
Clay Johnson III
Director of the Office of Presidential Personnel
(announced December 29, 2000)

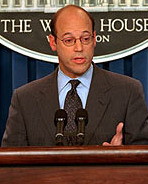
Ari Fleischer
White House Press Secretary
(announced December 28, 2000)

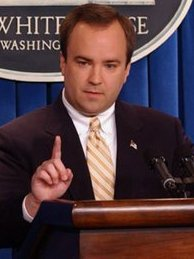
Scott McClellan
White House Deputy Press Secretary
(announced January 8, 2001)

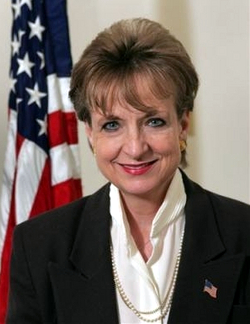
Harriet Miers
White House Staff Secretary
(announced January 5, 2001)

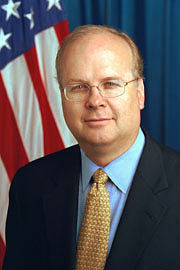
Karl Rove
Senior Advisor to the President
(announced January 4, 2001)

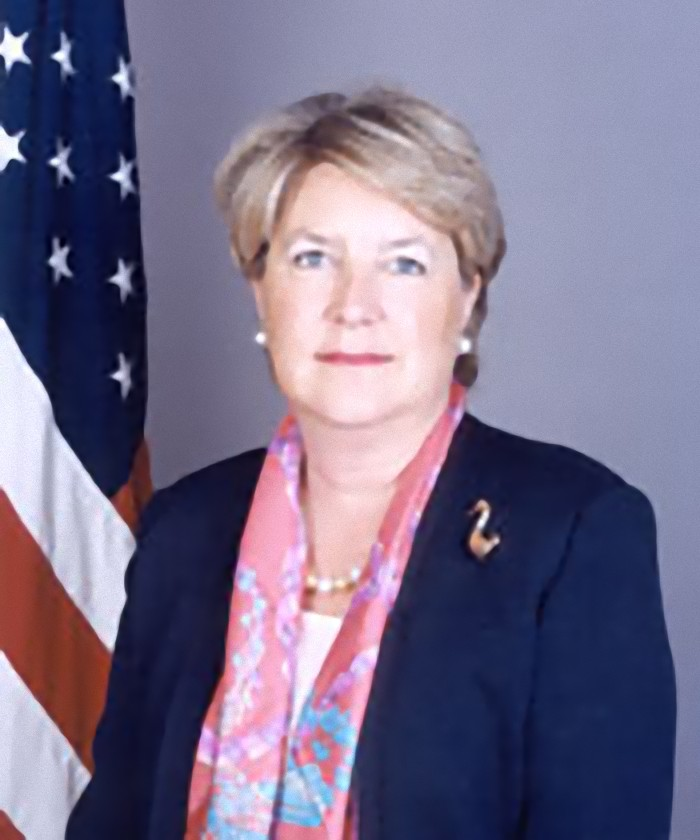
Margaret Tutwiler
Advisor to the President and Special Consultant for Communications
(announced January 10, 2001)

Nicholas Calio
Assistant to the President for Legislative Affairs
(announced January 4, 2001)

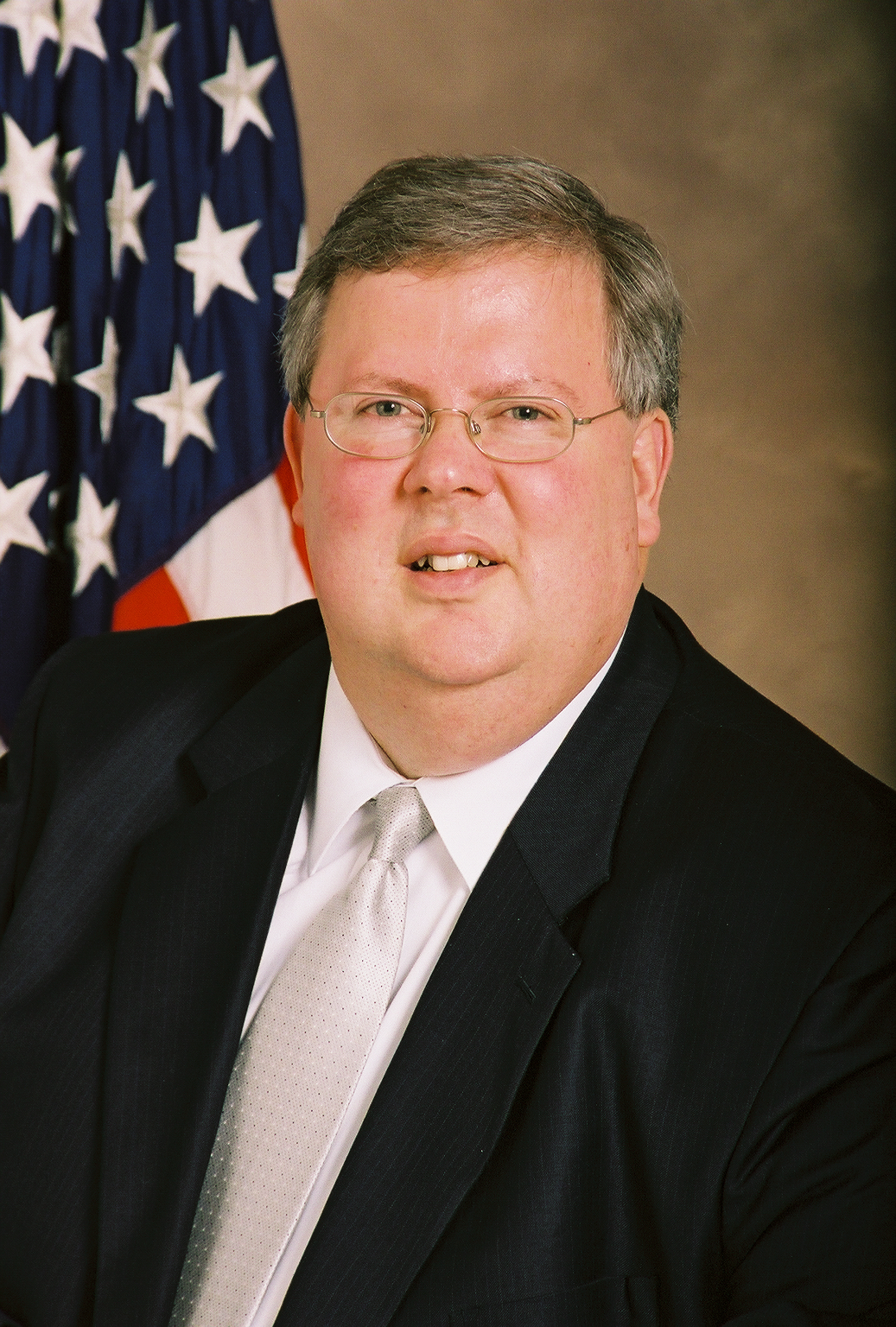
Brian D. Montgomery
Deputy Assistant to the President and Director of Advance
(announced January 8, 2001)

Albert Hawkins
Assistant to the President and Secretary to the Cabinet
(announced January 5, 2001)

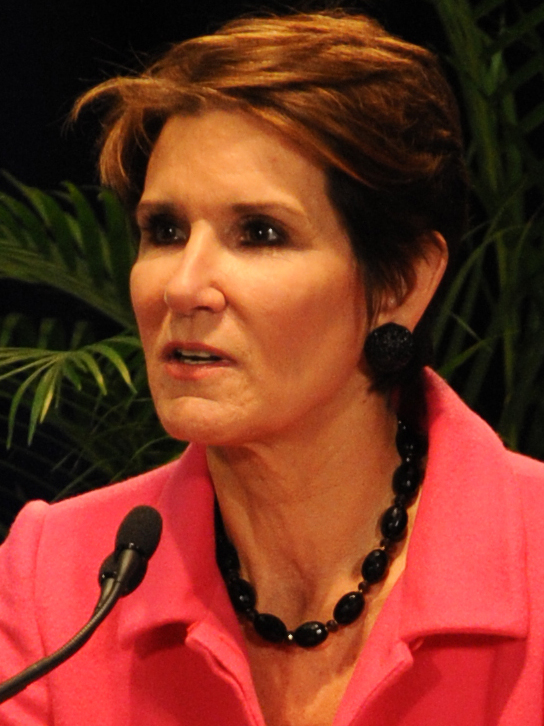
Mary Matalin
Assistant to the President and Counselor to the Vice President
(announced January 5, 2001)

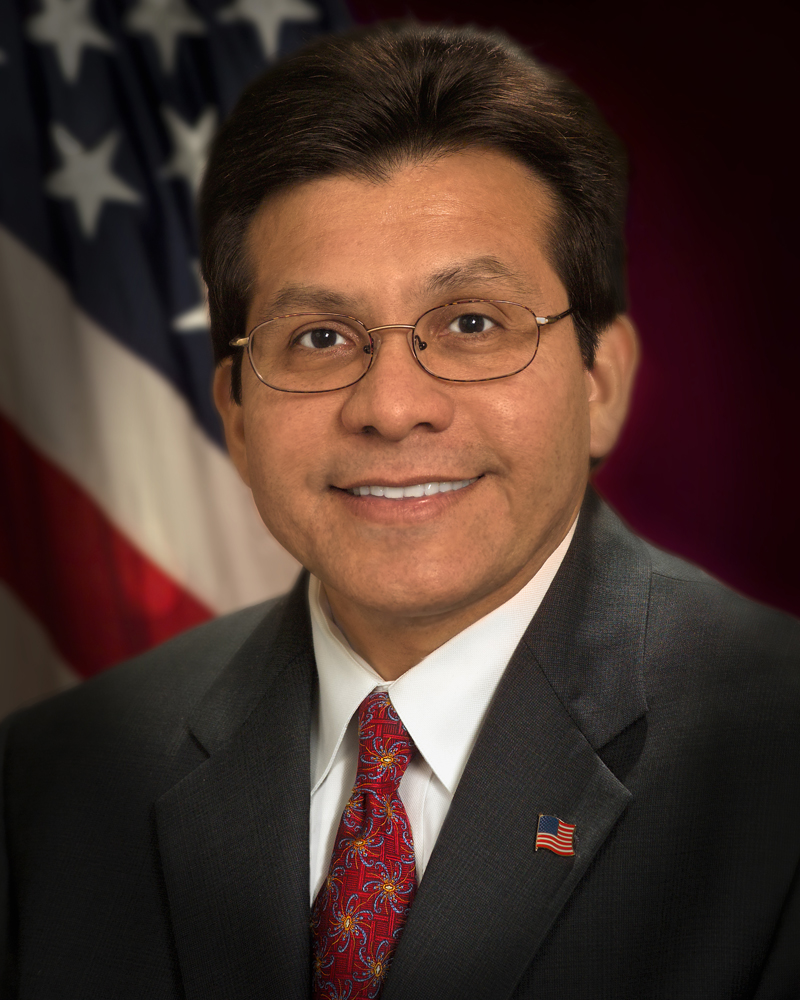
Alberto R. Gonzales
White House Counsel
(announced December 17, 2000)

Timothy Flanigan
Deputy White House Counsel
(announced January 18, 2001)

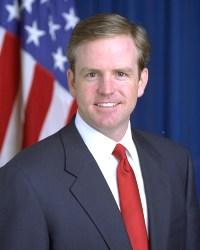
Dan Bartlett
Deputy to the Counselor and Deputy Assistant to the President
(announced January 9, 2001)

Brad Blakeman
Deputy Assistant to the President for Appointments and Scheduling
(announced January 8, 2001)

Hector F. Irastorza, Jr.
Deputy Assistant to the President for Management and Administration
(announced January 8, 2001)

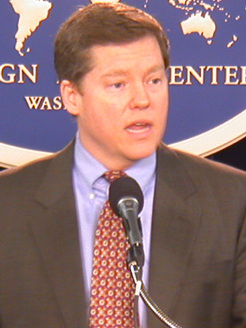
Tucker Eskew
Deputy Assistant to the President for Media Affairs
(announced January 9, 2001)

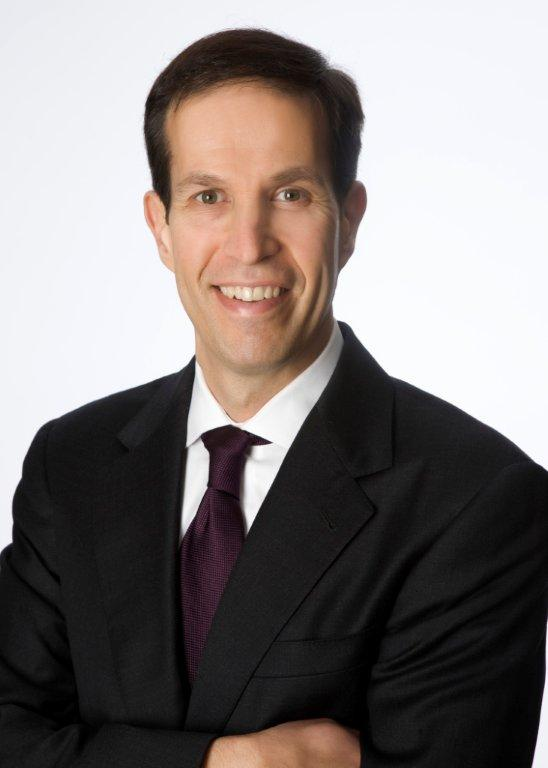
Ken Mehlman
Deputy Assistant to the President for Political Affairs and White House Political Director
(announced January 9, 2001)

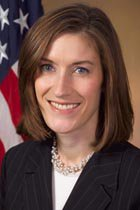
Rachel Brand
Assistant Counsel
(announced January 18, 2001)

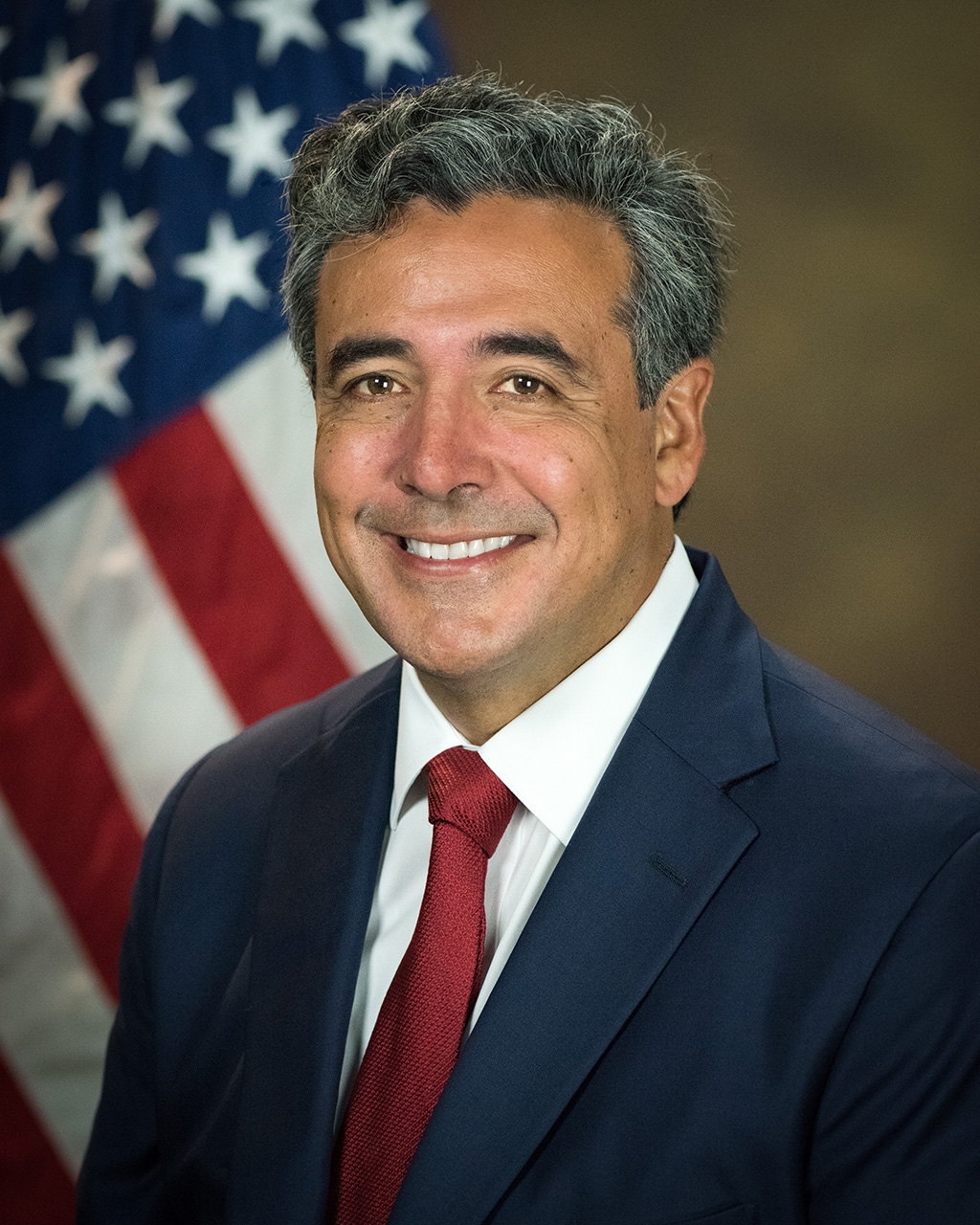
Noel Francisco
Assistant Counsel
(announced January 18, 2001)

Scott Sforza
Special Assistant to the President and deputy director of Communications for Production
(announced January 18, 2001)

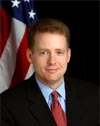
Jim Wilkinson
Special Assistant to the President and deputy director of Communications for Planning
(announced January 18, 2001)

H. Christopher Bartolomucci
Special Assistant to the President and Associate Counsel
(announced January 18, 2001)

Bradford A. Berenson
Special Assistant to the President and Associate Counsel
(announced January 18, 2001)

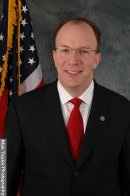
Stuart Bowen
Special Assistant to the President and Associate Counsel
(announced January 18, 2001)

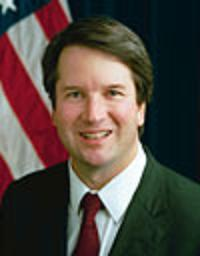
Brett Kavanaugh
Special Assistant to the President and Associate Counsel
(announced January 18, 2001)

Helgi C. Walker
Special Assistant to the President and Associate Counsel
(announced January 18, 2001)

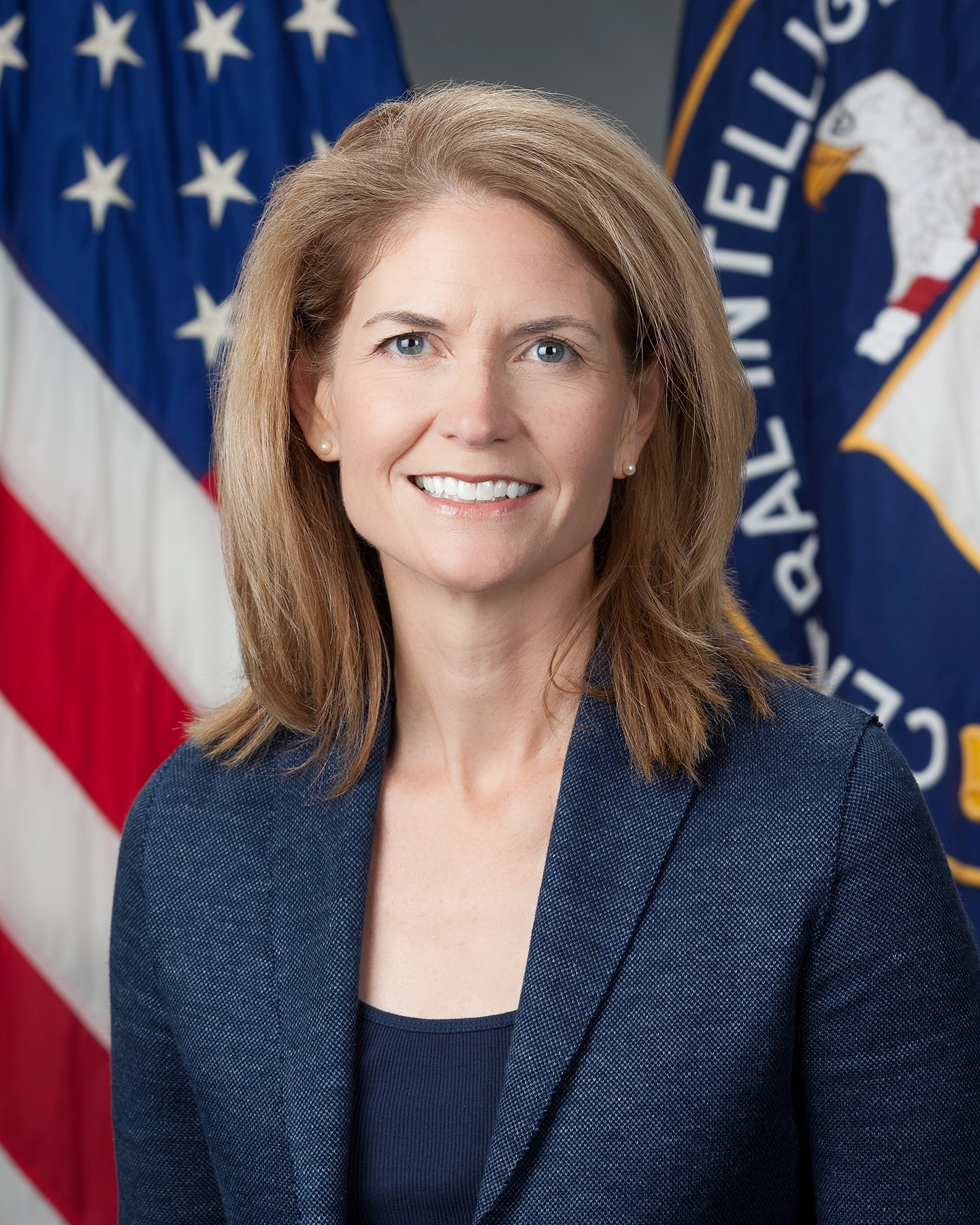
Courtney Simmons Elwood
Special Assistant to the President and Associate Counsel
(announced January 18, 2001)

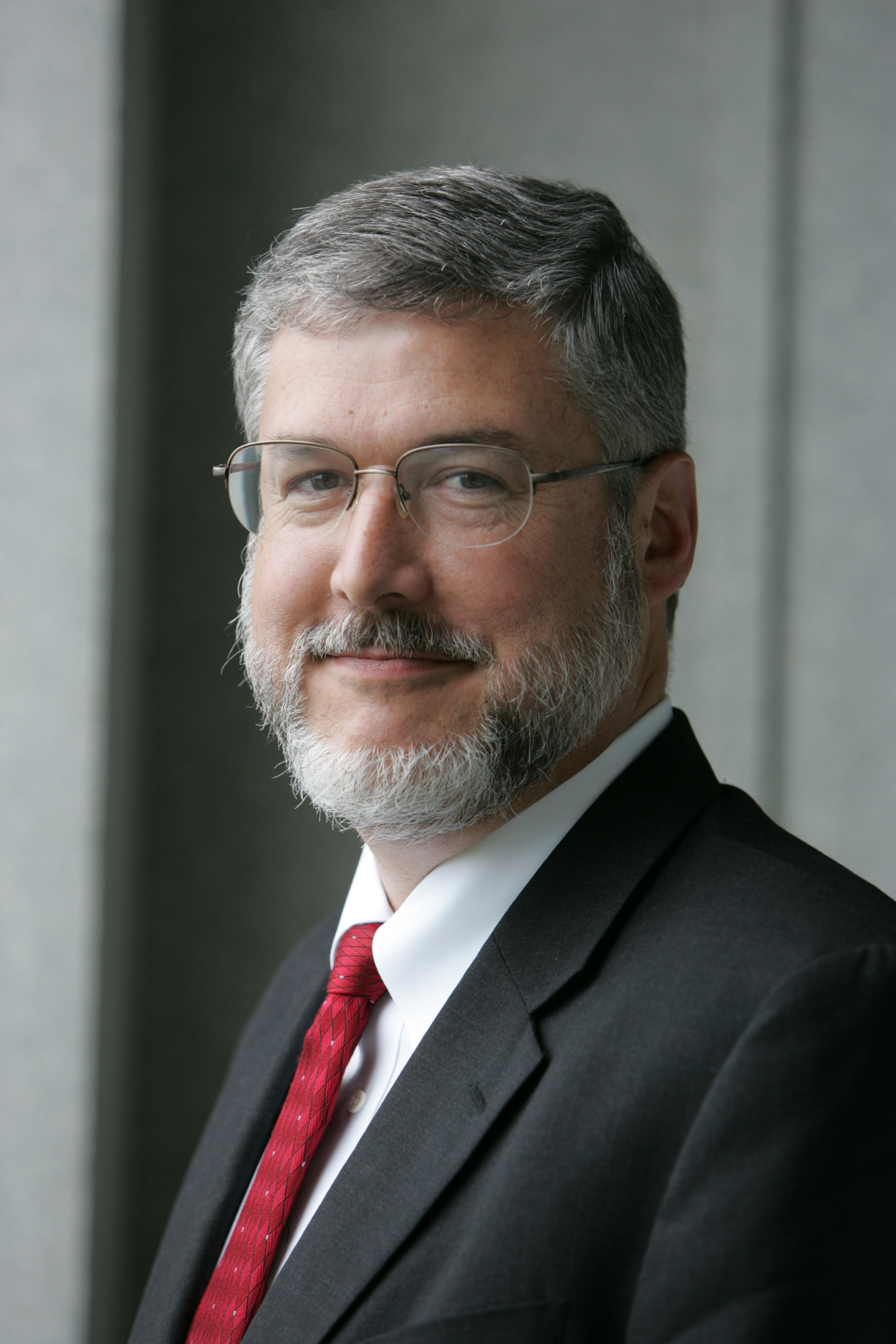
David Addington
Counsel to the Vice President
(announced December 28, 2000)

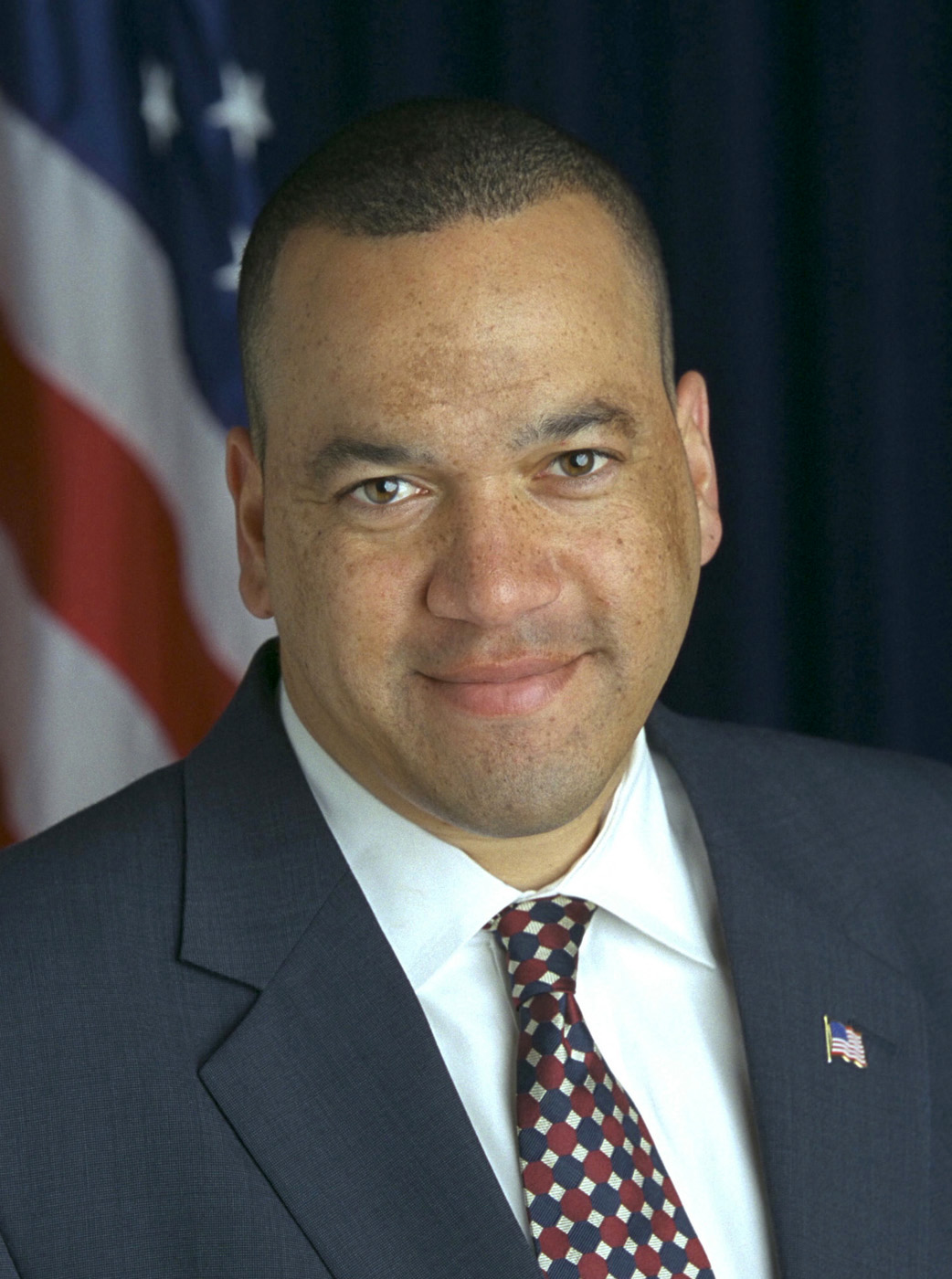
Eric Draper
Chief Official White House Photographer
(announced January 17, 2000)

==== First Lady's staff ====
Andrea Ball
Chief of Staff to the First Lady/Deputy Assistant to the President
(announced January 8, 2001)

Catherine S. Fenton
White House Social Secretary/Special Assistant to the President
(announced January 8, 2001)

Noelia Rodriquez
Press Secretary to the First Lady
(announced January 8, 2001)

Anne Heiligenstein
Director of Projects to the First Lady
(announced January 8, 2001)

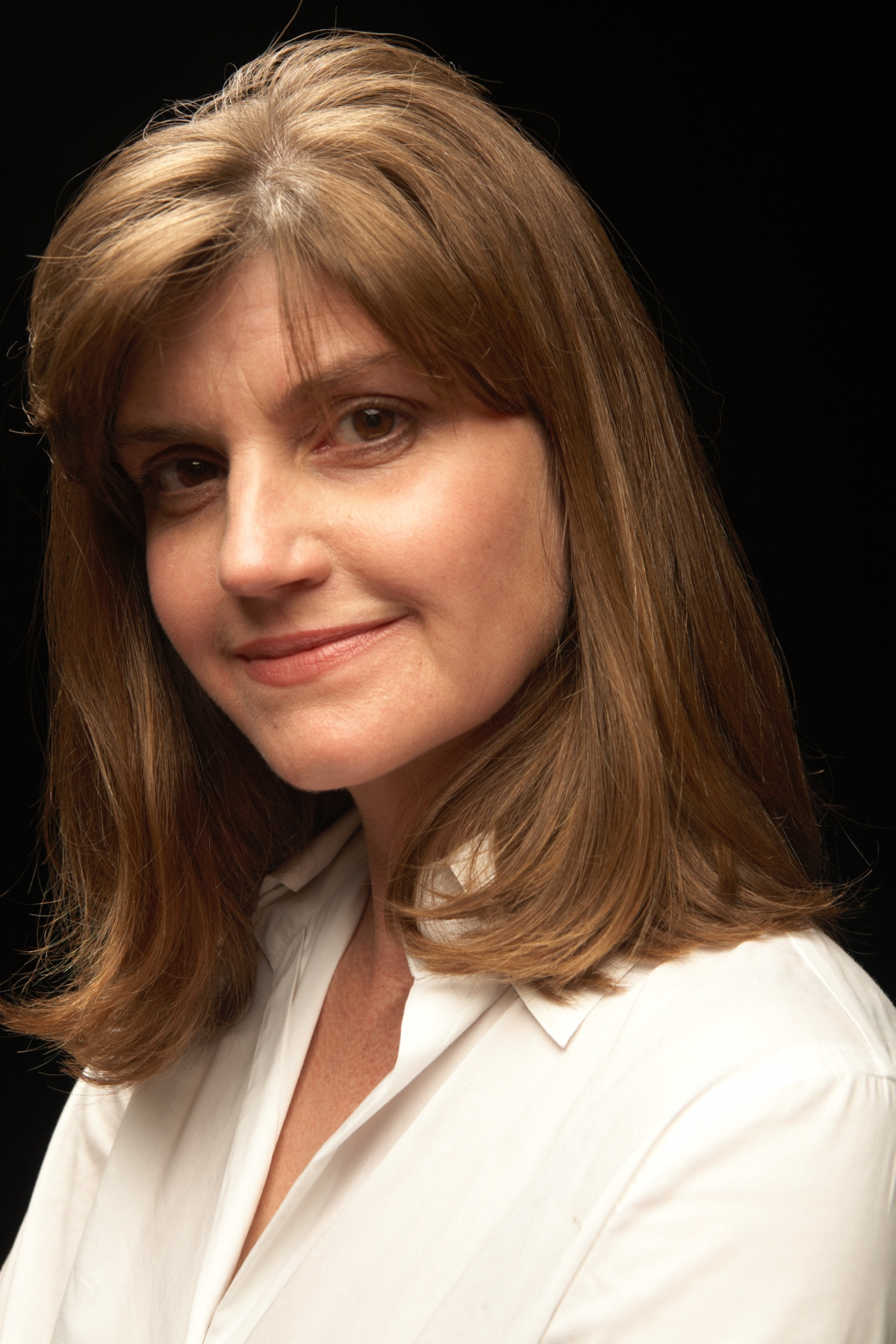
Desiree Thompson Sayle
Director of Correspondence to the First Lady
(announced January 8, 2001)

Quincy Hicks
Director of Scheduling and Advance to the First Lady
(announced January 8, 2001)

Lea Berman
Residence Manager and Social Secretary
(announced January 16, 2001)

==== Second Lady's staff ====
Debra Dunn
Chief of Staff to the Second Lady
(announced January 16, 2001)

Margita Thompson
Press Secretary to the Second Lady
(announced January 16, 2001)

Jona Turner
Second Lady's Director of Scheduling and Advance
(announced January 16, 2001)

== Aftermath ==
The adoption of the Electoral Count Reform and Presidential Transition Improvement Act of 2022 amended the Presidential Transition Act to now enable the GSA administrator to provide transition funds to multiple "apparent successful candidates" if more than one candidate has not conceded within five days of the election.

=== Assessments ===
In a January 28, 2001 New York Times article, correspondent Richard L. Berke wrote,

As President Bush completes his first week in office, prominent Republicans and even many Democrats agree that he has presided over one of the most orderly and politically nimble White House transitions in at least 20 years.

In a 2020 article for CNN, history professor Thomas Balcerski named the transition between Clinton and George W. Bush (as well as the presidential transition of Abraham Lincoln and the presidential transition of Franklin D. Roosevelt) as an example of a "terrible" presidential transition "that hurt America". He cited the extended uncertainty of the election outcome, withholding of GSA funding, and allegations of vandalism and pranks by outgoing staff.

== See also ==
- George W. Bush 2000 presidential campaign
- First inauguration of George W. Bush
