= Michelle Obama: A Life =

2025 biography by Michelle Obama

- First edition
- Author: Peter Slevin
- Language: English
- Genre: Biography
- Published: 2015 (Alfred A. Knopf)
- Publication place: United States
- ISBN: 978-0307958822

Michelle Obama: A Life is a biography of American former First Lady and lawyer Michelle Obama written by Peter Slevin. The book was first published by Alfred A. Knopf in 2015.

The book has received reviews from publications including The New York Times, Chicago Tribune, The Wall Street Journal, Publishers Weekly, Kirkus Reviews, Elle, Pittsburgh Post-Gazette, NBC News, USA Today, Booklist, Time, and The Washington Post.

In 2015, the book was a finalist for the PEN/Jacqueline Bograd Weld Award.
