= Martha Joynt Kumar =

American political scientist

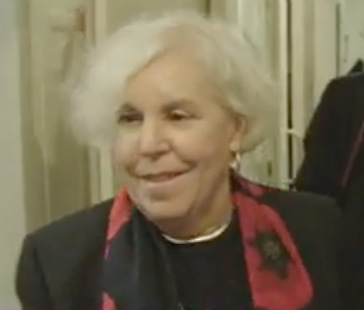
- Giving a tour of the White House press corps offices in 2017
- Occupation: Political scientist

Martha Joynt Kumar is an American political scientist. She is professor emerita of Political Science at Towson University and currently serves as the director of the White House Transition Project, a nonpartisan nonprofit formed of scholars of the American presidency who prepare information for incoming White House staff.

== Early life and education ==
Martha Joynt Kumar was raised in the Washington D.C. area. She attended independent preparatory school St. Agnes School before attending Connecticut College, where she earned a BA in government. Kumar then earned an MA in political science from Columbia University. After earning her masters degree, she taught at Tennessee State University and worked as a researcher for the Election Unit of NBC News. Kumar later returned to Columbia to earn her PhD in political science.

== Work ==
Kumar has authored several books on the presidency and the press. In 1981 she coauthored the book Portraying the President: The White House and the News Media alongside Michael Grossman. The book analyzed the relationship between mass media and the Office of the President. In 2015, Kumar published the book Before the Oath: How George W. Bush and Barack Obama Managed a Transfer of Power. In 2008, Kumar's book Managing the President’s Message: The White House Communications Operation won the Richard E. Neustadt Award for Best Book on the Presidency.

In 2018, Kumar received the President's Award from the White House Correspondent's Association.

In 2019, Kumar published a report on presidents' interactions with reporters, titled Six Presidents and Their Interchanges with Reporters at 30 Months: 892 Days into an Administration.
