= Muneer Satter =

American businessperson

- Born: December 21, 1960 (age 65)
- Citizenship: United States
- Education: Northwestern University; Harvard Law School; Harvard Graduate School of Business Administration
- Children: 5
- Website: satterfoundation.com

Muneer A. Satter (born December 21, 1960) is an American investor and philanthropist. Satter is the founder and chairman of Satter Investment Management, a private investment firm and family office.

Satter also founded the Satter Foundation in 1997 to support education, human rights, democracy, job creation, veterans, and preservation of the environment.

Satter serves as vice-chairman of the Goldman Sachs Foundation and Goldman Sachs Navy SEAL Foundation, and the Accelerate Institute. He is on the advisory council of The Elders. He is also a trustee of the U.S. Olympic & Paralympic Foundation.

== Early life and education ==
Satter was raised in Houston, Texas, where he grew up in a middle-class family. His first job was as a waiter at Steak 'n Shake.

Patricia Templeton, Satter's mother, went to Berea, which was the first integrated college in the South. In the 1950s, she was a civil rights activist in the Deep South. His father, Abdus Satter, emigrated from India to the United States to attend graduate school on a scholarship at Colorado School of Mines and the University of Oklahoma, where he earned a Ph.D in petroleum engineering.

Satter attended Westchester High School. He left Texas to attend Northwestern University, where he earned a B.A. in economics. Satter is also a graduate of Harvard Law School and Harvard Graduate School of Business Administration.

== Career ==
=== Satter Investment Management ===
Satter started and manages Satter Investment Management (SIM), based in Chicago, Illinois whose stated objective is to help create and grow companies that will make a significant impact on the state of health care.

=== Goldman Sachs ===
Satter retired from Goldman Sachs in 2012, where he worked for 24 years, including 16 years as a partner.

Satter joined Goldman in 1988, moving to London in 1992 to start-up and co-head the firm's European Merchant Banking Group. In 1997, he returned to the U.S., where he became global head of the firm's Goldman Sachs Mezzanine Group (GSMP), raising more than $30 billion in capital. Satter is credited with growing GSMP into the largest mezzanine fund in the world. Satter was also a senior member of the Investment Committee and chairman of the Risk Committee for the Merchant Banking Division, which at the time had over $80 billion of assets under management.

== Philanthropy ==
The American Dream is achieved when there is equal opportunity — that is the core underpinning of the American Dream. It is hard to get an equal opportunity if you don't receive an equal education. The reality is that some people receive better education because of where they live, where they were born and as a result of their economic circumstances. And for some of our citizens, it is the opposite, creating two separate and unequal worlds, and that is not OK and cannot be allowed to continue.

— Interview with Muneer Satter, May 10, 2016.

=== The Satter Foundation ===
Satter is a philanthropist, who together with his former wife, Kristen Hayler Hertel, has made grants of more than $50 million through their family foundation, the Satter Foundation, since its inception in 1997.

=== Education ===
Inspired by his parents, Satter became a supporter of education reform initiatives focused on improving education options, especially for students in disadvantaged neighborhoods in Chicago. Satter has donated funds for charter schools, scholarships and teacher training programs. Examples include KIPP Ascend, Perspectives Charter Schools, New Schools for Chicago, Academy for Urban School Leadership (AUSL), Accelerate Institute, Golden Apple Foundation, Family Focus, Beyond Sports, Pathways in Education, Invest for Kids Chicago, Teach for America, Noble Network, Chicago Community Trust and The Ounce of Prevention.

=== Accelerate Institute ===
Satter serves on the board of Accelerate Institute. The Accelerate Institute was founded by Patrick G. Ryan, Jr and provides leadership training for school principals.

=== The Elders ===
Satter serves on the advisory council of The Elders. The Elders were founded by Nelson Mandela in 2007 and are independent global leaders working together for peace and human rights.

=== Northwestern University ===
The Satter Foundation has committed more than $10 million to finance scholarships to Northwestern University's Feinberg School of Medicine. The scholarships pay all tuition for a student's first three years of medical school.

The Satter Foundation also funds Project Excite, founded at the Northwestern School of Education to close the achievement gap between minority and non-minority students at Evanston High School in Illinois. The project runs education, academic advising and personal education programs designed to improve access for minority students and help them earn admission to college.

A Northwestern alumnus, Satter serves on the school's board of trustees and was chairman of its finance committee from 2018 to 2020. Northwestern University has $11 billion in assets and an operating budget of over $2.5 billion per year. Satter serves on the board of the Northwestern Medical Group, which has over 1,000 doctors and over $1 billion of revenue.

=== Navy SEAL Foundation ===
Satter serves on the board of the Navy SEAL Foundation, which provides immediate and ongoing support to the Naval Special Warfare (NSW) community. He started an annual fundraiser for the organization in Chicago, raising more than $5 million in 2017.

=== The Nature Conservancy ===
The Satter Foundation has been a consistent supporter of The Nature Conservancy (TNC) including seven years as treasurer and chairman of its finance committee.

TNC is one of the largest environmental non-profits in the world with more than $6 billion in assets—including a $2 billion endowment and capital fund—and operations in more than 35 countries. Satter served from 2006 to 2015 on TNC's board of trustees, including seven years as chairman of its finance committee.

=== Room to Read ===
The Satter Foundation is a longtime supporter of Room to Read, which has opened over 38,000 schools and libraries, distributed over 25 million books and sponsored over 100,000 Girl Scholars. The organization works in 17 countries across the developing world. Satter served as co-chairman of Room to Read's board from 2005 to 2008, and is a long-time friend to the organization's Founder, John Wood.

=== Goldman Sachs Foundation ===
Satter is vice-chairman of the board of the Goldman Sachs Foundation and GS Gives. The Goldman Sachs Foundation organizes and supports 10,000 Women and 10,000 Small Businesses. 10,000 Women is a global initiative that fosters economic growth by providing women entrepreneurs in developing nations around the world with a business and management education, mentoring, networking and access to capital. 10,000 Small Businesses assists entrepreneurs in the U.S. and U.K. to create jobs and economic opportunity by providing a practical business education, a network of support and access to capital.

U.S. Olympic & Paralympic Foundation

Satter is a trustee with the U.S. Olympic & Paralympic Foundation. The U.S. Olympic & Paralympic Foundation is a 501(c)(3) nonprofit that serves as the primary source of philanthropic support for Team USA. Founded in 2013, the USOPF generates critical financial resources that help Team USA athletes reach their full potential, both on and off the field of play. One hundred percent of gifts to the foundation go directly to athletes and the high-performance programming that supports them.

== Shannon Sedgwick Davis ==
Satter supported Shannon Sedgwick Davis' efforts by contributing to the Bridgeway Foundation in order to stop the Lord's Resistance Army (LRA). As a result of Davis' efforts, there has been an over 95% reduction in killings by the LRA, down from 706 civilians in 2010 to 7 civilians in 2018. Thousands of children who were child soldiers or sex slaves have been freed and are rebuilding their shattered lives.

== Politics and public affairs ==
Satter is a donor and fundraiser for political candidates who support economic growth and job creation. Satter is a Member of the Council on Foreign Relations and the Chicago Council on Global Affairs. Satter serves on the advisory board of the American Enterprise Institute.

Satter was a National Finance co-chairman for Mitt Romney's effort in 2008 and 2012.

In 2015, Crain's Chicago Business named Satter one of "The 20 Most Powerful Political Insiders in Illinois."

== Personal ==
Satter was married to Kristen Hayler Hertel, who he met while attending Northwestern University. They have 5 children.
