= Alagappa =

Alagappa may refer to:

- Alagappa (given name), an Indian male given name
- Alagappa Chettiar (1909–1957), Indian businessman and philanthropist
  - Alagappa Chettiar College of Engineering and Technology
  - Alagappa College of Technology, a college in India
  - Alagappa Polytechnic, a college in India
    - Alagappa University Evening College, Rameswaram, a college in Rameswaram, Tamil Nadu, India
- Alagappa Nagar, a village in Kerala, India

== See also ==
- Alagappan, an Indian surname
