= Fatema Akbari =

Afghan entrepreneur and women's advocate (born 1974)

Fatema Akbari فاطمه اکبری
- Born: 1974 (age 51–52); Daykundi, Republic of Afghanistan
- Education: American University of Afghanistan
- Awards: 10,000 Women Entrepreneurial Achievement Award

Fatema Akbari (Dari: فاطمه اکبری; born 1974) is an Afghan and ethnic Hazara entrepreneur and women's rights advocate who is the founder of the Gulistan Sadaqat Company and non-governmental organization the Women Affairs Council. In 2011, she received the 10,000 Women Entrepreneurial Achievement Award.

== Career ==
Fatema Akbari was driven into carpentry by necessity as a means of supporting her children following the death of her husband in 1999, originally working on building sites in Iran, where her family fled when the Taliban took control of Afghanistan. In 2003, she returned to the homeland and started furniture manufacturing business by establishing Gulistan Sadaqat Company in Kabul with a carpentry school. She attempted to provide a workforce base as a means of earning to wives of men killed or disabled during the conflict in Afghanistan. In 2009, she enrolled in the Goldman Sachs-sponsored 10,000 Women program at the American University of Afghanistan, a program aimed at training women from developing countries in business and management.

In expanding her operations and women's literacy classes, Akbari has been able to work in Taliban-controlled areas through negotiations with local leaders and has commented "It would be good for the Taliban to be involved in the country, to see that there’s nothing wrong with women leaving the house."

In 2004, Fatema Akbari founded Afghanistan NGO the Women Affairs Council to train women in handicrafts in addition to educating both sexes about human rights. Between the NGO and her own business, it was estimated that as of 2011 she had trained 5,610 people across Afghanistan.

== 10,000 Women Entrepreneurial Achievement Award ==
On 12 April 2011, Akbari was honored with the 10,000 Women Entrepreneurial Achievement Award at the Global Leadership Awards. In presenting, Vital Voices commended her

"for her work to empower other Afghan women — through the training and employment provided by her carpentry business, and through the literacy and skills training provided by her non-governmental organization (NGO) to women in Taliban-controlled areas."

== Further work ==
During 30–31 March 2011, Akbari was a panel member at a 2-day conference in Dallas, Texas convened by former United States President George W. Bush and Afghan President Hamid Karzai entitled Building Afghanistan’s Future: Promoting Women’s Freedom and Advancing Their Economic Opportunity.

== See also ==
- List of Hazara people
- 10,000 Women
- Vital Voices
