= Former Residence of Chiang Ching-kuo (Hangzhou) =

Villa on the north shore of the West Lake in Hangzhou, China

- 蒋经国旧居
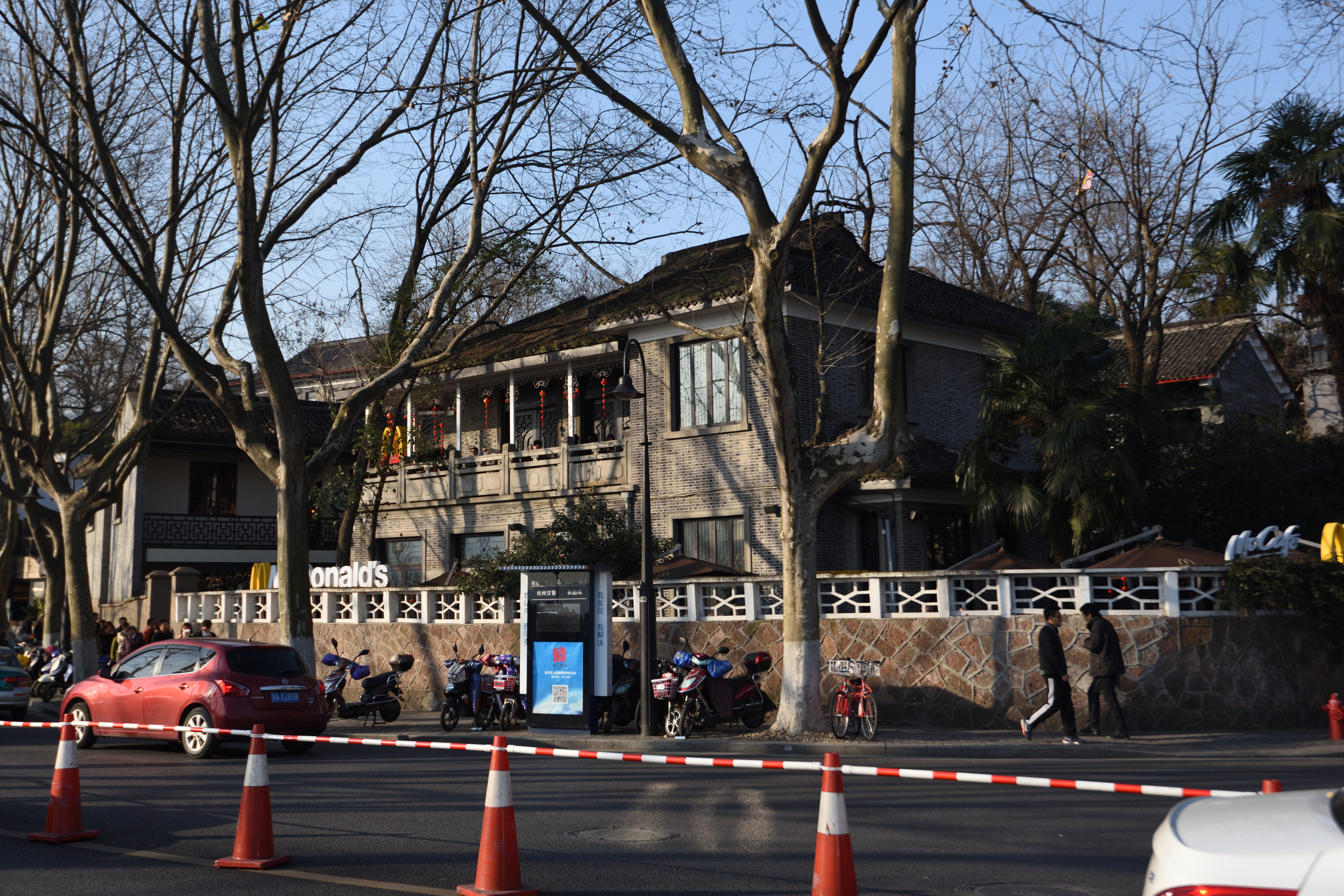
- The exterior of the villa in February 2017
- Interactive map of the Former Residence of Chiang Ching-kuo area

General information
- Status: Protected as a provincial historic site
- Location: 7 Shihan Road, Xihu District, Hangzhou, Zhejiang, China, Hangzhou, China
- Coordinates: 30°15′42.5″N 120°08′51.5″E
- Current tenants: McDonald's, Starbucks
- Construction started: 1929
- Completed: 1931
- Owner: Zhejiang Provincial Government Offices Administration

Technical details
- Floor count: 3

Design and construction
- Known for: Residence of Chiang Ching-kuo and his family from 1947 to 1948

Other information
- Number of rooms: 14 (main building) + 7 (side building)
- Number of restaurants: 2

The Former Residence of Chiang Ching-kuo (Wade–Giles) or Jiang Jingguo (pinyin) is a wood and brick western-style villa on the north shore of the West Lake in Hangzhou, China. After the World War 2, the villa was once made the home of Chiang Ching-kuo, who later became the president of Republic of China in Taiwan, and his wife Chiang Fang-liang before they fled to Taiwan in 1949. The villa, echoing the Chenglu villa of his father Chiang Kai-shek and stepmother Soong Mei-ling on the south shore of the Inner West Lake, has also served as home to several important figures in the Chinese history, including Li Shiqun, Huang Yuan, Chen Jiangong, Feng Baiju. Currently, the residence is protected as a provincial historic site, though a McDonald's and a Starbucks operate within the villa since 2015 which has led to controversy.

== History ==
The villa was first constructed by a Shanghai tobacconist named Wang Xiangehng, who bought the land in the late 1920s. At a price of 8,000 to 10,000 Chinese silver yuan, the land was reported to be the most expensive in the local history of Hangzhou at the time of Wang's purchase. When the villa was built in 1931, it was numbered 1 and 2 Inner West Lake. Later it became the home to Li Shiqun, the head of the secret police of the Japanese puppet government in China, as the building was close to the Japanese consulate in Hangzhou located in 1 Shihan Road. After the World War 2, the villa was confiscated according to the law penalising Hanjian or traitors to the Chinese people.

In 1947, Chiang Ching-kuo was appointed to rid Shanghai of corruption and began to live in the 2 Yicun villa in Shanghai. Meanwhile, his family, including his wife Chiang Fang-liang, his son Chiang Hsiao-wen and his daughter Chiang Hsiao-chang moved into the residence provided by then Hangzhou mayor Zhou Xiangxian. During the time, Hsiao-wen studied at Huilan Middle School, and Hsiao-chang studied at Hongdao Girl's High School. After Chiang Ching-kuo quitted his job in Shanghai in November 1948, he first moved to the residence and then moved to Xikou two days later.

After 1949, the residence was numbered 24 and 25 Beishan Road, and then re-numbered as 7 Shihan Road that we see today. It is owned by the Zhejiang Provincial Government Offices Administration. The villa was made home to writer Huang Yuan, mathematician Chen Jiangong, Communist fighters Feng Baiju. In 1955, it was the place where the Publicity Department of the Zhejiang Provincial Committee of the Chinese Communist Party adapted the Kunqu Fifteen Guan. From 1988 to 2004, the communist secret agent Wang Lifu lived in the villa. In 2003, the villa became protected as a city historic site of Hangzhou.

Since 2015, the main building of the villa transformed into a McDonald's restaurant, while a Starbucks began to operate in the side building, which led to controversy. Demos Chiang, the grandson of Chiang Ching-kuo said that he couldn't accept that a McDonald's operates in the building and requested his agreement to display his grandfather's photos, thus withdrawing from the commercialisation project. In 2017, the villa became protected as a provincial historic site of Zhejiang.

== Architecture ==
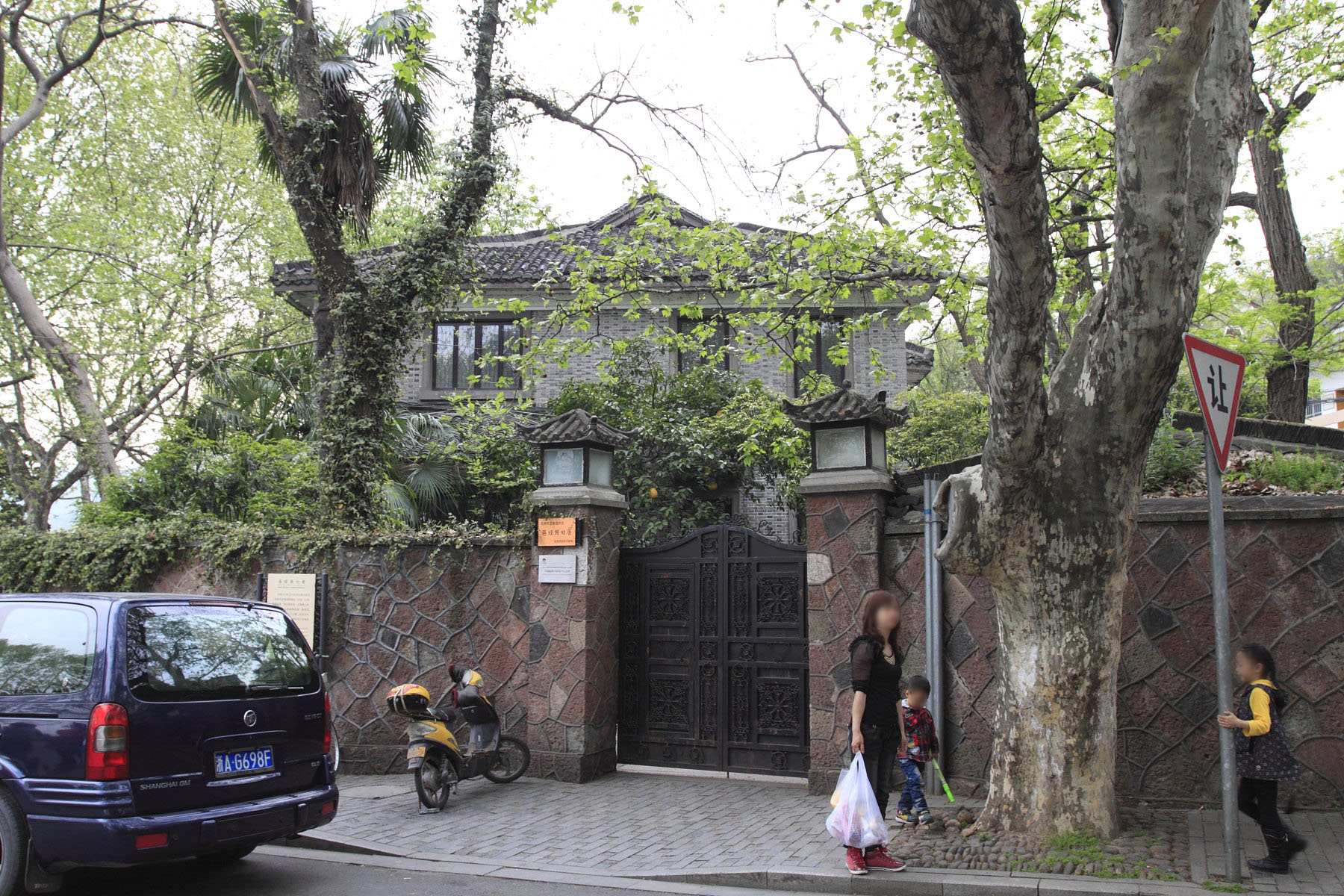
The east gate before commercialisation

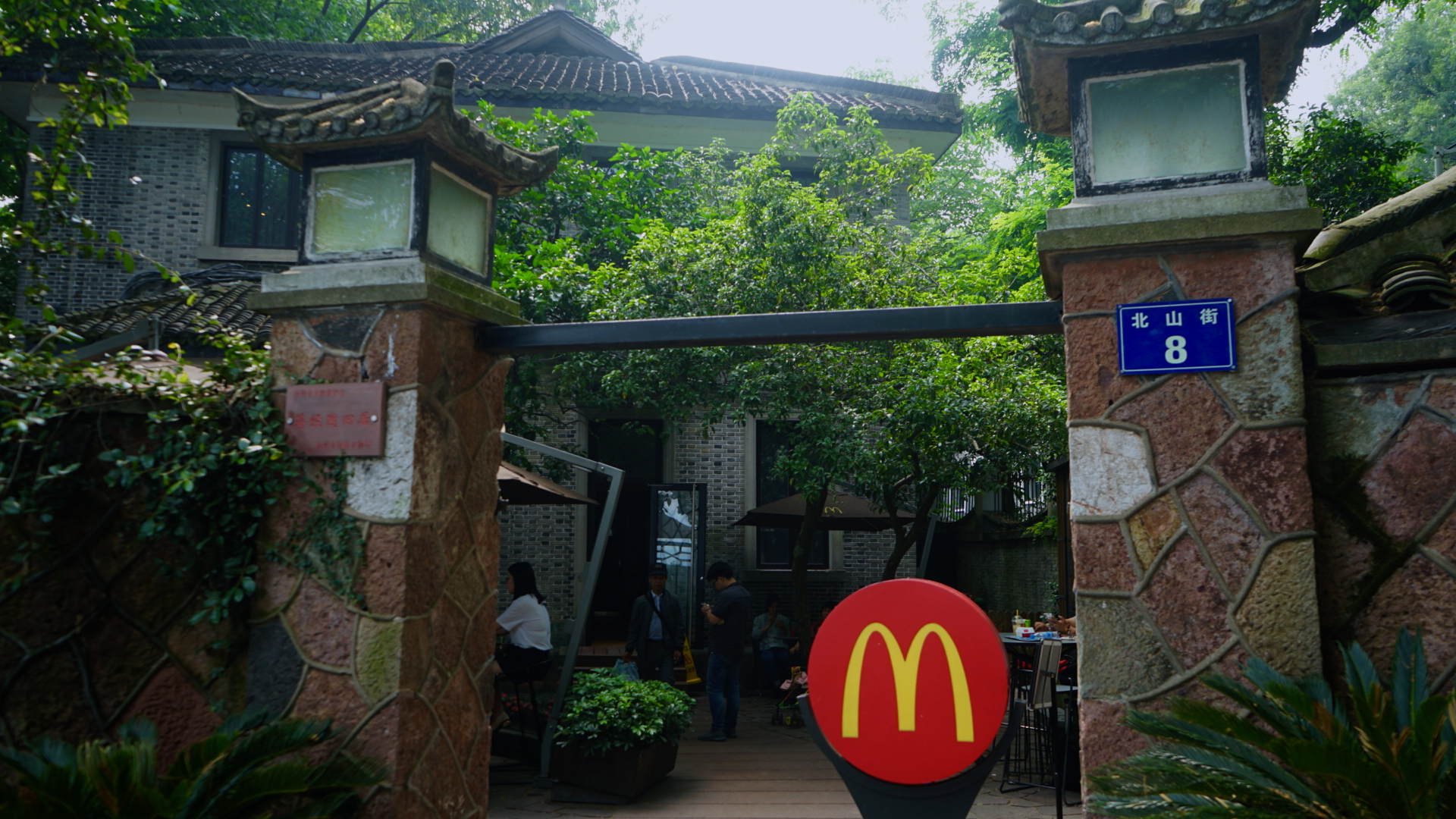
The east gate to the residence

The villa is a two storey building made of wood and brick, oriented towards the Inner West Lake at the foot of Baoshi Hill, covering a land of 1333.3 square metres. The main building is western-styled and has 14 rooms, with a total room size 344 square metres. The side building is Chinese styled and has 7 rooms, with a total room size 204 square metres, which is connected to the main building with a corridor, yet the corridor is currently blocked.

The fence wall is made of red or brown bricks, while the exterior wall of the building is made of a kind of Chinese green bricks produced by the Shanghai Ni Zengmao Brick Kiln. The corridors in the building are paved with teakwood flooring. The interior wall bricks are pointed with imported cements. The windows and doors are made of American red pine wood. The floor plates are made of granolithic concrete aggregates with copper wires.

== Commercialisation and controversy ==
On 14 January 2015, the Hangzhou Gardens & Cultural Relics Bureau published a notice that the McDonald's would open up a restaurant at 8 Beishan Road. Though the notice was viewed by over 100, but most people criticised the plan. On 26 January, the plan published its environmental impact assessment, after which the local newspaper Qianjiang Evening News used a full page to cover the plan, which then led to controversy among the public, as many locals believed this to be Western cultural desecration, though local officials confirmed that this doesn't violate the law. On 19 April, Zhejiang News revealed that Demos Chiang was involved in the plan, which was later denied by hin while responding to the United Daily News. Demos Chiang criticised the commercialisation plan, doubting the law regarding local historical reservation.

In November 2015, a Starbucks and a McDonald's were set up and started to operate within the building. McDonald's responded to CNBC that it would respect and preserve the history of the site.

== See also ==
- Chiang Ching-kuo
- West Lake
