= Scene Onnu Nammude Veedu =

2012 Malayalam film

- Directed by: Shyju Anthikkad
- Written by: Shylesh Divakaran
- Produced by: K. K. Narayandas; Jins Puliparambil
- Starring: Lal; Navya Nair; Thilakan; Asif Ali; Malavika; Shritha Sivadas; Lalu Alex; Harisree Ashokan
- Cinematography: Alagappan
- Edited by: Saajan V
- Music by: Ratheesh Vegha
- Distributed by: Ramya Movies
- Release date: 23 November 2012
- Country: India
- Language: Malayalam

Scene Onnu Nammude Veedu is a 2012 Indian Malayalam-language film directed by Shyju Anthikkad.The film was a moderate commercial success.

== Background ==
The story was written by assistant director Ottappalam Unni. Lal plays the character of Ottapalam Unni and Navya Nair returned to Malayalam cinema as the character Manju, a mother, whose world is her son.This movie features one of the scenes in Malayalam cinema that required the highest number of retakes. The scene where Navya Nair bathes 'Master' Priyadarshan took 42 takes to complete. K. K. Narayanadas produced the movie. It is one of the final films which Thilakan appeared in.

== Cast ==
- Lal as Ottappalam Unni
- Asif Ali as himself (Extended Cameo Appearance )
- Navya Nair as Manju
- Master Priyadarshan as Kannan
- Thilakan as Vishwan (Dubbed by his son Shobi Thilakan)
- Lalu Alex as K. K. Jose
- Shritha Sivadas as Parvathy
- Harisree Ashokan as Bhasi
- Riyaz Khan as Amal
- Sudheesh
- Raghavan
- Kalabhavan Shajohn
- Sadiq
- Sunil Sukhada
- Shivaji Guruvayoor as Rajan
- Manikuttan as Rafique
- Ambika Mohan as Shyama Teacher
- Augustine as Manju's Father
- Shammi Thilakan
- Sasi Kalinga
- Kalabhavan Haneef
- Majeed
- Thajudheen Vadakara as Director Firoz khan
- Malavika Nair as Film Actress
- Anjali Nair as Tv Reporter
- Maya Moushmi as Manju's Friend
- Urmila Unni as K. K. Jose's wife
- Swapna Menon as K. K. Jose's daughter

== Soundtrack ==
Music is composed by Ratheesh Vega and lyrics by Rafeeq Ahmed.

- "Aakasham Malli" – Arun Alat
- "Ee Maruveedhiyil" – Pradeep Chandrakumar
- "Cinema Cinema" – Rahul Nambiar
- "Ninne Thedi" – Sanidhavi Haricharan

== Reception ==
One reviewer said, "The plot is borrowed from at least a dozen films made on the same theme. Yet, it is the charm of the lead pair that holds our attention."
