= Dina Powell =

Egyptian-American financial & political advisor (born 1973)

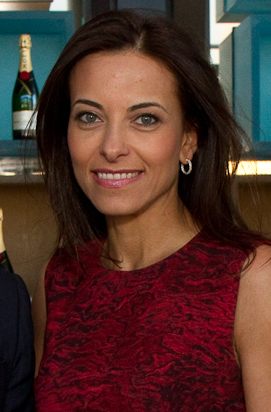

1st United States Deputy National Security Advisor for Strategy
- In office March 15, 2017 – January 12, 2018
- President: Donald Trump
- Preceded by: Position established
- Succeeded by: Nadia Schadlow

11th Assistant Secretary of State for Educational and Cultural Affairs
- In office July 11, 2005 – June 7, 2007
- President: George W. Bush
- Preceded by: Patricia Harrison
- Succeeded by: Goli Ameri

Director of the White House Presidential Personnel Office
- In office 2003–2005
- President: George W. Bush
- Preceded by: Clay Johnson III
- Succeeded by: Liza Wright

Personal details
- Born: Dina Habib; June 12, 1973 (age 53) Cairo, Egypt
- Party: Republican
- Spouses: Richard Powell (m. 1998; div. 2017); Dave McCormick (m. 2019)
- Children: 2
- Education: University of Texas, Austin (BA)

Dina Powell, also known as Dina Powell McCormick (née Habib, Arabic: دينا حبيب; born June 12, 1973), is an Egyptian-American financial executive, philanthropist, and political advisor, best known for having been the United States Deputy National Security Advisor for Strategy to President Donald Trump. She is the current president and vice chair of the social media and technology company Meta.

Born in Cairo, Egypt, she came to the United States as a child. A lifelong member of the Republican Party, she became involved in Texas-oriented Republican politics during and following her time at the University of Texas at Austin. During the George W. Bush administration, Powell served in several roles, first as an Assistant to the President for Presidential Personnel and then as Assistant Secretary of State for Educational and Cultural Affairs and Deputy Undersecretary of State for Public Affairs and Public Diplomacy. In 2007, Powell joined Goldman Sachs, where she became a managing director (Note: Managing directors at the firm are promoted biannually, it is a middle management position and they are not equivalent to a CEO.) and eventually a partner at the firm, as well as president of its non-profit subsidiary, the Goldman Sachs Foundation. In that capacity she ran the foundation's 10,000 Women program.

Powell joined the Trump administration during the transition period 2016/2017 and remained thereafter. As a Deputy National Security Advisor she had a role in determining the first year of the administration's foreign policy, especially in regard to Middle East policy. She was also an Assistant to the President and Senior Counselor for Economic Initiatives, a position – demanding about 20 percent of her time – that continued after her security appointment.

She left the administration in early 2018, returning to work for Goldman Sachs, where she was a Partner and served on the Management Committee. In October 2018, Powell was a leading candidate for the position of United States Ambassador to the United Nations, but withdrew from consideration and remained with the financial firm. In 2022 she was named the new chair of the Robin Hood Foundation, to begin in 2023. Powell departed Goldman Sachs in 2023 to join BDT & MSD Partners. Powell was a board member of Meta Platforms from April to December 2025, resigning without specifying a reason, before being named president and vice chair of the company in January 2026.

== Early life and education ==
Dina Habib was born in Cairo, Egypt to a middle-class, Coptic Christian family. Her father was a captain in the Egyptian Army, and her mother had attended American University in Cairo. Her parents brought her younger sister and her to the United States as children. Habib arrived knowing no English.

The Habib family settled in Dallas, Texas, where they had relatives within the Coptic community. The parents ran a convenience store, and her father also worked at times as a bus driver and in real estate, while her mother sometimes pursued a career in social work. A third daughter was born once the family was in North America.

Habib learned English at school, but her family insisted that she be raised with Egyptian culture and language, hence, she is fluent in Arabic. Of her parents' actions, she later said, "I so desperately wanted a turkey and cheese sandwich with potato chips, and instead I always got grape leaves and hummus and falafel, not even in a cool brown paper bag. And now, of course, I appreciate so much that I did." Each of the family members born abroad became a naturalized citizen of the United States. She attended the prep school for girls Ursuline Academy of Dallas, from which she was graduated in 1991.

She then attended the University of Texas at Austin College of Liberal Arts where she enrolled in the Plan II Honors program. She performed community service as part of her program and joined the Delta Delta Delta sorority.

Habib helped pay for school by working as a legislative assistant for two Republican members of the Texas State Senate: Ike Harris and Jerry E. Patterson. With them, she worked on a number of policy matters, including juvenile justice reform. Her family strongly identified with the Republican Party and greatly admired Ronald Reagan. She adopted the same views, later recalling that "... when I started to work with Republicans I realised that I agree with the views of personal empowerment, of less government involvement, of having the ability to talk about things without the government necessarily being involved. And on the economic side I'm definitely a believer that people should spend more of their money and spend it the way they think so and invest it wisely."

For her honors thesis, she wrote about the value of mentoring juvenile delinquents. She graduated from the University of Texas with honors with a bachelor's degree in humanities from its College of Liberal Arts in 1995.

== Early political career ==
Habib had applied to, and had been accepted by, a law school. However, in part due to her Arabic fluency, she received an offer of a year-long internship with the U.S. Senator from Texas, Kay Bailey Hutchison. She deferred the school and accepted the internship, moving to Washington, D.C. in the process. She never returned to law school.

After the year-long internship concluded, she took a job with Dick Armey, the Republican Majority Leader in the U.S. House of Representatives. There, she worked as a member of his leadership staff. This role lasted four years.

After that, she took a job with the Republican National Committee where she was Director of Congressional Affairs and helped to find positions for Republicans in lobbying firms. As part of this role she became involved in the George W. Bush presidential campaign, 2000.

== First marriage and family ==
Powell married Richard C. Powell on January 10, 1998. A public relations professional, he became a managing director of the Washington-based Quinn Gillespie & Associates and later became employed by Teneo as the president of Teneo Strategy. After the marriage, she began using his last name professionally.

The couple had two daughters, born in 2001 and 2006. In 2007 the couple had purchased a $3.85 million condominium apartment on the Upper East Side of Manhattan.

== Bush administration ==
=== White House Personnel Office ===
While working at the RNC, Powell was spotted by Clay Johnson III, who would come to be in charge of hiring for the George W. Bush administration. The day after the election Johnson called Powell regarding the presidential transition. Once in office, Johnson took her on as a Deputy Assistant to the President for Presidential Personnel.

Beginning in January 2003, Johnson moved up and elsewhere in the administration and Powell took on his role, thereby serving as the Assistant to the President for Presidential Personnel, a senior staff position at the White House. In this role, she was responsible for assisting the President on the appointments of the cabinet, subcabinet and ambassadorial positions across the U.S. Government. She had a staff of 35 reporting to her; once the second term of the Bush presidency began in January 2005, was part of hiring some 4,000 people. She participated in some of the recommendations process as well as processing the applications. At age 29, she was the youngest person ever to hold this position.

Some of the recommendations she made for the U.S. State Department put her in good stead with Secretary of State Condoleezza Rice.

=== Department of State ===
In March 2005, Powell was nominated as Assistant Secretary of State for Educational and Cultural Affairs, an assignment that included becoming an ambassador to the Arabic-speaking world. News of the nomination landed on the front page of Al-Ahram and made her notable in Egypt. Powell served in that position from July 11, 2005, through June 6, 2007. Powell was also designated by Secretary Rice to the office of Deputy Undersecretary of State for Public Diplomacy and Public Affairs. In addition, Powell led the Bureau of Educational and Cultural Affairs, in whose responsibility fell the Fulbright Program and similar foreign endeavors. In her role, Powell traveled worldwide with Secretary Rice, but mostly focused on going to the Middle East.

During this period, Powell established several public-private partnerships between American corporations and foreign entities, including a U.S.-Lebanon partnership in the wake of the 2006 war that sought to help rebuild the local economy. These may have been under the protection of the Middle East Partnership Initiative. She helped create some cultural exchanges between the United States and the Islamic Republic of Iran, including Iranian doctors coming west and a U.S. wrestling team going east. She was also responsible for bringing in scholars from other nation-states. Powell worked to establish the Fortune/U.S. State Department Global Women's Mentoring Partnership, which connected up-and-coming female leaders with the community of Fortune's Most Powerful Women Summit, a joint venture between the State Department and Fortune magazine that received praise over the next decade.

In 2007, she left the White House and government service, saying "It's the right time for me and my family." She had been the highest-ranking Arab-American in the Bush administration. The Washington Post assessed that Dina Habib Powell had "played a critical role in the administration's efforts to bolster public diplomacy in the face of the wave of anti-Americanism that has swept the Arab world since the U.S. invasion of Iraq." Powell would later join the Advisory Council of the George W. Bush Presidential Center.

== Goldman Sachs ==
Powell joined Goldman Sachs in 2007 as a managing director, having been hired by John F. W. Rogers, a longtime Goldman figure with experience with past Republican administrations. Powell was then named partner in 2010. Powell has conceded that she joined Goldman Sachs despite having no background in the subject of finance; she has said that her entire career has been guided by the notion of not planning a lot but rather "just taking that leap of faith."

Powell oversaw the firm's impact investing business and served as the president of the Goldman Sachs Foundation beginning in 2010. This was in addition to her responsibilities as global head of the Office of Corporate Engagement and a member of the Goldman Sachs Partnership Committee.

As the leader of Goldman Sachs Impact Investing, Powell was responsible for a business with more than $4 billion in housing and community development investments across the United States.

In her role as president of the Goldman Sachs Foundation, Powell led one of the world's largest corporate foundations. Powell helped build and was responsible for all the Foundation's initiatives supporting and developing entrepreneurs around the world, including 10,000 Women and 10,000 Small Businesses. 10,000 Women provides women entrepreneurs in developing countries with business education, access to capital and mentors. Under Powell, Goldman Sachs partnered with International Finance Corporation and Overseas Private Investment Corporation to raise 600 million dollars to provide access to capital for more than 100,000 women worldwide. To realize this project, Powell worked closely with the State Department.

Powell also led Goldman Sachs Gives, a fund established in 2007 and structured as a vehicle to consolidate Goldman Sachs partners' charitable giving.

During her time at Goldman Sachs, Powell joined the boards of directors or trustees of Harvard Kennedy School's Social Enterprise Initiative, the American University in Cairo, the Center for Global Development, Vital Voices, and the Nightingale-Bamford School. Powell is listed as a member of the Council on Foreign Relations and a member of the Trilateral Commission.

Powell has worked with Democrats such as Obama administration advisors Valerie Jarrett and Gene Sperling.

== Trump administration ==
=== Senior advisor ===
Powell had no relationship with the incoming President or his family until after the 2016 United States presidential election. Powell received a call from Ivanka Trump, who was interested in the metrics by which the success of 10,000 Women had been judged. She thus became involved with the incoming administration's transition period, particularly with regard to the empowerment of women and girls and the potential of female entrepreneurship.

Starting January 20, 2017, Powell began serving as Senior Advisor to the President for Entrepreneurship, Economic Growth and the Empowerment of Women. In doing so she became one of the few Bush administration officials to join this new administration. Powell relocated from New York City to Washington as part of taking this job. Powell intended to only join the administration for one year. As part of this change of path she became divested of her interest in Goldman Sachs.

Powell led a joint American-Canadian program to advance the role of women in business, making reference to what was formally called the United States-Canada Council for the Advancement of Women Entrepreneurs and Business Leaders. This effort involved Canadian Prime Minister Justin Trudeau as well. Another Powell endeavor involved a listening session on the related topics of domestic and international human trafficking.

Powell was visible outside that scope of her role when she was part of a meeting between the president and the Saudi defense minister Mohammed bin Salman. She subsequently shared responsibility for overseeing a $200 billion amount of U.S.-Saudi arms deals. She continued to assist Ivanka Trump. Powell's network of contacts in the financial, corporate, and governmental worlds was considered a valuable asset for the new administration and she assisted in a few of the early hires.

Even after being appointed deputy national security advisor in March 2017, Powell still spent 20 percent of her time in this, her initial role.

In June 2017, Powell was a key advisor on a trip to Canada to improve economic issues with the nation.

Powell was on the short list for White House Chief of Staff to replace Reince Priebus. Ivanka and her husband were pushing for Powell. Reportedly the president was happy with Powell's performance so far and considered the idea, but in July 2017 chose Homeland Security Secretary and former General John F. Kelly.

=== National Security Council ===
On March 15, 2017, Powell was named to the post of Deputy National Security Advisor for Strategy, all the while retaining her economic position as well. The impetus for this assignment came from the recently named national security advisor, H. R. McMaster, who himself was responding to people outside the administration suggesting her name.

In April 2017 The New York Times labeled Powell a "rising star" in the national security establishment, an appellation echoed by Vogue magazine, while the Associated Press wrote that "Dina Powell has quietly established herself as a White House power." Additionally, The Washington Post wrote that "she is one of the most interesting figures in the new administration." In part this level of attention was because in that month, McMaster elevated the Deputy for Strategy position to a higher role within the NSC, meaning that Powell came to attend both the Principals Committee and National Security Council Deputies Committee. For her part, Powell assisted McMaster in his development of working relationships with various members of the Cabinet. In addition, Powell attempted to guide McMaster on the best ways to have useful interchanges with the chief executive himself.

Regarding the May 2017 report of a Donald Trump revelation of classified information to Russia, during which Powell was present in the room, she stated: "This story is false." However this soon-to-be infamous, unannounced meeting with the Russian Foreign Minister Sergei Lavrov and Ambassador Sergey Kislyak was as it happened where Trump was later revealed to have disclosed Israeli intelligence. While she dissembled to cover up the president's error, he later admitted to having revealed these secrets.

She was among the top officials escorting the chief executive on his first foreign trip, which in May 2017 started with a two-day stay in Saudi Arabia. She had been heavily involved in the planning for the Middle Eastern portion of the trip. She was involved in several negotiations with Middle Eastern parties, where she was sometimes the only woman at the table. She also ensured that one of the headliner speeches made reference to women's rights in Saudi Arabia. Powell's prior experience in government and her set of contacts in the Arab world played a key role in making the first part of the trip a successful venture, and she had done some of advance work prior to the trip.

Powell was one of the key figures in securing the release of Egyptian aid worker Aya Hijazi. In July 2017, she was one of those accompanying on the trip to Poland and Germany en toward the 2017 G20 Hamburg summit. She then went to the Middle East on the next Kushner peace process trip. This took place in late August 2017 and also made the involvement of envoy Jason Greenblatt. By this time the likes of Bannon and Gorka were gone from the White House while Powell was still an ascendant force there. The trip was viewed positively within the Administration, which continued to think that an Israeli-Palestinian peace deal was achievable. This was followed by a secret trip to the Middle East made by Kushner, Powell, and others. By November 2017 she was part of a "core four" drafting a plan for a comprehensive Middle East peace, along with Kushner, Greenblatt, and U.S. Ambassador to Israel David M. Friedman. Given that the other three were Orthodox Jews with various ties to Israel, Powell was the only native-born Egyptian.

A major accomplishment of Powell in December 2017, was the completion of the administration's National Security Strategy document. She worked on it intensively with McMaster and senior NSC staffer Nadia Schadlow. In doing so they talked with numerous national security experts and stakeholders as well as gaining the buy-in of Cabinet-level officials.

=== Departure ===
On December 8, 2017, it was announced that Powell would be leaving the administration in early 2018, subsequently elaborated to be after a delayed vice presidential trip to the Middle East had been initiated. Powell planned to return to her life in New York, with a goal of spending more time with her family.

White House spokesperson Sarah Huckabee Sanders stated that Powell is a "trusted advisor", said that Powell had only ever planned to stay for a year, and indicated that Powell would "continue to support the President's agenda and work on Middle East policy."

Four administration officials indicated that the decision to leave really was hers. Several officials viewed her departure as a significant loss for the White House. NSC staffer Nadia Schadlow was chosen to replace Powell.

=== Possibilities of returning ===
In October 2018, following the sudden resignation of Nikki Haley as U.S. Ambassador to the United Nations, Powell was reported to be one of the leading candidates to replace her. Indeed, the President said so explicitly, that she was under consideration among others. The possibility of appointing Powell faced significant opposition from some within the Administration, including Bolton. Some of the arguments against her revolved around her globalist orientations, with the allegation that she was not fully aligned with the president's "America First" approach. Also, Powell was reportedly leery of going through a likely contentious confirmation hearing before the United States Senate. Ultimately, Powell announced to friends the time was not right for her family or Goldman Sachs, and by October 11 she told the White House that she was withdrawing from consideration.

However, after picked Heather Nauert withdrew from consideration in February 2019 due to nanny issues, Powell's name once again emerged as a possible choice for the position. One report had her as one of the two leading candidates. However Kelly Knight Craft was chosen and it was unclear if Powell was ever interested or in serious consideration.

Also around this time, Powell was also considered to become the first female president of the World Bank. She was also under consideration for White House Chief of Staff.

== Harvard Kennedy School fellow ==
On February 12, 2018, it was announced that Powell would be joining the Belfer Center for Science and International Affairs within the bounds of the Harvard Kennedy School. Her mission would be to teach diplomacy and ideas and practices of foreign affairs, and her capacity would be that of a non-residential senior fellow.

== Return to Goldman Sachs ==
Later in February 2018 it was announced that Powell would return to Goldman Sachs. The position would be on the firm's management committee.

In the following years she was made Goldman's global head of sustainability and inclusive growth. She was also made head of the firm's Sovereign Fund, a role that per the firm involves her being "responsible for helping build and enhance the firm’s relationships with global sovereign clients." She played a key part in Goldman Sachs' role for the massive 2019 initial public offering of Saudi Aramco. The Wall Street Journal wrote that "Dina Powell McCormick has been a critical link between Goldman Sachs and sovereign-wealth funds, particularly those in the Middle East."

Powell departed Goldman Sachs in May 2023 to join BDT & MSD Partners, a merchant bank. She became partner there. Her title was of vice chairman and president of global client services.

In 2023, Powell was elected to ExxonMobil's board of directors.

== Second marriage and role in husband's career ==
Dina and Richard Powell divorced in 2017.

By 2018, Powell was engaged to financier and former government official Dave McCormick. In 2019, she and McCormick were married. At times, Powell subsequently went by the name Dina Powell McCormick.

In 2022, however, Dave McCormick became a top contender for the Republican nomination in the 2022 United States Senate election in Pennsylvania. Powell became strongly involved, accompanying him to Mar-a-Lago in an attempt to secure an endorsement for him from her former boss, the former president. Powell's ties to the former president were considered crucial in potentially counteracting some negative remarks that McCormick had made about Trump in the past. There were reports in the press, denied by some, that Powell hinted that McCormick's rival Dr. Oz would be unelectable due to his Muslim background. Some of those close to Powell expressed dismay that she would make such an argument, given her own background. The couple also emphasized the fact of Oz's dual citizenship. The efforts did not have success, as the endorsement went to Oz.

The Republican primary election was very close and went to a recount phase, but, in the end, McCormick lost to Oz. Oz proceeded to lose the general election to the Democrat, John Fetterman.

On September 21, 2023, McCormick announced his second campaign for the 2024 United States Senate election in Pennsylvania; he did not face strong primary opposition as he had the previous time and won the Republican primary unopposed. Powell was part of his September 2023 campaign announcement. He went on to narrowly defeat three-term incumbent Democratic senator Bob Casey Jr. in what was widely considered an upset.

== Foundation chair ==
In October 2022, Powell was named the new chair of the Robin Hood Foundation, a venture philanthropy that seeks to alleviate poverty in New York. She took the position effective early 2023. She had previously been vice chair of the fund, and helped it coordinate response to the COVID-19 pandemic in the United States.

== Awards and honors ==
Powell was selected as one of the World Economic Forum's Young Global Leaders. The selection happened sometime prior to or in 2010.

She received an Outstanding Young Texas Ex Award, associated with the University of Texas, in 2006.

In 2007, Powell was presented with an American by Choice Award during a special naturalization ceremony performed by Secretary of State Condoleezza Rice; the award recognizes outstanding achievements of naturalized U.S. citizens.

In 2008, she received the inaugural Young Alumna Award from Ursuline Academy of Dallas.

In 2009, Powell was named a Great Immigrant by the Carnegie Corporation of New York for her role in public service and contributions to American life.

In 2017, she was the honored speaker for a State Department dinner in acknowledgment of the Fortune/U.S. State Department Global Women's Mentoring Partnership. At the same time Working Mother named her as one of the 50 Most Powerful Moms of 2017.

Political offices
Preceded by Patricia Harrison	Assistant Secretary of State for Educational and Cultural Affairs; 2005–2007	Succeeded by Goli Ameri
