= Naima Coster =

American novelist

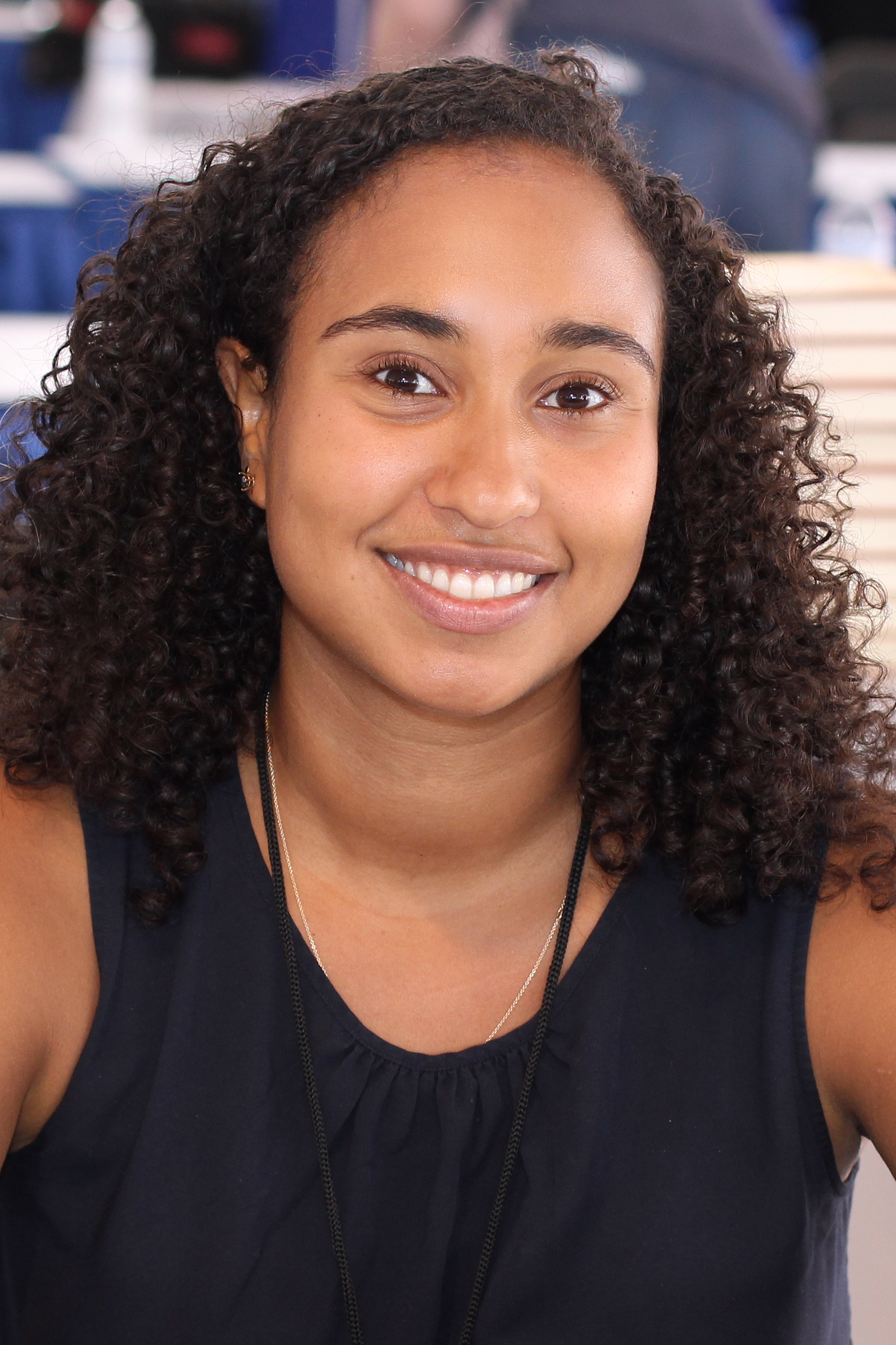
- Coster at the 2018 Texas Book Festival
- Born: New York City, U.S.
- Education: Yale University (BA); Fordham University (MA); Columbia University (MFA)
- Writing career
- Genre: novel

Naima Coster is a Dominican-American writer known for her debut novel, Halsey Street, which was published in January 2018. Coster is the recipient of numerous awards including a Pushcart Prize nomination.

== Life and career ==
Naima Coster was born in Fort Greene, Brooklyn, NY. She identifies as Black and Latina.

Coster holds an MFA in Fiction from Columbia University, an MA in English and Creative Writing from Fordham University, and a BA in English and African American studies from Yale University, where she was a member of Skull and Bones. She is an alumna of Prep for Prep, a leadership development program in New York City. She has taught writing to students in jail, youth programs, and universities.

She is the author of four novels, Halsey Street, Lila, What's Mine and Yours and Take What You Can. Her novels address topics such as gentrification, integration, and racial and cultural identity.

Her writing has appeared in publications including The New York Times, The Rumpus, Arts & Letters, Kweli, and Guernica. She also writes the newsletter, Bloom How You Must. As of 2018, she was a visiting assistant professor at Wake Forest University in North Carolina, where she lives with her family.

== Works ==
=== Novels ===
- Halsey Street. Amazon Publishing, 2017. ISBN 9781503941175. OCLC 1026852371
- What's Mine and Yours. Grand Central Publishing, 2021. ISBN 978-1538702345.

=== Essays ===
- Becoming a Mother While Estranged from Your Own, Elle. April 2021.
- Brooklyn Born, Paris Review Daily. May 2018.
- Who Gets to Write About Gentrification? Lit Hub. January 2018.
- My Editor Was Black. Catapult. December 2017.
- Reorientation. Winner of the Cosmonauts Avenue Non-Fiction Prize, judged by Roxane Gay. September 2017.
- Albums of Our Lives: Nirvana's Nevermind. The Rumpus. June 2015.
- More Than Its Parts. A Practical Wedding. July 2014.
- Fire Escape. Arts & Letters. Spring 2012.
- Fontibón. The Ascentos Review. August 2011.
- Brooklyn Bridge Park. The Fordham Observer. July 2011
- Remembering When Brooklyn Was Mine. The New York Times. February 2011.

=== Stories ===
- Lila - Amazon Original Story
- Cold. Aster (ix) Journal (March 2017) & Kweli (June 2016).
- The Spot. Cosmonauts Avenue. November 2016.
- The Beach. The Fordham Observer. August 2011.
- Stories Told When The Lights Go Out. The Ascentos Review. August 2010.

=== Anthologies ===
- Wild Tongues Can't Be Tamed: 15 Voices from the Latinx Diaspora. Ed. by Saraciea J. Fennell. Flatiron Books, Nov 2021.
- Cosmonauts Avenue Anthology https://cosmonautsavenue.com/shop June 2019.
- This is the Place: Women Writing About Home. Ed. by Margot Case & Kelly McMasters. Seal Press, Nov. 2017.
- Best of Kweli: An Aster(ix) Anthology. Ed. by Angie Cruz & Laura Pegram. Spring 2017.
