= Advantage Testing Foundation =

American non-profit organization

- Founded: 2007
- Founder: Arun Alagappan
- Location: Manhattan, New York, New York
- Website: www.atfoundation.org

The Advantage Testing Foundation is an American not-for-profit educational organization based in New York City. Founded in 2007 by Arun Alagappan, the 501(c) public charity seeks to expand academic and professional opportunities for students of every socioeconomic background by sponsoring innovative educational programs and partnering with leading institutions across the United States.

== Programs ==
In many of the Advantage Testing Foundation's commitments, it has partnered with leading universities to provide talented students of disadvantaged backgrounds the opportunity to excel at the highest academic levels.

=== TRIALS ===
In 2009, the Foundation partnered with Harvard Law School and New York University School of Law to launch TRIALS, the Training and Recruitment Initiative for Admission to Leading Law Schools. The free summer law school preparation program for low-income college students boosts socioeconomic diversity at leading law schools. Students in the program undertake LSAT preparation courses, attend lectures, and meet with prominent lawyers and legal scholars. The program is fully subsidized by the three partner institutions, and was launched with the help of a grant from the Heckscher Foundation. Students enrolled in the program receive a $3,000 stipend. The program has prepared students for admission to the nation's top 10 law schools. As of 2016, approximately 30 percent of students who have attended TRIALS have been admitted to Harvard Law School. TRIALS is widely regarded as one of the nation's most selective full-scholarship pre-law program.

=== Math Prize for Girls ===
The Foundation organizes and sponsors the Advantage Testing Foundation Math Prize for Girls, a single day mathematics competition for middle and high-school girls held annually at MIT that awards cash prizes and encourages young women to seek careers in scientific and mathematical disciplines. The competition provides the world's largest monetary math prize for girls in the world, including a $31,000 prize for first place.

=== Leadership Enterprise for a Diverse America (LEDA) ===
Advantage Testing Foundation is a principal sponsor in partnership with Princeton University of LEDA, a nonprofit organization dedicated to diversifying the nation's leadership pool by helping high-achieving students from low-income backgrounds gain admission to the most selective colleges. Each year, LEDA selects 100 exceptional high school juniors of modest means for the seven-week program. The Foundation provides LEDA Scholars with standardized test preparation. Additionally, scholars receive leadership training, writing instruction, and a year of highly personalized mentoring for the admissions process at the most competitive colleges. In 2017, "61% of the LEDA cohort class were admitted to an Ivy League college, MIT, Yale, or Stanford". More than 65% of LEDA Scholars are the first in their family to attend college.

The Advantage Testing Foundation also provides pro bono intensive SAT and SAT Subject Test instruction to high school juniors in Prep for Prep, a development program that supports student success in high school and college by providing participants with college and career counseling and access to a deep alumni network.

== Board of trustees ==
As of July 2017, the board of trustees are:

- Arun Alagappan, President, President of Advantage Testing
- Martha Minow, Vice President, Dean of Harvard Law School
- John Manning, Vice President, Harvard University's Provost and the Dane Professor of Law
- J. Tomilson Hill, Treasurer, Vice Chairman of Blackstone Group
- John Sexton, Vice President, President Emeritus of New York University
- Shirley Tilghman, President Emeritus of Princeton University
- Lauren Frank, Director of Marketing at Value Insight Partners
- Beth Nash, Founder of the Carr Center for Reproductive Justice
