= Math Prize for Girls =

North American high school competition

The Advantage Testing Foundation Math Prize for Girls, often referred to as The Math Prize for Girls, is an annual mathematics competition open to female high school students from the United States and Canada. The competition offers the world’s largest single monetary math prize in a math contest for young women. In 2017, the First-Place prize was $46,000 (split equally amongst the three-way tie for first) with another $9,000 divided among the remaining finalists. Girls may win a maximum of $100,000 by participating in the competition over multiple years. Organized each year by the Advantage Testing Foundation, the competition is considered to be the preeminent female math competition for young women in North America.

The single-day annual contest is open to female high-school students in 12th grade or below, from the United States and Canada who have attained a qualifying score on the American Mathematics Competitions Exams, specifically the AMC 10 or AMC 12 given in February each year. Up to 300 participants are then selected each year for the competition. Participants must complete 20 short-answer problems in geometry, algebra, trigonometry, and other math topics in 150 minutes. The exams are then reviewed by a panel of judges, who award cash prizes to the top-scoring participants.

== History ==
The competition was founded in 2009 by Arun Alagappan and Dr. Ravi Boppana in an effort to inspire the next generation of female mathematicians and create a community of young women who share a passion for math. Boppana, the competition’s cofounder and Director, said in a statement that "the Math Prize was created to debunk gender stereotypes, and to support young women who see higher-level mathematics as a pursuit that is challenging, fun, and incredibly rewarding.” The first two years of the competition were held at NYU, and since 2011, the competition has been held annually at MIT in Cambridge, Massachusetts.

== Winners ==
The annual first-place winners of The Math Prize for Girls are listed in the table below:

The competition was not held in 2020 or 2021 due to the COVID-19 pandemic.

Year	Overall winner (s)
2025	Selena Ge
2024	Six-way tie: Shruti Arun, Angela Liu, Sophia Hou, Susie Lu, Katie He, and Katherine Liu
2022	Jessica Wan
2019	Jessica Wan
2018	Katie Wu, Yuxuan Zheng
2017	Katie Wu, Megan Joshi, Claire Zhou
2016	Qi Qi, Katie Wu
2015	Rachel Zhang
2014	Celine Liang
2013	Danielle Wang
2012	Victoria Xia
2011	Victoria Xia
2010	Danielle Wang
2009	Elizabeth Synge

Additionally, the Math Prize for Girls awards Youth Prize to the highest scoring student in grade 9 or below.

== Advisory board ==
As of 2017, the competition's Board of Advisors has the following members:

- Ravi Boppana, Director of Mathematics at Advantage Testing, Inc.
- Ioana Dumitriu, Professor of Mathematics at the University of California, San Diego
- Maria Klawe, President of Harvey Mudd College
- Richard Rusczyk, Founder of Art of Problem Solving, Inc. and Director of the USA Mathematical Talent Search
- Michael Sipser, Professor of Applied Mathematics and Dean of Science at MIT
- Gigliola Staffilani, the Abby Rockefeller Mauze Professor of Mathematics at MIT
- Lauren Williams, Professor of Mathematics at Harvard University
- Joseph Woo
- Melanie Wood, Professor of Mathematics at Harvard University
