= Alagappan =

Alagappan is a surname. Notable people with the surname include:

- Alagappa Alagappan (1925–2014), Indian-born American founder of the Hindu Temple Society of North America
- Arun Alagappan, American businessman
- Muthu Alagappan (born c. 1990), British doctor
