= Hangzhou No. 2 High School =

School in Hangzhou, Zhejiang, China

- 杭州第二中学

Location
- Coordinates: 30°10′45″N 120°08′01″E

Information
- Type: coeducational public secondary school
- Motto: Chinese: 立志、努力、为公; Ambition, Endeavor, Compassion
- Established: 1899 as Hangzhou Huilan High School 杭州私立蕙兰中学 1939 as High School Affiliated to National Chekiang University 国立浙江大学附属中学 1951 as Hangzhou No. 2 High School
- Founder: W. S. Sweet and Coching Chu
- President: Cai Xiaoxiong (蔡小雄)
- Enrolment: ≈2,800
- Colours: Parakeet; Golden
- Publication: Hangzhou Erzhong (杭州二中)
- School Song: Chizi Yin (赤子吟)
- Website: www.hz2hs.cn
Hangzhou No. 2 High School
- Simplified Chinese: 杭州第二中学
- Traditional Chinese: 杭州第二中學
Transcriptions
Standard Mandarin
- Hanyu Pinyin: Hángzhōu Dì'èr Zhōngxué

Hangzhou No. 2 High School (Chinese: 杭州第二中学) is a coeducational public secondary school in Hangzhou, Zhejiang, China. It has more than 2,800 students, aged 16 to 18 years. It was founded in 1899 by American Christian missionary W. S. Sweet. The school has gained prestigious reputation in many aspects, often referred to as one of the "three top high schools" in Hangzhou. The school serves as one of three permanent venues of Harvard Summit for Young Leaders in China.

The CEEB Code of the school is 694339.

== Awards and recognition ==
The school was listed as one of the Key Middle Schools of Zhejiang Province in 1978 and was appointed as a First-Class Key Middle School in 1995 by the Zhejiang Education Committee. The school was the first-ever school that was officially recognized as a First-tier Model School of Zhejiang Province.

== Notable alumni ==
- Yu Dafu (1896–1945) class of 1911, writer and poet
- Dong Xiwen (1914-1973) class of 1932, painter
- Feng Zhongyun (冯仲云) (1908-1968) class of 1923, Senior official of China; Order of Bayi recipient. Former President, Harbin Institute of Technology.
- Guan Zihuai (管子怀) (1934-) class of 1951, former Chinese ambassador to Oman, Kuwait, and Bahrain.

== Sister schools ==
- Providence Day School, Charlotte, North Carolina, United States
- Morley Senior High School, Norand, Western Australia, Australia
- Einhard Gymnasium Aachen
