= Alagappa (given name) =

Alagappa is a given name. Notable people with the name include:

- Alagappa Alagappan (1925–2014), Indian-born American founder of the Hindu Temple Society of North America
- Alagappa Chettiar (1909–1957), Indian businessman and philanthropist
