= Arun Alagappan =

American businessman

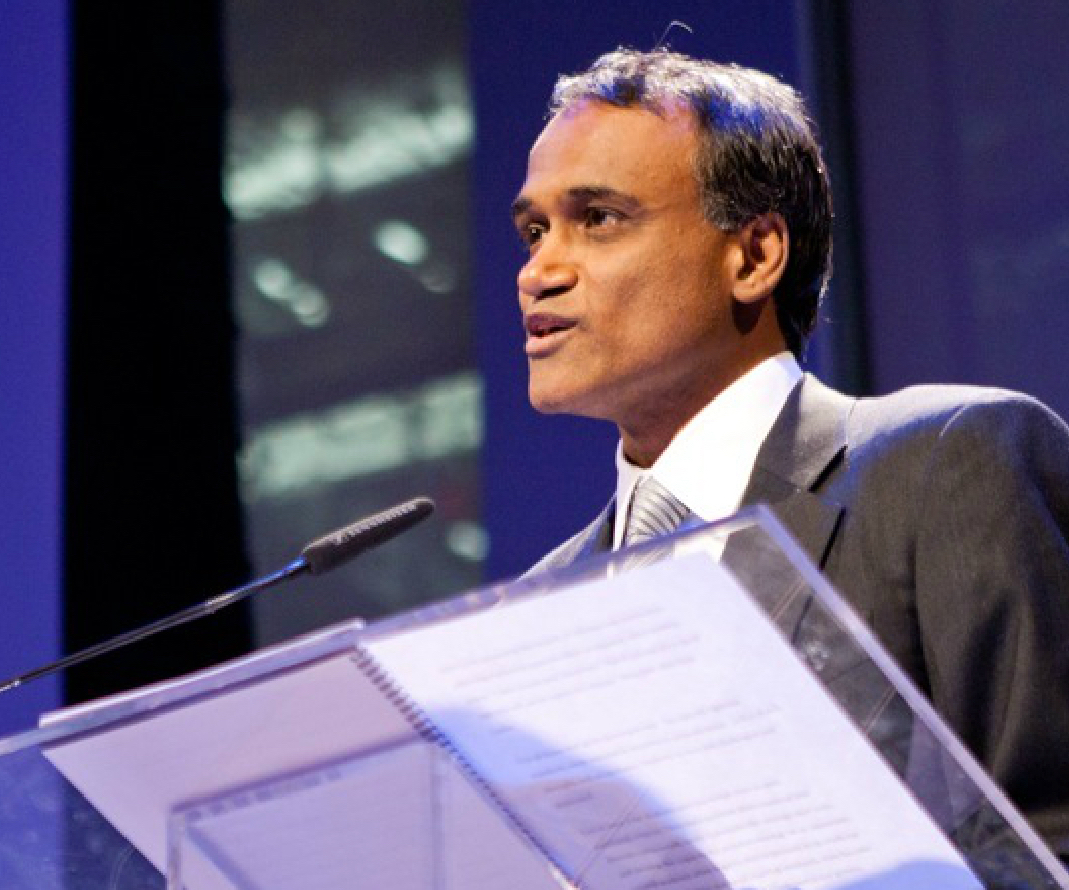
- Education: Princeton University; Harvard Law School
- Occupation: Businessman
- Title: President, Advantage Testing Foundation
- Spouse: Francine Friedman

Arun Alagappan is an American businessman. He is the founder and president of Advantage Testing, Inc., a scholastic test preparation and tutoring agency.

== Early life and education ==
Alagappan was raised in Queens, New York into a Tamil family and attended the United Nations International School. His father, Alagappa Alagappan, worked at the United Nations and was the founder of the Hindu Temple Society of North America, establishing the first traditional Hindu Temple in the US.

Alagappan developed an interest in education during high school, where he began tutoring at the age of 17. He attended Princeton University, where he was elected to the Phi Beta Kappa society and graduated magna cum laude with a degree in philosophy in 1981.

From 1981 to 1982, he tutored privately in New York City then attended Harvard Law School, and spent time working as a teaching fellow in the mathematics department of Harvard College. Alagappan served on the board of editors of the Harvard International Law Journal, and in 1985 graduated with a JD from Harvard Law School.

== Career ==
After graduating law school, Alagappan joined law firm Sullivan & Cromwell and then served as a clerk to Dorothy Wright Nelson on the United States Court of Appeals for the Ninth Circuit. Following his clerkship he founded the tutoring and test preparation company, Advantage Testing, in Manhattan, NY. The company has since grown into one of the nation's largest tutoring agencies, with over 20 offices.

Alagappan makes frequent media appearances to speak about the SAT test. He is a frequent media commentator on trends in standardized testing and has appeared on CNN and as a guest on Bloomberg Television.

== Philanthropic activities ==
Alagappan is the co-founder of the Math Prize for Girls, a one-day mathematics competition that provides the largest monetary math award for young women in the world. In 2009, Alagappan launched a partnership with Harvard Law School and New York University School of Law, named TRIALS: the Training and Recruitment Initiative for Admission to Leading Law Schools. The summer residential scholarship program for motivated lower income college students is aimed at boosting socioeconomic diversity at the nation's top law schools. Students in the program receive focused LSAT instruction from Advantage Testing instructors and attend lectures by prominent lawyers, public figures and legal scholars.

Alagappan is the vice president of the board of directors of Leadership Enterprise for a Diverse America (LEDA), a nonprofit organization dedicated to helping high achieving students from low income and diverse backgrounds gain admission to the nation’s most selective colleges. LEDA Scholars are offered ongoing advising, career counseling, postgraduate planning and community-building support to help them succeed. In 2011, The Wall Street Journal profiled Alagappan in its "Donor of the Day" column in recognition for his support of LEDA. Alagappan also serves on the Board of Trustees for Prep for Prep. Alagappan offers his company's services pro bono to approximately 15% of his company's students.

== Awards and honors ==
- In 1984, the Dean of Harvard College awarded him with a Certificate of Distinction for Outstanding Teaching of Harvard Undergraduates.
- In 2006, he was one of seven educators named by New York Magazine as "The Most Influential People in Education".
- In 2009, he was named an honorary Pi Eta Kappa fellow by Medgar Evers College for "advancing the lives of young men of color.
- In 2011, the Wall Street Journal named Alagappan "Donor of the Day" for his philanthropic work with the LEDA organization, for "helping to find the next generation of leaders who will bring diversity, new ideas, compassion, and a different kind of leadership to institutions."
