= Aya Hijazi =

Egyptian-American social activist

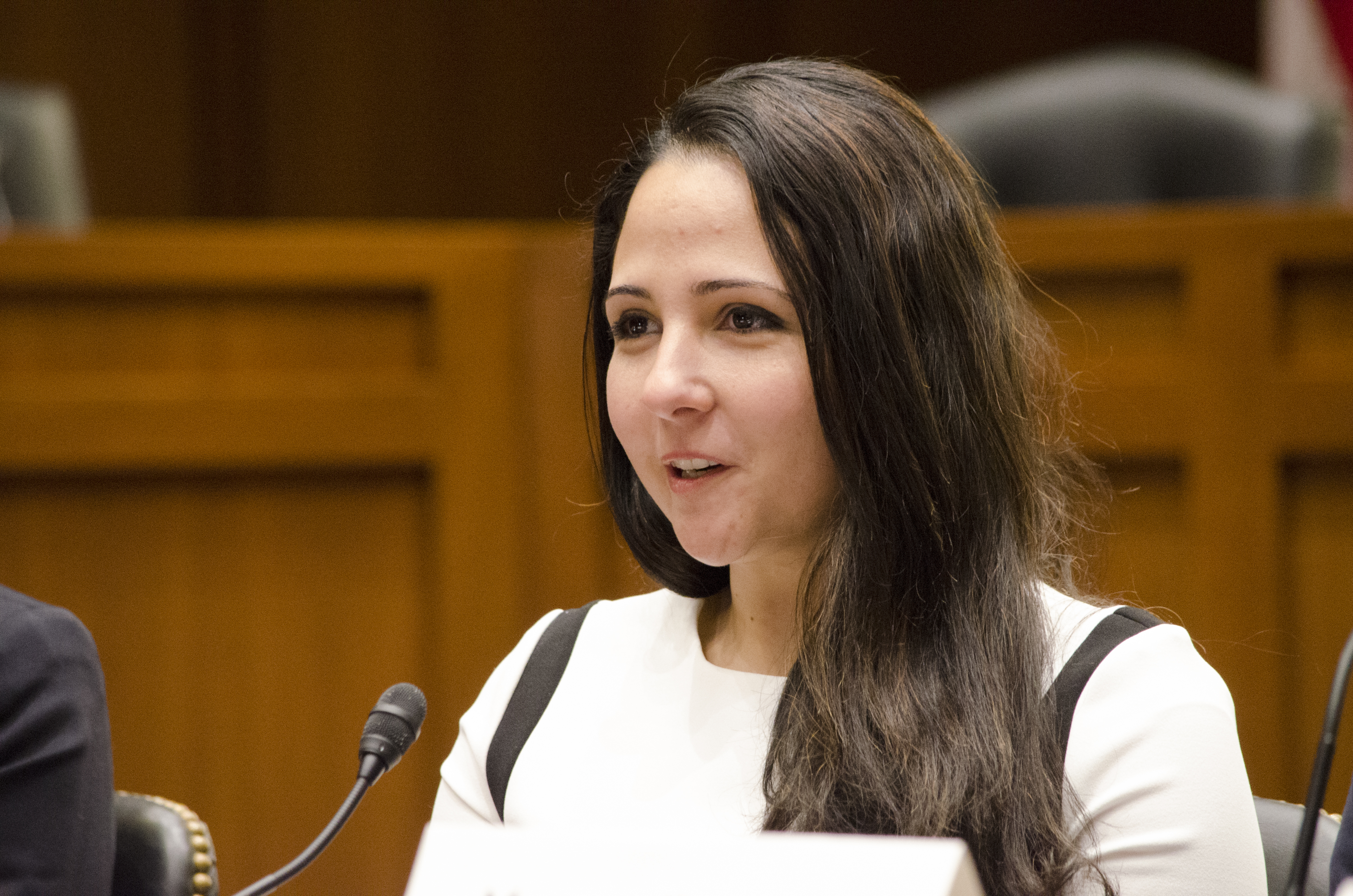
- Belady foundation Aya Hijazi talks about her experience as a political prisoner, 2018
- Born: Aya Hijazi; 23 January 1987 (age 39)
- Education: Masters in Public Administration Candidate, Harvard University BA in Conflict Resolution
- Alma mater: George Mason University; Harvard University
- Known for: Belady Foundation for Street Children; Imprisonment in Egypt 2014–2017
- Spouse: Mohamed Hassanien
- Website: http://belady-ih.org/

Aya Hijazi (also spelled: Hegazy or Higazi, Arabic: آية حجازي, born 23 January 1987) is an Egyptian-American charity worker and social activist. Together with her husband she founded an NGO "Belady Foundation" to support child political prisoners in Egypt. Hijazi, her husband and five other Belady members were imprisoned in Cairo from 2014 until 2017, when the Cairo Criminal Court found them innocent.

== Childhood and education ==
Hijazi became interested in social activism during her childhood in the United States (US). She studied conflict analysis and conflict resolution at George Mason University in the US and law at Cairo University in Egypt.

== 2011 Egyptian revolution and Belady ==
During the 2011 Egyptian revolution, Hijazi returned to her homeland, Egypt, along with her husband, Mohamed Hassanein, to establish a non-governmental organization (NGO), "Belady" (meaning "My Home"). Hijazi and Hassanein's intention was that Belady was to become "a symbolic island that unified people from all walks of life, allowing them to work towards the betterment of society". Belady focused on children and youth – one of Belady's main projects was helping street children who would otherwise be unsupported by state or non-state social support institutions. Working on such projects was seen by Belady to foster a sense of community while developing life skills within the children and the volunteers.

=== Arrest and imprisonment ===
On 1 May 2014, police forces raided Belady and arrested Aya, her husband, Mohamed, Sherif Talaat and Amira Farag, also Belady members. They were charged with child abuse. Three months later, the police arrested Ibrahim Abd Rabbo, Karim Magdy and Mohamed al-Sayed, who had been trying to film video testimony with several children who had earlier been interviewed by the prosecution. For nearly three years, the seven individuals were imprisoned under charges that included human trafficking, kidnapping, and rape.

NGOs and public figures from Egypt and around the world pressed for the release of Aya, her husband, and the Belady members. The case took a turning point when Aya's college friend, Chelsea Cowan, successfully lobbied congressmen and senators, bringing attention to her case. As a result, Hillary Clinton made it a highlight in her presidential election campaign and President Trump pressed for the release of Aya and the other defendants.

On 16 April 2017, the Cairo Criminal Court found Aya and all Belady members innocent of all charges. Two days after their release, Dina Powell (U.S. Deputy National Security Advisor for Strategy to President Donald Trump) flew with Aya and her husband in a private plane to the United States; President Trump, along with his daughter, Ivanka, and her husband, Jared Kushner, welcomed her to the White House and celebrated her release. According to Hijazi, during a meeting following her release, Trump told her "You know it's I who released you, don't you? I succeeded and Obama failed." She later described feeling pressured during the encounter and criticized what she characterized as an emphasis on personal credit, and during the 2020 presidential election she publicly endorsed Joe Biden.

Aya's case took place in the context of Egypt's crackdown on civil society, police corruption, the fabrication of criminal cases, and the abuse of pretrial detention and its use as a political tool to suppress any opposition.

=== Post release ===
As of 2017, Aya resides in Washington D.C., where she works on expanding Belady and "saving the dreams of the most vulnerable children", by working towards the release of child political prisoners in Egypt. She plans to establish "islands of humanity" throughout the Middle East and other conflict zones. Hijazi initially supported Bernie Sanders for president in the 2020 election. In early November 2020, Hijazi tweeted her support for Joe Biden.

== Personal life ==
Hijazi was born to a Lebanese-Born father of Egyptian descent and Egyptian Mother. She married another Egyptian–American social activist, Mohamed Hassanien.
