= White House Presidential Personnel Office =

Main human resources division of the US chief executive's workplace

White House Office of Presidential Personnel
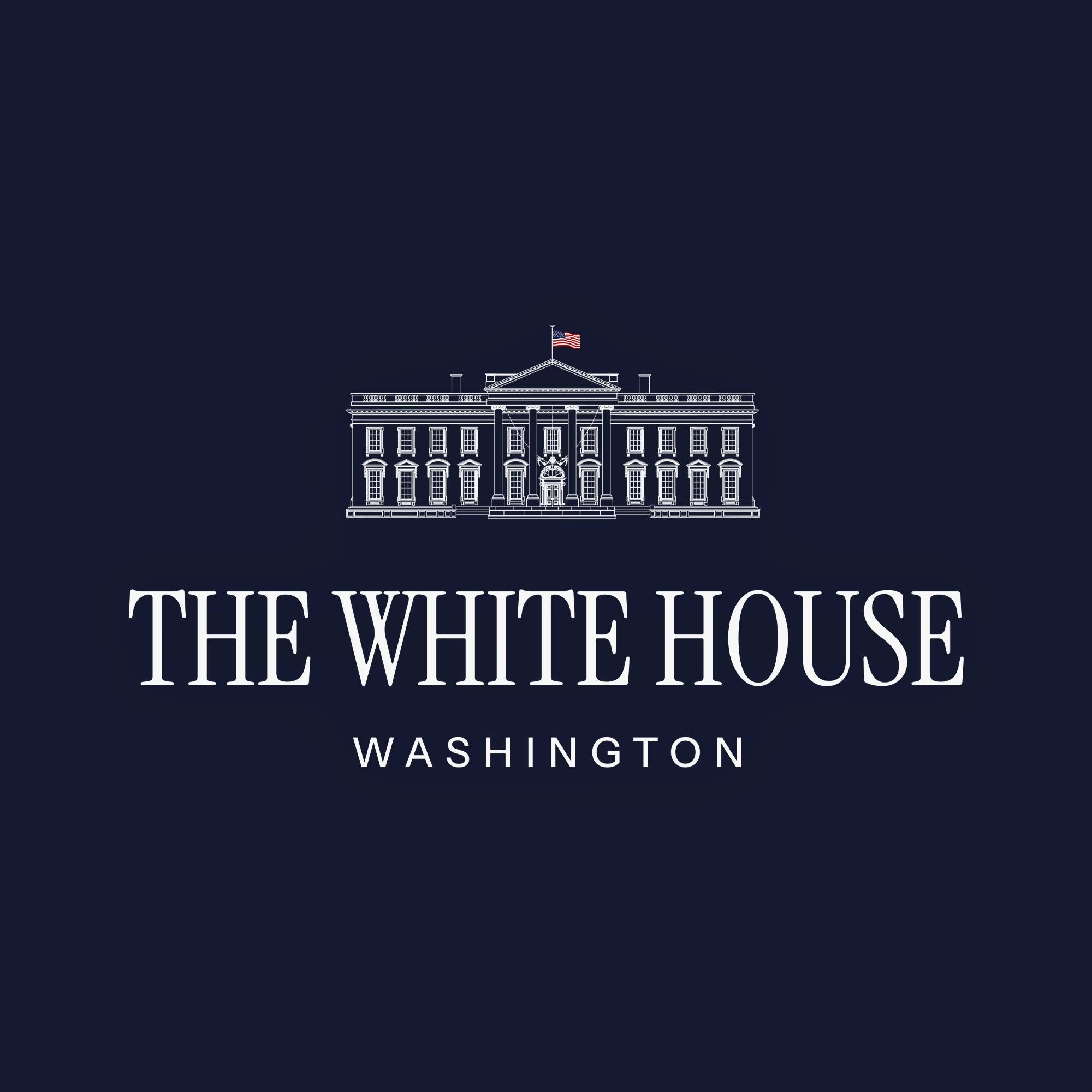

Agency overview
- Headquarters: Eisenhower Executive Office Building Washington, D.C., U.S.; 38°53′51.24″N 77°2′20.93″W
- Agency executives: Dan Scavino, Director; Morgan DeWitt-Snow, Deputy Director
- Parent department: White House Office

The White House Presidential Personnel Office (PPO), sometimes written as Office of Presidential Personnel, is the part of the White House Office tasked with vetting new appointees. Its offices are on the first floor of the Eisenhower Executive Office Building in Washington, D.C. The PPO is one of the offices most responsible for assessing candidates to work at or for the White House.

The office is responsible for approximately 4,000 political appointment positions, of which 1,600 require Senate confirmation. The White House Presidential Office recruits candidates to serve in departments and agencies throughout the Executive Branch. It presents candidates for presidential appointments with Senate confirmation (PAS) to the Senate after they have been approved by the president of the United States. The mission of the office is to provide the president with the best applicants possible for presidency-appointed positions. Lastly, it also provides policy guidance for federal department and agency heads on conduct for political activities.

== Responsibilities ==
The responsibilities of the Presidential Personnel Office include:

- handling and processing recommendations from political figures.
- keeping a talent bank of qualified, cleared candidates on hand.
- search for job candidates:
  - executive search.
  - screening interviews.
  - candidate evaluation.
  - security clearance.
  - conflict of interest clearance.
  - forwarding recommendations to the president.

== History ==
The White House Personnel Office (WHPO) was created by Frederick V. Malek in 1971 to standardize the White House's hiring process. In 1974, President Gerald Ford renamed the WHPO to the Presidential Personnel Office (PPO) and restructured it to focus more on presidential appointments, relying more on department heads to secure non-presidential appointments in their departments.

On January 4, 2017, President Donald Trump named Johnny DeStefano Director of PPO in the incoming Trump administration. On January 30, 2017, DeStefano wrote a letter to Acting Attorney General Sally Yates informing her of her dismissal. DeStefano left the position on May 24, 2019.

In 2018, the PPO was made up of about 30 members, about one-third of its usual staff. The professionalism of the PPO under President Trump was challenged, with The Washington Post reporting that the office was staffed with largely-inexperienced personnel. As of July 2021, the PPO under President Biden returned to its usual staffing numbers, with about 80 people in the office.

In January 2020, Trump appointed John McEntee Director of PPO, reporting directly to Trump, who tasked him with identifying and removing political appointees and career officials deemed insufficiently loyal to the Trump administration. On October 21, 2020, two weeks before the 2020 elections, President Trump signed an executive order creating a new Schedule F category within the excepted service for employees “in confidential, policy-determining, policy-making and policy-advocating positions”. He also instructed agencies to identify and transfer competitive service employees that meet that description into the new job classification, an initiative that could strip hundreds of thousands of federal workers of their civil service protections and effectively make them at-will employees. Reviews by agencies are due at the PPO by January 19, 2021, a day before the end of the Trump presidency.

== Leadership ==
Name	Start	End	President
Fred Malek	September 1970	January 1973	Richard Nixon (1969–1974)
Jerry Jones	January 1973	April 1974	Richard Nixon (1969–1974)
David Wimer	April 1974	September 1974	Richard Nixon (1969–1974)
David Wimer	April 1974	September 1974	Gerald Ford (1974–1977)
William Walker	October 1974	June 1975	Gerald Ford (1974–1977)
Douglas Bennett	June 1975	January 20, 1977	Gerald Ford (1974–1977)
James Gammill	January 20, 1977	October 17, 1978	Jimmy Carter (1977–1981)
Arnold Miller	October 17, 1978	January 20, 1981	Jimmy Carter (1977–1981)
Pendleton James	January 20, 1981	1982	Ronald Reagan (1981–1989)
John Herrington	February 1983	February 7, 1985	Ronald Reagan (1981–1989)
Robert Tuttle	February 7, 1985	January 20, 1989	Ronald Reagan (1981–1989)
Chase Untermeyer	January 20, 1989	August 24, 1991	George H. W. Bush (1989–1993)
Constance Horner	1991	January 20, 1993	George H. W. Bush (1989–1993)
Bruce Lindsey	January 20, 1993	April 1995	Bill Clinton (1993–2001)
Bob Nash	1995	January 20, 2001	Bill Clinton (1993–2001)
Clay Johnson	January 20, 2001	January 2003	George W. Bush (2001–2009)
Dina Powell	January 2003	July 2005	George W. Bush (2001–2009)
Liza Wright	July 18, 2005	September 2007	George W. Bush (2001–2009)
Joie Gregor	2007	2008	George W. Bush (2001–2009)
Don Gips	January 20, 2009	July 2009	Barack Obama (2009–2017)
Nancy Hogan	July 2009	July 2013	Barack Obama (2009–2017)
Jonathan McBride	July 2013	February 2015	Barack Obama (2009–2017)
Valerie Green	February 2015	March 2016	Barack Obama (2009–2017)
Johnny DeStefano	January 20, 2017	February 9, 2018	Donald Trump (2017–2021)
Sean Doocey	February 9, 2018	January 8, 2020	Donald Trump (2017–2021)
John McEntee	January 8, 2020	January 20, 2021	Donald Trump (2017–2021)
Cathy Russell	January 20, 2021	January 31, 2022	Joe Biden (2021–2025)
Gautam Raghavan	January 31, 2022	January 20, 2025	Joe Biden (2021–2025)
Sergio Gor	January 20, 2025	October 13, 2025	Donald Trump (2025–present)
Dan Scavino	October 13, 2025	present	Donald Trump (2025–present)
