= John Vogelstein =

American businessman

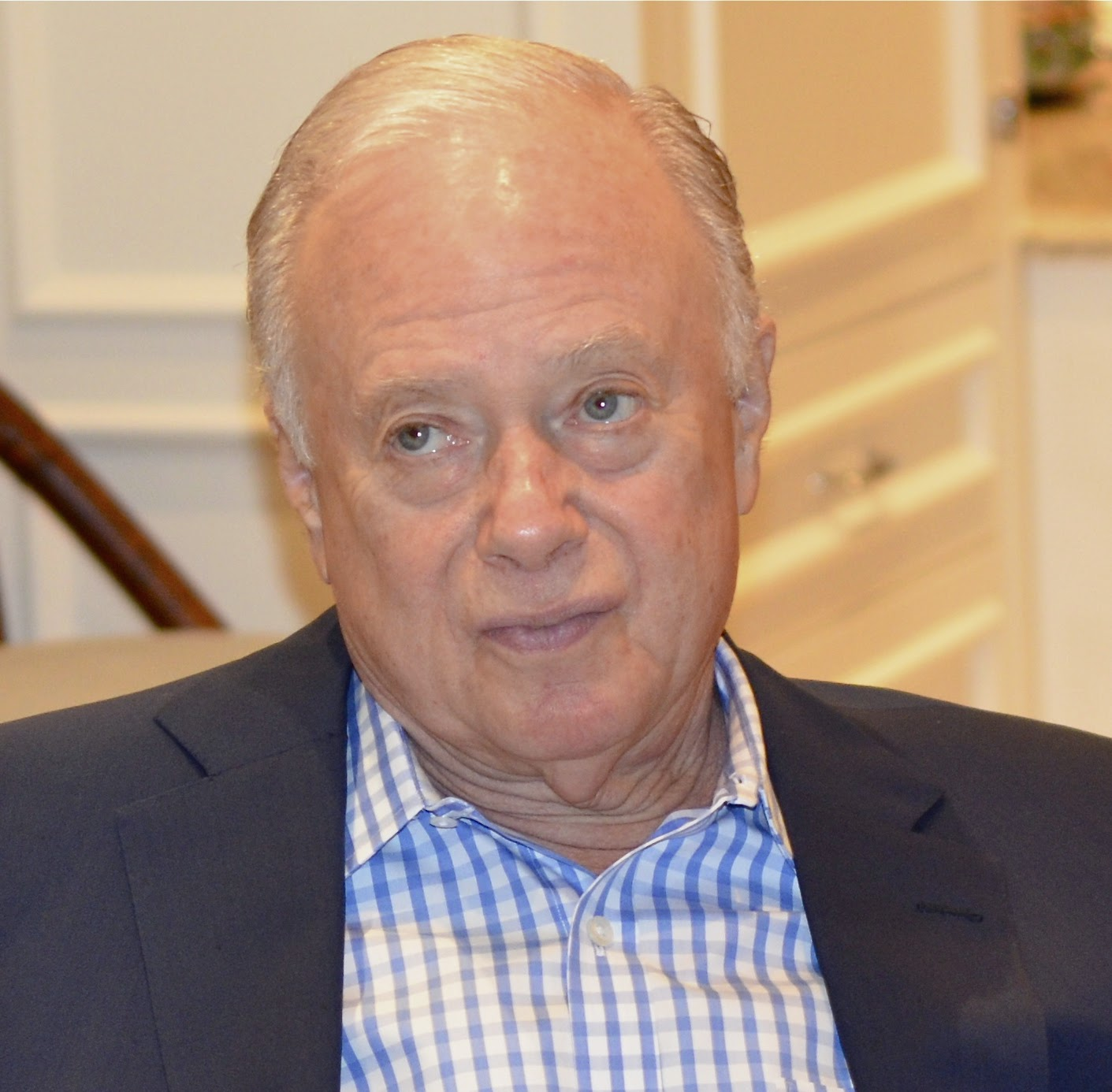
- Born: December 9, 1934 (age 91); New York City, US
- Occupations: Original president and vice-chairman of Warburg Pincus

John L. Vogelstein (born December 9, 1934) is an American business executive and financier. With Lionel Pincus, he co-founded the specialized financial services firm that became Warburg Pincus, and was its president and vice chairman from the late 1960s to 2002.

== Early life and education ==
Vogelstein was born in 1934 in New York City, His parents were Ruth and Hans Vogelstein. He was a student at the Taft School in Watertown, Connecticut.

He attended Harvard College for two years before leaving at age 19 to begin his career in finance at Lazard.

== Career ==
=== Lazard ===
Vogelstein began his career in 1954 at Lazard Fréres & Co. He was at Lazard for 13 years, rising to become its head of research and then partner in early 1964 when he was 29.

=== Warburg Pincus ===
Following a disagreement with Lazard senior partner Andre Meyer in 1967, that year he joined Lionel Pincus in founding the specialized financial services firm that in 1971 became Warburg Pincus. Vogelstein and Pincus developed the strategy of very large, long-term and diversified investments.

At Warburg Pincus, Vogelstein helped establish the "venture capital megafund" in the 1960s. Pincus was the firm's founder and chairman while Vogelstein was vice chairman and then president.

As executive vice president, Vogelstein led the company's negotiations in deals that included Twentieth Century Fox, Humana and Mattel. He was a member of the board of Twentieth Century Fox in the late 1970s, and was elected to the board of production company Filmways after it was acquired by Orion Pictures in 1982.

During his time at Warburg Pincus, the company became the financial industry's first $100 million fund in 1981, and the first $1 billion fund in 1986. He and Pincus went on to raise billions of dollars to invest in companies across diversified industries.

Vogelstein is credited for engineering Warburg Pincus's 1984 financial rescue of toy company Mattel in which $231 million was invested. As the largest shareholder in Mattel, Warburg Pincus managed the toy maker's recovery and quadrupled its 45% investment in seven years. Vogelstein and Pincus also negotiated the $1 billion rescue plan of Mellon Bank in 1988, using the “good bank-bad bank” structure wherein Mellon created a new bank to house troubled loans.

Vogelstein was Warburg Pincus's president and vice chairman until 2002, when both he and Pincus stepped down. He was thereafter a senior adviser for the company and remained a special limited partner.

=== New Providence Asset Management ===
In 2003, Vogelstein formed the independent financial-management firm New Providence Asset Management, and was its chairman and general partner. New Providence Asset Management was acquired by The Colony Group, a Boston-based investment advisory firm, in 2021.

== Personal life ==
Vogelstein married Barbara Louise Manfrey in 2000. His previous marriages ended in divorce. He has two sons.

Vogelstein has served as the chairman of the Taft School, Third Way, and chairman emeritus of the New York City Ballet and Prep for Prep.
