= Clay Johnson III =

American civil servant

Clay Johnson
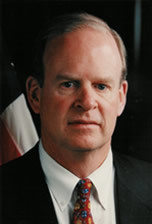

Director of the Office of Presidential Personnel
- In office 2001–2003
- President: George W. Bush
- Preceded by: Bob Nash
- Succeeded by: Dina Powell

Personal details
- Born: 1946 or 1947 (age 79–80) Fort Worth, Texas, U.S.
- Party: Republican
- Children: 2
- Education: Yale University (BA); Massachusetts Institute of Technology (MBA)

Clay Johnson III (born 1946/1947) is an American civil servant who served as the deputy director for management at the Office of Management and Budget from 2003 to the end of the George W. Bush Administration in 2009.

== Early life and education ==
Johnson was born and raised in Fort Worth, Texas, and attended boarding school in Andover, Massachusetts. Johnson first met George W. Bush when they were students at Phillips Academy. The two were roommates and Delta Kappa Epsilon fraternity brothers at Yale University, Johnson received his Bachelor of Arts at Yale before earning a Master of Business Administration from the MIT Sloan School of Management in 1970.

== Career ==
Johnson was previously president of Horchow Mail Order and Neiman Marcus Mail Order. He served as the deputy director and chief operating officer of the Dallas Museum of Art and held positions at Frito-Lay and Wilson Sporting Goods.

He served U.S. President George W. Bush since his tenure as Governor of Texas. From 1995 to 2000, Johnson worked with then-governor George W. Bush in Austin, first as his appointments director, then as his chief of staff, and later as the executive director of the Bush-Cheney presidential transition.

Prior to becoming OMB deputy director, he was an assistant to the president and director of presidential personnel, serving from 2001 to 2003. During his time leading the Office of Presidential Personnel, Johnson worked with including Dina Powell, Jodey Arrington, and Stuart Holliday. In 2015, Johnson was elected as a fellow of the National Academy of Public Administration.

== Personal life ==
Clay is married to Anne Johnson and has two twin sons, Robert and Weldon.

His sons own Letsrun.com.
