= Prep for Prep =

Leadership development program for students of color

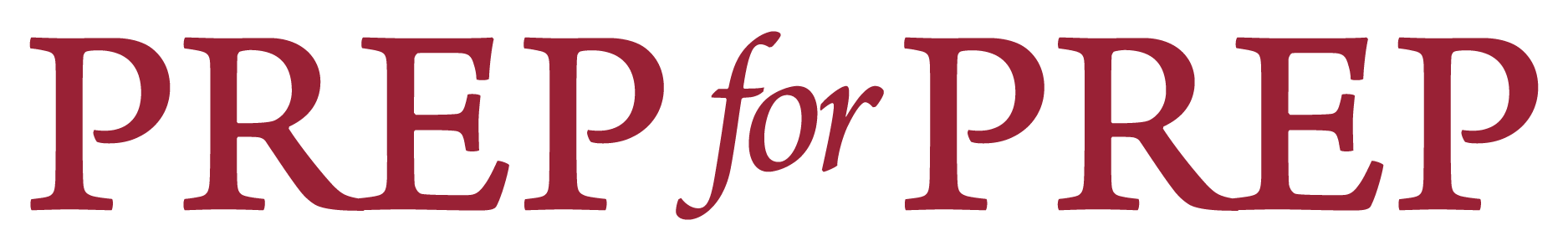

Information
- Type: Leadership development; Gifted education
- Established: 1978
- Founder: Gary Simons
- Leadership: Diahann Billings (CEO); Sharon Madison (COO); Lauren Givner (CAO); Jackson Collins (Executive Director)
- Slogan: Success is Better Shared
- Alumni: 4,500+
- Board Chairs: Lisa Smith Cashin, Trustee; Margaret Morse, AC; Jake Chasan, AC
- Chairs Emeritus: Martin Lipton; John Vogelstein; Scott L. Bok
- Benefactors: Goldman Sachs Foundation
- Financial Aid: $40mm (annual grant)
- Website: https://prepforprep.org

Prep for Prep is a leadership development and gifted education program dedicated to expanding educational access. The organization's programs target high-achieving New York City students and help with scholarship placement into many of the country's most respected secondary schools and colleges.

The New York Times has called Prep for Prep the "ticket to the top [through] admission to one of the nation's premier colleges."

== History ==
Prep for Prep was founded in 1978 by Gary Simons, a public-school teacher in the Bronx, starting with 25 students from diverse and low-income backgrounds and three teachers known as "Contingent I". During Prep for Prep's first year, eleven independent schools committed places for its students and 22 students matriculated from those schools. Within a year of inception, the acceptance rate had fallen to 12%.

In 1988, Prep for Prep expanded its mission to independent boarding schools, launching a program known as "PREP 9" under Peter Bordonaro's leadership. PREP 9 helps the brightest and hardest-working students in New York City and the metropolitan areas of Westchester, Long Island, New Jersey, and Connecticut prepare for leading independent boarding schools across the Northeast and mid-Atlantic. The selection process begins in 7th grade, when students apply to PREP 9 for entry into boarding schools in 9th grade. Space in the PREP 9 program is reserved for students who demonstrate very strong academic performance and high financial need. PREP 9 considers family income and financial assets as part of its application process.

In 1989, Contingent I students completed undergraduate studies, graduating from Columbia, Cornell, Harvard, Northwestern, Oberlin, The University of Pennsylvania, and Princeton.

In 2000, the Goldman Sachs Foundation granted Prep for Prep over $1 million to expand and prepare significantly more students for selective colleges.

In 2002, Simons was succeeded by Aileen Heffernan.

By 2011, over 1,000 Prep for Prep students had graduated from college, and by 2018, the number had increased to more than 3,000.

In 2020, the Board of Trustees selected Ruth Jurgensen to succeed Heffernan. In 2023, in partnership with advertising firm TBWA/Chiat/Day, Prep for Prep introduced a new slogan: "Success is Better Shared." In 2025, Diahann Billings became the first alumna of the program to serve in the role of CEO.

Today, the Prep for Prep community includes more than 5,600 students and alumni. Each year, Prep for Prep hosts a charity gala called the Lilac Ball, which is regularly attended by famous patrons.

== Student selection ==
Each year, a citywide "talent search" selects about 125 students—95 fifth-graders and 30 sixth-graders. To qualify for recruitment, 5th-graders must have a scaled score of 330 or above on the English Language Arts (ELA) test administered during their 4th-grade year or have scored in the 90th percentile on any standardized reading test administered in that year. 6th-graders must have a scaled score of 335 (90th percentile) or above on the ELA exam administered during their 5th-grade year. Applicants then undergo a series of interviews and further standardized testing to gain admission. Fifth- and sixth-graders are admitted into Prep for Prep and earn spots at leading day schools in New York City.

== Program ==
Admitted students undergo a rigorous 14-month academic course known as the "Preparatory Component" before their sixth- or seventh-grade year, which includes two intensive seven-week summer sessions and after-school Wednesday and all-day Saturday classes during the intervening school year. Courses include History, Algebra, Pre-Algebra, Research, Latin, French, Spanish, Mandarin, Literature, Writing Conference, and Science, which includes biology, physics, and chemistry, Invictus, a sociology and psychology-based course, PIMAS (Problems and Issues in Modern American Society), term paper research, and Computer Science. On average, 60% of students complete this program and are placed in schools among three dozen leading New York City independent schools. These schools commit places for Prep for Prep students and almost $12 million annually in scholarships. Throughout the program and after high school graduation, students receive personal and academic counseling, college counseling, and career counseling, and participate in leadership and community development activities, parties, and trips for alumni.

The program also helps students after college with placement into positions at prestigious firms such as Goldman Sachs, Google, and J.P. Morgan Chase through corporate partnerships designed to expand diverse talent pools on Wall Street, in engineering, and across business.

== Notable alumni ==
Many notable people have associated with Prep for Prep since its inception, including judges, attorneys general, actors, educators, entrepreneurs, and bankers.

=== Notable students ===
The following people were students of the Prep for Prep or PREP 9 programs:

- Kimberley S. Knowles — Associate Judge on the Superior Court of the District of Columbia
- Kristen Clarke — former Assistant Attorney General for the Civil Rights Division at the United States Department of Justice
- Darrin Henson — choreographer, dancer, actor, director and producer
- Rob Brown — actor
- Angela Yee — radio personality
- Jabari Brisport — New York State Senator, activist and former public school teacher
- Amina Gautier — writer
- Naima Coster — novelist
- Taha Abdul-Basser — Chaplin at Harvard University
- Evette Rios — television host

=== Notable faculty & staff ===
The following person served on the faculty or as a staff member at Prep for Prep:

- Eva Moskowitz — CEO of Success Academy Charter Schools, former civics teacher at Prep for Prep

=== Notable board members ===
The following people have served on the Prep for Prep board as trustees or associate council members:

- Arun Alagappan — Founder and President of Advantage Testing Foundation
- Jake Chasan – television personality known for Wahl Street
- James Cole Jr. — Deputy Secretary of Education under President Barack Obama
- Martin Lipton — lawyer, founding partner of law firm of Wachtell, Lipton, Rosen & Katz
- Daniel S. Loeb — hedge fund manager, Founder and CEO of Third Point Management
- Harold McGraw III — CEO and Chairman of McGraw Hill Companies (now S&P Global)
- John Vogelstein — venture capitalist at Warburg Pincus

== See also ==
- Gifted education
- Sponsors for Educational Opportunity (SEO)
- Goldman Sachs Foundation — one of the major benefactors of Prep for Prep
