= Greater Philadelphia Hispanic Chamber of Commerce =

Nonprofit organization in Pennsylvania, US

The Greater Philadelphia Hispanic Chamber of Commerce (GPHCC) is a 501(c)(3) not-for-profit organization in the Philadelphia region focused on Hispanic businesses and professionals.

== History ==
In 2006–2007, the GPHCC won the Small-Sized Chamber of the Year In 2011–2012, the Greater Philadelphia Hispanic Chamber of Commerce won the Medium-Sized Chamber of Commerce of the Year.

In 2013, the GPHCC was named as a partner with the Goldman Sachs 10,000 Small Businesses initiative to recruit small businesses to attend the program held at the Community College of Philadelphia.
