= Liza Wright =

American politician

Director of the White House Presidential Personnel Office
- In office July 18, 2005 – September 2007
- President: George W. Bush
- Preceded by: Dina Powell
- Succeeded by: Joie Gregor

Personal details
- Party: Republican
- Education: James Madison University (BA)

Liza Wright served George W. Bush as Assistant to President for Presidential Personnel and Director of Presidential Personnel. She was responsible for leading the team that recruits thousands of candidates for all senior-level positions within the Bush Administration.

Liza Wright previously served in the Bush administration as a Special Assistant to the President for Presidential Personnel. Prior to joining the administration, Wright was a principal at Heidrick & Struggles, an executive search company.

She was previously an executive recruiter at Capital One Financial Corporation. Wright received her bachelor's degree from James Madison University.
