= Harvard Summit for Young Leaders in China =

The Harvard Summit for Young Leaders in China (HSYLC) is an annual conference for Chinese high school students organized by the Harvard Association for US-China Relations (HAUSCR). The eight-day conference, conducted by Harvard College undergraduates, faculty, and prominent leaders from both nations, seeks to expose 600 Chinese high school students to liberal arts education. The conference includes seminars led by Harvard College undergraduate students. In prior years, the conference included a Distinguished Speaker Series and an entrepreneurial program organized in connection with China Thinks Big.

Currently, the conferences take place in Beijing, Shanghai, Hangzhou, and Shenzhen. Each site hosts about 40 Harvard College students that teach seminars and 40 teaching fellows (TFs). TFs are typically Chinese natives also in undergraduate programs with strong English and leadership skills.

== History ==
HSYLC's parent organization, HAUSCR, was founded in the fall of 2005 by seven Harvard College freshmen. HSYLC became the organization's flagship program, and the first conference was held in the summer of 2006. HSYLC 2006, supported by the Goldman Sachs Foundation and American Airlines, recruited 37 Harvard students to create and teach a curriculum at a school in Shanghai. The program received extensive media attention across China, bringing approximately 600 high school students from among thousands of applicants to participate. By 2008, the Chinese high school students at HSYLC represented 120 high schools from across China. By HSYLC 2016, the program consisted of separate sites in three cities, Beijing, Shanghai, and Hangzhou. HSYLC Hangzhou 2016 was organized in partnership with the 2016 G20 Hangzhou summit. In 2024, HAUSCR launched HSYLC Shenzhen.

== Student seminars ==
HSYLC teaches Chinese high school students. Structured after Harvard College's own Freshman Seminar Program, seminars at HSYLC are designed and led by Harvard undergraduates knowledgeable in a particular area of interest.

Through an application process, 90 to 100 Seminar Leaders (SLs) are selected to lead week-long seminars in either Beijing, Shanghai, Shenzhen, or Hangzhou, and are aided by a Teaching Assistant, a Chinese college student who undergoes an application process. Each high school participant can explore a total of three seminar topics. Seminars range from traditional academic topics, like Uncovering Dark Corners of Human Psyche: Abnormal Psychology, The Game Theory of International Relations, Your Brain on Computers, and V.2.0: Present and Future Possibilities in Electronically Enhancing the Human Mind, to less conventional ones, including The Social Psychology of Love, Sleep Science, and Attraction and A History of Chocolate. Seminar leaders and students explore topics using historical, economic, literary, anthropological and ethnographic lenses of discipline. The seminars introduce students to a new style of learning that incorporates active and collaborative research, critical analysis of sources and ideas, and Socratic discussions among peers.

== Speaker events ==
Throughout the conference at least one speaker event is offered each day. Lectures emphasize audience interaction. HSYLC has hosted Jack Ma Yun, founder of Alibaba.com and CEO of Yahoo! China as well as Mr. John L. Thornton, former president of Goldman Sachs. Other past speakers include: Kai-Fu Lee, founding president of Google China; Lawrence Summers, former President of Harvard University; Yuanli Liu, Assistant Professor and Founding Director of the China Initiative from Harvard School of Public Health; Johnny Depp, famous actor; Yao Ming; and Nancy Barry, former president of Women's World Banking.

== HSYLC Activities ==
SLs and TFs work together to create learning opportunities for their students, but also cultivate a fun environment through structured activities. Students compete in "House Olympics," where teams of students participate in unique sports challenges

== Press coverage ==
- New York Times: https://www.nytimes.com/2007/04/01/magazine/01China.t.html?pagewanted=1&n=Top/Reference/Times%20Topics/Organizations/I/Ivy%20League&_r=1 2007, April 1
- Ron Tian News http://rt.xaonline.gov.cn/xw/show.asp?id=658 2007, March 14
- Sohu News http://sh.sohu.com/20070806/n251434963.shtml 2007, Aug. 6
- 致意HSYLC(哈佛大学中美中学生领袖峰会) https://web.archive.org/web/20110708144338/http://zx.china-b.com/hfdx/zixun_77124.html
- 中美学生领袖峰会今年将继续举行 http://www.shjubao.cn/eastday/edu/jyxw/u1a2739703.html
- 中美优秀学生领袖沪上聚首交流互动 http://old.jfdaily.com/gb/jfxww/xlbk/xwcb/node27909/node27910/userobject1ai1749238.html
- 学生粉丝用思想"叫板"易中天 http://edu.people.com.cn/GB/6079350.html
- 中美学生领袖峰会端出明日行动计划 http://edu.chinanews.cn/edu/xyztc/news/2007/08-13/1000644.shtml
- 中美学生领袖峰会易中天首讲 学生领袖要读诸子 http://edu.chinanews.cn/edu/xyztc/news/2007/08-07/996567.shtml
- 哈佛学生峰会 “明日行动计划” 进入决赛 https://web.archive.org/web/20080113042253/http://web.xwwb.com/wbnews.php?db=2
- 未来精英们：大声说出你们的梦想 https://web.archive.org/web/20081205055909/http://www.china-cbn.com/s/n/000005/20070830/000000077351.shtml
- 中美学生领袖峰会第一课学习"失败" 哈佛教授 http://edu.qq.com/a/20060808/000317.htm
- 李开复马云激情对碰话成功 http://news.chinamedia.com.cn/news/news_view_1929.htm Morning News (新闻晨报) “200 Harvard student leaders at the US-China Summit proposed a brilliant challenge for students, namely ‘Challenge’ Yi Zhongtian" 2007, Aug. 7
- Chinese Education News Online (中国教育新闻网) “Harvard student leaders and student participants at US-China Summit have a lively debate with Yi Zhongtian” 2007, Aug. 7
- China News Website (中新网) and Youth Newspaper (青年报) “Yi Zhongtian, the keynote speaker at HSYLC, emphasizes that student representatives should be well-read” 2007, Aug. 6

Regarding Cultural Exchange/Developing Student Leaders:

- Morning News (新闻晨报) “Outstanding Chinese and American student leaders interact in Shanghai” 2007, Aug. 6
- News Exchange Medium (文新传媒) “China and the United States strengthen exchange at 2007 student leaders summit opening” 2007, Aug. 6 Youth Newspaper “Harvard leaders to train and teach high school students” 2007, Aug. 6
