= Goldman Sachs Foundation =

American not-for-profit foundation

- Formation: 1999
- Type: Not-for-profit private foundation
- Tax ID no.: 31-1678646
- Headquarters: New York, NY, United States
- Chairman and CEO: John F. W. Rogers
- Key people: Asahi Pompey, President

The Goldman Sachs Foundation is a New York–based, not-for-profit private foundation that is a subsidiary of the financial services firm Goldman Sachs. The Foundation has the goal of bettering humanity worldwide, especially regarding health and education. In recent years its principal philanthropic projects have been: 10,000 Women, and 10,000 Small Businesses.

It is one of the world’s largest corporate foundations with hundreds of millions of dollars in assets.

== History ==
The foundation was founded in 1999, the same year Goldman Sachs went public, with an initial $200 million asset base. It was unusual in its creations attributes.

The foundation became especially active after the 2008 financial crisis. Between 2008 and 2013 it gave away some $1.6 billion. According to the New York Times, " Goldman is a firm that prides itself on discretion, but it isn’t giving away its billions quietly. It has bestowed the Goldman Sachs logo—and hundreds of millions of dollars—on two splashy programs, one that supports women in developing countries and another that helps small businesses."

Its initial president, and serving through January 2010, was Stephanie Bell-Rose, who had a background with the Andrew W. Mellon Foundation. She was succeeded as president in 2010 by Dina Habib Powell, who stayed in the position until January 2017 herself and who soon after her departure became a Deputy National Security Advisor (United States). Thereafter, leadership was assumed by John F. W. Rogers as Chair with the addition in 2019 by Asahi Pompey as President.

== Initiatives ==
Some of the Foundation's initiatives involve supporting and developing entrepreneurs around the world, including 10,000 Women and 10,000 Small Businesses. 10,000 Women provides women entrepreneurs in developing countries with business education, access to capital and mentors. Under Powell, Goldman Sachs partnered with International Finance Corporation and Overseas Private Investment Corporation to raise 600 million dollars, to provide access to capital for more than 100,000 women worldwide. Goldman's 10,000 Small Businesses, which was co-chaired by Lloyd Blankfein, Warren Buffett, Michael Bloomberg and Michael Porter of Harvard Business School, supports the growth and expansion of small business in the U.S. and UK.

In 2000, Prep for Prep partnered with the Goldman Sachs Foundation to establish the New York Metro Region Leadership Academy. According to a report on the Goldman Sachs Foundation signature initiative to develop high-potential youth. The Foundation only supported two cohorts of students (131 accepted) and the program had to end due to a lack of funding.

In 2001, the Foundation established Urban Investment Group (UIG). UIG invests in projects that promote economic development and revitalization in underserved urban communities.

In September 2006, the Parliament of Bangladesh ratified the landmark Charter of the Asian University for Women. The Charter endowed the University with institutional autonomy, academic freedom, and embedded it in the principle of non-discrimination. In 2005 and 2006, the Goldman Sachs Foundation and the Bill & Melinda Gates Foundation provided the start-up funds which enabled the university to become operational in 2008.

In 2006, Harvard Summit for Young Leaders in China, supported by the Goldman Sachs Foundation and American Airlines, recruited 37 students of Harvard University to create and teach a curriculum at a school in Shanghai. The program received extensive media attention across China, bringing approximately 600 high school students from among thousands of applicants to participate.
