= 10,000 Women =

Entrepreneur assistance program

10,000 Women Logo

10,000 Women is a program organized by Goldman Sachs and the Goldman Sachs Foundation with the goal of helping to grow local economies by providing business education, mentoring and networking, and access to capital to underserved women entrepreneurs globally. The program was announced on March 5, 2008, at Columbia University. The initiative is one of the largest philanthropic projects the bank has been involved with. The program was in its initial years run by Dina Habib Powell, a managing director at Goldman Sachs. Asahi Pompey, President of the Goldman Sachs Foundation, has led the program since 2019.

The program was continuing in 2022; Goldman Sachs published a report on the impact of the COVID-19 pandemic on female entrepreneursfrom the viewpoint of the 10,000 Women program.

== Award process ==
As part of the program, Goldman Sachs committed US$100 million in funding and partnered universities in Europe and the United States with business schools in developing and emerging economies.

Vital Voices presented the 10,000 Women Entrepreneurial Achievement Award at its annual Global Leadership Awards event from 2009 to 2011. The award was given to a graduate of the 10,000 Women program, sponsored by Goldman Sachs. Past recipients include Temituokpe Esisi of Nigeria (2009), Andeisha Farid of Afghanistan (2010) and Fatema Akbari of Afghanistan (2011).

In September 2013, Goldman Sachs launched a public Twitter presence for the 10,000 Women program using the screen name @GS10KWomen. In December 2015 the account had over 39,000 followers.

== Women Entrepreneurs Opportunity Facility ==
In March 2014, the World Bank's International Finance Corporation and Goldman Sachs 10,000 Women program launched a $600 million financing program called the Women Entrepreneurs Opportunity Facility to allow 100,000 women entrepreneurs in emerging markets to have access to financing. IFC invested an initial $100 million in the program, and Goldman Sachs Foundation provided $32 million, with an additional $486 million expected from public and private investors.

== Academic partners ==
- American University of Afghanistan
- American University of Beirut
- American University in Cairo
- Asian University for Women
- Babson College
- Birla Institute of Management Technology
- Brown University
- Columbia Business School
- Cuttington University
- Fundação Dom Cabral
- Fundação Getulio Vargas Escola de Administração de Empresas de São Paulo
- Harvard Business School
- Georgetown University/U.S. Afghan Women’s Council
- HEC Paris
- IE Business School
- IESE Business School
- Indian School of Business
- INSEAD (France and Singapore campuses)
- Judge Business School and Cambridge Assessment Group at the University of Cambridge
- London Business School
- MIT Sloan School of Management
- Mills College
- Monterrey Institute of Technology and Higher Education
- Özyegin University Center for Entrepreneurship (Turkey)
- Pan-Atlantic University, Nigeria
- School of Finance and Banking, Rwanda
- Saïd Business School
- Stanford Graduate School of Business
- Strathmore University, Kenya
- Symbiosis Institute of International Business
- Thunderbird School of Global Management
- Tsinghua University School of Economics and Management
- United States International University, Kenya
- University of Asia and the Pacific
- University of Cape Town Graduate School of Business
- University of Dar es Salaam
- University of Leeds
- Wharton School of the University of Pennsylvania
- William Davidson Institute at the University of Michigan
- Yale School of Public Health
- Zhejiang University

== See also ==
- 10,000 Small Businesses
