= 10,000 Small Businesses =

Philanthropic initiative

10,000 Small Businesses is a philanthropic initiative launched by Goldman Sachs and the Goldman Sachs Foundation in November 2009 that pledged $500 million in various aid to small businesses in the United States, United Kingdom, and France. The initiative aims to provide 10,000 small businesses with assistance – ranging from business and management education and mentoring to access to capital and business support services. Goldman Sachs' CEO Lloyd Blankfein, Berkshire Hathaway's Warren Buffett and Harvard Business School professor Michael Porter are the chairs of the program's advisory council. The program was launched in the face of mounting criticism over Goldman Sachs' large bonus payouts after repaying (with interest) $10 billion in TARP funds it received from the U.S. Treasury. According to the company, the small business initiative had been in development a year before the initial launch, and is modeled after its 10,000 Women Initiative, which has helped educate female entrepreneurs in 43 countries. According to a January 2013 report by Babson College, 63.7% of program participants in the United States reported an increase in revenue and 44.8% added new jobs following graduation. Asahi Pompey, President of the Goldman Sachs Foundation, has led the program since 2019.

== Program Overview ==
Under the plan, Goldman will provide $200 million to pay for small-business owners to get business and management education at local community colleges – the first program being at LaGuardia Community College in Queens, New York. Additionally, the program allocates $300 million in loans and grants to small businesses.

As of September 2013, small business owners in all 50 states can apply to the program through an online curriculum or at one of 13 community college sites. Networking and mentoring will be offered through partnerships with national and local business organizations, as well as employees of Goldman Sachs.

Additionally, in 2010 Goldman Sachs launched 10,000 Small Businesses UK which was originally offered in Yorkshire, the North West, the Midlands and London, with partners including Saïd Business School (University of Oxford), Leeds University Business School, Manchester Metropolitan University Business School, Aston Business School and University College London (UCL). The programme is now delivered nationally in partnership with Saïd Business School (University of Oxford) and Aston Business School.

=== Selection criteria ===
In the US, the plan targets companies employing at least four full-time employees and with revenue of at least $150,000 in the most recent fiscal year. Eligible companies have to have been operating for at least two years and work "predominantly in under served markets". In the UK, the programme targets businesses employing at least five full-time employees with revenue of at least £250,000, and a maximum of £15 million. Eligible companies in the UK need to have been operating for at least three years and be high growth. The applicant must be the most senior decision maker and, in most cases, the majority shareholder with majority control.

== Partners ==
The partner institutions and organizations include establishments in both academia and nonprofit sectors, as well as mission driven capital lenders.

== Social media ==
In February 2014 the Twitter handle @GS10KSmallBiz was launched by Goldman Sachs. In December 2015 the account had over 18,000 followers. Profiles of the 10,000 Small Businesses graduates of the programme in the US can be viewed on the Goldman Sachs YouTube playlist titled: Meet the Owners: 10,000 Small Businesses in the US. In the UK, more information about alumni of the programme and the application process can be found here: 10,000 Small Businesses website

== See also ==
=== College partners ===
- American Association of Community Colleges
- Association of Community College Trustees
- Babson College
- City Colleges of Chicago
- Community College of Philadelphia
- Cuyahoga Community College
- Delgado Community College
- Oakland Community College
- Houston Community College
- Lagos Business School
- LaGuardia Community College
- Long Beach City College
- Los Angeles City College
- Miami Dade College
- Macomb Community College
- Salt Lake Community College
- Wayne State University

=== Nonprofit partners ===
- Initiative for a Competitive Inner City
- National Federation of Independent Business
- National Urban League
- United States Hispanic Chamber of Commerce
- Greater Philadelphia Hispanic Chamber of Commerce

=== Other ===
- 10,000 Women
