= Alagappa Alagappan =

Personal life
- Born: December 3, 1925 Kanadukathan, India
- Died: October 24, 2014 (aged 88)

Religious life
- Religion: Hinduism

Alagappa Alagappan (December 3, 1925 - October 24, 2014) was the founder of the Hindu Temple Society of North America.

== Early life ==
Alagappan was born in Kanadukathan, India. Alagappan graduated with bachelor's and master's degrees from Presidency College in Chennai. Alagappan later received a master's degree from the London School of Economics and Political Science in international relations.

== Career ==
In London, Alagappan worked for BBC. Remarkably, while working at BBC, Alagappan interviewed a pope. After working at BBC, Alagappan returned to India and became a journalist for The Hindu. He went on to work at the United Nations in Bangkok and transferred to New York in 1961. Alagappan worked at the UN for 30 years and served as the deputy director of the natural resources and energy division.

== The Hindu Temple Society of North America ==
Algappan, along with a few others, established the Hindu Temple Society of North America in 1970. He served as the chairman of the temple till 2000.
