= Targeting of law firms and lawyers under the second Trump administration =

- Dates: February–April, 2025
- Firms specifically targeted by a presidential memo or executive order
- Covington & Burling; Elias Law Group; Jenner & Block; Paul, Weiss, Rifkind, Wharton & Garrison; Perkins Coie; Susman Godfrey; Wilmer Cutler Pickering Hale and Dorr
- Attorneys specifically targeted by a presidential memo or executive order
- Alvin Bragg; Norman Eisen; Marc Elias; Letitia James; Peter Koski; Lisa Monaco; Mark Pomerantz; James Quarles; Jack Smith; Andrew Weissmann; Mark Zaid; Aaron Zebley
- Litigation
- Doe 1 v. Equal Employment Opportunity Commission; Jenner & Block LLP v. Department of Justice; Perkins Coie LLP v. Department of Justice; Susman Godfrey LLP v. Executive Office of the President; Wilmer Cutler Pickering Hale and Dorr v. Executive Office of President; Zaid v. Executive Office of the President; American Bar Association v. Executive Office of the President
- $940 million pro bono services promised
- A&O Shearman: $125 million; Cadwalader, Wickersham & Taft: $100 million; Kirkland & Ellis: $125 million; Latham & Watkins: $125 million; Milbank: $100 million; Paul, Weiss, Rifkind, Wharton & Garrison: $40 million; Simpson Thacher & Bartlett: $125 million; Skadden, Arps, Slate, Meagher & Flom: $100 million; Willkie Farr & Gallagher: $100 million

The second administration of U.S. president Donald Trump has taken unprecedented actions targeting American law firms and lawyers that had previously represented positions adverse to Trump. This targeting of political opponents includes issuing executive orders (EOs) and presidential memoranda limiting the ability of attorneys to obtain access to government buildings, stopping any consideration for future employment with the government, canceling government contracts, and preventing any company that uses such a firm from obtaining federal contracts.

President Trump signed memoranda and orders that both threatened attorneys in general and targeted certain law firms and lawyers in particular. The Trump administration made efforts to influence practices by law firms, such as directing the Equal Employment Opportunity Commission (EEOC) to send letters to 20 law firms demanding information about each firm's diversity, equity, and inclusion (DEI) employment practices. Law firms and lawyers have responded in a variety of ways to these actions, with some firms and attorneys that were specific targets suing the Trump administration in response, resulting in six separate lawsuits against the administration. Paul, Weiss, Rifkind, Wharton & Garrison (Paul Weiss) is the sole law firm targeted by an executive order that did not sue the administration and instead made a deal with the administration to avoid sanctions and restore access.

In addition to Paul Weiss, eight other firms made preemptive deals with Trump to avoid being similarly targeted by executive orders. As part of the settlements, the nine law firms have agreed to provide a total of $940 million in pro bono work to efforts supported by the president and the firms. Trump later issued an executive order stating that the attorney general should create a mechanism to provide pro bono services to law enforcement officers who unjustly incur expenses defending their actions. Some have asserted that Trump intends to have the firms that settled provide such legal work. The administration also threatened to bring attorneys before disciplinary proceedings in an executive order, while individuals close to the administration simultaneously campaigned to become officials of the District of Columbia Bar, who would then oversee those proceedings for many of the attorneys.

Legal experts have stated that this effort of targeting of lawyers and law firms for the clients they represent could intimidate lawyers from representing certain clients in the future. Those firms that have sued over executive orders, to June 2025, have each prevailed in court, with favorable judicial rulings.

== Actions by the Trump administration ==
=== Presidential memorandum against Covington & Burling ===
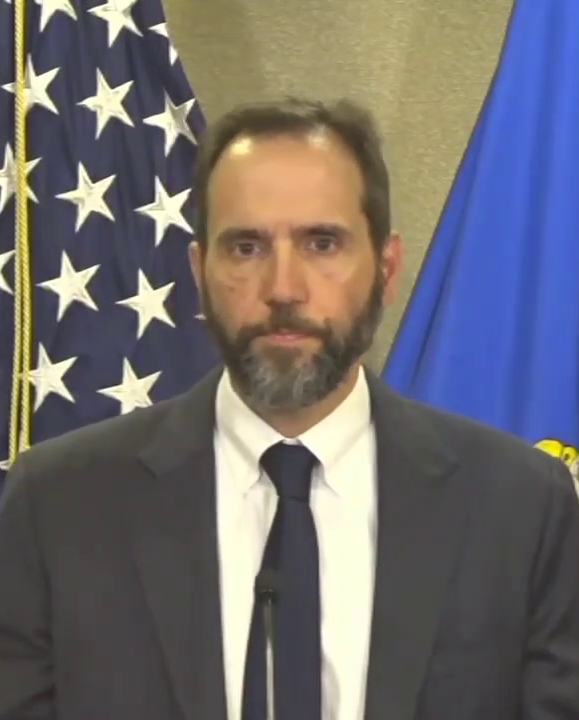
Jack Smith in 2023

On February 25, 2025, Trump issued a presidential memorandum directing the suspension of security clearances for Peter Koski and all members, partners, and employees of Covington & Burling LLP who assisted former special counsel Jack Smith during his tenure. The memorandum also instructed federal agencies to terminate any engagements with Covington & Burling and to review all government contracts with the firm, aligning agency funding decisions with the administration's priorities. Koski worked as a prosecutor at the U.S. Department of Justice (DOJ) investigating and prosecuting public corruption with Jack Smith, and later represented him on a pro bono basis. Smith led federal investigations and prosecutions of Trump in both an election obstruction case and a classified documents case. Covington & Burling responded by affirming that they would continue to represent Jack Smith despite the action against the firm.

=== Executive Order 14230 against Perkins Coie and related lawsuit ===
Perkins Coie LLP v. DOJ
- Court: United States District Court for the District of Columbia
- Started: March 11, 2025
- Docket nos.: 1:25-cv-00716

Court membership
- Judge sitting: Beryl Howell

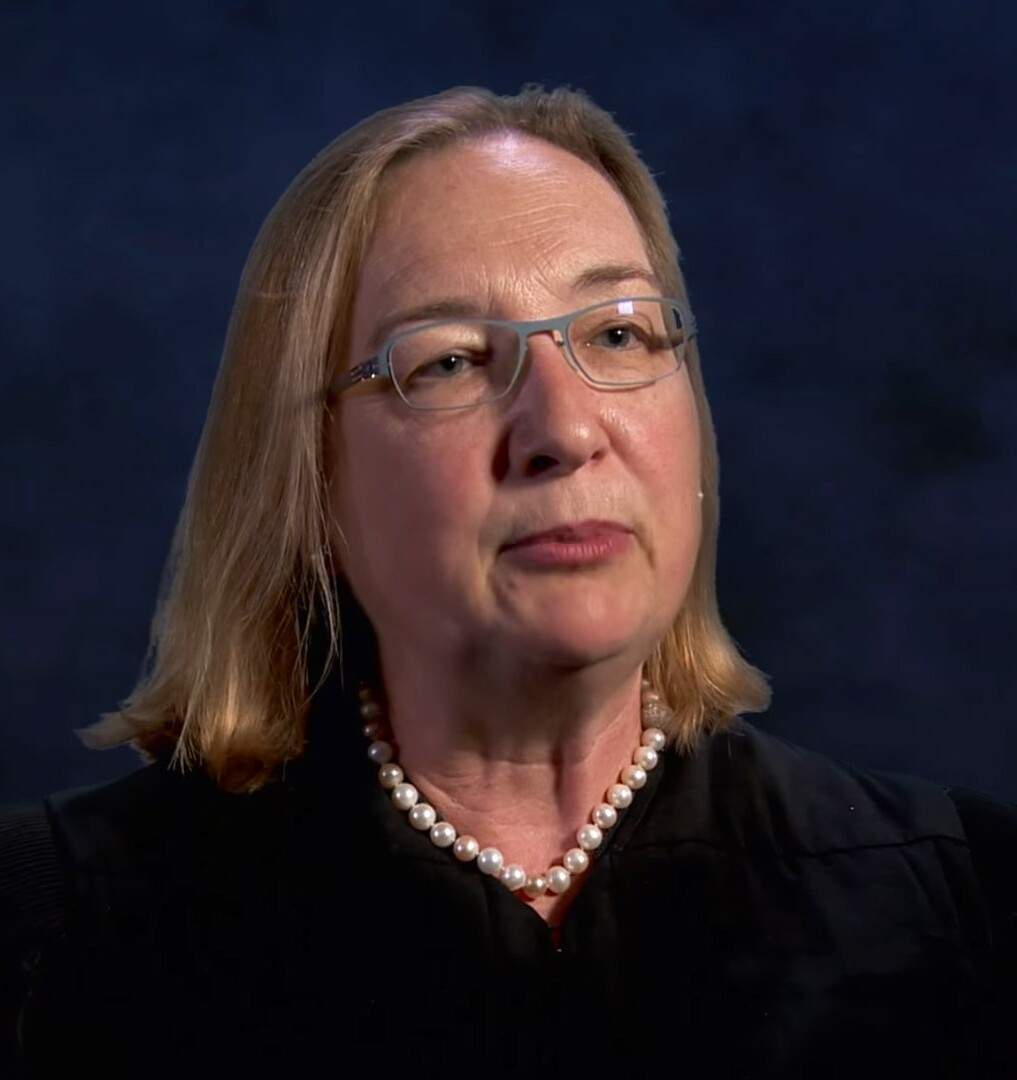
Judge Howell in 2018

On March 6, 2025, Trump issued Executive Order 14230 titled "Addressing Risks from Perkins Coie LLP." The EO suspended security clearances for the firm's employees, restricted their access to federal buildings, directed agencies to review and potentially terminate contracts with the firm, and ordered the government not to hire attorneys from the firm. The administration cited the firm's prior association with Hillary Clinton in her 2016 presidential campaign and its involvement in commissioning the opposition research that led to the Steele dossier, as well as criticizing the firm's diversity, equity, and inclusion (DEI) policies as undermining national interests.

In response to this action, Perkins Coie sued the Trump administration and stated that it was taking this action to protect the firm, to protect its clients, and to protect the legal system from an “unlawful attack on the Freedom of all Americans to select their counsel of choice without fear of retribution or punishment.” Perkins Coie also stated that they believed Trump's executive action was retribution against the firm for connections with Trump's political opponents and designed to “chill future lawyers from representing particular clients."

On March 12, Judge Beryl Howell of the US District Court for the District of Columbia temporarily blocked part of the EO against Perkins Coie related to barring attorneys in the law firm from entering government buildings as a violation of the First Amendment. Howell said that the order likely violated several constitutional amendments and "casts a chilling harm of blizzard proportion across the entire legal profession." Howell also stated that many lawyers were watching this case in horror. Howell, an appointee of former president Barack Obama, rejected a motion by the Department of Justice to have her removed from the case for being "insufficiently impartial". Perkins Coie was the first law firm to file suit to block the executive orders, and others would later file similar suits. Over 500 law firms signed an amicus brief in support of Perkins Coie's lawsuit.

On May 2, Howell permanently blocked the executive order, characterizing it as "an unprecedented attack" on the legal system and ruling that it "violates the Constitution and is thus null and void." DOJ filed a notice on June 30 that it would appeal Howell's ruling to the U.S. Court of Appeals for the District of Columbia Circuit.

=== Executive Order 14237 against Paul Weiss and settlement ===
On March 14, 2025, Trump issued Executive Order 14237 titled "Addressing Risks From Paul Weiss" that suspended security clearances for the firm's employees, restricted their access to federal buildings, and directed agencies to review and potentially terminate contracts with the firm.

In support of this action, the administration cited the firm's prior association with attorney Mark Pomerantz, who had helped prosecute Trump for falsifying business records; the firm's involvement in pro bono suits against those who participated in January 6; and asserted that the firm used diversity, equity, and inclusion (DEI) policies to discriminate against its employees. On March 19, Paul Weiss told a judge in a New Jersey case that it had been fired by a client because of the EO.

On March 20, the firm struck a deal with the Trump administration that the government would rescind the executive order in return for Paul Weiss committing $40 million toward pro bono legal services in support of Trump administration goals, ending diversity, equity, and inclusion policies, and issuing a public statement that Pomerantz had committed wrongdoing.

Trump then issued Executive Order 14244 titled "Addressing Remedial Action by Paul Weiss", rescinding order 14237, and stating that Paul Weiss recognized the "wrongdoing" of Pomerantz, agreed to policy changes to promote equality, agreed to a policy of political neutrality for hiring and representing clients, agreed to take on pro bono that would represent the "full political spectrum", committed to merit-based employment practices instead of DEI, and dedicated $40 million pro bono legal services during Trump's term to support "assisting our Nation's veterans, fairness in the justice system, and combating anti-Semitism; and other similar initiatives."

In response to the statements by the firm and the Trump administration, Pomerantz asserted that he had done nothing wrong in his role as a prosecutor.

The settlement by Paul Weiss was widely criticized, and viewed as "humiliating" in the legal profession, since no explicit requests were made of the firm by Trump. Journalist and legal commentator Mike Masnick described Paul Weiss's actions as "In short, they caved. They folded like a cheap suit. They made it clear that Paul Weiss not only won't fight for its clients, it won't fight for itself." Harvard Law School lecturer Deepak Gupta similarly asked: "Would you want to be represented by a law firm that can't even stand up for itself? A law firm that might sell you out to the federal government to save its own skin?"

The firm said that it deliberated on whether to fight the EO, but that fighting it would be problematic because doing so "would not solve the fundamental problem, which was that clients perceived our firm as being persona non grata with the Administration." Brad Karp wrote an email to staff stating that the firm struck the deal because the firm could not stop the effects of the executive order, that clients had told the firm that they were going to leave the firm as a result of the EO, and that the firm "would not be able to survive a protracted dispute with the Administration." The head of Paul Weiss stated that the executive order could have easily "destroyed our firm."

In February 2026, the revelation of Brad Karp's personal relationship with convicted criminal and sex offender Jeffrey Epstein was followed by Karp's resignation as the chair of Paul Weiss. The following month, Bloomberg Law reported, in March 2026, that the firm — which had positioned itself "as a bulwark against Trump" in 2018 — agreeing to provide $40 million in legal services to the Trump administration, one year prior, had weakened its reputation, and that other law firms struggled to meet the needs of pro bono work no longer performed by Paul Weiss as a result.

=== Presidential memorandum against specific lawyers and related lawsuit ===
Zaid v. Executive Office of the President
- Court: United States District Court for the District of Columbia
- Started: May 5, 2025
- Docket nos.: 1:25-cv-01365

On March 21, 2025, Trump issued a presidential memorandum, "Rescinding Security Clearances and Access to Classified Information from Specified Individuals". It revoked the clearances and access of 14 individuals, including several lawyers: Alvin Bragg, Norman Eisen, Letitia James, Lisa Monaco, Andrew Weissmann, and Mark Zaid. Zaid has represented whistleblowers in both Republican and Democratic administrations, among them the whistleblower whose complaint led to Trump's first impeachment, and he has filed suit challenging the constitutionality of the memorandum.

=== Memorandum generally against firms including Elias Law Group ===
On March 22, Trump issued a presidential memorandum, "Preventing Abuses of the Legal System and the Federal Court", targeting lawyers and law firms more generally if they filed "frivolous, unreasonable, and vexatious litigation" against the administration, as judged by the attorney general. The memo, again including revocation of security clearances and preventing any company that uses such a firm from getting federal contracts, has been seen as a threatening escalation and broadening of the president's campaign of retaliation against judges and lawyers who do not share his political views. A variety of people in the legal profession condemned the memorandum as an attempt to intimidate firms so that they would not take on clients who oppose government actions.

In the memorandum, Trump specifically mentioned the Elias Law Group LLP as being "deeply involved" in creating the "false" Steele dossier to influence the 2016 United States presidential election and sought to conceal the involvement of presidential candidate Hillary Clinton in the creation of the dossier. Marc Elias, the chair of Elias Law Group, responded to the allegations by claiming that Trump's goal was to have "lawyers and law firms to capitulate and cower until there is no one left to oppose his Administration in court" and that the Elias Law Group will continue to "fight for democracy" by not negotiating with Trump about who they represent and what cases they bring.

=== Executive Order 14246 against Jenner & Block and related lawsuit ===
Jenner & Block LLP v. U.S. Department of Justice
- Court: United States District Court for the District of Columbia
- Started: March 28, 2025
- Docket nos.: 1:25-cv-00916

Court membership
- Judge sitting: John D. Bates

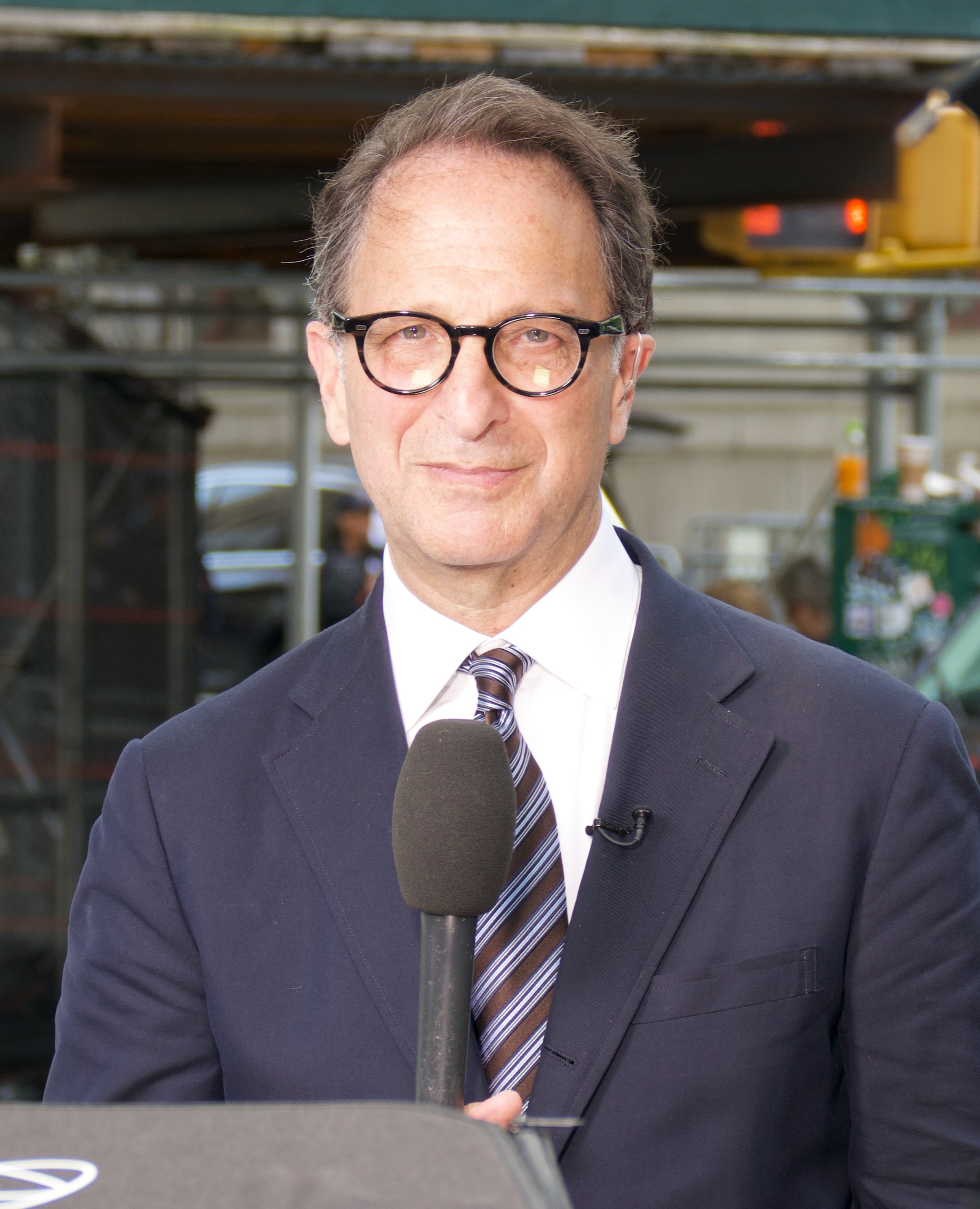
Andrew Weissmann in 2024

On March 25, 2025, Trump issued Executive Order 14246 titled "Addressing Risks From Jenner & Block." The order suspended security clearances for the firm's employees, restricted their access to federal buildings, and directed federal agencies to review and potentially terminate contracts with the firm. The administration cited the firm's prior association with attorney Andrew Weissmann, who had been involved in the Mueller special counsel investigation, as well as criticizing the firm's diversity, equity, and inclusion (DEI) policies.

Jenner & Block had represented clients that were against the Trump administration's positions in both its first and second term including supporting lawsuits regarding gender transition treatments, asylum rights, and funding of the Environmental Protection Agency. The firm also employs various individuals that served in Obama and Biden administrations, along with those who assisted with the investigation of the January 6 attack and Trump's 2016 presidential campaign. Officials from the White House stated that the administration was taking actions against Jenner & Block because of the firm's "weaponization of the legal system against American principles and values." Jenner & Block stated that this EO is very similar to those found unconstitutional, and that the firm was dedicated to serving its clients interest with integrity and would pursue its legal remedies to address the order.

On March 28, Jenner & Block sued the administration, and Judge John D. Bates, an appointee of President George W. Bush, quickly issued a temporary restraining order holding that the executive order likely violated the First, Fifth, and Sixth Amendments to the U.S. Constitution. In May 2025, it was revealed through litigation that the government had suspended the security clearance for a Jenner & Block lawyer due to the outstanding EO. On May 23, Bates ruled that the executive order was unconstitutional, as it "seeks to chill legal representation the administration doesn't like" in an effort to insulate the government from challenges. On July 21, the Department of Justice filed notice that it would appeal Bates' ruling.

=== Executive Order 14250 against WilmerHale and related lawsuit ===
Wilmer v. Executive Office of President
- Court: United States District Court for the District of Columbia
- Started: March 28, 2025
- Docket nos.: 1:25-cv-00917

Court membership
- Judge sitting: Richard J. Leon

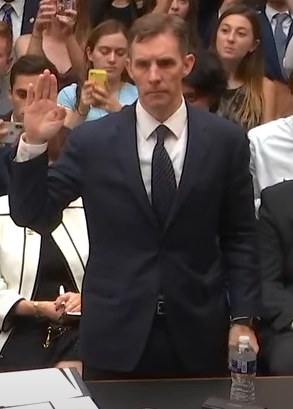
Aaron Zebley at Robert Mueller's House Intelligence Committee testimony in 2019

On March 27, 2025, Trump issued Executive Order 14250 titled "Addressing Risks From WilmerHale," targeting the law firm Wilmer Cutler Pickering Hale and Dorr (WilmerHale). The order suspended security clearances for the firm's employees, restricted their access to federal buildings, and directed federal agencies to review and potentially terminate contracts with the firm. The administration cited the firm's prior association with Special Counsel Robert Mueller and his team, as well as criticizing the firm's diversity, equity, and inclusion (DEI) policies.

On March 28, 2025, WilmerHale filed suit against the EO and hired Paul Clement to represent them. Clement said that this case was "absolutely critical to vindicating the First Amendment, our adversarial system of justice, and the rule of law."

In response to the lawsuit, U.S. District Judge Richard Leon issued a temporary restraining order blocking parts of the EO, stating in his opinion that "[t]here is no doubt this retaliatory action chills speech and legal advocacy, or that it qualifies as a constitutional harm"; that WilmerHale "faces crippling losses and its very survival is at stake"; that the harms suffered by the firm "would be so severe and would spill over to its clients and the justice system at large"; and that the "public interest demands protecting against harms of this magnitude." In May 2025, the firm said that the government had suspended the security clearance for two WilmerHale lawyers due to the outstanding EO. On May 27, Judge Leon struck down the executive order as unconstitutional, writing that "to rule otherwise would be unfaithful to the judgment and vision of the Founding Fathers!" The DOJ filed a notice of appeal on July 25.

=== Executive Order 14263 against Susman Godfrey and related lawsuit ===
Susman Godfrey LLP v. Executive Office of the President
- Court: United States District Court for the District of Columbia
- Started: April 11, 2025
- Docket nos.: 1:25-cv-01107

Court membership
- Judge sitting: Loren AliKhan

On April 9, 2025, Trump issued Executive Order 14263 titled "Addressing Risks From Susman Godfrey." The order alleged that the firm engaged in activities detrimental to U.S. interests, including representing Dominion Voting Systems in its lawsuits related to false claims that the 2020 presidential election was rigged against Trump including lawsuits against Fox News; Rudy Giuliani, Trump's personal attorney; and Sidney Powell, Trump's previous campaign attorney. The EO sought to suspend the firm's security clearances, restrict access to federal buildings, and direct agencies to review and potentially terminate contracts with the firm.

On April 11, Susman Godfrey LLP filed suit against the Trump administration, challenging the executive order as unconstitutional and asking the judge to freeze the order. The firm is represented by Donald Verrilli, who was solicitor general in the Obama administration. Susman Godfrey said that it believed in the rule of law, took the duty to uphold it seriously, and would fight the "unconstitutional order".

On April 15, after a hearing that same day, District Judge Loren AliKhan granted Susman Godfrey LLP's motion for a temporary restraining order, saying “The executive order specifically targets lawyers because of the clients that they represented. The executive order is based on a personal vendetta against a particular firm. And, frankly, I think the framers of our Constitution would view it as a shocking abuse of power.”

On April 23, Susman Godfrey filed a motion for summary judgement and permanent injunction. Judge AliKhan ruled that the EO was unconstitutional and granted the permanent injunction on June 27.

=== Deals with firms that wanted to avoid being subject to an executive order ===
On March 28, 2025, it was announced that the law firm of Skadden, Arps, Slate, Meagher & Flom LLP (Skadden) had agreed to make a deal with the Trump administration. This was the second deal, following the one that Paul Weiss had struck with the administration on March 20, and the first deal from a firm that had not been the subject of an executive order. As part of the deal, the Trump administration would not issue an EO against the firm, and in return the firm agreed to provide $100 million in "pro bono" work "to causes that the President and Skadden both support." Trump stated on Truth Social that the firm had also committed to not engage in the future in any "illegal DEI discrimination and preferences". Jeremy London, Skadden's executive partner, stated that it was "pleased to have achieved a successful agreement with President Trump and his Administration" and that it believed "that this outcome is in the best interests of our clients, our people, and our Firm." Following the announced deal, senior associate Brenna Frey resigned publicly with a statement issued on LinkedIn.

On April 1, 2025, it was announced that Willkie Farr & Gallagher (Willkie), a firm notable for having former second gentleman of the United States Douglas Emhoff as a partner, had reached a similar deal with Trump that Skadden had to avoid being targeted by the Trump administration. As with Skadden, Willkie agreed to "provide $100 million in legal services and not engage in diversity, equity and inclusion programs."

On April 2, Trump announced that he had a deal with Milbank similar to the deals with Skadden and Willkie. According to Trump's announcement, Milbank would agree to end "any DEI-based hiring practices", and "to perform at least $100 million worth of pro bono legal work to advance causes supported by the Trump administration, such as 'assisting veterans' and 'combatting antisemitism.'" Milbank also promised that its pro bono commitment would ensure that the firm took on cases that included "the full political spectrum, including Conservative ideals." Milbank's chairman, Scott Edelman, stated that the firm was "pleased we were so quickly able to find common ground" with the administration and stated in a letter to his staff that "[w]ith this agreement, we believe we have gone a long way to putting these issues behind us...in a way that allows us to continue to focus on the Firm's values and missions, including with respect to pro bono and our hope to foster an inclusive, non-discriminatory community where all of our members have an equal opportunity to succeed."

A similar deal to those above was reached on April 11, with firms Kirkland & Ellis, Latham & Watkins, A&O Shearman, and Simpson Thacher & Bartlett each agreeing to provide $125 million in pro bono legal services towards causes supported by Trump; while firm Cadwalader, Wickersham & Taft (Cadwalader) agreed to provide $100 million of such services.

In July Reuters reported that Skadden and Milbank had "joined efforts to challenge the administration".

==== Congressional investigation ====
Representative Jamie Raskin, the ranking Democrat on the House Judiciary Committee, and Senator Richard Blumenthal, the ranking Democrat on the Senate Permanent Subcommittee on Investigations, wrote to the White House and the firms, requesting information about the deals. On April 22, 2025, Raskin and Blumenthal stated that the replies they had received so far were "inadequate". Blumenthal voiced concern that the minimal responses suggest that the firms are hiding details and underscore the need to find out if they are being coerced "into providing free legal services to the president's pet causes".

=== Equal Employment Opportunity Commission letters and related lawsuit ===
Doe 1 v. Equal Employment Opportunity Commission
- Court: United States District Court for the District of Columbia
- Started: April 15, 2025
- Docket nos.: 1:25-cv-01124

Court membership
- Judge sitting: Reggie Walton

In addition to the executive actions and presidential memoranda that focused on specific law firms, the Equal Employment Opportunity Commission (EEOC) also sent letters on March 17, 2025, to twenty law firms, demanding information about their employment practices, and telling them that they were being investigated in relation to their diversity, equity, and inclusion (DEI) practices.

The law firms that received letters from Acting Chair Andrea Lucas include: A&O Shearman; Debevoise & Plimpton LLP; Cooley LLP; Freshfields Bruckhaus Deringer LLP; Goodwin Procter LLP; Hogan Lovells LLP; Kirkland & Ellis LLP; Latham & Watkins LLP; McDermott Will & Emery; Milbank LLP; Morgan, Lewis & Bockius LLP; Morrison & Foerster LLP; Perkins Coie; Reed Smith; Ropes & Gray LLP; Sidley Austin LLP; Simpson Thacher & Bartlett LLP; Skadden, Arps, Slate, Meagher & Flom LLP; White & Case LLP; and WilmerHale.

On April 15, three law students filed suit against the EEOC, alleging that it had exceeded its authority when it demanded information about firms' employment practices. The students had applied to a number of the firms targeted by the EEOC, and also claimed that the release of their information would constitute a breach of privacy.

On May 22, 2025, Bloomberg Law reported that Goodwin in response to the EEOC investigations had provided "more than 200 pages" to the Trump administration regarding its employment practices, had ended its association with Sponsors for Educational Opportunities legal fellowship, suspended its relationship with the Leadership Council for Legal Diversity, would no longer participate in Mansfield certification, and ended requirements for applicants to its fellowship program to demonstrate a “commitment to diversity, equity and inclusion”.

=== Executive Order 14288 on pro bono for law enforcement ===
On April 28, 2025, Trump issued Executive Order 14288 titled "Strengthening and Unleashing America's Law Enforcement to Pursue Criminals and Protect Innocent Citizens" that ordered the Attorney General to "create a mechanism" to provide resources to "law enforcement officers" that "unjustly" incurred legal expenses in the performance of their duties and that this "mechanism" includes the use of pro bono assistance from lawyers.

Of the nine firms that struck deals with the Trump administration for up to $940 million, eight of the agreements discuss providing pro bono services to "law enforcement." As a result, some have asserted that Trump intends to use those firms that he settled with to provide the pro bono services to law enforcement under a term of their deal. One "big lawyer partner" stated on Bluesky in response to the announcement: "Bet the Skadden associates are jazzed to learn they will be representing the DEFENSE side of Sec. 1983 cases pro bono." Marc Elias, who was specifically mentioned in a different EO, posted on social media: "Hey Paul Weiss associates — meet your new pro bono clients. It's ok, the Skadden associates are getting the coal companies."

== Attempt to win positions in the District of Columbia Bar ==
The District of Columbia Bar (DCB), which has over 120,000 members, has the power to decide who gets to be barred to practice within the District of Columbia as a lawyer and also oversees disciplinary actions including disbarring attorneys due to misconduct. The Trump administration has been critical of bar associations' review of Trump officials' actions and disbarment proceedings in the past.

In its executive actions, Trump made threats of potential disciplinary actions against lawyers. Critics claimed that President Trump's actions "will have a chilling effect on those taking on litigation against the administration — encouraging the attorney general to refer attorneys for disciplinary action if it is determined they have filed 'frivolous, unreasonable, and vexatious litigation'". The media noted that these threats also corresponded with people linked to the Trump administration running for the DCB, the organization that oversees disciplinary actions for lawyers barred in DC. Bradley Bondi, who is the brother of the Attorney General Pam Bondi, ran for president of the DCB, and Alicia Long, a deputy to Ed Martin who was Trump's interim US attorney for the District of Columbia, ran for treasurer of the DCB. The election for these positions runs from April to June 2025.

On June 9, 2025, Bradley Bondi lost the DCB presidential election with less than 10% of the vote to employment attorney Diane Seltzer with a record turnout of more than 38,000 voters, more than "five times as many voters in a typical election". Alicia Long also lost, to Microsoft attorney Amanda Molina who won about 75% of the vote.

== Reactions ==
The series of actions against lawyers and law firms quickly started having the effect of making it harder for those who oppose Trump administration actions to find lawyers who would agree to represent them. Law firms that had not been targeted by Trump responded to his attacks on the profession in varied ways. The initial response was often silence, although a few firms issued public statements early on, such as Albert Sellars LLP, whose response was a concise "Fuck that fascist nonsense." Reuters analyzed the websites of the 50 highest-grossing law firms, and found that as of July 31, 2025, 46 had removed or edited content related to diversity, equity and inclusion; 17 had edited text about their pro bono services in areas like immigration and racial justice; and three featured work consistent with the administration's public goals, for example, combating antisemitism and assisting veterans. A pro bono director at one firm said that its pro bono work was now carried out confidentially. The Appleseed Center for Law and Justice in the District of Columbia similarly reported that firms providing pro bono assistance had asked to remain anonymous. Reuters' assessment of court dockets found "a sharp decline in major firms challenging government policies".

A significant number of firms signed on to an open letter to the attorney general, asking her "to oppose attacks on the legal profession, on judges, and on the rule of law and to ensure that the Department of Justice uses its full power to protect the legal profession and equal justice under law for all people." Signatories to the letter also included over 4,000 lawyers and legal organizations.

Claire Finkelstein, a law professor at the University of Pennsylvania, said the goal of these executive orders was to "intimidate professionals, to intimidate the legal profession from engaging in professional activities that go against Donald Trump and the current administration." University of California, Los Angeles (UCLA) law professor Scott Cummings and a former senior Justice Department official have both called Trump's moves attacking law firms and targeting lawyers "authoritarian". Cummings, who directs UCLA's program on legal ethics and democracy, also wrote about Trump's strategic inclusion of pro bono work in the agreements he made with law firms: not only does this provide legal support for causes Trump wants to support, but it reduces the amount of pro bono services that the firms can donate to organizations whose work Trump wishes to thwart, and it creates conflicts of interest for the firms. Senior American Civil Liberties Union attorney Ben Wizner said Trump's threats are an attempt to "chill and intimidate" lawyers who challenge him. Former UK Supreme Court Justice Lord Sumption said: “It's the kind of thing that happened in Italy and Germany between the wars. It is something that is a disgrace to the political and legal traditions of the most ancient democracy in the world.”

The American Bar Association released a statement encouraging everyone in the profession to stand up against Trump's "efforts to undermine the courts and the legal profession", following that with another statement joined by over 50 smaller bar associations across the country. The deans of nearly 80 law schools from across the country signed a joint letter condemning the administration's actions, stating that "Punishing lawyers for their representation and advocacy violates the First Amendment and undermines the Sixth Amendment." Democratic state attorneys general sent a joint letter as well, condemning Trump's attempts to undermine the rule of law. Eighty-two law school professors of Harvard Law School's 118 active professors signed an open letter condemning the Trump administration's actions against law firms. Pension Benefit Guaranty Corporation (PBGC) attorney and agency pro bono leader Justin B. Finn called on bar associations to obscure the nature of pro bono service by adopting Helpers’ Verification Programs “to provide pro bono attorneys with subject-neutral and organization-anonymous verification of pro bono service upon request.”

On June 16, 2025, the American Bar Association (ABA) sued the Trump administration, describing the executive orders as part of a policy intended "to intimidate and coerce law firms and lawyers to refrain from challenging the President or his Administration in court, or from even speaking publicly in support of policies or causes that the President does not like." The ABA is represented in the suit by Susman Godfrey, a firm targeted by one of the EOs.

=== Attorney departures and related actions ===
Rachel Cohen, an associate at Skadden, organized an open letter in mid-March, inviting other associates to sign on. The letter, addressed to large law firms, called on them to take a stand. As of March 27, 2025, over 1500 associates had signed it. On March 21, Cohen also submitted a conditional resignation letter, urging Skadden to fight Trump's actions; instead, they locked her out of their systems the same day. Cohen called the administration's actions an "existential" risk to the matter of law, stating that firms need to be united in condemnation, and that high-profile U.S. lawyers "have an obligation to protect [the] legal system itself."

After Skadden approached the Trump administration to reach an agreement before being targeted with an executive order, two other associates, Brenna Trout Frey and Thomas Sipp, resigned. Trout Frey characterized the agreement as "a craven attempt to sacrifice the rule of law for self-preservation", and added that "if my employer cannot stand up for the rule of law, then I cannot ethically continue to work for them." She encouraged her colleagues to join her. Sipp said that "we are sliding into an autocracy where those in power are above the rule of law. ... Skadden is on the wrong side of history. I could no longer stay knowing that someday I would have to explain why I stayed." Many alumni from both Skadden and Paul Weiss signed open letters condemning their choice to agree to Trump's terms, expressing disappointment and outrage. The letter from Paul Weiss alumni stated "Instead of a ringing defense of the values of democracy, we witnessed a craven surrender to, and thus complicity in, what is perhaps the gravest threat to the independence of the legal profession since at least the days of Senator Joseph McCarthy."

Abbe Lowell, a defense attorney who has represented high-profile clients such as Hunter Biden and Jared Kushner, decided to leave his partnership at Winston & Strawn and launch a small firm, Lowell & Associates, to represent those who were targeted by the Trump administration. He hired Rachel Cohen and Brenna Trout Frey, who had left Skadden in protest of its deal with the administration. The firm also represents Mark Zaid and New York Attorney General Letitia James, two of the lawyers singled out by Trump. Lowell said that although the firm's most important commitment is to his clients, he also aims to defend the legal system by upholding the rule of law.

There were reports in April and May 2025 that Cadwalader was suffering from numerous attorney departures as a result of the deal made with the Trump administration that was testing the firm.

Above the Law published a "Biglaw Spine Index: Response to EOs targeting Biglaw" chart on April 4.

On April 17, 2025, Rachel Cohen and University of Virginia law professor Kevin Cope, writing in Slate, argued that the law firm executive order incident created a prisoner's dilemma, and they called for law students seeking employment to solve the dilemma by boycotting the capitulating firms. Others, such as Berkeley Law School Dean Erwin Chemerinsky, also urged law students making career decisions to consider how the targeted firms responded.

On May 14, 2025, Rachel Cohen along with Andrew Silberstein (a previous associate at Willkie) and a former Kirkland & Ellis associate launched an effort to remove those attorneys that had been executive committee members at the firms that decided to make a deal with Trump from boards of other non-profit organizations and companies.

Paul, Weiss attorneys Steven Banks and former Homeland Security secretary Jeh Johnson announced their departures from the firm, followed, on May 23, 2025, by The New York Times reporting that partners Karen Dunn, Bill Isaacson, Jeannie Rhee and Jessica Phillips would leave and form their own firm, avoiding President Trump's executive order, which is expected to restrict firm business.

=== Administration reaction ===
In remarks delivered with the Governor of Louisiana, President Trump told reporters that he thinks "The law firms have to behave themselves, and we've proven that." White House press secretary Karoline Leavitt told The New York Times: "Big Law continues to bend the knee to President Trump because they know they were wrong, and he looks forward to putting their pro bono legal concessions toward implementing his America First agenda."

Following similar deals agreed with the Trump presidency by major law firms Willkie Farr & Gallagher and Skadden, Arps, Slate, Meagher & Flom, the president was quoted as stating

They're all bending and saying: "Sir, thank you very much." Nobody can believe it. Law firms are just saying: "Where do I sign? Where do I sign?"

On April 8, 2025, Donald Trump commented further on the situation, stating "Have you noticed that lots of law firms have been signing up with Trump?... $100 million, another $100 million for, uh, damages that they've done. They give you $100 million and then they announce that, 'But we have done nothing wrong.' And I agree, they've done nothing wrong. But what the hell, they give me a lot of money considering they've done nothing wrong."

On March 2, 2026, Department of Justice voluntarily asked the United States Court of Appeals for the District of Columbia Circuit to dismiss its appeals of the four lower court judgments in the cases. The Trump administration then changed its mind, and the next day the Department of Justice asked the appeals court to allow it to continue its appeals in the four cases. Two weeks later, the court granted the Department's motion to withdraw its motion to dismiss the appeals.

=== Client responses to firm actions ===
By June 2025, 11 law firm client companies, including Oracle, Morgan Stanley, Microsoft, and McDonald's were reported as shifting business toward those targeted firms that did not settle with the Trump administration, away from those that had caved in. In court filings, among law firms acting against targeted EOs, are reports of some "anxious clients" and loss of business.

== Firms that fought 2025 executive orders ==
Perkins Coie, Wilmer Hale, Jenner & Block and Susman Godfrey engaged the court against these executive orders and won favorable judgment; the U.S. DOJ dropped the cases. In April 2025, the four law firms jointly retained former U.S. Solicitor General Paul Clement to argue in the U.S. Court of Appeals for the District of Columbia Circuit against the revival of EOs against them, then under appeal by DOJ.

Subsequently, The American Lawyer jointly named eight firms as Law Firm of the Year in 2025, including four firms for successful challenges to the executive orders, and four others — Clement & Murphy, Cooley, Munger, Tolles & Olson, and Williams & Connolly — for legal representations of those firms.

== Firms that did not fight 2025 executive orders ==
The firms that chose to accept the terms of the EOs are: Paul Weiss, A&O Shearman; Cadwalader, Wickersham & Taft; Kirkland & Ellis; Latham & Watkins; Milbank; Simpson Thacher & Bartlett; Skadden Arps; and Willkie Farr & Gallagher.

== See also ==
- 2025 dismissals of inspectors general
- 2025 U.S. Department of Justice resignations
- American Bar Association § 2025 federal lawsuit and member targeting by the Trump administration
- United States v. Russell (2025)
- Southern Poverty Law Center § Federal indictment
- Judge Hannah Dugan § 2025 I.C.E. courthouse arrests
