= Dunn Isaacson Rhee LLP =

American litigation law firm

- Headquarters: Washington, D.C., U.S.
- No. of offices: 3
- No. of attorneys: 34 (2026)
- Major practice areas: Litigation, government investigations, crisis management
- Key people: Karen Dunn, William Isaacson, Jeannie Rhee, Jessica Phillips (founding partners)
- Date founded: May 2025; 1 year ago
- Founder: Karen Dunn; William Isaacson; Jeannie Rhee; Jessica Phillips
- Company type: Limited liability partnership
- Website: www.dirllp.com

Dunn Isaacson Rhee LLP (DIR) is an American litigation boutique law firm headquartered in Washington, D.C., with offices in New York City and San Francisco. The firm was founded in May 2025 by Karen Dunn, William Isaacson, Jeannie Rhee, and Jessica Phillips, four litigation partners who left Paul, Weiss, Rifkind, Wharton & Garrison to start their own practice. Its practice focuses on trial litigation, government and internal investigations, and crisis management, and its clients have included Google and Meta Platforms.

The firm's launch drew wide attention in the American legal profession because it followed Paul Weiss's March 2025 agreement with the Trump administration, under which the firm pledged $40 million in pro bono legal services in exchange for the rescission of an executive order targeting it.

== History ==
=== Founding ===
In March 2025, President Donald Trump issued an executive order targeting Paul Weiss, citing among other things the firm's ties to lawyers who had participated in investigations of Trump, including Jeannie Rhee's work on Special Counsel Robert Mueller's investigation of Russian interference in the 2016 presidential election. Paul Weiss subsequently reached an agreement with the White House under which the order was rescinded in exchange for a pledge of $40 million in pro bono legal services for causes supported by the administration and changes to the firm's diversity policies. The agreement, the first of several such deals between large law firms and the administration, was widely criticized within the legal profession.

On May 23, 2025, Dunn, Isaacson, Rhee, and Phillips notified Paul Weiss partners by email that they were leaving to start a new law firm. Dunn had co-chaired Paul Weiss's litigation department, and Rhee had been managing partner of its Washington, D.C. office. The founders did not publicly connect their departure to Paul Weiss's agreement with the administration, and declined to comment on the deal, but Bloomberg Law reported that they sought the ability to litigate against the Trump administration without limitations. In the firm's first media interview, Rhee said that "one of the things that we really value is our independence."

Dunn, Isaacson, and Phillips had previously practiced together at Boies Schiller Flexner before moving to Paul Weiss in 2020; Rhee joined Paul Weiss in 2019 from the United States Department of Justice, where she had served on the Mueller special counsel team.

=== Growth ===
The firm grew rapidly in its first months by recruiting from Paul Weiss. By mid-June 2025, seven former Paul Weiss partners — including Melissa Zappala, Rush Atkinson, and Kyle Smith — and several associates had joined. Antitrust partners Martha Goodman and Amy Mauser followed later that month, and in late June the firm added Erin Morgan in New York and Meredith Dearborn in San Francisco, bringing its headcount to roughly 20 lawyers and completing the transfer of the team defending Google in antitrust litigation over Android app distribution. By July 2025 the firm had 26 lawyers, and it opened offices in New York and San Francisco during its first year.

In August 2025, the firm hired John Paredes, a constitutional litigator, from the nonprofit Protect Democracy. A firm spokesperson said that the firm expected its litigation practice to include matters adverse to the Trump administration. In April 2026, Danielle Conley and Jude Volek, both former lawyers in the Biden White House, joined as partners from Latham & Watkins. As of June 2026, the firm had 34 attorneys, including recruits from Paul Weiss, Willkie Farr & Gallagher, and other large firms.

In December 2025, the firm paid associates year-end bonuses of up to $175,000 without billable-hour requirements, and it paid additional bonuses in mid-2026 after its first anniversary.

== Notable matters ==
Firm attorneys, led by Dunn, represent Google in United States v. Google, the Justice Department's advertising technology antitrust case, having continued the representation after leaving Paul Weiss. In April 2025, Judge Leonie Brinkema of the United States District Court for the Eastern District of Virginia found that Google had illegally monopolized the markets for publisher ad servers and ad exchanges. The remedies phase was tried in September 2025, and at closing arguments on November 21, 2025, Dunn argued against the government's proposed divestiture of Google's ad exchange, urging behavioral remedies instead. A remedies decision was expected in 2026.

Firm attorneys also defend Google in antitrust litigation over Android app distribution. The firm serves as co-counsel with Paul Weiss on a number of matters that predate its founding, including for Meta Platforms, and Bloomberg Law reported in 2026 that the firm's clients have included Google, Meta, and former federal prosecutor Andrew Weissmann.

== Notable people ==
- Karen Dunn – founding partner; former co-chair of Paul Weiss's litigation department and adviser to Kamala Harris; lead counsel for Google in the Justice Department's advertising technology antitrust case; member of the plaintiffs' trial team in Sines v. Kessler
- William Isaacson – founding partner; antitrust litigator named "Litigator of the Year" by The American Lawyer in 2016; former law clerk to Judge Harrison L. Winter of the United States Court of Appeals for the Fourth Circuit
- Jeannie Rhee – founding partner; former member of the Mueller special counsel team, federal prosecutor, and attorney in the Justice Department's Office of Legal Counsel; former managing partner of Paul Weiss's Washington office; previously represented Hillary Clinton in litigation concerning her private email server
- Jessica Phillips – founding partner; member of the plaintiffs' trial team in Sines v. Kessler; previously a partner at Boies Schiller Flexner and Paul Weiss
- Rush Atkinson – partner; former member of the Mueller special counsel team
- Danielle Conley – partner; former deputy counsel to President Biden

== Recognition ==
Chambers and Partners ranked the firm in its USA 2026 guide in antitrust, general commercial litigation, and white-collar and government investigations categories. The firm and its founding partners are also ranked by Benchmark Litigation, which described its May 2025 launch as a significant event in the litigation market.
