= Profiles in Cowardice =

2026 non-fiction book by Jacob Weisberg

- Author: Jacob Weisberg
- Publisher: Penguin Press
- Publication date: September 15, 2026
- ISBN: 979-8-217-06259-1

Profiles in Cowardice: A Study of Collaboration in the Trump Era is a 2026 nonfiction book by journalist Jacob Weisberg, focused on the people and institutions that have supported Donald Trump and his second presidential administration. The book's title is an allusion to Profiles In Courage, a book written in the 1950s by then-Senator John F. Kennedy focusing on eight US senators who had made unpopular decisions.

== Contents ==
The book discusses eight public figures Weisberg describes as enablers of Donald Trump. These include:

- Mitch McConnell, Republican senator from Kentucky
- John Roberts, Chief Justice of the United States Supreme Court
- Brad Karp, chairman of law firm Paul, Weiss, Rifkind, Wharton & Garrison
- George W. Bush, 43rd President of the United States
- Megyn Kelly, journalist
- Jeff Bezos, Founder and former CEO of Amazon
- Sian Beilock, President of Dartmouth College
- Stephen Schwarzman, Founder and CEO of Blackstone

== See also ==
- Call It Evil: Understanding the Trump Era – a related book by philosopher Susan Neiman
