= Learning from the Germans =

2019 non-fiction book by Susan Neiman

Learning from the Germans: Race and the Memory of Evil
- First edition
- Author: Susan Neiman
- Genre: Non-fiction
- Publisher: Farrar, Straus and Giroux
- Publication date: 2019

Learning from the Germans: Race and the Memory of Evil is a 2019 non-fiction book by Susan Neiman, published by Farrar, Straus and Giroux in the United States and by Allen Lane in the United Kingdom. The author argues that German society has largely accepted responsibility for and learned from its past actions, particularly during World War II. In contrast, she argues that the United States had not done the same, particularly with regard to harm done during the Jim Crow era.

Neiman has stated that while each country has its own history, studying Germany’s history shows that society can atone for past crimes and improve even though doing so is a difficult process. More specifically, Neiman believes that many Americans lack an understanding of the United States Civil War as well as the Jim Crow period, contributing to issues in modern American society. She believes the United States would benefit from its own corresponding Vergangenheitsbewältigung.

== Background ==
Neiman, a Jewish woman, who was born in the Southern United States, had lived there for a portion of her youth. Neiman's mother, who originated from Chicago, had worked to ensure racial integration at Atlanta Public Schools during the Civil Rights Movement of the mid-20th century. Neiman resided in Berlin, Germany beginning in 1989 to study the philosophy of Immanuel Kant and resided there for a period of at least 22 years. She became a moral philosopher, and in Berlin she became the head of the Einstein Forum.

The idea for the book came to her when she noticed American society still honoring or commemorating the Confederate States of America even though President of the United States Barack Obama had publicly condemned racism the Charleston church shooting. She spent at least three years conducting research for the book; that involved reading works about post-Nazi Germany, which describe how Germans initially did not feel guilty about the events. In addition to interviewing people in Germany, as part of this task she traveled to the United States and conducted interviews there too; she visited Mississippi in that process. The author said that she incorporated about 50% of the interviews in the book.

The process of the book began prior to the 2016 United States Presidential Election and the Brexit referendum, and she stated that prior to the former she believed the United States was about to absorb messages from historical incidents. The author completed the book despite concerns that the message may not be absorbed in light of the outcomes of those events.

== Contents ==
The book discusses how society in both East Germany and West Germany initially resisted taking responsibility for World War II incidents, but that this understanding developed decades after the war. This solidified after the reunification of Germany as the two halves could no longer assign blame to the other for atrocities. According to Neiman, East German society had more thoroughly opposed Nazism than West Germany partly because the latter opposed Soviet-aligned states with people who formerly worked for Nazi Germany. The book also discusses the Charleston Church Shooting.

== Reception ==
Deborah E. Lipstadt wrote in The New York Times that the work "is an important and welcome weapon in" cultural battles about historical events, and that while "Optimally, a reviewer’s evaluation should not be influenced by where she read a book", her understanding was enhanced by what she calls attempts from the government of Poland to minimize Polish culpability in the Holocaust.

Alex Clark of The Guardian wrote that the author "is fascinating and potent on how the Holocaust has functioned on multiple planes, and primarily as an example of pure evil that, by consequence, allows other societies to divert attention from their own misdeeds."

Kirkus Reviews stated that the work is "A timely, urgent call to revisit the past with an eye to correction and remedy." The publication added that "While direct equations between, say, the American secessionists and the Nazis are problematic, there are plenty of points in common."

Neiman's treatment of Communism and the East German regime in Learning from the Germans: Race and the Memory of Evil has attracted the attention of more skeptical reviewers. Neiman writes that "anti-fascist" sentiments were genuine in the GDR and that "East Germany did a better job of working off the Nazi past than West Germany." McElvoy writes that "where the account goes awfully wrong is in the musings on East Germany, where Neiman is prone to accepting the GDR’s self-serving use of its “anti-fascist” badging at a face value it never merited, despite the good faith of many cultural figures in the idea." McElvoy continues, "The account of the east today is a medley of interviews with a lot of people from the 1989 opposition movements. It would be a bit like talking about Brexit Britain through the eyes of a lot of Remainers and Lib Dems. The narrative of “colonisation” of the east by the west after unification is treated unsceptically."

Some reviewers took issue with Neiman's omission of Soviet crimes, such as the rape of many German women and girls towards the end of the war. Reviewer Heather Souvaine Horn writes "does the monument to fallen Soviet soldiers in East Berlin really represent a society coming to terms with history? Or does it represent a particularly grisly form of forgetting?" Historian Thomas Laqueur makes similar comments in his review, writing that "it’s worth considering the amnesia that monuments like the one in Treptower Park induce", noting that the rapes were not discussed publicly for decades.

In 2023, Neiman voiced criticism of German memory culture, saying that it had "gone haywire" and descended into "a philosemitic McCarthyism" in terms of reflexive support for Israel.
