= Call It Evil =

2026 book by Susan Neiman

- Author: Susan Neiman
- Publisher: W. W. Norton & Company
- Publication date: September 15, 2026
- ISBN: 978-1-324-13104-5

Call It Evil: Understanding the Trump Era is a 2026 nonfiction book by American philosopher Susan Neiman on the nature of systemic evil in collective settings. Neiman writes that evil begins "When self-interest becomes the basis of reason, evil no longer needs to justify itself," adding. "It’s already been mistaken for rationality."

== Reception ==
In July 2026, Call it Evil was listed on Lit Hub’s Most Anticipated Books of 2026.

A review in The New York Times by Jennifer Szalai wrote the book "is less a philosophical exploration than a polemical guide to the current moment."

In an opinion piece in The New York Times, Michelle Goldberg wrote that Call It Evil should be considered a companion to Profiles in Cowardice: A Study of Collaboration in the Trump Era (2026) by Jacob Weisberg, which focuses on the people and institutions that have aided Trump in his second presidency.
