= Samuel W. Block =

American lawyer (1911–1970)

Samuel W. Block (1911–1970) was an American lawyer and one of the name partners at Jenner & Block.

Block was born in 1911 in Saint Joseph, Missouri. He attended Yale University, receiving his A.B. in 1933. He then attended Harvard Law School, graduating in 1936.

Upon graduation in 1936, Block moved to Chicago to join the firm of Poppenheusen, Johnston, Thompson and Cole (the predecessor firm of Jenner & Block). He became a partner at the law firm in 1948, and a name partner in 1964, when the firm became known as "Jenner & Block".

Block's practice focused on antitrust and securities litigation and takeovers, for clients such as Flying Tiger Line and Gulf+Western. Although he mainly focused on corporate transactions, his securities litigation practice did see him occasionally in court, even arguing before the Supreme Court of the United States, e.g. in Surowitz v. Hilton Hotels Corp., 383 U.S. 363 (1966).
