= Ashurst LLP =

Multinational law firm

Ashurst
- No. of offices: 30
- No. of lawyers: 1,600+
- No. of employees: 2,800+
- Major practice areas: General practice
- Key people: Karen Davies (Chairman); Paul Jenkins (Chief Executive Officer)
- Date founded: 1822
- Company type: Limited liability partnership
- Dissolved: June 2026
- Website: www.ashurst.com

Ashurst was a British multinational law firm headquartered in London. It had 30 offices in 18 countries across Asia, Australia, Europe, the Middle East and North America. Ashurst was 55th in the list of 100 largest law firms in the world by revenue, and 6th in the list of largest UK law firms by revenue.

Its principal business focus was in mergers and acquisitions, corporate and structured finance. The firm also had practices in other areas including investment funds, antitrust, energy, transport and infrastructure, intellectual property, IT, dispute resolution, financial services, tax, real estate, regulatory, telecommunication and employment.

In June 2026, the firm merged with Perkins Coie to form Ashurst Perkins Coie.

== History ==
=== Ashurst Morris Crisp ===
The firm was founded by William H. Ashurst in 1822. John Morris, and Sir Frank Crisp were recruited to the firm in the 1860s.

=== Growth and financial crisis ===
In November 2008, the firm voted in corporate partner Charlie Geffen to succeed Geoffrey Green as senior partner.

=== Combination with Blake Dawson ===
On 1 March 2012, Ashurst merged its Asian business with that of Australian law firm Blake Dawson, a member of the Big Six, Blake Dawson being renamed as Ashurst across all offices. Ashurst also gained new offices in Adelaide, Brisbane, Canberra, Jakarta, Melbourne, Perth, Port Moresby, Shanghai and Sydney. This significantly increased Ashurst's resources in the energy, resources, infrastructure and financial services sectors.

=== Combination forming Ashurst Perkins Coie ===
On 17 November 2025, Ashurst announced a merger with the Seattle headquartered firm of Perkins Coie, to form Ashurst Perkins Coie, with 3,000 attorneys. The following April, the partners of both firms voted in support of the merger, which was completed in June 2026.
