= Ashurst Perkins Coie =

International law firm established in 2026

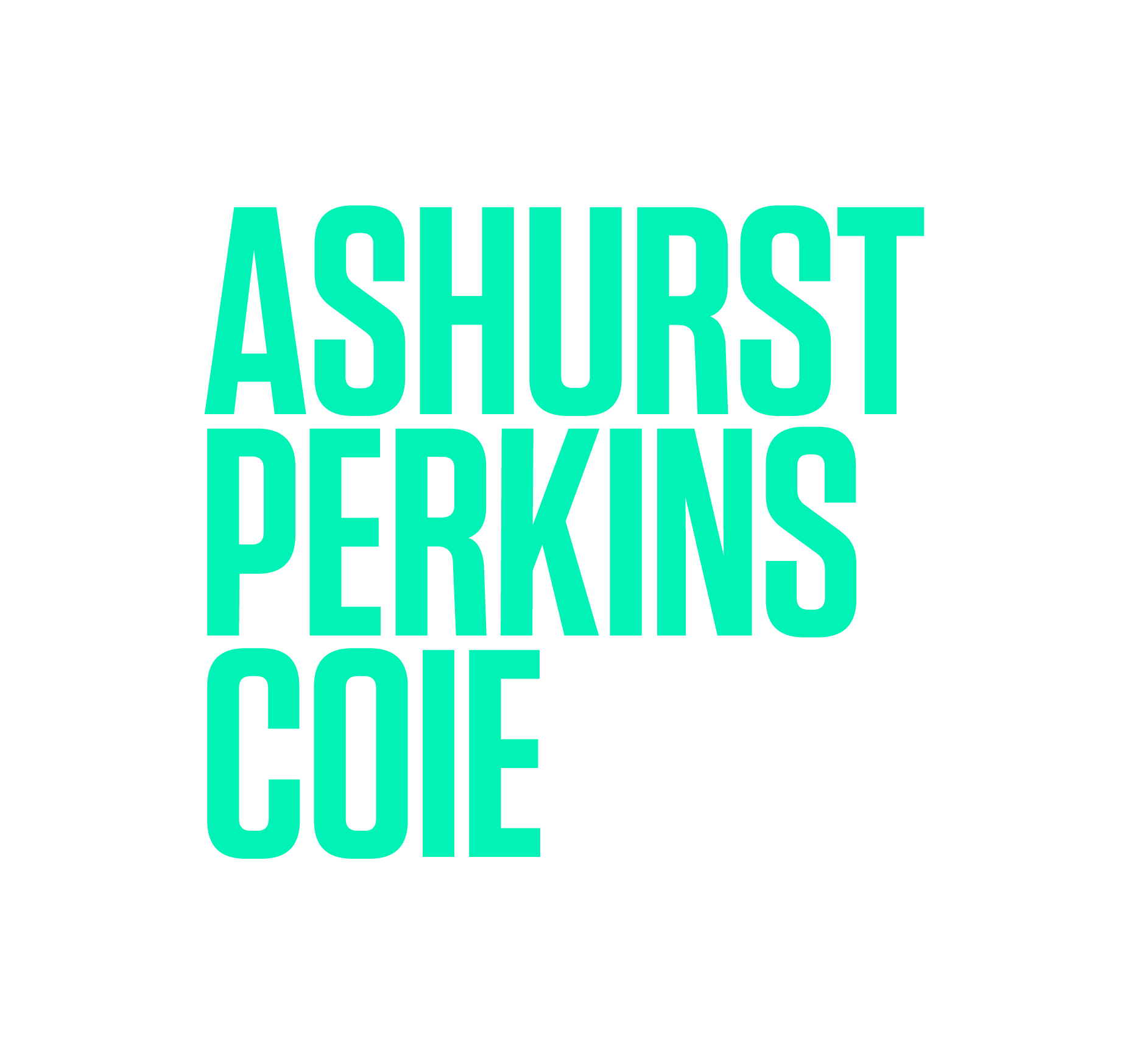
- No. of offices: 52
- No. of attorneys: Approximately 3,000 (2026)
- Major practice areas: General practice
- Key people: Paul Jenkins (global co-CEO); Bill Malley (global co-CEO); Karen Davies (global co-chair); Brian Eiting (global co-chair)
- Revenue: Approximately US$2.8 billion (projected combined annual revenue at formation)
- Date founded: 2026 (Ashurst Perkins Coie); 1822 (Ashurst); 1912 (Perkins Coie)
- Website: www.ashurstperkinscoie.com

Ashurst Perkins Coie is an international law firm formed in June 2026 through the combination of British law firm Ashurst and American law firm Perkins Coie. The combination brought together two independently established firms with significant practices in Europe, the Americas and the Asia-Pacific region.

At its formation, Ashurst Perkins Coie had 52 offices across 20 countries and regions, with more than 3,500 client-facing practitioners and over 950 partners. The firm maintains four flagship hubs in London, Seattle, Sydney and New York. Its principal areas of practice include corporate transactions, litigation, financial services, technology, energy and infrastructure.

The combination was estimated to generate approximately US$2.8 billion in annual revenue, placing the firm among the world's largest law firms by revenue.

== History ==
=== Predecessor firms ===
==== Ashurst ====
Ashurst was a British multinational law firm whose origins dated to 1822, when William Henry Ashurst established a legal practice in London. The firm subsequently operated under several names, including Ashurst Morris Crisp, before adopting the Ashurst name in 2003.

Ashurst developed an international practice specialising in corporate law, mergers and acquisitions, banking and finance, and commercial disputes. Its international expansion included a combination with Australian law firm Blake Dawson, one of Australia's former Big Six law firms.

In March 2012, Blake Dawson adopted the Ashurst name as part of a regional business combination. The firms completed their full financial merger on November 1, 2013, establishing a single international practice with a substantial presence in Australia, Europe, Asia and the Middle East.

==== Perkins Coie ====
Perkins Coie was an American multinational law firm founded in Seattle, Washington, in 1912 as Donworth and Todd. The firm developed through the expansion and consolidation of several legal practices. Its early clients included Boeing, which retained the firm in 1916.

Over the following century, Perkins Coie expanded beyond the Pacific Northwest into a multinational practice, with particular strengths in technology, intellectual property, corporate transactions, litigation and regulatory matters. Its clients included major technology companies, while its political law practice represented political campaigns, elected officials and other organisations.

In 2025, Perkins Coie successfully challenged an executive order issued by US President Donald Trump that imposed restrictions on the firm and its lawyers.

=== Formation of Ashurst Perkins Coie ===
On November 17, 2025, Ashurst and Perkins Coie announced an agreement to combine their operations under the name Ashurst Perkins Coie. The proposed transaction was described by the firms as a combination of equals, intended to bring together Ashurst's international transactional and financial services practices with Perkins Coie's American corporate, technology and litigation practices.

The proposed combination was part of a wider period of consolidation in the international legal services market, during which several major law firms pursued transatlantic mergers to expand their geographical reach and practice capabilities.

On April 13, 2026, the two firms announced that their respective partnerships had voted overwhelmingly to approve the combination. The proposed firm was expected to comprise approximately 3,000 lawyers across more than 50 offices, with combined annual revenue of approximately US$2.8 billion.

The combination was completed on June 29, 2026, with the merged firm commencing operations under the Ashurst Perkins Coie name.

Following completion, Paul Jenkins, previously Ashurst's global CEO, and Bill Malley, previously Perkins Coie's managing partner, became the combined firm's global co-CEOs. Karen Davies and Brian Eiting were appointed global co-chairs.

== Organisation and operations ==
Ashurst Perkins Coie operates internationally, with offices across North America, Europe, Asia, Australia, the Middle East and Africa. Its four flagship hubs are located in London, Seattle, Sydney and New York.

The firm provides legal services in corporate and commercial transactions, mergers and acquisitions, banking and finance, litigation, international arbitration, intellectual property, regulatory compliance and other areas of commercial law.

Its principal sector focuses include technology, energy and infrastructure, and financial services, reflecting the respective strengths of its predecessor firms.

== See also ==
- Ashurst LLP
- Perkins Coie
- List of largest law firms by revenue
