= Susan Neiman =

American philosopher, essayist, and cultural commentator (born 1955)

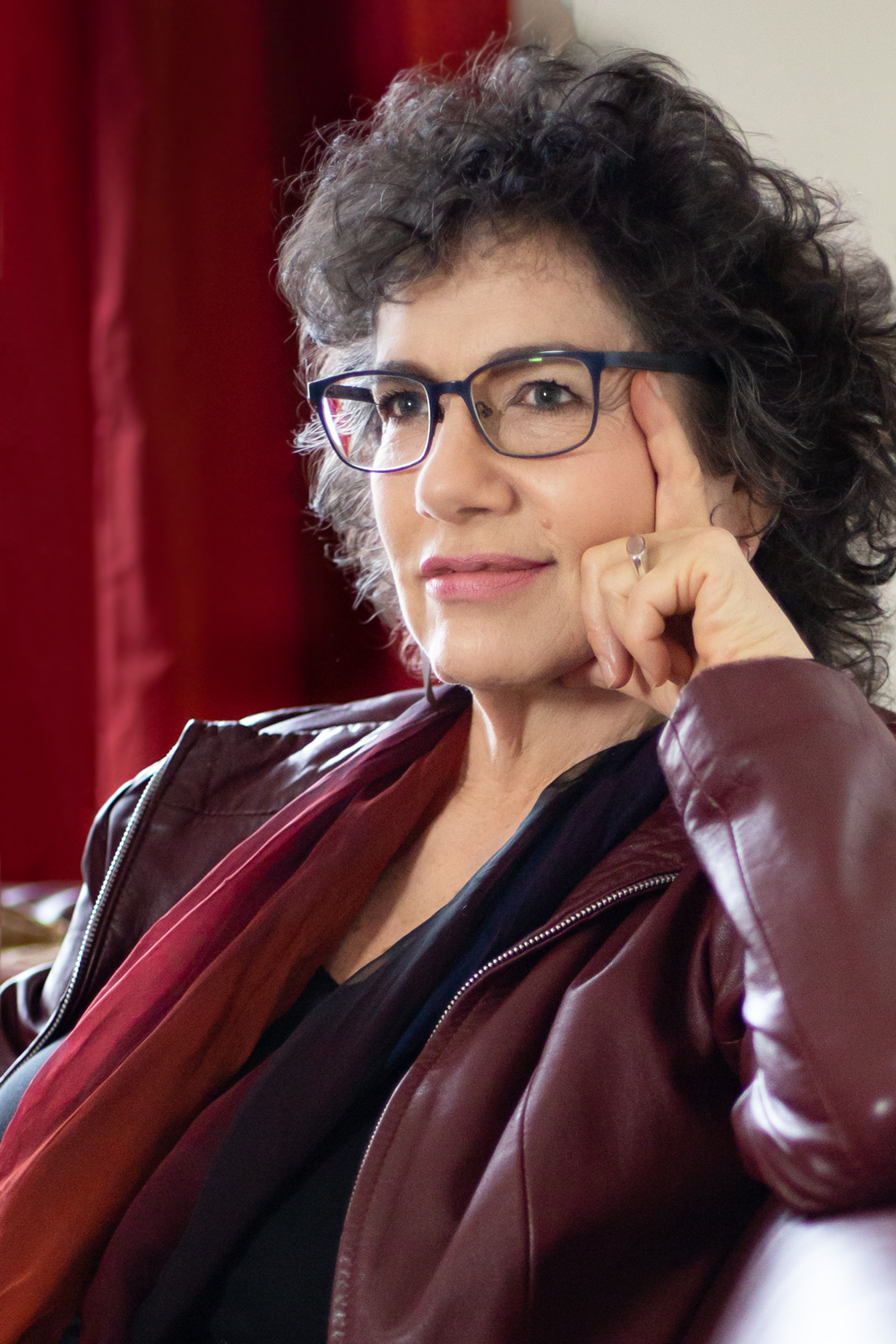
- Born: March 27, 1955 (age 71); Atlanta, Georgia, U.S.

Education
- Education: Harvard University
- Doctoral advisor: Stanley Cavell; John Rawls

Philosophical work
- Era: Contemporary philosophy
- Region: Western philosophy
- School: Analytic
- Institutions: Yale University; Tel Aviv University
- Main interests: Morality · History of philosophy · Political philosophy · Philosophy of religion
- Notable ideas: Criticism of woke politics from the left

Susan Neiman (/ˈnaɪmən/; born March 27, 1955) is an American moral philosopher, cultural commentator, and essayist. She has written extensively on the juncture between Enlightenment moral philosophy, metaphysics, and politics, both for scholarly audiences and the general public. She lives in Berlin.

== Early life and education ==
Born and raised in Atlanta, Georgia, Neiman dropped out of high school to join the anti-Vietnam War movement. Later, she studied philosophy at Harvard University, earning her Ph.D. under the direction of John Rawls and Stanley Cavell. During graduate school, she spent several years of study at the Free University of Berlin between 1982 and 1988.

== Career ==
From 1989 to 1996, Neiman was an assistant and associate professor of philosophy at Yale University, and from 1996 to 2000 she was an associate professor of philosophy at Tel Aviv University. From 2000 to 2026, she was Director of the Einstein Forum in Potsdam, Germany.

Neiman has been a Member of the Institute for Advanced Study in Princeton, New Jersey, a Research Fellow at the Rockefeller Foundation Study Center in Bellagio, and a Senior Fellow of the American Council of Learned Societies. She is currently a member of the Berlin-Brandenburg Academy of Sciences and Humanities and the American Philosophical Society. Her books have won prizes from PEN, the Association of American Publishers, and the American Academy of Religion. Her shorter pieces have appeared in The New York Review of Books, The New York Times, The Boston Globe, The Globe and Mail, and Dissent. In Germany, she has written for Die Zeit, Frankfurter Allgemeine Zeitung, and Freitag, among other publications.

== Major works ==
=== Evil in Modern Thought ===
Evil in Modern Thought writes the history of modern philosophy as a series of responses to the existence of evil – that which, whether in the form of innocent suffering or human action intentionally causing it, "threatens our sense of the sense of the world." Neiman argues that the problem of evil provides a better framework than epistemology for understanding the history of philosophy because it includes a wider range of texts, forms a link between metaphysics and ethics, and is more faithful to philosophers' stated concerns. Indeed, Neiman believes that evil, by challenging the intelligibility of the world as a whole, lies at the root of all philosophical inquiry.

The book explores the period from the early Enlightenment to the late 20th century through discussions of philosophers who often figure in traditional histories of philosophy, such as Leibniz, Kant, Hegel, Nietzsche, and Schopenhauer, as well ones who do not, such as Pierre Bayle, Sigmund Freud, Albert Camus, Emmanuel Levinas, and Hannah Arendt. Neiman groups thinkers around two basic distinctions: one between those who believe in a guiding order beyond appearances and those who think that sensory experience is all we have for orientation; and another between those who believe we must try to understand evil and those who maintain that doing so would be immoral on the grounds that any explanation of evil would be tantamount to its justification.

The book has been translated into more than ten languages and has received reviews in many outlets, including The New York Times, The New York Review of Books, the Times Literary Supplement, The Wall Street Journal, and The New Republic. The reviews were mostly positive. Jonathan Rée, writing for the TLS, called Neiman " not only a fine analyst but an acute stylist too, both scintillating and self-disciplined." In The Wall Street Journal, Damon Linker writes: "Life is lived – and tentative meaning is forged – in the border zone between sense and senselessness: That is the lesson of this profound and provocative book. It is a lesson worth pondering as we prepare to commemorate Sept. 11 and to revisit the question of why such horrors happen in the first place." Edward Rothstein, in The New York Times, was more ambivalent. Though he concedes that Neiman "eloquently outlines" the efforts of philosophers to account for evil, he finds her "condescending" in discussing those who called the 9/11 terrorist attacks "evil."

=== Moral Clarity ===
In Moral Clarity, Neiman argues that all human beings have moral needs but that secular culture, particularly on the political left, is reluctant or unable to satisfy or even articulate them, and as a consequence has ceded the moral domain to religion and traditional conservatives. She attributes this failing not to a lack of values but to a lack of a "standpoint from which those values make sense."The book explores the reasons why this is so and offers a framework for moral thinking based on Enlightenment ideas, particularly those of Kant and Rousseau, which rely neither on divine authority nor on authoritarian ideology.

In contrast to the Times' mixed appraisal of Evil in Modern Thought, its review of Moral Clarity was thoroughly positive: "Neiman’s particular skill lies in expressing sensitivity, intelligence and moral seriousness without any hint of oversimplification, dogmatism or misplaced piety. She clearly and unflinchingly sees life as it is, but also sees how it might be, and could be, if we recaptured some of the hopes and ideals that currently escape us." Jane O'Grady, for The Guardian, called the book "fresh and exhilarating, inspiring optimism rather than recrimination."

=== Why Grow Up? ===
In Why Grow Up, Neiman challenges the infantilism that she believes is widespread in modern society. She suggests that the "forces that shape our world" encourage consumerism, apathy, cynicism, and the fetishization of beauty and youth in order to keep citizens passive and compliant. She thinks these are propped up by a conception of adulthood in which being an adult is synonymous with drudgery, resignation, and inevitable decline. Neiman makes the case for an ideal of adulthood that involves exercising judgement, understanding one's own culture through immersion in others, actively shaping society, and seeking orientation in the face of uncertainty. As in Moral Clarity, Neiman draws on the work of Kant, Rousseau, Arendt, and other philosophers to argue for a concept of maturity in which thinking critically does not mean abandoning one's ideals.

Vivan Gornick, in Boston Review, is critical of the book's "prescriptiveness," which she argues does not help those who fail to "grow up." A. O. Scott calls the book "unusual and exemplary" if " sometimes frustrating," and concludes that its real virtue "lies in its insistence that thinking for oneself is a difficult and lifelong undertaking, in its genuinely subversive defense of philosophy in an age besotted by data."

=== Learning from the Germans ===
Her 2019 book Learning from the Germans examines German efforts to atone for Nazi atrocities and identifies lessons for how the U.S. might come to terms with its legacy of slavery and racism. The book brings together historical and philosophical analysis; interviews with politicians, activists, and contemporary witnesses in Germany and the United States; and Neiman's own first-person observations as a white woman growing up in the South and a Jewish woman who has lived for almost three decades in Berlin. After the book appeared, developments in Germany led Neiman to change some of her views.

=== Left Is Not Woke ===
In Left Is Not Woke, Neiman examines the assumptions behind "woke" politics and argues that they are at odds with what the left has always stood for: "universalism over tribalism, a firm distinction between justice and power, and a belief in the possibility of progress". She is particularly concerned that "tribalism" will undermine the left's political goals and leave it without the tools to oppose the far right, whose outlook has always been tribalist. Neiman traces woke thinking back to Michel Foucault, Carl Schmitt, and the thinkers they influenced, although she also finds similar views articulated by the character of Thrasymachus in Plato's Republic.

The book has been translated into German, Dutch, Spanish, Portuguese, French, Italian, Greek, Korean, Thai and other languages, and received many positive reviews, including in Dissent, The Chronicle of Higher Education, and The Political Quarterly. In his review for The New York Review of Books, the Irish journalist and essayist Fintan O'Toole writes, "Neiman’s short, punchy, and brilliantly articulated argument is essentially a call for those who regard themselves as being on the left to remember the distinction between skepticism and cynicism. The first is crucial to a progressive critique of untamed capitalism. It demands a constant critical awareness of how power and self-interest wrap themselves in virtue, 'common sense', and high ideals." The book has also received negative reviews. In the Los Angeles Review of Books, the historian Samuel Clowes Huneke characterized Left Is Not Woke as a "cringe-inducing screed against a group she terms 'the woke'—without ever telling us whom, exactly, she is talking about", and that is "chock full of ad hominem attacks and ungenerous readings".

=== Call It Evil: Understanding the Trump Era ===
In the 2026 book Call It Evil: Understanding the Trump Era, Neiman argues that the reelection of Donald Trump is the outcome not simply of political and economic forces but the erosion of values from constant messages undermining moral principles. Misreadings of Adam Smith and Charles Darwin have led to a view of human nature that now seems like common sense: ideals are for the naive, or for politicians who wish to deceive us. Neiman explores how this view, first formulated by pre-Socratic philosophers, has been promoted by corporate interests and pseudo-scientific arguments.

Library Journal, in a starred review, notes, "This is not a book about Donald Trump; it is about the conditions that have allowed him to prevail. Neiman has tackled the subject evil ... before ... but never as compellingly and comprehensively as here." Publishers' Weekly also awarded the book a star, describing it as "a clarifying reflection on the current moment's profound crisis of conscience." In her review for The New York Times, Jennifer Szalai calls the book "bracing" and "a polemical guide to the current moment" though she points out that the author does not wrestle with why some are shocked by extreme wrongs while others remain indifferent to them.

== Personal life ==
Susan Neiman is the mother of three adult children.

Slow Fire, a memoir about Neiman's life as a Jewish woman in 1980s Berlin, was published in 1992.

== Awards and honors ==
In 2014, Neiman was the recipient of an honorary doctorate from the University of St. Gallen. She delivered the Tanner Lectures on Human Values at the University of Michigan in 2010 and the Ashby Lecture at the University of Cambridge in 2022. She was the 2014 laureate of the International Spinoza Prize. In 2018, she was elected to the American Philosophical Society, and received the Lucius D. Clay Medal for her contributions to German-American relations. She served as the Gifford Lecturer for 2021–2022 at the University of Edinburgh. In 2021, she was awarded the August Bebel Prize of the German Social Democratic Party, and in 2023 she received the Order of Merit of Brandenburg. She was also a 2025 Thomas Mann Fellow and is a 2026–2027 visiting fellow at the Remarque Institute of New York University.

== Selected bibliography ==
=== Books ===
- Slow Fire: Jewish Notes from Berlin, Schocken, 1992.
- The Unity of Reason: Rereading Kant, Oxford University Press, 1994.
- Evil in Modern Thought: An Alternative History of Philosophy, Princeton University Press, 2002.
- Fremde sehen anders: Zur Lage der Bundesrepublik, Suhrkamp, 2005.
- Moral Clarity: A Guide for Grown-Up Idealists, Harcourt, 2008.
- Why Grow Up?, Penguin, 2014 (part of the series Philosophy in Transit). [Reprinted as Why Grow Up? Subversive Thoughts for an Infantile Age, Farrar, Straus & Giroux, 2015.]
- Widerstand der Vernunft: Ein Manifest in postfaktischen Zeiten, Ecowin, 2017.
- Learning from the Germans: Race and the Memory of Evil, Farrar, Straus and Giroux, 2019.
- Left Is Not Woke, Polity, 2023.
- Call It Evil: Understanding the Trump Era, Norton, 2026.

=== Selected articles and book chapters ===
- "Subversive Einstein," in Galison, Holton and Schweber, ed., Einstein for the 21st Century, Princeton University Press, 2008.
- "Victims and Heroes," in Matheson, ed., The Tanner Lectures on Human Values, University of Utah Press, 2012.
- "Forgetting Hiroshima, Remembering Auschwitz: Tales of Two Exhibits," Thesis Eleven, 129(1), 2015: 7–26.
- "Ideas of Reason," in Rangan, ed., Performance and Progress: Essays on Capitalism, Business, and Society, Oxford University Press, 2015.
- "Amerikanische Träume," in Honneth, Kemper, and Klein, ed., Bob Dylan, Suhrkamp, 2017.
- "A Dialogue Between Business and Philosophy" (with Bertrand Collomb) in Rangan, ed., Capitalism Beyond Mutuality? Perspectives Integrating Philosophy and Social Science, Oxford University Press, 2018.
- "Understanding the Problem of Evil" in Chignell, ed., Evil: Oxford Philosophical Concepts, Oxford University Press, 2019.
- “Corona as Chance: Overcoming the Tyranny of Self-Interest,” in Kahn and Maduro, eds., Democracy in Times of Pandemic, Cambridge University Press, 2020.
- "Longing for Reconciliation," The New York Review of Books, Apr. 4, 2023
- "Historical Reckoning Gone Haywire," The New York Review of Books, Oct. 23, 2023
- "Germany on Edge," The New York Review of Books, Nov. 3, 2023
- "Why the World Still Needs Immanuel Kant," The New York Times, Apr. 17, 2024
- "Fanon the Universalist," The New York Review of Books, Jun. 6, 2024
- "Why Trump Is Threatened by South Africa," The Nation, Mar. 14, 2025
- "The Conformist," The New York Review of Books, June 12, 2025
- "Where Wokeness Went Wrong," The New York Review of Books, Dec. 4, 2025
