= Thomas P. Sullivan =

American lawyer

Thomas P. Sullivan (23 March 1930–May 18, 2021) was a prominent Illinois attorney known for his involvement in notable constitutional cases, investigations, and contributions to public policy and law. He was a partner at the Jenner & Block law firm.

== Biography ==
In 1954, he joined the law firm of Jenner & Block, where he helped establish its pro bono program.

Sullivan was counsel on a case leading to a landmark 1968 U.S. Supreme Court decision, Witherspoon v. Illinois, prohibiting trial judges and prosecutors from using peremptory challenges to exclude potential jurors because of personal opposition to the death penalty. Over 350 inmates, including Witherspoon, had their death sentences reversed as a result. In 1971, he won a case before the Illinois Supreme Court, People v. McCabe, which held that the state's statutory classification of marijuana as a "hard drug" was unconstitutional.

From 1977 to 1981, Sullivan was the United States Attorney for the Northern District of Illinois under President Jimmy Carter. While U.S. Attorney, he initiated the Operation Greylord judicial sting operation.

In 2000, Illinois governor George Ryan appointed Sullivan to co-chair the Commission on Capital Punishment. The report included 85 recommendations for reform and helped persuade Ryan to commute all death sentences.

In 2003, Sullivan received the American Bar Association's John Minor Wisdom Award for his contributions to public service and the community. In 2004, he was named Chicago Lawyer magazine's Person of the Year. In 2007, he received The American Lawyer's Lifetime Achievement Award. He has written on numerous topics, e.g., the treatment of prisoners at Guantanamo Bay.

Sullivan attended Loras College and Loyola University Chicago School of Law, receiving a J.D. in 1952.

He died on May 18, 2021, aged 91.
