= Josh Hsu =

American attorney and political advisor (born 1979)

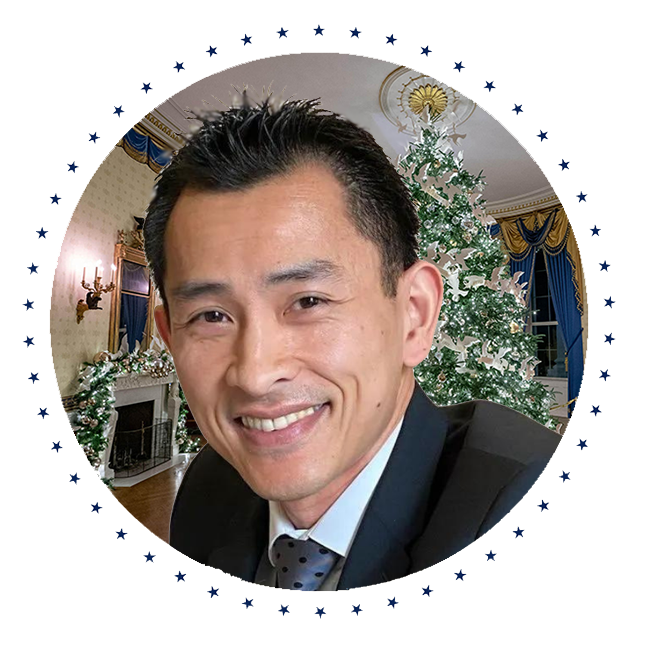

Counsel to the Vice President
- In office January 20, 2021 – January 5, 2023
- Vice President: Kamala D. Harris
- Preceded by: Gregory Jacob
- Succeeded by: Erica Songer

Personal details
- Born: 1979 (age 46–47) Rio de Janeiro, Brazil
- Party: Democratic
- Education: Georgetown University (BA, JD)

Josh M. Hsu (born 1979) is a Taiwanese American attorney and political advisor who served as special assistant to the president and counsel to Vice President Kamala Harris from January 2021 to January 2023. In August 2020, Hsu joined the presidential transition of Joe Biden as director of judicial nominations, and in 2024 joined the presidential transition of Kamala Harris.

== Early life and education ==
Born in Rio de Janeiro, Brazil, Hsu was raised by two immigrant Taiwanese parents who ran a jewelry wholesale business in New York City.

Hsu earned a Bachelor of Arts degree in economics and English from Georgetown University, where he graduated magna cum laude and was elected to Phi Beta Kappa. He received his Juris Doctor from the Georgetown University Law Center and was Order of the Coif. He served as a clerk for U.S. District Court Judge Denny Chin in the Southern District of New York.

== Career ==
Hsu began his legal career as an associate at O'Melveny & Myers and focused on complex class action litigation. After his clerkship with Judge Denny Chin, Hsu worked as a First Amendment legal fellow at the American Civil Liberties Union, where he worked on challenges to Connecticut's campaign finance law and represented clients in federal district court in matters involving suppression of speech. In 2008, Hsu joined the law firm of Paul, Weiss, Rifkind, Wharton & Garrison, where he continued to work on complex litigation matters in both federal and state courts.

In 2011, Hsu worked as counsel for the United States Senate Committee on the Judiciary and in the office of Ranking Member Patrick Leahy. In 2016, he was elevated to chief counsel for nominations, where he oversaw the judicial and executive branch nominees that appeared before the committee. Hsu served as lead counsel on legislative efforts to amend the Voting Rights Act after key provisions were struck down in Shelby County v. Holder.

In 2017, Hsu was named general counsel to then-Senator Kamala Harris, where he advised her on policy related to campaign finance, gun violence, voting, criminal justice reform, civil rights, law enforcement, and tech policy. In 2019, Hsu served as Harris's deputy chief of staff.

In September 2019, Hsu was named national policy director for Kamala Harris 2020 presidential campaign. In August 2020, Hsu became director of judicial nominations for the Biden–Harris Transition Team, where he advised and developed judicial nominations strategy for the Biden administration.

In November 2022, Hsu announced that he was leaving the Biden-Harris Administration at the end of the year. He left office on January 5, 2023 and will join Jenner & Block as a partner in its Government Controversies Practice.

In October 2024, Hsu was a member of the presidential transition of Kamala Harris, where he served as Executive Director and managed the day-to-day operations of the organization, while building out a team and infrastructure for a potential presidential transition. He returned to Jenner as a partner in January 2025. In October 2025 he joined the mental health AI company Slingshot AI as General Counsel.

== Awards ==
In 2015, Hsu was recognized as one of the National Asian Pacific American Bar Association's (NAPABA) Best Lawyers Under 40.
