= Brad S. Karp =

American lawyer (born 1959)

Brad Karp
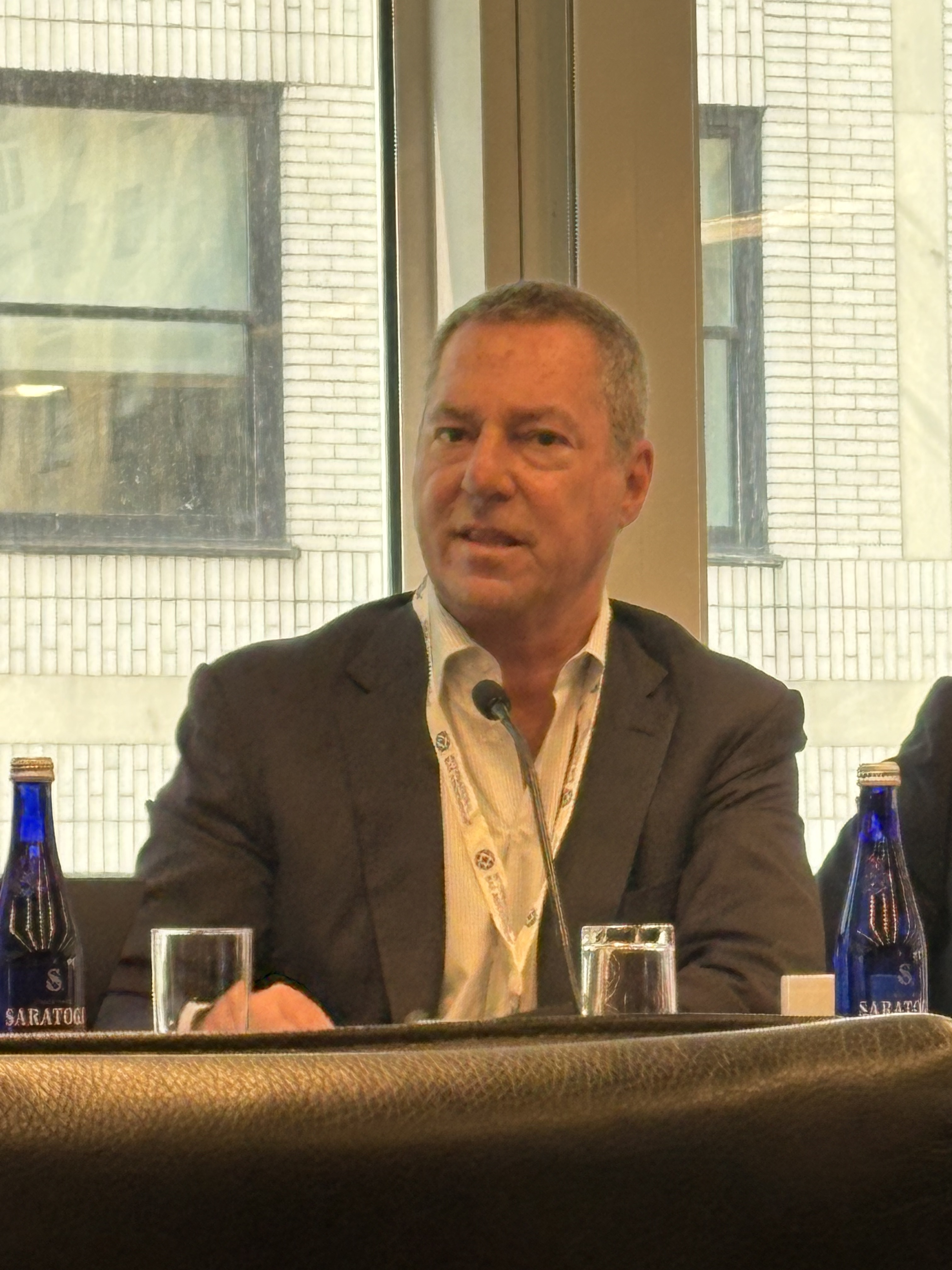
- Karp in 2025
- Born: July 25, 1959 (age 67); Merrick, New York, U.S.
- Education: Union College (BA); Harvard University (JD)
- Organization: Paul, Weiss, Rifkind, Wharton & Garrison
- Spouse: Roberta Schuhalter
- Children: 2

Brad Scott Karp (born July 25, 1959) is an American lawyer and a litigation partner at Paul, Weiss, Rifkind, Wharton & Garrison. He was the chairman of Paul, Weiss from 2008 until his resignation in 2026, after his ties with child sex offender Jeffrey Epstein were revealed.

Karp is also a bundler for Democratic Party presidential candidates in the United States, having raised sums for the presidential campaigns of Kamala Harris, Cory Booker, Joe Biden, Amy Klobuchar, and others. In 2025, Karp quickly settled with the second Donald Trump administration when Trump made threats against law firms perceived to be associated with his political opponents.

In January 2026, newly unsealed documents showed that Karp was a frequent correspondent of Jeffrey Epstein. He stepped down from his position as chairman of Paul, Weiss on February 4, 2026, after the correspondence with Epstein became public.

== Early life and education ==
Karp was raised on Long Island. He graduated with a B.A. in political science from Union College and a J.D. from Harvard Law School in 1984. Aside from a clerkship under Judge Irving R. Kaufman at the United States Court of Appeals for the Second Circuit, Karp has worked continuously at Paul, Weiss since he began as a summer associate.

== Career ==
Karp was named chairman of Paul, Weiss in 2008 and served in the role until 2026. Prior to his election, he co-chaired the firm's litigation department.

Karp has represented a wide range of clients in his career, including many financial services firms. His clients include JPMorgan Chase, Wachovia, Morgan Stanley, Apollo Global Management, Merrill Lynch, Deloitte, MacAndrews & Forbes, ING, Bear Stearns, Ericsson, Hexion, Scottish Power and Eton Park in securities, commercial and regulatory matters.

Karp serves as a director of the Legal Action Center, a non-profit law and policy organization in the U.S. whose mission is to fight discrimination against people with histories of addiction, HIV/AIDS, or criminal records.

Karp will be featured as one of eight business and political leaders profiled in the book, Profiles in Cowardice, written by journalist Jacob Weisberg, to be published in September 2026.

=== Negotiation with Second Trump Administration ===
In March 2025, President Donald Trump issued executive orders aimed at Paul Weiss and two other law firms. Those orders targeted firms that employed attorneys who participated in legal actions and investigations against Trump. Trump's stated goal was to identify and root out law firms that engaged in anti-government activities.

Paul Weiss decided to negotiate. Karp, as head of the firm, flew to Washington and met with the Office of the President and the chairman of Sullivan & Cromwell. The Administration and Karp entered into an agreement with five terms:

Today, President Donald J. Trump agreed to withdraw his March 14, 2025 Executive Order regarding the Paul, Weiss, Rifkind, Wharton & Garrison LLP law firm (*Paul, Weiss*), which has entered into the following agreement with the President:

1. Paul, Weiss agrees that the bedrock principle of American justice is that it must be fair and nonpartisan for all. Our justice system is betrayed when it is misused to achieve political ends. Lawyers and law firms play a vital role in ensuring that we live up to that standard as a Nation. Law firms should not favor any political party when it comes to choosing their clients. Nor should firms make decisions on whom to hire based on a person's political affiliation. To do otherwise is to deny some Americans an equal opportunity for our services while favoring others. Lawyers abandon the profession's highest ideals when they engage in partisan decisionmaking and betray the ethical obligation to represent those who are unpopular or disfavored in a particular moment.

2. Paul, Weiss affirms its unwavering commitment to these core ideals and principles and will not deny representation to clients, including in pro bono matters and in support of non-profits, because of the personal political views of individual lawyers.

3. Paul, Weiss will take on a wide range of pro bono matters that represent the full spectrum of political viewpoints of our society, whether "conservative" or "liberal."

4. Paul, Weiss affirms its commitment to merits-based hiring, promotion, and retention. As part of its commitment, it will engage experts, to be mutually agreed upon within 14 days, to conduct a comprehensive audit of all of its employment practices.

5. Paul, Weiss will dedicate the equivalent of $40 million in pro bono legal services over the course of President Trump's term to support these initiatives: assisting our Nation's veterans, fairness in our justice system, the President's Task Force to Combat Antisemitism, and other mutually agreed projects.

In response to the President's announcement, Paul, Weiss's Chairman Brad Karp said, "We are gratified that the President has agreed to withdraw the Executive Order concerning Paul, Weiss. We look forward to an engaged and constructive relationship with the President and his Administration."

Paul, Weiss was clear that these terms were a reaffirmation of principles already held by the firm. President Trump posted a differing term sheet on Truth Social, stating that Karp agreed that Paul Weiss would discontinue all hiring practices that involve diversity, equity, and inclusion and provide $40 million in pro bono activities to Trump-supported initiatives. It was also reported that Karp condemned the actions of former Paul, Weiss partner Mark Pomerantz. Neither of these items appear in the official term sheet, and neither are verifiable.

Trump, subsequently, rescinded the order targeting the law firm.

The agreement sparked outrage and raised questions about the firm's independence and integrity. This incident was seen as a capitulation by Karp and Paul Weiss to Trump's demands, and has tarnished the reputation of the law firm. Conservative lawyer George Conway criticized the decision, calling it “the most disgraceful action by a major law firm in my lifetime, so appalling that I couldn’t believe it at first.” Three other firms (Perkins Coie, Covington & Burling, and Jenner & Block) are fighting similar attacks by Trump. Perkins Coie successfully enjoined the executive order against them, but as a result of the controversy has been outspoken about its loss of business.

The decision for Karp to negotiate with the President's Administration was backed by the majority of the firm's partners, and Karp has stated that the firm was facing an "existential crisis" and would not have survived without making the deal with Trump. Although the firm did have over $2 billion in receivables in 2024 (with an average equity partner profit per partner of $7.5 million), that average partner income might have decreased significantly even if the firm had been successful in defending itself. More than simply lower profit shares, Paul, Weiss is one of the first major law firms to publicly announce that the firm, which employs roughly 2,500 individuals, would have shuttered in the wake of fighting Trump's executive order.

=== Association with Jeffrey Epstein and resignation ===
In January 2026, newly unsealed documents showed that Karp had corresponded by email with Jeffrey Epstein on personal matters. One such correspondence involved Karp asking on behalf of his son, a filmmaker, for an opportunity to work with Woody Allen. He wrote to Epstein in 2015, "I can't thank you enough for including me in an evening I'll never forget... It was truly 'once in a lifetime' in every way, though I hope to be invited again", and praised Epstein in an email, saying, "you're amazing." Karp also reportedly attended "dinner gatherings" at Epstein's home.

Paul, Weiss stated that Karp did not have a professional relationship with Epstein and that neither Karp nor the firm represented Epstein as a client. The firm said it had been retained by Leon Black and Apollo Global Management to negotiate fee disputes with Epstein and that its role was adverse to Epstein's interests. Karp also corresponded with Epstein as part of an attempt to surveil an unspecified woman and have her deported.

On February 4, 2026, Karp resigned from his chairmanship at Paul, Weiss after his connection with Epstein was made public. He remains a partner in the litigation department at Paul, Weiss.

=== Congressional Oversight ===
On November 4, 2026 Democratic incoming chairman of the U.S. House Judiciary Committee Jamie Raskin (D-MD) announced he would subpoena Paul, Weiss and other law firms who made “outrageous concessions” to the Trump Administration.

== Awards ==
Under Karp's leadership, Paul, Weiss has won numerous awards for legal accomplishments, including receiving the New York Law Journal's first Impact Award in 2013, for "innovations to the partnership model … outstanding representation of clients during the financial crisis … and commitment to public service that has boosted the firms' pro bono hours." In 2012, his firm was named by Financial Times as among the 25 firms that are "agents for change," placing 9th.
