= Perkins Coie =

Former International law firm based in Seattle, Washington

Perkins Coie LLP
- Headquarters: 1201 Third Avenue; Seattle, Washington, United States
- No. of offices: 21
- No. of attorneys: 1,000+
- Major practice areas: General practice
- Key people: Bill Malley (managing partner)
- Revenue: US$1.26 billion (2024)
- Date founded: 1912 (Seattle)
- Company type: Limited liability partnership
- Dissolved: June 2026
- Website: perkinscoie.com

Perkins Coie LLP (/ˈkuːiː/ KOO-ee) was an American law firm based in Seattle, Washington. Founded in 1912, it was the largest law firm headquartered in the Pacific Northwest, with 21 offices across the United States, Europe, and Asia. The firm provides corporate, commercial litigation, intellectual property, and regulatory legal advice to a broad range of clients, including prominent technology companies such as Google, Microsoft, Intel, Meta, and Amazon.

The firm was also known for its pro bono work, and for successfully suing to block an Executive Order targeting the firm.

In April 2026, the law partners of Perkins Coie and Ashurst LLP voted to merge firms and form Ashurst Perkins Coie, with the merger having been completed in June 2026.

== History ==
Perkins Coie was founded in 1912 as Donworth and Todd. The firm evolved into its present day firm through the merger of several law practices. Early founding partners included George Donworth and Elmer Todd, Hollister T. Sprague, Frank E. Holman, DeForrest Perkins and J. Paul Coie.

The firm secured Boeing Company as a client in 1916.

In 2024, Perkins Coie's pro bono team successfully secured a grant of asylum for a former Afghan Air Force pilot.

The firm was an early representative of fintech and blockchain interests and has one of the largest law firm blockchain and digital currency practices. Perkins Coie also counsels startups and established tech companies. It launched the Perkins Coie Tech Venture index in 2019, which measures the overall health and trajectory of the emerging growth technology and venture capital ecosystem.

In 2018, Perkins Coie joined the American Bar Association's campaign targeting substance-use disorders and mental health issues among lawyers.

In 2019, the firm became a signatory to the Mansfield Rule, which aims to diversify the leadership of large law firms by broadening the candidate pool for senior management positions.

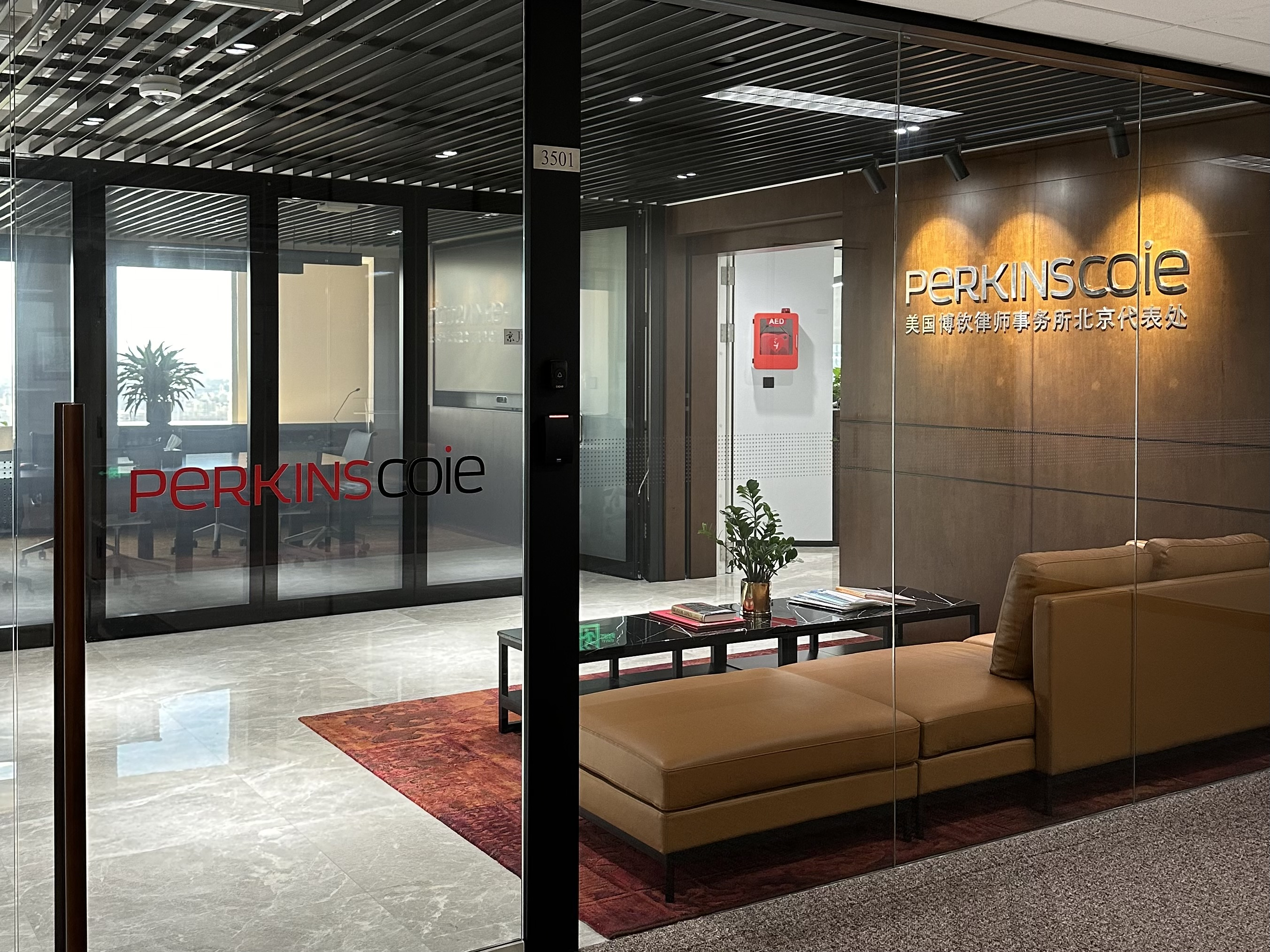
Perkins Coie Beijing Office in September 2024

In March 2024, Perkins Coie announced the closure of its office in Shanghai, China. Later in September, the firm confirmed that it had commenced the process of closing its Beijing office and would shift its strategic focus in China to Shenzhen. However, days later, Loeb & Loeb announced that it would acquire Perkins Coie's IP firm, which was established in 2019 in Shenzhen, as well as Perkins Coie's Beijing team of 17 lawyers.

In May 2024, the firm announced the launch of a London office with a technology-focused corporate practice. The London office was led by corporate lawyer Ian Bagshaw.

In September 2025, the firm fired a lawyer over a social media post that criticized Charlie Kirk.

In November 2025, Perkins Coie and Ashurst LLP announced a merger to form Ashurst Perkins Coie. The following April, the partners of both firms voted in support of the merger.

== Political Law Practice ==
Perkins Coie's Political Law Practice was founded by attorney Bob Bauer in 1980. The practice's clients primarily include major corporations, Democratic candidates and elected officials, and other left leaning organizations.

For the 2016 United States presidential election, the practice successfully brought several lawsuits against what they asserted were restrictive state voting laws that unduly targeted minority voters. These efforts were funded by the Democratic Party as well as $5 million provided by billionaire George Soros. The practice received criticism from some civil rights groups because the firm brought lawsuits primarily in jurisdictions that would help the Democratic Party. The NAACP, for example, felt that the battle for voting rights might then be "dismissed as partisan".

The Political Law Practice, led by attorney Marc Elias at the time, was hired in 2015 as counsel for the presidential campaign of Hillary Clinton. During the campaign, the Clinton campaign and the Democratic National Committee (DNC) paid Perkins Coie $5.6 million and $3.6 million respectively. Later, the DNC and Clinton campaign treasurers reported they paid Perkins Coie a total of $12.4 million for legal and compliance services during the 2016 campaign.

As part of its representation of the Clinton campaign and the DNC, Perkins Coie retained the intelligence firm Fusion GPS for opposition research services. Those services began in April 2016 and concluded before the 2016 U.S. presidential election in early November. According to Fusion GPS, Perkins Coie paid them $1.02 million in fees and expenses for those services. Fusion GPS later hired Christopher Steele and his Orbis Business Intelligence, paying them $168,000 to produce the Steele dossier. Although Perkins Coie did not hire Steele or Orbis, it indirectly funded the dossier, described by BBC correspondent Paul Wood as the "first to warn that Russia was mounting a covert operation to elect Donald Trump". It described attempts by Russia to promote the presidential campaign of Donald Trump.

On October 24, 2017, Perkins Coie released Fusion GPS from its client confidentiality obligation. The FEC conducted an investigation into misreported 2016 payments to Perkins Coie and levied a fine of more than $100,000, jointly paid by the DNC and the Clinton campaign.

Following the 2020 presidential election, the Political Law Practice handled the responses to dozens of lawsuits filed by the Donald Trump campaign, in which Trump sought to overturn Joe Biden's win. Out of 65 such court cases, Perkins Coie prevailed in 64. The firm was said to have billed the DNC and Biden campaign over $20 million during the election.

In 2021, as several Republican-dominated state legislatures passed laws to tighten election procedures and impose stricter voting requirements, Perkins Coie filed suits challenging the new laws, often within hours of the bills being signed.

In 2021, Marc Elias, 13 other partners, and 36 associates left the Political Law Practice to form the Elias Law Group. One of the reasons for the split with Perkins Coie was that representing the Democratic Party was causing conflicts of interest with Perkins Coie's other corporate clients.

Perkins Coie's Political Law Practice focuses on providing political law advice to corporate clients and Democratic candidates for state and federal office. In 2023, the DNC parted ways with the Elias Law Group over strategy disputes. The DNC returned to Perkins Coie and paid the law firm nearly $10 million during the 2024 U.S. Presidential Election.

== Notable clients and cases ==
Perkins Coie advises many companies, including some of the world's largest technology companies, such as, Google, Amazon, and Microsoft, as well as large corporations such as Boeing, Costco, and Starbucks. In 2025, clients also include Intel and the Seattle Seahawks.

The firm represented Amazon in its IPO in 1997.

In 2004, Perkins Coie led Christine Gregoire's successful recount effort in the 2004 Washington gubernatorial election.

In 2006, the firm, led by partner Harry Schneider, represented Salim Ahmed Hamdan, the alleged driver and bodyguard of Osama bin Laden. The case was heard at the U.S. Supreme Court in Hamdan v. Rumsfeld, in which the Court ruled that the Bush Administration's use of military commissions to try terrorism suspects was unconstitutional.

Perkins successfully represented Al Franken in his recount and legal battle over the 2008 Senatorial election in Minnesota.

The firm represented Washington Families Standing Together in Doe v. Reed in its attempt to disqualify 2009 Washington Referendum 71 from appearing on the ballot that November, by challenging petition signatures in the state's ballot initiative campaigns. While argued successfully before the U.S. Supreme Court on April 28, 2010, the court declined to bar the referendum from appearing on the ballot.

In 2010, Perkins Coie sought advisory opinions from the Federal Election Commission (FEC) declaring that certain Google and Facebook advertisements were covered by the "small items" and "impracticable" exemptions of the law that otherwise requires a political advertisement to include a disclaimer revealing who paid for it. The commission granted Google's request in a divided vote and deadlocked on Facebook's request.

In October 2017, the firm lobbied against the Honest Ads Act, a bill that would require internet companies to disclose who paid for political advertisements.

The firm was retained to conduct the independent investigation into potential sexual abuse by Richard Strauss during his employment with Ohio State University (OSU) wrestling program. The firm conducted 600 interviews with 520 subjects over a year,funded by OSU, and expected to cost more than $6.2 million. Of 177 students who personally confirmed abuse by the doctor — and 38 more who confirmed abuse but could not remember which staff person was the perpetrator, according to the university's investigation — 48 were from the wrestling program. Since the report did not specifically mention the failure to address the abuse, or the lack of same, on the part of Republican Congressman Jim Jordan (who had coached in the programs for eight years alongside Strauss), Jordan claimed that to have been exonerated by the investigation.

In 2022, the firm advised YouTube TV, in its Sunday Ticket broadcast agreement with the NFL.

In 2023, the firm advised Microsoft on its growing partnership with OpenAI, and represented Amazon in patent litigation before the International Trade Commission.

== Targeting by Donald Trump ==
On March 6, 2025, President Donald Trump signed executive order 14230 that barred the federal government from using Perkins Coie's services, suspended the security clearances of attorneys working for the firm, barred attorneys of the firm from entering federal office buildings, and ordered departmental reviews with the intention of ending government contracts with the clients of Perkins Coie. The order accuses Perkins Coie of "dishonest and dangerous activity". It also accused the firm of racial discrimination, as part of the Trump administration's campaign against diversity, equity and inclusion measures.

The order was part of a larger campaign by the Trump administration to punish law firms that had worked for his political opponents. A similar order, executive order 14237, signed on March 14, targeted law firm Paul, Weiss, Rifkind, Wharton & Garrison (known as "Paul, Weiss"); however this order was rescinded a week later after Paul, Weiss committed to reforms. According to The Washington Post, "the move could have a chilling effect on law firms’ willingness to take on clients and cases that run counter to the Trump administration, challenging a fundamental tenet of the rule of law in the United States that everyone should have access to legal representation."

The executive order raised concerns regarding Perkins Coie's First Amendment rights to freedom of speech, as it targets the firm based on the clients they represent; critics have argued that this represents an unconstitutional form of viewpoint discrimination. Further concerns have been raised that the order violates the right to due process granted by the Fifth Amendment, as Perkins Coie had not been given notice of governmental actions against it, nor had it been given a chance to respond prior to the implementation of the order. Some have argued that it also violates the right to counsel granted by the Sixth Amendment.

A spokesperson for Perkins Coie has said the order "is patently unlawful, and we intend to challenge it". On March 10, 2025, Perkins Coie retained Williams & Connolly, a firm known for its aggressive approach to suits against the federal government, in response to the executive order. Perkins Coie's decision to challenge the order, along with Williams & Connolly's decision to accept the case, were viewed as notable exceptions from the larger legal industry's relative unwillingness to publicly confront the administration.

They filed suit in the US District Court for the District of Columbia the next day, and the case was assigned to Judge Beryl Howell, who entered a temporary restraining order that blocked most of the provisions of Trump's executive order. She said that Trump's action "sends little chills down my spine". The Trump administration moved to have Howell disqualified from the case, alleging that she had "repeatedly demonstrated partiality against and animus towards the president", but their motion was denied by Howell.

507 law firms signed an amicus brief, on April 4, 2025, in support of Perkins Coie's motion for a permanent injunction of the March 6, 2025 Executive Order, as violating the First, Fifth, and Sixth Amendments of the U.S. Constitution.

On May 2, 2025, Judge Howell ruled that the executive order violated the First, Fifth, and Sixth Amendments to the Constitution, and permanently blocked the administration from enforcing it.

== Diversity Fellowship Program ==
In 1991, Perkins Coie instituted a Diversity Fellowship Program. The program was open to Black, Hispanic, Native American or LGBT law students. Those that were admitted were given a stipend and an internship at the law firm. Internships often lead to employment. The program was design to help recruit people of color which major law firms have had difficulty in adding to the ranks of their partners.

In October 2023, the firm removed the language specifying that the program was only open people of a certain race, sexual orientation or gender identity. The program was then open to all law students. Applicants are asked to write about their life experiences and are evaluated based on their "efforts to advance diversity, equity and inclusion". Perkins Coie made this change in response to a lawsuit brought by a group led by affirmative action opponent Edward Blum. In response to the changes, Blum's group dropped the lawsuit.

== Recognition ==
Perkins Coie has been recognized by The American Lawyer as being one of the top 50 firms in the U.S., and has been named one of Fortune's "100 Best Companies to Work For", for 22 consecutive years.

The American Lawyer jointly named Perkins Coie Law Firm of the Year in 2025, among eight firms, four of which were honored for successful challenges to executive orders, and four others for legal representations of those firms.

== Notable alumni ==
- Cyrus Habib, 16th Lieutenant Governor of Washington
- Rob McKenna, former Attorney General of Washington State
- Margaret McKeown, judge of the 9th Circuit Court of Appeals
- Ronald M. Gould, judge of the 9th Circuit Court of Appeals
- Eric D. Miller, judge of the 9th Circuit Court of Appeals
- Tiffany Cunningham, judge of the Federal Circuit Court of Appeals
- Chris Garrett, Oregon Supreme Court Justice
- Dan Sullivan, U.S. Senator
- Michael Sussmann, cybersecurity lawyer, indicted by the Durham special counsel investigation for allegedly making a false statement to the FBI in September 2016. Sussmann resigned following charging by the special counsel; a jury trial unanimously acquitted him in May 2022
- Colin Allred, U.S. Representative
- Rick White, U.S. Representative
- Ellen Weintraub, former FEC chair
