= Peter Koski =

American lawyer

Peter M. Koski is a partner at the Washington, D.C. firm Covington (formerly Covington & Burling). He was formerly a trial attorney for the United States Department of Justice. On June 22, 2010, he was responsible for the indictment of Puerto Rico Senator Héctor Martínez on corruption charges. On February 25, 2025, his security clearances were suspended by President Donald Trump.

== Education ==
He received a B.A. summa cum laude at Seattle University.

In 2005, he graduated from Stanford Law School, where he obtained his Juris Doctor. He delivered the student speech at the commencement exercises after having been co-president of his graduating class. While a student, he spent nearly two months in Gujarat, India, documenting caste discrimination cases. At Stanford Law School's Center on Conflict and Negotiation, he served as a Fellow.

== Professional experience ==
Before attending Stanford, he served as a Rotary Ambassadorial Fellow in Ecuador.

Before joining the United States Department of Justice's Criminal Division's Public Integrity Section, Koski worked as a law clerk to U.S. Court of Appeals for the Ninth Circuit Judge Richard C. Tallman.

In addition to the indictment of the now convicted Puerto Rican senator, he has also been assigned to other high-profile public integrity cases, including the now closed investigation into allegations regarding former United States Department of Housing and Urban Development Secretary Alphonso Jackson.
