= Jeannie Rhee =

American lawyer (born 1972)

Jeannie Hae Rhee (born July 25, 1972) is an American lawyer who served as a Deputy Assistant Attorney General during the Obama administration. In 2017, she was appointed by special counsel Robert Mueller to join the 2017 special counsel team to investigate Russia's intervention into the 2016 U.S. presidential election.

== Early life and family ==
Rhee's parents grew up in Korea and they immigrated to the United States early on in her childhood having minimal knowledge of English language or culture. She received exceptional marks throughout high school and was named valedictorian at Gateway High School outside Pittsburgh, attended the Pennsylvania state championships for varsity debate, and was accepted early to Yale University where she was a member of the prestigious Scroll and Key Secret Society. Rhee's husband, Christopher Sclafani Rhee, formerly Christopher Sclafani, served as an Assistant U.S. Attorney for the District of Columbia, and later on, as a partner at Arnold and Porter law firm. Jeannie and Chris are currently living in Washington D.C., with their two children.

== Education ==
Rhee graduated summa cum laude with a bachelor's degree from Yale University. Rhee received her Juris Doctor (JD) from Yale Law School.

== Career ==
In 2000, Rhee served as an Assistant United States Attorney for the District of Columbia. In 2006, Rhee joined Wilmer Hale. From 2009 to 2011, Rhee served as a deputy assistant attorney general and provided counsel to the former Attorney General Eric Holder. Rhee rejoined Wilmer Hale in 2011 as a partner in the Litigation/Controversy Department. Upon receiving the special counsel appointment from Mueller in 2017, Rhee resigned from the WilmerHale law firm and joined Mueller's special counsel team.

Previously, Rhee represented Hillary Clinton during the 2015 lawsuit regarding her private emails. Rhee also represented ex-Obama National Security Adviser Ben Rhodes and the Clinton Foundation in a 2015 racketeering case.

In 2019, Rhee joined Paul, Weiss, Rifkind, Wharton & Garrison as a partner in their Washington litigation practice. In 2025, Rhee was targeted along with her firm by Donald Trump in his administration's retaliatory campaign against attorneys investigating or prosecuting allegations and/or conspiracies involving the president.
