= Paul, Weiss, Rifkind, Wharton & Garrison =

American law firm

Paul, Weiss, Rifkind, Wharton & Garrison LLP
- Headquarters: 1285 Sixth Avenue; New York City
- No. of offices: 11
- No. of attorneys: 1,226
- Major practice areas: Litigation, corporate law
- Key people: Scott Barshay (chairman)
- Revenue: US$2.6 billion (2024)
- Profit per equity partner: US$7.5 million (2024)
- Date founded: Predecessor firm founded in April 1875
- Company type: Limited liability partnership
- Website: paulweiss.com

Paul, Weiss, Rifkind, Wharton & Garrison LLP (known as Paul, Weiss) (Note: Some publications omit the comma.) is an American multinational white-shoe law firm headquartered in New York City.

The firm historically focused on litigation, but shifted towards corporate law after Brad Karp became chairman in 2008. The firm has offices in Washington, D.C., San Francisco, Los Angeles, Wilmington, Houston, Toronto, London, Brussels, Tokyo, and Hong Kong.

== History ==
=== Founding (1875–1949) ===
The firm that eventually became Paul, Weiss, Rifkind, Wharton & Garrison was started in New York in 1875 by Samuel William Weiss and Julius Frank as a general commercial practice. In 1923, Samuel's son, Louis Weiss, started his own firm with John F. Wharton. That firm later merged with Samuel's firm, becoming Cohen, Cole, Weiss & Wharton. In the 1930s, the firm represented one of the Scottsboro boys. In 1946, Lloyd K. Garrison and Randolph Paul joined the firm, bringing the firm up to thirteen lawyers. The name changed to Paul, Weiss, Wharton & Garrison.

==== Corporate law expansion ====
In the early 2010s, chair Brad Karp decided that Paul, Weiss needed to increase its exposure to the private equity industry so as to boost revenue. Apollo Global Management then became the most important firm client, paying more than $200 million annually in legal fees. Paul, Weiss revenue subsequently rose from less than $700 million in 2009 to more than $3 billion in 2025, while Karp became one of the highest-paid lawyers in the world. Its importance to the firm also led Karp to entangle himself in the personal affairs of Apollo's CEO and co-founder, Leon Black, and his representative, Jeffrey Epstein. Scott Barshay was recruited to lead and expand the mergers and acquisitions department in 2016.

==== Diversity ====
In 1946, Paul, Weiss became the first major New York law firm to have a female partner, Carolyn Agger. William Thaddeus Coleman Jr. was the first black lawyer hired at the firm. When he was hired in 1949, it was the first time ever that a major New York City law firm hired a person of color as an associate.

On October 10, 2007, Paul, Weiss was included in a ranking of Manhattan law firms by the national law student group Building a Better Legal Profession. The organization ranked firms by billable hours, demographic diversity, and pro bono participation. For diversity among partner attorneys, the firm was ranked in the 61st to 80th percentile for Black, Hispanic, Asian, and LGBT categories. Paul, Weiss was also ranked number 52 out of the 74 firms evaluated, for opportunities for advancement for female attorneys. In 2019, the nonprofit group Lawyers of Color reported that Paul, Weiss had the highest percentage of black lawyers of the 400 firms it ranked. In 2020, women comprised 26% of Paul, Weiss' partnership, all equity partners. This is slightly higher than the average for law firms (23.6% as reported by the National Association for Law Placement).

In 2018, the firm was criticized when it released a photograph on its LinkedIn of recently promoted partners, all of whom were white. The photograph also included only one woman. Although Paul, Weiss had a reputation for being more diverse than other elite big-law firms, the announcement drew criticisms that even "diverse" big-law firms still partook in racist and sexist methods of employment and promotion. The photograph served as a "lightning rod" for the growing frustration that elite law careers are still largely reserved for white men.

Loretta Lynch, the first black woman to serve as United States attorney general, joined Paul, Weiss in 2019 as a litigation partner.

In 2020, Paul, Weiss said it wanted to join law firms and public-interest organizations across the U.S. in a pro bono effort to root out racism.

In 2023, the firm made a $3.5 million deal with its first openly transgender partner, Lex Korberg, with whom Barshay clashed, in exchange for their agreement to not disparage or sue Paul, Weiss.

==== Representation of fossil fuel corporations ====
Paul, Weiss has represented Exxon Mobil for over a decade in its attempts to dismiss U.S. cities' and states' cases seeking compensation for climate change harms. In 2025, the Supreme Court rejected Paul, Weiss' bid to throw out Honolulu's case before trial. Top-paid partners at Paul, Weiss – such as Theodore V. Wells, Jr. – tout this work battling climate change cases for Exxon. A 2021 assessment singled out Paul, Weiss among law firms as engaging in the most litigation, lobbying, and transactional work for fossil fuel companies, garnering many millions. The company received the lowest grade in a 2021 scorecard of law firms on climate change actions. The firm had represented fossil fuel companies in 30 cases over the five preceding years. In January and February 2020, students at Harvard Law School, Yale Law School, New York University School of Law, and the University of Michigan Law School protested the firm's recruitment events over its representation of Exxon Mobil Corporation.

In 2023, Paul, Weiss defended ExxonMobil in a long-running human rights abuse case involving the company's hiring of soldiers in Indonesia who allegedly committed murder and torture while working for Exxon. Indonesian villagers alleged that soldiers contracted by ExxonMobil committed sexual assault on pregnant women and electrically shocked and inflicted graffiti by knives on villagers' backs. In commenting on the case, Columbia law school lecturer Michael Paradis stated, "Exxon and its lawyers threw everything they could at them, and they overcame it." After Judge Lamberth ordered Exxon to pay around $289,000 in sanctions after finding that Alex Oh (while a partner at Paul, Weiss and enforcement director of the U.S. Securities and Exchange Commission) behaved improperly to opposing counsel during the case, Oh resigned as Securities and Exchange enforcement director.

==== Israel–Palestine conflict ====
In November 2023, amid a wave of pro-Palestine protests on law school campuses, Paul, Weiss was among a group of major law firms who signed a joint letter to elite law school deans, urging them to not allow "antisemitic speech" on campus, including "criticism of the state of Israel."

==== EO 14237 and pro bono deal with Second Trump administration ====
In 2025, as part of a retaliatory campaign by U.S. president Donald Trump against law firms who had represented political opponents of his, the firm (along with Perkins Coie) was targeted by the Second Donald Trump administration. Executive order 14237 prohibited Paul, Weiss employees from entering government buildings, working for the government, or having security clearances, citing its diversity, equity, and inclusion policies and the work of former partner Mark F. Pomerantz, who played a leading role in the investigation that ultimately led to Trump's conviction on 34 counts of falsifying business records in New York. On March 19, Paul, Weiss told a judge in a New Jersey case that it had been fired by a client because of the order.

In contrast to Perkins Coie, which sued and obtained a temporary restraining order against the executive order, on March 20, 2025, Paul, Weiss agreed that, in exchange for the order against them being lifted, the firm would commit $40 million toward pro bono legal services in support of Trump administration goals and that they would no longer pursue diversity, equity, and inclusion policies. Pomerantz, who had been a firm partner until 2022, released a statement saying that he had done nothing wrong in his role as a prosecutor.

Later, the New York Times reported that the DEI provision of the deal was not in the text of the final agreement, but rather something Trump himself added and posted to social media. The White House also stated that Karp acknowledged wrongdoing on the part of Pomerantz, which was not true. Karp did not publicly rebut Trump's post or the statement.

The move by Paul, Weiss led other large law firms to sign similar deals with the Trump administration and was widely criticized. Over 140 firm alumni wrote a letter saying, "During the first Trump administration, Paul, Weiss lawyers, including many of us, fought to protect civil and human rights with the firm's support... That is why it came as a shock to find the firm at the very forefront of capitulation to the Trump administration's bullying tactics." J. Michael Luttig, a judge appointed by George W. Bush, wrote that "Paul, Weiss chose to cower before the powerful and sell out its firm and the nation's legal profession to the President."

According to a March 2025 report by The New Yorker on the negotiations between the Trump administration and Paul, Weiss, the firm's management believed that the price of surrendering to the Trump administration "was tolerable... fighting the order in court had good prospects of success—but Karp thought that any win would arrive too late." Two granddaughters of Simon Rifkind wrote to Paul, Weiss's managing partner criticizing the firm's decision.

In May 2025, partners Karen Dunn, Bill Isaacson, Jessica Phillips, and Jeannie Rhee departed from Paul, Weiss to start their own firm, Dunn Isaacson Rhee. Partner Damian Williams left Paul, Weiss for Jenner & Block in June 2025.

Washington, DC-based analyst Nathan Tankus remarked that the "eagerness" shown by powerful law firms to concede to and enter into agreements with the US government is an "early sign" that American institutions are prepared to engage in "systematic appeasement towards Trump's second presidency."

In August 2025, The New York Times reported that Paul, Weiss was doing free legal work for the United States Department of Commerce.

In October 2025, Fabio Bertoni of The New Yorker opined that Paul, Weiss's decision to fold in response to Trump's "unlawful executive order" against the law firm was "shocking at the time, and was taken as a signal within the profession of where the 'smart money' was betting" helping to set a tone whereby other powerful institutions struggled to resist Trump's threats. Eight other law firms followed Paul Weiss's lead, making deals with the Trump Administration, totaling close to $1 billion in pro bono legal work, for causes supported by Trump.

A year later, Bloomberg Law reported, in March 2026, that the firm's agreement with the Trump administration had weakened its reputation, and that other law firms struggled to meet the needs of pro bono work no longer performed by Paul, Weiss.

As a result of its deal with the Trump Administration, the Department of Justice subpoenaed and is investigating Paul, Weiss, in its defense of the White House in the American Bar Association v. Executive Office of the President, filed in June 2025.

==== 2026 resignation due to association of Brad Karp with Jeffrey Epstein ====
Paul, Weiss chairman Brad S. Karp was an associate of serial rapist and sex trafficker Jeffrey Epstein. He wrote to Epstein in 2015, "I can’t thank you enough for including me in an evening I'll never forget ... It was truly 'once in a lifetime' in every way, though I hope to be invited again", and praised Epstein in an email, saying "you're amazing." Bloomberg Legal reported that "the email correspondence between Karp and Epstein occurred after the sex offender pleaded guilty to state charges of solicitation of prostitution with a minor in 2008 and served a year in prison." Karp also plotted with Epstein to attempt to arrange the deportation of a woman who was threatening to sue Apollo's Leon Black for sexual abuse, and when that failed, placed her under surveillance.

Several months before Epstein's death in 2019, Karp reviewed a draft of a court filing for Epstein, writing via email, "I particularly liked the argument that the 'victims' lied in wait and sat on their rights for their strategic advantage, knowing you were in prison, before they came forward." As a result of these revelations, Karp resigned as chairman on February 4, 2026 and was replaced by Scott Barshay, with Karp remaining a partner in the firm's litigation department.

The firm's involvement with Epstein extended beyond standard legal representation and has drawn significant criticism. Investigations indicate that Paul Weiss prioritized its lucrative client, Apollo Global Management, over professional and ethical boundaries, entangling the firm in personal matters including surveillance and private investigations on behalf of Apollo's founder Leon Black. Emails revealed that Karp provided confidential information and guidance to Epstein, including login credentials and sensitive documents, raising questions about compliance with internal confidentiality policies. Paul Weiss's revenue from Apollo surged during this period, drawing internal concern over over-reliance on a single client. Critics have argued that the firm's pursuit of high fees compromised legal ethics and professional judgment, ultimately culminating in Karp stepping down as chair amidst reputational risk.

== Notable representations ==
Paul, Weiss represents detainees held by the U.S. military at the Guantanamo Bay detention camp. A number of the detainees went on a hunger strike to protest alleged inhumane conditions. In response, prison authorities force-fed detainees. Paul, Weiss attorneys filed an emergency application demanding information about the condition of the detainees. In a ruling in October 2005, Judge Gladys Kessler of the United States District Court for the District of Columbia ordered the government to provide the detainees' lawyers with 24 hours' notice before initiating a force-feeding, and to provide lawyers with the detainees' medical records a week before force-feeding.

Paul, Weiss advised the casino operating unit of Caesars Entertainment in its bankruptcy proceedings, taking over the role from O'Melveny & Myers in 2011. It later became known that Apollo Global Management, a private equity sponsor of Caesars, was also a Paul, Weiss client. Paul, Weiss was found to have a conflict of interest in the matter, although an investigation found no actual harm to Caesars or its creditors.

Paul, Weiss represented the China Medical Technologies (CMED) Audit Committee in investigating an anonymous letter alleging possible illegal and fraudulent activities by management, prior to CMED being discovered to have been the subject of a $355 million fraud.

Paul, Weiss issued the report in the Deflategate football inflation controversy in 2015.

In 2016, Fox News hired the firm to conduct an internal investigation about Roger Ailes, leading to the end of Ailes' career.

In 2022, Paul, Weiss was a founding member of the Legal Alliance for Reproductive Rights, a coalition of United States law firms offering free legal services to people seeking and providing abortions in the wake of Dobbs v. Jackson Women's Health Organization (2022), which overruled Roe v. Wade (1973).

Other major clients that Paul, Weiss has represented in litigation include major financial industry companies such as Blackstone Group, Citibank and Goldman Sachs, as well as tech giants Google and Amazon.

=== Pro bono ===
In 2018, Paul, Weiss worked pro bono to try to find more than 400 parents who were separated from their families at the southern border of the United States and then deported. The work was part of the federal American Civil Liberties Union (ACLU) lawsuit, which was brought against the Trump administration over its family separation policy. The ACLU asked Paul, Weiss to head the committee that worked with three nonprofits to find the parents. By November, almost all of the 400 deported parents had been found.

Despite rallying over 30 law firms to join its immigrant family reunification efforts, positioning itself "as a bulwark against Trump"; it was the first law firm to capitulate to Donald Trump's Executive Order in 2025, which other targeted law firms successfully challenged in the courts, instead negotiating a deal with the administration.

== Notable partners ==
- In 1950, Simon Rifkind joined the firm and it became Paul, Weiss, Rifkind, Wharton & Garrison. At the time, the firm had 12 partners, only one of whom did trial work; Rifkind wanted to change that, and started to grow the firm's litigation department.
- Jeh Johnson, fourth director and secretary of the U.S. Department of Homeland Security (DHS), was hired by Paul, Weiss in 1984, and in 1993 became the firm's first African-American partner. After stepping down from the DHS, in 2017, he rejoined the firm.
- John P. Carlin
- Katherine B. Forrest
- Lloyd K. Garrison
- Arthur Joseph Goldberg
- Melinda Haag
- Lewis A. Kaplan
- Brad S. Karp
- Arthur Liman
- Loretta Lynch
- Pauli Murray
- Randolph E. Paul
- Simon H. Rifkind
- Ted Sorensen
- Adlai Stevenson II
- Louis S. Weiss
- Ted Wells
- John F. Wharton

== Notable alumni ==
- Debo Adegbile (Associate)
- Richard Briffault (Associate)
- William Thaddeus Coleman Jr. (Associate)
- Karen Dunn (Partner)
- Ruth Bader Ginsburg (Summer Associate)
- Josh Hsu (Associate)
- Hakeem Jeffries (Associate)
- Jeh Johnson
- Elena Kagan (summer associate)
- Jared Kushner (Summer Associate)
- Debra Ann Livingston (Associate)
- Louis H. Pollak
- Jeannie Rhee (Partner)
- David Rubenstein (Associate)
- Sonia Sotomayor (Summer Associate)
- Kannon Shanmugam (Partner)
- Damian Williams (Partner)
- Martin London (Partner)

== See also ==
- List of largest law firms by profits per partner
