= Karen Dunn =

American lawyer (born 1975)

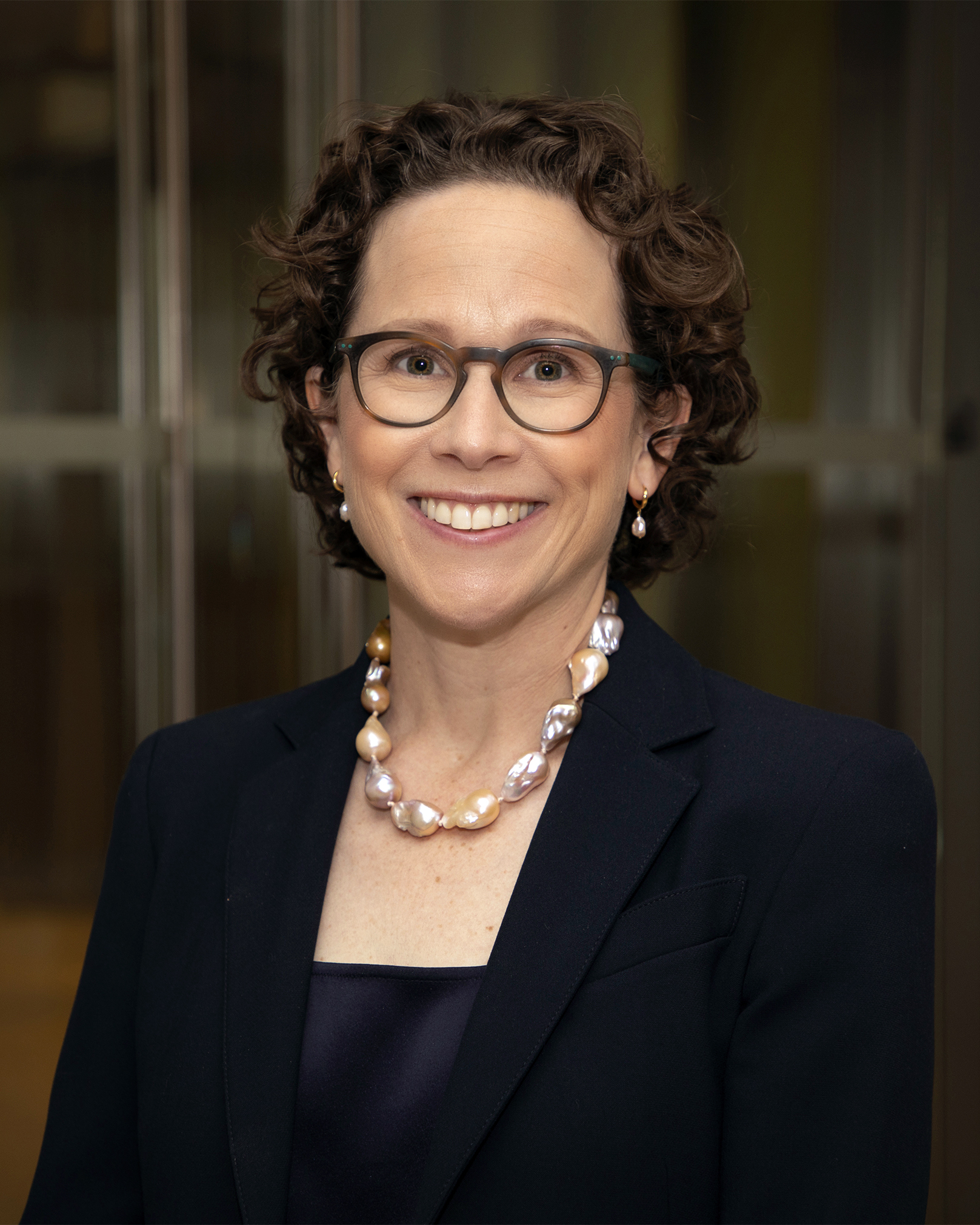
- Born: November 1975 (age 50); New York City, New York, U.S.
- Education: Brown University (BA); Yale University (JD)
- Political party: Democratic
- Spouse: Brian Netter

Karen Dunn (born November 1975) is an American attorney and political operative.

Dunn is a former partner at Paul, Weiss, Rifkind, Wharton & Garrison. As an attorney, she has represented clients including Apple, Oracle, and Uber, and in 2021, she defended Apple in a lawsuit brought by Epic Games.

Dunn is a specialist in debate preparation in Democratic politics, particularly for candidates for president and vice president. Dunn and Ron Klain co-led President Barack Obama's presidential debate preparation team in 2012 and led the presidential debate preparation for Hillary Clinton in 2016. In the fall of 2020, Dunn oversaw preparation of Kamala Harris for the general election vice presidential debates. In 2024, Dunn led debate preparation of Harris for the 2024 United States presidential debates.

Alongside Roberta Kaplan, Dunn was one of the lead attorneys for the plaintiffs in a successful $25 million civil suit against the organizers of Unite the Right Rally in Charlottesville, Virginia.

Dunn was an associate White House counsel in 2009, and an assistant U.S. attorney for the Eastern District of Virginia in 2010.

== Early life and education ==
Dunn is the daughter of Nina Laserson Dunn and Theodore M. Dunn. She received a Bachelor of Arts, magna cum laude, from Brown University and a J.D. from Yale Law School. She is of Jewish descent.

== Career ==
In 1999, Dunn joined the campaign team for Hillary Clinton, who was preparing to run for a Senate seat in New York. Following Clinton’s election to the Senate, Dunn worked as press secretary for Clinton, then as her communications director until 2003.

After law school, Dunn served as a law clerk to United States Court of Appeals for the District of Columbia Circuit Judge Merrick Garland in 2006. In 2007, she was a law clerk for United States Supreme Court Justice Stephen Breyer.

Dunn became deputy to Obama’s chief strategist, David Axelrod, in July 2008. Following Obama’s inauguration in 2009, she was named associate White House counsel. In July of that same year, Dunn prepared Sonia Sotomayor for the Senate hearings before her confirmation as a Supreme Court justice.

Dunn was hired as a prosecutor for the Eastern District of Virginia in 2010.

In 2012, Dunn co-directed preparation for Obama’s re-election campaign debates.

She joined private practice as partner at the law firm Boies, Schiller, and Flexner in 2014. The same year, Dunn and her husband Brian Netter, also an attorney, served as pro bono counsel on behalf of the D.C. Council, which filed suit against District of Columbia Mayor Vincent C. Gray and chief financial officer Jeffrey DeWitt over their refusal to act on the 2012 Budget Autonomy Act. The Superior Court of the District of Columbia ruled in favor of Dunn and Netter’s clients, the D.C. Council, in 2016.

Dunn and colleague Bill Isaacson successfully defended Apple in a $1 billion class action lawsuit over an update to its iPod music player, winning a unanimous verdict in favor of the technology company in December 2014.

Dunn oversaw Hillary Clinton’s debate preparation for both the Democratic primaries and the general election presidential debates in 2016. According to authors Jonathan Allen and Amie Parnes in their book Shattered: Inside Hillary Clinton's Doomed Campaign, Dunn was considered as a lead contender to serve as White House Counsel should Hillary Clinton have won the presidency in 2016.

In 2017, Dunn defended Uber in a case in which Uber was accused by autonomous driving technology company Waymo of stealing driverless technology trade secrets. Following Dunn’s February 7, 2018 questioning of former Uber CEO Travis Kalanick regarding the company’s early interest in the technology of autonomous driving cars, the trial ended abruptly on February 9 and later that month it was settled out of court.

The American Lawyer magazine named Dunn “Litigator of the Year” in 2017, citing her “high-stakes” work defending Uber; representing Apple in a patent lawsuit disputing the Qualcomm patent licensing model; and summary judgment for Beats - owned by Apple - in a $1 billion suit brought by Monster.

Dunn was one of the lead attorneys in the civil suit against the organizers of the 2017 Unite the Right Rally in Charlottesville, Virginia, representing multiple Charlottesville residents and counter-protesters. In her opening statement, Dunn argued that rally organizers "came to Charlottesville with a plan for violence with racial and religious hatred” and “that they used race and religious hatred to motivate others to join". Dunn’s clients were awarded more than $25 million in damages in November 2021.

In July 2020, Dunn became a partner at the law firm Paul, Weiss, Rifkind, Wharton & Garrison. At Paul, Weiss, Dunn counseled Jeff Bezos during his testimony before a congressional committee in July 2020.

During the 2020 election cycle, Dunn oversaw Kamala Harris’s preparation for the general election vice presidential debates.

In 2021, Dunn defended Apple against a lawsuit brought by Epic Games, the maker of Fortnite in a case that NPR described as “the most high-profile antitrust trial in the technology world in decades…”

=== Other activities ===
She was an adviser to the political thriller television series House of Cards.

== Personal life ==
In 2009, Dunn married attorney Brian Netter, whom she met at Yale Law School.
