= Jenner & Block =

American law firm

Jenner & Block LLP
- Headquarters: 353 North Clark; Chicago, Illinois, United States
- No. of offices: 6
- No. of attorneys: 434
- Major practice areas: General practice
- Key people: Thomas J. Perrelli, Chairman; Katya Jestin and Randall E. Mehrberg, Co-Managing Partners
- Revenue: $408 million (2014)
- Date founded: 1914
- Founder: Jacob Newman, Conrad Poppenhusen, and Henry Stern
- Company type: Limited liability partnership
- Website: Jenner & Block

Jenner & Block is an American law firm with offices in Century City, Chicago, London, Los Angeles, New York City, San Francisco, and Washington, D.C. The firm is active in corporate litigation, business transactions, the public sector, and other legal fields. It has litigated several prominent cases before the United States Supreme Court. As of 2014, it was the 103rd-largest law firm in the US, based on The American Lawyer's annual ranking of firms by headcount.

== History ==
The firm was founded in Chicago in 1914 as Newman, Poppenhusen & Stern. In late 1928, a former chief justice of the Illinois Supreme Court, Floyd Thompson, joined the firm. Albert E. Jenner, Jr., who served as a former assistant counsel to the Warren Commission, established Jenner & Block's longstanding relationship representing General Dynamics in the 1950s. He later was senior minority counsel on the impeachment inquiry staff for the Republicans on the House Judiciary Committee during the impeachment process against Richard Nixon, but was replaced in July 1974 after advocating for the impeachment of Nixon.

Jenner & Block was one of the first national law firms to establish a Washington practice specifically focused on appeals before the U.S. Supreme Court. A number of lawyers in the Washington office have served as clerks to the US Supreme Court. This office was once headed by Bruce Ennis, Jr., who argued more than a dozen cases before the Supreme Court, including three cases arising under different provisions of the same law, the landmark Telecommunications Act of 1996. The appellate practice was once led by Paul M. Smith. Donald Verrilli Jr., who succeeded Elena Kagan as U.S. solicitor general during the Obama administration, is a former member of the practice.

In 1954, future United States Attorney for the Northern District of Illinois Thomas P. Sullivan joined the firm, and helped establish its pro bono program; Jenner & Block became known as advocates for indigent prisoners facing capital punishment.

Since its founding, the firm has had 10 names. The name of the firm was changed to Raymond Mayer Jenner & Block in 1964 after Samuel W. Block became a name partner. In 1969, it was shortened to its present form.

The firm's 1985 antitrust lawsuit of AT&T, on behalf of MCI, sowed the seeds for the eventual break-up of telecommunications monopoly in the 1980s.

=== Targeting by the second Trump administration ===
Reportedly motivated by personal grievances; actions by the second administration of U.S. President Donald Trump to punish law firms that offered services to the president's perceived political opponents included, on March 25, 2025, President Trump signing an executive order taking action against Jenner & Block. Trump criticized the firm's employment of Andrew Weissmann, who was involved in the Mueller special counsel investigation. On March 28, 2025, the firm sued to stop the executive order, standing out, as some of the other prominent law firms targeted by Trump surrendered to him rather than resist his aggressive campaigns against them. The following day, two district court judges temporarily blocked parts of the executive orders targeting both Jenner & Block and law firm WilmerHale.

=== Pro bono work ===
In 2005, the firm received the National Coalition to Abolish the Death Penalty's "Legal Service Award" for its work with death row inmates. A team, along with the Veterans Legal Services Clinic at Yale Law School, successfully represented a proposed nationwide class of Vietnam War veterans suffering from post-traumatic stress disorder who challenged their less-than-honorable discharges from the military. The representation also prompted the Secretary of Defense to issue new guidance to the administrative boards hearing discharge upgrade requests to consider PTSD diagnoses for veterans.

According to annual surveys by The American Lawyer, in 2014 and 2015, Jenner & Block was the leading law firm for per-attorney hours devoted to pro bono work in the US. From 2008 to 2015, it was the leader for five of those seven years.

Recent pro bono victories include the acquittal of Jezon Young and the 2012 acquittal of Calvin Marshall who had been charged with murder.

== Notable cases ==
- Maple Flooring Manufacturers' Association v. US: The firm had an early US Supreme Court victory in an antitrust case that helped establish its appellate credentials. The firm represented the Maple Flooring Manufacturers Association, a trade association based in Grand Rapids, Michigan. The US government charged that the group's activities — such as sharing weekly statistics showing charges that had been made for various grades of lumber during the previous week — violated the Sherman Act. The firm's principal litigator at the time, Edward Johnston, argued that the Association shared permissible economic information. In June 1925, the Court agreed.
- Sam Insull cases: In the 1930s, former chief justice of the Illinois Supreme Court Floyd Thompson successfully defended Chicago utility czar Samuel Insull in three separate federal and state trials related to the collapse of his empire after the Great Depression.
- Witherspoon v. Illinois: The firm represented William Witherspoon, who had been sentenced to death for the shooting death of a police officer, on a pro bono basis. In 1968, the US Supreme Court ruled that a state statute providing the state unlimited challenge for cause of jurors who might have any objection to the death penalty gave too much bias in favor of the prosecution. The Court reasoned: "A jury that must choose between life imprisonment and capital punishment can do little more — and must do nothing less — than express the conscience of the community on the ultimate question of life or death. Yet, in a nation less than half of whose people believe in the death penalty, a jury composed exclusively of such people cannot speak for the community." The Court added: "To execute this death sentence would deprive [Witherspoon] of his life without the due process of the law." As a result of the Witherspoon decision, more than 350 inmates on death row around the nation had their death sentences lifted.
- Lawrence v. Texas: A significant case to ensure civil rights for the gay, lesbian and transgender community. In 2003, working with the Lambda Legal Defense Fund, the firm challenged Texas' anti-sodomy statute. The US Supreme Court struck down the statute, effectively invalidating anti-sodomy laws throughout the nation. Justice Anthony Kennedy wrote that two gay men arrested after police walked in on them having sex "are entitled to respect for their private lives. The state cannot demean their existence or control their destiny by making their private sexual conduct a crime."
- Lehman Brothers bankruptcy: After Lehman Brothers filed for bankruptcy in 2008—the largest bankruptcy in US history—the court hired Jenner & Block's Chairman Anton Valukas to examine Lehman's collapse. Some commentators pointed to the bankruptcy as a factor contributing to the 2008 financial crisis. In March 2010, Valukas issued his 2,200-page report on the matter.
- General Motors bankruptcy: In the late 2000s, General Motors had what The American Lawyer called a "near-death" experience as it filed for bankruptcy. In 2010, the $23 billion offering by GM set the record as the largest initial public offering (IPO) in history. Jenner & Block represented GM as it went through bankruptcy and the subsequent IPO.
- Brown v. Entertainment Merchants Association: The firm represented the Entertainment Merchants Association in a battle against a California law that restricted the sale or rental of violent video games to minors. In 2011, the US Supreme Court agreed with the firm's argument that the law violated the First Amendment's protection of freedom of speech and expression. Justice Antonin Scalia wrote that depictions of violence have never been subject to government regulation.
- American Broadcasting Cos. v. Aereo, Inc.: The firm represented a group of broadcasting company clients in a fight against Aereo, Inc., a company that retransmitted copyrighted television programming without broadcaster authorization for a fee. In June 2014, the US Supreme Court agreed with the firm's argument that Aereo violated copyright law. Aereo filed for Chapter 11 bankruptcy in November 2014.

== Recognition ==
The firm has won numerous awards for its work.

In 2015, The National Law Journal named Jenner & Block to its "Appellate Hot List" of 20 national firms "with outstanding achievements before the US Supreme Court, federal circuit courts and state courts of last resort", the seventh consecutive year that the firm was so ranked. The firm was also named to The National Law Journal's 2015 "IP Hot List."

The American Lawyer ranked the first among all U.S. law firms in the volume of its pro bono work, in 2025, for the fifth time during of the previous seven years.

The firm was listed as #63 among the Vault Law 100 in 2025.

The American Lawyer jointly named Jenner & Block Law Firm of the Year in 2025, among eight firms, four of which were honored for successful challenges to executive orders, and four others for legal representations of those firms.

== Offices ==
Jenner & Block is headquartered in downtown Chicago. In 1982, the firm opened an office in Washington. In 2005, a New York City office was launched followed by the opening of a Los Angeles office in 2009. In April 2015, the firm opened a London office, its first outside the U.S.

== Notable partners and alumni ==
- Albert E. Jenner Jr.
- Samuel W. Block
- John Paul Stevens (predecessor firm)
- Thomas P. Sullivan
- Bruce Ennis
- Donald Verrilli
- Ann O'Leary
- Josh Hsu
- Ian Gershengorn
- Thomas Perrelli
- Leondra Kruger, Associate Justice, Supreme Court of California
- Kenneth K. Lee
- Ajit Pai
- Andrew Weissmann
- Amir Ali (judge)
- Jenny Martinez
- Heather Gerken
- Damian Williams

== See also ==
- List of largest United States-based law firms by profits per partner
