= List of Guantanamo Bay detainees cleared for release in 2009 =

Rear Admiral Thomas H. Copeman III, Commandant of the Guantanamo Bay detention camps, ordered the posting of the official list of Guantanamo captives cleared in 2009. During the last years of the Presidency of George W. Bush captives had annual reviews conducted by an Office for the Administrative Review of Detained Enemy Combatants.

On January 22, 2009, two days after President Barack Obama took office, he issued Executive Orders 13491, 13492 and 13493, all of which concerned how the United States should treat its captives.

The new policies superseded the older reviews, and included new, inter-agency reviews. President Obama announced plans to close the camps before January 22, 2010. According to the Associated Press and Reuters Admiral Copeman ordered the lists of captives who had been cleared for release to be posted to prevent the spread of rumors. Reuters reported the official list included 78 names. A further 17 captives have been repatriated or transferred since President Obama took office.

== Nationality of Guantanamo captives cleared for release in 2009 ==
Nationality of Guantanamo captives cleared for release in 2009 as of 2009-09-28
cleared	nationality	not cleared
26	Yemen	70
13	Uyghur	0
9	Tunisia	1
7	Algeria	9
4	Syria	4
3	Libya	4
3	Saudi Arabia	13
2	Uzbekistan	2
2	Egypt	1
2	West bank	0
2	Kuwait	2
1	Azerbaijan	0
1	Tajikistan	1
0	Indonesia	1

== Captives known to have been released, transferred or repatriated in 2009 ==
Six captives left Guantanamo on January 17, 2009, four days before Barack Obama took office.

As of September 29, 2009 17 captives have been released, transferred or repatriated sing Barack Obama took office and reversed some policies of the George W. Bush Presidency. Some of these men were released, after a habeas corpus petition ruled that the USA was holding them illegally. Other captive were not cleared of suspicion of playing a role that had threatened the USA, but were repatriated to their home country, or transferred to the custody of a third country, because they were determined to no longer pose a significant threat.

In addition a captive died while in the camp's psychiatric wing, and another captive was transferred to the USA to stand trial in civilian court.

Captives known to have been released, transferred or repatriated in 2009
ISN	transfer date	transfer type	nationality	destination	name	notes
968	2009-01-17	release	Greece	Greece	Alex Korakitis	An administrative review by military officers determined that he was not an enemy combatant after all.
175	2009-01-17	repatriation	Algeria	Algeria	Hassan Mujamma Rabai Said	Identity initially withheld following repatriation.
111	2009-01-17	repatriation	Iraq	Iraq	Ali Abdul Motalib Awayd Hassan al Tayeea	Identity initially withheld following repatriation.
435	2009-01-17	repatriation	Iraq	Iraq	Hassan Abdul Said	Identity initially withheld following repatriation.
653	2009-01-17	repatriation	Iraq	Iraq	Arkan Mohammad Ghafil al Karim	Identity initially withheld following repatriation.
758	2009-01-17	repatriation	Iraq	Iraq	Abbas Habid Rumi al Naely	Identity initially withheld following repatriation.
1458	2009-02-23	transfer	Ethiopia	United Kingdom	Binyam Mohamed	Binyam Mohamed had long-term permanent resident status in the United Kingdom prior to visiting Afghanistan.; He was held for years in CIA custody, where he described horrific torture, and that all his confessions were triggered by coercive interrogation.; Charges were laid against him before a military commission that he had plotted with Jose Padilla, Abu Zubaydah and Majid Khan to explode dirty bombs in the USA.; When evidence emerged that he really had been tortured, and that UK security officials were complicit in the torture, the UK government negotiated for the charges to be dropped and for him to be transferred to the UK.
10005	2009-05-15	release	Bosnia	France	Lakhdar Boumediene	On June 12, 2008 the United States Supreme Court ruled in Boumediene v. Bush in June 2008 that Guantanamo captives were entitled to access the United States' civilian justice system.; On November 20, 2008 US District Court Judge Richard Leon ruled in his habeas corpus petition that the evidence did not support the claim that Boumediene and four other Bosnians of Algerian descent were enemy combatants.; After some negotiation Boumediene, who had family ties in France, was granted asylum in France.
10012	2009-06-09	trial	Tanzania	US	Ahmed Khalfan Ghailani	One of the captives who spent years in the CIA's black sites.; The first Guantanamo captive transferred to the United States to stand trial in Civilian court on charges he helped plan attacks on American embassies in Africa.
433	2009-06-10	repatriation	Iraq	Iraq	Jawad Jabber Sadkhan	Identity initially withheld following repatriation.
269	2009-06-10	release	Chad	Chad	Mohammed El Gharani	Captured in Pakistan, when he was still a child.; Although El Gharani is officially a citizen of Chad, he was born in Saudi Arabia to Chadian guest workers. He had never lived in Chad, and couldn't communicate with anyone there.
278	2009-06-11	release	Uyghur	Bermuda	Khaleel Mamut	In September 2008 the Department of Justice abandons the "enemy combatant" classification for the remaining seventeen Uyghur captives in Guantanamo after Huzaifa Parhat's DTA petition overturned his Combatant Status Review Tribunal's determination. They are all moved to Camp Iguana.; On June 11, 2009 Khaleel Mamut and three other Uyghurs are accepted by Bermuda, even though the United Kingdom still controls Bermuda's Defence and Foreign Affairs.
285	2009-06-11	release	Uyghur	Bermuda	Abdullah Abdulqadirakhun	In September 2008 the Department of Justice abandons the "enemy combatant" classification for the remaining seventeen Uyghur captives in Guantanamo after Huzaifa Parhat's DTA petition overturned his Combatant Status Review Tribunal's determination. They are all moved to Camp Iguana.; On June 11, 2009 Abdulla Abdulqadir and three other Uyghurs are accepted by Bermuda, even though the United Kingdom still controls Bermuda's Defence and Foreign Affairs.
295	2009-06-11	release	Uyghur	Bermuda	Salahidin Abdulahat	In September 2008 the Department of Justice abandons the "enemy combatant" classification for the remaining seventeen Uyghur captives in Guantanamo after Huzaifa Parhat's DTA petition overturned his Combatant Status Review Tribunal's determination. They are all moved to Camp Iguana.; On June 11, 2009 Salahidin Abdulahat and three other Uyghurs are accepted by Bermuda, even though the United Kingdom still controls Bermuda's Defence and Foreign Affairs.
320	2009-06-11	release	Uyghur	Bermuda	Ablikim Turahun	In September 2008 the Department of Justice abandons the "enemy combatant" classification for the remaining seventeen Uyghur captives in Guantanamo after Huzaifa Parhat's DTA petition overturned his Combatant Status Review Tribunal's determination. They are all moved to Camp Iguana.; On June 11, 2009 Ablikim Turahun and three other Uyghurs are accepted by Bermuda, even though the United Kingdom still controls Bermuda's Defence and Foreign Affairs.
335	2009-06-12		Saudi Arabia	Saudi Arabia	Khalid Saad Mohammed	
669	2009-06-12		Saudi Arabia	Saudi Arabia	Ahmed Zaid Salim Zuhair	A long term hunger striker, whose weight had dropped dangerously low, in spite of twice-daily force-feeding.
687	2009-06-12		Saudi Arabia	Saudi Arabia	Abdalaziz Kareem Salim al Noofayaee	
900	2009-08-24	release	Afghanistan	Afghanistan	Mohammed Jawad	A child when captured, he faced charges before a Guantanamo military commission.; His Prosecutor resigned when he realized that the evidence against Jawad consisted largely of coerced confessions.; US District Court Judge Ellen S. Huvelle, the judge presiding over his habeas corpus petition, also ruled the confessions were coerced, and thus inadmissible, and orders his release.; United States Attorney General Eric Holder orders a new criminal investigation. The Justice Department claims they have new witnesses, which will justify laying new charges against Jawad in a civilian court in the USA.; Jawad's lawyer's travel to Afghanistan, visit the site of the bombing, and interview the witnesses, who invite them to outbid the Prosecution. The Prosecution's case collapses.
312	2009-08-28	transfer	Syria	Portugal	Muhammad Abd Al Nasir Muhammad Khantumani	Transferred to Portugal on 2009-08-28.
317	2009-08-28	transfer	Syria	Portugal	Moammar Badawi Dokhan	Transferred to Portugal on 2009-08-28.
692	2009/09/26	release	Yemen	Yemen	Alla Ali Bin Ali Ahmed	US District Court Judge Gladys Kessler ordered All Ali Bin Ali Ahmed's release from Guantanamo on May 5, 2009.; According to the Los Angeles Times: "The judge gave the government until June 15 to report on the status of his release."
22	2009-09-26	transfer	Uzbekistan	Ireland	Shakrukh Hamiduva	Was not given any annual Administrative Review Board hearings.; Identified as a transferred captive by The New York Times.
452	2009-09-26	transfer	Uzbekistan	Ireland	Oybek Jamoldinivich Jabbarov	Identified as a transferred captive by The New York Times.
213	2009-10-09	repatriation	Kuwait	Kuwait	Khalid Mutairi	US District Court Judge Colleen Kollar-Kottely; ordered the immediate repatriation of Khaled Al Mutairi on July 29, 2009.: transferred from Guantanamo on October 9, 2009.
	2009-10-09	transfer		Belgium		His name and nationality were withheld.; Belgian officials said he was a free man, who would be aided into a rapid re-integration into society, `after a particularly difficult time in Guantánamo.'.
