= List of Bosnian detainees at Guantanamo Bay =

The United States Department of Defense acknowledges holding approximately a dozen Bosnian citizens detained at Guantanamo Bay.

A total of 778 detainees have been held in the Guantanamo Bay detention camps, in Cuba since the camps opened on January 11, 2002. The camp population peaked in 2004 to approximately 660. Only 19 new detainees, all "high value detainees" have been transferred there since the United States Supreme Court's ruling in Rasul v. Bush. As of January 6, 2025, 15 detainees remain at Guantanamo Bay.

== Bosnian detainees in Guantanamo ==
ISN	Mug shot	Name	Status	Notes
65		Omar Rajab Amin	Transferred	Joint citizen of Kuwait and Bosnia.; Testified he arrived in Bosnia after the civil war was over, as an aid worker.; Testified he fell in love with a Bosnian woman, and took Bosnian citizenship.; Testified he paid the official fee for becoming a citizen, but he believed the citizenship clerk had added him to the list of foreign fighters who had aided Bosnia during the civil war, so he could pocket the fee. The official fee for new citizens was waived for veterans.
535		Tariq Mahmoud Ahmed Al Sawah	Released	Allegedly attended a bomb-making course.; Allegedly served on the front lines in Afghanistan.; Acknowledges he had lived for a time in Bosnia, unclear if he was a citizen. He denied engaging in hostilities in Bosnia.; Acknowledges providing military training in Afghanistan, but said that it was all prior to 9-11, so none of it was in violation of US laws.; There is no record that he has been released—or that an Administrative Review Boards convened to conduct his annual review in 2005 or 2006.
10001		Bensayah Belkacem	Transferred	Originally charged, tried and acquitted of plotting to bomb the US embassy in Sarajevo, based on signals intelligence.; Apprehended and subjected to extraordinary rendition and held in extrajudicial detention by the USA after his acquittal.
10002		Sabir Mahfouz Lahmar	Transferred	Suspected of plotting to bomb the US embassy in Sarajevo.; Told his Tribunal that his interrogators refused to interrogate him over the alleged Embassy bombing plot.
10003		Mohammed Nechle	Transferred	Allegedly has ties to the Algerian Islamic Group.; Suspected of involvement in a plot to bomb the US embassy in Sarajevo.
10004		Mustafa Ait Idr	Transferred	
10005		Lakhdar Boumediene	Transferred	
10006		Hadj Boudella	Transferred	

== See also ==
- Algerian Six
