= Hadj Boudella =

Algerian-Bosnian former Guantanamo detainee

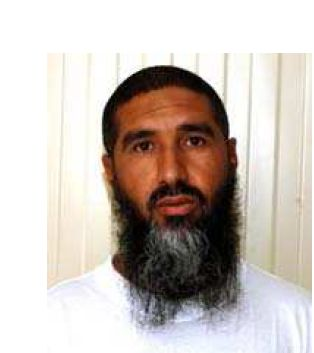
- Born: April 18, 1965 (age 61); Algeria
- Detained at: Guantanamo Bay camp
- Other name: Boudella al Hajj
- ISN: 10006
- Charge: No charges (unlawful detained)
- Status: Released in December 2008 after winning his habeas corpus
- Occupation: Worked with Bosnian orphans
- Spouse: Nađa Dizdarević

Hadj Boudella (born April 18, 1965) is a citizen of Bosnia who was wrongfully detained for over six years in the United States Guantanamo Bay detainment camps, in Cuba.

He was born in Algeria, moved to Bosnia, married Nađa Dizdarević a Bosnian woman, and became a Bosnian citizen. Boudella, and five associates of his, who were also Algerian-born Bosnians were arrested by Bosnian authorities. Local United States intelligence officials said they detected "chatter" that implicated the six in a conspiracy to bomb the US embassy in Bosnia.

He won his habeas corpus and US District Court Judge Richard J. Leon wrote that there was no evidence that Boudella intended to travel to Afghanistan to take up arms against US forces. Judge Leon declared Boudella's detention as unlawful and ordered his release in November 2008. He was released from Guantanamo and returned to his family in Bosnia on December 16, 2008.

== Wife hunger strike ==
In June 2005, Boudella's wife, Nađa Dizdarević, started the first of several hunger strikes to protest her husbands detention at Guantanamo Bay, Cuba. She said she would end her hunger strike only when she received written confirmation from Bosnia's presidency it would address the issue with Washington.

== Release ==
On December 16, 2008, Hadj Boudella, Mustafa Idr, and Mohammed Nechle were released to Bosnia.

On March 3, 2009, El Khabar reported that the Bush administration forced Idr and the other two men to sign undertakings that they would not sue the US government for their kidnapping, before they would be released.

== See also ==
- Algerian Six
