= Lakhdar Boumediene =

Algerian-Bosnian formerly detained at Guantanamo Bay detention camp from 2002 to 2009

Lakhdar Boumediene لخضر بومدين
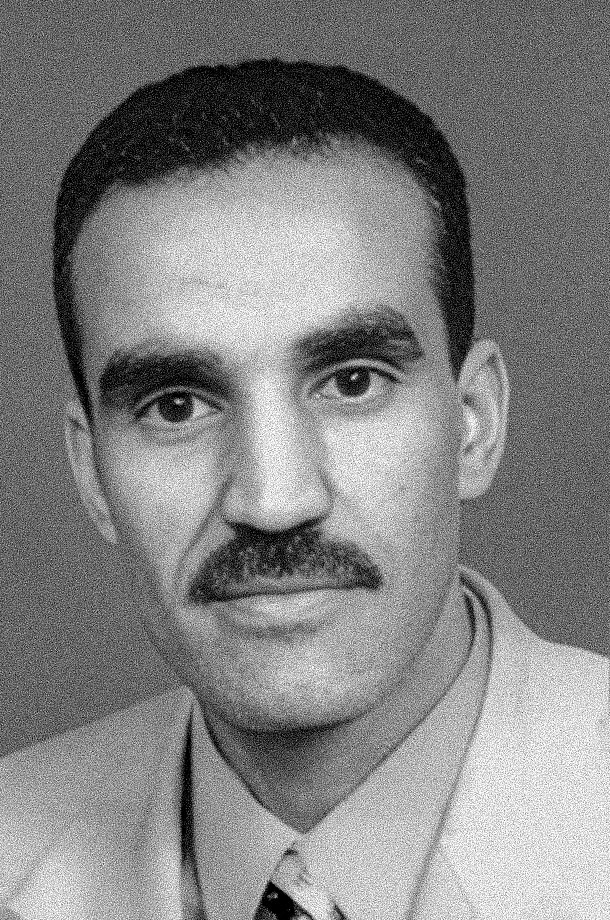
- Born: April 27, 1966 (age 60); Aïn Soltane, Saïda, Algeria
- Released: May 19, 2009; France
- Detained at: Guantanamo
- ISN: 10005
- Status: Released

Lakhdar Boumediene (Arabic: لخضر بومدين; born April 27, 1966) is an Algerian-born citizen of Bosnia and Herzegovina who was held in military custody in the United States Guantanamo Bay detention camps in Cuba beginning in January 2002.

Boumediene was the lead plaintiff in Boumediene v. Bush (2008), a U.S. Supreme Court decision that Guantanamo detainees and other foreign nationals have the right to file writs of habeas corpus in U.S. federal courts.

He and four other of the Algerian Six plaintiffs were released from Guantánamo on May 15, 2009, after a US Federal judge found that "the Bush administration relied on insufficient evidence to imprison them indefinitely as 'enemy combatants.'" He lives in Provence, France, with his wife and children.

== Background ==
I lived in a nightmare for seven years. Even animals are treated better. ... My daughter does not recognize me. I didn't see my wife for seven years. I lost everything. Who will give me these years back?

— Lakhdar Boumediene

Born and raised in Algeria, as an adult Boumediene worked for various humanitarian causes. He worked for the Red Crescent Society of the United Arab Emirates. It also had an office in Sarajevo and, at the request of his employer, Boumediene moved with his family to Bosnia, where he served as director of humanitarian aid for children who had lost relatives during the Yugoslav Wars. He became a Bosnian citizen in 1998.

In early October 2001, less than a month after al Qaeda's attacks of September 11, 2001, in the United States, intelligence analysts in the United States Embassy in Sarajevo became concerned that an increase in chatter was a clue that al-Qaeda was planning an attack on the embassy there. At their request, Bosnia arrested Bensayah Belkacem, the man they believed had made dozens of phone calls to Afghanistan and Pakistan, and five acquaintances of his, including Boumediene. All six were Algerian-born residents of Bosnia, and five were Bosnian citizens; one had permanent residency status. They all worked for charities and non-profits.

In January 2002, the Supreme Court of Bosnia ruled that there was no evidence to hold the six men, and ordered the charges dropped and the men released. American forces, including troops who were part of a 3,000-man American peace-keeping contingent in Bosnia, were waiting for the six men upon their release from Bosnian custody. They immediately seized the six and transported them to the Guantánamo Bay detention camp on a US naval base in Cuba. They were detained and interrogated without being charged.

In the summer of 2004, the Algerian Six filed suit against the US government with the help of the Center for Constitutional Rights and a team from Wilmer Cutler Pickering Hale and Dorr, challenging their detention without charges and claiming the protection of habeas corpus.

== Hunger strike and force-feeding ==
Boumediene went on a two-year hunger strike while imprisoned, because "no one would tell me why I was imprisoned". He was force fed twice a day by having a feeding tube inserted in his nose and down into his stomach. His lawyer, Stephen Oleskey, described the force feeding as follows:

Twice a day he is strapped onto a chair at seven points. One side of his nose is broken, so they put it (the tube) in the other side ... Sometimes it goes to his lung instead of his stomach. He can't say anything because he has the mask on: that's torture.

== US Supreme Court case ==
In Boumediene v. Bush in October 2008, the US Supreme Court ruled in their favor, saying that the detainees and other foreign nationals had the right to file in federal courts under habeas corpus.

On November 20, 2008, U.S. District Judge Richard J. Leon ordered the release of Lakhdar Boumediene and four of the Algerian Six based on lack of sufficient evidence. The sixth detainee, Bensayah Belkacem, was recommended for continued detention, but his case was later reviewed. Belkacem was eventually released.

== Release to France ==
On May 15, 2009, Boumediene was transferred to France, where he has relatives. His wife and children have joined him and they have settled in Provence. He has had difficulty in getting employment, due to his lengthy imprisonment.

In January 2020, in an interview with RFI France, Boumediene stated that he hadn't left France in 10 years, expressing his concerns about still-existing legal uncertainty, in relation to U.S. law and practice towards former Guantánamo prisoners.

== Open letter to President Biden ==
On January 29, 2021, the New York Review of Books published an open letter from Boumediene, and six other individuals who were formerly held in Guantanamo, to newly inaugurated President Biden, appealing to him to close the detention camp.

== See also ==
- Hunger strike
- Algerian Six
- Murat Kurnaz, German citizen imprisoned five years at Guantanamo and released
