= Melissa Hoffer =

American environmental lawyer and Massachusetts Climate Chief

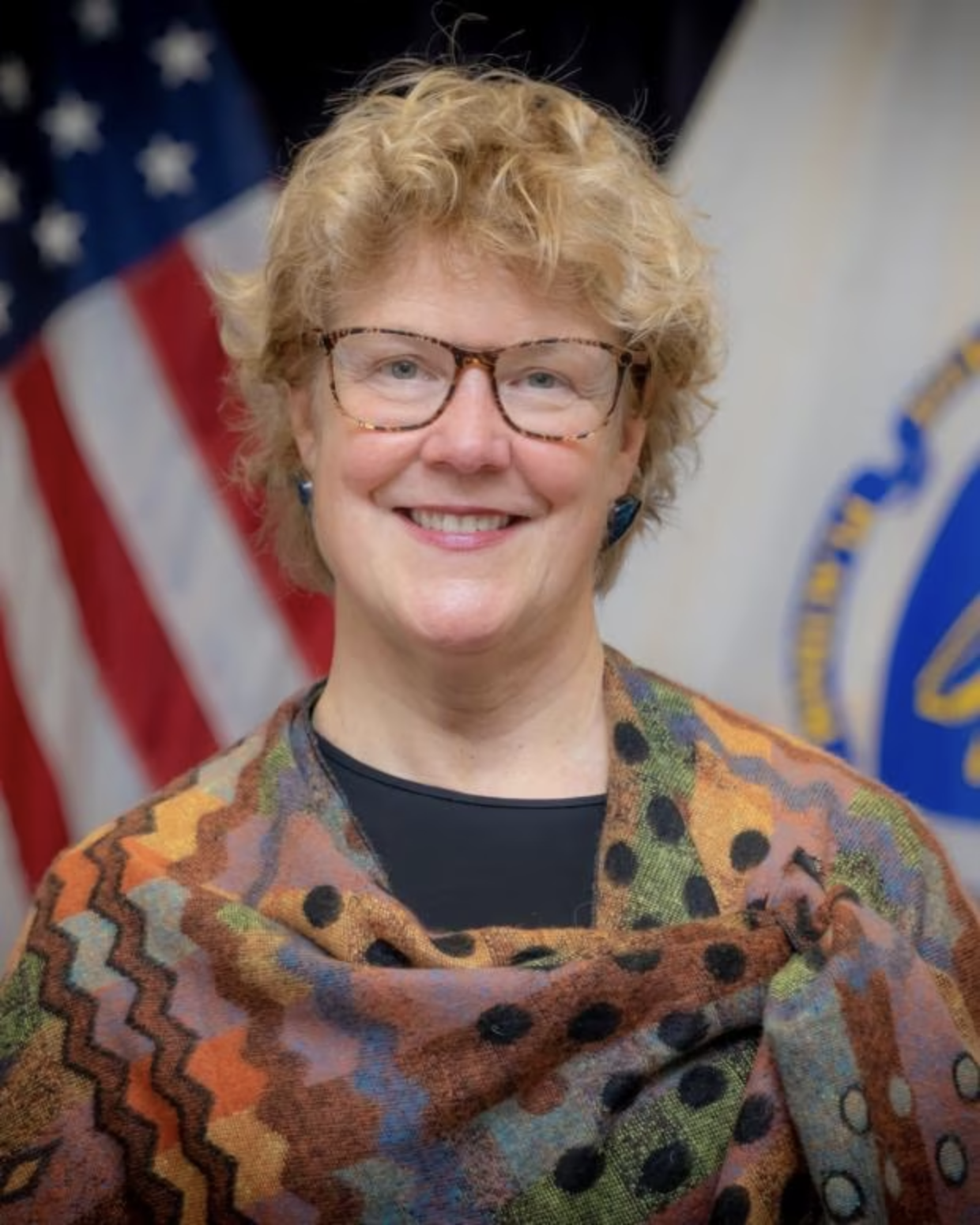
- Official portrait, 2023

First Climate Chief of Massachusetts
- Incumbent
- Assumed office April 2023
- Governor: Maura Healey

Principal Deputy General Counsel of the Environmental Protection Agency
- In office January 20, 2021 – April 2022
- President: Joe Biden

Acting General Counsel of the Environmental Protection Agency
- In office January 20, 2021 – November 2021
- President: Joe Biden

First Chief of the Massachusetts Energy and Environment Bureau
- In office 2015–2021

Head of the Massachusetts Environmental Protection Division
- In office 2012–2015

Vice President of the Conservation Law Foundation
- In office 2007–2012

Personal details
- Born: Pennsylvania, USA
- Education: Hampshire College (BA); University of Massachusetts (M.Ed); Northeastern University (JD)
- Occupation: Environmental lawyer

Melissa A. Hoffer is an American environmental lawyer currently serving as the Climate Chief of Massachusetts, the first to hold a seat of this kind in the country. Hoffer previously worked in the Attorney General of Massachusetts' office, the Conservation Law Foundation (CLF), and WilmerHale. She was a "day one" appointee to President Joe Biden's cabinet as Principal Deputy General Counsel and Acting General Counsel of the Environmental Protection Agency. As a lawyer, she headed cases including Boumediene v. Bush (related to the Algerian Six) and Commonwealth v. Exxon Mobil Corp. She believes in a "whole-of-government approach" to climate change and that environmental issues should not be isolated to a single government department.

== Early life and education ==
A native of southeastern Pennsylvania, Hoffer holds a BA from Hampshire College, an M.Ed from University of Massachusetts, a JD from Northeastern University School of Law (1998), and a certificate in environmental management from Tufts University.

== Career ==
Hoffer taught high school social studies in San Francisco before going into environmental law. She was with the Boston firm WilmerHale from 1999 to 2007, where she was promoted to junior partner in 2003. While there, she led the pro bono team, recruited by the Center for Constitutional Rights, that represented the Algerian Six, a group of Algerian-Bosnian men who had been kidnapped by US officials and kept at Guantanamo Bay. They had been detained and undergone torture there since January 2002 without being charged with any crimes, which Hoffer and her team argued was in violation of habeas corpus. This violation was not uncommon in detainee cases during the War on Terror. She and her team travelled to Guantanamo to interview their clients and she was one of several contributors to a book about Guantanamo attorneys, wherein she discussed the torture endured by one of her clients. In October 2008, in Boumediene v. Bush, the US Supreme Court ruled that habeas and other protections of the US Constitution applied to detainees at Guantanamo and other foreign nationals. The judge ruled that five of the Algerian Six were being held illegally and ordered their release. The sixth prisoner, Bensayah Belkacem, later had his case appealed and was freed in 2010.

After leaving WilmerHale in 2007, Hoffer worked as the Vice President of the Conservation Law Foundation, where she became the director of the Healthy Communities and Environmental Justice program, as well as the CLF New Hampshire Advocacy Center. She also started the Sustainable Farm & Food System and the Transportation for Massachusetts initiatives and raised awareness about the pollution caused by coal-fired power plants like Brayton Point Power Station.

Hoffer was a law clerk for Magistrate Joyce London Alexander in Boston. She then moved to the Attorney General of Massachusetts office in 2012 as the head and the chief attorney of the Environmental Protection Division. In this role, she led the litigation against ExxonMobil for not adequately informing investors and residents in Massachusetts of the true impact of fossil fuels on the climate. In 2013, Hoffer taught environmental law and human rights at Hampshire College, her alma mater. In 2015, she became the first head of the new Energy and Environment Bureau under Attorney General Maura Healey. Hoffer was a "day one appointee" into President Joe Biden's cabinet. She was Acting General Counsel of the Environmental Protection Agency (EPA) from January 20, 2021 through November 2021 and Principal Deputy General Counsel from January 20, 2021 through April 2023.

Hoffer was tapped by governor-elect Maura Healey to become Massachusetts' Climate Chief, the first role of its kind in the United States, and moved into the role in April 2023. The same month, she launched the Youth Climate Council, a group of high school students who she would meet with on a regular basis to discuss environmental issues. One of her first actions as Chief was to establish the Massachusetts Community Climate Bank, the United States' first green bank "dedicated to affordable housing."

In October, she published a report with 39 recommendations for what the state can do to lower its environmental footprint and to be better equipped to fulfill the goals of the existing Massachusetts Clean Energy and Climate Plan for 2050, which aims to have the state be fully net zero. Among her recommendations were building more sustainable energy sources, preparing for extreme weather, and axing all carbon emissions by 2050. Among her more specific recommendations are Massport reducing the number of short haul flights; decarbonizing new public school construction; developing a Climate Service Corp to train "young people for jobs in clean energy and climate resilience;" and introducing a Comprehensive Coastal Resilience Plan to follow as climate change increasingly impacts coastal areas. Additionally, she calls for a restructuring of the Mass Save program, a utilities program currently overseen by utilities providers. She recommends adding additional administrators to the project to support cost savings rather than to entirely replace the providers.

== Personal life ==
In her spare time, Hoffer raises Nigerian Dwarf dairy goats on her farm in Barre.

== Awards and honors ==
- 2007 - Boston Bar Association President's Award
- 2007 - Outstanding Pro Bono Service Award from WilmerHale
- 2013 - Massachusetts Lawyers Weekly Women of Law Award
- 2020 - American College of Environmental Lawyers fellow
- 2020 - Meritorious Service Award from National Association of Attorneys General
- 2023 - National Walter Cronkite Award for Climate Education
