= Nađa Dizdarević =

Nađa Dizdarević (Bosnian, in Cyrillic: Нађа Диздаревић) is a Bosnian citizen. She is known for the efforts she made to draw the world's attention to the extrajudicial capture and detention of her husband, Hadj Boudella. Boudella was captured by American intelligence officials, and transported to detention in the US naval base at Guantánamo Bay, Cuba.

Dizdarević organized demonstrations, sit-ins, and hunger strikes, to draw public attention to her husband's case. Dizdarević collapsed and was hospitalized ending a hunger strike, on December 9, 2005.

On January 23, 2006, Dizdarević laid kidnapping charges against former prime minister Zlatko Lagumdžija, former Minister of the Interior Tomislav Limov, the warden of the prison where her husband and the others identified as the "Algerian Six" were held, and various other employees of the Interior Ministry.

On January 30, 2006, Dizdarević was interviewed by the German magazine Der Spiegel. In her interview, she asserted that her husband's lawyers could not inquire too closely about the conditions of his detention, or he would be punished. But she had been assured by other detainees, who had been released, that Guantánamo guards had regularly shown disrespect to the Qur'an. She also asserted, that the guards were routinely beating children in Camp Iguana.

Three children were detained at Camp Iguana, Asadullah Abdul Rahman, Muhammad Ismail Agha and Naqibullah. They were all sought out by journalists, following their release on January 29, 2004. While they did report highly abusive treatment and interrogation while they were at the Bagram Theater Internment Facility in Afghanistan, they were treated well, once they arrived in Cuba. They were allowed showers twice a day, were allowed to play soccer and video games, and were provided with schooling.

Approximately a dozen other minors were detained in Guantánamo, within the general prison population. And some of them reported, through their lawyers, the very harshest treatment.

The allegations of Qu'ran desecration and child abuse from Dizdarević's Der Spiegel interview were picked up and repeated by Qatar's Al Jazeera and Turkey's Kavkaz.

On November 20, 2008, US District Court Judge Richard Leon ruled, in Boumediene v. Bush, that the USA had no credible evidence to justify the detention of Boudella and four of the five other men. In telephone interviews Dizdarević called on Bosnian authorities to follow up with a demand that the men be immediately released:

“This is the victory of justice even though it comes after seven years of legal struggle.”

- “Bosnian authorities should now fulfil their obligation and officially demand their liberation.”

According to the Greek news agency Adnkronos Dizdarević planned to take the men's case to the European Court of Human Rights, Strasbourg herself, if Bosnian authorities didn't take prompt action.
