= Mohammed el Gharani =

Saudi-Chadian Guantanamo Bay detainee (born 1986)

- Born: 1986 (age 39–40); Medina, Saudi Arabia
- Detained at: Guantanamo
- Other names: Mohammad El Gharani; Muhammed Hamid al Qarani; Muhammad Hamid (Yousef Akbir Salih) al Qarani
- ISN: 269
- Charge: No charge (unlawfully detained)
- Status: Released after winning his habeas corpus

Mohammed el Gharani is a citizen of Chad and native of Saudi Arabia born in 1986, in Medina. He was one of the juveniles held for seven years at the Guantanamo Bay detention camp where they estimated his age to be 15–16, though Al Jazeera reports his age to have been 14 at the time of his arrest. Human Rights lawyer Clive Stafford Smith identified el Gharani as one of a dozen teenage boys held in the adult portion of the prison.

The Independent said el Gharani was accused of plotting with Abu Qatada, in London, in 1999 – when he was a 12-year-old, living with his parents, in Saudi Arabia. He was detained for seven years in the United States Guantanamo Bay detention camps.

On January 14, 2009, U.S. District Judge Richard J. Leon ordered the release of el Gharani because the evidence that he was an enemy combatant was mostly limited to statements from two other detainees whose credibility had been called into question by US government staff. El Gharani's attorney Zachary Katznelson said after the ruling "Judge Leon did justice today. This is an innocent kid when he was seized illegally in Pakistan and should never have been in prison in the first place."

== History ==
After his parents emigrated from Chad, Mohammed was born and grew up in Saudi Arabia. Here he was subjected to discrimination as a Chadian, and was denied schooling. Consequently, he went to Pakistan in order to study English and computer studies. It was in Pakistan that he was arrested by Pakistani police, and given over to US forces.

Following this, Mohammed was taken to the US run Bagram Air Force Base in Afghanistan. Here it is claimed that he was kept naked for days, and subjected to racial abuse. After being held in Bagram for two months, Mohammed was transferred to Guantanamo Bay where he remained for seven and a half years. Eventually, in 2009 with the help of Reprieve lawyers, Mohammed won a court order for his release. He was subsequently released and returned to Chad.

== Boston Globe investigations ==
On July 14, 2006, the Boston Globe reported on investigations they made to test the credibility of the allegations against Guantanamo detainees. El Gharani was one of the detainees whom they profiled.

The Globe reported that El Gharani was alleged to have been part of a cell, in London, led by Abu Qatada, c. 1998 – when he was 11 or 12 years old. According to the Globe:

Chito Peppler, a Pentagon spokesman, said the date referred to when 'Abu Qatada became active.' He maintained that it was possible that el Gharani had been a part of the cell before his arrest at 14.

El Gharani's lawyer, Clive Stafford Smith pointed out that El Gharani had never traveled to England.

Smith also offered an example of how allegations arose against El Gharani due to the DoD's lack of qualified translators. In El Gharani's dialect of Arabic, "zalati" means "tomato". In his translator's dialect of Arabic, "zalati" meant "money". His translator asked Al Gharani where he would go to get money, back home, and Al Gharani dutifully listed all the grocery stalls where he could buy tomatoes.

== Questioning over the June 10th 2006 suicides ==
The Department of Defense reported, on June 10, 2006, that three detainees committed suicide.

The camp commander, Admiral Harry Harris, called the suicides, "an act of asymmetrical warfare". One reaction of the camp authorities to the suicide was to seize all their papers, even their confidential communication with their lawyers. Leaks from the camp authorities fueled rumors that the camp authorities had reason to believe that detainee's lawyers had actively conspired with the detainees in arranging the suicides. The camp authorities claimed that one of the suicide notes was written on stationery that the camp authorities made available to detainee's lawyers.

The Washington Post reports that the lawyer on which camp authorities focused their suspicion is Clive Stafford Smith. Stafford Smith reports that his client Mohammed el Gharani, one of the youngest of the Guantanamo detainees, has been interrogated at length trying to establish a tie between him and the suicides. In a letter to the Associated Press Stafford Smith wrote:

The interrogator said I told my clients to kill themselves, and word was passed to the three men who did commit suicide.

According to the Seattle Post-Intelligencer, Stafford Smith claims: "...soldiers have threatened to move el-Gharani to Camp 5, a maximum-security facility, if he does not implicate Stafford Smith in the suicides.".

Historian Andy Worthington, reporting on April 25, 2008, in the Lebanon Daily Star, described torture el Gharani reports experiencing, including:

- sleep deprivation;
- having a cigarette extinguished on his body;
- having freezing cold water thrown on him;
- being suspended by his arms, with his feet hanging free from the floor, for extended periods of time;
- having a soldier hold his penis in his hand, hold a pair of scissors, and threaten to cut it off.

== Writ of habeas corpus ==
On January 14, 2009, US District Court Judge Richard Leon ordered el Gharani's released. Leon dismissed all the US allegations that el Gharani had been observed in Afghanistan, because there was no evidence to support them—other than denunciations from two other captives—captives whose credibility he questioned.

== First phone call ==
Muhammad el Gharani was allowed his first phone call on April 16, 2009. He phoned former captive, recently released Al Jazeera journalist Sami Al Hajj. He told Al Hajj that conditions had worsened after the election of United States President Barack Obama. El Gharani was returned to Chad less than two months after the call, on June 13, 2009.

== Return to Chad ==
On June 11, 2009, the Department of Justice reported that they had "repatriated" an Iraqi captive and a Chadian captive from Guantanamo to their home countries.

Andy Worthington, the author of The Guantanamo Files, reported that el Gharani was still not free after his return, as he was held by Chadian security forces, who described this detention as a formality.

Reuters reports that Commander Jeffrey Gordon continued to insist that el Gharani was older than he claimed.

The BBC reports that after his return to Chad, el Gharani has not been able to receive any official identity documents, because Chadian officials are not sure he is actually a citizen. They report that since el Gharani grew up in Saudi Arabia he is unable to speak to any other Chadians in their local language. Saudi Arabia had, as of 2009, refused to allow el Gharani to return and be united with his parents.

== Performance with Laurie Anderson ==
Avant Garde musician Laurie Anderson collaborated with el Gharani in a work entitled Habeas Corpus, based on his life. El Gharani can't travel to the United States, so his participation is via telepresence. Anderson praised el Gharani's extremely articulate description of his experience.

== Literature and Comic Book ==
Jérôme Tubiana published the story from el Gharani's point of view. This was adapted to a graphic novel drawn by Alexandre Franc under the title Guantánamo Kid. The comic is released in English, French and German (Dargaud) translation and endorsed by Amnesty International.

- Guantánamo Kid, the true story of Mohammed El-Gharani - Jérôme Tubiana & Alexandre Franc, SelfMadeHero 2019, ISBN 978 1 910593 66 0
