= Algerian Six =

Six Algerian-born Bosnian men held at Guantanamo Bay detention camp since 2002

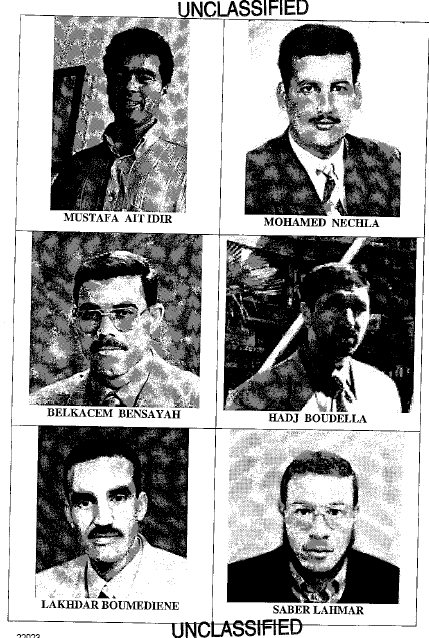
Algerian Six

The Algerian Six were six Algerian men, who gained citizenship of Bosnia and Herzegovina during the Bosnian War, five of whom will continue to hold a dual Algerian and Bosnian citizenship, and who were imprisoned without charges at Guantanamo Bay Naval Base in Guantanamo Bay, Cuba from January 2002.

After the men initially fell under U.S. suspicion, the government of Bosnia and Herzegovina arrested and tried them in 2001, but later released them for lack of evidence. Following these proceedings they were illegally turned over to US intelligence officials in January 2002 in Sarajevo and transported to Guantanamo, where they were detained there without charges by the US for the following years. The Bosnian authorities were formally condemned for their actions by the Human Rights Chamber for Bosnia and Herzegovina, the relevant Bosnian court at the time.
They later filed for habeas corpus in United States federal court and their case reached the United States Supreme Court in 2008. It ruled in Boumediene v. Bush that detainees and foreign nationals had rights to file for habeas corpus in federal courts. Following review of their cases, a US District Court judge ordered five of the men to be released based on insufficient evidence.
In 2009, the US released the men. Three were flown to Bosnia to reunite with their families under protective custody. The US refused to let Lakhdar Boumediene return to Bosnia while he feared returning to Algeria because of potential retaliation, so France offered to let him settle in Provence, where he was joined by his wife and children.
District judge Richard J. Leon recommended the continued detention of Bensayah Belkacem, but his attorneys appealed his case and in 2010, a three-judge panel of the United States court of appeals overturned Leon's decision. They determined that Belkacem was not a member of al Qaeda and should be released.

In late 2004, the six men had been sent before Combatant Status Review Tribunals (CSRTs) of three United States military officers. The CSRTs concluded that each of the six men was properly classified as an "enemy combatant" based on classified evidence. The CSRTs were criticized for applying a definition of "enemy combatant" that was so broad that it could include a "little old lady in Switzerland," who donated money to a charity in Afghanistan that, without her knowledge, funded al Qaeda.

Wolfgang Petritsch, a UN diplomat and the former High Representative for Bosnia and Herzegovina, said the US had threatened the UN to withdraw their men from the mission in 2002 if he protested against the transfer of the six men out of Bosnia at that time.

== The six ==
The six men were:

Bensayah Belkacem	U.S. alleged cell phone records show 70 calls to Afghanistan in the month following the attacks of September 11, 2001; U.S. claimed he had two forged passports; U.S. claimed he had a slip of paper with Abu Zubaydah's cell phone number on it; Married with two children
Hadj Boudella	Met monthly with Belkacem and local leaders of four other charities, to allegedly coordinate charitable activities, which U.S. argued were a front for meetings to discuss terrorist activities; Claims to have "aided orphans" with Human Appeal; Married with seven children
Lakhdar Boumediene	Worked in Sarajevo for the Red Crescent of United Arab Emirates; Married with two children; Boumediene v. Bush (2008) was a Supreme Court decision providing that detainees could have access to federal courts for habeas corpus.
Sabir Mahfouz Lahmar	Arabic studies scholar; Worked for the Saudi High Commission for Relief of Bosnia and Herzegovina; Married with two children born in Sarajevo
Mustafa Ait Idr	Allegedly repaired computers and provided technical support for the Taliban; Alleged beatings broke one of his fingers and left his face partially paralyzed.; Married with three children
Mohammed Nechle	Worked for the Red Crescent of the United Arab Emirates in Bihać, Bosnia; Married with two children

== Background ==
The U.S. Government alleged that the six native Algerian men living in Sarajevo, Bosnia-Herzegovina were associated with Abu Zubaydah and a plan to bomb the U.S. Embassy in Sarajevo. The United States chargé d'affaires reportedly told the prime minister of Bosnia that the U.S. would withdraw its personnel and cut diplomatic relations if Bosnia did not arrest and investigate the Algerian Six. The Algerian Six were arrested by Bosnian authorities within the week, were investigated fully, and tried for the alleged plot to bomb the U.S. and British embassies in Sarajevo. The Supreme Court of Bosnia released all six men for lack of evidence against them.

The Human Rights Chamber of the Bosnian Judiciary explicitly ruled that the government must take all steps to prevent forcible deportation of the men. But, upon being released from jail, they were handed over to U.S. military police and transported overseas to its Guantanamo Bay detention camp in Cuba.
Wolfgang Petritsch, the international community's top official in Bosnia at the time, recalls being told by Bosnian leaders that the U.S. applied a lot of pressure on Bosnia to be allowed to take the Algerian Six to Guantanamo. Petritsch also said that the US officials had threatened the UN and told him they would remove their support for an international mission he was heading if he decided to protest against Bosnia compliance with their request. According to documents filed by the detainee's American lawyers in their U.S. federal court habeas action, Christopher Hoh, the then U.S. chargé d'affaires, had told then Bosnian Federation Prime Minister Alija Behmen that the U.S. would cut all diplomatic relations if the men were not arrested.
Amnesty International recalled in 2002 that the Bosnian Supreme Court explicitly opposed this transfer of the men to US authorities.

The "Tipton Three", three British citizens detained in Guantanamo who were released in March 2004, wrote a 131-page account of their experiences. They wrote about the Algerian Six:

By Bosnians we mean six Algerians who were unlawfully taken from Bosnia to Guantanamo Bay. They told us how they had won their Court case in Bosnia. As they walked out of Court, Americans were there and grabbed them and took them to Camp X-Ray, January 20, 2002. They arrived five days after us. They were treated particularly badly. They were moved every two hours. They were kept naked in their cells. They were taken to interrogation for hours on end. They were short shackled for sometimes days on end. They were deprived of their sleep. They never got letters, nor books, nor reading materials. The Bosnians had the same interrogators for a while as we did and so we knew the names which were the same as ours and they were given a very hard time by those. They told us that the interrogators said if they didn't cooperate that they could ensure that something would happen to their families in Algeria and in Bosnia.

Following the capture of the six men by the United States, the Bosnian government argued for their release from Guantanamo Bay. The hearings at Combatant Status Review Tribunals (CSRTs) were held in 2004, and, as shown by transcripts from the Associated Press library of Guantanamo Bay detainee dossiers, four of the six men were telling their tribunal officers that interrogators did not believe that there had ever been any substance to the U.S. allegations that they had planned to bomb the U.S. embassy. Clive Stafford Smith, legal director of the organization Reprieve, which represents numerous detainees, wrote in The Guardian, that the CSRTs applied such a broad definition of "enemy combatant" that it could include a "little old lady in Switzerland," who donated money to a charity in Afghanistan that then, without her knowledge, funded al Qaeda. (See Transcript of Motion to Dismiss before United States District Court Judge Joyce Hens Green at pp. 25–26 (December 1, 2004) Rasul v. Bush, Docket No. 02-02999)

== Representation ==
Since July 2004, the firm of Wilmer Cutler Pickering Hale and Dorr has had a team working with the Center for Constitutional Rights in their suit against the federal government on behalf of the Algerian Six. In 2007, the team of Melissa Hoffer, Stephen Oleskey, Rob Kirsch, Mark C. Fleming, Lynne Campbell Soutter, Jeffrey Gleason, Lauren Brunswick, and Allyson Portney traveled to Guantanamo to offer further services to six detained men. Hoffer delivered a speech about their case at the 17th Concours International de Plaidoiries, where she said that during interviews they described their experience as having suffered horrific abuse at Guantanamo.

== USA drops allegation of bomb plot ==
In 2006, The Washington Post'' published a profile of the Algerian Six. The profile reported that during their Administrative Review Board hearings, the US officials dropped the earlier allegation that they had been plotting to bomb the US embassy in Sarajevo, and reported the speculation that the men continued to be held because the Bush administration was unwilling to admit it had held them for four years without substantial evidence.
According to the Washington Post, Guantanamo intelligence analysts said they continued to detain the men because of intelligence including the following:

- Mustafa Idr had taught karate to Bosnian orphans;
- another detainee, while still living in Algeria and performing compulsory military service, had served as an army cook;
- "Boudella was accused ... of joining bin Laden and Taliban fighters at Tora Bora, Afghanistan,... in December 2001", where as, The Washington Post noted, Boudella was, at the time, already locked up thousands of miles away in Sarajevo, after having been arrested in the later-discredited embassy plot;
- Boudella wore a ring "similar to those that identified the Red Rose Group members of Hamas", although Boudella's wife obtained an affidavit from the jeweler where the ring was purchased, explaining that style and design of ring is popular in Bosnia and unrelated to any group or organization symbol.

The Washington Post further writes that Bush administration negotiators tried to secure face-saving deals with Bosnia and Algeria, and noted according to the article:

- that "U.S. officials have pressed Algeria to take back the prisoners on the condition that they be confined or kept under surveillance there", and that "(s)o far, the Algerian government has balked";
- that "(s)enior Bosnian officials said they have been told by U.S. diplomats that the six Algerians will never be allowed to return to Bosnia, which had granted dual citizenship to most of the men before their seizure";
- that the then Bosnian Prime Minister, Adnan Terzić, requested US Secretary of State, Condoleezza Rice, arrange the return of the men in a letter dated February 2, 2005;
- that on March 17, 2005, Rice responded the men could not be freed because "they still possess important intelligence data", and that they still represented a threat to the USA;
- that "(t)hree months later, the State Department offered a somewhat different explanation (...), Matthew A. Reynolds, acting assistant secretary for legislative affairs, explained the Algerians could not be released in part because the Bosnian government 'has not indicated that it is prepared or willing to accept responsibility for them upon transfer'";
- and that "Justice Minister Slobodan Kovač said there would be no legal basis to place the men under arrest or surveillance if they were returned to Bosnia because they have already been exonerated there", quoting him as he stated, "'There is no case against them here in Bosnia, no criminal case,' he said".

The article also notes that, although the Bush administration had declined to discuss any evidence they may have against the men, Pentagon spokesman J. D. Gordon said:

There was no mistake in originally detaining these individuals as enemy combatants. Their detention was directly related to their combat activities as determined by an appropriate Defense Department official before they were ever transferred to Guantanamo."

== Boumediene v. Bush (2008) ==
In October 2008, the US Supreme Court in Boumediene v. Bush (2008) (under which Al Odah v. United States was consolidated), ruled that the detainees and other foreign nationals had the right to file habeas corpus suits in federal courts and were covered by habeas protections of the US constitution.
Following that decision, Judge Richard J. Leon of the Federal District Court in Washington DC ruled that the government had not provided sufficient evidence for detention and that all of the men except Bensayah Belkacem should be released. Leon ordered the release of five of the six men held at Guantanamo Bay, Cuba, and the continued detention of Belkacem.

The Court ruled:

To allow enemy combatancy to rest on so thin a reed would be inconsistent with this court's obligation; the court must and will grant their petitions and order their release. This is a unique case. Few if any others will be factually like it. Nobody should be lulled into a false sense that all of the ... cases will look like this one.

On March 3, 2009, El Khabar reported that, before the men were released, they had to sign documents that they would not sue the US government for their kidnapping in Bosnia.

Three of the six men were released and flown to Bosnia, leaving three in Guantanamo. Later in 2009 Boumediene was accepted by France, and Nechle went to Algeria.
