= Ali Abdul Motalib Awayd Hassan Al Tayeea =

Iraqi former Guantanamo Bay detainee

- Born: Baghdad, Iraq
- Detained at: Guantanamo
- ISN: 111
- Charge: No charge (held in extrajudicial detention)
- Status: Repatriated in January 2009

Ali Abdul Motalib Awayd Hassan Al Tayeea (Arabic: علي عبد المطلب عويد حسان الطائي) is a citizen of Iraq who was held in extrajudicial detention in the United States's Guantanamo Bay detention camps, in Cuba. His Guantanamo Internment Serial Number was 111. The Department of Defense reports that Al Tayeea was born in Baghdad, Iraq. The Department of Defense provided a birthday, or an estimated year of birth, for all but 22 of the 759 detainees. Al Tayeea is one of those 22. He was repatriated on January 17, 2009, after more than seven years without ever been charged.

== Press reports ==
When the Department of Defense first complied with US District Court Justice Jed Rakoff's court order and released the transcripts of the Guantanamo detainees, they weren't identified by name. However, a small number of the detainee's names were mentioned in the body of the transcripts. Al Tayeea's transcript was one that contained his name.

A widely republished story from the Associated Press described Al Tayeea as a mechanic who had been jailed by Saddam Hussein's regime.

An article in The Weekly Standard has extensive excerpts from the testimony Al Tayees offered during his Tribunal. He described a long history of emigration from country to country in the mid-east, that finally left him working, as a driver, for the Taliban, in Afghanistan.

The Weekly Standard reported that Al Tayeea's nickname in Guantanamo was "Pimp Daddy".

Al Tayeea said he met John Walker Lindh, "the American Taliban", who he describes as a "good guy" and a "jackass".

I don't believe in the Taliban, but being hungry and homeless, I worked there for 2½ months and traveled in an old Russian car called a Gas 66. There are many of these in Iraq; it's a bullshit car. Everyday there was a broken engine, so I requested the money to fix it. I put a little of the money in my pocket and I'd go fix it. I didn't want to go every day. The fucking Taliban is fucking my life.

The Weekly Standard reported that Al Tayeea didn't get along with the other Guantanamo detainees, and had bragged to his Tribunal about threatening to keep informing on the other detainees:

They call me motherfucker all the time and I say, "Fuck Osama Bin Laden and fuck the Taliban." I'm very happy and I tell them I'll stay here forever and give information about them. I tell them, "Fuck you, if you believe in Osama Bin Laden."

== Accused of leveling false allegations ==
Jawad Jabber Sadkhan had a statement from detainee 758 submitted as evidence at his Tribunal. In his statement detainee 758 identified himself as "Shaker Al Iraqi (Abass Abdou Erromi)". The official record identifies him as Abbas Habid Rumi Al Naely. He testified that he suspected the accusation against him and detainee 433 were the result of animosity from detainee 111, who he identified as "Ali Abdou Ahtaleb Al Iraqi" and detainee 252, who he identified as "Yassin Basro Al Yamani". The official record shows detainee 252 as Yasim Muhammed Basardah. Al Naely says he knew Sadkhan in Afghanistan, and he knew him as a good, peaceloving, family man. Al Naely said that the two men he identified as Sadkhan's accusers did not know him in Afghanistan, and their accusations were complete fabrications.

== Combatant Status Review ==
The Bush administration asserted that:

the protections of the Geneva Conventions did not extend to captured prisoners who are not members of the regular Afghan armed force nor meet the criteria for prisoner of war for voluntary forces.

Critics argued the Conventions obliged the U.S. to conduct competent tribunals to determine the status of prisoners. Subsequently, the U.S. Department of Defense instituted Combatant Status Review Tribunals (CSRTs), to determine whether detainees met the new definition of an "enemy combatant".

"Enemy combatant" was defined by the U.S. Department of Defense as:

an individual who was part of, or supporting, the Taliban, or al-Qaeda forces, or associated forces that are engaged in hostilities against the United States or its coalition partners. This includes any person who commits a belligerent act or has directly supported hostilities in aid of enemy armed forces.

The CSRTs are not bound by the rules of evidence that would normally apply in civilian court, and the government's evidence is presumed to be “genuine and accurate.” From July 2004 through March 2005, CSRTs were convened to determine whether each prisoner had been correctly classified as an "enemy combatant".

Ali Abdul Motalib Awayd Hassan Al Tayeea was among the 60% of prisoners who chose to participate in tribunal hearings. A Summary of Evidence memo was prepared for the tribunal of each detainee, listing the allegations that supported their detention as an "enemy combatant".

Ali Abdul Motalib Awayd Hassan Al Tayeea's memo accused him of the following:

a. The detainee is a member of the Taliban.
1. The detainee traveled from Iran to Pakistan in July 2001.
2. The detainee stayed at an Afghan training camp (al Ahrar) for three months.
3. The detainee was trained on basic soldiering skills at the camp.
4. The detainee stood guard duty at the camp with a rifle.
5. The detainee stayed at a Taliban house, in Kabul, Afghanistan.
6. Men arriving from the al Farouq training camp stayed at the Taliban house.
7. The detainee was a truck driver for the Republican Guard.
8. The detainee was a driver for the Taliban.

b. The detainee supported forces engaged in hostilities against the United States and its coalition partners.
1. The detainee was on the front lines with the Taliban, who were fighting against the Northern Alliance.
2. The detainee was on the front lines for two and a half months.
3. The detainee surrendered at Mazar-E Sharif [sic].

=== Administrative Review Board ===
Detainees whose Combatant Status Review Tribunal labeled them "enemy combatants" were scheduled for annual Administrative Review Board hearings. These hearings were designed to assess the threat a detainee might pose if released or transferred, and whether there were other factors that warranted his continued detention.

=== Summary of Evidence memo ===
A Summary of Evidence memo was prepared for Ali Abdul Motalib Awayd Hassan Al Payee's Administrative Review Board, on 16 August 2005. The memo listed factors for and against his continued detention.

=== Transcript ===
Al Tayeea chose to participate in his Administrative Review Board hearing.

=== Board recommendations ===
In early September 2007, the Department of Defense released two heavily redacted memos, from his Board, to Gordon R. England, the Designated Civilian Official. His Board's recommendation was unanimous. His Board's recommendation was redacted. England authorized his release or repatriation on December 19, 2005.

Under "Other factors" his Board wrote:

(U) ISN 052 described the EC as an Iraqi who converted to Christianity and back to Islam. The EC was given special privileges in Kandahar. The other detainees believe he spies for the U.S. (DMO-31).

== Repatriation ==
Six captives were repatriated in late January 2009, an Afghan captive named Bismullah, Hassan Mujamma Rabai Said, and four Iraqi captives: Hassan Abdul Said, Ali Al Tayeea, Abbas Al-Naely, and Arkan Al-Karim.
