= Trevor N. McFadden =

American judge (born 1978)

Trevor McFadden
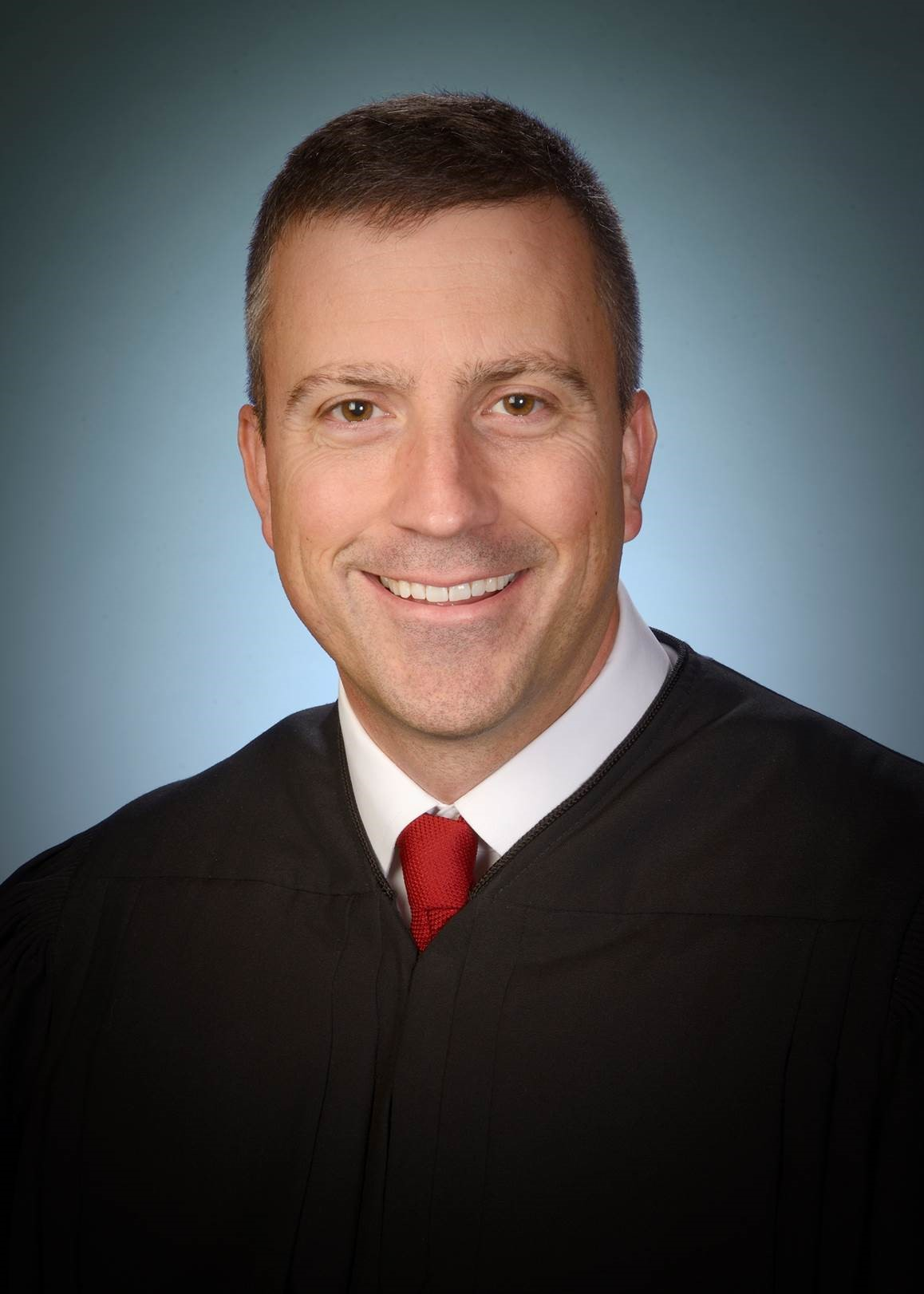
- Official portrait, 2019

Judge of the United States District Court for the District of Columbia
- Incumbent
- Assumed office October 31, 2017
- Appointed by: Donald Trump
- Preceded by: Richard J. Leon

Personal details
- Born: 1978 (age 47–48) Alexandria, Virginia, U.S.
- Education: Wheaton College (BA); University of Virginia (JD)

Trevor Neil McFadden (born 1978) is an American lawyer who serves as a United States district judge of the United States District Court for the District of Columbia. Previously, he was a deputy assistant attorney general in the Criminal Division of the Department of Justice.

== Early life and education ==
McFadden was born in 1978, in Arlington, Virginia. He graduated from Wheaton College in Wheaton, Illinois in 2001 with a Bachelor of Arts, magna cum laude. From 2001 to 2003, McFadden was a police officer in Fairfax County, Virginia. He then attended the University of Virginia School of Law, where he served on the editorial board of the Virginia Law Review. He graduated in 2006 with a Juris Doctor.

== Legal career ==
While in law school, McFadden was a summer associate at Gibson, Dunn & Crutcher in 2005 and 2006. After law school, McFadden was a law clerk to Judge Steven Colloton of the U.S. Court of Appeals for the Eighth Circuit from 2006 to 2007. He was a partner in the Compliance, Investigations & Government Enforcement Group in the Washington, D.C. office of Baker McKenzie, where he represented clients in white collar matters, including Foreign Corrupt Practices Act investigations, anti-money laundering compliance work and U.S. trade compliance matters.

Before becoming a judge, McFadden served as a deputy assistant attorney general in the Criminal Division of the Department of Justice. He has been a member of the Federalist Society since 2003.

=== Federal judicial service ===
On June 7, 2017, President Donald Trump nominated McFadden to serve as a United States District Judge of the United States District Court for the District of Columbia, to the seat vacated by Judge Richard J. Leon, who assumed senior status on December 31, 2016. A hearing on his nomination before the Senate Judiciary Committee was held on June 28, 2017. On July 20, 2017, his nomination was reported out of committee by a voice vote. On October 26, 2017, the United States Senate invoked cloture on his nomination by an 85–12 vote. On October 30, 2017, his nomination was confirmed by an 84–10 vote. He received his judicial commission on October 31, 2017.

=== Prominent decisions ===
==== Border wall ====
In April 2019, the U.S. House of Representatives requested that McFadden issue a preliminary injunction against the Trump administration's plan to divert about $6 billion from military construction and counter-drug appropriations to build a wall along the U.S.–Mexico border, arguing that the Trump administration's action violated the Constitution's Appropriations Clause. In June 2019, McFadden ruled that the House lacked standing to challenge the administration's diversion of funding and therefore dismissed the suit for lack of jurisdiction. This ruling contradicted the 2015 ruling of the U.S. District Court for the District of Columbia in U.S. House of Representatives v. Azar, in which the court found that then-Republican-controlled House of Representatives had standing in a lawsuit against President Obama's Affordable Care Act. In September 2020, the U.S. Court of Appeals for the D.C. Circuit overturned McFadden's decision and reinstated the House's lawsuit. Citing the McGahn case, the appellate court held that a single chamber of Congress has "standing to pursue litigation against the Executive for injury to its legislative rights"; the court also criticized the Trump administration's argument that "the Executive Branch can freely spend Treasury funds as it wishes unless and until a veto-proof majority of both houses of Congress forbids it" as a position that "turns the constitutional order upside down."

==== Trump tax returns ====
In December 2021, McFadden dismissed Committee on Ways & Means v. U.S. Department of the Treasury and Trump, a suit brought before him in July 2019 in which the Committee sought the tax returns of then-president Trump. McFadden ruled that Trump was "wrong on the law" and that Congress is due "great deference" in its inquiries, allowing the tax returns to be released to the Committee. He granted a 14-day delay in the release of the returns to allow the parties to negotiate terms of the release, or for Trump to appeal to the DC Circuit Court of Appeals.

==== Steele dossier ====
McFadden was assigned to rule on a subpoena hearing in a case regarding a Russian businessman named in the Steele dossier who sued BuzzFeed News for libel for publishing the dossier. Fusion GPS, the research firm which had commissioned the dossier and to whom the subpoenas have been issued, requested that McFadden step down from the case for potential conflict of interest. Fusion GPS alleges that McFadden's connections to Trump—a $1,000 donation to Trump's 2016 campaign, some volunteer work performed by McFadden on Trump's transition team vetting potential Cabinet nominees, and the fact that Trump nominated McFadden to the bench—are grounds for dismissal. McFadden denied the recusal request. McFadden wrote that he has little to no actual connection to the President, who is not a party to the lawsuit but has political interest in the suit, and has never even met the President. McFadden ruled "The President's connection with me and his interest in this case are simply too tenuous to cause a reasonable observer to question my impartiality." Hofstra University law professor James Sample, an authority on the subject of recusal, said that while he found some of the McFadden's contentions "curious," recusal did not appear to be required.

==== January 6 Capitol attack ====
In February 2021, McFadden received widespread media attention when he approved an uncontested travel request by Jenny Cudd, who faced two misdemeanor charges in connection with the 2021 storming of the United States Capitol and wanted to travel to Mexico for a "weekend retreat with her employees". Subsequent to Cudd's filing of her travel request, she was indicted on five federal counts, including one felony, relating to her alleged activities during the January 6, 2021, storming of the United States Capitol. Following Cudd's conviction, Judge McFadden removed weapons restrictions from her probation conditions, agreeing it was not "reasonably related" to her crime and she may need a firearm for own self-defense in the face of harassment she had endured following her conviction.

McFadden also received national media attention for suggesting that the January 6 Capitol rioters were being treated more harshly than the rioters in the 2020 Black Lives Matter protests. "The US Attorney's Office would have more credibility if it was even-handed in its concern about riots and mobs in the city," said McFadden during sentencing for one of the Capitol rioters. He later became the first judge to issue an outright acquittal of an accused January 6 rioter who had breached the Capitol grounds, concluding that the defendant "reasonably believed the [Capitol police] officers allowed him into the Capitol." McFadden sentenced another January 6 protester to 52 months imprisonment for having seized a police baton from an officer and used it to strike two other officers.

==== Vaccination ====
In March 2022, Judge McFadden blocked a DC rule which would allow minors to elect to be vaccinated without parental consent, concluding that it violated the parents' religious liberty. In his opinion, Judge McFadden described the minors involved in the case as behaving in "classic teenager fashion" by seeking to be vaccinated notwithstanding their parents' disapproval.

==== AP given reduced special access to Trump ====
In February 2025, McFadden declined to grant an emergency order reversing the Trump administration's reduced access imposed upon The Associated Press reporters at White House special access news events; the administration had reduced AP staff access after a number of disputes including the organization's refusal to use "Gulf of America" in its stylebook. Previously a private, news agency-controlled group known as the White House press corps informally self-regulated the access to the President including in the Oval Office and Air Force One, though this group did not include new Social Media. In April 2025, as the lawsuit continued, McFadden ordered the White House to restore the AP's access, citing First Amendment protections.

== Personal life ==
McFadden attends services at The Falls Church Anglican Church of Falls Church, Virginia, formerly a congregation of the Episcopal Diocese of Virginia. McFadden's church membership was brought up by Senator Sheldon Whitehouse during McFadden's U.S. Senate confirmation hearing on his nomination to the federal district court; asked whether he would, "despite his church’s beliefs", uphold the Supreme Court’s decision allowing same-sex marriage, McFadden responded, "he would", and received Whitehouse's confirmation vote.

Legal offices
Preceded by Richard J. Leon	Judge of the United States District Court for the District of Columbia; 2017–present	Incumbent
