= Sabir Mahfouz Lahmar =

Bosnian citizen (born 1969)

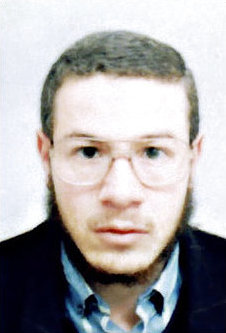
- Sabir Mahfouz Lahmar from his OARDEC dossier
- Born: May 22, 1969 (age 57); Constantine, Algeria
- Detained at: Guantanamo
- ISN: 10002
- Status: Won his habeas corpus after 8 years, released to France
- Occupation: Clergyman

Sabir Mahfouz Lahmar (born May 22, 1969) is a Bosnian-French citizen, who won his habeas corpus petition in United States federal court after being held for eight years and eight months in the military Guantanamo Bay detainment camps, in Cuba.

Sabir Mahfouz Lahmar was captured in Bosnia and Herzegovina in January 2002, after being cleared of suspicion by the Bosnian Supreme Court, and arrived in Guantanamo on January 21, 2002. In 2009, he was released from Guantanamo after France agreed to accept him. He was transported there on November 30, 2009, and lives in Bordeaux.

== Life before arrest ==
Sabir Mahfouz Lahmar was born and raised in an Islamic family in Constantine, Algeria. He graduated from the Islamic University of Madinah.

Lahmar worked for the Saudi High Commission for Relief of Bosnia and Herzegovina, an aid organisation shut down in October 2001 for alleged support of Islamist terrorism.

== Combatant Status Review ==
Lahmar was among the 60% of prisoners who chose to participate in tribunal hearings. A Summary of Evidence memo was prepared for the tribunal of each detainee.

Lahmar's memo accused him of the following:

a. The detainee is associated with al Qaida:
1. The detainee is associated with a known al Qaida facilitator.
2. Bensayah Belkecem, alias Mejd is the apparent leader of the Bosnian Algerian cell and has a direct link to Usama Bin Laden.
3. Bensayah Belkecem made phone calls to Abu Zubaydah, a senior aide to Usama Bin Laden, who was in charge of screening recruits for al Qaida training camps in Afghanistan.
4. The detainee and Bensayah Belkecem were arrested on suspicion of being linked with international terrorism.
5. The detainee had charges filed against him by the Bosnia-Herzegovina govt for International Terrorism.
6. The detainee was arrested in October 01 under suspicion of planning to attack the American Embassy in Sarajevo, Bosnia-Herzegovina.
7. The detainee advocated attacking U.S. forces and supported the Fatwa issued by Usama Bin Laden.
8. The detainee is a member of the Algerian Armed Islamic Group and attempted to assume leadership in the organization in November 2000.
9. The Algerian Armed Islamic Group is listed as a terrorist organization in the United States Department of Homeland Security Terrorist Organization Reference Guide.
10. The detainee applied for a visa in Sarajevo for travel to Afghanistan on 27 September 2001.
11. The detainee was jailed in late 1997, for robbing a U.S. Citizen.

=== Administrative Review Board ===
Detainees whose Combatant Status Review Tribunal labeled them "enemy combatants" were scheduled for annual Administrative Review Board hearings. These hearings were designed to assess the threat a detainee might pose if released or transferred, and whether there were other factors that warranted his continued detention.

Lahmar chose to participate in his Administrative Review Board hearing.

== Habeas corpus and release ==
Lahmar was one of six Algerian nationals whose petitions for habeas corpus reached the United States Supreme Court. In 2008 it ruled on them together under Boumediene v. Bush, deciding that detainees and foreign nationals were covered by constitutional protections allowing them to sue for habeas corpus. The Bush administration had contended that detainees at Guantanamo had no rights under the constitution. The cases were referred to US District Court for review.

US District Court Judge Richard Leon ruled in September 2008 on Saber's habeas corpus petition. He concluded that there was no evidence to support classifying him as an "enemy combatant", and that he should be released. He made the same ruling for four other Bosnians of Algerian descent.

Lahmar was transferred to French territory for release on November 30, 2009. Noting that Lahmar would "finally begin to live a normal life again", the French foreign ministry pledged to help re-integrate him into society. In its coverage of his release the Washington Post noted that Leon's September 2008 ruling had ordered his release "forthwith".

Three other men were transferred when Lahmar was released. A Palestinian captive was transferred to Hungary. His name was not released, and authorities did not report whether he was being detained in Hungarian custody or set free. Two Tunisian captives, Adel Ben Mabrouk, and Mohamed Ben Riadh Nasri, were transferred to the custody of Italy.

== Later life ==
Lahmar was arrested in Bordeaux in May 2017. He was suspected to be a member of an alleged ISIL recruiting network.
