= Bensayah Belkacem =

Algerian-Bosnian formerly detained at Guantanamo Bay detention camp from 2002 to 2013

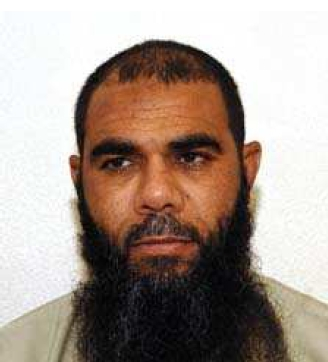
- JTF-GTMO official photo of Bensayah Belkacem.
- Born: September 10, 1962 (age 64); Ouargla, Algeria
- Detained at: Guantanamo
- ISN: 10001
- Charge: no charge
- Status: repatriated
- Occupation: clergyman

Bensayah Belkacem (born September 10, 1962) is a citizen of Bosnia, previously held in the United States Guantanamo Bay detainment camps, in Cuba. Born in Algeria, he was arrested in his home in Bosnia, on October 8, 2001, shortly after the attacks of September 11, 2001.

Bensayah Belkacem arrived at the Guantanamo detention camps on January 21, 2002, and was held there for 11 years, 10 months and 14 days. In October 2008, his case was heard by the US District Court for the District of Columbia, which recommended his continued detention. This was later overturned on appeal.

Belkacem and five other men, native-born Algerians who were charity workers and colleagues of his, were arrested on suspicion of plotting to bomb the American embassy in Bosnia. They are known as the Algerian Six. The other five men were released in 2009. This followed the Supreme Court decision in Boumediene v. Bush (2008) that said the military commissions were unconstitutional and provided for detainees to have their habeas corpus petitions heard by the US federal civilian court. After reviewing their cases, US District Court Judge Richard J. Leon ruled each of the five was being held illegally, but he ordered the continued detention of Belkacem.

His decision was appealed to the Court of Appeals for the District of Columbia. On June 28, 2010, a three-judge panel reversed Leon's ruling, holding that Belkacem could not be considered a member of al-Qaeda. The Justice Department said it would respond.

On December 5, 2013, U.S. Department of Defense released a statement saying that Belkacem had been returned to Algeria.

== Background ==
American intelligence officials had grown alarmed by an increase in the "chatter" in terrorist networks. After Belkacem's extrajudicial capture, news media reported that a search of his home turned up pro-jihadist material.

He was eventually "accused of helping people who wanted to travel to Afghanistan and join Al Qaeda". He was transported January 21, 2002, to the Guantanamo detention camp and was there until late 2013.

== Detention in Cuba ==
Bensayah was one of the first Guantanamo detainees to get a letter out describing the conditions there. In a letter his wife received in June 2002, he said that the detainees no longer had to defecate and urinate into plastic bags. The camp authorities had finally provided them with toilets.

== Writ of habeas corpus ==
A writ of habeas corpus was submitted on behalf of the Algerian Six, including Bensayah Belkacem. On October 12, 2004, the Department of Defense released 40 pages of unclassified documents related to Belkacem's Combatant Status Review Tribunal.

== Continued detention ==
On October 21, 2008, US District Court Judge Richard J. Leon ordered the release of five of the Algerians held at Guantanamo Bay, Cuba, following the US Supreme Court ruling in Boumediene v. Bush (2008) and based on his review of their cases. He ordered the continued detention of Belkacem.

=== Appeal of Judge Leon's ruling ===
On September 15, 2009, a three-judge panel from the DC Circuit Court of Appeals started to review Leon's ruling on Belkacem. The panel ruled that their hearings would be held entirely in-camera.

According to The Blog of Legal Times, a partially declassified brief to the appeal court by one of Belkacem's lawyers, of Wilmer Cutler Pickering Hale and Dorr, had challenged Leon's reasoning because he had relied on "unfinished, conclusory intelligence reports and uncorroborated assertions from anonymous sources." Fleming's brief had challenged Leon's ruling because he had not required the government to search for exculpatory evidence related to Belkacem. Fleming asserted that when the government had conducted its search, the classified evidence it provided to him in April 2009 eroded the government's allegations.

On June 28, 2010, the panel reversed Leon's ruling, holding that Belkacem could not be considered a member of al-Qaeda. Judge Douglas H. Ginsburg, writing for the panel, said that the U.S. Government had presented "no direct evidence of actual communication between Bensayah and any al-Qaeda member". Ginsburg noted that attorneys for the Obama administration had backed away from several arguments the Bush administration had previously made to Leon, including claims that Belkacem had communicated with Abu Zubaydah.

According to The New York Times, "Still, Judge Ginsburg's opinion suggested that the appeals court ruling turned less on the recategorization of Mr. Bensayah's alleged ties to al-Qaeda than on skepticism about the basic credibility of the evidence the government presented against him." As a result, the panel ordered the release of Belkacem. The Justice Department said it would respond.

== Release ==
On December 5, 2013, U.S. Department of Defense announced that Belkacem had been transferred from the detention facility at Guantanamo Bay to the Government of Algeria.

It was reported in the media that Belkacem opposed being returned to Algeria, citing fear for being targeted by militants.
