= Jawad Jabbar Sadkhan Al-Sahlani =

Iraqi former Guantanamo Bay detainee

- Sadkhan in Guantánamo detention
- Born: 1967 (age 58–59); Basra, Iraq
- Known for: Former Guantánamo detainee (ISN 433)

Jawad Jabbar Sadkhan Al-Sahlani (also recorded as Jawad Jabber Sadkhan and Jowad Jaber; born 1967) is an Iraqi man who was held without charge at the United States' Guantánamo Bay detention camp in Cuba from May 2002 until June 2009. His Guantanamo internment serial number was 433.

U.S. officials alleged that Sadkhan had served as a Taliban commander and intelligence official in northern Afghanistan. He denied the allegations, saying that he was a Shiite refugee who had fled Saddam Hussein's government and that other detainees had made false accusations against him. A 2009 federal court opinion noted recantations and credibility problems in the accounts of detainees who implicated him. The Guantanamo Review Task Force approved his transfer in 2009, and he was transferred to Iraqi government custody in June of that year.

== Background and capture ==
Sadkhan's lawyers said that he and his family fled Iraq in 1996 because they feared persecution under Saddam Hussein. They sought refuge in Iran and Pakistan and applied for asylum with the United Nations High Commissioner for Refugees in 1998.

According to his lawyers and his tribunal account, the family could not obtain asylum and tried to return to Iran, but guides left them stranded in Afghanistan. Sadkhan said they eventually settled near Mazar-i-Sharif, where he worked as a taxi driver and mechanic and occasionally sold fuel.

Sadkhan said Afghan forces arrested him and transferred him to U.S. custody in January 2002 after he could not pay a bribe. His lawyers said he was handed over for a ransom. He was transferred to Guantánamo on May 3, 2002.

== Guantánamo detention ==
=== Allegations and Sadkhan's response ===
A summary prepared for his Combatant Status Review Tribunal (CSRT) alleged that Sadkhan was a Taliban group commander, recruited and conscripted fighters, and served as the Taliban's director of intelligence and chief interrogator in Mazar-i-Sharif. A later military assessment, dated March 14, 2008, and summarized by The Telegraph, described him as an Iraqi intelligence officer and a senior Taliban intelligence official. It repeated allegations that he had interrogated prisoners and recruited for the Taliban, and added allegations that he had links to Al-Qaeda, provided logistical support, and participated in drug trafficking. The assessment rated him as a high risk to the United States and its allies and of medium intelligence value, and recommended continued detention.

Sadkhan denied working for the Taliban. He said that he had repaired vehicles for a representative of Abdul Rashid Dostum's Northern Alliance and had identified Taliban locations after the U.S.-led invasion. He attributed the accusations to disputes with other detainees and anti-Shiite hostility. His lawyers also emphasized that he was an Arabic-speaking Shiite, while describing the Taliban as predominantly Pashto-speaking and Sunni.

=== Review proceedings ===
Sadkhan participated in his CSRT, which confirmed his enemy-combatant designation on December 3, 2004. He requested testimony from three witnesses outside Guantánamo and documents from an Afghan police station and the United Nations. The tribunal president said that requests sent through the State Department received no response, and the witnesses were ruled unavailable.

Another Iraqi detainee, Abbas Habid Rumi al-Naely, submitted a statement during the review process describing Sadkhan as a peaceful family man. He attributed the accusations to animosity involving Ali al-Tayeea and Yasim Muhammed Basardah, whom he said had not known Sadkhan in Afghanistan.

== Habeas corpus proceedings ==
Sadkhan challenged his detention in the United States District Court for the District of Columbia in a case docketed as Civil Action No. 05-1487. After the Supreme Court's 2008 decision in Boumediene v. Bush confirmed that Guantánamo detainees could pursue habeas corpus petitions in federal court, his case continued before Judge Rosemary M. Collyer.

In an April 1, 2009, discovery opinion, Collyer wrote that the government had identified nine detainees who provided information about Sadkhan's activities and that the record contained "numerous recantations and credibility issues" concerning them. She ordered the government to tell his lawyers whether anyone had been paid for turning him over and to conduct a reasonable search for a release recommendation by Major General Geoffrey D. Miller. The opinion also noted that Miller and Colonel Brittain Mallow had recommended Sadkhan's release in 2003 or 2004, and that a November 2007 Administrative Review Board report had credited Sadkhan rather than other detainee testimony about his alleged activities overseas. The opinion concerned discovery and did not decide whether his detention was lawful.

== Transfer to Iraq ==
The Department of Justice announced on June 11, 2009, that Sadkhan had been transferred to Iraq under arrangements between the two governments after the Guantanamo Review Task Force approved his transfer.

His lawyers said the transfer occurred while they were preparing for a habeas corpus hearing scheduled for June 18 before Collyer. Jeffrey Colman said he had learned on May 15 that the task force had cleared Sadkhan for release. Sadkhan was transferred to Iraqi government custody, and his lawyers said they hoped he would soon be released and reunited with his family.
