= Yasim Muhammed Basardah =

Yemeni Guantanamo detainee

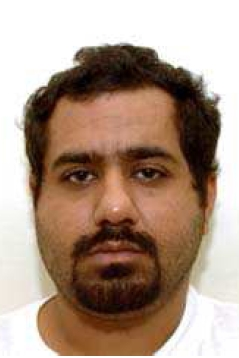
- Detained at: Guantanamo
- ISN: 252
- Charge: extrajudicial detention
- Status: Transferred to Spain on 4 May 2010

Yasim Muhammed Basardah is a citizen of Yemen who was detained in the United States's Guantanamo Bay detention camps, in Cuba. His Guantanamo Internment Serial Number is 252. Basardah was an informant for the interrogators in Guantanamo where he was rewarded with his own cell, McDonald's apple pies, chewing tobacco, a truck magazine and other "comfort items".

== Habeas corpus appeal, and appeal under the Detainee Treatment Act ==
Yasim Muhammed Basardah had a habeas corpus petition filed on his behalf. In September 2007, the Department of Justice published dossiers of unclassified documents arising from the Combatant Status Review Tribunals of 179 captives. His documents were not among those the Department of Defense published.

=== The Detainee Treatment Act and Military Commissions Act ===
The United States Congress passed the Detainee Treatment Act of 2005 and the Military Commissions Act of 2006. Both these Acts included provisions to close off Guantanamo captives' ability to file habeas corpus petitions.

The Detainee Treatment Act included a provision to proscribe Guantanamo captives who had not already initiated a habeas corpus petition from initiating new habeas corpus petitions. The Act included provision for an alternate, more limited form of appeal for captives. Captives were allowed to submit limited appeals to panels of three judges in a Washington DC appeals court. The appeals were limited, they could not be based on general principles of human rights. They could only be based on arguments that their Combatant Status Review Tribunal had not followed the rules laid out for the operation of Combatant Status Review Tribunals.

Nine months later Congress passed the Military Commissions Act. This Act contained provision to close off all the remaining outstanding habeas corpus petitions. After the closure of the habeas corpus petitions some Guantanamo captives had appeals in the Washington DC court submitted on their behalf, as described in the Detainee Treatment Act.

The DTA appeals progressed very slowly. Initially the Department of Justice argued that the captive's lawyers, and the judges on the panel, needed consider no more evidence than the "Summary of Evidence memos" prepared for the captives' CSR Tribunals. By September 2007, the Washington DC court ruled that the evidence that formed the basis of the summaries had to be made available.

The Administration then argued that it was not possible to present the evidence the Tribunals considered in 2004—because the evidence had not been preserved.

Only one captive, a Uyghur captive named Hufaiza Parhat, had his DTA appeal run to completion. On June 20, 2008, his three judge panel concluded that his Tribunal had erred and that he never should have been confirmed as an enemy combatant.

=== Boumediene v. Bush ===
On 12 June 2008, the United States Supreme Court ruled, in Boumediene v. Bush, that the Military Commissions Act could not remove the right for Guantanamo captives to access the US Federal Court system. Further, per the ruling, all previous Guantanamo captives' habeas petitions were eligible to be re-instated. The judges considering the captives' habeas petitions would be considering whether the evidence used to compile the allegations the men and boys were enemy combatants justified a classification of "enemy combatant".

=== Basardah's appeal under the DTA ===
Basardah's appeal under the DTA was suspended by the panel of the U.S. Court of Appeals for the D.C. Circuit examining his case. On 5 November 2008, the panel suspended his appeal on jurisdictional grounds. The panel wrote that when Congress passed the Detainee Treatment Act, stripping captives of the right to habeas corpus, they didn't anticipate that the Supreme Court would restore it, and that it was a mistake to proceed on two separate mechanisms for proceeding towards the same end.

Lyle Denniston, writing in Scotusblog, commented that this ruling implied that DTA appeals were closed for all future petitioners. He speculated that the other 190 outstanding DTA appeals would regard it as a precedent. Denniston wrote that Basardah had been waiting for his DTA appeal, 07-cv-1192, to be heard since June 2007.

== Asylum in Spain ==
On 19 May 2010, historian Andy Worthington, author of The Guantanamo Files, reported that Saba News was reporting Yasin had been transferred to Spain.
