= List of Iraqi detainees at Guantanamo Bay =

There were initially 16 Iraqi detainees in Guantanamo.

In 2005, nine Iraqi citizens were held in the United States's Guantanamo Bay detention camps, in Cuba. Eight of them have been repatriated, four as late as 2009. As of January 6, 2025, 15 detainees remain at Guantanamo Bay. Among them Abdul Hadi al Iraqi is the last Iraqi citizen in Guantanamo.

| isn | name | arrival date | departure date | notes |
|---|---|---|---|---|
| 111 | Ali Abdul Motalib Awayd Hassan Al Tayeea | 2002-05-03 | 2009-01-17 | Guards nicknamed him "Pimp Daddy". |
| 433 | Jawad Jabber Sadkhan | 2002-05-03 | 2009-06-10 | |
| 435 | Hassan Abdul Said | 2002-05-05 | 2009-01-17 | |
| 563 | Sohab Masud Mohammed | 2002-05-05 | 2004-03-31 | |
| 648 | Haydar Jabbar Hafez Al Tamimi | | 2004-03-31 | |
| 653 | Arkan Mohammad Ghafil Al Karim | 2002-06-08 | 2009-01-17 | |
| 758 | Abbas Habid Rumi Al Naely | 2002-08-05 | 2009-01-17 | |
| 906 | Bisher Amin Khalil Al Rawi | 2003-02-07 | 2007-03-30 | Refugee with residency permission in the United Kingdom.; Capture in Gambia followed a denunciation by British intelligence, who had employed him as an informant against Abu Qatada.; Released on April 3, 2007. |
| 10026 | Abdul Hadi al Iraqi | 2007-04-27 | | Previously held in CIA custody |
