= WilmerHale =

American multinational law firm

Wilmer Cutler Pickering Hale and Dorr LLP
- Headquarters: Washington, D.C. and Boston, Massachusetts
- No. of offices: 12
- No. of attorneys: 1,201 (2025)
- No. of employees: 2,363 (2025)
- Major practice areas: General Practice
- Key people: Anjan Sahni (Managing Partner)
- Revenue: US$1.60 billion (2024)
- Profit per equity partner: US$3.27 million (2024)
- Date founded: Boston, Massachusetts (1918); Washington, D.C. (1962)
- Founder: Multiple
- Company type: Limited liability partnership
- Website: wilmerhale.com

Wilmer Cutler Pickering Hale and Dorr LLP, also known as WilmerHale, is an American multinational law firm with offices in the United States and Europe. Co-headquartered in Washington, D.C., and Boston, it was formed in 2004 through the merger of the Boston-based firm Hale and Dorr and the D.C.-based firm Wilmer Cutler & Pickering. It employs more than 1,000 attorneys worldwide.

== History ==
=== Hale and Dorr, 1918–2004 ===
Hale and Dorr was founded in Boston in 1918 by Richard Hale, Dudley Huntington Dorr, Frank Grinnell, Roger Swaim, and John Maguire. On January 1, 1919, the partnership was reconstituted to admit George W. Wightman and Reginald Heber Smith. Smith, author of the seminal work Justice and the Poor and a pioneer in the American legal aid movement, joined the firm in 1919 and served as managing partner for thirty years. Hale and Dorr gained national recognition in 1954 when partner Joseph Welch, assisted by associate James St. Clair and John Kimball Jr., represented the U.S. Army on a pro bono basis during the historic Army-McCarthy hearings. In 1974, James D. St. Clair represented President Richard Nixon before the Supreme Court of the United States in United States v. Nixon. In 1988, partner Paul Brountas chaired the presidential campaign of Massachusetts Governor Michael Dukakis, and in 1990, senior partner William Weld was elected governor. The firm has had a long relationship with nearby Harvard Law School, home of the WilmerHale Legal Services Center.

=== Wilmer, Cutler & Pickering, 1962–2004 ===
Wilmer, Cutler & Pickering was founded in Washington in 1962 by former Cravath attorneys Lloyd Cutler and John Pickering, along with a senior lawyer, Richard H. Wilmer. Cutler, who later served as White House Counsel to Presidents Jimmy Carter and Bill Clinton, founded the Lawyers' Committee for Civil Rights Under Law in 1962 and served on its executive committee until 1987.

In the 1980s, Cutler led the founding of the Southern Africa Legal Services and Legal Education Project, to aid South African lawyers who fought to implement the rule of law during apartheid. From 1981 to 1993, partner C. Boyden Gray, a prominent member of The Federalist Society, left the firm to serve as White House Counsel to Vice President and President George H. W. Bush. In 2003, partner Jamie Gorelick began serving as a member of the 9/11 Commission.

=== Wilmer Cutler Pickering Hale and Dorr, since 2004 ===
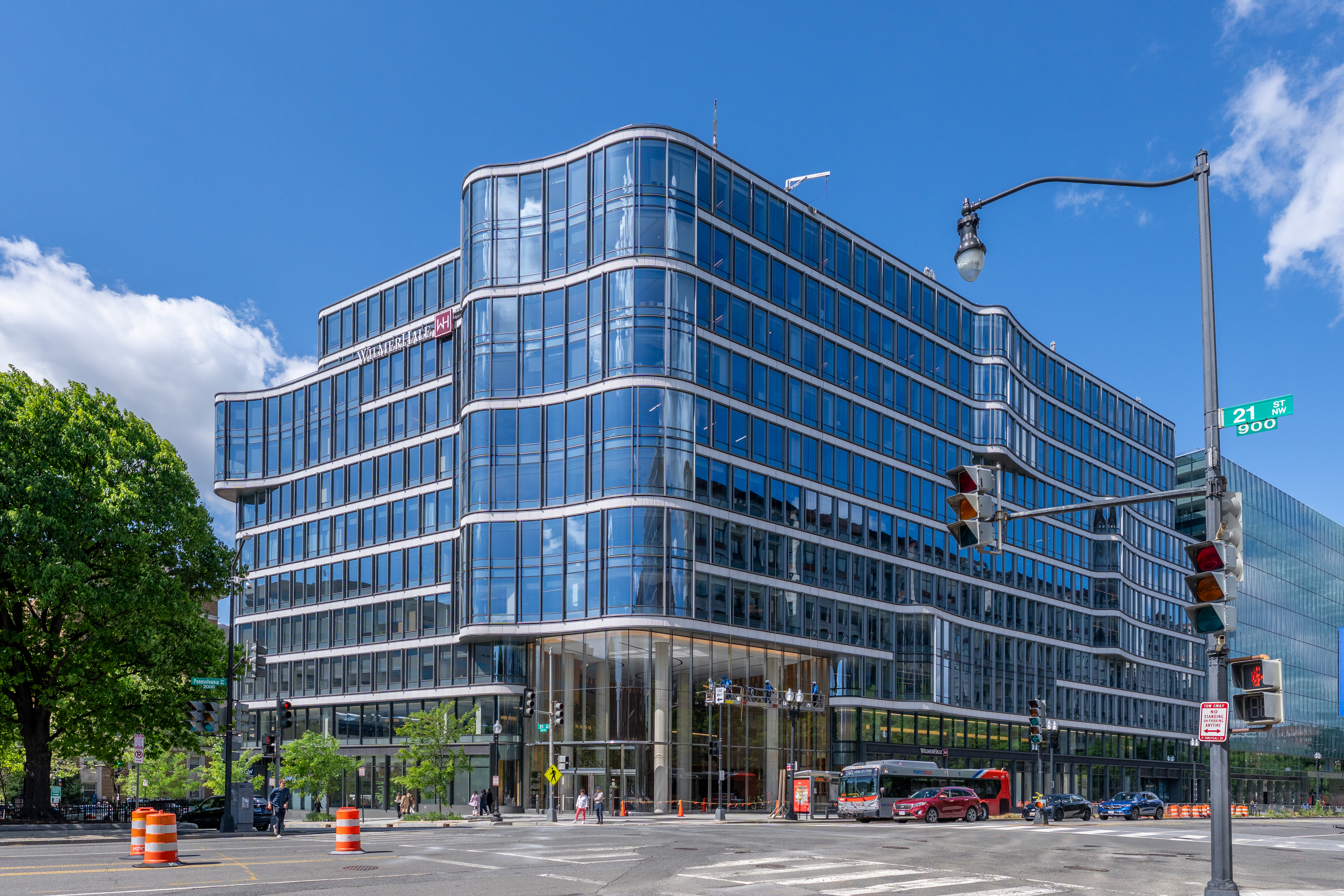
WilmerHale’s co-headquarters in Foggy Bottom, Washington, D.C.

Wilmer Cutler Pickering and Hale & Dorr merged, forming Wilmer Cutler Pickering Hale and Dorr in 2004, with dual headquarters in Boston and Washington.

In 2010, the law firm relocated its administrative support base to a new campus in Dayton, Ohio. The office houses more than 200 employees from existing WilmerHale offices and new employees from the Dayton area. Individuals in the Business Services Center include administrative support staff, bringing together services such as finance, human resources, information technology services, operations, document review and management, and practice management, which will provide improved efficiencies for administrative teams and the firm, and reduce significant operational expenses.

In June 2023, the firm announced that practice lawyer and former federal prosecutor Anjan Sahni was elected to succeed co-managing partners Robert Novick and Susan Murley, in January 2024.

The firm closed its Beijing office in China after 20 years in November 2024, with operations fully ceased in early 2025.

=== Targeting by the second Trump administration ===
On March 27, 2025, President Donald Trump signed an executive order taking action against the firm over its ties to Robert Mueller, former special counsel, who led a probe into Trump's 2016 campaign and its alleged ties with Russian state officials. The executive order directs federal agencies to end contracts with WilmerHale's clients, revokes their lawyers' security clearances and restricts their access to certain government buildings. The following day, Paul Clement of Clement & Murphy filed a lawsuit seeking to bar the executive order. Later that day, U.S. District Judge Richard J. Leon issued a temporary restraining order blocking a portion of the order, but did not block the provision ending WilmerHale’s lawyers' security clearances. On May 27, 2025, Judge Leon struck down the executive order, calling the order “unconstitutional.”

== Recognition ==
The Washington Post ranked WilmerHale as the No. 1 Top Workplace in DC list in 2019, which has included the firm on its list annually, since 2014.

The American Lawyer named WilmerHale Law Firm of the Year in 2021,noting it as the 17th year that the firm had earned a spot on its A-List.

The American Lawyer jointly named WilmerHale Law Firm of the Year in 2025, among eight firms, four of which were honored for successful challenges to executive orders, and four others for legal representations of those firms.

== Clients ==
=== A Civil Action ===
In the late 1980s, Hale and Dorr partner Jerome Facher represented Beatrice Foods in a suit by eight families from Woburn, Massachusetts who claimed that Beatrice, along with W.R. Grace, had polluted the town's water supply, resulting in an elevated number of leukemia cases and immune-system disorders. The case was memorialized in the book A Civil Action, by Jonathan Harr, and in a movie of the same name starring Robert Duvall as Facher and John Travolta as plaintiffs' lawyer Jan Schlichtmann. Upon further discovery, the EPA took the case on and W.R. Grace was successfully indicted for making false statements. Both W. R. Grace and Beatrice Foods paid a total $64.9 million to clean up the contaminated sites in Woburn.

=== Enron and WorldCom reports ===
In the wake of news articles raising concerns about transactions between Enron and its CFO, Andy Fastow, lawyers from Wilmer, Cutler & Pickering represented a special investigative committee of Enron's board of directors in an internal investigation into those transactions. The resulting report, known as the "Powers Report," laid out the facts that have been the predicate for much of the public discussion of Enron since that time.

Similarly, after WorldCom's announcement that it would have to restate financial statements, the firm represented a special investigative committee of WorldCom's board of directors in performing an internal investigation into the accounting irregularities. The investigation resulted in a widely covered written report that detailed a variety of accounting issues as well as the role of management and the board of directors.

=== Apple Inc. v. Samsung Electronics Co. Ltd. et al ===
WilmerHale counseled Apple Inc. in its contested smartphone patent dispute with Samsung Electronics. A settlement was reached in Apple Inc. v. Samsung Electronics Co. during 2018, after a seven-year-long battle that began when Apple accused Samsung of infringing numerous design and utility patents related to the iPhone.

=== PerkinElmer's acquisition of BioLegend ===
In 2021, WilmerHale represented PerkinElmer in its $5.25 billion acquisition of life sciences company BioLegend, the largest acquisition to date for PerkinElmer.

=== Other notable clients ===
In 1986, Wilmer, Cutler & Pickering represented corporate raider Ivan Boesky in high-profile Department of Justice and SEC proceedings, as well as multiple class actions based on his participation in insider trading violations.

Wilmer, Cutler & Pickering represented Swiss banks accused of profiting from the Holocaust in their settlement negotiations with plaintiffs. The firm also represented Siemens AG, Krupp AG, and other German companies accused of exploiting forced laborers during the Nazi era.

Since 2005, WilmerHale has represented Senator William Frist in regard to an SEC insider trading investigation.

WilmerHale was hired to represent PepsiCo in the SEC investigation related to the departure of PepsiCo general counsel Maura Smith. In the course of this representation, a WilmerHale attorney inadvertently emailed a confidential legal memorandum to a Wall Street Journal reporter as part of an internal communication to other attorneys working on the matter, which made several details of the investigation public.

In early December 2022 Caroline Ellison, former CEO of Alameda Research, hired Stephanie Avakian as her lead attorney.

The firm advised Harvard University President Claudine Gay and University of Pennsylvania President Liz Magill who testified before a congressional hearing regarding antisemitism on college campuses.

WilmerHale was the external law firm hired by OpenAI to conduct a review and investigation into the events surrounding the November 2023 removal and subsequent reinstatement of CEO Sam Altman.

In July 2025, the Financial Times reported that Boston Consulting Group (BCG) had hired WilmerHale to help in an internal investigation on "process failures", referring to the role of the "BCG modelled plan to 'relocate' Palestinians from Gaza".

In April 2026, the Financial Times also reported that Alberto J. Safra, son of Brazilian billionaire Joseph Safra, was billed over $35m by WilmerHale for work between September 2022 and July 2024 over a $23bn estate legal feud that started when the father disinherited Alberto in 2019, just one year prior to Joseph's death in 2020. A judgment of the London’s High Court granted Alberto a full assessment of WilmerHale’s costs. The judge refused the law firm’s request to make Safra pay the remaining $18.9m until the cost’s review was carried out.

== Pro bono ==
Both Hale and Dorr and Wilmer, Cutler & Pickering have a long history of involvement in pro bono work.

WilmerHale lawyers dedicated pro bono hours to addressing issues of systemic racial injustice following the murder of George Floyd in 2020.

Attorneys at the firm also challenged the legality of Georgia's voting maps, claiming that the revised maps diluted Black voting strength.

=== Guantanamo controversy ===
A team of WilmerHale attorneys represents the "Algerian Six", a group of men who fell under suspicion of planning to attack the US embassy in Bosnia and who are now held in the Guantanamo Bay detainment camp.

In 2006, attorney Melissa Hoffer, then part of the team with WilmerHale, delivered a speech in Caen, France, critical of U.S. detainee policy. Other WilmerHale lawyers participating in the case include Stephen Oleskey and Rob Kirsch.

In January 2007, Cully Stimson, deputy assistant secretary of defense for detainee affairs, criticized WilmerHale and other major law firms for representing "the very terrorists who hit their bottom line back in 2001," and questioned whether such work was really being done pro bono or might actually receive funding from shadowy sources. In a Wall Street Journal editorial criticizing Stimson, Harvard Law School professor (and former United States Solicitor General under President Reagan) Charles Fried wrote:

It is no surprise that firms like WilmerHale (which represents both Big Pharma and Tobacco Free Kids), Covington & Burling (which represents both Big Tobacco and Guantanamo detainees), and the other firms on Mr. Stimson's hit list, are among the most sought-after by law school graduates, and retain the loyalty and enthusiasm of their partners. They offer their lawyers the profession at its best and help assure that the rule of law is not just a slogan but a satisfying way of life.

In December 2007, Seth Waxman made the oral argument to the Supreme Court in Boumediene v. Bush which upheld habeas corpus rights for detainees at Guantanamo Bay.

== Notable alumni ==
- Charlene Barshefsky, retired partner; former United States Trade Representative
- Maura Healey, former partner, former Attorney General of Massachusetts and current Governor of Massachusetts
- Alejandro Mayorkas, retired partner, former United States Secretary of Homeland Security
- Robert Mueller, retired partner; former FBI director and special counsel to the investigation into Russian interference in the 2016 US presidential election
- Ken Salazar, senior counsel; former Secretary of the Interior, former U.S. Ambassador to Mexico
- Skye Perryman, former litigator; President and CEO of Democracy Forward.

== See also ==
- List of largest United States-based law firms by profits per partner
