= Saudi High Commission for Relief of Bosnia and Herzegovina =

- Founded: 1993; 33 years ago
- Founder: Salman of Saudi Arabia
- Dissolved: 2001; 25 years ago
- Region served: Bosnia and Herzegovina

The Saudi High Commission for Relief of Bosnia and Herzegovina was an aid agency operating in Bosnia and Herzegovina funded by Saudi Arabia. Set up in 1993 during the Bosnian War to assist Bosnian Muslims, it was forced to close in 2001 after being linked to Islamist terrorism.

Founded by Prince Salman bin Abdulaziz with support from King Fahd, it reportedly spent $600 million in aid, and was awarded the King Faisal International Prize in 2001. In 2001, after the September 11 attacks, the commission's Sarajevo office was raided by NATO forces, who found material relating to those attacks and the bombings of USS Cole and US embassies in Africa, along with materials for forging US State Department badges. An employee, Sabir Mahfouz Lahmar, was detained in Camp X-Ray for an alleged plot to attack the US embassy in Sarajevo and released without charge in 2009. In 2002 U.S. authorities said $46 million of the commission's funds was unaccounted for.
