= Mustafa Ait Idir =

Guantanamo Bay detainee

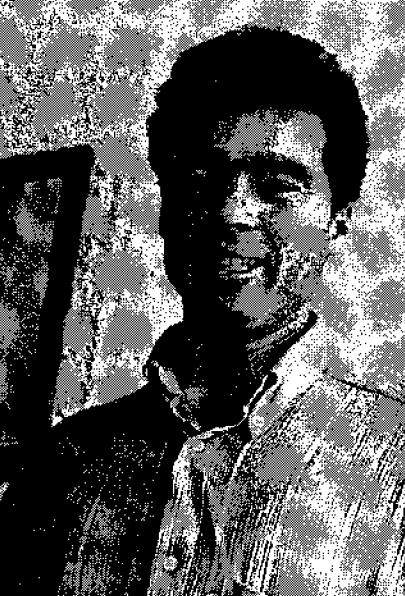
- Mustafa Ait Idir from his OARDEC dossier
- Born: July 9, 1970 (age 56); Sidi M'Hamed, Algeria
- Detained at: Guantanamo
- ISN: 10004
- Status: Released 12/16/08
- Occupation: clergyman

Mustafa Ait Idir (sometimes written as Ait Idr; born July 9, 1970) is an individual formerly held in the United States Guantanamo Bay detainment camps, in Cuba. Ait Idir was born in Algeria, but moved to Bosnia, married a Bosnian woman, and became a Bosnian citizen. Idir was arrested on October 18, 2001, on suspicion of participating in a conspiracy to bomb the United States Embassy. After their release following their acquittal, the six men were captured on January 17, 2002, by American forces, who transferred them to Guantanamo Bay.

Ait Idr has alleged brutal treatment there. He claims that guards beat him when he was shackled, and bent back his fingers, breaking them. During another alleged beating, guards threw him onto a gravel path, where one guard jumped on him, with his full weight, causing a stroke that left part of his face paralyzed.

On December 16, 2008, Ait Idir was one of three prisoners released to Bosnia after he was found innocent.

== Combatant Status Review ==
Ait Idir was among the 60% of prisoners who participated in the tribunal hearings. A Summary of Evidence memo was prepared for the tribunal of each detainee. The memo accused him of the following:

a. The detainee is associated with al Qaida:

1. The detainee is Algerian, but acquired Bosnian citizenship by serving in the Bosnian military in 1995.
2. The detainee is associated with the Armed Islamic Group (GIA).
3. While living in Bosnia, the detainee associated with a known al Qaida operative.
4. At the time of his capture, the detainee had planned to travel to Afghanistan once his al Qaida contact arrived there and had made the necessary arrangements.

b. The detainee participated in military operations against the United States or its coalition partners:

1. The detainee was arrested by Bosnian authorities on 18 October 2001.
2. The detainee was arrested because of his involvement with a plan to attack the U.S. embassy located in Sarajevo.

Washington, D.C.-based Judge Joyce Hens Green extensively quoted a transcript from Idir's Combatant Status Review Tribunal when she decided that the Guantanamo tribunals violated the US Constitution.

=== Administrative Review Board ===
Detainees whose Combatant Status Review Tribunal labeled them "enemy combatants" were scheduled for annual Administrative Review Board hearings. These hearings were designed to assess the threat a detainee might pose if released or transferred, and whether there were other factors that warranted his continued detention.

Ait Idir participated in his Administrative Review Board hearing.

== Suing the US Government ==
The Washington Post reported on April 14, 2005, that Idir's lawyers initiated legal steps to sue the U.S. government to get the videotapes of the incidents with the Initial Reaction Force where he was injured. The IRF is supposed to videotape all of its interventions.

== Thomas P. Sullivan's testimony before the US Senate Judiciary Committee ==
Thomas P. Sullivan is a lawyer who volunteered to serve as a pro bono attorney for several Guantanamo captives. On September 25, 2006, he testified before the United States Senate Judiciary Committee, expressing his concerns about the bill that was to become the Military Commissions Act.

Sullivan's testimony quoted a long passage from Idr's Combatant Status Review Tribunal.

Tribunal Recorder:
While living in Bosnia, the Detainee associated with a known al Qaida operative.
Detainee:
Give me his name.
Tribunal President:
I do not know.
Detainee:
How can I respond to this?
Tribunal President:
Did you know of anybody that was a member of al Qaida?
Detainee:

No, no.

[T]hese are accusations that I can't even answer ... You tell me I am from al Qaida, but I am not al Qaida. I don't have any proof except to ask you to catch Bin Laden and ask him if I am part of al Qaida ... What should be done is you should give me evidence regarding these accusations because I am not able to give you any evidence. I can just tell you no, and that is it.

Sullivan also reminded the Judiciary Committee that US District Court Judge Joyce Hens Green, who had been appointed to oversee the Guantanamo habeas cases following the Supreme Court's decision in Rasul, cited Mr. Idir's hearing as an example of the fundamental unfairness of the CSRT process. See 355 F. Supp. 2d 443 (D.D.C. 2005)."

== Release ==
On December 16, 2008, Mustafa Idir, Boudella al Hajj and Mohammed Nechle were released to Bosnia. According to The Australian, Idir told the Dnevni Avaz:

For almost seven years, I was at the end of the world, at the worst place in the world. It would have been hard even if I had done something wrong (but) it is much harder if one is totally innocent.

On March 3, 2009, El Khabar reported that the Bush administration forced Idir and the other two men to sign undertakings that they would not sue the US government for their kidnapping, before they would be released.

== See also ==
- Algerian Six
- Torture
