= Mohammed Nechle =

Bosnian citizen (born 1968)

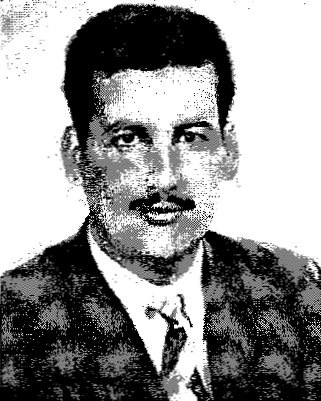
- Mohammad Nechle from his OARDEC dossier
- Born: 2 April 1968 (age 58); Laghouat, Algeria
- Arrested: 17 January 2002; Sarajevo; US forces
- Released: 16 December 2008; Bosnia
- Detained at: Guantanamo
- ISN: 10003
- Charge: No charge (unlawfully detained)
- Status: Released 16 December 2008
- Occupation: clergyman

Mohammed Nechle (born 2 April 1968) is a Bosnian citizen who was wrongly held for almost seven years as an "enemy combatant" in the United States's Guantanamo Bay detention camps, in Cuba.

Nechle was born in Algeria and immigrated to Bosnia in the 1990s. Nechle became a Bosnian citizen, and married a Bosnian woman. Nechle was working for the Red Crescent at the time of al Qaeda attacks of September 11, 2001.

He won his habeas corpus and US District Court Judge Richard J. Leon wrote that there was no evidence that Nechle intended to travel to Afghanistan to take up arms against US forces. Judge Leon declared Nechle's detention as unlawful and ordered his release in November 2008. He was released from Guantanamo and returned to his family in Bosnia on 16 December 2008.

== Arrest and trial by Bosnian authorities ==
Nechle and five other Bosnians of Algerian extraction fell under the suspicion of local US intelligence authorities. The Americans believed these six men, all charity workers, were merely using their charity works as a cover for a plot to bomb the US embassy in Sarajevo.

The six were arrested, charged, tried, and acquitted by the Bosnian legal authorities.

== Extrajudicial capture and transportation by US authorities ==
When they were released by the Bosnians, following their acquittal, they were apprehended by a combined force of Americans and Bosnians. They weren't charged. They were transported to Guantanamo Bay, where all six remained for four years.

== Combatant Status Review Tribunal ==
Combatant Status Review Tribunals were held in a 3 x 5 meter trailer. The detainee sat with his hands and feet shackled to a bolt in the floor. Three chairs were reserved for members of the press, but only 37 of the 574 Tribunals were observed.

Initially the Bush administration asserted that they could withhold all the protections of the Geneva Conventions to detainees from the war on terror. This policy was challenged before the Judicial branch. Critics argued that the USA could not evade its obligation to conduct competent tribunals to determine whether detainees are, or are not, entitled to the protections of prisoner of war status.

Subsequently, the Department of Defense instituted the Combatant Status Review Tribunals. The Tribunals, however, were not authorized to determine whether the detainees were lawful combatants—rather they were merely empowered to make a recommendation as to whether the detainee had previously been correctly determined to match the Bush administration's definition of an enemy combatant.

Nechle chose to participate in his Combatant Status Review Tribunal.

The Associated Press acquired the unclassified portions of the dossiers of one tenth of the Guantanamo Bay detainees. Nechle's dossier is available there.

=== Allegations ===
Nechle's unclassified dossier is 54 pages long. The "Summary of Evidence" memo within his dossier contains the following allegations:

a. The detainee is associated with al Qaida:

1. Detainee is a suspected terrorist with ties to the Algerian Islamic Group (GIA) and is suspected of having links to al Qaida.
2. Detainee is a former employee of the Red Crescent Society and attended meetings in Sarajevo for Algerians working for non-government organizations in Bosnia.
3. The detainee is an associate of a known al Qaida operative in Bosnia.
4. The detainee is also known as Sharfuldin or Sharuldin.

=== Administrative Review Board ===
Detainees whose Combatant Status Review Tribunal labeled them "enemy combatants" were scheduled for annual Administrative Review Board hearings. These hearings were designed to assess the threat a detainee might pose if released or transferred, and whether there were other factors that warranted his continued detention.

Nechle chose to participate in his Administrative Review Board hearing.

== Release ==
I was at the end of the world, at the worst place in the world. It would have been hard even if I had done something wrong, but it is much harder if one is totally innocent.

— Mohammed Nechle

On 16 December 2008, Mustafa Idr, Boudella al Hajj and Mohammed Nechle were released to Bosnia.

On 3 March 2009, El Khabar reported that the Bush administration forced Idr and the other two men to sign undertakings that they would not sue the US government for their kidnapping, before they would be released.
