= Chatter (signals intelligence) =

Volume of intercepted communication

Chatter is a signals intelligence term, referring to the volume (quantity) of intercepted communications. Intelligence officials, not having better metrics, monitor the volume of communication, to or from suspected parties such as terrorists or spies, to determine whether there is cause for alarm. They refer to the electronic communication as "chatter".

Monitoring chatter is an example of traffic analysis, a sub-field of signals intelligence. Intelligence specialists hope to learn significant information by methodically monitoring when and with whom suspects communicate. Even if they cannot decrypt what suspects are saying to one another, a change in the volume of traffic may raise alarm, since a large increase may indicate increased preparation for action, while a sudden decrease may indicate the end of planning and the imminence of action. These considerations do not apply when the targets of analysis follow the military practice of maintaining a steady flow of encrypted communications whether they are needed or not.

Some events, including the capture of the "Algerian Six", were triggered largely by an increase in "chatter".
