= Boumediene v. Bush =

- Supreme Court of the United States

Argued December 5, 2007 Decided June 12, 2008
- Full case name: Lakhdar Boumediene, et al., Petitioners v. George W. Bush, President of the United States, et al.
- Docket no.: 06-1195
- Citations: 553 U.S. 723 (more) 128 S. Ct. 2229; 171 L. Ed. 2d 41; 2008 U.S. LEXIS 4887; 2008 WL 2369628; 76 U.S.L.W. 4406
- Argument: Oral argument

Case history
- Prior: 476 F.3d 981 (D.C. Cir. 2007); cert. denied, 549 U.S. 1328 (2007); cert. granted on rehearing, 551 U.S. 1160 (2007).

Holding
- Foreign terrorism suspects held at the Guantanamo Bay Naval Base in Cuba have constitutional rights to challenge their detention in United States courts. Section 7 of the Military Commissions Act of 2006 (28 U.S.C. § 2241(e)) is unconstitutional.

Court membership
- Chief Justice John Roberts Associate Justices John P. Stevens · Antonin Scalia; Anthony Kennedy · David Souter; Clarence Thomas · Ruth Bader Ginsburg; Stephen Breyer · Samuel Alito

Case opinions
- Majority: Kennedy, joined by Stevens, Souter, Ginsburg, Breyer
- Concurrence: Souter, joined by Ginsburg, Breyer
- Dissent: Roberts, joined by Scalia, Thomas, Alito
- Dissent: Scalia, joined by Roberts, Thomas, Alito

Laws applied
- U.S. Const Art. I, § 9 Military Commissions Act of 2006

Boumediene v. Bush, 553 U.S. 723 (2008), was a writ of habeas corpus petition made in a civilian court of the United States on behalf of Lakhdar Boumediene, a naturalized citizen of Bosnia and Herzegovina, held in military detention by the United States at the Guantanamo Bay detention camps in Cuba. Guantánamo Bay is not formally part of the United States, and under the terms of the 1903 lease between the United States and Cuba, Cuba retained ultimate sovereignty over the territory, while the United States exercises complete jurisdiction and control. The case was consolidated with habeas petition Al Odah v. United States. It challenged the legality of Boumediene's detention at the United States Naval Station military base in Guantanamo Bay, Cuba as well as the constitutionality of the Military Commissions Act of 2006. Oral arguments on the combined cases were heard by the Supreme Court on December 5, 2007.

On June 12, 2008, Justice Anthony Kennedy delivered the opinion for the 5–4 majority, holding that the prisoners had a right to the writ of habeas corpus under the United States Constitution (and in particular the Suspension Clause) and that the Military Commissions Act of 2006 was an unconstitutional suspension of that right. The Court applied the Insular Cases, by the fact that the United States, by virtue of its complete jurisdiction and control, maintains de facto sovereignty over this territory, while Cuba retained ultimate sovereignty over the territory, to hold that the aliens detained as enemy combatants on that territory were entitled to the writ of habeas corpus protected in Article I, Section 9 of the U.S. Constitution. The lower court had expressly indicated that no constitutional rights (not merely the right to habeas) extend to the Guantanamo detainees, rejecting petitioners' arguments, but the Supreme Court held that fundamental rights afforded by the Constitution extend to the Guantanamo detainees as well. Invoking Marbury v. Madison (1803), the Court concluded:

The Nation's basic charter cannot be contracted away like this. The Constitution grants Congress and the President the power to acquire, dispose of, and govern territory, not the power to decide when and where its terms apply. To hold that the political branches may switch the Constitution on or off at will would lead to a regime in which they, not this Court, say 'what the law is'.

Along with Rasul v. Bush (2004), Hamdi v. Rumsfeld (2004), and Hamdan v. Rumsfeld (2006), this was a landmark case in the Court's detainee jurisprudence.

== Background ==
Following the September 11 attacks in 2001, Congress approved the use of military force and the United States launched a "war on terrorism", quickly leading to the United States invasion of Afghanistan (October 2001).

In November 2001, President Bush asserted authority to try captives from the War before "military commissions" instead of through the civilian court system. Many captives from the war were held at Camp X-Ray, which was opened at the United States' Guantanamo Bay Naval Base in Cuba in January 2002. While the United States has an indefinite lease on Guantanamo Bay, Cuba still maintained de jure sovereignty over the area. Because of the mixed jurisdiction, the Bush administration stated that the captives are not subject to American law and have no right to protection under the United States Constitution nor the American justice system.

Beginning in 2002, family and friends of approximately 200 captives initiated habeas corpus submissions to challenge the detentions. These submissions eventually worked their way through the courts, and on June 28, 2004, the United States Supreme Court issued its decision in Rasul v. Bush (2004). In a 6–3 decision, the Court dismissed the administration's argument that the Naval Base is outside civilian courts' jurisdiction and ruled that the captives must be given an opportunity to hear and attempt to refute whatever evidence had caused them to have been classified as "enemy combatants". As a result, the Department of Defense created the Combatant Status Review Tribunals.

At the end of 2005, the United States Congress passed the Detainee Treatment Act (DTA) to limit the jurisdiction of federal courts over habeas petitions from prisoners held at Guantanamo. The DTA restricted the submission of additional habeas corpus submissions to the courts, though it did not affect already filed habeas corpus submissions.

Seven months later, after the Supreme Court ruled in Hamdan v. Rumsfeld (2006) that the Geneva Conventions could be enforced in federal courts, Congress passed the Military Commissions Act of 2006 in October, creating Military Commissions similar to those set up by the Executive Branch in the Hamdan case (and retaining most of the features that had concerned critics. For example, the Commissions were empowered to hear and consider "hearsay evidence", suspects were restricted from attempting to refute or learn about evidence against them that was classified, and submission of evidence extracted from persons using "enhanced interrogation techniques", prior to the passage of the Detainee Treatment Act, was allowed.) The Act attempted to mandate that all outstanding habeas corpus submissions on behalf of the captives should be quashed.

In February 2007, a three-judge panel of the Appeals Court for the D.C. Circuit considered Lakhdar Boumediene's habeas corpus submission, and in a split decision, upheld the Congress's authority to quash the outstanding habeas corpus submissions. In April 2007, the Court declined to review the Circuit Court's decision.

Within a few months, it reversed this decision; on June 29, 2007, it granted a writ of certiorari to Boumediene and his co-defendants.

Over the following six months, in addition to the briefs submitted by the United States government and the petitioner, over 20 amicus briefs were filed on behalf of Boumediene and his co-defendants by the American Civil Liberties Union, the Center for Constitutional Rights, the American Bar Association, and numerous other persons and organizations.

The Supreme Court received over two dozen briefs of amicus curiae on the case, including some written strictly on the history and application of Habeas Corpus in England, Scotland, Hanover, Ireland, Canada, British-controlled territories, India, and the United States. Twenty-two amicus briefs were filed in support of the petitioners, Boumediene and Al Odah, and four were filed in support of the respondents, the Bush Administration.

Oral arguments were held on December 5, 2007, and the Supreme Court announced its decision on June 12, 2008. Petitioners were represented by Seth P. Waxman. The government was represented by Solicitor General Paul D. Clement.

== Opinion of the Court ==
The majority opinion, written by Justice Anthony Kennedy, found that the constitutionally guaranteed right of habeas corpus review applies to persons held in Guantanamo and to persons designated as enemy combatants on that territory. If Congress intends to suspend the right, the Court said that an adequate substitute must offer the prisoner a meaningful opportunity to demonstrate he is held pursuant to an erroneous application or interpretation of relevant law, and the reviewing decision-maker must have some ability to correct errors, to assess the sufficiency of the government's evidence, and to consider relevant exculpating evidence. The court found that the petitioners had met their burden of establishing that the Detainee Treatment Act of 2005 failed to provide an adequate substitute for habeas corpus.

Kennedy's majority opinion begins with an over-twenty page review of the history of habeas corpus in England from its roots in the due process clause of Magna Carta of 1215 to the 19th century. Next, the opinion surveys American historical jurisprudence on the writ from 1789 until shortly after World War II, concentrating on the application of habeas corpus to aliens and territories outside the borders of the United States that still fall under United States control, comparing these areas to the Channel Islands, where the writ did apply. While noting that habeas corpus did not apply in Scotland, a country under the control of the English crown (as the same monarch held the crown of Scotland), the Court distinguished that fact by stating that Scotland kept its unique system of laws even after union with England in 1707. The Court turned to Ireland for a more amenable historical example, pointing out that while it was nominally a sovereign country in the 18th century, English habeas corpus review did apply there since Ireland was under de facto English control and shared the English legal system.

The majority opinion rejected the government's argument comparing the habeas corpus restriction under the MCA to those affected by the Antiterrorism and Effective Death Penalty Act of 1996, which were ruled constitutional after a suspension clause challenge. The Court explained the restrictions of AEDPA on habeas review were not a complete suspension on habeas corpus, but simply procedural limitations, such as limiting the number of successive habeas petitions a prisoner can file, or mandating a one-year time limit for the filing of federal habeas review that begins when the prisoner's judgment and sentence become final.

The main distinction between the MCA and AEDPA, the Court went on to explain, was that AEDPA applies in practice to those prisoners serving a sentence after having been tried in open court and whose sentences have been upheld on direct appeal, whereas the MCA suspends the application of the writ to those detainees whose guilt has not yet been legally determined. In other words, the comparison to AEDPA was found by the majority to be misplaced, in that AEDPA's limitations on habeas review stemmed from cases that had already been to trial, whereas the cases involving MCA had not been to trial and therefore habeas review would have been appropriate.

The Court also concluded that the detainees are not required to exhaust review procedures in the court of appeals before pursuing habeas corpus actions in the district court. The majority distinguished between de jure and de facto sovereignty, finding that the United States had in effect de facto sovereignty over Guantanamo. Distinguishing Guantanamo base from historical precedents, this conclusion allowed the court to conclude that Constitutional protections of habeas corpus run to the U.S. military base at Guantanamo Bay, Cuba.

In the majority ruling, Justice Kennedy called section 7 "not adequate". He explained, "to hold that the political branches may switch the constitution on or off at will would lead to a regime in which they, not this court, 'say what the law is'." The decision struck down section 7 of the MCA, but left intact the remainder of the MCA and the Detainee Treatment Act.

== Other opinions ==
=== Justice Souter's concurrence ===
Justice Souter's concurrence was joined by Justices Ginsburg and Breyer. According to Justice Souter, "subsequent legislation eliminated the statutory habeas jurisdiction" over the claims brought by Guantanamo Bay detainees, "so that now there must be constitutionally based jurisdiction or none at all." Citing the Supreme Court's decision in Rasul v. Bush (2004), he added that the "[a]pplication of the habeas statute to persons detained at [Guantanamo] is consistent with the historical reach of the writ of habeas corpus." Justice Souter pointed to the lengthy imprisonments, some of which have exceeded six years, as "a factor insufficiently appreciated by the dissents." He denied the dissenters' criticism that the Court's majority "is precipitating the judiciary into reviewing claims that the military (subject to appeal to the Court of Appeals for the District of Columbia Circuit) could handle within some reasonable period of time."

=== Justice Scalia's dissent ===
Justice Scalia's dissent was joined by Chief Justice Roberts and Justices Alito and Thomas. Justice Scalia argued that "the procedures prescribed by Congress in the Detainee Treatment Act provide the essential protections that habeas corpus guarantees; there has thus been no suspension of the writ, and no basis exists for judicial intervention beyond what the Act allows." The commission of terrorist acts by some former prisoners at Guantanamo Bay after their release "illustrates the incredible difficulty of assessing who is and who is not an enemy combatant in a foreign theater of operations where the environment does not lend itself to rigorous evidence collection." A consequence of the Court's majority decision will be that "how to handle enemy prisoners in this war will ultimately lie with the branch [the judiciary] that knows least about the national security concerns that the subject entails." A conflict between the Military Commissions Act and the Suspension Clause "arises only if the Suspension Clause preserves the privilege of the writ for aliens held by the United States military as enemy combatants at the base in Guantanamo Bay, located within the sovereign territory of Cuba."

Justice Scalia added that the Court's majority "admits that it cannot determine whether the writ historically extended to aliens held abroad, and it concedes (necessarily) that Guantanamo Bay lies outside the sovereign territory of the United States." Justice Scalia pointed out that Johnson v. Eisentrager (where the Supreme Court decided that U.S. courts had no jurisdiction over German war criminals held in a U.S.-administered German prison in Germany) "thus held—held beyond any doubt—that the Constitution does not ensure habeas for aliens held by the United States in areas over which our Government is not sovereign."

According to Justice Scalia, the Court's majority's "analysis produces a crazy result: Whereas those convicted and sentenced to death for war crimes are without judicial remedy, all enemy combatants detained during a war, at least insofar as they are confined in an area away from the battlefield over which the United States exercises 'absolute and indefinite' control, may seek a writ of habeas corpus in federal court." Justice Scalia added that the Constitution allows suspension of the writ of habeas corpus only in cases of rebellion or invasion, both domestic disturbances; he asked "[i]f the extraterritorial scope of habeas turned on flexible, 'functional' considerations, as the [Court's majority] holds, why would the Constitution limit its suspension almost entirely to instances of domestic crisis?"

=== Chief Justice Roberts' dissent ===
Chief Justice Roberts' dissent focused on whether the process afforded the Guantanamo detainees in the Detainee Treatment Act were an adequate substitute for the Habeas protections the Constitution guaranteed. By arguing in the affirmative, he implied that the issue of whether the detainees had any Suspension Clause rights was moot (since, if they did, he found that those rights were not violated anyway). This line of reasoning was arguably more in line with the plain reading of Johnson v. Eisentrager (1950) (which denied German prisoners of war habeas rights primarily due to both practical logistical concerns and the determination that they had been afforded an adequate substitute: traditional military war crimes trials, which complied with the Geneva Conventions) than that of Justice Scalia, and also avoided the more controversial and complicated issue of whether the detainees were entitled to file habeas petitions in the first place.

== Aftermath ==
On November 20, 2008, following his review of their case files, Judge Richard J. Leon of the United States District Court for the District of Columbia ordered the release of five Guantánamo detainees, including Boumediene. Judge Leon ordered the continued detention of a sixth, Belkacem Bensayah.

In the decision, he wrote:

To allow enemy combatancy to rest on so thin a reed would be inconsistent with this court's obligation; the court must and will grant their petitions and order their release. This is a unique case. Few if any others will be factually like it. Nobody should be lulled into a false sense that all of the ... cases will look like this one.

On October 28, 2009, President Obama signed into law the Military Commissions Act of 2009, which amended the Military Commissions Act of 2006 and provided new rules for the handling of commission trials and commission defendants' rights.

In Boumediene v. Bush (2008), the Supreme Court had ruled for the first time that Guantánamo detainees were entitled to submit habeas corpus petitions directly to federal judges in Washington to determine whether the U.S. government had enough evidence to justify their continued open-ended detention without charge.

The decision said in part: "We do consider it uncontroversial ... that the privilege of habeas corpus entitles the prisoner to a meaningful opportunity to demonstrate he is being [unlawfully] held." The decision added: "The habeas court must have sufficient authority to conduct a meaningful review of both the cause for detention and the Executive's power to detain."

Following the Boumediene decision, federal judges began closely scrutinizing the quality of evidence offered by the government. Government lawyers started losing cases.

In 2010 the D.C. Circuit Court began requiring federal judges to stop submitting the government's evidence to such rigorous examination. The appeals court said judges must embrace a pro-government presumption that the Guantánamo evidence is reliable. Government lawyers had argued that such a presumption was justified because much of the evidence against the detainees was collected under battlefield conditions amid the "fog of war". Specifically, the US appeals court required federal judges hearing Guantánamo cases to accord a special presumption of accuracy to US intelligence reports being used to justify continued detention.

This ruling by the appeals court provoked strong criticism from attorneys representing detainees at Guantanamo as well as from within the appeals court. Lawyers said such a special presumption does not comply with the requirements set by the Supreme Court in its Boumediene decision.

"The court of appeals through its actions in this and other cases has created a regime in which Guantánamo habeas cases are becoming exercises in futility", wrote the Washington lawyer S. William Livingston, in his brief on behalf of Adnan Farhan Abdul Latif. "The entire point of the habeas hearing is to force the government to justify its detention of people who have been neither charged nor convicted, not to allow it to skate by with presumption," Livingston said.

Appeals Court Judge David Tatel wrote a dissenting opinion in the Latif case. He said the appeals court's requirement of a pro-government presumption in favor of US intelligence reports "comes perilously close to suggesting that whatever the government says must be treated as true."

According to a study by legal scholars at the Center for Policy and Research at Seton Hall University School of Law, between 2008 and July 2010, Guantánamo detainees won 56 percent of their habeas challenges in federal court. After July 2010 and the appeals court ruling, the win rate fell to 8 percent. That means that prior to July 2010, a federal judge agreed with 19 of 34 detainees who claimed there was insufficient evidence to justify his open-ended detention at Guantánamo and ordered the release of each. After July 2010, a federal judge agreed with only 1 of 12 detainees. The change is attributed to rulings by the federal appeals court, which has taken up 19 of the Guantánamo habeas cases and reversed or remanded every case in which a federal judge ordered a detainee's release.

== Release to France ==
On May 15, 2009, Boumediene was transferred to France, where he has relatives. His wife and children, who had moved from Bosnia to Algeria following his arrest, have joined him in France since his release.

=== Detainees whose cases were consolidated with Boumediene v. Bush ===
- Belkacem Bensayah
- Saber Lahmar
- Mohammed Nechle
- Mustafa Ait Idir
- Lakhdar Boumediene
- Hadj Boudella

== See also ==
- Algerian Six
- List of United States Supreme Court cases, volume 553
- Ex Parte Quirin
- Ex Parte Milligan
- Johnson v. Eisentrager
