= El Khabar =

Daily newspaper in Algeria

El Khabar الخبر
- El Khabar logo.
- Type: Daily newspaper
- Format: Tabloid
- Owner: El Khabar
- Editor: kamal Djouzi
- Founded: 1990; 36 years ago
- Political alignment: Centre-left
- Language: Arabic, French
- Headquarters: Algiers, Algeria
- Circulation: 500,000 (May 2006 - May 2007)
- Website: www.elkhabar.com

Elkhabar (Arabic: الخبر, lit. 'The News') is a daily newspaper in Algeria published seven days a week in the tabloid format. It is one of the most widely read Algerian newspapers.

El Khabar′s web service publishes selected news in Arabic and French, with a minor section in English.

== History and profile ==
After the fall of Algeria's one-party system in 1988, which tightly controlled the press, a group of young journalist issued the first edition of El Khabar in Algiers on 1 November 1990. The daily which has an independent stance is published in the tabloid format.

In August 2003 El Khabar temporarily ceased publication due to its debt to state-run printing presses.

The paper's online version was the sixth most visited website for 2010 in the MENA region.

== Political views and controversies ==
The paper is independent and has no party affiliation. The paper's critical reporting has resulted in numerous run-ins with the Algerian government, which on a couple of occasions has sent reporters and editors to jail. El Khabar staff was also threatened and attacked by Islamist rebels during Algeria's civil war, which began in 1992 and ended in 2002.

== Notable journalists ==
- Mohamed Cherak (1977–2018)
- Othmane Senadjki (1959–2010)

== See also ==
- List of newspapers in Algeria
