= Richard J. Leon =

American federal judge (born 1949)

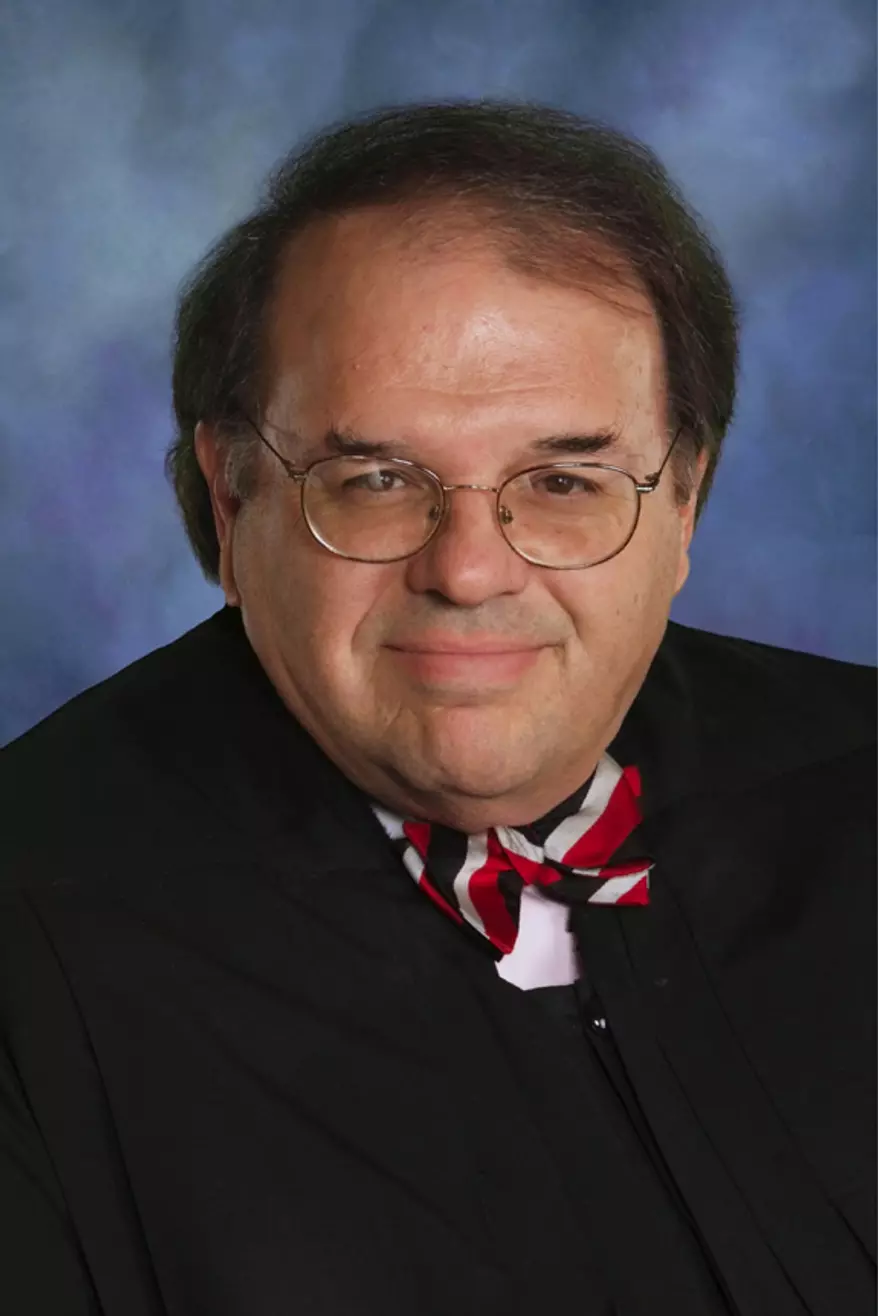
- Official portrait, 2015

Senior Judge of the United States District Court for the District of Columbia
- Incumbent
- Assumed office December 31, 2016

Judge of the United States District Court for the District of Columbia
- In office February 19, 2002 – December 31, 2016
- Appointed by: George W. Bush
- Preceded by: Norma Holloway Johnson
- Succeeded by: Trevor N. McFadden

Personal details
- Born: December 3, 1949 (age 76) Natick, Massachusetts, U.S.
- Education: College of the Holy Cross (BA); Suffolk University (JD); Harvard University (LLM)

Richard J. Leon (born December 3, 1949) is an American jurist who serves as a senior United States district judge of the U.S. District Court for the District of Columbia. He was appointed in 2002 by President George W. Bush and assumed senior status in 2016.

== Early life and education ==
Leon was born in South Natick, Massachusetts, on December 3, 1949. His parents were Silvano B. Leon and Rita M. O'Rorke. His paternal grandparents were immigrants from Portugal who settled in Framingham, Massachusetts.

Leon graduated from the College of the Holy Cross with a Bachelor of Arts in psychology in 1971. As an undergraduate at Holy Cross, he was a member of the school's student judicial board, and was a classmate of Clarence Thomas. He then earned his Juris Doctor (J.D.), cum laude, from the Suffolk University Law School in 1974 and earned a Master of Laws (LL.M.) from Harvard Law School in 1981.

== Legal career ==
Leon served as a law clerk to the justices of the Massachusetts Superior Court from 1974 to 1975 and to Thomas F. Kelleher of the Rhode Island Supreme Court from 1975 to 1976. Leon was an attorney for the Immigration and Naturalization Service of the United States Department of Justice from 1976 to 1977 and a Special Assistant United States Attorney in the office of the United States Attorney for the Southern District of New York working in the Civil Division from 1977 to 1978.

Leon was an assistant professor of law at St. John's University School of Law from 1979 to 1983 and a senior trial attorney in the United States Department of Justice from 1983 to 1987. Leon served as deputy chief minority counsel on the Select Committee to Investigate Covert Arms Transactions with Iran of the United States House of Representatives, which investigated the Iran-Contra affair, from 1987 to 1988.

Leon was appointed Deputy Assistant Attorney General and served from 1988 to 1989, when he entered private practice in Washington, D.C., first with Baker & Hostetler from 1989 to 1999 and then with Vorys, Sater, Seymour and Pease from 1999 to 2002, when he was appointed to the district court.

Leon was a member of the President's Commission on White House Fellowships from 1990 to 1993. Leon was appointed chief minority counsel on the October Surprise Task Force of the House Foreign Affairs Committee from 1992 to 1993. He served as special counsel to the House Financial Services Committee in 1994. He is an adjunct professor at The George Washington University Law School and the Georgetown University Law Center.

== Federal judicial service ==
Leon was nominated to the United States District Court for the District of Columbia by George W. Bush on September 10, 2001, to the seat vacated by Norma Holloway Johnson. Confirmed by the Senate on February 14, 2002, he received his judicial commission five days later. He assumed senior status on December 31, 2016.

=== WilmerHale v. Executive Office of the President (2025) ===
On May 27, 2025, Judge Leon ruled in WilmerHale v. Executive Office of the President, striking down Executive Order 14250 issued by President Donald J. Trump. The order targeted the law firm WilmerHale due to its association with former Special Counsel Robert S. Mueller III. It directed federal agencies to suspend the firm’s security clearances, restrict access to federal buildings, and review existing contracts. Judge Leon found the order to be retaliatory and unconstitutional, violating the First and Fifth Amendments. In a 73-page opinion, he wrote, “The cornerstone of the American system of justice is an independent judiciary and an independent bar willing to tackle unpopular cases, however daunting.”

=== Guantanamo Bay ===
Leon was responsible for adjudicating the habeas corpus petitions of several dozen captives held at the Guantanamo Bay detention camp. Boumediene v. Bush, which was eventually considered by the Supreme Court, was first heard by Leon. By August 28, 2008, Leon had 24 cases assigned to him.

The Associated Press reported Leon hoped to resolve those cases before the presidential inauguration in 2009 and was concerned that the public and the detainees will be barred from observing the hearings: "If it can't be done, I have great concern that these hearings will be virtually or exclusively classified, closed to the public and, I might add, to the detainees."

During a hearing on October 23, 2008, Leon commented on the ambiguity of the term "enemy combatant" and criticized Congress and the Supreme Court: "We are here today, much to my dismay, I might add, to deal with a legal question that in my judgment should have been resolved a long time ago. I don't understand, I really don't, how the Supreme Court made the decision it made and left that question open... I don't understand how the Congress could let it go this long without resolving." On November 20, Leon ordered five detainees released from Guantanamo Bay Naval Base due to insufficient evidence.

In December 2008, Leon denied Moath Hamza Ahmed al Alawi's habeas corpus petition, finding the enemy combatant's detention was lawful under the Authorization for Use of Military Force of 2001. In February 2017, Leon denied another habeas corpus petition from al Alawi, rejecting the detainee's claim that the war's hostilities had ceased.

=== NSA metadata collection unconstitutional ===
On December 16, 2013, Leon ruled that the NSA's bulk collection of Americans' telephone records likely violated the Fourth Amendment to the United States Constitution, though he stayed enforcement of his injunction pending appeal to the D.C. Circuit. Excerpts from his decision are as follows:

I cannot imagine a more "indiscriminate" and "arbitrary invasion" than this systematic and high-tech collection and retention of personal data on virtually every citizen [...] the almost-Orwellian technology [...] Records that once would have revealed a few scattered tiles of information about a person now reveal an entire mosaic – a vibrant constantly updating picture of a person's life. [...] No court has ever recognized a special need sufficient to justify continuous, daily searches of virtually every American citizen without any particularized suspicion. The Government urges me to be the first non-FISC judge to sanction such a dragnet. [...] The Government does not cite a single instance in which analysis of the NSA's bulk metadata collection actually stopped an imminent attack [...] Because of the utter lack of evidence that a terrorist act has ever been prevented because searching the NSA database was faster than other investigative tactics – I have serious doubts about the efficacy of the metadata collection program [...] I have little doubt that the author of our Constitution, James Madison [...] would be aghast.

=== Other notable cases ===
Date	Action taken
January 2010	Leon preliminarily enjoined the Food and Drug Administration from blocking the importation of electronic cigarettes.
January 2010	Leon threw out the charges in an obscenity case against director John Stagliano: "I hope the government will learn a lesson from its experience", calling the Justice Department's prosecution "woefully insufficient".
2011	Leon dismissed former SEC Chairman Harvey Pitt as an expert witness, after Pitt while testifying in a deposition as an expert witness for securities class action plaintiffs suing Fannie Mae, refused to answer any more questions and walked out of his deposition.
November 7, 2011	Leon issued a preliminary injunction against the U.S. Food and Drug Administration for ordering graphic images on cigarette packs. On February 29, 2012, Leon's final ruling held that the graphic images and statements violated the commercial right to free speech.
September 1, 2011	Leon approved Assistant Attorney General Christine A. Varney's agreement allowing the acquisition of NBC Universal by Comcast.
January 2, 2013	Leon ruled that a memo linking the Palestinian Authority (PA) to a suicide bombing that killed two American teenagers and one Israeli teen be returned to the PA or destroyed. The memo had been inadvertently turned over to attorneys for the families of the victims in a lawsuit over the killings. In a motion for a stay of Leon's order, lawyers for the plaintiffs said if they returned or destroyed the memo, "this critically important evidence of murder will likely be lost forever."
May 17, 2016	Leon ruled that limits imposed by Washington, D.C., on permits to carry handguns were unconstitutional. He struck down the District requirement that an applicant show "good reason" before a concealed carry permit would be issued.
August 2016	Leon issued a controversial stay of the Purple Line, a long-delayed light rail transit project in the D.C. suburbs, insisting that the project needed another Environmental Impact Statement. Maryland Governor Larry Hogan noted Leon's close relationship with the Columbia Country Club, a prominent opponent of the project. Leon's ruling was later overruled.
January 4, 2018	Leon denied a request by Fusion GPS to block the House Intelligence Committee from demanding bank records of 70 of the private investigative firm's transactions with law firms, journalists and contractors, ruling that the request "did not violate the company's First Amendment rights" to political speech and association.
June 12, 2018	Leon rejected all of Assistant Attorney General Makan Delrahim's claims and refused to block the $85.4 billion merger of AT&T and Time Warner.
November 29, 2018	Leon raised concerns surrounding the recent close of a $68 billion merger between CVS Health and Aetna Inc. after learning CVS closed its acquisition before obtaining court approval of an antitrust settlement the companies reached with the government. In expressing skepticism over the merger, Leon cited opposition from the American Medical Association (AMA), which previously warned that the deal would lead to higher premium and out-of-pocket costs for patients purchasing drugs, as well as reduce the quality of health insurance. Leon chided the companies and the Justice Department for treating him like a “rubber stamp," complaining he was “being kept in the dark” about the closing of the merger.
February 15, 2019	Leon dismissed a lawsuit brought by the North American Butterfly Association against the Department of Homeland Security (DHS) seeking to prevent the building of a border wall through its National Butterfly Center, a 100-acre wildlife preserve in the Rio Grande Valley in Texas. He said the Fourth Amendment against unreasonable searches and seizures "offers little refuge for unenclosed land near one of the country’s external borders" and that environmental review had been properly waived by the DHS.
July 19, 2019	Leon upheld the Trump administration's health insurance expansion that allowed companies to offer additional plans that do not meet the coverage requirements of the Affordable Care Act. Leon rejected the claim by the Association for Community Affiliated Plans that the move to authorize short-term coverage plans was a violation of the Administrative Procedure Act, and granted summary judgement to the government. The insurance companies plan to appeal.
November 2019	Leon ruled that President Barack Obama's proclamation that expanded the Cascade-Siskiyou National Monument in Oregon violated the Oregon and California Railroad and Coos Bay Wagon Road Grant Lands Act of 1937. In that case, American Forest Resource Council v. Hammond, Leon also held that the Bureau of Land Management had wrongly restricted commercial timber harvesting on the O&C Lands under the Northwest Forest Plan. Leon's decision was reversed by the U.S. Court of Appeals for the District of Columbia Circuit in July 2023.
December 30, 2019	Leon dismissed Charles M. Kupperman v United States House of Representatives, et al., a case, briefly, at the center of both the Trump–Ukraine scandal and the impeachment proceedings against President Donald Trump which became moot due to the subpoenas being withdrawn.
March 29, 2022	Leon dismissed the Electronic Frontier Foundation's constitutional challenge against the Stop Enabling Sex Traffickers Act (SESTA) in the case Woodhull Freedom Foundation, et al. v. U.S.; Leon upheld the constitutionality of the law and rejected the plaintiffs' arguments. His ruling was affirmed by Court of Appeals for the D.C. Circuit on July 7, 2023 following the Electronic Frontier Foundation's appeal.
March 28, 2025	Leon granted in part and denied in part a TRO (Temporary Restraining Order) to temporarily stop the Trump Administration from enforcing its executive order targeting the law firm WilmerHale in the case Wilmer Cutler Pickering Hale and Dorr, LLP v. Executive Office of The President et al.
June 10, 2025	Leon ruled that former US African Development Foundation board member Ward Brehm lacked standing to challenge the appointment of Pete Marocco as the foundation's president as Brehm had been legally removed from his position beforehand.
January 12, 2026	Leon was assigned to the civil case brought by Senator Mark Kelly against Secretary of Defense Pete Hegseth. The case was meant to challenge Secretary Hegseth's censure of Senator Kelly and potential attempt to demote the retired US Navy CAPT over a video that was released where Kelly along with other Democratic elected officials said service members have an obligation to not follow illegal orders. On 12 February 2026, Judge Leon issued a preliminary injunction in favor of Senator Kelly, and sharply rebuked Secretary Hegseth's censure as a violation of Kelly's First Amendment rights.
March 31, 2026	Leon ordered that construction be halted on President Trump’s proposed White House ballroom, which Trump planned to be built on the site of the demolished White House East Wing.
April 16, 2026	Leon, this time responding to a federal appeals court ruling, again issued a ruling which halted the aboveground construction of the proposed White House ballroom, officially siding with arguments made by the National Trust for Historic Preservation that Trump bypassed required Congressional oversight.
May 13, 2026	Leon issued a preliminary injunction blocking U.S. sanctions imposed against Francesca Albanese, ruling that they violated her First Amendment rights.

== See also ==
- Timeline of investigations into Trump and Russia (2019)

Legal offices
Preceded by Norma Holloway Johnson	Judge of the United States District Court for the District of Columbia; 2002–2016	Succeeded by Trevor N. McFadden
