= List of nicknames used by Donald Trump =

Donald Trump, the 45th and 47th president of the United States, has been widely known for his frequent use of nicknames during his political career to criticize, insult, or otherwise express commentary about various political and media figures, foreign leaders, and organizations.

== Domestic political figures ==
Subject			Nickname(s)
Personal name (Birth–death)	Office(s)	Political party	Nickname(s)
Amy Acton (b. 1966)	Governor-elect of Ohio since the 2026 gubernatorial election	Democratic	Lyin' Amy Acton
Annie Andrews (b. 1981)	Senator-elect of South Carolina since the 2026 Senate election, who is not transgender	Democratic	Annie Trannie
Annie Andrews (b. 1981)	Senator-elect of South Carolina since the 2026 Senate election, who is not transgender	Democratic	Trannie Andrews
Steve Bannon (b. 1953)	White House chief strategist and senior counselor to the president (January – August 2017)	Republican	Sloppy Steve
Aftyn Behn (b. 1989)	Tennessee state representative since 2023; Democratic nominee for Tennessee's 7th congressional district 2025 special election	Democratic	AOC of Tennessee
Joe Biden (b. 1942)	46th President of the United States (2021–2025); 47th Vice President of the United States (2009–2017); Senator from Delaware (1973–2009); Democratic nominee who defeated Trump in the 2020 presidential election; Trump's successor and predecessor as president	Democratic	Crooked Joe
Joe Biden (b. 1942)	46th President of the United States (2021–2025); 47th Vice President of the United States (2009–2017); Senator from Delaware (1973–2009); Democratic nominee who defeated Trump in the 2020 presidential election; Trump's successor and predecessor as president	Democratic	Joe Hiden
Joe Biden (b. 1942)	46th President of the United States (2021–2025); 47th Vice President of the United States (2009–2017); Senator from Delaware (1973–2009); Democratic nominee who defeated Trump in the 2020 presidential election; Trump's successor and predecessor as president	Democratic	Sleepy Joe
Joe Biden (b. 1942)	46th President of the United States (2021–2025); 47th Vice President of the United States (2009–2017); Senator from Delaware (1973–2009); Democratic nominee who defeated Trump in the 2020 presidential election; Trump's successor and predecessor as president	Democratic	Slow Joe
Joe Biden (b. 1942)	46th President of the United States (2021–2025); 47th Vice President of the United States (2009–2017); Senator from Delaware (1973–2009); Democratic nominee who defeated Trump in the 2020 presidential election; Trump's successor and predecessor as president	Democratic	Autopen
Michael Bloomberg (b. 1942)	109th Mayor of New York City (2002–2013); 2020 Democratic presidential candidate; former CEO of Bloomberg L.P.	Democratic (since 2018); Independent (2007–2018); Republican (2001–2007); Democratic (until 2001)	Mini Mike
Richard Blumenthal (b. 1946)	Senator from Connecticut since 2011; 23rd Attorney General of Connecticut (1991–2011)	Democratic	Da Nang Dick
Alvin Bragg (b. 1973)	37th District Attorney of New York County since 2022	Democratic	Fat Alvin
Jerry Brown (b. 1938)	34th and 39th Governor of California (1975–1983; 2011–2019); 31st Attorney General of California (2007–2011); 23rd Secretary of State of California (1971–1975); 6th Chair of the California Democratic Party (1989–1991)	Democratic	Gov. Jerry "Moonbeam" Brown (Note: Brown has had the nickname "Moonbeam", coined by Mike Royko, since the 1970s, predating Trump's use of the nickname.)
George P. Bush (b. 1976)	28th Land Commissioner of Texas (2015–2023)	Republican	My Bush (Note: The name was in reference to the fact that George P. Bush was the only member of the Bush family to support Trump publicly. Most of the Bush family, including George's father Jeb Bush and former presidents George H. W. Bush and George W. Bush, denounced Trump.)
Jeb Bush (b. 1953)	43rd Governor of Florida (1999–2007) ; 2016 Republican presidential candidate	Republican	Low Energy Jeb
Pete Buttigieg (b. 1982)	32nd Mayor of South Bend, Indiana (2012–2020); 19th Secretary of Transportation (2021–2025); 2020 Democratic presidential candidate	Democratic	Alfred E. Neuman
Elaine Chao (b. 1953)	18th Secretary of Transportation (2001–2009); 24th Secretary of Labor (2017–2021); wife of former Senate Republican leader Mitch McConnell	Republican	Coco Chow
Chris Christie (b. 1962)	55th Governor of New Jersey (2010–2018), United States Attorney for the District of New Jersey (2002–2008); Republican presidential candidate in 2016 and 2024	Republican	Sloppy Chris Christie
Hillary Clinton (b. 1947)	First Lady of the United States (1993–2001); 67th Secretary of State (2009–2013); Senator from New York (2001–2009); Democratic nominee whom Trump defeated in the 2016 presidential election	Democratic	Crazy Hillary
Hillary Clinton (b. 1947)	First Lady of the United States (1993–2001); 67th Secretary of State (2009–2013); Senator from New York (2001–2009); Democratic nominee whom Trump defeated in the 2016 presidential election	Democratic	Crooked Hillary
Hillary Clinton (b. 1947)	First Lady of the United States (1993–2001); 67th Secretary of State (2009–2013); Senator from New York (2001–2009); Democratic nominee whom Trump defeated in the 2016 presidential election	Democratic	Beautiful Hillary
Hillary Clinton (b. 1947)	First Lady of the United States (1993–2001); 67th Secretary of State (2009–2013); Senator from New York (2001–2009); Democratic nominee whom Trump defeated in the 2016 presidential election	Democratic	Hillary Rotten Clinton
James Comey (b. 1960)	7th Director of the FBI (2013–2017; fired by Trump); U.S. Deputy Attorney General (2003–2005)	Independent (since 2016); Republican (until 2016)	Leakin' James Comey
James Comey (b. 1960)	7th Director of the FBI (2013–2017; fired by Trump); U.S. Deputy Attorney General (2003–2005)	Independent (since 2016); Republican (until 2016)	Lyin' James Comey
James Comey (b. 1960)	7th Director of the FBI (2013–2017; fired by Trump); U.S. Deputy Attorney General (2003–2005)	Independent (since 2016); Republican (until 2016)	Shadey James Comey
James Comey (b. 1960)	7th Director of the FBI (2013–2017; fired by Trump); U.S. Deputy Attorney General (2003–2005)	Independent (since 2016); Republican (until 2016)	Slimeball James Comey
James Comey (b. 1960)	7th Director of the FBI (2013–2017; fired by Trump); U.S. Deputy Attorney General (2003–2005)	Independent (since 2016); Republican (until 2016)	Slippery James Comey
Bob Corker (b. 1952)	Senator from Tennessee from 2007 to 2019	Republican	Liddle' Bob Corker
Ted Cruz (b. 1970)	Senator from Texas since 2013; 3rd Solicitor General of Texas (2003–2008); 2016 Republican presidential candidate	Republican	Lyin' Ted
Ted Cruz (b. 1970)	Senator from Texas since 2013; 3rd Solicitor General of Texas (2003–2008); 2016 Republican presidential candidate	Republican	Beautiful Ted
Ted Cruz (b. 1970)	Senator from Texas since 2013; 3rd Solicitor General of Texas (2003–2008); 2016 Republican presidential candidate	Republican	Texas Ted
Ron DeSantis (b. 1978)	46th Governor of Florida (2019-2027); 2024 Republican presidential candidate	Republican	Rob
Ron DeSantis (b. 1978)	46th Governor of Florida (2019-2027); 2024 Republican presidential candidate	Republican	Ron DeSanctimonious (retired)
Ron DeSantis (b. 1978)	46th Governor of Florida (2019-2027); 2024 Republican presidential candidate	Republican	Ron DeSanctus
Ron DeSantis (b. 1978)	46th Governor of Florida (2019-2027); 2024 Republican presidential candidate	Republican	Meatball Ron (refused by Trump)
Ron DeSantis (b. 1978)	46th Governor of Florida (2019-2027); 2024 Republican presidential candidate	Republican	Tiny D
Betsy DeVos (b. 1958)	11th Secretary of Education (2017–2021); Chair of the Michigan Republican Party (1996–2000; 2003–2005)	Republican	Ditzy DeVos
Abdul El-Sayed (b. 1984)	Senator-elect of Michigan since the 2026 Senate election	Democratic	Mohammed
Abdul El-Sayed (b. 1984)	Senator-elect of Michigan since the 2026 Senate election	Democratic	Mohammed Al-Fayad
Abdul El-Sayed (b. 1984)	Senator-elect of Michigan since the 2026 Senate election	Democratic	Mohammed El-Sayed
Abdul El-Sayed (b. 1984)	Senator-elect of Michigan since the 2026 Senate election	Democratic	Abdul Ramadan
Abdul El-Sayed (b. 1984)	Senator-elect of Michigan since the 2026 Senate election	Democratic	Abdullah Subdalala
Abdul El-Sayed (b. 1984)	Senator-elect of Michigan since the 2026 Senate election	Democratic	Abdullah Babababa Mohammed El-Sayed
Dianne Feinstein (1933–2023)	Senator from California from 1992 to 2023	Democratic	Sneaky Dianne
Jeff Flake (b. 1962)	Senator from Arizona (2013–2019); U.S. Representative from Arizona (2001–2013)	Republican	Jeff Flakey
Al Franken (b. 1951)	Senator from Minnesota (2009–2018)	Democratic (DFL)	Al Frankenstein
Nikki Haley (b. 1972)	116th Governor of South Carolina (2011–2017); 29th U.S. Ambassador to the United Nations (2017–2018); 2024 Republican presidential candidate	Republican	Birdbrain
Kamala Harris (b. 1964)	49th Vice President of the United States (2021–2025); Senator from California (2017–2021); 32nd Attorney General of California (2011–2017); Democratic nominee whom Trump defeated in the 2024 presidential election	Democratic	Comrade Kamala
Kamala Harris (b. 1964)	49th Vice President of the United States (2021–2025); Senator from California (2017–2021); 32nd Attorney General of California (2011–2017); Democratic nominee whom Trump defeated in the 2024 presidential election	Democratic	Crazy Kamala
Kamala Harris (b. 1964)	49th Vice President of the United States (2021–2025); Senator from California (2017–2021); 32nd Attorney General of California (2011–2017); Democratic nominee whom Trump defeated in the 2024 presidential election	Democratic	Jamala(K!)
Kamala Harris (b. 1964)	49th Vice President of the United States (2021–2025); Senator from California (2017–2021); 32nd Attorney General of California (2011–2017); Democratic nominee whom Trump defeated in the 2024 presidential election	Democratic	Laffin' Kamala
Kamala Harris (b. 1964)	49th Vice President of the United States (2021–2025); Senator from California (2017–2021); 32nd Attorney General of California (2011–2017); Democratic nominee whom Trump defeated in the 2024 presidential election	Democratic	Lyin' Kamala Harris
Kamala Harris (b. 1964)	49th Vice President of the United States (2021–2025); Senator from California (2017–2021); 32nd Attorney General of California (2011–2017); Democratic nominee whom Trump defeated in the 2024 presidential election	Democratic	Kamabla
Asa Hutchinson (b. 1950)	46th Governor of Arkansas (2015–2023); 2024 Republican presidential candidate	Republican	Aida Hutchinson
Letitia James (b. 1958)	67th Attorney General of New York since 2019	Democratic	Peekaboo
Hakeem Jeffries (b. 1970)	House Minority Leader (2023-2027); Leader of the House Democratic Caucus since 2023; U.S. Representative from New York since 2013	Democratic	High Tax Jeffries
Hakeem Jeffries (b. 1970)	House Minority Leader (2023-2027); Leader of the House Democratic Caucus since 2023; U.S. Representative from New York since 2013	Democratic	Low IQ Person Hakeem Jeffries
Jim Justice (b. 1951)	Senator from West Virginia since 2025; 36th Governor of West Virginia (2017–2025)	Republican	Big Jim
John Kasich (b. 1952)	69th Governor of Ohio (2011–2019); 2016 Republican presidential candidate; U.S. Representative from Ohio (1983–2001)	Republican	1 for 38 (Note: The name was about Kasich winning only one state during the Republican primaries.)
John Kasich (b. 1952)	69th Governor of Ohio (2011–2019); 2016 Republican presidential candidate; U.S. Representative from Ohio (1983–2001)	Republican	1 for 44
Robert F. Kennedy Jr. (b. 1954)	26th Secretary of Health and Human Services since 2025; 2024 independent presidential candidate	Independent (since 2023); Democratic (until 2023)	Junior
Zohran Mamdani (b. 1991)	112th Mayor of New York City since 2026; Member of the New York State Assembly (2021–2025)	Democratic (DSA)	My Little Communist
Zohran Mamdani (b. 1991)	112th Mayor of New York City since 2026; Member of the New York State Assembly (2021–2025)	Democratic (DSA)	Liddle' Communist
Zohran Mamdani (b. 1991)	112th Mayor of New York City since 2026; Member of the New York State Assembly (2021–2025)	Democratic (DSA)	Mamdani the Commie
Zohran Mamdani (b. 1991)	112th Mayor of New York City since 2026; Member of the New York State Assembly (2021–2025)	Democratic (DSA)	100% Communist Lunatic
Thomas Massie (b. 1971)	U.S. Representative from Kentucky from 2012 to 2027	Republican	Rand Paul Jr.
Thomas Massie (b. 1971)	U.S. Representative from Kentucky from 2012 to 2027	Republican	Stone Cold Loser
James Mattis (b. 1950)	26th Secretary of Defense from 2017 to 2019	Independent	Mad Dog (Note: "Mad Dog" is not original to Trump; Mattis acquired the nickname during his service in the Marines.)
Kevin McCarthy (b. 1965)	Speaker of the House of Representatives (January – October 2023); House Minority Leader (2019–2023); House Majority Leader (2014–2019)	Republican	My Kevin
Mitch McConnell (b. 1942)	Senator from Kentucky since 1985; Senate Majority Leader (2015–2021); Senate Minority Leader (2007–2015; 2021–2025)	Republican	Broken Old Crow
Evan McMullin (b. 1976)	Former CIA operations officer; 2016 independent presidential candidate	Independent (since 2016); Republican (until 2016)	Evan McMuffin
Stephen Miller (b. 1985)	White House Deputy Chief of Staff for Policy and 12th U.S. Homeland Security Advisor since 2025; 33rd White House Chief of Staff since 2026	Republican	Weird Stephen
Jerry Nadler (b. 1947)	U.S. Representative from New York since 1992; ranking member and former chair of the House Judiciary Committee	Democratic	Fat Jerry
Omarosa Manigault Newman (b. 1974)	Former The Apprentice contestant; aide to Trump	Independent (since 2019); Republican (2015–2019); Democratic (until 2015)	Wacky Omarosa
Peter Navarro (b. 1949)	Senior Counselor for Trade and Manufacturing since 2025; Director of the Office of Trade and Manufacturing Policy (2017–2021); Director of the White House National Trade Council (January – April 2017)	Republican (since 2018); Democratic (1994–2018); Independent (1991–1994); Republican (1989–1991); Independent (1986–1989); Democratic (until 1986)	My Peter
Gavin Newsom (b. 1967)	40th Governor of California since 2019; 49th Lieutenant Governor of California (2011–2019); 42nd Mayor of San Francisco (2004–2011)	Democratic	Governor Newscum
Gavin Newsom (b. 1967)	40th Governor of California since 2019; 49th Lieutenant Governor of California (2011–2019); 42nd Mayor of San Francisco (2004–2011)	Democratic	President of the United States Gavin Newscum
Gavin Newsom (b. 1967)	40th Governor of California since 2019; 49th Lieutenant Governor of California (2011–2019); 42nd Mayor of San Francisco (2004–2011)	Democratic	Slimy Newscum
Alexandria Ocasio-Cortez (b. 1989)	U.S. Representative from New York since 2019	Democratic (DSA)	Evita
Alexandria Ocasio-Cortez (b. 1989)	U.S. Representative from New York since 2019	Democratic (DSA)	The Mouse
Alexandria Ocasio-Cortez (b. 1989)	U.S. Representative from New York since 2019	Democratic (DSA)	Stupid AOC
Alexandria Ocasio-Cortez (b. 1989)	U.S. Representative from New York since 2019	Democratic (DSA)	The Chihuahua
Jon Ossoff (b. 1987)	Senator from Georgia since 2021	Democratic	Pee-wee Herman lookalike
Jon Ossoff (b. 1987)	Senator from Georgia since 2021	Democratic	Pinky Herman
Barack Obama (b. 1961)	44th President of the United States (2009–2017); Senator from Illinois (2005–2008); Member of the Illinois Senate (1997–2004); Trump's predecessor as president	Democratic	Cheatin' Obama
Barack Obama (b. 1961)	44th President of the United States (2009–2017); Senator from Illinois (2005–2008); Member of the Illinois Senate (1997–2004); Trump's predecessor as president	Democratic	Barack Hussein Obama (Note: Obama's full name is Barack Hussein Obama. According to Professor Karrin Vasby Anderson of Colorado State University, Trump referring to Obama by his full name acts as a dog whistle for Trump's supporters that triggers negative associations between the Arabic name Hussein and Obama himself.)
Barack Obama (b. 1961)	44th President of the United States (2009–2017); Senator from Illinois (2005–2008); Member of the Illinois Senate (1997–2004); Trump's predecessor as president	Democratic	Obuma
JB Pritzker (b. 1965)	43rd Governor of Illinois since 2019	Democratic	Big Fat Slob
JB Pritzker (b. 1965)	43rd Governor of Illinois since 2019	Democratic	That Fat Shit from Illinois
JB Pritzker (b. 1965)	43rd Governor of Illinois since 2019	Democratic	The Governor of Chicago
Nancy Pelosi (b. 1940)	52nd Speaker of the House of Representatives (2007–2011; 2019–2023); House Minority Leader (2003–2007; 2011–2019); Leader of the House Democratic Caucus (2003–2023); U.S. Representative from California since 1987	Democratic	Crazy Nancy
Nancy Pelosi (b. 1940)	52nd Speaker of the House of Representatives (2007–2011; 2019–2023); House Minority Leader (2003–2007; 2011–2019); Leader of the House Democratic Caucus (2003–2023); U.S. Representative from California since 1987	Democratic	Nervous Nancy
Mike Pence (b. 1959)	48th Vice President of the United States (2017–2021); 50th Governor of Indiana (2013–2017); U.S. Representative from Indiana (2001–2013); 2024 Republican presidential candidate	Republican	Liddle Mike Pence
Mike Pompeo (b. 1963)	70th Secretary of State (2018–2021); Director of the CIA (2017–2018); U.S. Representative from Kansas (2011–2017)	Republican	My Mike
Jerome Powell (b. 1953)	16th Chair of the Federal Reserve from 2018 to 2026	Republican	Mr. Too Late
Jerome Powell (b. 1953)	16th Chair of the Federal Reserve from 2018 to 2026	Republican	Jerome Too Late Powell
Jacky Rosen (b. 1957)	Senator from Nevada since 2019; U.S. Representative from Nevada (2017–2019)	Democratic	Wacky Jacky
Rod Rosenstein (b. 1965)	37th U.S. Deputy Attorney General from 2017 to 2019	Republican	Mister Peepers (denied by Trump)
Marco Rubio (b. 1971)	72nd Secretary of State since 2025; Senator from Florida (2011–2025); 94th Speaker of the Florida House of Representatives (2006–2008); Member of the Florida House of Representatives (2000–2008); 2016 Republican presidential candidate	Republican	Little Marco (retired)
Bernie Sanders (b. 1941)	Senator from Vermont since 2007; Democratic presidential candidate in 2016 and 2020	Independent (since 1978); Democratic (2015–2016; 2019–2020)	Crazy Bernie
Ben Sasse (b. 1972)	Senator from Nebraska from 2015 to 2023	Republican	Little Ben Sasse
Adam Schiff (b. 1960)	Senator from California since 2024; U.S. Representative from California (2001–2024); Chair of House Intelligence Committee (2019–2023); California State Senator (1996–2000)	Democratic	Liddle' Adam Schiff
Adam Schiff (b. 1960)	Senator from California since 2024; U.S. Representative from California (2001–2024); Chair of House Intelligence Committee (2019–2023); California State Senator (1996–2000)	Democratic	Adam Schitt
Adam Schiff (b. 1960)	Senator from California since 2024; U.S. Representative from California (2001–2024); Chair of House Intelligence Committee (2019–2023); California State Senator (1996–2000)	Democratic	Pencil Neck
Adam Schiff (b. 1960)	Senator from California since 2024; U.S. Representative from California (2001–2024); Chair of House Intelligence Committee (2019–2023); California State Senator (1996–2000)	Democratic	Shifty Schiff
Adam Schiff (b. 1960)	Senator from California since 2024; U.S. Representative from California (2001–2024); Chair of House Intelligence Committee (2019–2023); California State Senator (1996–2000)	Democratic	Watermelon Head
Adam Schiff (b. 1960)	Senator from California since 2024; U.S. Representative from California (2001–2024); Chair of House Intelligence Committee (2019–2023); California State Senator (1996–2000)	Democratic	Structural Marvel
Eric Schneiderman (b. 1954)	65th Attorney General of New York from 2011 to 2018	Democratic	Lightweight A.G. Eric Schneiderman
Chuck Schumer (b. 1950)	Senator from New York since 1999; Senate Minority Leader (2017–2021; 2025-2027); Senate Majority Leader (2021–2025)	Democratic	Cryin' Chuck
Chuck Schumer (b. 1950)	Senator from New York since 1999; Senate Minority Leader (2017–2021; 2025-2027); Senate Majority Leader (2021–2025)	Democratic	Fake Tears Chuck Schumer
Chuck Schumer (b. 1950)	Senator from New York since 1999; Senate Minority Leader (2017–2021; 2025-2027); Senate Majority Leader (2021–2025)	Democratic	Our Great Palestinian Senator
Jeff Sessions (b. 1946)	84th U.S. Attorney General (2017–2018; fired by Trump); Senator from Alabama (1997–2017); Attorney General of Alabama (1995–1997)	Republican	Mr. Magoo (denied by Trump)
Jack Smith (b. 1969)	Special counsel in both cases involving the federal prosecution of Donald Trump	Independent	Deranged Jack Smith
Tom Steyer (b. 1957)	Businessman; 2020 Democratic presidential candidate, 2026 Democratic California Gubernatorial primary candidate	Democratic	Weirdo Tom Steyer
Luther Strange (b. 1953)	Senator from Alabama (2017–2018); 47th Attorney General of Alabama (2011–2017)	Republican	Big Luther (Note: The nickname has been in use since at least 2010. During Strange's U.S. Senate campaign in 2017, Trump incorrectly implied that he was the first to use it.)
James Talarico (b. 1989)	Senator-elect of Texas since the 2026 Senate election; Member of Texas House of Representatives from 2018 to 2027	Democratic	Alfred E. Neuman
James Talarico (b. 1989)	Senator-elect of Texas since the 2026 Senate election; Member of Texas House of Representatives from 2018 to 2027	Democratic	James Talafreako
James Talarico (b. 1989)	Senator-elect of Texas since the 2026 Senate election; Member of Texas House of Representatives from 2018 to 2027	Democratic	Talacreepo
Marjorie Taylor Greene (b. 1974)	U.S. Representative from Georgia from 2021 to 2026	Republican (until 2026)	Marjorie Taylor Brown
Marjorie Taylor Greene (b. 1974)	U.S. Representative from Georgia from 2021 to 2026	Republican (until 2026)	Marjorie Traitor Green [sic]
Marjorie Taylor Greene (b. 1974)	U.S. Representative from Georgia from 2021 to 2026	Republican (until 2026)	Marjorie "Traitor" Brown
Tim Walz (b. 1964)	41st Governor of Minnesota since 2019; Democratic nominee for Vice President in the 2024 presidential election	Democratic (DFL)	Tampon Tim
Tim Walz (b. 1964)	41st Governor of Minnesota since 2019; Democratic nominee for Vice President in the 2024 presidential election	Democratic (DFL)	The Corrupt Governor of Minnesota
Tim Walz (b. 1964)	41st Governor of Minnesota since 2019; Democratic nominee for Vice President in the 2024 presidential election	Democratic (DFL)	The Seriously Retarded Governor of Minnesota
Elizabeth Warren (b. 1949)	Senator from Massachusetts since 2013; 2020 Democratic presidential candidate	Democratic (since 1996); Republican (1991–1996)	Goofy Elizabeth Warren
Elizabeth Warren (b. 1949)	Senator from Massachusetts since 2013; 2020 Democratic presidential candidate	Democratic (since 1996); Republican (1991–1996)	Pocahontas
Maxine Waters (b. 1938)	U.S. Representative from California since 1991	Democratic	Low-IQ Maxine Waters
Gretchen Whitmer (b. 1971)	49th Governor of Michigan since 2019	Democratic	Half Whitmer
Gretchen Whitmer (b. 1971)	49th Governor of Michigan since 2019	Democratic	That Woman from Michigan
Susie Wiles (b. 1957)	32nd White House Chief of Staff from 2025 to 2027	Republican	Ice Maiden
Susie Wiles (b. 1957)	32nd White House Chief of Staff from 2025 to 2027	Republican	Susie Trump
Russell Vought (b. 1976)	Director of the Office of Management and Budget (2019–2021; since 2025)	Republican	Darth Vader

== Foreign leaders ==
Subject		Nickname(s)
Personal name	Office	Nickname(s)
Bashar al-Assad	President of Syria from 2000 to 2024	Animal Assad
Nayib Bukele	43rd President of El Salvador since 2019	President B
Mark Carney	Prime Minister of Canada since 2025	Governor Carney
Abdel Fattah el-Sisi	6th President of Egypt since 2014	My Favorite Dictator
Mohammad Bagher Ghalibaf	Speaker of the Parliament of the Islamic Republic of Iran since 2020	Muhammad Something
Shigeru Ishiba	Prime Minister of Japan from 2024 to 2025	Mr Japan
Kim Jong Un	3rd Supreme Leader of North Korea since 2011	Rocket Man
Kim Jong Un	3rd Supreme Leader of North Korea since 2011	Little Rocket Man
Benjamin Netanyahu	Prime Minister of Israel since 2022	Warrior Prime Minister
Andrés Manuel López Obrador	65th President of Mexico from 2018 to 2024	Juan Trump
Keir Starmer	Prime Minister of the United Kingdom from 2024 to 2026	Loser (Note: Per The Telegraph, Trump has repeatedly used the nickname for Starmer in conversations with friends)
Justin Trudeau	Prime Minister of Canada from 2015 to 2025	Governor Trudeau (Note: First said by Trump after he suggested that Canada should become the 51st state.)
Xi Jinping	General Secretary of the Chinese Communist Party since 2012	Mr X-i

== Media figures ==
Personal name	Nickname	Notes
Peter Baker	Liddle' Peter Baker	Chief White House correspondent for The New York Times
Shannon Bream	Milk Toast	American journalist, host of Fox News Sunday
Mika Brzezinski	Crazy Mika Brzezinski	Co-host of Morning Joe; wife of Joe Scarborough
Mika Brzezinski	Dumb as a Rock Mika	Co-host of Morning Joe; wife of Joe Scarborough
Mika Brzezinski	Low I.Q. Crazy Mika	Co-host of Morning Joe; wife of Joe Scarborough
Tucker Carlson	Kooky Tucker Carlson	Former host of Tucker Carlson Tonight; Host of The Tucker Carlson Show podcast
Graydon Carter	Dopey Graydon Carter	Former editor of Vanity Fair
Anderson Cooper	Allison Cooper	Host of CNN's Anderson Cooper 360°
Chris Cuomo	Fredo	Former host of Cuomo Prime Time on CNN; Host of Cuomo on NewsNation
Maggie Haberman	Maggot Hagerman	American journalist, White House correspondent for The New York Times
Alex Jones	Bankrupt Alex Jones	Founder of Infowars; host of The Alex Jones Show
Megyn Kelly	Crazy Megyn	Host of The Megyn Kelly Show, former host of The Kelly File and Megyn Kelly Today
Seth Meyers	Marble Mouth Meyers	Host of Late Night with Seth Meyers
Bette Midler	Washed Up Psycho Bette Midler	Film Actress
Michael Moore	Sloppy Michael Moore	Filmmaker and political documentarian
Candace Owens	Crazy Candace Owens	Political commentator
Joe Scarborough	Morning Psycho	Co-host of Morning Joe; former U.S. representative from Florida; husband of Mika Brzezinski
Joe Scarborough	Psycho Joe	Co-host of Morning Joe; former U.S. representative from Florida; husband of Mika Brzezinski
George Stephanopoulos	Lil' George (Note: Trump has used "Liddle" as an alternative spelling of "Lil")	Chief anchor and chief political correspondent of ABC News; former White House communications director and senior advisor to President Bill Clinton
George Stephanopoulos	George Slopadopolus	Chief anchor and chief political correspondent of ABC News; former White House communications director and senior advisor to President Bill Clinton
Jake Tapper	Fake Tapper	Host of The Lead with Jake Tapper on CNN
Chuck Todd	Sleepy Eyes	Former moderator of Meet the Press
Katy Tur	Little Katy	Correspondent for MSNBC; author
Brian Williams	Lyin' Brian	Former anchor of NBC Nightly News; former host of The 11th Hour
Jeff Zucker	Little Jeff Zucker	Former president of CNN Worldwide

== Groups of people ==
Subject		Nickname(s)	Context/notes
Members		Nickname(s)	Context/notes
Names of attorneys: 1. Zainab Ahmad^{★}; 2. Greg Andres; 3. Rush Atkinson; 4. Ryan K. Dickey; 5. Michael Dreeben; 6. Kyle Freeny; 7. Andrew D. Goldstein; 8. Adam Jed; 9. Scott Meisler^{★}; 10. Elizabeth Prelogar; 11. James L. Quarles; 12. Jeannie Rhee; 13. Brian M. Richardson^{★}; 14. Brandon Van Grack; 15. Andrew Weissmann; 16. Aaron Zebley^{★}; 17. Aaron S. J. Zelinsky	Attorneys working on Robert Mueller's investigation of potential ties between the Trump campaign and Russia	13 Angry Democrats	The press identified thirteen of the seventeen attorneys as either being registered to vote as Democrats or making contributions to Democratic candidates. Those not identified as such are denoted with a star(^{★}). It is unclear whether this was the criterion Trump used to distinguish 13 out of 17 individuals since Trump did not detail which thirteen individuals he included in the nickname.
Names of attorneys: 1. Zainab Ahmad^{★}; 2. Greg Andres; 3. Rush Atkinson; 4. Ryan K. Dickey; 5. Michael Dreeben; 6. Kyle Freeny; 7. Andrew D. Goldstein; 8. Adam Jed; 9. Scott Meisler^{★}; 10. Elizabeth Prelogar; 11. James L. Quarles; 12. Jeannie Rhee; 13. Brian M. Richardson^{★}; 14. Brandon Van Grack; 15. Andrew Weissmann; 16. Aaron Zebley^{★}; 17. Aaron S. J. Zelinsky	Attorneys working on Robert Mueller's investigation of potential ties between the Trump campaign and Russia	17 Angry Democrats	The press identified thirteen of the seventeen attorneys as either being registered to vote as Democrats or making contributions to Democratic candidates. Those not identified as such are denoted with a star(^{★}). It is unclear whether this was the criterion Trump used to distinguish 13 out of 17 individuals since Trump did not detail which thirteen individuals he included in the nickname.
The Squad (2018–2021): Alexandria Ocasio-Cortez; Ilhan Omar; Ayanna Pressley; Rashida Tlaib	Informal political grouping of four Democratic members of the U.S. House of Representatives elected in 2018	AOC Plus 3 (Note: The nickname "AOC Plus 3" was originally coined by Laura Ingraham before Trump first used it days later.)	
Family of Joe Biden	Joe Biden, the 46th president of the United States, and his family	Biden crime family	
Freedom 250's Concert lineup: Morris Day; Young MC; Milli Vanilli; The Commodores; Martina McBride; Bret Michaels	Musical artists who were originally scheduled to perform at a series of concerts at the Great American State Fair	Third Rate Artists	It is unclear if the nicknames included artists who haven't dropped out from the lineup at the time of the posts, such as C+C Music Factory, who quietly canceled their appearance, Vanilla Ice, who later canceled his appearance citing "inclement weather", and Flo Rida, who eventually was the only artist of the original lineup who performed at the event.
Freedom 250's Concert lineup: Morris Day; Young MC; Milli Vanilli; The Commodores; Martina McBride; Bret Michaels	Musical artists who were originally scheduled to perform at a series of concerts at the Great American State Fair	Overpriced Singers	It is unclear if the nicknames included artists who haven't dropped out from the lineup at the time of the posts, such as C+C Music Factory, who quietly canceled their appearance, Vanilla Ice, who later canceled his appearance citing "inclement weather", and Flo Rida, who eventually was the only artist of the original lineup who performed at the event.
Stephen Colbert; Jimmy Fallon; Jimmy Kimmel; Seth Meyers	Hosts of various late-night talk shows	No Talent	Trump has attacked late-night talk show hosts over their negative views towards him, which are shown in their respective opening monologues
Stephen Colbert; Jimmy Fallon; Jimmy Kimmel; Seth Meyers	Hosts of various late-night talk shows	Untalented Late Night Sweepstakes	Trump has attacked late-night talk show hosts over their negative views towards him, which are shown in their respective opening monologues
Stephen Colbert; Jimmy Fallon; Jimmy Kimmel; Seth Meyers	Hosts of various late-night talk shows	Zero Talent	Trump has attacked late-night talk show hosts over their negative views towards him, which are shown in their respective opening monologues

== Other people ==
Personal name	Nickname	Notes
Jeff Bezos	Jeff Bozo	Businessman, former president and CEO of Amazon
Tim Cook	Tim Apple	Businessman, former CEO of Apple
Stormy Daniels	Horseface	Pornographic actress whom Trump paid to cover up an alleged affair
Mac Miller	Little Mac Miller	Rapper; released the song "Donald Trump" in 2011, which caused Trump and Miller to feud for years, with Trump demanding royalties since Miller used his name
Lord Sugar	Dopey Sugar	British business magnate and politician; host of the BBC reality competition series The Apprentice
Brigitte Macron	Sweetheart	First Lady of France
Asim Munir	Favorite Field Marshal	Chief of the Army Staff of Pakistan

== Organizations ==
Subject		Nickname(s)
Official name	Background	Nickname(s)
Americans for Prosperity	Libertarian conservative political advocacy group	Americans for No Prosperity
Club for Growth	Conservative organization	Globalist's Club for NO Growth
CNN	Multinational cable news channel owned by Skydance Corporation	Clinton News Network (Note: The nickname has been in use since at least 2007.)
CNN	Multinational cable news channel owned by Skydance Corporation	Fake News CNN (Note: Hillary Clinton has been credited with using the term "Fake News" prior to Trump. She was documented to have used the term on December 8, 2016, in what was believed to have been a reference to the Pizzagate conspiracy theory. Trump was documented to have first used the term on January 11, 2017.)
CNN	Multinational cable news channel owned by Skydance Corporation	Low ratings CNN
Democratic Party	American political party	Democrat Party (Note: Not original to Trump. See the article Democrat Party (epithet) for more details about the use of the term as an epithet.)
Democratic Party	American political party	Radical Left Democrats
Democratic Party	American political party	Dumocrats
Forbes	American business magazine	Failing Forbes Magazine
The Lincoln Project	Political action committee which opposes Trumpism	Lincoln Pervert Project
MS NOW (formerly MSNBC)	American news-based pay television cable channel owned by Versant	MSDNC
The New York Times	Newspaper	Failing New York Times
The Wall Street Journal	American business newspaper	The China Street Journal
The Washington Post	Newspaper owned by Jeff Bezos, founder and former CEO of Amazon	Amazon Washington Post
The Washington Post	Newspaper owned by Jeff Bezos, founder and former CEO of Amazon	The Washington ComPost
United States House Select Committee on the January 6 Attack	A select committee of the U.S. House of Representatives to investigate the attack on the U.S. Capitol on January 6, 2021	Unselect Committee
Comcast	American multinational telecommunications and media conglomerate	Concast
ABC News	News division of ABC owned by the Walt Disney Company	ABC Fake News

== Television programs ==
Official name	Nickname	Notes
Face the Nation	Deface the Nation	A weekly political talk show on CBS
Meet the Press	Meet the Fake Press	A weekly talk show on NBC
Meet the Press	Meet the Depressed	A weekly talk show on NBC

== Other ==
Common name	Nickname	Notes
Artificial Intelligence (AI)	Super Intelligence (SI)	Capabilities of computational systems to perform tasks associated with human intelligence. First proposed via a poll as "Superior Intelligence". Renamed by executive order 14434 during his second administration.
Donald Trump	A very stable genius	Self-epithet, antonomasia. Trump repeatedly described himself as "a very stable genius" from 2018 through 2019. A Very Stable Genius, a 2020 book by Philip Rucker and Carol Leonnig about Trump's first presidency used the nickname.
Donald Trump	Your favorite president	Often used in Truth Social posts.
Donald Trump	The GOAT	Often used in Truth Social posts.
Donald Trump	The Number One Attraction Anywhere in the World	Often used in Truth Social posts.
Gender-affirming surgery	Transgender mutilization [sic]	A surgical procedure that alters a person's look and characteristics to match their gender identity. Often used when mentioning gender-affirming care for minors.
Green New Deal	Green New Scam	A congressional resolution sponsored by Rep. Alexandria Ocasio-Cortez and Sen. Ed Markey that addressed climate and economic policy.
Gulf of Mexico	Gulf of America	Renamed by executive order 14172 during his second administration.
Lake Ontario	Lake America	Renamed by executive order 14422 during his second administration.
New Mexico	New America	Proposed name for the state in Truth Social posts during his second presidency; New Mexico officials rejected the suggestion.
Nuclear power and nuclear weapons	The N-Word	The use of nuclear fission or nuclear fusion as an explosive device, or to generate heat and electricity; typically referred to as simply "nuclear" by Trump.
Atlantic Ocean	Trump Ocean	Proposed name for any of the oceanic divisions during his second administration.
Pacific Ocean	Trump Ocean	Proposed name for any of the oceanic divisions during his second administration.
Russian interference in the 2016 United States elections	Russia, Russia, Russia Hoax	Dismissal of investigations that concluded that the Russian government conducted electoral interference in the 2016 elections. The palilogy of the phrase reportedly comes from "Marcia, Marcia, Marcia" a phrase used by Jan Brady, portrayed by Eve Plumb, in the TV series The Brady Bunch.
SARS-CoV-2	Kung Flu	The virus which causes COVID-19, the first case of which was diagnosed in China.
SARS-CoV-2	Chinese Virus	The virus which causes COVID-19, the first case of which was diagnosed in China.
SARS-CoV-2	China virus	The virus which causes COVID-19, the first case of which was diagnosed in China.
Strait of Hormuz	Trump Strait	Proposed name for the strait during the Strait of Hormuz crisis.
United States of America	The Hottest Country/Nation Anywhere in The World	Used to tout his achievements during his second administration.
Canada	51st state	Used multiple times in his second administration
Greenland	51st state	Used multiple times in his second administration
Venezuela	51st state	Used after capturing Nicolas Maduro.
China	Chief-ripper-off-er	Used to describe Chinese trade policy during the China–United States trade war.

== See also ==
- List of nicknames used by George W. Bush
- List of nicknames used by Huey Long
- List of nicknames of presidents of the United States
- Rhetoric of Donald Trump
