= Legal teams involved in the Mueller special counsel investigation =

The 2017–2019 Special Counsel investigation involved multiple legal teams, specifically the attorneys, supervised by Special Counsel Robert Mueller, taking part in the investigation; the team representing President Trump in his personal capacity; and the team representing the White House as an institution separate from the President.

According to CNN, as of August 2018, the Mueller team included 15 attorneys, led by Mueller. The additional supporting staff brings the number over 30.

Emmet Flood heads a team representing the White House, and Trump personally is represented by Jay Sekulow, Andrew Ekonomou, Rudy Giuliani, the Raskin & Raskin law firm, and Joanna Hendon. Former members of this team include white-collar crimes expert John Dowd and Ty Cobb representing the office of the presidency.

Mueller's legal team has been consistently attacked as biased against President Trump, who has repeatedly referred to it as "The 13 Angry Democrats". Mueller, though, is a registered Republican, and choosing to hire or not hire career attorneys on the basis of political affiliation is contrary to both Justice Department policy and federal law.

== Mueller and investigation team ==
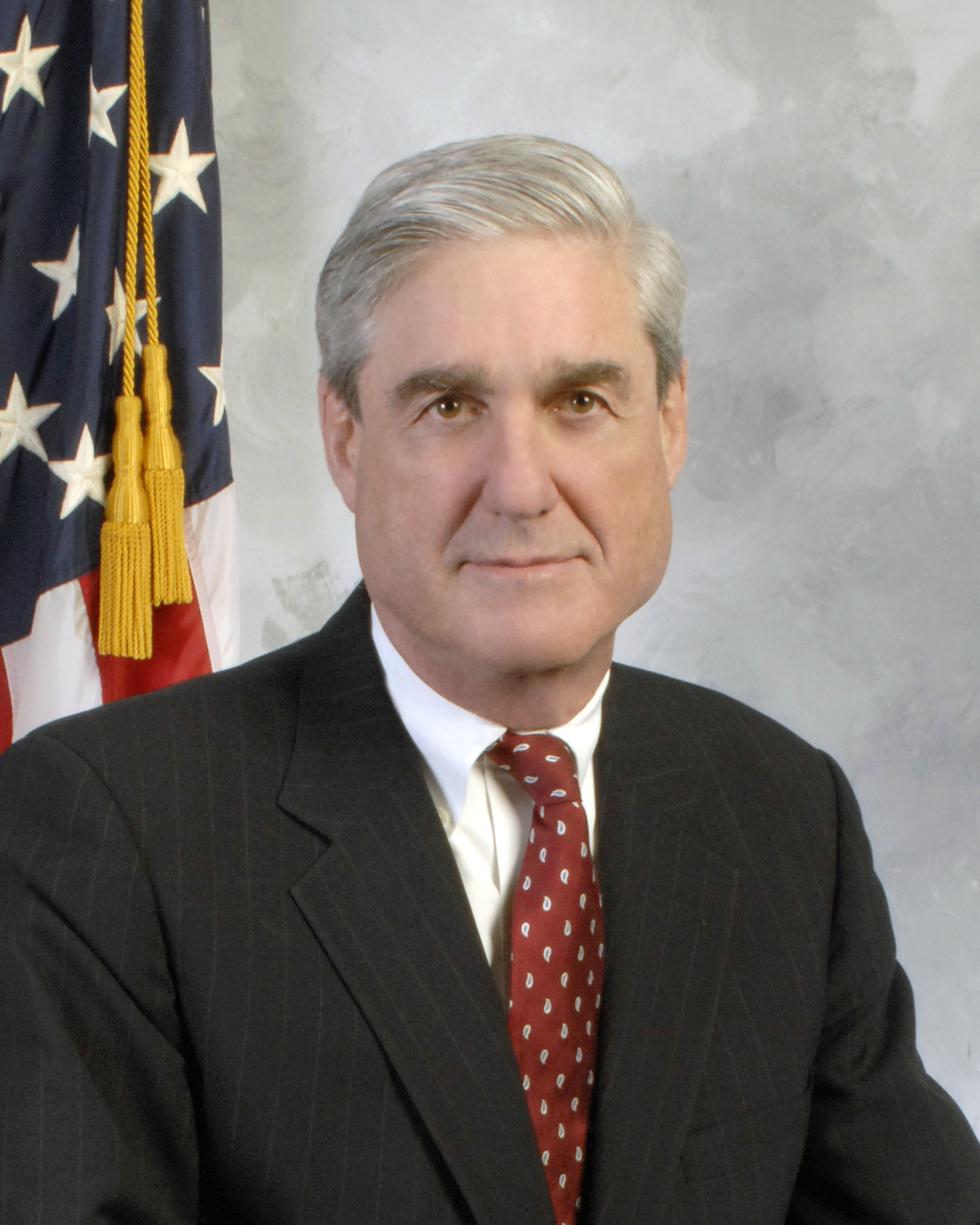
Special Counsel and former FBI Director Robert Mueller

Upon his appointment as special counsel, Mueller resigned his position at the Washington office of law firm WilmerHale, along with two colleagues, Aaron Zebley and James L. Quarles III. On 23 May 2017, the U.S. Department of Justice ethics experts announced they had declared Mueller ethically able to function as special counsel.

Politico proposed that the "ideal team" would likely have six to eight prosecutors, along with administrative assistants and experts in areas such as money laundering or interpreting tax returns. Mueller had hired 17 lawyers by February 2018, and had a total staff of over three dozen, including investigators and other non-attorneys by August 2017. He also has an active role in managing the inquiry.

=== Attorneys ===
- Zainab Ahmad: assistant United States Attorney for the Eastern District of New York, specializing in terrorism cases; "concluded her detail" under Mueller in March 2019 "but [would] continue to represent the office on specific pending matters that were assigned to her during her detail."
- Heather Alpino: Previously at the Counterintelligence and Export Control Section of the DOJ National Security Division.
- Greg Andres: former Deputy Assistant Attorney General, managed foreign bribery division
- Uzo Asonye: Deputy Chief of the Financial Crimes and Public Corruption office at the United States District Court for the Eastern District of Virginia.
- Rush Atkinson: trial attorney in the DOJ fraud section
- Deborah Curtis: Deputy Chief of the Counterespionage Section at the DOJ's National Security Division
- Michael Dreeben: Deputy Solicitor General, who oversees the Justice Department's criminal appellate docket; an expert in criminal law
- Andrew D. Goldstein: former leader of the public corruption unit, United States Attorney for the Southern District of New York
- Adam Jed: attorney in the DOJ Civil Division, appellate section
- Jonathan Kravis: previous experience prosecuting public corruption
- Michael Marando: Assistant United States Attorney in the District of Columbia who assisted the Mueller Team in prosecuting long time Trump advisor Roger Stone
- Robert Mueller: symbolic team leader; Special counsel for the United States Department of Justice
- Elizabeth Prelogar: appellate attorney with the Solicitor General's office; fluent in Russian; former law clerk to Justices Ruth Bader Ginsburg and Elena Kagan
- James L. Quarles III: former assistant special prosecutor on the Watergate Special Prosecution Force
- Kathryn Rakoczy: prosecutor focusing on violent street crimes.
- Jeannie S. Rhee: partner at WilmerHale, specializing in white-collar crime; a former Deputy Assistant Attorney General in the Justice Department's Office of Legal Counsel and Assistant United States Attorney for the District of Columbia
- Andrew Weissmann: chief of the DOJ Criminal Division's Fraud Section
- Aaron Zebley: former chief of staff to Mueller at the FBI and Deputy Special Counsel of the investigation
- Aaron S. J. Zelinsky: an attorney on detail from the United States Attorney for the District of Maryland

=== Support personnel ===
- Jason Alberts: leading corruption investigator with the New York FBI office, formerly a political appointee of President George W. Bush in the Department of the Interior's solicitor's office
- David Archey: FBI agent, succeeded Peter Strzok as leader of the team's FBI contingent, previously part of the Hillary Clinton email investigation; left in Feb-Mar 2019 to become chief of the FBI's field office in Richmond, VA
- William Barnett: FBI agent investigating Michael Flynn
- Peter Carr: team spokesman, a veteran DOJ spokesman
- Francesco Corral: FBI supervisory special agent investigating cybersecurity aspects of the case, previously worked on foreign intelligence cybersecurity cases
- Brock W. Domin: FBI special agent, majored in Russian language and literature at Notre Dame, specialized in national security investigations and financial crimes
- Sherine Ebadi: FBI agent specialized in fraud, money laundering and identity theft
- Jennifer Edwards: accountant with the FBI since 2006, won the Attorney General's award in 2016 for her work on the DC-area Child Exploitation Task Force of the FBI
- Robert Gibbs: FBI agent since 2003, previously worked on Chinese espionage cases
- Walter Giardina: FBI agent and Marine veteran of the Iraq War
- Curtis Heide: FBI agent previously based in Chicago
- Omer Meisel: FBI agent since 1999 and former Securities and Exchange Commission investigator, previously worked on high-profile financial crime and public corruption cases

Mueller has also added unidentified agents of the IRS Criminal Investigations Division (also known as CI) to his team. The Daily Beast, referring to the CI division as one of the government's "most tight-knit, specialized, and secretive investigative entities," reported that Mueller had enjoyed working with CI agents when he was a government attorney.

Mueller's team is also working with the Attorney General of New York on its investigation into Manafort's financial transactions.

=== Former members ===
- Ryan K. Dickey: former assistant US attorney in the Eastern District of Virginia, veteran cyber prosecutor from the DOJ Computer Crime and Intellectual Property Section. Departure was first reported in August 2018.
- Kyle Freeny: attorney for the money laundering unit at the Department of Justice. Left mid-October 2018.
- Scott A. C. Meisler: appellate attorney with the DOJ Criminal Division. Left in December 2018.
- Lisa C. Page: DOJ trial attorney in the FBI's Criminal Division Organized Crime Section; formerly an attorney in the office of the FBI general counsel. Her removal from the team was reported in late September 2017.
- Brian M. Richardson: clerked for Supreme Court Justice Stephen Breyer, the US district court in Brooklyn and the 2nd US Circuit Court of Appeals. His departure was first reported in August 2018.
- Peter Strzok: FBI counterintelligence investigator. Strzok was removed from the team in late July 2017 for exchanging anti-Trump and pro-Hillary Clinton text messages with his colleague Lisa Page. Strzok was later fired from the FBI.
- Brandon Van Grack: United States Department of Justice National Security Division Prosecutor. His departure was first reported in October 2018.

=== Personnel affiliations ===
Though Trump and others have criticized the fact that many members of Mueller's team have had some affiliation with the Democratic Party, federal regulations prohibit Mueller from considering political affiliation in hiring decisions. Republican members of the House of Representatives have accused the investigation of being staffed by personnel with an "anti-Trump" bias who "let Clinton off easy last year", in reference to the FBI's investigation of Hillary Clinton's email server, which also contradicts the stated reason for Trump's firing of James Comey.

=== Investigation expenses ===
As of December 2018, the total cost of the investigation has been approximately $25 million, while gaining approximately $48 million. More than half of the cost of the investigation was for personnel compensation and benefits. The gains were accrued primarily by uncovering unpaid taxes by targets in the investigation, seizing assets, and collecting fines. The attorneys have taken significant cuts in pay to work on the investigation, with their normal salaries "ranging from just under $1 million (for Zebley) to about $4.1 million (for Quarles)". Their current salaries "range from $105,782 to $187,000".

== Trump's legal team ==
Trump's lead attorney Rudy Giuliani disclosed on 13 September 2018 that Trump's and Manafort's legal teams have had a joint agreement through which they've exchanged confidential information "all during the investigation".

Members of President Trump's legal team include:

=== Representing the White House ===
- Emmet Flood: Flood served as a Special Counsel during the George W. Bush administration and represented Bill Clinton during his impeachment process. On 2 May 2018, he was named to replace Ty Cobb, who said he would remain with the team for a brief transition period. Flood is a partner at Williams & Connolly.

=== Representing Trump personally ===
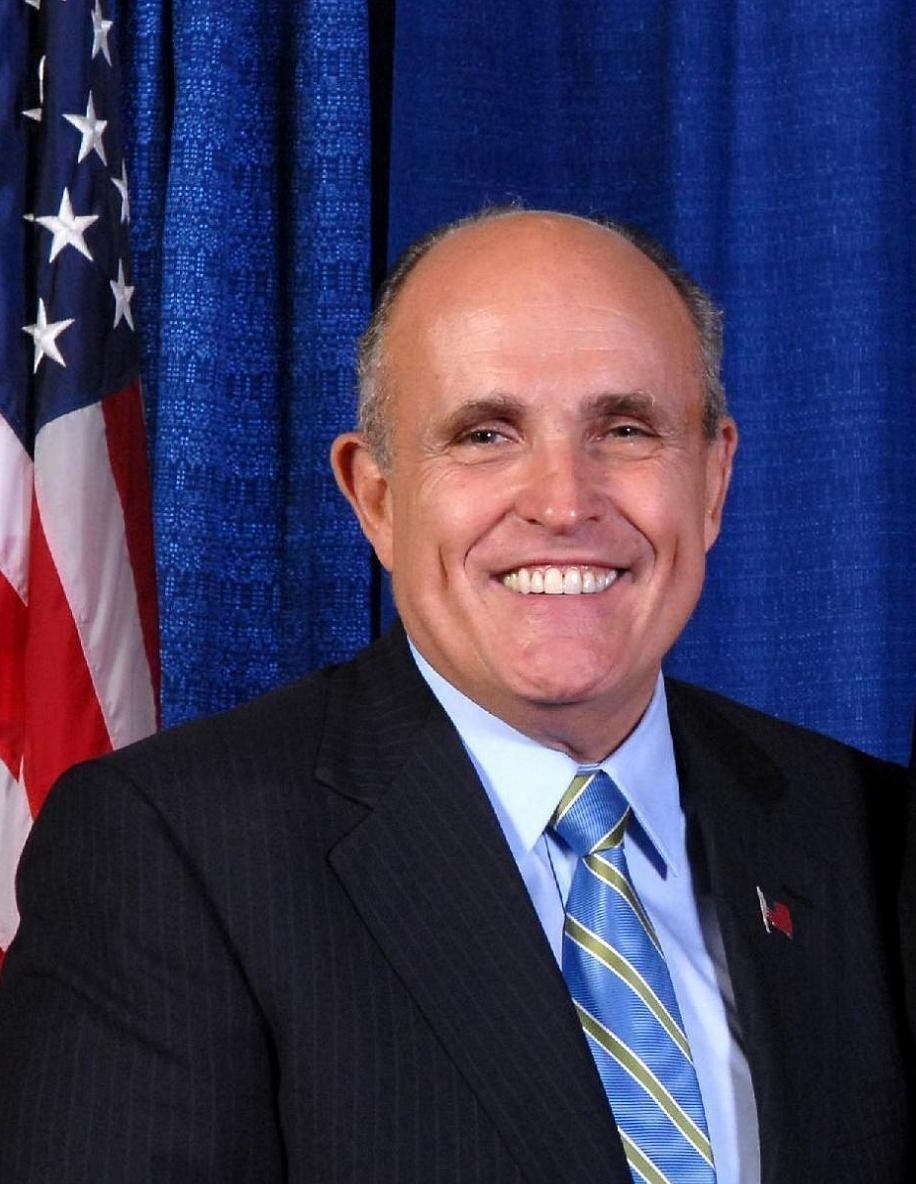
Rudy Giuliani

- Andrew Ekonomou: a former prosecutor with a doctorate in medieval history; joined March 2018.
- Rudy Giuliani: former mayor of New York City and United States Attorney for the Southern District of New York. Joined 19 April 2018.
- Joanna Hendon: criminal defense lawyer at New York–based firm Spears & Imes; represents Trump in the matter involving the raids on Trump's personal attorney Michael Cohen. Joined April 2018.
- Jane Serene Raskin and Martin R. ("Marty") Raskin: former federal prosecutors, now principals of Raskin & Raskin, a Coral Gables, Florida law firm emphasizing white collar criminal defense. Joined 19 April 2018.
- Jay Sekulow: the chief counsel at the American Center for Law & Justice, a conservative, Christian-based social organization. Joined in June 2017.

=== Former members of the President's legal team ===
- Michael J. Bowe: an attorney at Marc Kasowitz's firm
- Ty Cobb: a white-collar crime lawyer; was on White House staff representing the office of the presidency and was not on Trump's personal legal team. He joined in June 2017 and announced on 2 May 2018, that he would leave the team with the appointment of Emmet Flood to replace him. Cobb's last day was 18 May 2018.
- Mark Corallo, spokesman for Kasowitz and the White House; resigned on 20 July 2017.
- John M. Dowd, former leader of the team; joined in June 2017; resigned on 22 March 2018.
- Marc Kasowitz, Trump's personal attorney and the first member of the team; resigned on 20 July 2017.

=== Prominent lawyers and law firms that have declined offers to join Trump's legal team ===
In an article describing the "unique circumstance" of Rudy Giuliani's unpaid leave of absence from Greenberg Traurig while representing Trump, possibly because of "potential conflicts", Christine Simmons referred to how some other law firms may have turned down representing Trump in the Russia case due to "public relations headaches or business and recruitment concerns". Trump has called such views a "Fake News narrative", but, according to Ryan Lovelace of The National Law Journal, "many Washington defense attorneys aren't so sure".

A number of prominent lawyers and law firms are known to have declined offers to join Trump's legal team, including Robert S. Bennett of Hogan Lovells, Paul Clement and Mark Filip, both with Kirkland & Ellis, Robert Giuffra Jr. of Sullivan & Cromwell, Theodore B. Olson of Gibson, Dunn & Crutcher, and Brendan V. Sullivan Jr. of Williams & Connolly. Other firms with attorneys who have declined to represent Trump include Quinn Emanuel Urquhart & Sullivan, Steptoe & Johnson, and Winston & Strawn. Former U.S. Attorney Joseph diGenova and his wife Victoria Toensing were also briefly slated to join Trump's legal team, but withdrew their services from Trump in March 2018, citing conflicts of interest.

== Others ==
- Michael Cohen, Trump's former long-time personal attorney, who is fully cooperating with the Special Counsel and admitted to violating campaign finance laws, is represented by Lanny Davis.
- James Comey, whose assertions regarding statements made by Trump are central to the investigation, has a legal team including former independent counsel Patrick Fitzgerald.
- Paul Manafort, a key player in the allegations of improper contact between then-candidate Trump and the Russian government, is represented by Kevin Downing. Trump's and Manafort's legal teams have had a joint agreement through which they've exchanged confidential information "all during the investigation".

== See also ==
- Mueller special counsel investigation
- Special prosecutor
- Russian interference in the 2016 United States elections
