= Joe Hidin' =

Joe Hidin' or Joe Hiding may refer to:

- A pejorative nickname used by Donald Trump to refer to Joe Biden
- A misspelling of Joseph Haydn, (1732 – 1809), Austrian composer
