= Where Law Ends =

2020 non-fiction book by Andrew Weissmann

Where Law Ends: Inside the Mueller Investigation
- First edition cover
- Author: Andrew Weissmann
- Cover artist: Greg Mollica
- Language: English
- Subject: Investigation of Russian interference in the 2016 presidential election campaign
- Genre: Nonfiction
- Publisher: Random House
- Publication date: September 29, 2020
- Publication place: United States
- Media type: Print (hardback), Kindle
- Pages: 402
- ISBN: 978-0-593-13857-1

Where Law Ends: Inside the Mueller Investigation is a best-selling non-fiction book written by Andrew Weissmann, a former Assistant United States Attorney (AUSA), and later a General Counsel of the Federal Bureau of Investigation from 2011 to 2013. Released by Random House on September 29, 2020, the widely read book gives an insider's view into Department of Justice special counsel Robert Mueller's highly controversial investigation of Russian interference in the 2016 presidential election of Donald Trump.

== Synopsis ==
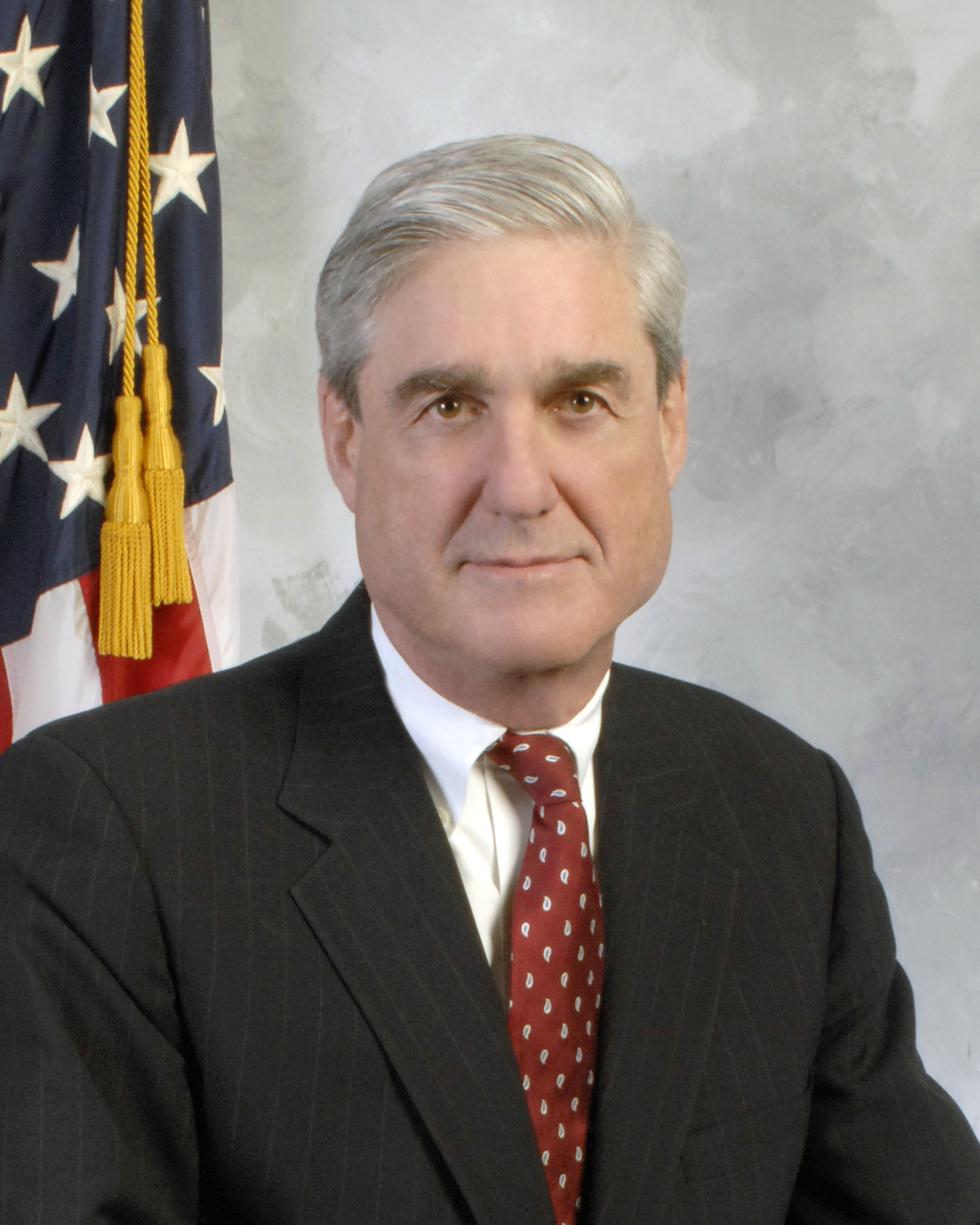
Robert Mueller

In May 2017, Robert Mueller led an investigation into Russian interference in the 2016 presidential election which evaluated the effect of Russians exerting influence in the campaign of Donald Trump, considered the possibility of collusion, and explored the potential for an obstruction of justice charge against the President and several of his staff. Former FBI director Mueller, a registered Republican, acting as Special Counsel, led a group of prosecutors, predominantly registered as Democrats, and, for the next 22 months, their investigation was followed with intense interest by the American public and diverse media until the publication of their report in April 2019.

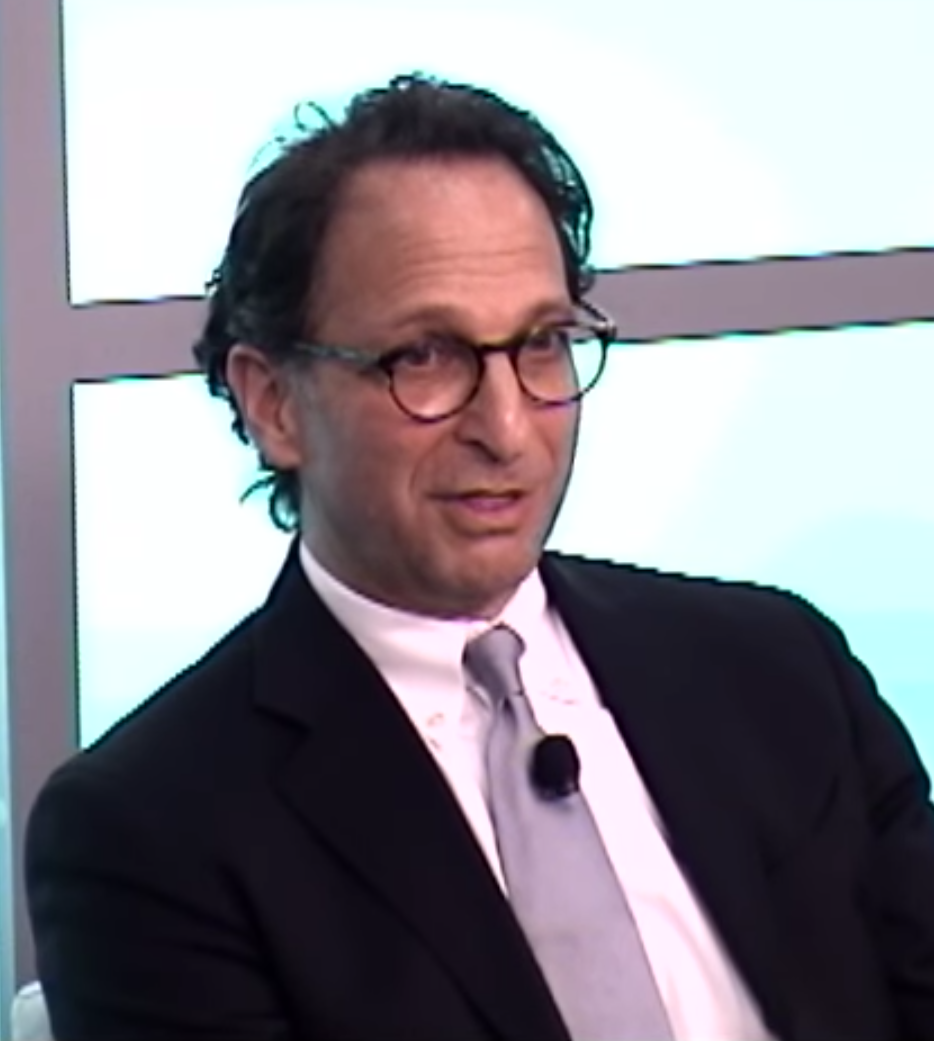
Weissmann, 2014

In Where Law Ends, Weissmann reveals what went on inside the investigation, including the internal team conflicts, difficult decisions, and mistakes made by the investigators. He also describes the stress caused by what he personally viewed as the efforts of President Trump and Attorney General William Barr to divert the direction of the investigation and ultimately mold the results of the published report to their own political ends. Others have differed with Weissmann's views on whether the President or Attorney General intentionally intended to divert the direction of the investigation.

Weissmann places the reader inside the Department of Justice where the team made the decisions that most affected the outcome and impact of the special counsel's report, including whether to subpoena the president, whether he could be required to submit his taxes to expedite a full financial investigation, and whether to bring obstruction charges.

=== Compromising meetings with Russians ===
Of exceptional importance in Weissmann's book was the testimony given to the FBI by Paul Manafort, who briefly served as President Trump's 2016 campaign manager. Manafort testified to the FBI that during the 2016 campaign he gave important 2016 polling data on battleground states to Konstantin Kilimnik, cited by the FBI as having links to Russian intelligence. The FBI's determination of Kilimnik's status as a Russian agent was reported by the New York Times, and later relayed to the Senate Intelligence Committee. Kilimnik had been a former co-worker of Manafort when he managed the 2010 campaign of Ukrainian President Viktor Yanukovych. Manafort renewed his relationship with Kilimnik during the 2016 campaign.

As Weissmann was the lead prosecutor in the investigation of Manafort, Manafort's connection with Russian intelligence became a critical aspect of his investigation. Weissmann was aware the FBI had determined that Kilimnik was a "known Russian Intelligence Services agent implementing influence operations on their behalf." Weissmann noted that campaign aid Rick Gates also testified Kilimnik had received polling data, given to Kilimnik at the instruction of Manafort. Reinforcing Weissmann's conclusion that Manafort gave polling data to Kilimnik, Manafort admitted again in 2022 he gave the polling data to Kilimnik, though he denied that he knew at the time that the latter was a Russian agent.

=== Trump Tower meeting with Russians ===
As an important focus of the book, other meetings with Russians taken by Trump's team are also chronicled in the book, including the June 9, 2016 Trump Tower meeting with Donald Trump Jr., described as unfruitful, that by many accounts was taken with hopes that the Russians present could provide damaging opposition information on Hillary Clinton. An excerpt from an E-mail that set up the Trump Tower meeting from Rob Goldstone, a British journalist who had work ties to the Crocus Group, a real estate company, that according to Mueller's investigation had close ties to Putin and the Russian government, included the following, verifying that the meeting was likely set up by the Russian government to provide opposition information on presidential candidate Hillary Clinton; "The Crown prosecutor of Russia...offered to provide the Trump campaign with some official documents and information that would incriminate Hillary and her dealings with Russia and would be very useful to your father. This is obviously very high level and sensitive information but is part of Russia and its governments support for Mr. Trump".

=== Hillary Clinton's mishandling of classified documents ===
Trump's insistence that Presidential candidate Hillary Clinton had mishandled classified files by putting them on her personal server was used effectively by candidate Trump to increase support from his base. Weissmann's book discussed in detail how individuals in the employ of Russian intelligence used sophisticated phishing techniques to illegally penetrate and hack the Democratic National Committee's server. The book noted that after an FBI investigation, Clinton was not indicted for mishandling classified files. Some of the files she handled on her server were certainly considered classified, although according to Attorney General James Comey, "Only a very small number of the emails containing classified information bore markings indicating the presence of classified information".

Nonetheless, Comey concluded "even if information is not marked 'classified' in an email, participants who know or should know that the subject matter is classified are still obligated to protect it." Clinton was also remiss in stating that none of the emails she handled were classified, though problems arose as very large numbers of emails and files were accessible on her server.

On October 28, 2016, eleven days before the election, Comey notified Congress that the FBI had started looking into newly discovered emails. On November 6, Comey notified Congress that the FBI had not changed its conclusion that she should not be indicted as she had shown no criminal intent, never hiding, destroying, exposing, or sharing classified documents with others. Press coverage of the FBI's renewed investigation so close to the election was believed to have harmed Clinton's candidacy in what would be a very close election. According to one journalist's views, Comey's timing was contentious, with critics saying that he had violated Department of Justice guidelines and precedent by making his announcement so close to an election, and prejudiced the public against Clinton.

=== Obstruction ===
Included among potential instances of obstruction, Weissmann discusses Trump's pardons, his numerous threats to discourage members of his staff from testifying, and at least one attempt by Trump to have his White House Counsel Don McGahn shut down the investigation and fire Mueller.

Weissmann described a total of ten separate potential acts of obstruction taken by President Trump and his aids and provided details on each as they appeared in the Mueller report. As noted later by Weissmann, Trump's promise to pardon those campaign aids convicted of crimes who may have refused to give complete information about Trump's knowledge or participation in Russian interference was made good on December 22–23, 2020, when George Papadopoulos, Roger Stone, Alex van der Zwaan, and Manafort were pardoned at the end of Trump's term. Weissmann considered the act of promising to pardon and then pardoning individuals charged in crimes that were associated with Trump's own role in the Russia investigation as "dangling pardons", a misuse of the presidential pardoning power, and as potentially a form of obstruction. Other sources, such as legal analyst Alan Dershowitz, have disputed, and will continue to dispute, whether the use of the power to pardon by Trump in this instance and others could be used to levy a charge of obstruction.

Weissmann also details the effects that President Trump himself had on the investigation, through his extending promises of pardons and his continuous threats to end the inquiry and fire Mueller. Weissmann wrote that he believed these actions caused the team to speed through the investigation without the security of knowing if it would have time to complete their task.

==== Release of redacted memo on obstruction, August 2022 ====
In August 2022, Weissmann also commented on the release of a newly unredacted March 24, 2019 memo read by Attorney General William Barr and used in his finding that the investigation was not adequate to indict the President on a charge of obstruction. The memo primarily addressed whether the President obstructed the Special Counsel's investigation. Questions might arise from the fact that the memo was not released without redactions until 2022. In a simplification of his summary, Barr used the legal logic that since he would recommend no conspiracy or collusion charge, that there could not be a charge of obstruction. Weissmann disputed this finding in his book and more recently, expressed his own legal view that Barr's legal conclusion on this point was clearly in error, as he did not believe a charge of obstruction was dependent on a charge of conspiracy or collusion. Special Prosecutor Mueller also was not fully in agreement with Barr on this issue, and though Mueller noted that a sitting president could not be indicted for a crime, this would not apply to an ex-President.

===== Trump instructing White House Counsel Don McGahn to fire Mueller =====
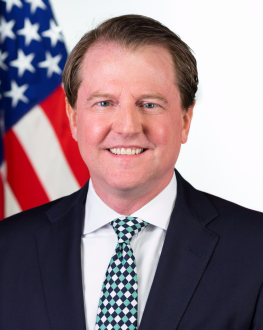
White House Counsel Don McGahn

A White House Special Counsel for Ethics and Government Reform during the Obama administration, Norman Eisen of the Brookings Institution, considered a liberal think tank, made his own case for obstruction. Eisen noted that "Mueller presented powerful evidence that Trump repeatedly told his first White House Counsel Donald McGahn to create a false written record stating he had never been ordered to fire Mueller. The Mueller report made a compelling case that these actions could support a reasonable inference of obstruction of justice."

Yet in the redacted and later unredacted memo from the Department of Justice which Barr used to make his conclusion of no obstruction, it was stated "none of these instances (of obstruction in the Mueller report) indicate that the president sought to conceal evidence of criminal conduct." Both Weissmann and Eisen reasonably took issue with this claim as Trump created a false record denying that he requested McGahn to fire Mueller. In fact, according to Weissmann's account, "[White House Staff Secretary Rob] Porter advised McGahn that the President had advised him (Staff Secretary Rob Porter) that he [McGahn] would be fired if he didn't write a memorandum for the White House files denying that Trump had ordered him to fire the Special Counsel (Mueller)." In September 2019, President Trump advised Staff Secretary Porter not to testify in response to his August subpoena from the House Judiciary Committee concerning Mueller's Russia investigation. Eisen pushed hard against the claim in the memo that "there are no comparable legal precedents to justify prosecution" in a case where obstruction is a stand-alone charge, and cited numerous examples of precedents.

=== Mueller Report summary ===
Weissmann noted in his book, he had concerns about the manner in which Attorney General William Barr ruled on the contents of the Mueller Report. Of considerable interest, on May 5, 2021, Judge Amy Berman Jackson of the United States District Court for the District of Columbia accused Attorney General Barr of "misleading her and Congress about advice he had received from top department officials on whether President Donald J. Trump should have been charged with obstructing the Russia investigation and ordered that a related memo be released.(this memo was released unredacted in 2022 and discussed above)." Judge Jackson strongly implied that Attorney General Barr had already decided not to prosecute Trump before seeking legal advice on the investigation from Justice Department officials, and further that he did not use his reading of the Mueller Report as a basis for his decision.

== Critical reviews ==
George Packer, the reporter for The Atlantic described the difficulties Weissmann's team faced including potential presidential pardons and that, "Manafort never stopped lying to Team M (Weissmann's Manifort team). His lies were encouraged by the president, who made sympathetic noises about Manafort with the suggestion that stonewalling might earn him a pardon. Trump's pardon power was an obstacle that the prosecutors didn't anticipate and could never overcome."

=== Criticism of Mueller ===
According to the book's review in the Washington Post, Weissmann believed "that part of the reason Mueller never found a critical mass of evidence against the president is because he was reluctant to scour Trump's financial history for misdeeds and links to Russia." Weissmann indicates Mueller might have more forcefully pursued Trump's financial records or pushed harder on obstruction charges. Nonetheless, when the book was released, Mueller felt it necessary to respond to Weissmann's criticism by stating, that "It is not surprising that members of the Special Counsel's office did not always agree, but it is disappointing to hear criticism of our team based on incomplete information."

=== Obstruction charges ===
Weissmann, by his own account in his book, took heat from critics for chiding co-worker Aaron Zebley and others who led Team 600 (Manifort investigation) on the investigation of obstruction charges for not taking a more assertive approach and accuses them of being overly cautious in not pushing harder for an indictment of obstruction against the President.

=== Flipping suspects ===
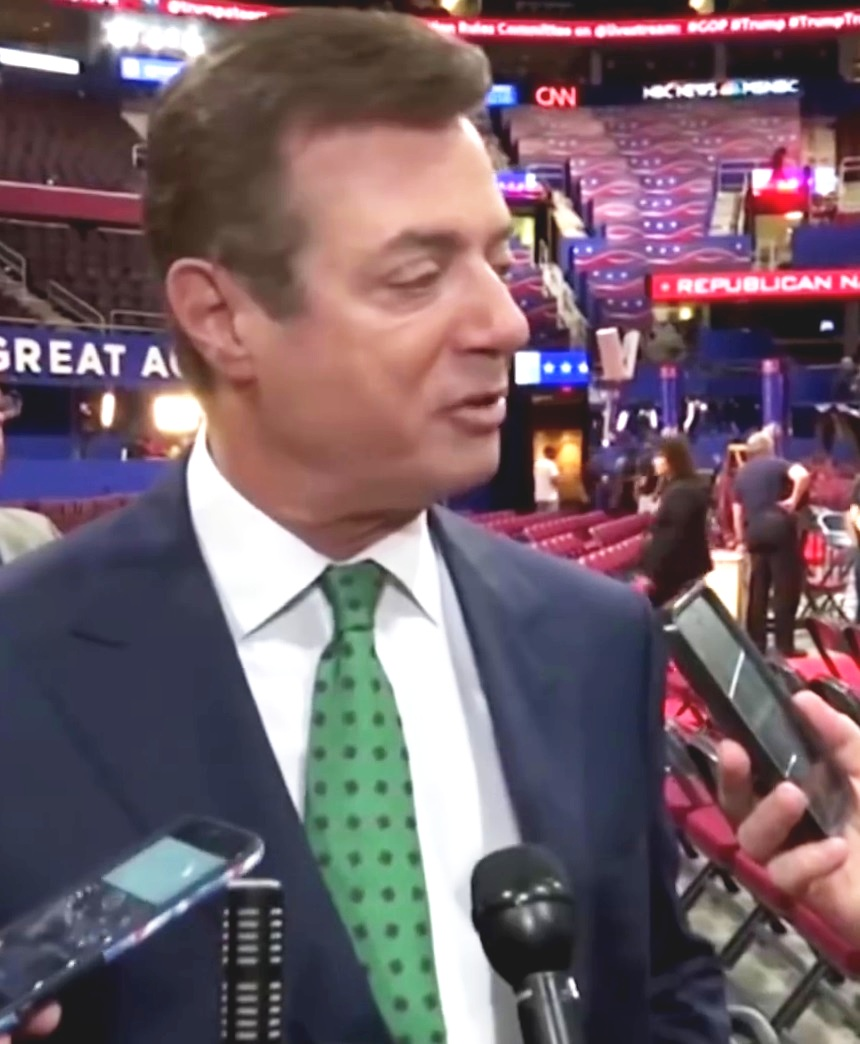
Paul Manafort, 2016

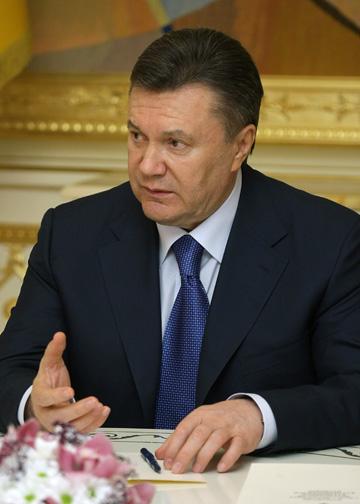
Yanukovych, 2010

In the case of Trump's 2016 campaign manager Paul Manafort, Weissmann found convincing evidence of tax fraud and tax evasion in Manafort's use of undeclared offshore accounts to hide a considerable portion of the 60 million he took in payment for working with a Russian backed Ukrainian oligarch and managing the 2010 election campaign of Ukrainian President Viktor Yanukovych. In the search of Manafort's residence, checks from the Ukrainian government were uncovered. According to the FBI's audits, two of the primary sources of Manafort's income in Ukraine were Oleg Deripaska, a Russian oligarch and industrialist with ties to Russian intelligence, and Victor Yanukovych a pro-Russian Ukrainian politician who Manafort worked to help elect President of Ukraine in 2010. Weismann details Manafort's work history and his connections to both men, as both are of considerable importance in understanding Paul Manafort's role in the book. Only after the FBI obtained evidence of widescale tax evasion through careful examination of Manafort's taxes and bank accounts, did Weissmann attempt to flip Manafort into revealing more about his or possibly the President's role in conspiring in the 2016 election campaign. Finding sufficient evidence to levy a charge of collusion against a sitting president proved a monumental task.

Of tantamount importance in understanding the direction of Weissmann' legal research, in 2018 Manafort plead guilty to several felonies including most significantly one count of tax conspiracy against the US (18 U.S.C #371), one count of failing to file with the Foreign Agent's Registration Act (FARA) and one count of conspiracy to obstruct justice due to attempts to tamper with witnesses.

In respect to his FARA violation, according to Weissmann's book Manafort should have known he needed to file with FARA, as he "was not only a longtime lobbyist but an attorney himself; he had extensive experience navigating the FARA rules and had gotten entangled with the FARA unit before. (In the eighties Manafort had a Presidential appointment in the Reagan administration, which normally would have prohibited him from working as a lobbyist but he'd requested a waiver from that aspect of the FARA rules)." His waiver was denied and Manafort resigned from his service with Reagan. Paul Manafort was never found guilty of a crime relating to collusion with Russian agents, though Weissmann's book examines in detail Manafort's association with Russians, likely justifying to most readers the reasons why an independent investigation was begun.

=== Public and legislative support ===
Devlin Barrett who reviewed the book for the Washington Post asked the critical and thought-provoking question, "If Mueller had done what Weissmann wanted — fought for a subpoena, accused the president of obstruction, sought Trump's tax records — is there really much reason to think the legislative and judicial branches would have backed such moves?" Though it is speculative, it seems feasible that a largely Republican controlled Senate may not have backed such actions.

== See also ==
- Russian interference in the 2016 United States elections
- The Case for Impeachment
- Dezinformatsia: Active Measures in Soviet Strategy
- Disinformation
- Steele dossier
- The KGB and Soviet Disinformation
- Timeline of Russian interference in the 2016 United States elections and Timeline of Russian interference in the 2016 United States elections (July 2016–election day)
- Trump: The Kremlin Candidate?
