= James Quarles =

James Quarles may refer to:

- James Minor Quarles (1823–1901), American politician from Tennessee
- James Thomas Quarles (1877–1954), American organist and educator
- James L. Quarles (born 1946), American lawyer and member of Watergate Special Prosecution Force
