= List of nicknames used by Huey Long =

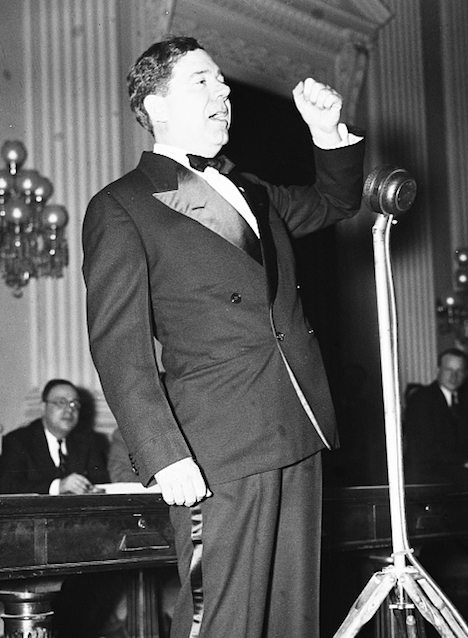
Long giving a speech in the U.S. senate

Throughout his political career, Huey Long used nicknames to refer to political opponents. He did this through speeches and cartoons in the Louisiana Progress.

== People ==
- Oscar K. Allen – OK Allen
- Marshall Ballard – Lie-to-'em Ballard
- William H. Bennett – Sack of Potatoes
- Hiram Wesley Evans – Imperial Bastard
- John D. Ewing – Squirt, Clown Prince of the Bow Wow Dynasty
- James Farley – Nabob of New York
- Col. Robert Ewing – Colonel Bow Wow, Buck
- Alvin Howard – Kinky
- Harold L. Ickes – Chinch bug of Chicago
- Hugh S. Johnson – Sitting Bull Johnson
- Leonard Nicholson – Liverwurst
- John M. Parker – John Mistake Parker, White Wings, Old Sack of Bones
- Esmond Phelps – Shinola, Desperate Esmond, Kingfish Phelps, Old Maid
- Joseph E. Ransdell – Feather Duster, Old Feather Duster, Old Trashy Mouth
- Charles Rightor – Whistle Britches, Old Whistle Britches
- Franklin D. Roosevelt – Prince Franklin, Knight of the Nourmahal, Roosevelt the Little
- Theodore Roosevelt – Roosevelt the Great
- Jared Y. Sanders Sr. – Old Buzzard Back
- Jared Y. Sanders Jr. – Little J.Y.
- John P. Sullivan – Bang Tail
- Lee Emmett Thomas – Wet Jug
- Henry A. Wallace – Ignoramus of Iowa
- T. Semmes Walmsley – Turkey Head Walmsley

=== Self-epithets ===
- Huey Long – Kingfish (from Amos 'n' Andy)

== Organizations ==
- Constitutional League (Louisiana) – League of Notions, Constipational League
- National Recovery Administration – National Racketeers Association, National Ruin Association, Nuts Running America, Never Roosevelt Again
- Times-Picayune – The Old Lady of Camp Street

== See also ==
- List of nicknames used by George W. Bush
- List of nicknames used by Donald Trump
