= Jonathan L. Goldstein =

American lawyer

U.S. Attorney for the District of New Jersey
- In office 1974–1977
- Preceded by: Herbert J. Stern
- Succeeded by: Robert J. Del Tufo

Personal details
- Born: February 16, 1941 (age 85)
- Children: Andrew
- Education: University of Pennsylvania (BA); New York University School of Law

Jonathan L. Goldstein (February 16, 1941) is an American lawyer who served as United States Attorney for the District of New Jersey from 1974 to 1977.

== Biography ==
Goldstein received his BS degree in economics from the Wharton School of the University of Pennsylvania in 1962 and his LLB degree from New York University School of Law in 1965.

From 1965 to 1969, he was a Special Trial Attorney for the U.S. Department of Justice. He joined the office of the United States Attorney for the District of New Jersey in 1969, serving as Assistant U.S. Attorney and then as First Assistant U.S. Attorney from 1971 to 1974.

After being nominated by President Richard Nixon, he was sworn in as U.S. Attorney in 1974, succeeding Herbert Stern, who had been appointed to serve as a federal judge on the District Court for the District of New Jersey. He served until 1977, resigning under what he called pressure from the Carter administration at the behest of U.S. Senator Harrison A. Williams. He was succeeded by Robert J. Del Tufo.

After leaving office, Goldstein joined the firm of Hellring Lindeman Goldstein & Siegal LLP. From 2006 to 2008, he served on Governor Jon Corzine's Advisory Committee on Police Standards.

His son is U.S. Attorney Andrew D. Goldstein.

Legal offices
Preceded by Herbert J. Stern	United States Attorney for the District of New Jersey; 1974 – 1977	Succeeded by Robert J. Del Tufo
