= Jack Rosen =

American lawyer and businessperson (born 1949)

- Born: 1949 (age 76–77); Germany
- Occupations: Chairman of the American Jewish Congress; Chairman of Rosen Partners LLC
- Spouse: Phyllis Rosen
- Children: Jordan Rosen; Daniel N. Rosen
- Parent(s): David Rosen, Sara Aisenberg

Jack Rosen (born 1949) is an American businessman, investor, philanthropist, and activist. He is chairman of the American Jewish Congress and chairman of the American Council for World Jewry. He is the Chairman of New York real estate firm Rosen Partners LLC.

== Biography ==
Rosen was born to a Jewish family in Germany in a displaced persons camp. His grandparents were killed in the Holocaust. He moved with his family to the United States when he was four years old, but the family returned to Germany for several years from when he was seven. The rest of his childhood took place in The Bronx borough of New York City, where he attended Columbus High School and later graduated from City University of New York with a degree in mathematics.

Rosen has received appointments by U.S. presidents from both parties. Under U.S. President Bill Clinton, he was a presidential appointee to the United States Holocaust Memorial Council, as well as a member of the NASA Advisory Council and other roles. He was a U.S. State Department delegate to the Organization of American States. He was later close enough to President George W. Bush to receive one of the president's famous nicknames: 'Rosey'.

In 2012, he partnered with Russian billionaire Mikhail Fridman to invest $1 billion in real estate projects along the East Coast.

In 2013, Congolese commodity trading and mining company Gécamines appointed Rosen to its Board of Directors.

== American Jewish Congress ==
As President of the American Jewish Congress (AJCongress), Rosen has been vocal as a Jewish community advocate and public figure. He has focused the organization's efforts on defending Israel and the rights of the Jewish people, as well as opposing anti-Semitism, the delegitimization of the State of Israel, and the BDS (Boycott, Divestment, and Sanctions) movement. He has also advocated for a range of political initiatives, and in 2019 led the push for the establishment of a Congressional Jewish Caucus. In early June 2019, a Black-Jewish Caucus was created in Congress.

=== International Mayors Conference ===
Rosen leads the International Mayors Conference, hosted by the American Jewish Congress in partnership with the Government of Israel, which brings together mayors from cities around the world in Israel. The 33rd International Mayors Conference took place in Israel in February 2019. Past participants include Mayor of New York City Bill de Blasio, President of El Salvador Nayib Bukele, President of Argentina Mauricio Macri, Premier of Taiwan William Lai, and former Prime Minister of Italy Matteo Renzi. The Mayors Conference also features prominent Israeli politicians and mayors, including Prime Minister Benjamin Netanyahu.

== Social activism ==
Rosen has advocated for Jewish and Israeli causes, having stated: "We are living in a post-Holocaust era and the forces that provided for a safe and secure Israel are changing. We have to look at what the future holds and have to use all the skills we’ve learned in America and that are available to us to ensure security for Jews around the world." He founded the American Council for World Jewry, an organization within the framework of the American Jewish Congress, that engages the Jewish people to work together to protect Jews and fight anti-Semitism. He is a trustee of the Park East Day School, the Park East Synagogue, and the Appeal of Conscience Foundation.

=== Writing ===
Over the years, Rosen has written extensively on topics pertaining to U.S. politics, Israel, the Jewish American community, and international relations. His op-eds have been published in several prominent American and Israeli publications, including Newsweek, New York Daily News, The Hill, The Jerusalem Post, The Times of Israel, The Washington Examiner, and Salon. In March 2019, Rosen coauthored an op-ed on the Pittsburgh synagogue shooting with Pittsburgh Mayor William Peduto.

== Personal life ==
He is married to Phyllis, and they have two adult children, Jordan and Daniel.
