= Turd blossom =

Texan United States term

"Turd blossom" is a Texan United States term for a flower which grows from a pile of cow dung.

The term gained fame in the United States in 2004 as a nickname that was reportedly assigned by former U.S. President George W. Bush as a term of endearment for his former chief political advisor, Karl Rove. In July 2005, several newspapers declined to run two Doonesbury comic strips portraying Bush addressing Rove by this nickname.
