= Floyd Abrams =

American attorney (born 1936)

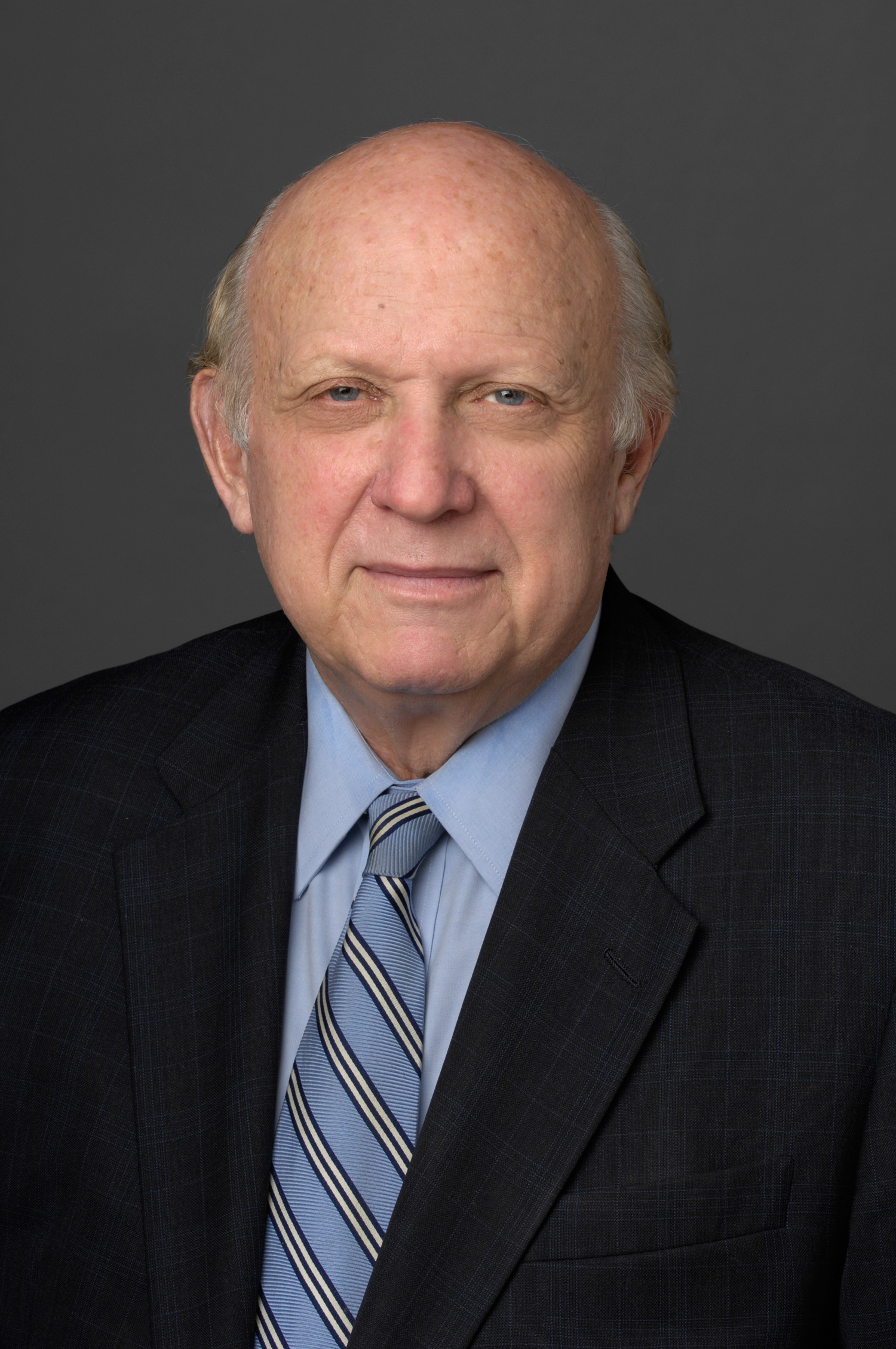
- Abrams in 2006
- Born: July 9, 1936 (age 90); New York City, U.S.
- Education: Cornell University (BA); Yale University (JD)
- Occupation: Attorney
- Employer: Cahill Gordon & Reindel
- Known for: First Amendment litigation
- Spouse: Efrat Surasky (m. 1963)
- Children: Dan Abrams; Ronnie Abrams
- Family: Elliott Abrams (cousin)

Floyd Abrams (born July 9, 1936) is an American lawyer. A member of Cahill Gordon & Reindel since 1963 and currently senior counsel. He has argued 13 First Amendment cases in front of the Supreme Court of the United States, more than any other attorney. Abrams was co-counsel to The New York Times in the 1971 Pentagon Papers case, and has represented Judith Miller in the CIA leak grand jury investigation, Standard & Poor's, and the Lorillard Tobacco Company (among others). He also represented Senator Mitch McConnell in the Citizens United 2010 Supreme Court case. Two of Abrams' clients had been on death row for crimes, and their convictions were overruled by the Supreme Court. A documentary was released about him in 2023 called Speaking Freely.

== Early life and education ==
Abrams was born in New York City on July 9, 1936, the son of Rae (née Eberlin) and Isadore Abrams. He is of Jewish descent. His first cousin is Elliott Abrams, President George W. Bush's deputy national-security advisor. He earned his undergraduate degree from Cornell University in 1956, and after trying to decide between a PhD in American History and law, he obtained his Juris Doctor from Yale Law School in 1960.

== Career ==
From 1961 to 1963, Abrams clerked for Judge Paul Conway Leahy of the United States District Court for the District of Delaware. Abrams joined Cahill Gordon & Reindel in 1963 and became a partner in 1970. He was also a Visiting Lecturer at Columbia Law School from 1981 to 1985. He was the William J. Brennan Jr. visiting Professor at the Columbia University Graduate School of Journalism.

He is the founder of the Floyd Abrams Institute for Freedom of Expression at Yale Law School and the recipient of numerous awards including the Freedom Forum's Free Expression Award, The Media Institute's Freedom of Speech Award, and the American Lawyer's Lifetime Achievement Award. He is also the namesake of the National Coalition Against Censorship's inaugural Floyd Abrams Award, which recognizes those who have advanced free speech.

Abrams is a member of the American Academy of Arts and Sciences.

His clients have included The McGraw-Hill Companies, ABC, NBC, CBS, CNN, Time Magazine, Business Week, The Nation, Reader's Digest, Hearst, AIG, and others.

He is the author of numerous books including Speaking Freely, The Soul of The First Amendment, and Friend of The Court.

He is the subject of the PBS - American Masters documentary Floyd Abrams: Speaking Freely, which was nominated for an Emmy.

== Personal life ==
Abrams lives in New York City with wife Efrat Surasky, who has Alzheimer's disease. Together they have a son, television host Dan Abrams; and a daughter, Judge Ronnie Abrams of the United States District Court for the Southern District of New York.

In 2008, Abrams played the role of Judge Hall in the movie Nothing but the Truth.

== Recognitions ==
- Presented with the Chambers and Partners' Lifetime Achievement Award in 2010.
- Recipient of the Freedom of Speech Award from The Media Institute in 2024.
- Honoree and recipient of the Inaugural Floyd Abrams Award by the National Coalition Against Censorship in 2024.
- Recipient of the Walter Cronkite Freedom of Information Award.
- Recipient of the Freedom Forum 2025 Free Expression Award.

== Selected publications ==
- Speaking Freely: Trials of the First Amendment, (Viking Press, 2005) ISBN 978-0-670-03375-1.
- Friend of the Court: On the Front Lines with the First Amendment, (Yale University Press, 2013) ISBN 978-0-300-19087-8.
- The Soul of the First Amendment, (Yale University Press, 2017) and ISBN 978-0-300-19088-5.

== See also ==
- Clearview AI
