= Cahill Gordon & Reindel =

American law firm

Cahill Gordon & Reindel LLP
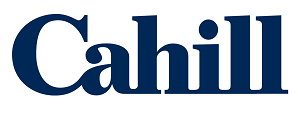
- Headquarters: 32 Old Slip; New York, New York 10005
- No. of offices: 4
- No. of attorneys: Approximately 350
- Major practice areas: Corporate, Litigation, Investigations, Crisis Advisory, Tax, Insurance, Antitrust, First Amendment, Bankruptcy & Restructuring, Environmental
- Revenue: ▲US $502.5 million (2025)
- Date founded: 1919
- Company type: Limited liability partnership
- Website: www.cahill.com

Cahill Gordon & Reindel LLP is an American law firm based in New York City with offices also in Washington, D.C. and London. Founded in 1919, it operates areas of capital markets and banking & finance.

== History ==
Cahill opened its doors at 120 Broadway in 1919 as McAdoo, Cotton & Franklin. In 1921 William G. McAdoo moved away to California, and the firm was renamed Cotton & Franklin. By the end of the Depression, it expanded to handle bankruptcies, reorganizations, and regulatory matters. During and after the Second World War, under the leadership of John T. Cahill, former United States Attorney for the Southern District of New York, the firm expanded further. As Cahill Gordon Reindel & Ohl, it moved to 80 Pine Street, where it remained until 2020, then it moved to 32 Old Slip. Partner John Ohl, a tax specialist, retired in 1976. The firm established its Paris office in 1928, though it closed in 2000 when the firm opened its London office. Today, Cahill maintains offices in London and Washington D.C, though its largest office by far is in New York City.

== Notable litigation ==
On behalf of Cahill, Floyd Abrams successfully defended The New York Times in the landmark New York Times Co. v. United States case. In that 1971 case the Supreme Court of the United States refused to permit the Nixon Administration to stop the publication of thousands of pages of Vietnam War-related government documents.

On September 9, 2009, Abrams argued before the Supreme Court on behalf of Senator Mitch McConnell in the re-argument ordered by the Court on the constitutionality of the McCain–Feingold Act, defending the rights of corporations and unions to donate unlimited amounts of money to political allies in Citizens United v. Federal Election Commission.

== Notable attorneys ==
- Floyd Abrams
- Michael F. Armstrong
- William A. Jacobson
- Ellen Weintraub
- Loretta Lynch (former United States Attorney General)
