= Ronnie Abrams =

American judge (born 1968)

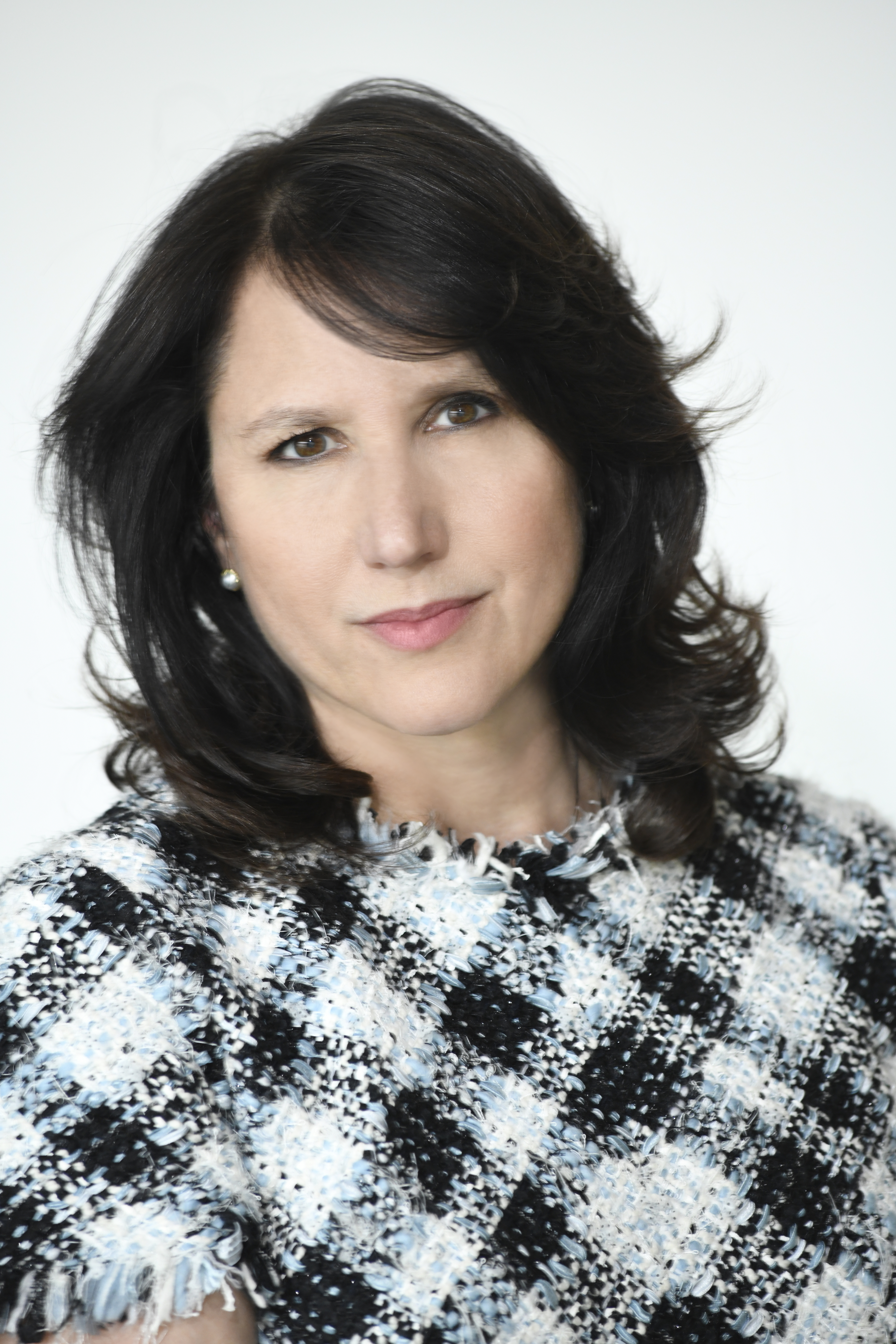

Judge of the United States District Court for the Southern District of New York
- Incumbent
- Assumed office March 23, 2012
- Appointed by: Barack Obama
- Preceded by: Lewis A. Kaplan

Personal details
- Born: 1968 (age 57–58) New York City, New York, U.S.
- Spouse: Greg Andres (m. 2001)
- Parents: Floyd Abrams (father); Efrat Abrams (mother)
- Relatives: Dan Abrams (brother); Elliott Abrams (cousin)
- Education: Cornell University (BA); Yale University (JD)

Ronnie Abrams (born 1968) is a United States district judge of the United States District Court for the Southern District of New York.

== Early life and education ==
Abrams was born in 1968 in New York City and was raised in the city. She is one of two children born to Efrat Abrams and Floyd Abrams, a First Amendment lawyer. Her brother, Dan Abrams, is an entrepreneur and a host of the Dan Abrams Live show on NewsNation.

Abrams earned a Bachelor of Arts from Cornell University in 1990. In 1993, she received a Juris Doctor from Yale Law School. After completing law school, she was a law clerk for Judge Thomas P. Griesa of the United States District Court for the Southern District of New York.

== Career ==
From 1998 to 2008, Abrams worked as a federal prosecutor in the Southern District of New York, where she was Chief of the General Crimes Unit from 2005 to 2007 and Deputy Chief of the Criminal Division from 2007 to 2008.

She received the United States Department of Justice Director's Award for Superior Performance for two cases. The first case involved the convictions of members of a Colombian gang wanted for the murder of a New York City police detective and some 100 armed robberies; the second case was for the convictions of leaders of the Bloods gang.

In 2008, Abrams returned to Davis Polk to run its pro bono program. She had previously worked at the firm as a litigation associate from 1994 to 1998. While at Davis Polk, Abrams was counsel to the New York State Justice Task Force, a task force created by New York State Chief Judge Jonathan Lippman to examine the causes of wrongful convictions and make recommendations for changes to safeguard against such convictions in the future.

Abrams was also an adjunct professor at Columbia Law School, where she teaches about investigating and prosecuting federal criminal cases.

=== Federal judicial service ===
Senator Kirsten Gillibrand recommended Abrams to fill a judicial vacancy on the United States District Court for the Southern District of New York. On July 28, 2011, President Barack Obama formally nominated Abrams to the Southern District of New York. She was nominated to the seat vacated by Judge Lewis A. Kaplan, who assumed senior status on February 1, 2011. The Senate Judiciary Committee held a hearing on her nomination on October 4, 2011, and reported her nomination to the floor on November 3, 2011. On March 22, 2012, the Senate confirmed Abrams by a 96–2 vote. She received her commission on March 23, 2012.

In 2015, Abrams, together with another judge, created and began to run the "Young Adult Opportunity Program," a judicially supervised pretrial program for non-violent young adults charged in the Southern District of New York. The Program provides young adult defendants with access to employment, counseling, and treatment resources. Program participants, if they are successful, may receive a shorter sentence, or even a reduction, deferral or dismissal of the charges against them. Abrams has also been involved in other criminal justice reform efforts, including the creation of reentry courts in her district.

=== Notable cases ===
In October 2013, Carmen Segarra filed suit against the Federal Reserve in an action Abrams presided over, alleging that she was terminated due to reporting to her superiors that the Goldman Sachs Group did not have a firmwide conflict-of-interest policy. Segarra alleged that her termination violated the whistleblower protection provisions of the Federal Deposit Insurance Act, 12 U.S.C. § 1831j. On April 3, 2014, Judge Abrams disclosed that her husband, Greg Andres, a partner at Davis Polk & Wardwell, represented Goldman Sachs. In April 2014, Abrams dismissed the suit. The Court of Appeals for the Second Circuit affirmed the dismissal, calling some of Segarra's arguments, "entirely speculative, meritless and frankly quite silly."

In 2016, Abrams was assigned to preside over a case in which Donald Trump and Jeffrey Epstein were accused by the plaintiff of having raped her in the 1990s, when the plaintiff was 13 years old. The complaint was voluntarily dismissed without prejudice by the plaintiff in September 2016.

In January 2017, Abrams was assigned to preside over a pending case in which Donald Trump was sued by a nonprofit group, Citizens for Responsibility and Ethics in Washington, over an alleged violation by Trump of the Foreign and Domestic Emoluments Clauses of the United States Constitution. On July 11, 2017, Abrams recused herself from the case when her husband, Greg Andres, began talks to join Special Counsel Robert Mueller's staff investigating Russian meddling in the 2016 election.

In April 2018, Abrams presided over the trial of an ex-U.S. Army Sergeant and two other men who were convicted of participating in a murder for hire of a woman in the Philippines. The primary cooperating witness was Paul Le Roux, a notorious crime lord who testified about the covert world of mercenary work as well as selling missile technology to Iran and smuggling weapons to rebels and warlords.

In June 2018, Abrams presided over a trial of individuals charged with helping run a scheme, masterminded by serial fraudster Jason Galanis, to defraud a Native American tribe and multiple pension funds through the issuance of $60 million worth of tribal bonds. The judge ordered a new trial for one of the men convicted, Devon Archer, concluding that it was not clear that Archer knew that the bond issue was fraudulent, or that he received any personal benefit from it. Abrams said she was thus “left with an unwavering concern that Archer is innocent of the crimes charged.” Archer's conviction was reinstated by the Court of Appeals for the Second Circuit, which clarified the standard for when a district court may grant a new trial, holding that it may not do so "based on the weight of the evidence alone unless the evidence preponderates heavily against the verdict to such an extent that it would be 'manifest injustice' to let the verdict stand." Archer and Hunter Biden were business partners, although Biden was not implicated in the scheme. A lawyer for Hunter Biden said that he cut ties with those involved when he learned of the conduct alleged. Archer was pardoned by President Trump on March 25, 2025.

In July 2018, Abrams presided over the trial in an action brought by Enrichetta Ravina, a former finance professor at Columbia University's Business School against Columbia and a more senior tenured professor, Geert Bekaert, for sex discrimination and retaliation. The jury found that Ravina had not been sexually harassed but that she had been retaliated against by Bekaert, who wrote at least 30 emails calling Ravina "evil" and "crazy," including to a number of industry players at the Federal Reserve Bank, top-tier universities and economic journals.

In May 2024, Abrams presided over the trial of Dr. Darius Paduch, a urologist specializing in male infertility and reproductive health at two prominent New York medical institutions who was convicted of sexually abusing multiple patients, including minors. According to a lawyer suing Paduch civilly, a total of 310 victims have come forward with allegations and lawsuits against Paduch, breaking the record of the most male victims abused by a single predator. On November 20, 2024, Abrams sentenced Paduch to life in prison, saying that “the damage that Dr. Paduch has done through his abuse and gaslighting is irreparable,” and that "he will always pose a danger to the community.”

In June 2026, Abrams presided over a defamation case against television host John Oliver by Iowa physician Brian Morley, whose statement on sanitation was quoted on Oliver's show Last Week Tonight in a segment on Medicaid managed care. Abrams dismissed the lawsuit, saying Oliver had used the proper context for Morley's quote.

== Personal life ==
Abrams and her husband, Greg Andres, formerly a partner at Davis Polk & Wardwell, were married in 2001 by Judge Loretta A. Preska. Greg Andres worked with Robert Mueller on the Special Counsel investigation.

== See also ==
- List of Jewish American jurists

Legal offices
Preceded by Lewis A. Kaplan	Judge of the United States District Court for the Southern District of New York; 2012–present	Incumbent
