= Aaron Zebley =

American lawyer

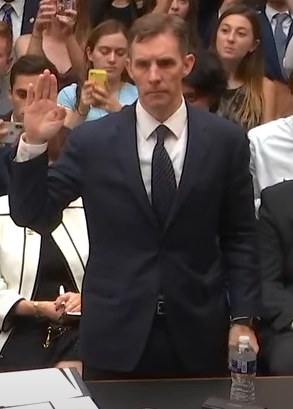
- Aaron Zebley being sworn in during Robert Mueller's House Intelligence Committee testimony on July 24, 2019

Deputy Special Counsel for the United States Department of Justice
- In office 2017–2019
- Special Counsel: Robert Mueller

Senior Counselor for the United States Department of Justice National Security Division
- In office February 2014 – March 2014

Chief of Staff of the Federal Bureau of Investigation
- In office September 2011 – December 2013
- Director: Robert Mueller

Personal details
- Born: 1969 or 1970
- Spouse: Catharine Easterly
- Education: College of William & Mary (BA); University of Virginia School of Law (JD)

Aaron Mortimer Zebley (born 1969 or 1970) is an American attorney and former FBI special agent who was the deputy special counsel of the Special Counsel investigation headed by Robert Mueller. He was the former chief of staff to Mueller at the FBI. Zebley followed Mueller from the Federal Bureau of Investigation to the law firm WilmerHale and also subsequently left when Mueller resigned to become the special counsel, along with James L. Quarles.

== Early life and education ==
Zebley graduated from the College of William & Mary magna cum laude and Phi Beta Kappa in 1992. He graduated from the University of Virginia School of Law in 1996. After working at Orrick, Herrington & Sutcliffe from July to December 1997, he would enter and graduate from the FBI Academy in 1998.

== Career ==
Zebley was an FBI special agent working for the bureau's Counterterrorism Division for seven years. As an FBI agent, Zebley investigated al-Qaeda's bombings of U.S. embassies in east Africa in 1998, and after the September 11 attacks was assigned to the FBI's PENTTBOM team, which investigated the terrorists responsible for the attacks. Zebley was on the arrest team that captured one of the embassy bombers, Khalfan Khamis Mohamed, in October 1999 in Cape Town, South Africa.

Zebley was one of the investigators who built the case against Zacarias Moussaoui, who was ultimately sentenced to life imprisonment. Zebley was a summary witness in Moussaoui's penalty proceeding, testifying to the ways in which Moussaoui's confession in 2005 could have helped track down the September 11 hijackers in the month before the attacks, had he provided truthful information when first arrested.

Zebley later joined the United States Department of Justice, where he was first an Assistant U.S. Attorney in the Alexandria, Virginia-based National Security and Terrorism Unit and later a senior counsel in the National Security Division, holding the position of senior counselor.

Zebley served as chief of staff to Robert Mueller when Mueller was Director of the FBI and in 2014 followed Mueller to the law firm WilmerHale, where he served as partner for three years. While in private practice at WilmerHale, Zebley was an expert in cybersecurity and represented a wide range of clients, including Justin Cooper, a former aide to Hillary Clinton, and the National Football League.

In May 2017, after Mueller was appointed as special counsel investigating Russian interference in the 2016 United States elections, Zebley resigned from WilmerHale to join the Special Counsel investigative team. Zebley rejoined WilmerHale in October 2019.

On June 2, 2021, the University of Virginia announced that Zebley would be teaching a course entitled "The Mueller Report and the Role of the Special Counsel" during the fall semester, along with former Special Counsel Robert Mueller and former Special Counsel's Office members James L. Quarles and Andrew D. Goldstein.

== See also ==
- Timeline of investigations into Trump and Russia (2019)
