= Zainab Ahmad =

American prosecutor (born 1980)

- Born: 1980 (age 44–45); New York City, New York, U.S.
- Education: Cornell University (BS); Columbia University (JD)

Zainab N. Ahmad (born 1980) is an American prosecutor with the United States Department of Justice who specializes in investigating and prosecuting terrorism. She served as an Assistant United States Attorney of the Eastern District of New York until 2017, successfully prosecuting several high-profile terrorism cases. In 2017, she was reassigned to the Special Counsel for the United States Department of Justice team.

== Early life, education, and clerkships ==
Born in New York City to parents who had emigrated from Punjab, Pakistan, Ahmad "grew up in suburban Nassau County, Long Island, with her father and stepmother", also spending time living with her mother in Manhattan, and spending summers in Pakistan and England. She initially planned to study hospital administration, majoring in health policy at the New York State College of Human Ecology at Cornell University, but after the September 11 attacks, she changed course. After receiving her B.A. from Cornell in 2002, she attended Columbia Law School, receiving her J.D. in 2005. She was a law clerk for Judge Jack B. Weinstein of the United States District Court for the Eastern District of New York, and for Judge Reena Raggi of the United States Court of Appeals for the Second Circuit.

== Prosecutorial career ==
Ahmad became a prosecutor for the United States Department of Justice in 2008, initially prosecuting gang activity in Brooklyn and Staten Island, but quickly moving to the prosecution of terrorists. In April 2013, she was appointed to the position of a deputy chief of the national security and cybercrime section in the Criminal Division of the U.S. Attorney's Office for the Eastern District of New York. Between 2009 and 2017, Ahmad prosecuted thirteen people charged with terrorism, winning every case. The New Yorker related:

Ahmad's specialty is counterterrorism, her subspecialty "extraterritorial" cases, which means that she spends a great deal of time overseas, negotiating with foreign officials, interviewing witnesses, often in prison, and combing the ground for evidence in terror-related crimes against Americans. She spends time in American prisons as well, typically with convicted jihadists. A former supervisor of Ahmad's told me that she has probably logged more hours talking to "legitimate Al Qaeda members, hardened terrorist killers," than any other prosecutor in America.

Terrorists prosecuted by Ahmad include:

- Alhassane Ould Mohamed, a Malian who murdered U.S. defense attaché William Bultemeier in Niamey, Niger, and was later involved in numerous other attacks and crimes. Mohamed pleaded guilty and in 2016 was sentenced to 25 years in prison.
- Russell Defreitas and Abdul Kadir, conspirators in the 2007 John F. Kennedy International Airport attack plot, who were convicted and sentenced to life imprisonment.
- Najibullah Zazi and Abid Naseer, conspirators in the 2009 New York City Subway and United Kingdom plot. Zazi pleaded guilty in 2010 but has not yet been sentenced, as he is cooperating with investigators. In 2015, Naseer was convicted by a jury and sentenced to 40 years in prison.
- Lawal Babafemi, a Nigerian Al Qaeda recruiter extradited to the United States. Babafemi pleaded guilty in 2014 and was sentenced to 22 years in prison the following year.

Ahmad also prosecuted Faruq Khalil Muhammad 'Isa, a Canadian national affiliated with ISIS charged with murdering five U.S. servicemen in a 2009 suicide bombing attack in Iraq. Muhammad 'Isa has pleaded not guilty and is awaiting trial. Ahmad also prosecuted Muhanad al-Farekh, an American charged with having provided material support to al Qaeda in Afghanistan. Al-Farekh has pleaded not guilty and is awaiting trial.

In the spring of 2016, Ahmad took a leave from the U.S. Attorney's Office in E.D.N.Y to work at Justice Department headquarters ("Main Justice"), at the request of Attorney General Loretta Lynch, dealing with transnational organized crime and international affairs. She returned to the E.D.N.Y. in April 2017, remaining there until July 2017, when she was selected by special counsel Robert Mueller to join the Special Counsel for the United States Department of Justice team assembled to probe Russian interference in the 2016 United States elections and related matters.

Ahmad was one of the team members responsible for handling the case against Michael Flynn, appearing in court on behalf of the Special Counsel for Flynn's plea bargain.

== Personal life ==
Ahmad "was briefly married, to a lawyer from Jordan" before getting divorced. Ahmad is a Muslim, and says that "the primary relevance of my ethnic background to the work I do is its irrelevance", citing the rejection of terrorism by "the broader American-Muslim community".
