= Andrew Weissmann =

American attorney (born 1958)

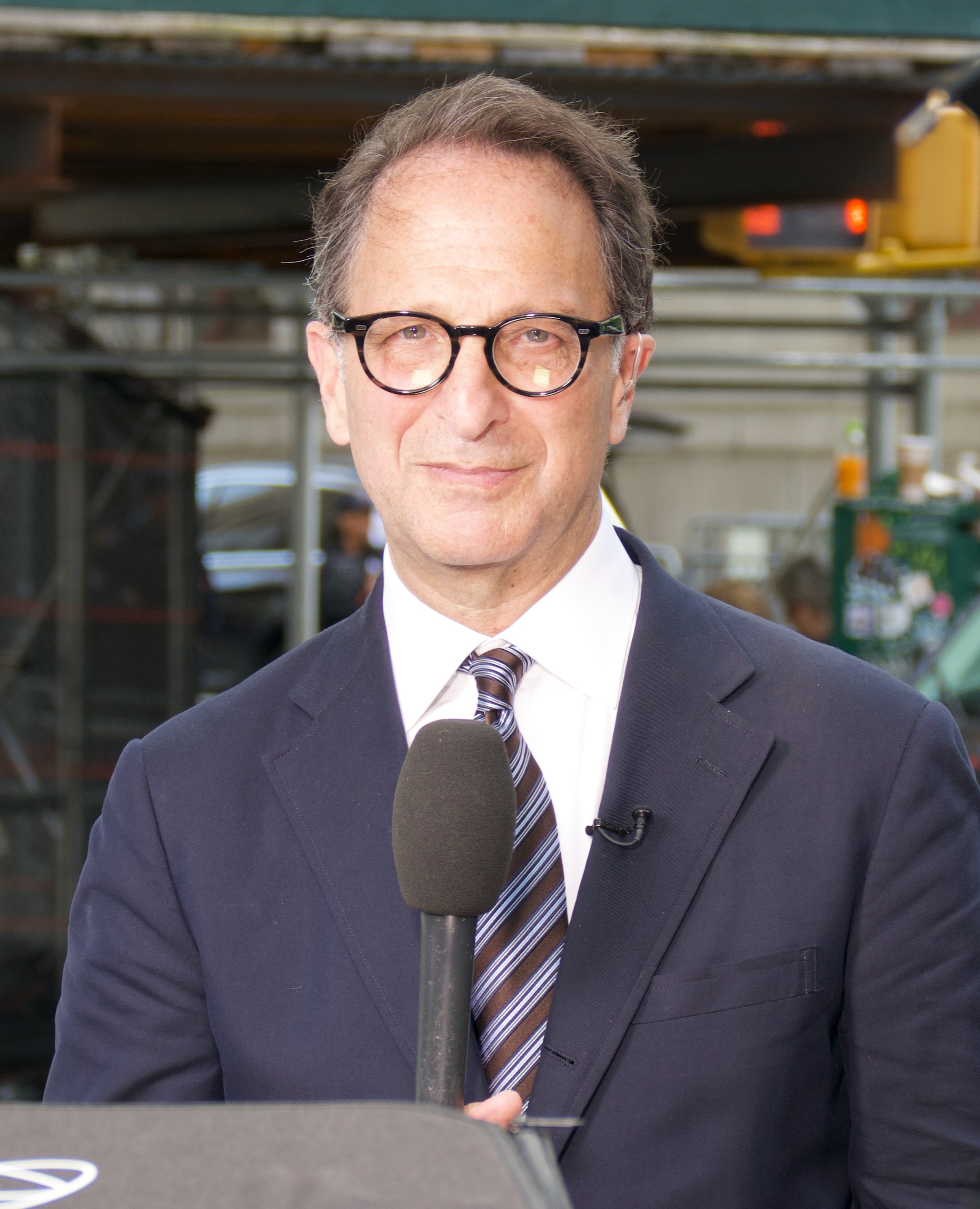
- Weissmann in 2024

General Counsel of the Federal Bureau of Investigation
- In office 2011–2013
- President: Barack Obama
- Director: Robert Mueller
- Preceded by: Valerie E. Caproni
- Succeeded by: James A. Baker

Personal details
- Born: March 17, 1958 (age 68) New York City, New York, U.S.
- Education: Princeton University (BA); University of Geneva; Columbia University (JD)
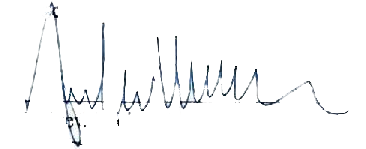
- Signature

Andrew A. Weissmann (born March 17, 1958) is an American attorney and professor. He was an Assistant United States Attorney from 1991 to 2002, when he prosecuted high-profile organized crime cases. He served as chief of the Fraud Section in the Department of Justice (2015–2017) and as a lead prosecutor in Robert S. Mueller's Special Counsel's Office (2017–2019). He was in private practice at Jenner & Block in New York during two separate periods away from public service. He has taught at New York University School of Law, Fordham Law School, and Brooklyn Law School. He is currently a professor at the New York University School of Law.

In 2002, President George W. Bush appointed Weissmann as deputy director and then director of the Federal Bureau of Investigation's Enron Task Force. Weissman also served as General Counsel of the Federal Bureau of Investigation from 2011 to 2013, under President Barack Obama.

Starting in 2015, Weissman became chief of the Criminal Fraud Section of the U.S. Department of Justice. In June 2017, he was appointed to a management role on the 2017 special counsel team headed by Robert Mueller. To assume that position, Weissmann took a leave from his Department of Justice post. The special counsel's investigation concluded in 2019. At that time, Weissmann returned to his practice in the private sector.

== Early life and education ==
Weissmann, who is of Jewish heritage, was born in New York City, son of Gerald Weissmann and Ann Weissmann (née Raphael) in 1958, and grew up there, attending the Ethical Culture Fieldston School. He subsequently attended Princeton University, where he received a bachelor's degree in 1980. After a Fulbright scholarship to the University of Geneva, he received a Juris Doctor from Columbia Law School (1984). He then clerked for Judge Eugene Nickerson in the United States District Court for the Eastern District of New York.

== Career ==
=== US Attorney (1991-2002) ===
In 1991, Weissmann was an assistant U.S. attorney in the U.S. Attorney's Office for the Eastern District of New York, and he remained in that role until 2002. While at EDNY, Weissmann tried more than 25 cases, some of which involved members of the Genovese, Colombo, and Gambino crime families. He led the prosecution team in the Vincent Gigante case, in which Gigante was convicted.

=== In Bush 43 Administration (2002-2005) ===
From 2002 to 2005, Weissmann was deputy director, appointed by George W. Bush.

Weissmann's work during his assignment as director of the task force investigating the Enron scandal resulted in the prosecution of more than 30 people for such crimes as perjury, fraud, and obstruction, including three of Enron's top executives: Andrew Fastow, Kenneth Lay, and Jeffrey Skilling. In a follow-up case in U.S. District Court, Weissmann also was successful, controversially, at arguing that auditing firm Arthur Andersen LLP had covered up for Enron. Weissmann was characterized as a "pitbull" by The New York Times during the Enron prosecution, and some said he deployed "hard-nosed tactics and a 'win-at-all-costs' mentality". He had argued for the district judge to instruct the jury that the jury could convict the firm regardless of whether the firm's employees knew they were violating the law, a court ruling that later was overturned by the Supreme Court. In Arthur Andersen LLP v. United States the court held that "the jury instructions failed to convey the requisite consciousness of wrongdoing". Nonetheless, the case had already resulted in destruction of the firm.

After the special counsel completed its mandate in 2005, Weissmann was special counsel again with Robert Mueller.

=== Private practice (2005-2011) ===
For a time, Weissmann went into private practice at Jenner & Block in New York.

=== In Obama administration (2011-2016) ===
In 2011, he returned to the FBI, serving as general counsel under Mueller. From 2015 to 2017, he headed the criminal fraud section of the U.S. Department of Justice.

=== In Trump I administration (2017-2019) ===
On June 19, 2017, Weissmann joined Special Counsel Mueller's team to investigate Russian interference in the 2016 United States elections. He was called "the architect of the case against former Trump campaign chairman Paul Manafort". A news report in March 2019 said he would soon leave the Justice Department, become a faculty member at New York University, and work on public service projects. In 2020, Weissmann returned to Jenner & Block as co-chair of its investigations, compliance, and defense practice.

On March 25, 2025, Trump issued executive order 14246 against Jenner & Block that suspended the security clearance of lawyers and "restricted their access to government buildings, officials and federal contracting work". The order also mentioned the firm's employment of Weissmann. The firm has also been involved in challenging a number of policies by the Trump administration since the start of Trump's second term.

=== Media and publishing career (2019-present) ===
In 2019, Weissmann joined MSNBC as a legal analyst. Beginning in March 2023, he co-hosted the MSNBC podcast Prosecuting Donald Trump (with fellow former prosecutor Mary McCord), which won the 'Webby Winner' and 'People's Voice Winner' in the Crime & Justice category of the 2024 Webby Awards.

Since the second election of Trump, Weissmann and McCord have co-hosted a podcast entitled Main Justice. Their May 10, 2025, podcast also was published on the Weissmann May 10, 2025, episode of his Substack newsletter that is entitled Behind the Headlines.

His book Where Law Ends: Inside the Mueller Investigation was published in September 2020.

In May 2026, Weissmann published Liar's Kingdom: How to Stop Trump’s Deceit and Save America (Little, Brown & Company)

== Personal life ==
Andrew Weissmann is the brother of Lisa Beth Weissmann, MD, of Mount Auburn Hospital in Cambridge, Massachusetts.
