= Michael Dreeben =

American attorney (born 1954)

Personal details
- Born: c. 1954 (age 71–72)
- Education: University of Wisconsin, Madison (BA); University of Chicago (MA); Duke University (JD)

Michael R. Dreeben (born c. 1954) is a former Deputy Solicitor General who was in charge of the U.S. Department of Justice criminal docket before the United States Supreme Court. He is recognized as an expert in U.S. criminal law.

Dreeben recently served as Counselor to Special Counsel Jack Smith. Dreeben is currently a lecturer at Harvard Law School and the Hebrew University Faculty of Law.

Dreeben had a lengthy career in the Solicitor General's office, starting as an Assistant in 1988, then promoted as a Deputy Solicitor General in 1995, serving until 2019. In his first case before the Supreme Court, United States v. Halper (1989), he was opposed by John Roberts, who later became Chief Justice. In 2016 Dreeben became only the seventh person to argue 100 cases before the Supreme Court. In 2017, he was enlisted by special counsel Robert Mueller to assist the investigation of Russia's interventions into the 2016 U.S. presidential election. By December 2023 he had joined the Smith special counsel investigation of former president Donald Trump, as the special counsel petitioned the U.S. Supreme Court to swiftly decide whether Trump has immunity from criminal prosecution.

Dreeben is a Distinguished Lecturer at Georgetown Law, and has previously taught at Harvard Law School and Duke University Law School. In 2020 he became a partner at O'Melveny & Myers.

In 2025, Dreeben began serving as part of the defense counsel team for James Comey after his indictment by a federal grand jury in Virginia on two charges that are related to his Congressional testimony in September 2020.

== Selected publications ==
- ——— (1981). "Hot-Cargo Agreements in the Construction Industry: Restraints on Subcontracting under the Proviso to Section 8(e)". Duke Law Journal. 1981 (1): 141–180. doi:10.2307/1372307. JSTOR 1372307.
- ——— (1988). "Insider Trading and Intangible Rights: The Redefinition of the Mail Fraud Statute". Am. Crim. L. Rev. 26 (1): 181–227.
