= List of nicknames used by George W. Bush =

Former U.S. president George W. Bush is widely known to use nicknames to refer to journalists, fellow politicians, and members of his White House staff.

== Family ==
Nickname	Personal name	Notes
Poppy	George H. W. Bush	41st President of the United States, George W. Bush's father
Bushie	Laura Bush	Former First Lady of the United States, George W. Bush's wife. Nickname is mutual.

== Foreign leaders ==
Nickname	Personal name	Office
Dino	Jean Chrétien	20th Prime Minister of Canada
Pootie-Poot	Vladimir Putin	President and former Prime Minister of Russia
Ostrich Legs	Vladimir Putin	President and former Prime Minister of Russia
Bandar Bush	Bandar bin Sultan	Former ambassador to the United States from Saudi Arabia
Landslide	Tony Blair	Former Prime Minister of the United Kingdom
Man of Steel	John Howard and Kevin Rudd	Former Prime Ministers of Australia
Juni	Junichiro Koizumi	56th Prime Minister of Japan
Saak	Mikheil Saakashvili	3rd President of Georgia

== Staff ==
Nickname	Personal name	Notes
Big Time	Dick Cheney	46th Vice President of the United States of America
Vice	Dick Cheney	46th Vice President of the United States of America
Rummy	Donald Rumsfeld	21st Secretary of Defense
Izzy	Israel Hernandez	Special Assistant. The latter nickname was given for his role as provider of breath mints to the President on the campaign trail.
Altoid Boy	Israel Hernandez	Special Assistant. The latter nickname was given for his role as provider of breath mints to the President on the campaign trail.
Boy Genius	Karl Rove	Senior Advisor to the President of the United States
Turd Blossom	Karl Rove	Senior Advisor to the President of the United States
The Architect	Karl Rove	Senior Advisor to the President of the United States
Condi	Condoleezza Rice	Secretary of State
Guru	Condoleezza Rice	Secretary of State
The World's Greatest Hero	Colin Powell	Secretary of State
Big O	Paul O'Neill	Secretary of the Treasury. "Big O" superseded the alternate term.
Pablo	Paul O'Neill	Secretary of the Treasury. "Big O" superseded the alternate term.
Fredo	Alberto Gonzales	Attorney General
Barty	Dan Bartlett	Deputy Chief of Staff
Bart	Dan Bartlett	Deputy Chief of Staff
Danny Boy	Dan Bartlett	Deputy Chief of Staff
Captain Dan	Dan Bartlett	Deputy Chief of Staff
Dan the Man	Dan Bartlett	Deputy Chief of Staff
Ari-Bob	Ari Fleischer	White House Press Secretary
High Prophet	Karen Hughes	Special Advisor, Director of Communications under Texas Governor George W. Bush
Hurricane Karen	Karen Hughes	Special Advisor, Director of Communications under Texas Governor George W. Bush
The Blade	Mitch Daniels	Office of Management and Budget Director
My Man Mitch	Mitch Daniels	Office of Management and Budget Director
Big Country	Joe Allbaugh	Federal Emergency Management Agency Director
Brownie	Michael D. Brown	Federal Emergency Management Agency Director
Brother George	George Tenet	CIA Director
Tree Man	Unnamed	Forest Service official
Tangent Man	Andrew Card	White House Chief of Staff
Tiny	Richard Armitage	Deputy Secretary of State
Light Bulb	Andrew D. Lundquist	National Energy Policy Development Group Executive Director
Bullets	Ann Veneman	Secretary of Agriculture
M&M	Mary Matalin	Assistant to Dick Cheney
Horny	Jonathan Horn	White House Speechwriter
Scrote	Ronny Jackson	Physician to the President

== Politicians ==
Nickname	Personal name	Notes
Bama	Barack Obama	44th President of the United States
Rock	Barack Obama	44th President of the United States
Boner	John Boehner	Republican Majority Leader, later Speaker of the House
No. 3	Nancy Pelosi	Speaker of the House
Big Boy	Chris Christie	United States Attorney for the District of New Jersey, later Governor of New Jersey
Jazzman	John Conyers	Michigan United States Congressman
Pablo	Paul Wellstone	Minnesota Senator
Pedro	Peter King	New York Congressman
Hogan	John McCain	Arizona Senator, Republican nominee in the 2008 United States presidential election
Big George	George Miller	California Congressman
Freddy Boy	Fred Upton	Michigan Congressman
Freddo	Fred Upton	Michigan Congressman
Congressman Kickass	John Sweeney	New York Congressman
Nellie	Ben Nelson	Nebraska Senator. "Nellie" was superseded by its alternative.
Benny	Ben Nelson	Nebraska Senator. "Nellie" was superseded by its alternative.
Benator	Ben Nelson	Nebraska Senator. "Nellie" was superseded by its alternative.
Ellis	Charles Ellis "Chuck" Schumer	New York Senator
Ali	Barbara Boxer	California Senator
Frazier	Dianne Feinstein	California Senator
Sabertooth	Barney Frank	Massachusetts Congressman
Red	Adam Putnam	Florida Congressman

== Journalists ==
Nickname	Personal name	Notes
The Cobra	Maureen Dowd	New York Times columnist
Stretch	David Gregory	Television journalist formerly with NBC, currently with CNN
Little Stretch	David Gregory	Television journalist formerly with NBC, currently with CNN
Stretch	Dick Kyle	Political correspondent with Bloomberg News
Super Stretch	Bill Sammon	Former White House correspondent for The Washington Times and The Washington Examiner, current Fox News editing manager
Mikey	Mike Emanuel	Fox News White House correspondent
Shades	Peter Wallsten	Political reporter with the Wall Street Journal. Bush mocked him for wearing sunglasses inside, not knowing Wallsten is partially blind.
Panchito	Frank Bruni	New York Times reporter who covered the Bush campaign in 2000

== Others ==
Nickname	Personal name	Notes
Kenny Boy	Kenneth Lay	Enron Corporation CEO
Weadie	Doug Wead	Author
Weadnik	Doug Wead	Author
The Englishman	Peter McMahon	Dana Perino's husband
Flies on the Eyeballs Guy	Cofer Black	Director of the CIA Counterterrorist Center
Rosey	Jack Rosen	Chief Executive of Rosen Partners LLC.

== See also ==
- List of nicknames used by Donald Trump
- List of nicknames of presidents of the United States
- Lists of nicknames – nickname list articles on Wikipedia
