= Joanna Hendon =

American attorney

- Education: University of British Columbia (BA); Yale University (JD)
- Occupation: Attorney
- Known for: John Marshall Award
- Political party: Republican (until 2015); Democratic (2016–present)
- Board member of: Alston & Bird
- Website: Official website

Joanna C. Hendon is an attorney with Alston & Bird in New York who specializes in white collar criminal defense, securities enforcement, and complex civil litigation.

== Early life ==
Hendon received her BA from the University of British Columbia in 1987 and her JD from Yale Law School in 1991.

== Career ==
Hendon is a former federal prosecutor in the Southern District of New York. In 2000, she received the United States Attorney General's John Marshall Award, the highest award given by the Department of Justice for excellence at trial.

In 2011, she received media coverage for her appeals to the jury to send her client, Winifred Jiau, who was accused of revealing insider information, "home to her dog". She was described as playing "the dog card".

From 2012 to 2014, she represented a former Dell Inc. employee accused of leaking confidential information to securities analysts, relating to the United States government's prosecution in United States v. Newman, et al., 773 F.3d 438 (2d Cir. Dec. 10, 2014), cert. denied, 136 S. Ct. 242 (2015).

She is a former adjunct professor of law at Fordham University School of Law.

In April 2018 she was retained to represent United States President Donald Trump.

She was scheduled to speak at a Yale colloquium honoring Marvin Chirelstein on April 19.

== See also ==
- Michael Cohen (lawyer)
