= Greg Andres =

American attorney

- Education: University of Notre Dame (BA); University of Chicago (JD)
- Spouse: Ronnie Abrams (m. 2001)

Greg Donald Andres is an American attorney, who most notably served as an Assistant Special Counsel for Russian interference in 2016 United States elections under Robert Mueller. He rejoined the law firm of Davis Polk & Wardwell in June 2019.

== Career ==
Andres previously served as a Deputy Assistant Attorney General for the Criminal Division of the Department of Justice from 2010 to 2012, an Assistant United States Attorney for the Eastern District of New York, where he rose to be Chief of the Criminal Division, and a partner at Davis Polk & Wardwell.

While at the Eastern District, Andres prosecuted numerous members of the Bonanno crime family, and was subject to assassination plots by family boss Vincent Basciano. In August 2006, after Basciano had been transferred to Metropolitan Correctional Center, New York in Manhattan, a fellow inmate passed on a hit-list of five individuals authored by Basciano to federal authorities, including Andres, Eastern District Judge Nicholas Garaufis, and three mafia informants.

While serving as Deputy Assistant Attorney General, Andres oversaw criminal fraud prosecutions and foreign bribery investigations under the Foreign Corrupt Practices Act. Among the prosecutions brought by Andres from this office is that of then billionaire and Antiguan knight Sir Allen Stanford, who was sentenced to 110 years in prison and forced to forfeit billions of dollars in assets in relation to his $8 billion Ponzi scheme.

Andres was the 16th attorney hired by the Special Counsel's office when appointed by Mueller in August 2017.

== Personal life ==
Andres is an alumnus of the University of Notre Dame, and the University of Chicago Law School. In 2001, Andres married Ronnie Abrams, now a Judge of the United States District Court for the Southern District of New York, while she was an Assistant United States Attorney specializing in violent gangs in the Southern District, and he specialized in organized crime and narcotics in the Eastern District. Their wedding was performed by Judge Loretta Preska of the Southern District.

On July 11, 2017, just prior to the announcement of Andres's appointment in the Special Counsel's office, Abrams recused herself from the prior assigned cases CREW v. Trump and a companion Emoluments Clause lawsuit against Donald Trump; the cases were reassigned to George B. Daniels.
