= Andrew D. Goldstein =

American prosecutor

Andrew Goldstein
- Born: 1974 or 1975 (age 51–52)
- Education: Princeton University (BA); Yale University (JD)
- Parent: Jonathan L. Goldstein

Andrew D. Goldstein (born 1974 or 1975) is a prosecutor and the former chief of the public corruption unit of the United States Attorney's Office for the Southern District of New York. He was a member of the Special Counsel team, led by Special Counsel Robert Mueller, which investigated Russian interference in the 2016 United States elections.

== Early life and education ==
Goldstein is the son of Jonathan L. Goldstein, a Republican-appointed United States attorney in New Jersey. He graduated from The Pingry School in 1992 and Princeton University in 1996. He then graduated from Yale Law School. He is of Jewish descent. After school, Goldstein worked as a reporter for Time magazine covering national education policy and medicine.

== Career ==
Goldstein joined the United States Attorney's Office for the Southern District of New York in 2010 and served under U.S. Attorney Preet Bharara. He worked in the office's money laundering and asset forfeiture unit. In 2013, Goldstein successfully prosecuted three men in connection with the corruption scandal involving the payroll modernization project known as CityTime. He was a prosecutor in the successful prosecutions of former state Assembly Speaker Sheldon Silver and former state Senate Majority Leader Dean Skelos for corruption. He was also involved in the investigation of New York City Mayor Bill de Blasio's fundraising.
