= James L. Quarles =

American attorney (born 1946)

James Quarles
- Born: October 12, 1946
- Education: Denison University (BS); Harvard University (JD)

James L. Quarles III is an American attorney who was an assistant special prosecutor in the Watergate Special Prosecution's Office, and served as an Assistant Special Counsel for Russian interference in 2016 United States elections under Robert S. Mueller III.

== Career ==
Quarles earned a B.S., cum laude, from Denison University in 1968. He went on to attain his Juris Doctor, cum laude, from Harvard Law School in 1972. Upon graduation, Quarles undertook a clerkship with Judge Frank A. Kaufman of the United States District Court for the District of Maryland, and was appointed an assistant special prosecutor on the Watergate Special Prosecution Force, where he specialized in campaign finance issues. After leaving the Watergate special prosecutor's office, Quarles joined Wilmer Cutler Pickering Hale and Dorr, where he rose to be a senior litigation partner, handling major appellate cases nationwide. Quarles is admitted to practice in the District of Columbia, State of Maryland, and the Commonwealths of Massachusetts and Virginia.

Quarles joined the office of Special Counsel Robert Mueller, a former colleague at Wilmer Hale, in May 2017. Quarles's appointment was praised by his former Watergate colleague, Richard Ben-Veniste, who stated that there is "nothing comparable to the kind of pressure and obligation that this kind of job puts on your shoulders" and that Quarles's experience "gives him the confidence to know how to do it and how to do it right".

== See also ==
- Timeline of investigations into Trump and Russia (2019)
