= Plame affair criminal investigation =

Investigation of a spy leak

The Plame affair was a dispute stemming from allegations that one or more White House officials revealed Central Intelligence Agency (CIA) agent Valerie Plame Wilson's undercover status. An investigation, led by special counsel Patrick Fitzgerald, was started, concerning the possibility that one or more crimes may have been committed. The initial focus was on Scooter Libby; however, he was not the primary source of the leak.

On August 29, 2006, Neil A. Lewis of The New York Times reported that Richard Armitage was the first and primary source of the CIA leak investigation.

On September 6, 2006, The New York Times noted that early in his investigation, Fitzgerald knew Armitage was the primary source of the leak. The Times raised questions as to why the investigation proceeded as long as it did.

Fitzgerald issued no statement about Armitage's involvement, and as of September 2006, the CIA leak investigation remained open.

On August 30, 2006, CNN reported that Armitage had been confirmed "by sources" as leaking Valerie Plame's role as a CIA operative in a "casual conversation" with Robert Novak.

== CIA calls for leak investigation ==
On September 26, 2003, the CIA requested that the Justice Department investigate what is now known as the Plame affair. Then-Attorney General of the United States John Ashcroft initially headed up the investigation. On 13 August 2005 journalist Murray Waas reported that the Justice Department and Federal Bureau of Investigation (FBI) officials had recommended appointing a special prosecutor to the case because they felt that Karl Rove had not been truthful in early interviews, withholding information from FBI investigators about his conversation with Matt Cooper of Time magazine about Plame and maintaining that he had first learned of Plame's CIA identity from a journalist whose name Rove could not recall. In addition, then-Attorney General John Ashcroft, from whose prior campaigns Rove had been paid $746,000 in consulting fees, had been briefed on the contents of at least one of Rove's interviews with the FBI, raising concerns of a conflict of interest. A 2 October 2003 New York Times article similarly connected Rove to the matter and highlighted his prior employment in three previous political campaigns for Ashcroft. Ashcroft subsequently recused himself from the investigation.

U.S. Attorney for the Northern District of Illinois Patrick Fitzgerald was appointed Special Counsel on 30 December 2003 (Comey names Fitzgerald). Fitzgerald began investigations into the leak working from White House telephone records turned over to the FBI in October 2003. In March 2004, the Special Counsel subpoenaed the telephone records of Air Force One.

== Grand jury ==
Known grand jury witnesses
- Claire Buchan – Deputy Press Secretary
- Matt Cooper – Time journalist
- Ari Fleischer – former Press Secretary
- Carl Ford – former director of Bureau of Intelligence and Research
- Alberto Gonzales – Attorney General, then serving as White House Counsel
- Bill Harlow – former CIA spokesman
- Israel Hernandez – former advisor to Karl Rove, Department of Commerce official
- Karen Hughes – former special advisor to the president
- Adam Levine – former White House communications aide
- Irving Lewis "Scooter" Libby, Jr. – Chief of Staff to the Vice President of the United States
- Scott McClellan – White House Press Secretary
- Mary Matalin – former advisor to the Vice President
- John E. McLaughlin – Deputy Director of the CIA
- Judith Miller – New York Times journalist
- Walter Pincus – Washington Post journalist
- Colin Powell – former Secretary of State
- Susan Ralston – secretary to Karl Rove
- Karl Rove – Assistant to the President (Bush first term) and Senior Advisor to the President (Bush second term)
- Tim Russert – NBC News senior correspondent, host of Meet the Press
- George Tenet – former Director of the CIA
- Bob Woodward – Washington Post journalist

A grand jury was empaneled and began taking testimony. A complete list of witnesses to testify there is not known, in part because Fitzgerald has conducted his investigation with much more discretion than previous presidential investigations. Some individuals have acknowledged giving testimony, including White House Press Secretary Scott McClellan, Deputy Press Secretary Claire Buchan, former press secretary Ari Fleischer, former special advisor to the president Karen Hughes, former White House communications aide Adam Levine, former advisor to the Vice President Mary Matalin, and former Secretary of State Colin Powell. On 13 May 2005, citing "close followers of the case, The Washington Post reported that the length of the investigation, and the particular importance paid to the testimony of reporters, suggested that the counsel's role had expanded to include investigation of perjury charges against witnesses. Other observers have suggested that the testimony of journalists was needed to show a pattern of intent by the leaker or leakers.

Fitzgerald interviewed both Vice President Dick Cheney and President George W. Bush but not separately and not under oath.

Legal filings by Special Counsel Patrick Fitzgerald contain many pages blanked out for security reasons, leading some observers to speculate that Fitzgerald has pursued the extent to which national security was compromised by Plame's identity being revealed.

On November 18, 2005, the Special Counsel stated that he would enlist a new grand jury when the old one expires. The use of a new grand jury could indicate that additional evidence or charges are coming. But experienced federal prosecutors cautioned against reading too much into Fitzgerald's disclosure:

"One of the greatest powers of the grand jury is the ability to subpoena witnesses ... and Fitzgerald may want that authority to pursue additional questions," French said. He might also need subpoenas to obtain documents, telephone records and executive branch agency security logs.

== Journalists and contempt of court ==
Several journalists have testified on this matter.

=== Robert Novak ===
Columnist Robert Novak, who later admitted that the CIA attempted to dissuade him from revealing Plame's name in print, "appears to have made some kind of arrangement with the special prosecutor" according to Newsweek, and he was not charged with contempt of court. Robert Novak died in 2009.

=== Matt Cooper ===
On 2 July 2005, Karl Rove's lawyer, Robert Luskin, said that his client spoke to Time reporter Matt Cooper "three or four days" before Plame's identity was first revealed in print by commentator Robert Novak.

Cooper's article in Time, citing unnamed and anonymous "government officials," confirmed Plame to be a "CIA official who monitors the proliferation of weapons of mass destruction." Cooper's article appeared three days after Novak's column was published.

Rove's lawyer, however, asserted that Rove "never knowingly disclosed classified information" and that "he did not tell any reporter that Valerie Plame worked for the CIA." This second statement has since been called into question by an e-mail, written three days before Novak's column, in which Cooper indicated that Rove had told him Wilson's wife worked at the CIA. If Rove were aware that this was classified information at the time, then both disclaimers by his lawyer would be untrue. Furthermore, Luskin said that Rove himself had testified before the grand jury "two or three times" (three times, according to the Los Angeles Times of 3 July 2005) and signed a waiver authorizing reporters to testify about their conversations with him and that Rove "has answered every question that has been put to him about his conversations with Cooper and anybody else." Rove's lawyer declined to share with Newsweek reporter Michael Isikoff the nature or contents of his client's conversations with Cooper.

On 6 July 2005, Cooper agreed to testify, to avoid being held in contempt of court and sent to jail. Cooper said "I went to bed ready to accept the sanctions for not testifying," but told the judge that not long before his early afternoon appearance at court he had received "in somewhat dramatic fashion" an indication from his source freeing him from his commitment to keep his source's identity secret. For some observers this called into question the allegations against Rove, who had signed a waiver months before permitting reporters to testify about their conversations with him (see above paragraph).

Cooper, however, stated in court that he did not previously accept a general waiver to journalists signed by his source whom he did not identify by name, because he had made a personal pledge of confidentiality to his source. The 'dramatic change' which allowed Cooper to testify was later revealed to be a phone conversation between lawyers for Cooper and his source confirming that the waiver signed two years earlier applied to conversations with Cooper. Citing a "person who has been officially briefed on the case," The New York Times identified Rove as the individual in question, a fact later confirmed by Rove's own lawyer. According to one of Cooper's lawyers, Cooper has previously testified before the grand jury regarding conversations with Lewis "Scooter" Libby, Jr., chief of staff for Vice President Dick Cheney, after having received Libby's specific permission to testify.

Cooper testified before a grand jury on 13 July 2005, confirming that Rove was the source who told him Wilson's wife was an employee of the CIA. In the 17 July 2005 TIME magazine article detailing his grand jury testimony, Cooper wrote that Rove never used Plame's name nor indicated that she had covert status, although Rove did apparently convey that certain information relating to her was classified: "As for Wilson's wife, I told the grand jury I was certain that Rove never used her name and that, indeed, I did not learn her name until the following week, when I either saw it in Robert Novak's column or Googled her, I can't recall which, ... [but] was it through my conversation with Rove that I learned for the first time that Wilson's wife worked at the C.I.A. and may have been responsible for sending him? Yes. Did Rove say that she worked at the 'agency' on 'W.M.D.'? Yes. When he said things would be declassified soon, was that itself impermissible? I don't know. Is any of this a crime? Beats me." Cooper also explained to the grand jury that the "double super secret background" under which Rove spoke to him was not an official White House or TIME magazine source or security designation, but an allusion to the 1978 film Animal House, in which a college fraternity is placed under "double secret probation."

=== Judith Miller ===
New York Times investigative reporter Judith Miller, who met with Lewis Libby on July 8, 2003, two days after Wilson's editorial was published, never wrote or reported a story on the Plame affair, but nevertheless refused (with Cooper) to answer questions before a grand jury in 2004 pertaining to confidential sources. Both reporters were held in contempt of court. On 27 June 2005, after the U.S. Supreme Court refused to grant certiorari, TIME magazine said it would surrender to Fitzgerald e-mail records and notes taken by Cooper, and Cooper agreed to testify before the grand jury after receiving a waiver from his source. Miller and Cooper faced potential jail terms for failure to cooperate with the Special Counsel's investigations.

New York Times reporter Judith Miller served a civil contempt jail sentence from early July 2005 to 29 September 2005, for refusing to testify to the grand jury.

Miller was jailed on 7 July 2005, in the same Alexandria, Virginia facility as Zacarias Moussaoui. She was released on September 29 upon reaching an agreement with Fitzgerald to testify at a hearing scheduled on the morning of September 30, 2005. Miller indicated that her source, unlike Cooper's, had not sufficiently waived confidentiality. She issued a statement at a press conference after her release, stating that her source, Lewis Libby, Vice President Dick Cheney's Chief of Staff, had released her from her promise of confidentiality, saying her source "voluntarily and personally released [her] from [her] promise of confidentiality."

In August 2005 the American Prospect magazine reported that Lewis Libby testified he had discussed Plame with Miller during a July 8, 2003, meeting. Libby signed a general waiver allowing journalists to reveal their discussions with him on this matter, but American Prospect reported that Miller refused to honor this waiver on the grounds that she considered it coerced. Miller had said she would accept a specific individual waiver to testify, but contends Libby had not given her one until late September 2005. In contrast, Libby's lawyer has insisted that he had fully released Miller to testify all along.

On October 16, 2005, Judith Miller published an account of her grand jury testimony for The New York Times. In the article, titled "My Four Hours Testifying in the Federal Grand Jury Room", Miller writes:

My notes indicate that well before Mr. Wilson published his critique, Mr. Libby told me that Mr. Wilson's wife may have worked on unconventional weapons at the C.I.A. My notes do not show that Mr. Libby identified Mr. Wilson's wife by name. Nor do they show that he described Valerie Wilson as a covert agent or "operative," as the conservative columnist Robert D. Novak first described her in a syndicated column published on July 14, 2003. (Mr. Novak used her maiden name, Valerie Plame.) ... My interview notes show that Mr. Libby sought from the beginning, before Mr. Wilson's name became public, to insulate his boss from Mr. Wilson's charges. According to my notes, he told me at our June meeting that Mr. Cheney did not know of Mr. Wilson, much less know that Mr. Wilson had traveled to Niger, in West Africa, to verify reports that Iraq was seeking to acquire uranium for a weapons program ... Although I was interested primarily in my area of expertise — chemical and biological weapons — my notes show that Mr. Libby consistently steered our conversation back to the administration's nuclear claims. His main theme echoed that of other senior officials: that contrary to Mr. Wilson's criticism, the administration had had ample reason to be concerned about Iraq's nuclear capabilities based on the regime's history of weapons development, its use of unconventional weapons and fresh intelligence reports. At that breakfast meeting, our conversation also turned to Mr. Wilson's wife. My notes contain a phrase inside parentheses: "Wife works at Winpac." Mr. Fitzgerald asked what that meant. Winpac stood for Weapons Intelligence, Non-Proliferation, and Arms Control, the name of a unit within the C.I.A. that, among other things, analyzes the spread of unconventional weapons. I said I couldn't be certain whether I had known Ms. Plame's identity before this meeting, and I had no clear memory of the context of our conversation that resulted in this notation. But I told the grand jury that I believed that this was the first time I had heard that Mr. Wilson's wife worked for Winpac. In fact, I told the grand jury that when Mr. Libby indicated that Ms. Plame worked for Winpac, I assumed that she worked as an analyst, not as an undercover operative ... Mr. Fitzgerald asked me about another entry in my notebook, where I had written the words "Valerie Flame," clearly a reference to Ms. Plame. Mr. Fitzgerald wanted to know whether the entry was based on my conversations with Mr. Libby. I said I didn't think so. I said I believed the information came from another source, whom I could not recall.

== Libby indictment ==
On October 28, 2005, the grand jury issued a five-count indictment against Lewis Libby, Vice President Dick Cheney's Chief of Staff, on felony charges of perjury, obstruction of justice, and making false statements to the FBI and the grand jury investigating the matter. When the indictment was announced, Libby resigned his post as Chief of Staff to the Vice President.

The indictment alleges that Libby had informed several reporters about Ms. Wilson's employment at the CIA, that this information was classified, and that Cheney got the information from CIA sources and brought it to Libby's attention. Libby has been accused of perjury and obstruction of justice for lying about the disclosure to investigators, but has not been criminally charged for releasing Plame's identity.

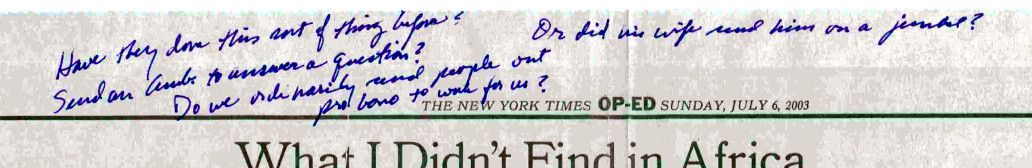
A handwritten note above Joe Wilson's editorial by Vice President Dick Cheney. Cheney wrote: "Have they done this sort of thing before?" "Send an amb(assador) to answer a question?" "Do we ordinarily send people out pro bono to work for us? "Or did his wife send him on a junket?".

In a court filing on May 12, 2006, Fitzgerald included a copy of Wilson's op-ed article in The New York Times "bearing handwritten notations by the vice president." (see photo)

Fitzgerald's filing declares that Libby ascertained Plame's name from Cheney through conferences by the vice president's office about "how to respond to a June 2003 inquiry from Washington Post reporter Walter Pincus about Wilson's trip to Niger". In the filing, Fitzgerald states:

It was during a conversation concerning Mr. Pincus' inquiries that the Vice President advised the defendant that Mr. Wilson's wife worked at the CIA. (To be clear, the government does not contend that the defendant disclosed the employment of Ms. Plame to Mr. Pincus, and Mr. Pincus's article contains no reference to her or her employment.) The article by Mr. Pincus thus explains the context in which the defendant discussed Mr. Wilson's wife's employment with the Vice President. The article also served to increase media attention concerning the then-unnamed ambassador's trip and further motivated the defendant to counter Mr. Wilson's assertions, making it more likely that the defendant's disclosures to the press concerning Mr. Wilson's wife were not casual disclosures that he had forgotten by the time he was asked about them by the Federal Bureau of Investigation and before the grand jury.

Fitzgerald sought to compel Matt Cooper, a TIME magazine correspondent who had covered the story, to disclose his sources to a grand jury. After losing all legal appeals up through the Supreme Court, TIME turned over Cooper's notes to the prosecutor. Cooper agreed to testify after receiving permission from his source, Karl Rove, to do so. Robert Luskin confirmed Rove was Cooper's source. A July 11, 2003, e-mail from Cooper to his bureau chief indicated that Rove had told Cooper that it was Wilson's wife who authorized her husband's trip to Niger, mentioning that she "apparently" worked at "the agency" on weapons of mass destruction issues. Newsweek reported that nothing in the Cooper email suggested that Rove used Plame's name or knew she was a covert operative, although Cooper's TIME magazine article describing his grand jury testimony noted that Rove said, "I've already said too much." Neither Newsweek nor TIME have released the complete Cooper email.

The leak to Newsweek, presumably from Time magazine, was the first major leak of investigative information. More attenuated leaks have followed, seemingly tailored to either include or absolve various officials and media personages. White House officials such as Press Secretary Scott McClellan and the president have not made any on-the-record comments concerning the investigation since Newsweek's e-mail scoop, although other Republican officials, particularly RNC chairman Ken Mehlman, are talking with the press.

== Further action ==
On October 6, 2005, Fitzgerald recalled Karl Rove, for the fourth time, to take the stand before the grand jury investigating the leak of Plame's identity. Fitzgerald had indicated that the only remaining witnesses to call were Cooper and Miller before he would close his case. On November 18, 2005, Fitzgerald submitted new court papers indicating that he would use a new grand jury to assist him in his ongoing investigation. The grand jury's term expired on October 28.

On April 26, 2006, Rove testified for a fifth time. It was his first appearance before the newly impanelled grand jury.

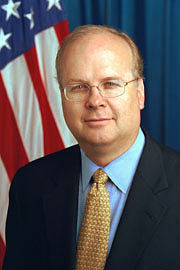
Karl Rove

Rove's attorney Robert D. Luskin told reporters that he has since received a fax from Fitzgerald indicating that, in the words of Mike Allen of TIME magazine, "absent any unexpected developments, he does not anticipate seeking any criminal charges against Rove." John Solomon of Associated Press reported that the news came by telephone rather than fax. And The New York Times reported that the news was announced by Fitzgerald "in a letter to Mr. Luskin." Luskin's own public statement indicates only that he was "formally advised" of this news by Fitzgerald, and Luskin's office has so far refused to comment further on that statement.

On June 13, 2006, Robert Luskin released the following statement:

On June 12, 2006, Special Counsel Patrick Fitzgerald formally advised us that he does not anticipate seeking charges against Karl Rove. In deference to the pending case, we will not make any further public statements about the subject matter of the investigation. We believe that the Special Counsel's decision should put an end to the baseless speculation about Mr. Rove's conduct.

On June 14, 2006, Joe Wilson responded to Luskin's statement by stating that "this is a marathon ... it's not over." He referred other questions to a statement released by his lawyer, Christopher Wolf. In the statement, Wolf stated that "while it appears that Mr. Rove will not be called to answer in criminal court for his participation in the wrongful disclosure of Valerie Wilson's classified employment status at the CIA, that obviously does not end the matter. The day still may come when Mr. Rove and others are called to account in a court of law for their attacks on the Wilsons."

Following the revelations in the Libby indictment, sixteen former CIA and military intelligence officials urged President Bush to suspend Karl Rove's security clearance for his part in outing CIA officer Valerie Plame.

== Court proceedings ==
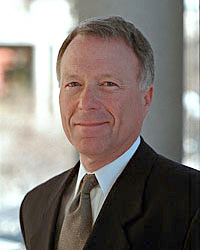
Lewis "Scooter" Libby

On November 3, 2005, I. Lewis "Scooter" Libby entered a not guilty plea in front of U.S. District Judge Reggie Walton, a former prosecutor who spent two decades as a judge in the nation's capital.

Due to the huge amount of classified material that was requested by Libby's defense, it was speculated that Libby was using graymail as a defense tactic. He also added the graymail expert John D. Cline to his defense team.

In December 2005, Patrick Fitzgerald responded to a motion by Dow Jones & Company, Inc., to unseal all or part of the redacted portion of a United States Court of Appeals for the District of Columbia opinion issued on February 15, 2005. The opinion pertained to oral arguments held on December 8, 2004. The opinion of the court was released on February 3, 2006, to the public. It reads:

As to the leaks' harmfulness, although the record omits specifics about Plame's work, it appears to confirm, as alleged in the public record and reported in the press, that she worked for the CIA in some unusual capacity relating to counterproliferation. Addressing deficiencies of proof regarding the Intelligence Identities Protection Act, the special counsel refers to Plame as "a person whose identity the CIA was making specific efforts to conceal and who had carried out covert work overseas within the last 5 years" — representations I trust the special counsel would not make without support. (8/27/04 Aff. at 28 n.15.)

On January 31, 2006, letters exchanged between Libby's lawyers and Fitzgerald's office concerning matters of discovery were released to the public. Reportedly, Fitgerald states:

A formal assessment has not been done of the damage caused by the disclosure of Valerie Wilson's status as a CIA employee, and thus we possess no such document. In any event, we would not view an assessment of the damage caused by the disclosure as relevant to the issue of whether or not Mr. Libby intentionally lied when he made the statements and gave the grand jury testimony which the grand jury alleged was false.

On March 17, 2006, Patrick Fitzgerald filed the government's response to a motion by Scooter Libby's defense team to dismiss the indictments.

On April 5, 2006, Patrick Fitzgerald filed the government's response to a motion by Scooter Libby's defense team on issues of discovery. On April 12, 2006, Fitzgerald issued a correction to some of the information in the government's motion. In the memo, he writes:

Nor would such documents of the CIA, NSC and the State Department place in context the importance of the conversations in which defendant participated. Defendant's participation in a critical conversation with Judith Miller on July 8 (discussed further below) occurred only after the Vice President advised defendant that the President specifically had authorized defendant to disclose certain information in the NIE. Defendant testified that the circumstances of his conversation with reporter Miller — getting approval from the President through the Vice President to discuss material that would be classified but for that approval — were unique in his recollection. Defendant further testified that on July 12, 2003, he was specifically directed by the Vice President to speak to the press in place of Cathie Martin (then the communications person for the Vice President) regarding the NIE and Wilson. Defendant was instructed to provide what was for him an extremely rare "on the record" statement, and to provide "background" and "deep background" statements, and to provide information contained in a document defendant understood to be the cable authored by Mr. Wilson. During the conversations that followed on July 12, defendant discussed Ms. Wilson's employment with both Matthew Cooper (for the first time) and Judith Miller (for the third time). Even if someone else in some other agency thought that the controversy about Mr. Wilson and/or his wife was a trifle, that person's state of mind would be irrelevant to the importance and focus defendant placed on the matter and the importance he attached to the surrounding conversations he was directed to engage in by the Vice President.

On May 12, 2006, Fitzgerald filed the Government's response to the Court's inquiry regarding news articles the Government intends to offer as evidence at the trial:

The June 12, 2003, Washington Post article by Mr. Pincus (to whom both Mr. Wilson and the defendant spoke prior to publication of the article) is relevant because Mr. Pincus' questions to the OVP sparked discussion within the OVP, including conversations between the defendant and the Vice President regarding how Mr. Pincus' questions should be answered. It was during a conversation concerning Mr. Pincus' inquiries that the Vice President advised the defendant that Mr. Wilson's wife worked at the CIA. (To be clear, the government does not contend that the defendant disclosed the employment of Ms. Plame to Mr. Pincus, and Mr. Pincus's article contains no reference to her or her employment.) The article by Mr. Pincus thus explains the context in which the defendant discussed Mr. Wilson's wife's employment with the Vice President. The article also served to increase media attention concerning the then-unnamed ambassador's trip and further motivated the defendant to counter Mr. Wilson's assertions, making it more likely that the defendant's disclosures to the press concerning Mr. Wilson's wife were not casual disclosures that he had forgotten by the time he was asked about them by the Federal Bureau of Investigation and before the grand jury.

Transcripts of Libby's grand jury appearances were also released.

On May 16, 2006, a transcript of court proceedings before Judge Reggie B. Walton was released. Libby's lawyers sought communications between Matthew Cooper and Massimo Calabresi, authors of an article published by Time magazine on July 17, 2003, and titled, "A War on Wilson?" Libby's lawyers contend that Massimo called Joe Wilson after Cooper learned from Karl Rove that Wilson's wife worked at the CIA. Libby's lawyers also told the judge they have an email Cooper sent to his editor describing a July 12, 2003, conversation with Libby in which there is no mention of Plame or her CIA status. An email was sent to Cooper's editor on July 16, 2003, "four days after his conversation with Mr. Libby and 5 days after his conversation with Mr. Rove, about the article they are planning to write in which they are going to mention the wife. And the e-mail says — talks about him having an administration source for the information about Ms. Wilson." Libby's lawyers, thus, sought communications between Massimo and Cooper to determine if Cooper conveyed to Massimo that Libby was a source as well for the information on Wilson's wife:

AND I SUBMIT TO YOUR HONOR THERE IS — AS YOU CAN SEE, THE CREDIBILITY OF MR. COOPER WITH RESPECT TO HIS DESCRIPTION THAT MR. LIBBY CONFIRMED MR. PLAME'S EMPLOYMENT BY THE C.I.A. IS GOING TO BE VERY MUCH AT ISSUE IN THIS CASE. AND THAT IS WHAT CASES ARE ALL ABOUT. AND WE SHOULD BE ENTITLED TO ANYTHING THAT MR. COOPER HAS SAID OR THAT OTHERS HAVE SAID OR DONE, SUCH AS MR. MASSIMO TALKING TO MR. WILSON ON THE BASIS OF WHAT COOPER SAID. AND THAT KIND OF INFORMATION IS DIRECTLY RELEVANT TO THE CROSS-EXAMINATION, AND WE SUBMIT THAT IT SHOULD BE ENFORCED. AND CERTAINLY WE HAVE ESTABLISHED SPECIFICITY WITH RESPECT TO THAT. THE OTHER THING I WOULD SAY IS THIS IS THE FIRST I HAVE HEARD THAT TIME HAS A DOCUMENT THAT REFERS TO MS. PLAME. NOW, PERHAPS, THAT'S MR. COOPER'S COMMUNICATION WITH MR. MASSIMO, OR PERHAPS IT IS MR. MASSIMO'S NOTES WITH MR. WILSON. I DON'T KNOW, BUT CERTAINLY IF THERE IS A DOCUMENT THAT DOES REFER TO MS. PLAME PRIOR TO JULY 14, WE SUBMIT THAT THAT'S RELEVANT AND SHOULD BE PRODUCED AS WELL. THAT'S ALL I HAVE ON TIME AND COOPER, YOUR HONOR.

On May 26, 2006, Judge Walton ruled on the motion:

However, upon reviewing the documents presented to it, the Court discerns a slight alteration between the several drafts of the articles, which the defense could arguably use to impeach Cooper. This slight alteration between the drafts will permit the defendant to impeach Cooper, regardless of the substance of his trial testimony, because his trial testimony cannot be consistent with both versions. Thus, unlike Miller, whose documents appear internally consistent and thus will only be admissible if she testifies inconsistently with these documents, Cooper's documents will undoubtedly be admissible. Because of the inevitability that Cooper will be a government witness at trial, this Court can fathom no reason to delay the production of these documents to the defendant, as they will undoubtedly be admissible for impeachment.

For the reasons discussed above, this Court will grant reporter Judith Miller's motion to quash, and grant in part and deny in part the remaining motions. Therefore, at the appropriate times as designated in this opinion, those documents subject to production must be produced to the defendant so that they can be used as impeachment or contradiction evidence during the trial. In addition, based on the facts of this case, this Court declines to recognize a First Amendment reporters' privilege. And, the Court concludes that any common law reporters' privilege that may exist has been overcome by the defendant.

== Criticism ==
Because the Justice Department is a part of the executive branch, some critics of the Bush Administration contend that the absence of rapid and effective action was deliberate.

General Paul E. Vallely criticized Special Counsel Patrick Fitzgerald on FOX News for not contacting a number of people who publicly stated they knew of Plame's job at the CIA.

Many of us as private citizens really challenged the depth and the extensiveness of Special Prosecutor Fitzgerald because he never called in Joe Wilson or Valerie Plame, who was an analyst by the way, and that's documented, or any of the hierarchy of the CIA. And so to me that's an incomplete process and should probably be null and void.

General Vallely was criticized by some for allegedly lying about his part in the affair. Vallely has claimed that Joe Wilson informed him that his wife was a covert agent, but did not reveal this until more than two years after the fact, and a year and a half after the investigation had begun.

An editorial in The Washington Post read:

The special counsel was principally investigating whether any official violated a law that makes it a crime to knowingly disclose the identity of an undercover agent. The public record offers no indication that Mr. Libby or any other official deliberately exposed Ms. Plame to punish her husband, former ambassador Joseph C. Wilson IV. Rather, Mr. Libby and other officials, including Karl Rove, the White House deputy chief of staff, apparently were seeking to combat the sensational allegations of a critic. They may have believed that Ms. Plame's involvement was an important part of their story of why Mr. Wilson was sent to investigate claims that Iraq sought uranium ore from Niger, and why his subsequent — and mostly erroneous — allegations that the administration twisted that small part of the case against Saddam Hussein should not be credited. To criminalize such discussions between officials and reporters would run counter to the public interest. ... That said, the charges Mr. Fitzgerald brought against Mr. Libby are not technicalities. According to the indictment, Mr. Libby lied to both the FBI and a grand jury. No responsible prosecutor would overlook a pattern of deceit like that alleged by Mr. Fitzgerald. The prosecutor was asked to investigate a serious question, and such obstructions are, as he said yesterday, like throwing sand in the umpire's face. In this case, they seem to have contributed to Mr. Fitzgerald's distressing decision to force a number of journalists to testify about conversations with a confidential source. Both Mr. Libby and Mr. Rove appear to have allowed the White House spokesman to put out false information about their involvement.

John W. Dean, the former counsel to Richard Nixon, wrote in an open letter to Patrick Fitzgerald:

In your post as Special Counsel, you now have nothing less than authority of the Attorney General of the United States, for purposes of the investigation and prosecution of "the alleged unauthorized disclosure of a CIA employee's identity." (The employee, of course, is Valerie Plame Wilson, a CIA employee with classified status, and the wife of former Ambassador Joseph Wilson.) On December 30, 2003, you received a letter from the Deputy Attorney General regarding your powers. On February 6, 2004, you received a letter of further clarification, stating without reservation, that in this matter your powers are "plenary." In effect, then, you act with the power of the Attorney General of the United States.

In light of your broad powers, the limits and narrow focus of your investigation are surprising. On October 28 of this year, your office released a press statement in which you stated that "A major focus of the grand jury investigation was to determine which government officials had disclosed to the media prior to July 14, 2003, information concerning Valerie Wilson's CIA affiliation, and the nature, timing, extent, and purpose of such disclosures, as well as whether any official made such a disclosure knowing that Valerie Wilson's employment by the CIA was classified information."

Troubling, from an historical point of view, is the fact that the narrowness of your investigation, which apparently is focusing on the Intelligence Identities Protection Act (making it a crime to uncover the covert status of a CIA agent), plays right into the hands of perpetrators in the Administration.

Indeed, this is exactly the plan that was employed during Watergate by those who sought to conceal the Nixon Administration's crimes, and keep criminals in office.

The plan was to keep the investigation focused on the break-in at the Democratic National Committee headquarters - and away from the atmosphere in which such an action was undertaken. Toward this end, I was directed by superiors to get the Department of Justice to keep its focus on the break-in, and nothing else.

That was done. And had Congress not undertaken its own investigation (since it was a Democratically-controlled Congress with a Republican President) it is very likely that Watergate would have ended with the conviction of those caught in the bungled burglary and wiretapping attempt at the Democratic headquarters.

In an editorial in Investor's Business Daily, the Plame investigation was described as a politically motivated, "costly sham"

[I]t's hard to see anything but politics as the motivation for Fitzgerald's handling of the Plame affair. The facts indicate that Fitzgerald knew early on that the original leaker was State Department official Richard Armitage. So why did Fitzgerald let a cloud hang over White House adviser Karl Rove's head for so long? And why is Fitzgerald continuing to hound Libby, the former vice presidential chief of staff?

The answer seems to be that Armitage, who is charged with nothing and brags that he hasn't even consulted a lawyer, was former Secretary of State Colin Powell's right-hand man and a critic of pre-emptive war in Iraq. Libby, on the other hand, was an architect of that war strategy. Do doves get a pass in Fitzgerald's book, while hawks get an indictment?

...

"Armitage himself was aggressively investigated" by Fitzgerald. So Armitage fessed up at the outset. Fitzgerald long ago knew whom Armitage talked to and when. And he knew it was Armitage, not Libby, who was responsible for outing Plame (whose status as a secret CIA operative was dubious at best).

Fitzgerald's contention in October that Libby was "the first official known to have told a reporter ... about Valerie Wilson" may therefore have been a lie. Fitzgerald knew in the early days of his politicized witch hunt that no crime was committed.

No one intentionally revealed the identity of a truly covert agent. Yet he made a reporter, Miller, spend nearly 90 days in jail for refusing to reveal her source.

Meanwhile, Fitzgerald refused to reveal to the public the true source. From top to bottom, this has been one of the most disgraceful abuses of prosecutorial power in this country's history. That it's taking place at a time of war only magnifies its sordidness.

... The Plame case proves [Fitzgerald] can bend the truth with the proficiency of the slickest of pols.

== Other references ==
1. Letter from James B. Comey, Acting Attorney General, to Patrick J. Fitzgerald, United States Attorney Dec. 30, 2003. United States Department of Justice Office of Special Counsel
2. Errant former ambassador.Novak, Robert (July 15, 2004). Townhall.com
3. What I didn't find in Africa. New York Times Wilson, Joseph (July 6, 2003). reprinted at Common Dreams News Center
4. Libby Indictment
5. Libby Indictment
6. New Grand Jury in CIA Leak Case Hears From Prosecutor Washington Post Carol D. Leonnig December 8, 2005
7. Time Reporter Testifies in Leak CaseWashington Post Carol D. Leonnig and Jim VandeHei December 9, 2005
8. What Viveca Novak Told Fitzgerald TIME magazine Viveca Novak Dec. 19, 2005
9. Rove Testifies 5th Time on Leak Washington Post Jim Vandehei April 27, 2006

=== Additional resources ===
- Bush, George W. State of the Union Address. Online posting. Official website of The White House January 28, 2003.
- Corn, David. "Will Scooter Libby Graymail the CIA?" Capital Games (blog), The Nation February 6, 2006. Accessed January 14, 2007.
- The New York Times, comp. Key Documents. New York Times. n.d. Accessed January 14, 2007.
- Novak, Robert. Robert Novak's column in the Chicago Sun-Times. Accessed January 14, 2007.
- "Report on the U.S. Intelligence Community's Prewar Intelligence Assessments on Iraq" (PDF). Archived from the original (PDF) on August 16, 2006.. Online posting. Official website of the United States Senate Select Committee on Intelligence July 7, 2004. [Outdated link.] News archive link at iwar.org.uk: "iraqreport2.pdf" (PDF). Archived from the original (PDF) on December 24, 2006. (23.4 MB). (521 pages.)
- Jordan, Sandra. "The Devil in the Details: The CIA Leak Case." Jurist (University of Pittsburgh School of Law) October 31, 2005. Accessed January 14, 2007.
- Murray Waas, "Exclusive: Plame Game Over?" American Prospect, April 6, 2005. Accessed Sept. 15, 2007.
- Waas, Murray. "Online Exclusive: CIA Leak Probe: Inside The Grand Jury CIA Leak Case." National Journal January 12, 2007. Accessed January 14, 2007.
- Murray Waas, "Cheney Authorized Libby to Leak Classified Information" National Journal, Feb. 9 2006. Accessed Sept. 10, 2007.
- The Washington Post, comp. CIA Leak Investigation. Online posting. Washington Post September 9, 2005. Accessed January 14, 2007.
- Wilson, Joseph C. "Administration Went After Me and My Wife." The Miami Herald May 2, 2004. Online re-posting in Common Dreams NewsCenter. Accessed January 14, 2007.
- Carpenter, Amanda. Valerie Plame Distorts Her 'Covert' Status. 11th ed. Vol. 63. 2007. 1-22.
- Lemann, Nicholas. Telling Secrets. 35th ed. Vol. 81. 2005. 48-56.
- McClellan, Scott. What Happened: Inside the Bush White House and Washington's Culture of Deception. 4th ed. Vol. 46. Sage Publications, 2009. 603-604.
- Plame, Valerie. "Valerie Plame on Being a Spy." Interview by author. January 1, 2009.
- Scafuri, Jenna. Valerie Plame Wilson and Joseph Wilson "Speak Truth to Power" at General Session and Annual Lunchon. 2nd ed. Vol. 74. 2012. 62-64.

== See also ==
- Plame affair timeline
- Plame v. Cheney
