= Plame affair grand jury investigation =

American federal investigation, 2003–2007

The CIA leak grand jury investigation (related to the "CIA leak scandal", also known as the "Plame affair") was a federal inquiry "into the alleged unauthorized disclosure of a Central Intelligence Agency (CIA) employee's identity", a possible violation of criminal statutes, including the Intelligence Identities Protection Act of 1982 and Title 18, United States Code, Section 793.

== CIA leak scandal ("Plame affair") ==
The "CIA leak scandal", or the "Plame affair", refers to a dispute stemming from allegations that one or more White House officials revealed Valerie Plame Wilson's covert CIA identity as "Valerie Plame" to reporters.

In his July 14, 2003 Washington Post column, Robert Novak revealed the name of CIA employee Valerie Plame, wife of Joseph C. Wilson IV, who had covert status. Wilson, a former U.S. Ambassador, had criticized the Bush administration in a July 6, 2003, editorial in The New York Times. Wilson argued that the Bush administration misrepresented intelligence prior to the 2003 invasion of Iraq. In his column, Novak diminished Wilson's claims:

Wilson never worked for the CIA, but his wife, Valerie Plame, is an Agency operative on weapons of mass destruction. Two senior administration officials told me Wilson's wife suggested sending him to Niger to investigate ...

On October 1, 2003, Richard Armitage told both Secretary of State Colin Powell and the Federal Bureau of Investigation (FBI) that he "was the inadvertent leak".

== Appointment of Special Prosecutor Patrick Fitzgerald ==
On September 26, 2003, at the request of the CIA, the Department of Justice and the FBI began a criminal investigation into the possible unauthorized disclosure of classified information regarding Valerie Wilson's CIA affiliation to various reporters in the spring of 2003. Then-Attorney General John Ashcroft initially headed up the investigation. On August 13, 2005, journalist Murray Waas reported that Justice Department and FBI officials had recommended appointing a special prosecutor to the case because they felt that Karl Rove had not been truthful in early interviews, withholding from FBI investigators his conversation with Cooper about Plame and maintaining that he had first learned of Plame's CIA identity from a journalist whose name Rove could not recall. In addition, then-Attorney General John Ashcroft, from whose prior campaigns Rove had been paid $746,000 in consulting fees, had been briefed on the contents of at least one of Rove's interviews with the FBI, raising concerns of a conflict of interest. An October 2, 2003 New York Times article similarly connected Karl Rove to the matter and highlighted his prior employment in three previous political campaigns for Ashcroft. Ashcroft subsequently recused himself from the investigation, apparently at the end of December 2003.

U.S. Attorney for the Northern District of Illinois Patrick Fitzgerald was appointed Special Counsel on December 30, 2003.

Letter from James B. Comey, Acting Attorney General, to Patrick J. Fitzgerald, United States Attorney:

By the authority vested in the Attorney General by law, including 28 U.S.C. 509, 510, and 515, and in my capacity as Acting Attorney General pursuant to 28 U.S.C. 508, I hereby delegate to you all the authority of the Attorney General with respect to the department's investigation into the alleged unauthorized disclosure of a CIA employee's identity, and I direct you to exercise that authority as Special Counsel independent of the supervision or control of any officer of the department.

Fitzgerald began investigations into the leak working from White House telephone records turned over to the FBI in October 2003.

Fitzgerald learned of Armitage's role in the leak "shortly after his appointment in 2003".

== The investigation ==
=== The first grand jury ===
On October 31, 2003, a grand jury was sworn in and began taking testimony. A complete list of witnesses to testify there is not known, in part because Fitzgerald has conducted his investigation with much more discretion than previous presidential investigations.

Some individuals have acknowledged giving testimony, including White House Press Secretary Scott McClellan, Deputy Press Secretary Claire Buchan, former press secretary Ari Fleischer, former special advisor to the president Karen Hughes, former White House communications aide Adam Levine, former advisor to the Vice President Mary Matalin, and former Secretary of State Colin Powell.

Fitzgerald interviewed both Vice President Dick Cheney and President George W. Bush.

Legal filings by Special Counsel Patrick Fitzgerald contain many pages blanked out for security reasons, leading some observers to speculate that Fitzgerald has pursued the extent to which national security was compromised by Plame's identity being revealed.

In March 2004, the Special Counsel subpoenaed the telephone records of Air Force One.

=== Known grand jury witnesses ===
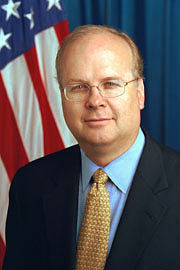
Karl Rove

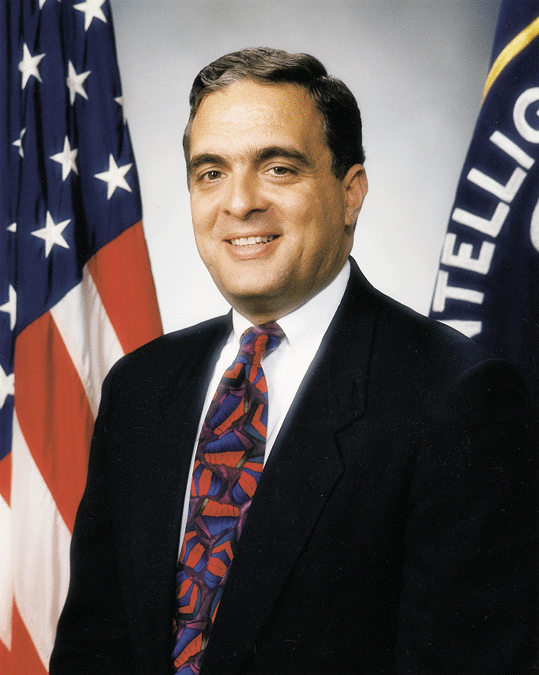
George Tenet

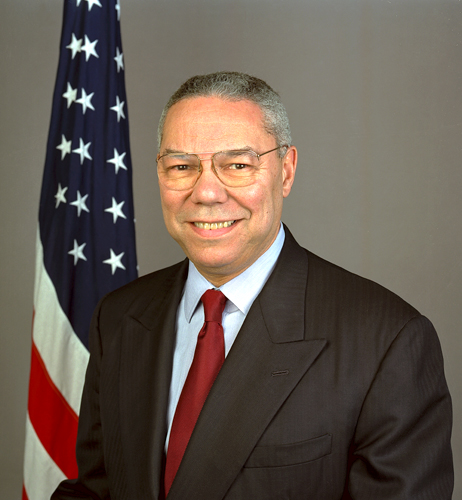
Colin Powell

==== Cabinet ====
- Alberto Gonzales — Attorney General, then serving as White House Counsel
- Colin Powell — former Secretary of State on August 16, 2004

==== CIA ====
- George Tenet — former Director
  - Bill Harlow — former spokesman
  - John McLaughlin — Deputy Director

==== Vice-president's Office ====
- Irving Lewis "Scooter" Libby Jr. — Chief of Staff
  - Mary Matalin — former advisor

==== President ====
- Karen Hughes — former special advisor
- Karl Rove — Senior Advisor
  - Israel Hernandez — former advisor to Karl Rove, Commerce Department official
  - Susan Ralston — secretary to Karl Rove

==== White House Press Office ====
- Claire Buchan — Deputy Press Secretary
- Ari Fleischer — former Press Secretary
- Adam Levine (press aide) — former press aide
- Scott McClellan — Press Secretary

==== Other government officials ====
- Carl Ford — former director of Bureau of Intelligence and Research in the State Department.

==== Media ====
- Matt Cooper — Time journalist
- Judith Miller — The New York Times journalist
- Walter Pincus — Washington Post journalist
- Bob Woodward — Washington Post Assistant Managing Editor
- Robert Novak — columnist who published Plame's identity
- Viveca Novak — Time magazine reporter
- Tim Russert — NBC News senior correspondent, host of Meet the Press

==== Other ====
- Robert Luskin — attorney for Karl Rove.

=== Journalists and contempt of court ===
Several journalists have testified on this matter.

==== Novak ====
Columnist Robert Novak, who later admitted that the CIA attempted to dissuade him from revealing Plame's name in print, "appears to have made some kind of arrangement with the special prosecutor" (according to Newsweek) and he was not charged with contempt of court.

==== Cooper ====
On July 2, 2005, Karl Rove's lawyer, Robert Luskin, said that his client spoke to TIME reporter Matt Cooper "three or four days" before Plame's identity was first revealed in print by commentator Robert Novak. (Cooper's article in TIME, citing unnamed and anonymous "government officials", confirmed Plame to be a "CIA official who monitors the proliferation of weapons of mass destruction". Cooper's article appeared three days after Novak's column was published.) Rove's lawyer, however, asserted that Rove "never knowingly disclosed classified information" and that "he did not tell any reporter that Valerie Plame worked for the CIA". This second statement has since been called into question by an e-mail, written three days before Novak's column, in which Cooper indicated that Rove had told him Wilson's wife worked at the CIA. If Rove were aware that this was classified information at the time, then both disclaimers by his lawyer would be untrue. Furthermore, Luskin said that Rove himself had testified before the grand jury "two or three times" (three times, according to the Los Angeles Times of July 3, 2005) and signed a waiver authorizing reporters to testify about their conversations with him and that Rove "has answered every question that has been put to him about his conversations with Cooper and anybody else." Rove's lawyer declined to share with Newsweek reporter Michael Isikoff the nature or contents of his client's conversations with Cooper.

On July 6, 2005, Cooper agreed to testify, thus avoiding being held in contempt of court and sent to jail. Cooper said "I went to bed ready to accept the sanctions for not testifying", but told the judge that not long before his early afternoon appearance at court he had received "in somewhat dramatic fashion" an indication from his source freeing him from his commitment to keep his source's identity secret. For some observers this called into question the allegations against Rove, who had signed a waiver months before permitting reporters to testify about their conversations with him (see above paragraph).

Cooper, however, stated in court that he did not previously accept a general waiver to journalists signed by his source (whom he did not identify by name), because he had made a personal pledge of confidentiality to his source. The 'dramatic change' which allowed Cooper to testify was later revealed to be a phone conversation between lawyers for Cooper and his source confirming that the waiver signed two years earlier applied to conversations with Cooper. Citing a "person who has been officially briefed on the case", The New York Times identified Rove as the individual in question, a fact later confirmed by Rove's own lawyer. According to one of Cooper's lawyers, Cooper has previously testified before the grand jury regarding conversations with Lewis "Scooter" Libby Jr., chief of staff for Vice President Dick Cheney, after having received Libby's specific permission to testify.

Cooper testified before a grand jury on July 13, 2005, confirming that Rove was the source who told him Wilson's wife was an employee of the CIA. In the July 17, 2005 TIME magazine article detailing his grand jury testimony, Cooper wrote that Rove never used Plame's name nor indicated that she had covert status, although Rove did apparently convey that certain information relating to her was classified: "As for Wilson's wife, I told the grand jury I was certain that Rove never used her name and that, indeed, I did not learn her name until the following week, when I either saw it in Robert Novak's column or Googled her, I can't recall which, ... [but] was it through my conversation with Rove that I learned for the first time that Wilson's wife worked at the C.I.A. and may have been responsible for sending him? Yes. Did Rove say that she worked at the 'agency' on 'W.M.D.'? Yes. When he said things would be declassified soon, was that itself impermissible? I don't know. Is any of this a crime? Beats me." Cooper also explained to the grand jury that the "double super secret background" under which Rove spoke to him was not an official White House or TIME magazine source or security designation, but an allusion to the 1978 film Animal House, in which a college fraternity is placed under "double secret probation".

==== Miller ====
New York Times investigative reporter Judith Miller, who met with Lewis Libby on July 8, 2003, two days after Wilson's editorial was published, never wrote or reported a story on the Plame affair, but nevertheless refused (with Cooper) to answer questions before a grand jury in 2004 pertaining to confidential sources. Both reporters were held in contempt of court. On June 27, 2005, after the U.S. Supreme Court refused to grant certiorari, TIME magazine said it would surrender to Fitzgerald e-mail records and notes taken by Cooper, and Cooper agreed to testify before the grand jury after receiving a waiver from his source. Miller and Cooper faced potential jail terms for failure to cooperate with the Special Counsel's investigations.

New York Times reporter Judith Miller served a civil contempt jail sentence from early July 2005 to September 29, 2005, for refusing to testify to the grand jury.

Miller was jailed on July 7, 2005, in Alexandria, Virginia. She was released on September 29, upon reaching an agreement with Fitzgerald to testify at a hearing scheduled on the morning of September 30, 2005. Miller indicated that her source, unlike Cooper's, had not sufficiently waived confidentiality. She issued a statement at a press conference after her release, stating that her source, Lewis Libby, Vice President Dick Cheney's Chief of Staff, had released her from her promise of confidentiality, saying her source "voluntarily and personally released [her] from [her] promise of confidentiality".

In August 2005 the American Prospect magazine reported that Lewis Libby testified he had discussed Plame with Miller during a July 8, 2003, meeting. Libby signed a general waiver allowing journalists to reveal their discussions with him on this matter, but American Prospect reported that Miller refused to honor this waiver on the grounds that she considered it coerced. Miller had said she would accept a specific individual waiver to testify, but contends Libby had not given her one until late September 2005. In contrast, Libby's lawyer has insisted that he had fully released Miller to testify all along.

On October 16, 2005, Judith Miller published an account of her grand jury testimony for The New York Times. In the article, titled "My Four Hours Testifying in the Federal Grand Jury Room", Miller writes:

My notes indicate that well before Mr. Wilson published his critique, Mr. Libby told me that Mr. Wilson's wife may have worked on unconventional weapons at the C.I.A. My notes do not show that Mr. Libby identified Mr. Wilson's wife by name. Nor do they show that he described Valerie Wilson as a covert agent or "operative", as the conservative columnist Robert D. Novak first described her in a syndicated column published on July 14, 2003. (Mr. Novak used her maiden name, Valerie Plame.) ... My interview notes show that Mr. Libby sought from the beginning, before Mr. Wilson's name became public, to insulate his boss from Mr. Wilson's charges. According to my notes, he told me at our June meeting that Mr. Cheney did not know of Mr. Wilson, much less know that Mr. Wilson had traveled to Niger, in West Africa, to verify reports that Iraq was seeking to acquire uranium for a weapons program ... Although I was interested primarily in my area of expertise — chemical and biological weapons — my notes show that Mr. Libby consistently steered our conversation back to the administration's nuclear claims. His main theme echoed that of other senior officials: that contrary to Mr. Wilson's criticism, the administration had had ample reason to be concerned about Iraq's nuclear capabilities based on the regime's history of weapons development, its use of unconventional weapons and fresh intelligence reports. At that breakfast meeting, our conversation also turned to Mr. Wilson's wife. My notes contain a phrase inside parentheses: "Wife works at Winpac." Mr. Fitzgerald asked what that meant. Winpac stood for Weapons Intelligence, Non-Proliferation, and Arms Control, the name of a unit within the C.I.A. that, among other things, analyzes the spread of unconventional weapons. I said I couldn't be certain whether I had known Ms. Plame's identity before this meeting, and I had no clear memory of the context of our conversation that resulted in this notation. But I told the grand jury that I believed that this was the first time I had heard that Mr. Wilson's wife worked for Winpac. In fact, I told the grand jury that when Mr. Libby indicated that Ms. Plame worked for Winpac, I assumed that she worked as an analyst, not as an undercover operative ... Mr. Fitzgerald asked me about another entry in my notebook, where I had written the words "Valerie Flame", clearly a reference to Ms. Plame. Mr. Fitzgerald wanted to know whether the entry was based on my conversations with Mr. Libby. I said I didn't think so. I said I believed the information came from another source, whom I could not recall.

=== The investigation expands to perjury and obstruction ===
On May 13, 2005, citing "close followers of the case", The Washington Post reported that the length of the investigation, and the particular importance paid to the testimony of reporters, suggested that the counsel's role had expanded to include investigation of perjury charges against witnesses. Other observers have suggested that the testimony of journalists was needed to show a pattern of intent by the leaker or leakers.

On October 6, 2005, Fitzgerald recalled Karl Rove, for the fourth time, to take the stand before the grand jury investigating the leak of Plame's identity. Fitzgerald had indicated that the only remaining witnesses to call were Cooper and Miller before he would close his case.

=== Indictment of Libby ===
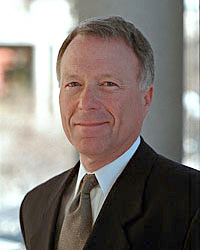
Lewis "Scooter" Libby

On October 28, 2005, the grand jury issued a five-count indictment against Lewis Libby, Vice President Dick Cheney's Chief of Staff, on felony charges of perjury, obstruction of justice, and making false statements to the FBI and the grand jury investigating the matter.

Libby was charged with lying to FBI agents and to the grand jury about two conversations with reporters, Tim Russert of NBC News and Matt Cooper of Time magazine. According to the Indictment, the obstruction of justice count alleges that while testifying under oath before the grand jury on March 5, and March 24, 2004, Libby knowingly and corruptly endeavored to influence, obstruct and impede the grand jury's investigation by misleading and deceiving the grand jury as to when, and the manner and means by which, he acquired, and subsequently disclosed to the media, information concerning the employment of Valerie Wilson by the CIA.

From January 20, 2001, to October 28, 2005, Libby served as assistant to the president, chief of staff to the vice president, and assistant to the vice president for national security affairs. After the indictment was released to the public, Libby resigned his position in the White House.

On November 3, 2005, I. Lewis "Scooter" Libby entered a not guilty plea in front of U.S. District Judge Reggie Walton, a former prosecutor who has spent two decades as a judge in the nation's capital.

== United States v. Libby ==
=== The second grand jury ===
The first grand jury's term expired on October 28, the day it indicted Libby. On November 18, 2005, Fitzgerald submitted new court papers indicating that he would use a new grand jury to assist him in his ongoing investigation. The use of a new grand jury could indicate that additional evidence or charges are coming, but experienced federal prosecutors cautioned against reading too much into Fitzgerald's disclosure:

"It could just mean that the prosecutor needs the powers of the grand jury" to further his investigation and make a final determination whether to charge, said Dan French, a former federal prosecutor now representing a witness in the inquiry.

"One of the greatest powers of the grand jury is the ability to subpoena witnesses ... and Fitzgerald may want that authority to pursue additional questions", French said. He might also need subpoenas to obtain documents, telephone records and executive branch agency security logs.

After a six-week break, special prosecutor Patrick J. Fitzgerald presented information to a new grand jury on December 8, 2005.

=== Court proceedings ===
Due to the huge amount of classified material that had been requested by Libby's defense, David Corn speculated that Libby was using Graymail as defense tactic. Libby had added the graymail expert John D. Cline to his defense team.

In December 2005, Patrick Fitzgerald responded to a motion by Dow Jones & Company, Inc., to unseal all or part of the redacted portion of a United States Court of Appeals for the District of Columbia opinion issued on February 15, 2005. The opinion pertained to oral arguments held on December 8, 2004. The opinion of the court was released on February 3, 2006, to the public. It states:

As to the leaks' harmfulness, although the record omits specifics about Plame's work, it appears to confirm, as alleged in the public record and reported in the press, that she worked for the CIA in some unusual capacity relating to counterproliferation. Addressing deficiencies of proof regarding the Intelligence Identities Protection Act, the special counsel refers to Plame as "a person whose identity the CIA was making specific efforts to conceal and who had carried out covert work overseas within the last 5 years" — representations I trust the special counsel would not make without support. (8/27/04 Aff. at 28 n.15.)

On January 31, 2006, letters exchanged between Libby's lawyers and Fitzgerald's office concerning matters of discovery were released to the public. Reportedly, Fitzgerald states:

A formal assessment has not been done of the damage caused by the disclosure of Valerie Wilson's status as a CIA employee, and thus we possess no such document. In any event, we would not view an assessment of the damage caused by the disclosure as relevant to the issue of whether or not Mr. Libby intentionally lied when he made the statements and gave the grand jury testimony which the grand jury alleged was false.

On March 17, 2006, Patrick Fitzgerald filed the government's response to a motion by Scooter Libby's defense team to dismiss the indictments.

On April 5, 2006, Patrick Fitzgerald filed the government's response to a motion by Scooter Libby's defense team on issues of discovery. On April 12, 2006, Fitzgerald issued a correction to some of the information in the government's motion. In the memo, he writes:

Nor would such documents of the CIA, NSC and the State Department place in context the importance of the conversations in which defendant participated. Defendant's participation in a critical conversation with Judith Miller on July 8 (discussed further below) occurred only after the Vice President advised defendant that the president specifically had authorized defendant to disclose certain information in the NIE. Defendant testified that the circumstances of his conversation with reporter Miller — getting approval from the president through the vice president to discuss material that would be classified but for that approval — were unique in his recollection. Defendant further testified that on July 12, 2003, he was specifically directed by the Vice President to speak to the press in place of Cathie Martin (then the communications person for the Vice President) regarding the NIE and Wilson. Defendant was instructed to provide what was for him an extremely rare "on the record" statement, and to provide "background" and "deep background" statements, and to provide information contained in a document defendant understood to be the cable authored by Mr. Wilson. During the conversations that followed on July 12, defendant discussed Ms. Wilson's employment with both Matthew Cooper (for the first time) and Judith Miller (for the third time). Even if someone else in some other agency thought that the controversy about Mr. Wilson and/or his wife was a trifle, that person's state of mind would be irrelevant to the importance and focus defendant placed on the matter and the importance he attached to the surrounding conversations he was directed to engage in by the Vice President.

Karl Rove testified before the new grand jury for the fifth time in the case on April 26, 2006, and, on June 12, 2006, his attorney stated that Rove had been formally notified by Fitzgerald that Rove would not be charged with any crimes.

According to Mike Allen, in Time magazine, Rove's attorney Robert D. Luskin told reporters that he received a fax from Fitzgerald indicating that "absent any unexpected developments, he does not anticipate seeking any criminal charges against Rove". John Solomon of Associated Press reported that the news came by telephone rather than fax. The New York Times reported that the news was announced by Fitzgerald "in a letter to Mr. Luskin". Luskin's own public statement indicated only that he was "formally advised" of this news by Fitzgerald, and Luskin's office has so far refused to comment further on that statement.

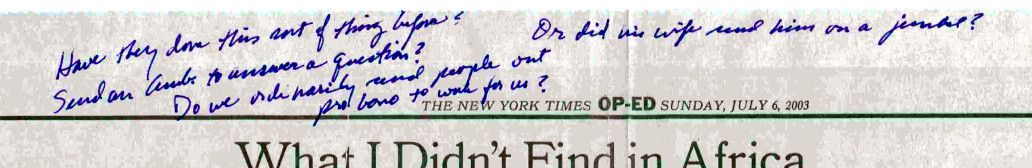
A handwritten note above Joe Wilson's editorial by Vice President Dick Cheney. Cheney wrote: "Have they done this sort of thing before?" "Send an amb(assador) to answer a question?" "Do we ordinarily send people out pro bono to work for us? "Or did his wife send him on a junket?".

In a court filing on May 12, 2006, Fitzgerald included a copy of Wilson's op-ed article in The New York Times "bearing handwritten notations by the vice president" (See photograph). Fitzgerald's filing declares that Libby ascertained Plame's name from Cheney through conferences by the vice president's office about "how to respond to a June 2003 inquiry from Washington Post reporter Walter Pincus about Wilson's trip to Niger". In the filing, Fitzgerald states:

The June 12, 2003, Washington Post article by Mr. Pincus (to whom both Mr. Wilson and the defendant spoke prior to publication of the article) is relevant because Mr. Pincus' questions to the OVP sparked discussion within the OVP, including conversations between the defendant and the Vice President regarding how Mr. Pincus' questions should be answered. It was during a conversation concerning Mr. Pincus' inquiries that the Vice President advised the defendant that Mr. Wilson's wife worked at the CIA. (To be clear, the government does not contend that the defendant disclosed the employment of Ms. Plame to Mr. Pincus, and Mr. Pincus's article contains no reference to her or her employment.) The article by Mr. Pincus thus explains the context in which the defendant discussed Mr. Wilson's wife's employment with the Vice President. The article also served to increase media attention concerning the then-unnamed ambassador's trip and further motivated the defendant to counter Mr. Wilson's assertions, making it more likely that the defendant's disclosures to the press concerning Mr. Wilson's wife were not casual disclosures that he had forgotten by the time he was asked about them by the Federal Bureau of Investigation and before the grand jury.

Fitzgerald sought to compel Matt Cooper, a Time magazine correspondent who had covered the story, to disclose his sources to a grand jury. After losing all legal appeals up through the Supreme Court, Time turned over Cooper's notes to the prosecutor. Cooper agreed to testify after receiving permission from his source, Karl Rove, to do so. Robert Luskin confirmed Rove was Cooper's source. A July 11, 2003, e-mail from Cooper to his bureau chief indicated that Rove had told Cooper that it was Wilson's wife who authorized her husband's trip to Niger, mentioning that she "apparently" worked at "the agency" on weapons of mass destruction issues. Newsweek reported that nothing in the Cooper e-mail suggested that Rove used Plame's name or knew she was a covert operative, although Cooper's Time magazine article describing his grand jury testimony noted that Rove said, "I've already said too much". Neither Newsweek nor Time released the complete Cooper e-mail.

On May 16, 2006, a transcript of court proceedings before Judge Reggie B. Walton was released. Libby's lawyers sought communications between Matthew Cooper and Massimo Calabresi, authors of an article published by Time magazine on July 17, 2003, and titled, "A War on Wilson?" Libby's lawyers contend that Massimo called Joe Wilson after Cooper learned from Karl Rove that Wilson's wife worked at the CIA. Libby's lawyers also told the judge they have an e-mail Cooper sent to his editor describing a July 12, 2003, conversation with Libby in which there is no mention of Plame or her CIA status. An e-mail was sent to Cooper's editor on July 16, 2003, "four days after his conversation with Mr. Libby and 5 days after his conversation with Mr. Rove, about the article they are planning to write in which they are going to mention the wife. And the e-mail says — talks about him having an administration source for the information about Ms. Wilson". Thus, Libby's lawyers sought communications between Massimo and Cooper to determine if Cooper conveyed to Massimo that Libby was a source as well for the information on Wilson's wife:

And I submit to Your Honor there is — as you can see, the credibility of Mr. Cooper with respect to his description that Mr. Libby confirmed M[s]. Plame's employment by the C.I.A. is going to be very much at issue in this case. And that is what cases are all about, and we should be entitled to anything that Mr. Cooper has said or that others have said or done, such as Mr. Massimo talking to Mr. Wilson on the basis of what Cooper said. And that kind of information is directly relevant to the cross-examination, and we submit that it should be enforced. And certainly we have established specificity with respect to that. The other thing I would say is this is the first I have heard that Time has a document that refers to Ms. Plame. Now, perhaps, that's Mr. Cooper's communication with Mr. Massimo, or perhaps it is Mr. Massimo's notes with Mr. Wilson. I don't know, but certainly if there is a document that does refer to Ms. Plame prior to July 14, we submit that that's relevant and should be produced as well. That's all I have on Time and Cooper, Your Honor.

On May 26, 2006, Judge Walton ruled on the motion:

However, upon reviewing the documents presented to it, the Court discerns a slight alteration between the several drafts of the articles, which the defense could arguably use to impeach Cooper. This slight alteration between the drafts will permit the defendant to impeach Cooper, regardless of the substance of his trial testimony, because his trial testimony cannot be consistent with both versions. Thus, unlike Miller, whose documents appear internally consistent and thus will only be admissible if she testifies inconsistently with these documents, Cooper's documents will undoubtedly be admissible. Because of the inevitability that Cooper will be a government witness at trial, this Court can fathom no reason to delay the production of these documents to the defendant, as they will undoubtedly be admissible for impeachment.

For the reasons discussed above, this Court will grant reporter Judith Miller's motion to quash, and grant in part and deny in part the remaining motions. Therefore, at the appropriate times as designated in this opinion, those documents subject to production must be produced to the defendant so that they can be used as impeachment or contradiction evidence during the trial. In addition, based on the facts of this case, this Court declines to recognize a First Amendment reporters' privilege. And, the Court concludes that any common law reporters' privilege that may exist has been overcome by the defendant.

=== Richard Armitage is confirmed to be primary source of leak ===
On August 29, 2006, Neil A. Lewis reported in The New York Times that Richard Armitage has been confirmed to be the first and primary source of the CIA leak investigation. On August 30, 2006, CNN reported that Armitage had been confirmed "by sources" as leaking Valerie Plame's role as a CIA operative in a "casual conversation" with Robert Novak.

On September 6, 2006, The New York Times noted that in 2003, early in his investigation, Fitzgerald knew Armitage was the primary source of the leak. The Times raised questions as to why the investigation proceeded as long as it did. New York Times

According to lawyers close to Libby, "the information about Mr. Armitage's role may help Mr. Libby convince a jury that his actions were relatively inconsequential".

Fitzgerald never issued a statement about Armitage's involvement.

=== The trial ===
The trial began on January 16, 2007.

Libby, who was questioned by the FBI in the fall of 2003 and testified before a Federal grand jury on March 5, 2004, and again on March 24, 2004, pleaded not guilty to all charges.

Libby retained attorney Ted Wells of the firm of Paul, Weiss, Rifkind, Wharton & Garrison to represent him in the case.

On January 23, 2007, the Associated Press reported that Wells alleged "that administration officials sought to blame Libby for the leak to protect Bush political adviser Karl Rove's own disclosures".

After Libby's motion to dismiss was denied, the press initially reported that he would testify at the trial. In February 2007, during the trial, however, numerous press reports stressed that whether or not he will testify was still uncertain, and, ultimately, he did not testify at trial.

The jury received the case for their deliberation on February 21, 2007.

==== Verdict ====
After deliberating for ten days, the jury rendered its verdict at noon on March 6, 2007. It convicted Libby on four of the five counts against him — two counts of perjury, one count of obstructing justice in a grand jury investigation, and one of the two counts of making false statements to federal investigators — and acquitted him on one count of making false statements. Given current federal sentencing guidelines, which are not mandatory, the convictions could result in a sentence ranging from no imprisonment to imprisonment of up to 25 years and a fine of one million US dollars. Given those non-binding guidelines, according to lawyer, author, New Yorker staff writer, and CNN senior legal analyst Jeffrey Toobin on Anderson Cooper 360°, such a sentence could likely be between "one and a half to three years". Sentencing was scheduled for June 2007. His lawyers have announced their intention to seek a new trial and, if that attempt fails, to appeal Libby's conviction.

==== Comment on the verdict by juror ====
As reported in CNN Newsroom, and subsequently on Larry King Live on CNN and by various other television networks, including MSNBC (on Scarborough Country), one juror — "Denis Collins, a Washington resident and self-described registered Democrat", who is a journalist and former reporter at The Washington Post and the author of a book on espionage and a novel — "said he and fellow jurors found that passing judgment on Libby was 'unpleasant.' But in the final analysis, he said jurors found Libby's story just too hard to believe ... 'We're not saying we didn't think Mr. Libby was guilty of the things we found him guilty of, but it seemed like ... he was the fall guy' ... Collins said the jury believed Libby was 'tasked by the vice president to go and talk to reporters.'" Collins offers a day-by-day account of his experience as Juror #9 at the Libby trial in an "Exclusive" at The Huffington Post.

=== Press coverage of the trial ===
Blogs have played a prominent role in the press coverage of this trial. Scott Shane, in his article "For Liberal Bloggers, Libby Trial Is Fun and Fodder", published in The New York Times on February 15, 2007, quotes Robert Cox, president of the Media Bloggers Association, who observes that United States of America v. I. Lewis Libby is "the first federal case for which independent bloggers have been given official credentials along with reporters from the traditional news media".

== Karl Rove ==
On June 13, 2006, Robert Luskin released the following statement:

On June 12, 2006, Special Counsel Patrick Fitzgerald formally advised us that he does not anticipate seeking charges against Karl Rove. In deference to the pending case, we will not make any further public statements about the subject matter of the investigation. We believe that the Special Counsel's decision should put an end to the baseless speculation about Mr. Rove's conduct.

On June 14, 2006, Joe Wilson responded to Luskin's statement by stating that "this is a marathon ... it's not over." He referred other questions to a statement released by his lawyer, Christopher Wolf. In the statement, Wolf stated that "while it appears that Mr. Rove will not be called to answer in criminal court for his participation in the wrongful disclosure of Valerie Wilson's classified employment status at the CIA, that obviously does not end the matter. The day still may come when Mr. Rove and others are called to account in a court of law for their attacks on the Wilsons."

Following the revelations in the Libby indictment, sixteen former CIA and military intelligence officials urged President Bush to suspend Karl Rove's security clearance for his part in outing CIA officer Valerie Plame.

== Media request CIA to unseal records ==
On December 22, 2006, the Associated Press reported that AP and Dow Jones, parent company of The Wall Street Journal, have requested a federal court to force the CIA to release testimony records. The AP and Dow Jones allege that special prosecutor Fitzgerald never needed to subpoena the media's records, including those of The New York Times and Washington Post, because he knew the source of the leak all along.

== Criticism ==
Because the Justice Department is a part of the executive branch, some critics of the Bush administration contend that the absence of rapid and effective action has been deliberate.

General Paul E. Vallely has criticized Special Counsel Patrick Fitzgerald on FOX News for not contacting a number of people who publicly stated they knew of Plame's job at the CIA.

Many of us as private citizens really challenged the depth and the extensiveness of Special Prosecutor Fitzgerald because he never called in Joe Wilson or Valerie Plame, who was an analyst by the way, and that's documented, or any of the hierarchy of the CIA. And so to me that's an incomplete process and should probably be null and void.

General Vallely has been criticized by some for allegedly lying about his part in the affair. Vallely has claimed that Joe Wilson informed him that his wife was a covert agent, but did not reveal this until more than two years after the fact, and a year and a half after the investigation had begun.

An editorial in The Washington Post reads:

The special counsel was principally investigating whether any official violated a law that makes it a crime to knowingly disclose the identity of an undercover agent. The public record offers no indication that Mr. Libby or any other official deliberately exposed Ms. Plame to punish her husband, former ambassador Joseph C. Wilson IV. Rather, Mr. Libby and other officials, including Karl Rove, the White House deputy chief of staff, apparently were seeking to combat the sensational allegations of a critic. They may have believed that Ms. Plame's involvement was an important part of their story of why Mr. Wilson was sent to investigate claims that Iraq sought uranium ore from Niger, and why his subsequent — and mostly erroneous — allegations that the administration twisted that small part of the case against Saddam Hussein should not be credited. To criminalize such discussions between officials and reporters would run counter to the public interest ... That said, the charges Mr. Fitzgerald brought against Mr. Libby are not technicalities. According to the indictment, Mr. Libby lied to both the FBI and a grand jury. No responsible prosecutor would overlook a pattern of deceit like that alleged by Mr. Fitzgerald. The prosecutor was asked to investigate a serious question, and such obstructions are, as he said yesterday, like throwing sand in the umpire's face. In this case, they seem to have contributed to Mr. Fitzgerald's distressing decision to force a number of journalists to testify about conversations with a confidential source. Both Mr. Libby and Mr. Rove appear to have allowed the White House spokesman to put out false information about their involvement.

John W. Dean, the former counsel to Richard Nixon, writes in an open letter to Patrick Fitzgerald:

In your post as Special Counsel, you now have nothing less than authority of the Attorney General of the United States, for purposes of the investigation and prosecution of "the alleged unauthorized disclosure of a CIA employee's identity." (The employee, of course, is Valerie Plame Wilson, a CIA employee with classified status, and the wife of former Ambassador Joseph Wilson.) On December 30, 2003, you received a letter from the Deputy Attorney General regarding your powers. On February 6, 2004, you received a letter of further clarification, stating without reservation, that in this matter your powers are "plenary." In effect, then, you act with the power of the Attorney General of the United States.

In light of your broad powers, the limits and narrow focus of your investigation are surprising. On October 28 of this year, your office released a press statement in which you stated that "A major focus of the grand jury investigation was to determine which government officials had disclosed to the media prior to July 14, 2003, information concerning Valerie Wilson's CIA affiliation, and the nature, timing, extent, and purpose of such disclosures, as well as whether any official made such a disclosure knowing that Valerie Wilson's employment by the CIA was classified information."

Troubling, from an historical point of view, is the fact that the narrowness of your investigation, which apparently is focusing on the Intelligence Identities Protection Act (making it a crime to uncover the covert status of a CIA agent), plays right into the hands of perpetrators in the Administration.

Indeed, this is exactly the plan that was employed during Watergate by those who sought to conceal the Nixon Administration's crimes, and keep criminals in office.

The plan was to keep the investigation focused on the break-in at the Democratic National Committee headquarters — and away from the atmosphere in which such an action was undertaken. Toward this end, I was directed by superiors to get the Department of Justice to keep its focus on the break-in, and nothing else.

That was done. And had Congress not undertaken its own investigation (since it was a Democratically-controlled Congress with a Republican President) it is very likely that Watergate would have ended with the conviction of those caught in the bungled burglary and wiretapping attempt at the Democratic headquarters.

== Federal laws ==
Crimes

- Conspiracy
- Contempt
- Intelligence Identities Protection Act of 1982 (full text)
- Making false statements
- Obstruction
- Perjury
- Treason

Fitzgerald's position

- Special Counsel (under Department of Justice regulation 28 CFR Part 600)

== Attorneys of record ==
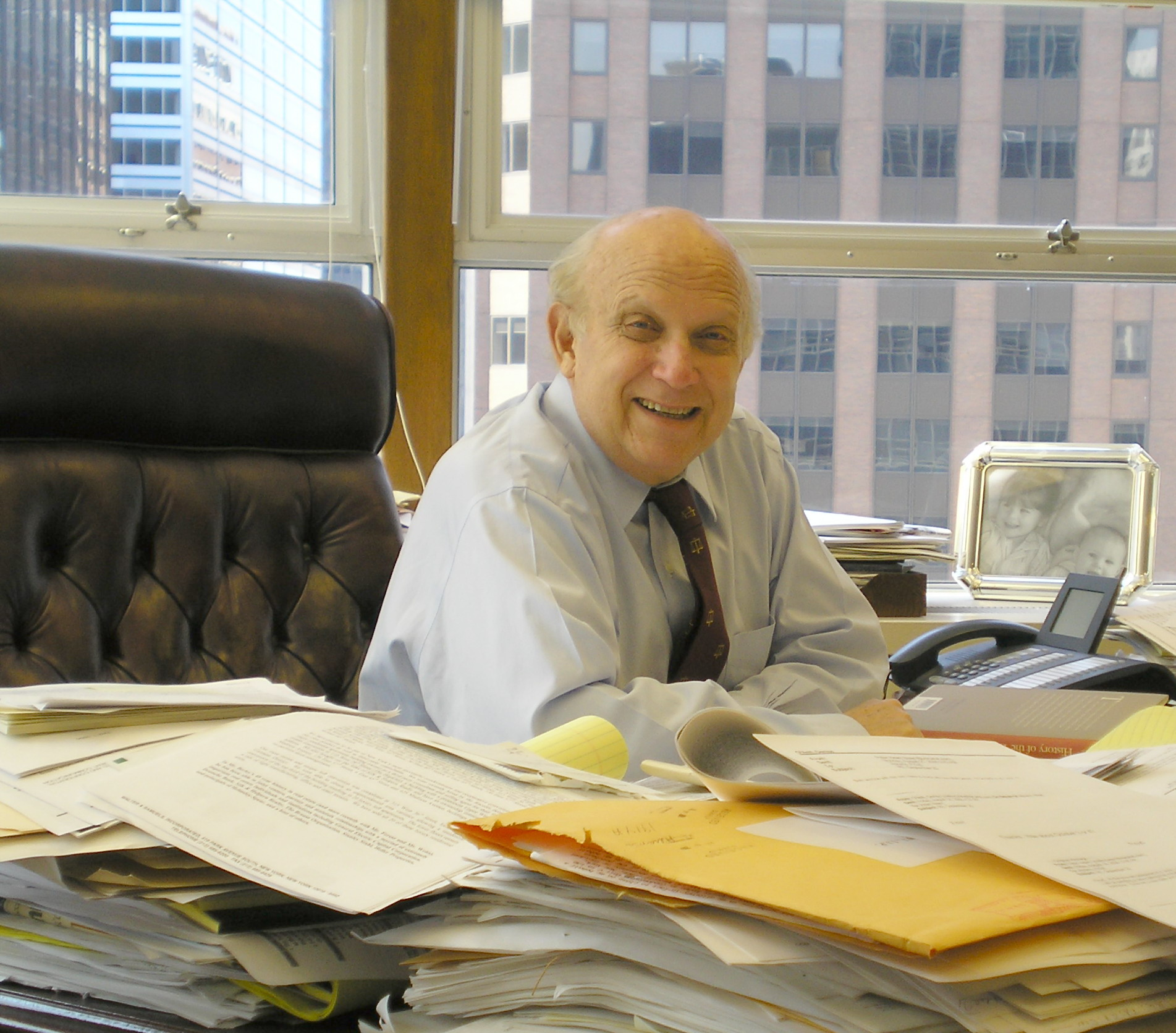
Floyd Abrams represented Judith Miller

- Floyd Abrams — for Judith Miller, journalist at the New York Times.
- Robert S. Bennett — for Judith Miller, journalist at the New York Times.
- Daniel French — for Adam Levine, former White House press office staffer.
- James Hamilton — for Robert Novak, syndicated journalist and media person.
- William Jeffress — for Lewis Libby, former Vice-president Chief of Staff.
- Don Kinsella — for Adam Levine, former White House press office staffer.
- Robert Luskin — for Karl Rove.
- Terrence O'Donnell — for Vice President Dick Cheney
- James E. Sharp — for President George W. Bush.
- Joseph Tate — for Lewis Libby, former Vice President Chief of Staff.
- Ted Wells — for Lewis Libby, former Vice-president Chief of Staff.
- Christopher Wolf — for Joseph Wilson and wife, Valerie Plame.

== Judges, special counsel attorneys, and courthouses ==
=== Judges ===
- Judge Thomas Hogan — Chief U.S. District Judge
- Judge Reggie Walton — U.S. District Judge

=== Special Counsel Office Attorneys ===
- Patrick Fitzgerald, Special Counsel, U.S. Attorney for the Northern District of Illinois
  - Debra Riggs Bonamici, Deputy Special Counsel, from US Attorney's Office, Northern District of Illinois
  - Kathleen Kedian, Deputy Special Counsel, from the U.S. Department of Justice, Washington DC
  - James Fleissner, Deputy Special Counsel, Department of Justice (DOJ)
  - Ron Roos, Deputy Special Counsel, DoJ prosecutor — National Security Section.
  - Peter Zeidenberg, Deputy Special Counsel, DoJ prosecutor — Public Integrity Section.

=== Courthouses ===
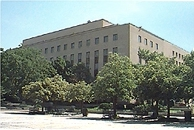
Prettyman Courthouse

Location of CIA leak grand jury

- E. Barrett Prettyman United States Courthouse 333 Constitution Avenue, N.W., Washington, D.C.

== Pop culture ==
Another film closely paralleling the case is Nothing But the Truth, directed by Rod Lurie and starring Kate Beckinsale as a reporter who is imprisoned for revealing the identity of a CIA agent (played by Vera Farmiga), but not the sources of her information. The movie was released in 2008.

== See also ==
- Plame affair
- United States v. Libby
