= Joseph Tate =

American attorney

Joseph Tate is an American attorney who represented government official Lewis Libby in the CIA leak grand jury investigation. Tate is a partner with the law firm Dechert LLP in Philadelphia, Pennsylvania. Previously, Tate worked in the Antitrust Division of the United States Department of Justice.

== Education ==
Tate graduated from Villanova University in 1963 and Villanova University School of Law in 1966. He was a member of the Villanova University Law Review.

== Involvement with the CIA leak grand jury investigation ==
Tate, acting as Lewis Libby's attorney, has spoken publicly about the Libby's involvement in the CIA leak grand jury investigation. In particular, Tate discussed Libby's connection to the New York Times journalist Judith Miller. Miller spent 85 days in jail for refusing to disclose the identity of her source, an unidentified government official. Despite speculation to the contrary, Tate repeatedly denied that Libby was the source that Miller was protecting. Special Counsel Patrick Fitzgerald, investigating the CIA leak, wrote to Tate on September 12, 2005 to clarify that communication between Libby and Miller would not be obstruction of justice. Fitzgerald knew that Libby was the government official that Miller refused to discuss. Tate continues to deny that Libby was Miller's protected source, instead, insisting that a written waiver was provided a year ago. Miller was eventually released from jail, after Libby contacted Miller by phone with Tate and Miller's attorney's listening.

== Letter related to CIA leak investigation ==
- September 12, 2005 Letter from Special Prosecutor Patrick Fitzgerald to Joseph A. Tate, I. Lewis Libby‘s attorney. Identifies Libby as the ‘unidentified government official’ and encourages Libby to give a personal waiver to Miller, assuring him that communication between them would not be obstruction of justice.

== See also ==
- CIA leak grand jury investigation
- Plame Affair
- Judith Miller
