= James Fleissner =

American lawyer

James P. Fleissner (Jim) is an American attorney and a Professor of Law at Mercer University School of Law in Macon, Georgia. While at Mercer, Fleissner has remained Special Assistant United States Attorney and Deputy Special Counsel. As Deputy Special Counsel, Fleissner was lead counsel in litigation regarding motions filed by journalists to quash subpoenas and contempt proceedings in the CIA leak grand jury investigation.

== CIA leak grand jury investigation ==
Fleissner is deputy to Special Counsel Patrick Fitzgerald in the Justice Department investigation into allegations that one or more government officials illegally disclosed the identity of a CIA agent. As Deputy Special Counsel, he briefed and argued the case to the D.C. Circuit and the Supreme Court. Fleissner argued that a First Amendment protection exists for reporters, but only in a limited way, such as for intimidation or bad-faith investigations.

== Education ==
Fleissner attended Marquette University High School where he was a championship debater for the school's Webster Club. After graduating in 1975, he went on to coach the debate team at his alma mater while attending Marquette University. He graduated summa cum laude with a B.A. in 1979 and earned a J.D. in 1986 from the University of Chicago Law School.

== Career ==
Fleissner has been a member of the Mercer Law Faculty since 1994. The courses he has taught include Criminal Law, Criminal Procedure: Constitutional Dimensions, Criminal Procedure: The Litigation Process, Trial Practice, and Evidence. He has been a visiting professor at Georgia State University College of Law, Spring 2002 (Criminal Law) and the DePaul University College of Law, Spring 2004 (Criminal Law), Summer 2004 (Evidence), Fall 2004 (Criminal Procedure), and Spring 2005 (Evidence).

Before joining the Mercer faculty, Fleissner worked as Assistant United States Attorney in Chicago from 1986 to 1994. During a leave of absence from Mercer Law School (January 2003-July 2005), Fleissner was Assistant United States Attorney and Chief of Appeals, Criminal Division, for the Office of the United States Attorney, Northern District of Illinois. Now, he is a Deputy Special Counsel in United States Department of Justice Office of Special Counsel. As Deputy Special Counsel, Fleissner managed litigation regarding motions filed by journalists to quash subpoenas and contempt proceedings in the CIA leak grand jury investigation. Fleissner is licensed to practice law in Illinois and Georgia.

== Media ==
After the Oklahoma City bombing, Fleissner appeared on the PBS "Newshour with Jim Lehrer," CNN, and MSNBC to discuss the prosecutions and other federal criminal matters.

== Major cases ==
- JUDITH MILLER, PETITIONER v. UNITED STATES OF AMERICA
- MATTHEW COOPER AND TIME INC., PETITIONERS v. UNITED STATES OF AMERICA
- GOVERNM ENT’S MEMORANDUM IN OPPOSITION TO MATTHEW COOPER’S MEMORANDUM REGARDING THE CONTEMPT SANCTION

== Sources ==
- Extent of press rights debated Washington Times December 08, 2004
- Reporter Held in Contempt of Court Again in Leaks Probe Washington Post Susan Schmidt October 14, 2004
