= Peter Zeidenberg =

American trial lawyer

Peter R. Zeidenberg is an American trial lawyer. He has been an Assistant District Attorney in Middlesex County, Massachusetts, an Assistant US Attorney in the District of Columbia and at the Department of Justice Public Integrity Section. On August 13, 2007, DLA Piper announced that he had become a partner at their Washington, DC office.

== Education ==
Zeidenberg obtained a BA from the University of Wisconsin–Madison and then attended Boston College Law School where he graduated in 1985.

== Major cases ==
Zeidenberg, was part of Special Counsel Patrick Fitzgerald's prosecution team in the CIA leak grand jury investigation which eventually resulted in the indictment and conviction of Scooter Libby in United States v. Libby. He was also the lead trial counsel in the case of United States vs. David H. Safavian. While he was successful in that case, his tactics were largely repudiated by the United States Court of Appeals for the District of Columbia, which reversed Safavian's conviction.

- United States v. Hsu, District of Columbia
- Sherri Chen
