= Murray Waas =

American investigative journalist

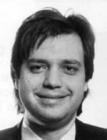
- Murray Waas, 2007
- Born: Philadelphia, Pennsylvania, U.S.

Murray S. Waas is an American investigative journalist known for his coverage of the White House's planning of the 2003 invasion of Iraq and American political scandals such as the Plame affair. For much of his career, Waas focused on national security reporting, but he has also written about social issues and corporate malfeasance. His articles have appeared in National Journal, The Atlantic, and The American Prospect.

== Education and early career ==
Waas was born in Philadelphia, Pennsylvania, and originally hoped to have a career in law and city politics. He briefly attended George Washington University before leaving to pursue a career in journalism. While still attending college, Waas began working for American newspaper columnist Jack Anderson. Waas first worked for columnist Anderson at age 18, the summer of his freshman year of college: "When I went out for interviews, the subjects took one look at me and just laughed... I was one of those 18-year-old kids who looked 15," he once recalled.

In 1987, when Waas was 26, he learned that he had a life-threatening advanced form of cancer. Years later, on June 26, 2006, Washington Post media writer Howard Kurtz wrote that Waas had been told that he had an "incurable Stage C" cancer and faced a "terminal diagnosis."

Subsequently, Waas successfully sued the George Washington University Medical Center, which had negligently "failed to diagnose his cancer." Waas won a $650,000 verdict in the case. The verdict, in turn, was later upheld by the D.C. Court of Appeals." Although, according to a report prepared by a pathologist who testified in the case, "over 90% of [such] patients... are dead within two years," Waas survived and was later declared "cancer-free"—his recovery and survival later described as a miracle by the physicians treating him. In winning the appeal of the jury's verdict by the hospital, the appeals court devised new case law expanding the rights of cancer patients and ordinary patients to pursue restitution through the courts because of medical mistakes.

In 2010, Waas won a Barlett & Steele Award for investigative business reporting for his report on insurance companies dropping patients with breast cancer. Waas' investigation revealed that a health insurance company "had targeted policyholders recently diagnosed with breast cancer for aggressive investigations with the intent to cancel their policies."

Waas is listed as a "Contributor Emeritus" on the masthead of The Village Voice.

During the Reagan administration, Waas was among a small group of reporters involved in breaking the story of the Iran-Contra affair.

Waas won an Alicia Patterson Journalism Fellowship in 1992 to research and write about the rights of the institutionalized and incarcerated in the U.S. For his fellowship, he investigated substandard conditions and questionable deaths at institutions for the intellectually disabled, mental hospitals, nursing homes, juvenile detention centers, and jails and prisons.

In 1998 and 1999, Waas reported on Whitewater and the Clinton impeachment for Salon.com.

== Idi Amin and economic sanctions ==
It was while working for Anderson, that Waas wrote more than a dozen columns exposing business dealings between American corporations and the genocidal African regime of Idi Amin; and other columns advocating that the United States impose economic sanctions against his regime.

A number of historians and academics have since concluded that the subsequent imposition of the sanctions led to the overthrow of the Amin regime and the end of genocide in that country. Several of the individuals involved in the political battle to have the sanctions imposed have credited Waas' reporting as indispensable to making the sanctions the law and official policy of the United States, without which Amin would have likely remained in power, and his genocide would have continued unabated.

Ralp Nurnberger, a former staffer on the Senate Foreign Relations Committee, and professor of international relations at Georgetown University, concluded in a study for the African Studies Review that the economic sanctions imposed against Amin by the U.S. likely led to Amin's downfall. Nurnberger wrote that the congressional initiative to impose the sanctions had attracted scant attention or support outside a small number of members of Congress and congressional staff interested in the matter until "Jack Anderson assigned one of his reporters, Murray Waas to follow the issue" and to regularly write about it. Nurnberger also characterized Waas' role as having "served as a useful contact for the congressional staff investigating this subject as well as Ugandan expatriates."

The tremendous reach of Anderson's column amplified Waas' reporting on Amin and his advocacy of sanctions. At the time, Anderson's columns were published in more than 1,000 newspapers, which in turn had 40 million readers. Waas was eighteen and nineteen years old at the time he wrote the series of columns.

The late Sen. Frank Church (D-Id.), a chairman of the Senate Foreign Committee, later said the congressionally imposed boycott "had a profound impact on the internal conditions [inside Uganda] and contributed to the fall of Idi Amin." Sen. Mark Hatfield (R-Or.), commented that the sanctions "provided the psychological and practical ingredients to complete a formula that would come to break Amin's seemingly invincible survivability."

In an article about the sanctions, published in 2003, Foreign Policy magazine concluded that the U.S.-imposed trade embargo "proved devastating to the Ugandan economy" and that "they helped set in motion the events that led to the fall of the regime."

== The covert Reagan and George H.W. Bush foreign policies leading up to the first U.S. war with Iraq ==
Following the presidency of George Herbert Walker Bush, in 1993, while a reporter for the Los Angeles Times, Waas, along with his Los Angeles Times colleague Douglas Frantz, was a finalist for the Pulitzer Prize in the category of national reporting for his stories detailing that administration's prewar foreign policy towards the Iraqi regime of Saddam Hussein That same year, Waas was also a recipient of the Goldsmith Prize for Investigative Reporting, awarded by the Joan Shorenstein Barone Center on The Press, of the John F. Kennedy School of Government of Harvard University, for "a series that detailed United States policy toward Iraq before the Persian Gulf war".

In a broader context, Waas' and Frantz's stories, ABC News Nightline anchor Ted Koppel said, made it "increasingly clear...that George Bush, operating largely behind the scenes.. initiated and supported the financing, intelligence, and military help that built Saddam's Iraq into the aggressive power that the United States ultimately had to destroy."

Writing in The New York Times, columnist Anthony Lewis similarly citing the reporting by Waas and Frantz, as well as that of Seymour Hersh, provided a "shocking answer" to those wondering how Saddam has grown into not only a regional menace but an international one: "The United States was feeding Saddam Hussein's war machine and his ambition." Lewis cited disclosures by Waas, Frantz, and Hersh, to show that this had been in large part due to the U.S. sharing secret intelligence with Iraq, and encouraging allies such as Saudi Arabia, Kuwait, and Jordan to transfer arms of U.S. origin to Saddam.

== The misrepresentation of intelligence by the George H.W. Bush administration during the run-up to war with Iraq ==
More recently, Waas worked as a national correspondent and contributing editor of National Journal Waas garnered attention for having been one of only a small number of mainstream press reporters questioning whether the George H.W. Bush administration manipulated intelligence to take the country to war with Iraq—and later meticulously detailed for his readers after the war was over how the White House had done so.

Summarizing those stories, The Washington Post online White House columnist Dan Froomkin, wrote on March 31, 2006, wrote that Waas' articles presented a "compelling narrative about how President Bush and his top aides contrived their bogus case for war in Iraq."

== Valerie Plame and the special counsel's investigation ==
While writing numerous stories about the second Bush administration's policies that led up to war with Iraq, Waas simultaneously wrote about the investigation of CIA leak prosecutor Patrick J. Fitzgerald's investigation as to who leaked covert CIA operative Valerie Plame's identity to the press—illustrating in his reporting how the two stories were inextricably linked in that the effort to damage Plame was part of a broader Bush White House effort to discredit those who were alleging that it had misrepresented intelligence information to make the case to go to war.

Plame's identity as a covert CIA agent was leaked to the media by senior Bush White House officials to discredit and retaliate against her husband, former Ambassador Joseph C. Wilson IV, who had alleged the Bush administration misrepresented intelligence information to make the case to go to war with Saddam Hussein. I. Lewis (Scooter) Libby, the chief of staff to Vice President Dick Cheney, was later convicted on federal charges of perjury and obstruction of justice in an attempt to conceal his own role and that of others in the Bush White House in outing Plame, although President Bush would later commute Libby's thirty-month prison sentence. (President Bush's then chief political adviser, Karl Rove, was investigated by the special prosecutor, Patrick Fitzgerald, as well, but not charged.) Waas not only wrote the first story disclosing that it was Libby who had leaked Plame's identity to New York Times reporter Judith Miller, but the same story also paved the way for Miller, then in jail for more than a hundred days, for refusing to identify Libby as his source, to be released and testify against Libby.

In an August 6, 2005 story in the American Prospect, Waas first disclosed that it was Libby who had first provided Plame's name to Miller.

That same story also disclosed that Libby was encouraging Miller to stay in jail and not reveal that Libby was her source. After reading Waas' story, prosecutor Fitzgerald wrote a letter to Libby's attorney, citing Waas' reporting, demanding that Libby encourage Miller to finally testify. Fitzgerald wrote in the letter that "Libby had simply decided that encouraging Ms. Miller to testify was not in his best interest", that Libby discouraging Miller to testify so as to thwart the special counsel's investigation might be possibly construed as an obstruction of justice or witness tampering. As a result, Libby then wrote and called Miller saying that it was alright for her to testify. After spending more than a hundred days in jail, Miller was released, whereupon she provided testimony and evidence to prosecutors against Libby, directly leading to Libby's indictment, and subsequent conviction, on multiple federal criminal charges of obstruction of justice and perjury. Washington Post media columnist Howard Kurtz wrote on April 17, 2006, that Waas' account "set in motion the waiver springing Miller from jail on contempt charges."

Regarding these same stories on the Plame case, as well as his earlier stories on the misrepresentation of intelligence information by the Bush administration to take the U.S. to war with Iraq, New York University journalism professor and press critic Jay Rosen wrote that Waas had the promise to be his generation's ""new Bob Woodward": Rosen wrote that the most significant story of that time was how Bush and top aides had "deceptively drove the nation to war." Rosen had concluded that Waas had emerged as the leading reporter on that story.

Several of Waas's later published accounts of that aspect of the Plame affair informed his Union Square Press book on the Libby trial published in June 2007, which he discusses in some detail in his interview with Amy Goodman on Democracy Now!.

== Trump era reporting ==
During the Trump administration, Waas was one of the first reporters to write about efforts by the National Enquirer, its parent company, American Media, Inc., and President Trump's then-personal attorney and fixer, Michael Cohen, to pay hush money to women with whom Trump had extramarital affairs.

On November 20, The New York Times, citing Waas' original reporting, published it own story reporting that its own sources had independently confirmed that Trump had pressured Whitaker and senior Justice Department officials to investigate Hillary Clinton. The Times story, however, went even further, disclosing that Trump ordered his then-White House Counsel, Don McGahn, to prosecute Hillary Clinton and James Comey, even if there was no real evidence that either did anything wrong. McGahn was so distressed by Trump's demands, The Times reported, that the White House Counsel warned the president in a memo that Trump might face "possible impeachment" if he persisted with such efforts.

Based on the disclosures by the Vox and The New York Times reports, Senate Majority Leader, Charles Schumer, Democrat of New York, requested that the Justice Department's Inspector General investigate Whitaker's conduct. Schumer in particular asked the Inspector General to investigate allegations "by veteran journalist Murray Waas [in Vox, which] revealed that Whitaker.. was counseling the White House on how the president might pressure Sessions and Deputy Attorney General Rod Rosenstein to direct the Justice Department to investigate Trump's enemies." Schumer also asked the Justice Department in his letter to investigate whether, Whitaker, while Acting Attorney General "may have shared with the White House... confidential grand jury or investigative information from the Special Counsel investigation."

== Other reporting ==
In an interview about his work, on May 15, 2006, with Elizabeth Halloran, of U.S. News & World Report, when she asked whether he was "working on stories other than those involving the Fitzgerald investigation," Waas indicated that he has "been working on a long, explanatory piece about healthcare issues, the cervical cancer vaccine." Among the questions that he raised with Halloran are: "Why isn't that vaccine going to get to the people it should get to? Is it going to be locked away?"

Asked during the same interview by Halloran why Waas had chosen not only not to appear on cable television shows, but had also been known to decline to go on such shows as Nightline and Meet the Press, he responded: "There's not much of it that really enlightens us. There are journalists who don't do journalism anymore. They go on television; they're blogging; they're giving speeches; they're going to parties. And then at the end of the week they've had four or five hours devoted to journalism."

Waas further explained:

An acquaintance of mine, [Doonesbury cartoonist] Garry Trudeau, went a long time without going on TV, and we talked about having a 12-step program for people who appear on television too much. It would be a boom business in Washington. But Garry has lapses – he's been on Nightline, Charlie Rose. I also believe he did a morning show one time. But I've been steadfast. I have not been broken. I thought it was me and Garry against the world, the two amigos. He's left me hanging out there.

Waas similarly told Washington Post media writer Howard Kurtz, who had nicknamed Waas "The Lone Ranger": "If my journalism has had impact, it has been because I have spent more time in county courthouses than greenrooms," Claude Lewis, a member of the editorial board of The Philadelphia Inquirer wrote in a profile of the journalist that his low-key approach had proved to be effective: "His quiet and sometimes unorthodox manner is disarming... But he is an intelligent and intense digger, who checks and double-checks his facts.", Lewis wrote.

== Book publication ==
The United States v. I. Lewis Libby, edited and with reporting by Waas, was published by Sterling Publishing's Union Square Press imprint on June 5, 2007.

The bulk of the book was an edited version of the trial transcript of the federal criminal trial of I. Lewis Libby, culled from its original size of nearly a million words. The book also included an original essay written by Waas, entitled "The Last Compartment", which contained new information and reporting.

The book's editor and publisher told USA Today that the book was an attempt to be "like the published reports from the 9/11 Commission and the Iraq Study Group" in both thoroughness and accuracy, providing additional context to the original documentary record, and adding new reporting and information.

Reviewing the book in the Columbia Journalism Review, James Boylan, a contributing editor of the magazine, wrote for its November/December 2007 issue, wrote that Waas shed light on not only on the Plame affair, but also the "foibles of a cohort of Washington's current insider journalists" whose mistakes helped cause the scandal.

== Assessments of Waas's journalism ==
Waas's reporting on the administration of George W. Bush—especially with regard to the Bush administration's misrepresentation of intelligence to take the nation to war, and the Plame affair— has been called "groundbreaking" by New York University journalism Professor and press critic Jay Rosen, who further wrote that he was anointing Waas as the "new Bob Woodward".

While praising Waas, Rosen severely criticized Woodward for allegedly having been co-opted by the Bush White House into believing that Iraq had weapons of mass destruction, when it in fact had none, thus propagating administration lies to take the nation to war. Rosen also sharply criticized Woodward for not telling the truth about his role in the Plame affair, when Woodward concealed from his readers and editors that Plame's identity had been leaked to him by senior Bush administration officials to discredit her opposition to the U.S. invasion of Iraq: "Not only is Woodward not in the hunt," Rosen wrote, "but he is slowly turning into the hunted. Part of what remains to be uncovered is how Woodward was played by the Bush team, and what they thought they were doing by leaking to him, as well as what he did with the dubious information he got."

Rosen wrote that Waas had supplanted Woodward as the leading reporter of what Woodward had done earlier in his career by "finding, tracking, breaking into reportable parts--and then publishing--the biggest story in town." Rosen added: "Today the biggest story in town is what really went down as the Bush team drove deceptively to war, and later tried to conceal how bad the deception--and decision-making--had been."

Regarding those same stories, The Washington Post online White House columnist Dan Froomkin, assessed in a March 31, 2006, that Waas' articles presented a "compelling narrative about how President Bush and his top aides contrived their bogus case for war in Iraq," and had successfully succeeded in having the public believe it to be true. Froomkin wrote that Waas demonstrated that the Bush administration accomplished this by having "selectively leaked or declassified secret intelligence findings that served their political agenda -- while aggressively asserting the need to keep secret the information" that would contradict their misleading claims, and by silencing dissenters.

In November 2005, Hendrick Hertzberg, then the executive editor of The New Yorker, wrote that Waas' reporting was crucial to demonstrating that it was untrue that President Bush and his administration "were themselves misinformed", rather than having purposefully "lied", while falsely claiming that Saddam Hussein had weapons of mass destruction, in making the case to the American people to go to war with Iraq. Hertzberg cited one consequential story by Waas, which disclosed that only ten days after the September 11, 2001 terror attacks, Bush had been personally informed in a "highly classified briefing that the U.S. intelligence community had no evidence linking the Iraqi regime of Saddam Hussein to the attacks and that there was scant credible evidence that Iraq had any significant collaborative ties with Al Qaeda"—despite repeated claims by Bush and many of his administration's most senior officials to the contrary. Hertzberg noted that Waas had further reported that the same intelligence information "was not shared with Congress before the war" and then likewise similarly withheld later from the various "commissions and senatorial committees" which investigated how the U.S. had come to go to war with Iraq. Hertzberg argued that this was strong evidence that Bush and his aides were lying when denying they had never had lied in the first place. He noted that while most Americans initially believed that Bush had not purposely lied, some fifty-seven per cent of those later surveyed in an NBC-Wall Street Journal poll come to then believe that “President Bush [had] deliberately misled people to make the case for war with Iraq.” The end result, Hertzberg wrote, was a "war of occupation— dubious in origin, incompetent in execution, opaque but ominous."

On October 27, 1992, the late David Shaw, then a staff writer for the Los Angeles Times who won a Pulitzer Prize for Criticism the previous year, assessed the reporting by his colleagues Murray Waas and Douglas Frantz on the first Bush administration's prewar policy towards Iraq leading up to the first Gulf War, noted that the reporters wrote more than 100 stores on the subject—about half appearing on the newspaper's front page—based on thousands of pages of highly classified government papers.

Shaw wrote that their stories illustrated how the George H.W. Bush administration's provision of "billions of dollars worth of loan guarantees and military technology to Saddam Hussein" helped pay for, and supply, the sophisticated and deadly weapons which Saddam later "used against American and allied forces in the Persian Gulf War."

Media critic Russ Baker praised the same reporting in the Columbia Journalism Review,. observing that the reporters' stories were "admirably, light on anonymous sources and heavy on information from [classified] documents."

Baker further pointed out that Waas had earlier been one of only a handful of reporters who had written about the covert Reagan and Bush administrations' covert foreign policies leading up to hostilities with Iraq, prior to the war itself. Baker noted that the Village Voice on Dec. 18, 1990 "published a major investigation" by Waas demonstrating that George Bush had been a major behind-the-scenes advocate of a pro-Iraq tilt, during and after the Iran-Iraq war.

During the presidential administration of William Jefferson Clinton, Waas wrote some of the first investigative stories critical of Whitewater Independent Counsel Kenneth Starr. Several conservative media outlets, among them, the now defunct Weekly Standard and the editorial pages of the Wall Street Journal, as well as the late conservative syndicated columnist, Robert Novak, harshly criticized his reporting of both Starr's investigation and the resulting impeachment saga. The Journal's editorial page disparaged his stories for primarily appearing in "an Internet magazine called Salon (paid circulation zip)." Washington Post media critic Howard Kurtz wrote, however, that "what has infuriated the president's detractors is that Waas... and his colleagues [were] starting to draw blood." Kurtz noted that on the basis of Waas' reporting, the Justice Department had sought an investigation of Starr's most important witnesses against the president. And Kurtz further pointed out that several of Waas' stories had been picked up both The New York Times. and The Washington Post", and found nothing inaccurate in his stories. Also, in sharp contrast, media critics writing for the Online Journalism Review, the American Journalism Review, the Columbia Journalism Review, and The Washington Post, praised the very same reporting. In The Washington Post, columnist John Schwartz wrote that reporting by Waas and his colleagues had "yielded amazing things."

In June 1998, J.D. Lasica published "The Web: A New Channel for Investigative Journalism", a "sidebar" to his article entitled "Salon: The Best Pure-Play Web Publication?", published in American Journalism Review, assessing reporting on the Impeachment of Bill Clinton in Salon.com by Waas and his colleagues. "For some time now," Lasica wrote, "the mainstream media have taken shots at the Internet for allowing anyone to spread rumors, lies and conspiracy theories to a global audience of millions." Waas' reporting, Lasica wrote, had reversed that trend, demonstrating for perhaps the first time that online journalism had the potential to become an "alternative channel for original investigative journalism" and set the record straight about incorrect or misplaced reporting by mainstream news organizations. More broadly, Lasica further opined further that "Salon's coverage of the Clinton-Lewinsky matter— was perhaps the "first sustained foray into classic investigative journalism" by an Internet publication and "served as a counterweight" to the mainstream media's "wolfpack mindset."

Andrew Ross, (then-managing editor of Salon) said that he believed "Salon's investigative journalism ... has raised old media's hackles because "it was done the old-fashioned way: shoe leather, cultivating sources, working the phones—no new-media tricks here." Indeed, Ross noted that Waas himself was [at that time] "a bit of a technophobe" who had not previously gone online much. Waas said that he wrote for Salon because 'I like the daily rhythm and the immediacy.'" David Weir, a co-founder of the Center for Investigative Reporting and journalism professor at the University of California at Berkeley, said that the reporting of Waas and his colleagues represented a "breakthrough" for a news site only publishing on the Web: "This was the first time we’ve seen an Internet news organization dig out an important national story that the rest of the media missed."

Waas was the winner in 1998 of the Society of Professional Journalists Award for Depth Reporting for his coverage of Whitewater and the impeachment crisis.

In the Online Journalism Review, Matt Welch also praised the "web-only journalism' produced by Waas. pointing out that as a result of his reporting, "Kenneth Starr's key Whitewater witness David Hale has suffered a serious blow to his credibility, and the independent counsel himself has been forced to fend off conflict-of-interest questions from the Justice Department."

On April 17, 2006, then-Washington Post media critic Howard Kurtz, published a profile of Waas describing him a serious, if not elusive, journalist. Despite Waas having "racked up a series of scoops" for over a quarter-century, Kurtz wrote, the reporter preferred to remain in the "journalistic shadows" and wasn't apt to "toot his own horn." Waas initially refused to be interviewed for his profile of the reporter, Kurtz wrote.

Waas explained to Kurtz that while many reporters were only pursuing stories "to get "television appearances or million-dollar book contracts, it is difficult for us to play our proper role... My theory is, avoid the limelight, do what's important and leave your mark. . . . If my journalism has had impact, it has been because I have spent more time in county courthouses than greenrooms."

In the summer of 2006, writing in Nieman Reports, Jim Boyd, former deputy editorial page editor of the Minneapolis Star-Tribune for twenty-four years, prepared an "exclusive list" of newspaper reporters whom he considered "courageous," including among them, Waas, Dan Froomkin and Dana Priest of The Washington Post, and Helen Thomas of the Associated Press: "I’m not talking about physical courage, which many good journalists display daily in Iraq and other dangerous places," Boyd wrote, "I’m talking mental toughness, willingness to risk. We have... [too] few I.F. Stones, David Halberstams and Neil Sheehans [today]."

In July 2007, GQ Magazine named Waas as one of four of "The Best Reporters You Don't Know About," praising his "years of groundbreaking watchdog journalism." The magazine cited his pieces on the Plame leak investigation and the firings of U.S. attorneys by the Bush administration as examples of notable work.

In 2009, Eric Alterman and Danielle Ivory, wrote for the website of the Center for American Progress that it was becoming "increasingly evident every day... [that] Internet-based reporters are increasingly setting priorities for the national news agenda". citing as a primary example Waas' role in "unearthing the truth about the outing of Valerie Plame." (Waas primarily broke his stories on the Plame affair on the websites of National Journal and the American Prospect, and earlier on his personal blog, when there was scant interest by the Washington establishment in the story.)

Twice in 2010, Ryan Chittum of the Columbia Journalism Review wrote two columns praising Waas' investigations of the U.S. health insurance industry. On March 17, 2010, Chittum wrote that Waas had conducted an "eye-opening investigation" demonstrating that, Assurant a major health-insurance company, had systematically targeted patients with costly and life-threatening health issues on the flimsiest of pretexts so they would no longer have to pay for their expensive care. On April 22, 2010, Chittum again praised Reuters and Waas for publishing a story documenting how Wellpoint, the nation's largest health insure, had "systematically targeted customers with breast cancer" to find excuses to drop their coverage.

On March 17. and March 19, 2010, New York Times columnist Paul Krugman, wrote that an "investigative report" by Waas in Reuters "powerfully illustrates the vileness of our current [health care] system," in the process serving as a persuasive and powerful argument as to why Senators should vote for health care reform, (which later became known as "Obamacare")-- only days before the historic vote making it law. Krugman wrote that Waas' story demonstrated that we then had in place "a system that creates huge incentives for bad, one might say demonic, behavior" by the health insurance industry."

In 2018, the editors of the New York Review of Books, praised Waas' reporting on special counsel Robert Mueller's investigation of then-president Donald Trump, and Trump's attempted politicization of the Justice Department, saying that Waas "schooled us in how long-form investigative reporting should be done."

== Investigation of the U.S. health insurance industry ==
On March 17, 2010, only days before the historic vote in the United States House of Representatives enacting the Affordable Care Act (commonly known as the ACA or "Obamacare") into law, Reuters published a story, based on a months long investigation by Waas, detailing how one of the nation's largest insurance companies, Assurant, had a policy of targeting all of it policyholders recently diagnosed with HIV for cancelation. The story asserted that the company utilized an algorithm which "searched for any pretext to revoke their policy" based on "the flimsiest of evidence."

The Obama administration and members of Congress cited the report as a reason health care reform was so needed. In a column appearing only a few nights before the vote, following up on his own earlier blog post on the same subject from two days earlier, New York Times columnist Paul Krugman wrote that the actions of Assurant were representative of the "vileness of our current system" and illustrated why reform was necessary.

Shortly after the passage of the health reform bill, Reuters followed up, with another story by Waas on April 23, 2010, disclosing that WellPoint, the nation's largest health insurance company, had similarly targeted policyholders with breast cancer, shortly after their diagnoses. The Reuters story asserted that WellPoint had employed a computer algorithm that specifically targeted all of their policyholders recently diagnosed with breast cancer, to search for any pretext whatsoever, to cancel their insurance, when they needed it the most.

An earlier investigation by the House Energy and Commerce Committee had determined that just three health insurers—WellPoint (now Anthem), Assurant, and UnitedHealth Group—had made at least $300 million by improperly rescinding more than 19,000 policyholders with life-threatening, but costly illnesses, over one five-year period alone."

A Wellpoint executive testified before the committee that the company only engaged in rescission, a practice also known as post claims underwriting, as a means of "stopping fraud and material misrepresentation that contributes to spiraling health care costs." But as Waas reported in his story, federal and state regulators could find virtually no instances in which a patient's policy has been legitimately canceled.

Waas pointed out that in 2007, the California Department of Managed Health Care had randomly examined 90 cases in which Anthem Blue Cross of California had canceled the health insurance policies of customers recently diagnosed with cancer or other life-threatening health conditions to see how many were legally justified. None were. The DMCH's study concluded: “In all 90 files, there was no evidence (that Blue Cross), before rescinding coverage, investigated or established that the applicant’s omission/misrepresentation was willful."

The Waas story garnered immediate attention. Published not only on Reuters' website, one of the nation's most highly trafficked news sites, it also appeared on seven other of the ten most highly read news sites—those of The New York Times, The Washington Post, Yahoo News, ABC News, NBC News, MSNBC, and The Huffington Post. The story was ubiquitous online, appearing on dozens of dozens of other news sites as well, reaching millions of readers.

On April 23, 2010, Secretary of Health and Human Services Kathleen Sebelius wrote Wellpoint's CEO, Angela Braly, to say that Wellpoint's actions were "deplorable" and "unconscionable," and called on the company to "immediately cease these practices." Speaker of the U.S. House of Representatives Nancy Pelosi weighed in as well after reading the story, saying: "Americans who are fighting for their lives should not have to fight for their health insurance."

As a result of both the strong public reaction to the story as well as intense pressure from the Obama administration, WellPoint agreed to voluntarily end such practices only a week after Waas' story appeared. The nation's other largest health insurance companies followed suit only days later.

President Obama, whose late mother had problems and disagreements with her own insurance carrier before she died from ovarian cancer, followed up on May 8, 2010, by severely criticizing WellPoint for the practice in his weekly radio address, noting that the health insurer had been caught “systematically dropping the coverage of women diagnosed with breast cancer.” Pointing out that Wellpoint and the rest of the health insurance industry had now agreed to end the practice, Obama triumphantly declared: “For too long, we have been held hostage to an insurance industry that jacks up premiums and drops coverage as they please. But those days are finally coming to an end."

Praising the reform, The New York Times editorial page noted in a May 2, 2010 editorial that the insurance companies had rushed to act "after they were whacked by some very bad publicity"—namely "an investigative report by Reuters."

Waas later won the Barlett & Steele Award for Business Investigative Reporting from the Walter Cronkite School at Arizona State University for his stories on WellPoint and other health insurance companies. He also won a second award by the Society of American Business Editors and Writers (SABEW) in the category of investigative reporting for reporting the same stories.

== See also ==
- Iran-Contra affair
- Kenneth Starr
- Watchdog journalism
