= Viveca Novak =

American journalist

Viveca Novak is an American journalist who has worked as the editorial and communications director at OpenSecrets since 2011. She was previously a Washington correspondent for Time and The Wall Street Journal. She is a frequent guest on CNN, NBC, PBS, and Fox.

Time announced in its issue of December 5, 2005, that Novak was cooperating with Special Counsel Patrick Fitzgerald's investigation of the Valerie Plame leak. She is not related to Robert Novak, another journalist involved in the incident.

== Role in the Valerie Plame Scandal ==
On December 2, 2005, The New York Times reported that Karl Rove's lawyer, Robert Luskin, learned from Novak that one of her colleagues at Time, Matthew Cooper, had interviewed Rove about Plame. Her conversation with Luskin may have set in motion events that caused Rove to change his earlier grand jury testimony. Special prosecutor Patrick Fitzgerald did not seek perjury charges against Rove, possibly because it was unclear whether or not Rove intended to testify falsely the first time. Rove attributed his changed testimony to faulty memory. Novak wrote her own account of the experience in Time.

== Education and awards ==
=== Education ===
- B.A. in Foreign Affairs from University of Virginia
- M.S. from Columbia University Graduate School of Journalism
- M.S.L from Yale Law School

=== Awards ===
- Sigma Delta Chi Award, public service in online journalism
- Harvard University's Goldsmith Prize for investigative reporting
- Clarion Award for investigative reporting
- Investigative Reporters and Editors Award

== Bibliography ==
- Inside the Wire: A Military Intelligence Soldier's Eyewitness Account of Life at Guantanamo, co-authored with Erik Saar, 2005 (ISBN 1-59420-066-1)
