= Adam Levine (press aide) =

American political adviser and White House deputy press secretary

Adam Levine (born January 15, 1969) is an American former political adviser who was a White House deputy press secretary in President George W. Bush's administration from January 2002 to December 2003. In the CIA leak investigation, Levine testified before the federal grand jury in February 2004 and October 2005.

== Career ==
=== Political aide ===
Early in his career, Levine was a top aide to former U. S. Senator Daniel Patrick Moynihan, Democrat from New York. In 2001, Levine joined the communications team of United States President George W. Bush. Levine's main responsibility was to act as the "liaison between the White House and television networks."

=== Television ===
A former senior producer for NBC News, at one time Levine was senior producer in charge of Hardball with Chris Matthews.

== CIA leak investigation ==
Levine was one of the first people to testify for the grand jury investigating the Plame scandal. Levine's testimony addressed his knowledge of White House procedures, in particular phone calls with reporters and a conversation he had with Karl Rove on July 11, 2003. He testified again in October 2005, making him one of the last witnesses to speak to prosecutors before Patrick Fitzgerald decided not to indict Rove. Levine's testimony to prosecution investigators indicated that the Plame affair was not a priority for Rove at the time and therefore easily forgotten by Rove.

== See also ==
- CIA leak grand jury investigation
- Plame Affair
- White House Press Secretary

== Notes and sources ==
- Ex-White House press aide questioned in CIA leak Dana Bash CNN Washington Bureau February 10, 2004
- Four White House Aides Testify on CIA Name Leak Fox News Wednesday, February 11, 2004
