= Erik Saar =

A United States Army enlisted intelligence soldier, Sergeant Erik R. Saar was the co-author of the 2005 Inside the Wire: A Military Intelligence Soldier's Eyewitness Account of Life at Guantanamo, together with Viveca Novak.

He had worked as an Arabic translator for six months from December 2002 to June 2003 at the Guantanamo Bay detainment camps which he later described as a "dysfunctional facility where prisoner abuse was all but inevitable". He described faked interrogations, sexual interrogation techniques and physical assaults of prisoners.
