= Israel Hernandez =

American presidential advisor

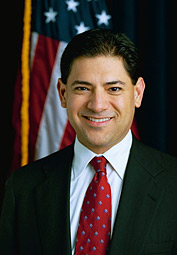
Israel Hernandez

Israel Hernández served as the Assistant Secretary of Commerce for International Trade and Promotion and Director-General of the United States Commercial Service under President George W. Bush. He was confirmed by the U.S. Senate on October 3, 2005. This U.S. government agency is a global trade office with presence in more than 47 states and 80 countries to protect and advance U.S. trade interests abroad and provides international business advocacy assistance at the federal, state and local level. In January 2009, Hernandez was appointed to the President's Advisory Committee for Trade Policy and Negotiations (ACTPN) for a five-year term at the United States Trade Representative's Office in the Executive Office of the President.

== History ==
Israel Hernández graduated from the University of Texas at Austin with a double major in Philosophy and Political Science in 1992; he worked as an intern for Governor Bill Clements during this time. In 1993 he became the travel aide for gubernatorial candidate George W. Bush. Hernandez remained in that role through the 1994 election. He later earned a M.P.A. from The Bush School of Government and Public Service in public policy with an emphasis in business at Texas A&M University in 1999. In 2009, Mr. Hernandez was awarded the prestigious Outstanding Young Texas Ex Alumni Award from his alma mater.

Hernandez worked for President Bush in the Office of Strategy as Director of Voter Contact in the Bush-Cheney 2000 presidential campaign. He also served in Bush's campaign for and first term as Governor of Texas.

Hernandez first joined the Commerce Department as Senior Advisor to the Secretary of Commerce, Carlos Gutierrez helping on public policy, international trade and investment issues. Before joining the Department of Commerce, Hernandez worked in the White House from 2001–2005. He was the Deputy Assistant to President George W. Bush in the Office of Strategic Initiatives and served as a deputy to then-Senior Advisor and former Deputy Chief of Staff, Mr. Karl Rove. During the Bush-Cheney 2004 presidential campaign, Hernandez served as the liaison between the White House and the Bush-Cheney campaign.

Hernández testified before the CIA leak grand jury investigation in July 2005.

Hernández is openly gay.

In 2013, Hernández was a signatory to an amicus curiae brief submitted to the Supreme Court in support of same-sex marriage during the Hollingsworth v. Perry case.

== See also ==
- Plame affair
