= Bill Harlow =

American historian

Bill Harlow (born May 30, 1950) is a retired U.S. Navy captain, author, and public relations specialist. He was the top spokesperson for the Central Intelligence Agency (CIA) and worked in the White House dealing with national security media issues.

== Publications ==
=== Circle William ===
Circle William is a novel about two brothers. One brother, Jim, is the White House press secretary and his younger brother, Bill, is the captain of the USS Winston Churchill. When the United States government learns of Libya's plan to drop chemical weapons on the Knesset in Jerusalem, Israel, they must work together. Their first step is to prepare for a chemical, nuclear, or germ attack otherwise known as to set a "Circle William." What complicates their mission is Sue O'Dell, a journalist at the Washington Post, who plans to write a feature on Bill.

=== Hard Measures: How Aggressive CIA Actions After 9/11 Saved American Lives ===
Harlow co-authored the book with Jose A. Rodriguez, Jr, a former CIA undercover officer before he joined the CIA Counterterrorism Mission Center. The book goes in-depth into Rodriquez's experience. The authors claim that aggressive measures like enhanced interrogation saved American lives after the September 11th attacks

=== At the Center of the Storm: My Years at the CIA ===
Harlow co-authored the book with George Tenet. It is the narration of Tenet's time at the CIA, particularly the time surrounding the September 11th attacks. According to the authors, the book demonstrates the CIA's attempts to prepare the U.S. for numerous threats, understand the events which led to 9/11 as well as explain and offer information led to the iniation of the 2003 invasion of Iraq. Tenet and Harlow offer their interpretations on President George W. Bush's "sixteen words" in his 2003 State of the Union Address and Tenet's true context of his "slam dunk" comment.

=== The Great War of Our Time: The CIA's Fight Against Terrorism: From al Qa'ida to ISIS ===
Harlow co-authored the book with Michael Morell, a former acting director and deputy director of the CIA.

== After military service ==
Harlow retired from the Navy with the rank of captain in 1997. He became the chief of public affairs for the CIA. Additionally, Harlow has been the Navy's deputy spokesperson in Europe, special assistant to the Secretary of the Navy, and as an assistant White House press secretary for national security and foreign affairs.

== Personal life ==
Harlow's parents are both U.S. Navy veterans and he lives in northern Virginia.
