= Robert Luskin =

American lawyer

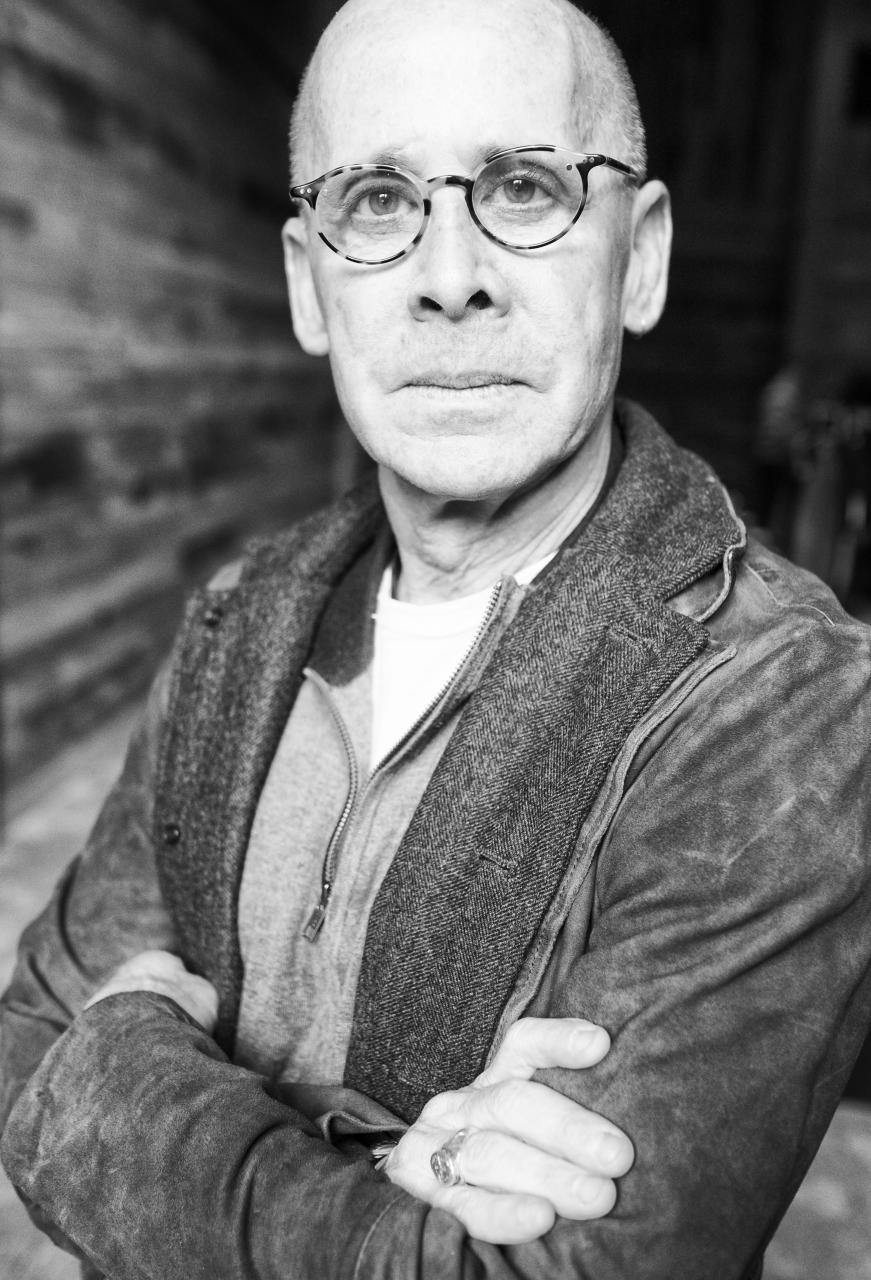
Robert Luskin photographed by Christopher Michel in 2014

Robert D. Luskin (born January 21, 1950) is an attorney and partner in the Washington office of the international law firm of Paul Hastings, LLP specializing in White-collar crime and federal and state government investigations.

== Practice ==
Robert Luskin currently specializes in complex criminal and civil litigation at both the trial and appellate levels. Over the course of his career, he has represented foreign corporations, financial institutions, White House officials, cabinet secretaries, federal judges and members of Congress.

In 1995, Luskin successfully represented a sitting federal judge in a criminal appeal to the Supreme Court, resulting in a landmark case narrowing the construction of the general perjury statute.

In 2004, Luskin successfully represented the Assessor for Orange County, California in a Constitutional tax case involving $5–8 billion.

In 2003–09, Luskin represented White House senior advisor and chief political strategist Karl Rove, representing Rove in the special investigations into the outing of covert operative Valerie Plame's position within the Central Intelligence Agency (CIA) as a weapons of mass destruction (WMD) specialist.

Luskin was lead counsel for Lance Armstrong after the June 2012 allegations of blood doping by the US Anti-Doping Agency, a quasi-official American sports governing entity.

In 2019, Luskin represented Gordon Sondland, U.S. Ambassador to the EU, in the first impeachment proceedings involving Donald Trump. Luskin was the subject of a front-page profile in the New York Times following Sondland's appearance in public testimony.

Since 2012, Luskin has focused on civil and criminal investigations under the Foreign Corrupt Practices Act, and has represented foreign corporations in several of the largest FCPA investigations ever resolved by the DOJ and SEC:, including multi-jurisdictional resolutions on behalf of Airbus, Goldman Sachs, Total, Alstom, SBM Offshore and Technip.

Luskin has won significant recognition for his efforts, and has been hailed as a “dean of the FCPA bar” by Chambers USA. In 2021, Luskin was recognized as “White Collar Lawyer of the Year” by Chambers USA and was named a “White Collar MVP” by Law360 in addition to having spent the better part of the last decade atop the Chambers USA rankings in his areas of practice. The Global Investigations Review has identified Bob as one of 20 elite practitioners worldwide in the area of anti-corruption and recently also recognized Luskin as a “Global Thought Leader.”

Pulitzer Prize-winning journalist James B. Stewart singled out Luskin as a lawyer who, unlike most criminal lawyers, was prepared to be candid with prosecutors, not permit his client to lie, and come forward with information. Stewart wrote further: "These cases also illustrate that criminal defense lawyers have much to answer for. To his credit, Rove's lawyer Robert Luskin promptly revealed a damaging e-mail and had Rove amend his earlier testimiony that he didn't speak to Time's Matt Cooper. But other defense lawyers allowed their clients to lie in circumstances where they knew or should have known they were doing so."

== Fee Forfeiture ==
In 1997, US Attorney Sheldon Whitehouse of Rhode Island accused Luskin of "willful blindness" for accepting $505,125 in gold bars as well as Swiss Wire transfers of $169,000 from Stephen Saccoccia, after Luskin represented Saccoccia post-conviction. Whitehouse argued that Saccoccia's payments to Luskin were related to Saccoccia's broad money-laundering scheme and that the money should be returned to the government. The Court of Appeals for the First Circuit considered Whitehouse's forfeiture claims in two separate opinions and both times ruled that there was no basis to seek forfeitures from Saccoccia's attorneys.

William Moffitt, VP of the National Association of Defense Lawyers, supported Luskin: "if the case gets a high profile [or] they don't like the lawyer in it, they can immediately open this kind of assault," adding "if you plead your client guilty, they're never going to go after your fee. So there's an incentive here to give the government what it wants."

In 1998, Luskin settled with the government, forfeiting $245,000 in fees.

== Personal life ==
Despite representing President Bush's top political advisor Karl Rove, EU Ambassador Sondland, and other senior Republican officials, Luskin is a Democrat and has donated to numerous Democratic causes. A Washington Post profile in 2011 described him as a "man of somewhat Neiman-Marxist tastes".

Luskin is married and has two sons and two step daughters.

== See also ==
- Plame affair
- RICO
- FCPA
