= Patrick Fitzgerald =

American lawyer

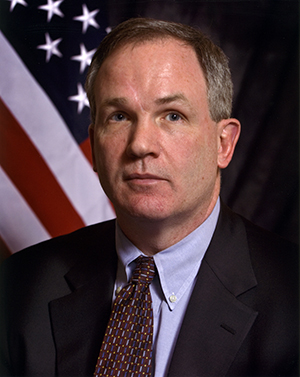
- Official portrait, 2012

United States Attorney for the Northern District of Illinois
- In office October 21, 2001 – June 30, 2012
- President: George W. Bush; Barack Obama
- Preceded by: Scott Lassar
- Succeeded by: Zachary T. Fardon

Special Counsel for the United States Department of Justice
- In office December 30, 2003 – March 6, 2007
- Appointed by: James Comey
- Preceded by: Position not in use
- Succeeded by: Position not in use

Personal details
- Born: December 22, 1960 (age 65) New York City, New York, U.S.
- Party: Independent
- Spouse: Jennifer Letzkus
- Children: 2
- Education: Amherst College (BA); Harvard University (JD)

Patrick J. Fitzgerald (born December 22, 1960) is an American attorney and former partner at the law firm of Skadden, Arps, Slate, Meagher & Flom.

For more than a decade, until June 30, 2012, Fitzgerald was the United States Attorney for the Northern District of Illinois. Prior to his appointment, he served as Assistant U.S. Attorney in the Southern District of New York from 1988 to 2001, and as Chief of the Organized Crime-Terrorism Unit since December 1995, where he participated in the prosecutions of Osama bin Laden, Omar Abdel-Rahman, and Ramzi Yousef.

As special counsel for the U.S. Department of Justice Office of Special Counsel, Fitzgerald was the federal prosecutor in charge of the investigation of the Valerie Plame affair, which led to the prosecution and conviction in 2007 of Vice President Dick Cheney's chief of staff Scooter Libby for perjury and obstruction of justice.

As a federal prosecutor, Fitzgerald led a number of high-profile investigations, including those that led to convictions of Illinois governors Rod Blagojevich and George Ryan, media mogul Conrad Black, several aides to Chicago mayor Richard M. Daley in the Hired Truck Program, and Chicago police detective and torturer Jon Burge.

== Personal ==
Fitzgerald was born in Brooklyn into a Roman Catholic family of Irish descent. His father (also named Patrick Fitzgerald) worked as a doorman in Manhattan and as a security guard at the 1964 New York World's Fair in Flushing, Queens. Fitzgerald attended Our Lady Help of Christians grammar school, before attending Regis High School. He received degrees in economics and mathematics from Amherst College, Phi Beta Kappa, before receiving his JD from Harvard Law School in 1985.

He played rugby at Amherst. At Harvard he was a member of the Harvard Business School Rugby Club.

Fitzgerald married Jennifer Letzkus in June 2008. They have two children.

== Career ==
=== New York ===
After practicing civil law, Fitzgerald became an Assistant United States Attorney in New York City in 1988. He handled drug trafficking cases and in 1993, assisted in the prosecution of Mafia figure John Gambino, a boss of the Gambino crime family. In 1994, Fitzgerald became the prosecutor in the case against Sheikh Omar Abdel Rahman and 11 others charged in the 1993 World Trade Center bombing.

In 1996, Fitzgerald became the National Security Coordinator for the Office of the U.S. Attorney for the Southern District of New York. There, he served on a team of prosecutors investigating Osama bin Laden. He also served as chief counsel in prosecutions related to the 1998 U.S. embassy bombings in Kenya and Tanzania.

=== Illinois ===
On September 1, 2001, Fitzgerald was nominated for the position of U.S. attorney for the Northern District of Illinois on the recommendation of U.S. Senator Peter Fitzgerald (no relation), a Republican from Illinois. On October 24, 2001, the nomination was confirmed by the Senate. The senator urged the selection because Patrick Fitzgerald is not from Chicago; Patrick said that he had visited Chicago only one day, for a wedding in 1982, before his selection.

Soon after becoming U.S. attorney for Northern Illinois, Fitzgerald began an investigation of political appointees of Republican Illinois Governor George Ryan, who were suspected of accepting bribes to give licenses to unqualified truck drivers. Fitzgerald soon expanded this investigation, uncovering a network of political bribery and gift-giving, and leading to more than 60 indictments. Ryan was indicted in December 2003. At the conclusion of the trial in April 2006, Ryan was found guilty on all eighteen counts against him. Ryan's co-defendant, Chicago businessman Larry Warner, then 67 years old, was convicted of racketeering conspiracy, fraud, attempted extortion, and money laundering. The two were sentenced on September 6, 2006: Ryan received a sentence of six and one half years, and Warner received a sentence of three years and five months.

Against criticism that these cases were based on circumstantial evidence, Fitzgerald responded: "People now know that if you're part of a corrupt conduct, where one hand is taking care of the other and contracts are going to people, you don't have to say the word 'bribe' out loud. And I think people need to understand we won't be afraid to take strong circumstantial cases into court."

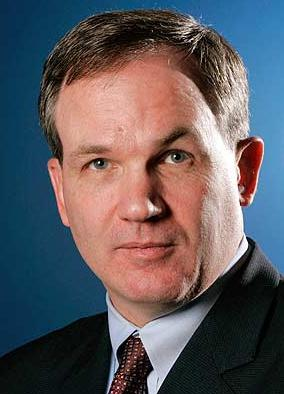
Fitzgerald - early official portrait

On July 18, 2005, his office indicted a number of top aides to Democrat Richard M. Daley, the mayor of Chicago, on charges of mail fraud, alleging numerous instances of corruption in hiring practices at City Hall.

In March 2006, former Chicago City Clerk James Laski pleaded guilty to pocketing nearly $50,000 in bribes for steering city business to two trucking companies. Laski was the highest-ranking Chicago official and Daley administration employee brought down by Fitzgerald's office in conjunction with the Hired Truck Program scandal. Beginning in April 2007, Fitzgerald oversaw Operation Crooked Code, the investigation and prosecution of more than two dozen defendants for bribery and related charges in Chicago's department of buildings and zoning.

On December 9, 2008, federal agents arrested Illinois Governor Rod Blagojevich for conspiring to profit from his authority to appoint President Barack Obama's successor to the U.S. Senate. Fitzgerald said Blagojevich "put a 'for sale' sign on the naming of a United States Senator".

Senator Peter Fitzgerald chose not to run for reelection in 2004, leaving Patrick Fitzgerald without a congressional patron. In the summer of 2005, there were rumors that he would not be reappointed to a second four-year term in retaliation for his investigations into corruption in Illinois and Chicago government, as well as for his investigation of the Plame scandal.

On May 23, 2012, Fitzgerald held a press conference informing the public that he was stepping down from his position and retiring as the U.S. Attorney for the Northern District of Illinois Federal Court effective June 30, 2012. Long-time prosecutor Gary S. Shapiro was named U.S. Attorney until a replacement was selected. He went into private practice of law and retired a decade later.

In 2013, Fitzgerald was appointed by Governor Patrick Quinn (Democrat) to the board of trustees for the University of Illinois.

=== Private practice ===
Fitzgerald joined Skadden, Arps, Slate, Meagher & Flom in the firm's Chicago office as a partner, in 2012. In June 2023, Fitzgerald retired from the firm.

== Notable cases ==
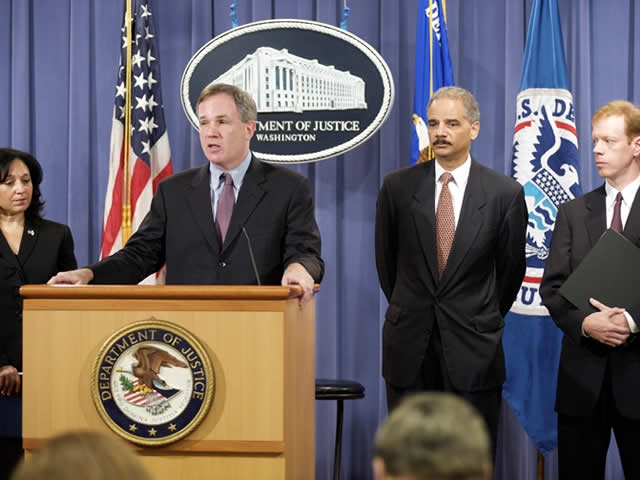
Fitzgerald announces drug trafficking charges at the Department of Justice in 2009.

=== Plame investigation ===
On December 30, 2003, due to conflicts of interest then-Attorney General John Ashcroft recused himself from the CIA leak grand jury investigation of the Plame affair. Deputy Attorney General James B. Comey, acting as Attorney General in Ashcroft's place, appointed Fitzgerald to the U.S. Department of Justice Office of Special Counsel in charge of the investigation. Fitzgerald was well-known to Comey and, at the time, was godfather to one of Comey's children.

On December 30, 2003, three months after the start of the Plame investigation, Fitzgerald was appointed Special Counsel. Through this, Fitzgerald was delegated "all the authority of the Attorney General" in the matter. In February 2004, Acting Attorney General Comey clarified the delegated authority and stated that Fitzgerald has plenary authority. Comey wrote "further, my conferral on you of the title of 'Special Counsel' in this matter should not be misunderstood to suggest that your position and authorities are defined and limited by 28 CFR Part 600".

On October 28, 2005, Fitzgerald brought an indictment for five counts of false statements, perjury, and obstruction of justice against Lewis "Scooter" Libby, U.S. Vice President Dick Cheney's Chief of Staff. Libby resigned to prepare for his legal defense. In his first press conference after announcing Libby's indictment, Fitzgerald was asked about comments by Republicans such as Kay Bailey Hutchison, who said "I certainly hope that if there is going to be an indictment that says something happened, that it is an indictment on a crime and not some perjury technicality", to which Fitzgerald responded, "That talking point won't fly. The truth is the engine of our judicial system. If you compromise the truth, the whole process is lost. If we were to walk away from this, we might as well hand in our jobs."

Robert Novak's testimony in Libby's perjury trial made it known that the two senior administration sources he cited in his article were Richard Armitage and Karl Rove. A month later Armitage claimed Fitzgerald had instructed him not to go public with this information. Journalist Michael Isikoff received confirmation from Rove's lawyer and from lobbyist Richard F. Hohlt that Rove was also faxed an advance copy of the article several days before it was published.

On March 6, 2007, Libby was convicted of 4 out of 5 charges of lying under oath. Fitzgerald announced on the courthouse steps that while he is always open to receiving new information related to the case, he expects to file no further charges, and the prosecutors would "return to their day jobs". Libby was sentenced to a $250,000 fine, 2 years of probation, and a 2½ year prison term. After a court of appeals rejected Libby's attempt to delay the prison sentence while he appealed the verdict, President George W. Bush commuted the prison portion of Libby's sentence, but did not commute the fine.

Two days after the verdict, Congressman Henry Waxman, chair of the U.S. House Committee on Government Reform, announced that his committee would ask Plame to testify on March 16, in an effort by his committee to look into "whether White House officials followed appropriate procedures for safeguarding Plame's identity". In March 2007, despite Fitzgerald's previous Attorney General's Award for Distinguished Service in 2002, Fitzgerald was ranked among prosecutors who "had not distinguished themselves" as opposed to "strong U.S. Attorneys who exhibited loyalty to the administration" on a Justice Department chart sent to the White House in March 2005. This was revealed in light of an investigation of the December 2006 firings of several U.S. Attorneys by Attorney General Alberto Gonzales, perceived as being politically motivated. Two other prosecutors so ranked were dismissed. On July 2, 2007, President Bush provided a statement on his decision to commute Libby's prison sentence and noted:

After the investigation was under way, the Justice Department appointed United States Attorney for the Northern District of Illinois Patrick Fitzgerald as a Special Counsel in charge of the case. Mr. Fitzgerald is a highly qualified, professional prosecutor who carried out his responsibilities as charged.

On April 13, 2018, Libby was pardoned by President Donald Trump.

=== Conrad Black and Hollinger ===
On November 17, 2005, Fitzgerald brought criminal fraud charges against former Canadian media mogul Conrad Black, as well as against three other Hollinger executives. The trial of Black began at the federal court in Chicago in March 2007. Black was convicted on July 13, 2007, and was later sentenced to serve 78 months in federal prison, pay Hollinger $6.1 million, and pay a fine of $125,000.

=== RISCISO Indictments ===
On February 1, 2006, the U.S. Attorney's Office under Fitzgerald announced that it was indicting nineteen members of Risciso, a software and movie piracy ring, in U.S. District Court in Chicago. The prosecution was the result of an undercover investigation, Operation Jolly Roger, that was part of Operation Site Down—an initiative by the FBI and law enforcement agents from ten other countries to disrupt and dismantle many of the leading warez groups that distribute and trade in copyrighted software, movies, music, and games on the Internet.

=== Blagojevich corruption arrest ===
On December 9, 2008, Fitzgerald confirmed in a press conference in Chicago that Illinois governor Rod Blagojevich and his chief of staff, John Harris, had been arrested by the FBI early that morning on charges of corruption. Fitzgerald described Blagojevich's actions as the "kind of conduct [that] would make Lincoln roll over in his grave". Blagojevich was charged with mail fraud and solicitation of a bribe. According to Fitzgerald, Blagojevich attempted to sell off President-elect Barack Obama's open U.S. Senate seat to the highest bidder, as well as pressuring the Chicago Tribune to fire editors critical of the Blagojevich administration in exchange for state assistance in selling Wrigley Field. Fitzgerald said at the news conference that, "I laid [sic] awake at night", worrying about the possible firing of Tribune editors.

=== Larry Nassar investigation ===
In 2014, Fitzgerald was hired by Michigan State University to conduct an internal investigation to discover whether and when university officials knew about sexual assault allegations against Dr. Larry Nassar. Fitzgerald reported to university officials that no MSU official "believed" that Nassar had committed sexual assault, but did not provide any written report detailing the evidence for this claim.

=== James Comey indictment ===
In 2025, Fitzgerald began serving as part of the defense counsel team for James Comey following his indictment on September 25, 2025, by a federal grand jury in Virginia on two charges that are related to his Congressional testimony in September 2020.

== See also ==
- Plame affair timeline – Chronology of the CIA leak scandal
- Rod Blagojevich federal corruption scandal – 2008 indictment of the then-Governor of Illinois Rod Blagojevich with corruption
- U.S. Department of Justice Office of Special Counsel – Former US government office

Legal offices
| Preceded by Scott Lassar | United States Attorney for the Northern District of Illinois; 2001–2012 | Succeeded by Zachary Fardon |
