= John P. Hannah =

American government administrator

- Hannah with Vice President Dick Cheney

National Security Advisor to the Vice President
- In office October 28, 2005 – January 20, 2009
- Vice President: Dick Cheney
- Preceded by: Scooter Libby
- Succeeded by: Antony Blinken

Personal details
- Born: John Peter Hannah; January 5, 1962 (age 64)
- Spouse: Laura
- Children: 2
- Education: Duke University; Yale Law School

John Peter Hannah (born January 5, 1962) is a senior counselor at Foundation for Defense of Democracies, and a senior advisor to Chairman Ron Wahid of Arcanum, a global strategic intelligence company and a subsidiary of Magellan Investment Holdings. He was formerly a senior fellow at the Washington Institute for Near East Policy, a Washington, DC think tank which was founded in 1985. He is also a former national security adviser to U.S. Vice President Dick Cheney from 2005 to 2009.

== Early life ==
Hannah's father was an oil executive working for Shell in the 1960s and 1970s. The Hannah family was stationed in Libya before Muammar Gaddafi came to power and nationalized the oil industry. They returned to the U.S. in the late 1970s and lived in Huntington, New York, for several years, before moving to Bahrain. Hannah graduated from Huntington High School in 1980., then went on to graduate from Duke University and Yale Law School.

== Career ==
On October 31, 2005, Cheney named Hannah as his assistant for national security affairs. At the same time, Cheney appointed another Duke alumnus, David S. Addington, as his chief of staff. The two took over duties that had previously been jointly held by I. Lewis "Scooter" Libby. Hannah had originally been on loan to the Office of the Vice President from the office of former State Department official and U.S. Ambassador to the United Nations John Bolton.

On February 11, 2007, The Washington Post reported that an unnamed ambassador present in a meeting with Hannah had been "taken aback" by a remark Hannah made that the Bush administration considered 2007 to be "the year of Iran," with Hannah indicating that he believed a U.S. attack on that country to be a real possibility.

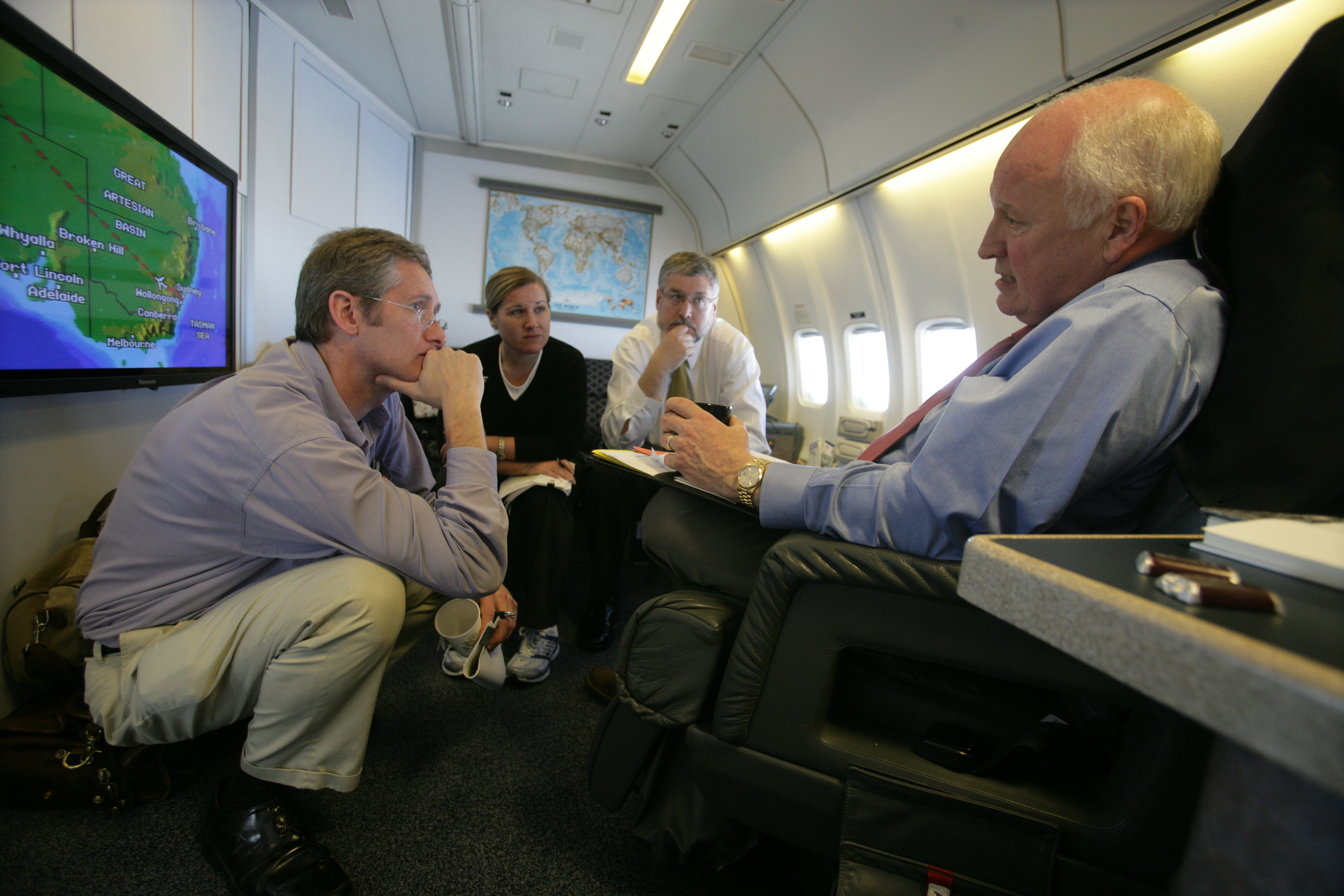
Vice President Cheney with John Hannah (far left) aboard Air Force Two

== Personal life ==
Hannah and his wife Laura have two children and are members of the Temple Sinai, Washington, D.C., having joined in the fall of 2006.

Political offices
Preceded by Scooter Libby	National Security Advisor to the Vice President of the United States; 2005–2009	Succeeded by Tony Blinken
