= Scooter Libby =

American lawyer and political advisor (born 1950)

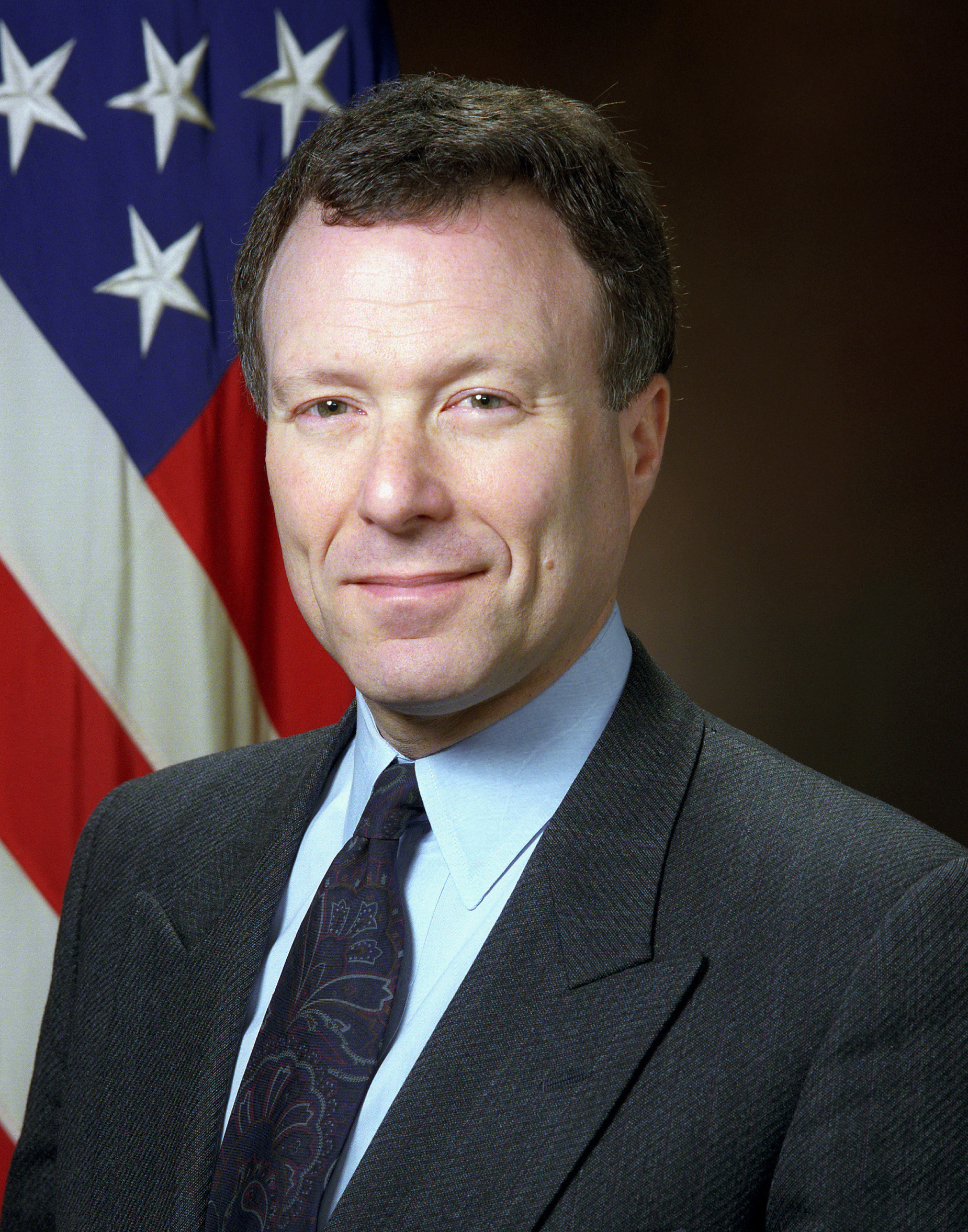
- Libby in 1991

Chief of Staff to the Vice President of the United States
- In office January 20, 2001 – October 28, 2005
- Vice President: Dick Cheney
- Preceded by: Charles Burson
- Succeeded by: David Addington

National Security Advisor to the Vice President of the United States
- In office January 20, 2001 – October 28, 2005
- Vice President: Dick Cheney
- Preceded by: Leon Fuerth
- Succeeded by: John P. Hannah

Personal details
- Born: I. Lewis Libby; August 22, 1950 (age 76) New Haven, Connecticut, U.S.
- Party: Republican
- Spouse: Harriet Grant
- Children: 2
- Education: Yale University (BA); Columbia University (JD)

I. Lewis "Scooter" Libby (first name generally given as Irv, Irve or Irving; born August 22, 1950) is an American lawyer and former chief of staff to Vice President Dick Cheney. He became known as a high-ranking staff person to be indicted by a grand jury on charges related to an intelligence investigation. He was convicted but later granted clemency by Republican president George W. Bush and fully pardoned by Republican president Donald Trump.

From 2001 to 2005, Libby held the offices of Assistant to the Vice President for National Security Affairs, Chief of Staff to the Vice President of the United States, and Assistant to the President during the administration of President George W. Bush.

In October 2005, Libby resigned from all three government positions after he was indicted on five counts by a federal grand jury concerning the investigation of the leak of the covert identity of Central Intelligence Agency officer Valerie Plame Wilson. He was subsequently convicted of four counts (one count of obstruction of justice, two counts of perjury, and one count of making false statements), making him the highest-ranking White House official convicted in a government scandal since John Poindexter, the national security adviser to President Ronald Reagan convicted in 1990 in the Iran–Contra affair.

After Libby's failed appeal and a high-pressure lobbying campaign for Libby's full pardon by Vice President Cheney, President Bush commuted Libby's sentence of 31 months in federal prison, leaving the other parts of his sentence intact. As a consequence of his conviction in United States v. Libby, Libby's license to practice law was suspended in 2007, for a period of at least five years. He gained reinstatement in 2016. President Donald Trump fully pardoned Libby on April 13, 2018.

== Personal history ==
=== Background and education ===
Libby was born to an affluent Jewish family in New Haven, Connecticut. His father, Irving Lewis Leibovitz, was an investment banker who changed his family's original surname from Leibovitz to Libby.

Libby graduated from the Eaglebrook School, in Deerfield, Massachusetts, a junior boarding school, in 1965. The family lived in the Washington, D.C. region, Miami, Florida, and Connecticut prior to Libby's graduation from Phillips Academy in Andover, Massachusetts in 1968.

He and his elder brother, Hank, a tax lawyer (now retired) were the first in the family to graduate from college. Libby attended Yale University in New Haven, graduating magna cum laude in 1972. He joined the Skull and Bones secret society in his senior year at Yale. As Yale Daily News reporter Jack Mirkinson observes, "Even though he would eventually become a prominent Republican, Libby's political beginnings would not have pointed in that direction. He served as vice president of the Yale College Democrats and later campaigned for Michael Dukakis when he was running for governor of Massachusetts." According to Mirkinson: "Two particular Yale courses helped guide Libby's future endeavors. One of these was a creative writing course, which started Libby on a 20-year mission to complete a novel ... [later published as] The Apprentice ... [and] a political science class with professor and future Deputy Secretary of Defense Paul Wolfowitz. In an interview with author James Mann, Libby said Wolfowitz was one of his favorite professors, and their professional relationship did not end with the class." Wolfowitz became a significant mentor in his later professional life.

In 1975, as a Harlan Fiske Stone Scholar, Libby received his Juris Doctor (J.D.) degree from Columbia Law School.

=== Marriage and family ===
Libby is married to Harriet Grant, whom he met in Philadelphia, Pennsylvania, in the late 1980s, while he was a partner and she an associate in the law firm then known as Dickstein, Shapiro & Morin: "'When he and Harriet became serious,' Dickstein partner Kenneth Simon wrote, 'she chose to leave the firm rather than maintain the awkward situation of an associate dating a partner.'" Libby and Grant married in the early 1990s, have a son and a daughter, and live in McLean, Virginia.

=== Name ===
Libby has been secretive about his full name. He was prosecuted as I. Lewis Libby, also known as "Scooter Libby". National Public Radio's Day to Day reported that the 1972 Yale Banner (the yearbook of Yale) gave his name as Irve Lewis Libby Jr.; it is unclear if Irve is his given name, or if it is short for Irving, as it was for his father. CBS, the BBC, and The New York Times's John Tierney have all used this spelling of his first name. The Times's Eric Schmitt spelled it Irv, though he cited a phone interview with Libby's brother, and did not clarify if he had asked for a spelling.

At times, including in the Yale Banner, and as documented in a federal directory cited by Ron Kampeas and others, Libby has used the suffix Jr. after his name. At other times, however, as listed in his federal indictment and United States v. Libby, which give his alias as Scooter Libby, there is no Jr. after Libby's name. The Columbia Alumni Association online directory lists him as I. Lewis Libby, with a first name of "I." and birth first name of "Irve".

Libby has also been secretive about the origin of his nickname Scooter. The New York Times's Eric Schmitt, citing the aforementioned interview with Libby's brother, wrote that "His nickname 'Scooter' derives from the day [his] father watched him crawling in his crib and joked, 'He's a Scooter!'" In a February 2002 interview on Larry King Live, King asked Libby specifically, "Where did 'Scooter' come from?"; Libby replied: "Oh, it goes way back to when I was a kid. Some people ask me if ... [crosstalk] ... as you did earlier, if it's related to Phil Rizzuto [nicknamed 'The Scooter']. I had the range but not the arm."

== The Apprentice ==
Libby's only novel, The Apprentice, about a group of travelers stranded in northern Japan in the winter of 1903, during a smallpox epidemic in the run-up to the Russo-Japanese War, was first published in a hardback edition by Graywolf Press in St. Paul, Minnesota in 1996, and reprinted as a trade paperback by St. Martin's Thomas Dunne Books in 2002. After Libby's indictment in the Plame affair grand jury investigation in 2005, St. Martin's Press reissued The Apprentice as a mass market paperback (Griffin imprint). The Apprentice has been described as "a thriller ... that includes references to bestiality, pedophilia and rape."

== Law career ==
After earning his J.D. from Columbia in 1975, Libby joined the firm of Schnader, Harrison, Segal & Lewis LLP. He was admitted to the bar of the Commonwealth of Pennsylvania on October 27, 1976, and to the bar of the District of Columbia Court of Appeals on May 19, 1978.

Libby practiced law at Schnader for six years before joining the U.S. State Department policy planning staff, at the invitation of his former Yale professor, Paul Wolfowitz, in 1981. In 1985, returning to private practice, he joined the firm then known as Dickstein, Shapiro & Morin (now Dickstein Shapiro LLP), becoming a partner in 1986 and working there until 1989, when he left to work in the U.S. Defense Department, again under his former Yale professor Paul Wolfowitz, until January 1993.

In 1993, returning to private legal practice from government, Libby became the managing partner of the Washington, D.C., office of Mudge, Rose, Guthrie, Alexander & Ferdon (formerly Nixon, Mudge, Rose, Guthrie, and Alexander); in 1995, along with his Mudge Rose colleague, Leonard Garment––who had replaced John Dean as acting Special Counsel to U.S. President Richard Nixon for the last two years of his presidency dominated by Watergate, and who had hired Libby at Mudge Rose twenty years later––and three other lawyers from that firm, Libby joined the Washington, D.C., office of Dechert Price & Rhoads (now part of Dechert LLP), where he was a managing partner, a member of its litigation department, and chaired its Public Policy Practice Group. His work there was well regarded, with President Clinton recognizing Libby as one of three "distinguished Republican lawyers" who worked on the Marc Rich pardon case.

In 2001 Libby left the firm to return to work again in government, as Vice President Cheney's chief of staff.

Fugitive billionaire commodities trader Marc Rich, who, along with his business partner Pincus Green, had been indicted of tax evasion and illegal trading with Iran, and who, with Green, was ultimately pardoned by President Bill Clinton, was a client whom Leonard Garment had hired Libby to help represent around the spring of 1985, after Rich and Green had first engaged Garment. Libby stopped representing Rich in the spring of 2000; early in March 2001, at a "contentious" Congressional hearing to review Clinton's pardons, Libby testified that he thought the prosecution's case against Rich "misconstrued the facts and the law". Jackson Hogen, Libby's roommate at Yale University, told U.S. News & World Report's Kenneth T. Walsh, "'He is intensely partisan ... in that if he is your counsel, he'll embrace your case and try to figure a way out of whatever noose you are ensnared in.'" According to a House Committee on Government Reform report, however, "The arguments made by Garment, [William Bradford] Reynolds and Libby [in their testimony] focused on the claim that the SDNY was criminalizing what should have been a civil tax case. They did not make, compile, or in any other way lay the groundwork for, or make a case for a Presidential pardon. When former President Clinton stated that they 'reviewed and advocated' 'the case for the pardons,' he suggested that they were somehow involved in arguing that Rich and Green should receive pardons. This was completely untrue". (p. 162)

=== Bar suspension and disbarment ===
Before his indictment in United States v. Libby, Libby had been a licensed lawyer, admitted to the bars of the District of Columbia Court of Appeals and the Supreme Court of Pennsylvania, although his Pennsylvania law license was inactive, and he had already been suspended from the Washington, D.C. Office of Bar Counsel (D.C. Bar) for non-payment of fees. The Chief Judge of the District of Columbia Court of Appeals recommended disbarment upon confirmation of his conviction, which Libby had initially indicated that he would appeal. Having suspended his license to practice law on April 3, 2007, the D.C. Bar "disbarred [him] pursuant to D.C. Code § 11-2503(a)" on legal grounds of "moral turpitude", effective April 11, 2007, and recommended to the D.C. Court of Appeals his disbarment if his conviction were not overturned on appeal. On December 10, 2007, Libby's lawyers announced his decision "to drop his appeal of his conviction in the CIA leak case". On March 20, 2008, following the dropping of his appeal of his conviction, the District of Columbia Court of Appeals disbarred Libby.

Libby also lost his license to practice or appear in court in Pennsylvania.

== Government public service and political career ==
In 1981, after working as a lawyer in the Philadelphia firm Schnader LLP, Libby accepted the invitation of his former Yale University political science professor and mentor Paul Wolfowitz to join the U.S. State Department's policy planning staff. From 1982 to 1985, Libby served as director of special projects in the Bureau of East Asian and Pacific Affairs. In 1985 he received the Foreign Affairs Award for Public Service from the United States Department of Defense, and he resigned from government to enter private legal practice at Dickstein, Shapiro, and Morin. In 1989, he went to work at the Pentagon, again under Wolfowitz, as principal deputy under-secretary for strategy and resources at the U.S. Defense Department.

During the George H. W. Bush administration, Libby was confirmed by the U.S. Senate as deputy under secretary of defense for policy, serving from 1992 to 1993. In 1992 he also served as legal adviser for the House Select Committee on U.S. National Security and Military/Commercial Concerns with the People's Republic of China. Libby co-authored the draft of the Defense Planning Guidance for the 1994–1999 fiscal years (dated February 18, 1992) with Wolfowitz for Dick Cheney, who was then Secretary of Defense. In 1993 Libby received the Distinguished Service Award from the U.S. Defense Department and the Distinguished Public Service Award from the U.S. State Department before resuming private legal practice first at Mudge Rose and then at Dechert.

Libby was part of a network of neo-conservatives known as the "Vulcans"—its other members included Wolfowitz, Condoleezza Rice, and Donald Rumsfeld. While he was still a managing partner of Dechert Price & Rhoads, he was a signatory to the "Statement of Principles" of the Project for the New American Century (PNAC) (a document dated June 3, 1997). He joined Wolfowitz, PNAC co-founders William Kristol, Robert Kagan, and other "Project Participants" in developing the PNAC's September 2000 report entitled, "Rebuilding America's Defenses: Strategy, Forces, and Resources for a New Century".

After becoming Cheney's chief of staff in 2001, Libby was reportedly nicknamed "Germ Boy" at the White House, for insisting on universal smallpox vaccination. He was also nicknamed "Dick Cheney's Dick Cheney" for his close working relationship with the Vice President. Mary Matalin, who worked with Libby as an adviser to Cheney during Bush's first term, said of him "He is to the vice president what the vice president is to the president."

Libby was active in the Defense Policy Board Advisory Committee of the Pentagon when it was chaired by Richard Perle during the early years of the George W. Bush administration (2001–2003). At various points in his career, Libby has also held positions with the American Bar Association, been on the advisory board of the RAND Corporation's Center for Russia and Eurasia, and been a legal adviser to the United States House of Representatives, as well as served as a consultant for the defense contractor Northrop Grumman.

Libby was also actively involved in the Bush administration's efforts to negotiate the Israeli–Palestinian "road map" for peace; for example, he participated in a series of meetings with Jewish leaders in early December 2002 and a meeting with two aides of then-Israeli Prime Minister Ariel Sharon in mid April 2003, culminating in the Red Sea Summit on June 4, 2004. In their highly controversial and widely contested "Working Paper" entitled "The Israel Lobby and U.S. Foreign Policy", University of Chicago political science professor John J. Mearsheimer and academic dean of the John F. Kennedy School of Government at Harvard University Stephen M. Walt argue that Libby was among the Bush administration's most "fervently pro-Israel ... officials" (20).

=== Awards for government service ===
- Distinguished Service Award, United States Department of Defense, 1993
- Distinguished Public Service Award, United States Department of the Navy, 1993
- Foreign Affairs Award for Public Service, United States Department of State, 1985

=== Subsequent work experience ===
From January 2006 until March 7, 2007, the day after his conviction in United States v. Libby, when he resigned, Libby served as a "senior adviser" at the Hudson Institute, to "focus on issues relating to the War on Terror and the future of Asia ... offer research guidance and ... advise the institute in strategic planning." His resignation was announced by the Hudson Institute in a press release dated March 8, 2007. However, he has served as Senior Vice President of the Hudson Institute at least since 2010.

Libby also serves as a member of the Blue Ribbon Study Panel on Biodefense, a group that encourages and advocates changes to government policy to strengthen national biodefense. In order to address biological threats facing the nation, the Blue Ribbon Study Panel on Biodefense created a 33 step initiative for the U.S. Government to implement. Headed by former Senator Joe Lieberman and former governor Tom Ridge, the Study Panel assembled in Washington, D.C., for four meetings concerning current biodefense programs. The Study Panel concluded that the federal government had little to no defense mechanisms in case of a biological event. The Study Panel's final report, The National Blueprint for Biodefense, proposes a string of solutions and recommendations for the U.S. Government to take, including items such as giving the vice president authority over biodefense responsibilities and merging the entire biodefense budget. These solutions represent the panel's call to action in order to increase awareness and activity for pandemic-related issues.

== Involvement in the Plame affair ==
Between 2003 and 2005, intense speculation centered on the possibility that Libby may have been the administration official who had "leaked" classified employment information about Valerie Plame, a covert Central Intelligence Agency (CIA) agent and the wife of Iraq War critic Joseph C. Wilson, to New York Times reporter Judith Miller and other reporters and later tried to hide his having done so.

In August 2005, as revealed in grand jury testimony audiotapes played during the trial and reported in many news accounts, Libby testified that he met with Judith Miller, a reporter with The New York Times, on July 8, 2003, and discussed Plame with her.

Although Libby signed a "blanket waiver" allowing journalists to discuss their conversations with him pursuant to the CIA leak grand jury investigation, Miller maintained that such a waiver did not serve to allow her to reveal her source to that grand jury; moreover, Miller argued that Libby's general waiver pertaining to all journalists could have been coerced and that she would only testify before that grand jury if given an individual waiver.

After refusing to testify about her July 2003 meeting with Libby, Judith Miller was jailed on July 7, 2005, for contempt of court. Months later, however, her new attorney, Robert Bennett, told her that she already had possessed a written, voluntary waiver from Libby all along. After Miller had served most of her sentence, Libby reiterated that he had indeed given her a "waiver" both "voluntarily and personally." He attached the following letter, which, when released publicly, became the subject of further speculation about Libby's possible motives in sending it:

As noted above, my lawyer confirmed my waiver to other reporters in just the way he did with your lawyer. Why? Because as I am sure will not be news to you, the public report of every other reporter's testimony makes clear that they did not discuss Ms. Plame's name or identity with me, or knew about her before our call.

After agreeing to testify, Miller was released on September 29, 2005, appearing before the grand jury the next day, but the charge against her was rescinded only after she testified again on October 12, 2005. For her second grand jury appearance, Miller produced a notebook from a previously undisclosed meeting with Libby on June 23, 2003, two weeks before Wilson's New York Times op-ed was published. In her account published in the Times on October 16, 2005, based on her notes, Miller reports:

... in an interview with me on June 23 [2003], Vice President Dick Cheney's chief of staff, I. Lewis Libby, discussed Mr. Wilson's activities and placed blame for intelligence failures on the CIA. In later conversations with me, on July 8 and July 12 [2003], Mr. Libby, ... [at the time] Mr. Cheney's top aide, played down the importance of Mr. Wilson's mission and questioned his performance ... My notes indicate that well before Mr. Wilson published his critique, Mr. Libby told me that Mr. Wilson's wife may have worked on unconventional weapons at the CIA. ... My notes do not show that Mr. Libby identified Mr. Wilson's wife by name. Nor do they show that he described Valerie Wilson as a covert agent or "operative"...

Her notation on her July 8, 2003 meeting with Libby does contain the name "Valerie Flame [sic]", which she added retrospectively. While Miller reveals publicly that she herself had misidentified the last name of Wilson's wife (aka "Valerie Plame") in her own marginal notes on their interview as "Flame" instead of "Plame", in her grand jury (and later trial testimony), she remained uncertain when, how, and why she arrived at that name and did not attribute it to Libby:

I was not permitted to take notes of what I told the grand jury, and my interview notes on Mr. Libby are sketchy in places. It is also difficult, more than two years later, to parse the meaning and context of phrases, of underlining and of parentheses. On one page of my interview notes, for example, I wrote the name "Valerie Flame." Yet, as I told Mr. Fitzgerald, I simply could not recall where that came from, when I wrote it or why the name was misspelled ... I testified that I did not believe the name came from Mr. Libby, in part because the notation does not appear in the same part of my notebook as the interview notes from him.

A year and a half later, a jury convicted Libby of obstruction of justice and perjury in his grand jury testimony and making false statements to federal investigators about when and how he learned that Plame was a CIA agent.

On April 13, 2018, Libby was pardoned by President Donald Trump.

== Indictment and resignation ==
On October 28, 2005, as a result of the CIA leak grand jury investigation, Special Counsel Fitzgerald indicted Libby on five counts: one count of obstruction of justice, two counts of making false statements when interviewed by agents of the FBI, and two counts of perjury in his testimony before the grand jury. Pursuant to the grand jury investigation, Libby had told FBI investigators that he first heard of Mrs. Wilson's CIA employment from Cheney, and then later heard it from journalist Tim Russert, and acted as if he did not have that information. The indictment alleges that statements to federal investigators and the grand jury were intentionally false, in that Libby had numerous conversations about Mrs. Wilson's CIA employment, including his conversations with Judith Miller (see above), before speaking to Russert; Russert did not tell Libby about Mrs. Wilson's CIA employment; prior to talking with such reporters, Libby knew with certainty that she was employed by the CIA; and Libby told reporters that she worked for the CIA without making any disclaimer that he was uncertain of that fact. The false statements counts in the Libby indictment charge that he intentionally made those false statements to the FBI; the perjury counts charge that he intentionally lied to the grand jury in repeating those false statements; and the obstruction of justice count charges that Libby intentionally made those false statements in order to mislead the grand jury, thus impeding Fitzgerald's grand jury investigation of the truth about the leaking of Mrs. Wilson's then-classified, covert CIA identity.

== Trial, conviction, and sentencing ==
On March 6, 2007, the jury convicted him on four of the five counts: obstruction of justice, one count of making false statements when interviewed by agents of the FBI, and two counts of perjury. They acquitted him on count three, the second charge of making false statements when interviewed by federal agents about his conversations with Time reporter Matthew Cooper.

Libby retained attorney Ted Wells of the firm of Paul, Weiss, Rifkind, Wharton & Garrison to represent him. Wells had successfully defended former Secretary of Agriculture Mike Espy against a 30-count indictment and had also participated in the successful defense of former Secretary of Labor Raymond Donovan.

After Judge Reggie Walton denied Libby's motion to dismiss, the press initially reported that Libby would testify at the trial. Libby's criminal trial, United States v. Libby, began on January 16, 2007. A parade of Pulitzer Prize–winning journalists testified, including Bob Woodward, Walter Pincus and Glenn Kessler of The Washington Post and Judith Miller and David E. Sanger of The New York Times. Despite earlier press reports and widespread speculation, neither Libby nor Vice President Cheney testified. The jury began deliberations on February 21, 2007.

=== Verdict ===
After deliberating for 10 days, the jury rendered its verdict on March 6, 2007. It convicted Libby on four of the five counts against him: two counts of perjury, one count of obstruction of justice in a grand jury investigation, and one of the two counts of making false statements to federal investigators.

After the verdict, initially, Libby's lawyers announced that he would seek a new trial, and that, if that attempt were to fail, they would appeal Libby's conviction. Libby did not speak to reporters. Libby's defense team eventually decided against seeking a new trial.

Speaking to the media outside the courtroom after the verdict, Fitzgerald said that "The jury worked very long and hard and deliberated at length ... [and] was obviously convinced beyond a reasonable doubt that the defendant had lied and obstructed justice in a serious manner ... I do not expect to file any further charges." The trial confirmed that the leak came first from then-Deputy Secretary of State Richard Armitage; since Fitzgerald did not charge Armitage and did not charge anyone else, Libby's conviction effectively ended the investigation.

In his October 28, 2005, press conference about the grand jury's indictment, Fitzgerald had already explained that Libby's obstruction of justice through perjury and false statements had prevented the grand jury from determining whether the leak violated federal law.

During his media appearance outside the courtroom after the verdict in the Libby case, Fitzgerald fielded questions from the press about others involved in the Plame affair and in the CIA leak grand jury investigation, such as Armitage and Cheney, whom he had already described as under "a cloud", as already addressed in his conduct of the case and in his closing arguments in court.

=== Sentencing ===
Given current federal sentencing guidelines, which are not mandatory, the conviction could have resulted in a sentence ranging from no imprisonment to imprisonment of up to 25 years and a fine of $1,000,000; yet, as Sniffen and Apuzzo observe, "federal sentencing guidelines will probably prescribe far less." In practice, according to federal sentencing data, three-fourths of the 198 defendants found guilty of obstruction of justice in 2006 served jail time. The average length of jail time on this charge alone was 70 months.

On June 5, 2007, Judge Walton sentenced Libby to 30 months in prison and fined him $250,000, clarifying that Libby would begin his sentence immediately. According to Apuzzo and Yost, the judge also "placed him on two years probation after his prison sentence expires. There is no parole in the federal system, but Libby would be eligible for release after two years." In addition, Judge Walton required Libby to provide "400 hours of community service" during his supervised release. On June 5, 2007, after the announcement of Libby's sentencing, CNN reported that Libby still "plans to appeal the verdict".

That day, in response to the sentencing, Vice President Cheney issued a statement in Libby's defense on The White House website. The statement concluded: "Speaking as friends, we hope that our system will return a final result consistent with what we know of this fine man."

Joseph and Valerie Wilson posted their statement on Libby's sentencing in United States v. Libby on their website, "grateful that justice has been served."

=== Order to report to prison pending appeal of verdict ===
After the June 5 sentencing, Walton said he was inclined to jail Libby after the defense laid out its proposed appeal, but the judge told attorneys he was open to changing his mind; however, on June 14, 2007, Walton ordered Libby to report to prison while his attorneys appealed the conviction. Libby's attorneys asked that the order be stayed, but Walton denied the request and told Libby that he would have 10 days to appeal the ruling. In denying Libby's request, which had questioned Fitzgerald's authority to make the charges in the first place, Walton supported Fitzgerald's authority in the case. He said: "Everyone is accountable, and if you work in the White House, and if it's perceived that somehow (you're) linked at the hip, the American public would have serious questions about the fairness of any investigation of a high-level official conducted by the attorney general." The judge was also responding to an Amicus curiae brief that he had permitted to be filed, which had not apparently convinced him to change his mind, as he subsequently denied Libby bail during his appeal. His "order grant[ing] the [legal academic] scholars permission to file their brief ..." contained a caustic footnote questioning the motivation of the legal academics and suggesting he might not give a great deal of weight to their opinion[:]

... It is an impressive show of public service when twelve prominent and distinguished current and former law professors are able to amass their collective wisdom in the course of only several days to provide their legal expertise to the court on behalf of a criminal defendant. The Court trusts that this is a reflection of these eminent academics' willingness in the future to step to the plate and provide like assistance in cases involving any of the numerous litigants, both in this Court and throughout the courts of this nation, who lack the financial means to fully and properly articulate the merits of their legal positions even in instances where failure to do so could result in monetary penalties, incarceration, or worse. The Court will certainly not hesitate to call for such assistance from these luminaries, as necessary in the interests of justice and equity, whenever similar questions arise in the cases that come before it."

Moreover, when the hearing started, "in the interest of full disclosure," Walton informed the court that he had "received a number of harassing, angry and mean-spirited phone calls and messages. Some wishing bad things on me and my family ... [T]hose types of things will have no impact ... I initially threw them away, but then there were more, some that were more hateful ... [T]hey are being kept."

New York Times reporters Neil Lewis and David Stout estimated subsequently that Libby's prison sentence could begin within "two months", explaining that

Judge Walton's decision means that the defense lawyers will probably ask a federal appeals court to block the sentence, a long-shot move. It also sharpens interest in a question being asked by Mr. Libby's supporters and critics alike: Will President Bush pardon Mr. Libby? ... So far, the president has expressed sympathy for Mr. Libby and his family but has not tipped his hand on the pardon issue. ... If the president does not pardon him, and if an appeals court refuses to second-guess Judge Walton's decision, Mr. Libby will probably be ordered to report to prison in six to eight weeks' time. Federal prison authorities will decide where. "Unless the Court of Appeals overturns my ruling, he will have to report", Judge Walton said.

=== Failure of Libby's appealing to begin prison sentence ===
On June 20, 2007, Libby appealed Walton's ruling in federal appeals court. The following day, Walton filed a 30-page expanded ruling, in which he explained his decision to deny Libby bail in more detail.

On July 2, 2007, the U.S. Court of Appeals for the D.C. Circuit denied Libby's request for a delay and release from his prison sentence, stating that Libby "has not shown that the appeal raises a substantial question under federal law that would merit letting him remain free," increasing "pressure on President George W. Bush to decide soon whether to pardon Libby ... as the former White House official's supporters have urged."

=== Presidential commutation ===
2018 pardon granted by Donald Trump

Soon after the verdict several prominent high ranking white house officials including John Bolton, Donald Rumsfeld, and Dick Cheney called for Libby to be pardoned by President George W. Bush. Some of those who called for pardon were posted online by the Libby Legal Defense Trust (LLDT). A few conservative commentators and columnists including Ann Coulter, Byron York, Bill Kristol, and left-wing journalist Christopher Hitchens supported pardoning Libby. U.S. Senate Majority Leader Harry Reid issued a press release about the verdict, urging Bush to pledge not to pardon Libby, and other Democratic politicians followed his lead.

Surveying "the pardon battle" and citing both pro and con publications, The Washington Post online columnist Dan Froomkin concludes that many U.S. newspapers opposed a presidential pardon for Libby. Much of this commentary obscured the fact that the clemency power provided the President with several options short of a full, unconditional pardon. In an op-ed published in The Washington Post, former federal prosecutor and conservative activist William Otis argued the sentence was too stringent and that, instead of pardoning Libby, Bush should commute his sentence.

After the sentencing, Bush stated on camera that he would "not intervene until Libby's legal team has exhausted all of its avenues of appeal ... It wouldn't be appropriate for me to discuss the case until after the legal remedies have run its course." Ultimately, less than a month later, on July 2, 2007, Bush chose Otis's 'third option' — "neither prison nor pardon" — in commuting Libby's prison sentence.

After Libby was denied bail during his appeal process on July 2, 2007, Bush commuted Libby's 30-month federal prison sentence, calling it "excessive", but he did not change the other parts of the sentence and their conditions. That presidential commutation left in place the felony conviction, the $250,000 fine, and the terms of probation. Some have criticized the move, as presidential commutations are rarely issued, but when granted they have generally occurred after the convicted person has already served a substantial portion of his or her sentence: "We can't find any cases, certainly in the last half-century, where the president commuted a sentence before it had even started to be served," said former Justice Department pardon attorney Margaret Colgate Love. Others, notably Cheney himself who argued that Libby was unfairly charged by a politically motivated prosecution, believed that the commutation fell short, as Libby would likely never practice law again.

At the time, Bush explained his "Grant of Executive Clemency" to Libby, in part, as follows:

Mr. Libby was sentenced to thirty months of prison, two years of probation, and a $250,000 fine. In making the sentencing decision, the district court rejected the advice of the probation office, which recommended a lesser sentence and the consideration of factors that could have led to a sentence of home confinement or probation.

I respect the jury's verdict. But I have concluded that the prison sentence given to Mr. Libby is excessive. Therefore, I am commuting the portion of Mr. Libby's sentence that required him to spend thirty months in prison.

My decision to commute his prison sentence leaves in place a harsh punishment for Mr. Libby. The reputation he gained through his years of public service and professional work in the legal community is forever damaged. His wife and young children have also suffered immensely. He will remain on probation. The significant fines imposed by the judge will remain in effect. The consequences of his felony conviction on his former life as a lawyer, public servant, and private citizen will be long-lasting.

Libby paid the required fine of "$250,400, which included a 'special assessment' of costs" that same day.

Bush's explanation was written by Fred F. Fielding, White House Counsel during the last two years of Bush's presidency. According to a Time article published six months after Bush left office, Fielding worded the commutation "in a way that would make it harder for Bush to revisit it in the future ...; [the] language was intended to send an unmistakable message, internally as well as externally: No one is above the law." The article suggested that there was a fundamental difference between how Bush and Cheney viewed the "war on terror", with aides close to Bush feeling that Cheney had misled the President and damaged the administration's moral character with the Plame leak.

Libby's lawyer, Theodore V. Wells, Jr. "issued a brief statement saying Mr. Libby and his family 'wished to express their gratitude for the president's decision ... We continue to believe in Mr. Libby's innocence'. ... "

Prosecutor Patrick Fitzgerald, however, took issue with Bush's description of the sentence as 'excessive', saying it was "[i]mposed pursuant to the laws governing sentencings which occur every day throughout this country ... It is fundamental to the rule of law that all citizens stand before the bar of justice as equals ... [T]hat principle guided the judge during both the trial and the sentencing," Fitzgerald said.

The day after the commuting of Libby's sentence, James Rowley (Bloomberg News) reported that Bush had not ruled out pardoning Libby in the future and that Bush's press spokesman, Tony Snow, denied any political motivation in the commutation. Quoting Snow, Rowley added: "'The president is getting pounded on the right because he didn't do a full pardon.' If Bush were 'doing the weather-vane thing' he 'would have done something differently.'"

Democratic politicians' responses stressed their outrage at what they called a disgraceful abrogation of justice, and, that evening CNN reported that Representative John Conyers, Jr., Democrat of Michigan, announced that there would be a formal Congressional investigation of Bush's commutation of Libby's sentence and other presidential reprieves.

The hearing on "The Use and Misuse of Presidential Clemency Power for Executive Branch Officials" was held by the United States House Judiciary Committee, chaired by Rep. Conyers, on July 11, 2007.

Just a few days later, however, Judge Walton questioned "whether ... [Libby] will face two years of probation, as [President Bush] said he would," because the supervised release time is conditioned on Libby's serving the prison sentence, and he "directed the special prosecutor, Patrick J. Fitzgerald, and ... [Libby's] lawyers to file arguments on the point. ... " "If Judge Walton does not impose any supervised release, it could undercut ... [Bush's] argument that ... Libby still faced stiff justice." That issue was resolved on July 10, 2007, clearing the way for Libby to begin serving the rest of his sentence, the supervised release and 400 hours of community service.

In response to Bush's justifications for clemency, liberal commentator Harlan J. Protass noted that in Rita v. United States, the case of a defendant convicted of perjury in front of a grand jury which had been decided two weeks earlier by the U.S. Supreme Court, the U.S. government had successfully argued that sentences that fall within Federal Sentencing Guidelines are presumed to be "reasonable", regardless of individual circumstances.

Reportedly outraged by Bush's commutation of Libby's prison sentence, on July 2, 2007, Wilson told CNN: "I have nothing to say to Scooter Libby ... I don't owe this administration. They owe my wife and my family an apology for having betrayed her. Scooter Libby is a traitor. Bush's action ... demonstrates that the White House is corrupt from top to bottom." He reiterated this perspective on the commutation in the House Judiciary Committee hearing on July 11, 2007, vehemently protesting that a Republican congressman was engaging in "yet a further smear of my wife's good name and my good name."

According to a USA Today/Gallup Poll conducted from July 6 to July 8, 2007, "most Americans disagree with President George W. Bush's decision to intervene" on Libby's behalf in the case.

Several months after Bush's action, Judge Walton commented publicly on it. He spoke in favor of applying the law equally, stating: "The downside [of the commutation] is there are a lot of people in America who think that justice is determined to a large degree by who you are and that what you have plays a large role in what kind of justice you receive. ... "

Bush took no further action with respect to Libby's conviction or sentence during his presidential term, despite entreaties from conservatives that he should be pardoned. Two days after their term expired, former Vice President Cheney expressed his regret that Bush had not pardoned Libby on his last day in office.

=== Press coverage of Libby's trial ===
Blogs played a prominent role in the press coverage of Libby's trial. Scott Shane, in his article "For Liberal Bloggers, Libby Trial Is Fun and Fodder", published in The New York Times on February 15, 2007, quotes Robert Cox, president of the Media Bloggers Association, who wrote that the trial was "the first federal case for which independent bloggers have been given official credentials along with reporters from the traditional news media." The trial was followed in the mass media and engaged the interest of both professional legal experts and the general public. While awaiting the judge's ruling pertaining to supervised release and the "400 hours of community service that Judge Walton imposed", for example, bloggers discussed the legal issues involved in these non-commuted parts of Libby's sentence and their effects on Libby's future life experiences.

=== Criticism of investigation ===
On August 28, 2006, Christopher Hitchens asserted that Richard Armitage was the primary source of the Valerie Plame leak and that Fitzgerald knew this at the beginning of his investigation. This was supported a month later by Armitage himself, who stated that Fitzgerald had instructed him not to go public with this information. Investor's Business Daily questioned Fitzgerald's truthfulness in an editorial, stating "From top to bottom, this has been one of the most disgraceful abuses of prosecutorial power in this country's history ... The Plame case proves [Fitzgerald] can bend the truth with the proficiency of the slickest of pols."

In a September 2008 Wall Street Journal editorial, attorney Alan Dershowitz cited the "questionable investigation[s]" of Scooter Libby as evidence of the problems brought to the criminal justice process by "politically appointed and partisan attorney[s] general". In April 2015, also writing in The Wall Street Journal, Hoover Institution fellow Peter Berkowitz argued that statements by Judith Miller, in her recently published memoir, raised anew contentions that her testimony was inaccurate and that Fitzgerald's conduct as prosecutor was inappropriate.

== The Wilsons' civil suit ==
On July 13, 2006, Joseph and Valerie Wilson filed a civil lawsuit against Libby, Dick Cheney, Karl Rove, and other unnamed senior White House officials (among whom they later added Richard Armitage) for their role in the public disclosure of Valerie Wilson's classified CIA status. Judge John D. Bates dismissed the Wilsons' lawsuit on jurisdictional grounds on July 19, 2007. The Wilsons appealed Bates's district-court decision the next day. Agreeing with the Bush administration, the Obama Justice Department argued that the Wilsons had no legitimate grounds to sue. Melanie Sloan, one of the Wilsons' attorneys, said: "We are deeply disappointed that the Obama administration has failed to recognize the grievous harm top Bush White House officials inflicted on Joe and Valerie Wilson. The government's position cannot be reconciled with President Obama's oft-stated commitment to once again make government officials accountable for their actions."

On June 21, 2009, the U.S. Supreme Court refused to hear the appeal.

== Restoration of voting rights, law license, and presidential pardon ==
Libby's voting rights were restored on November 1, 2012 by then-Governor of Virginia Bob McDonnell. Libby was part of a larger group of individuals who had their voting rights restored by McDonnell, all of whom were non-violent offenders. Four years later, on November 3, 2016, the District of Columbia Court of Appeals granted Libby's petition for reinstatement to the D.C. Bar. On April 13, 2018, President Donald Trump pardoned Libby.

== In media portrayals ==
David Andrews played Scooter Libby in the 2010 film Fair Game, which is about the Plame affair.

Justin Kirk played Libby in the 2018 film Vice.

== See also ==
- List of disbarments in the United States
- Plame affair criminal investigation
- Project for the New American Century
- List of people granted executive clemency in the first Trump presidency
- List of people pardoned or granted clemency by the president of the United States
- List of Skull and Bones members

== Citations ==
Political offices
Preceded by Charles Burson	Chief of Staff to the Vice President of the United States; 2001–2005	Succeeded by David Addington
Preceded by Leon Fuerth	National Security Advisor to the Vice President of the United States; 2001–2005	Succeeded by John P. Hannah
