= Scooter Libby clemency controversy =

2007 American presidential controversy

The Scooter Libby clemency controversy arose when U.S. President George W. Bush commuted the prison sentence of Scooter Libby, the former Chief of Staff to Bush's vice president, Dick Cheney, on July 2, 2007. It resulted in a hearing, "The Use and Misuse of Presidential Clemency Power for Executive Branch Officials", held July 11, 2007, by the full Committee on the Judiciary of the U.S. House of Representatives. The hearing was intended to "explore the grave questions that arise when the Presidential clemency power is used to erase criminal penalties for high-ranking executive branch employees whose offenses relate to their work for the President", as well as to assess the consequences of the perjury and obstruction of justice of which vice-presidential Chief of Staff Lewis Libby was convicted March 6, 2007.

On April 13, 2018, Libby was pardoned by President Donald Trump.

== Background ==
In 2003, acting U.S. Attorney General James B. Comey appointed Special Counsel Patrick Fitzgerald to lead an investigation into the alleged criminal outing of CIA operative Valerie Plame. Plame's husband, U.S. Ambassador Joseph C. Wilson, alleged that Libby and others in the White House leaked her identity in retribution for Wilson's outspoken criticism of the administration's invasion of Iraq.

When Libby was convicted, fined, and sentenced to 30 months in prison for obstructing Fitzgerald's investigation, there was speculation as to whether his punishment would be carried out in full or the President would intervene. After President Bush commuted Libby's prison sentence, the U.S. House Judiciary Committee, chaired by Representative John Conyers (D-MI), held a hearing to investigate what many in law and government saw as an abuse of presidential power. Conyers explained the rationale behind the hearing in a letter to the president:

Dear President Bush:

Like many Americans, I was troubled to learn of your decision to commute the sentence of Vice President Cheney's former Chief of Staff Scooter Libby. Mr. Libby was convicted of serious crimes and sentenced by a fair and well-respected federal Judge who termed the evidence of Mr. Libby's guilt 'overwhelming.' It was surprising indeed to learn that you had deemed Mr. Libby's sentence 'excessive' even before any of his appeals had run.

As you may know, my committee is holding a hearing this Wednesday titled 'The Use and Misuse of Presidential Clemency Power for Executive Branch Officials.' At this hearing we hope to learn about some of the consequences of Mr. Libby's misconduct, and we will hear from sentencing experts and people affected by federal sentencing laws as to whether or not Mr. Libby's sentence can fairly be considered 'excessive.' We will also explore the grave questions that arise when the Presidential clemency power is used to erase criminal penalties for high-ranking executive branch employees whose offenses relate to their work for the President.

=== Support ===
Libby's supporters, notably Vice President Cheney, had described the investigation and trial as politically motivated. The conviction for obstruction of justice was based on a disagreement between Libby and journalist Tim Russert. Even had Russert been correct, Libby may have honestly forgotten what was said during a single conversation in a typically busy day. Cheney argued that only an overzealous prosecutor and a liberal Washington jury would criminalize a bad memory. Cheney and his aides were initially satisfied with the commutation in 2007, as Libby would not have to report to prison. However, by late 2008, Cheney was lobbying for a full pardon, believing that President Bush "could claim the war on terrorism as his greatest legacy only if they defended at all costs the men and women" involved, so Cheney argued that he didn't want anyone "left on the battlefield".

President Bush's decision to give clemency was on the advice of his White House Counsel, Fred F. Fielding. According to aides that were close to Bush, the clemency ended up becoming the best compromise, rather than a full pardon or not intervening with Libby's sentence. Fielding worded the commutation explanation "in a way that would make it harder for Bush to revisit it in the future ...; [the] language was intended to send an unmistakable message, internally as well as externally: No one is above the law." The rest of the punishment, notably the fine and guilty conviction, was left intact and this meant that Libby would be automatically disbarred from several states, so he would likely never practice law again. As Bush himself personally opposed pardons in general, he was told that he had done more than enough by commuting Libby's sentence.

=== Dissent ===
The commutation of Libby's sentence was controversial for a number of reasons. Some, such as Chairman Conyers, implied that President Bush had abused his power in order to protect himself and Vice President Cheney from oversight:

While I recognize that the clemency power is a Presidential prerogative, your decision to commute Scooter Libby's sentence has proven highly controversial, with commentators suggesting that this act may have had the effect of removing any further incentive that Mr. Libby may have had to provide more complete information about the leak of information on Valerie Wilson's work as an intelligence agent and the role that your Vice President and you yourself may have played in that leak.

The commutation angered others, such as Oversight and Government Reform Committee Chairman Henry Waxman and Rules Committee Chairwoman Louise Slaughter, because they felt it represented a failure of accountability. Waxman:

Former President Bush once said: 'I have nothing but contempt and anger for those who betray the trust by exposing the name of our sources. They are, in my view, the most insidious of traitors.'

That's exactly what happened to Valerie Wilson. Her identity was revealed, putting her, her family, and our country at risk.

President Bush and Vice President Cheney deserve the widespread contempt they are receiving for this indefensible decision. The Libby commutation makes a mockery of our judicial system and our most fundamental values.

Slaughter:

The case against Scooter Libby always involved much more than the fate of one man. By revealing Valerie Plame's identity, the Administration endangered her life, the life of everyone in the field she had worked with, and America's national security. This illegal action set back the work of our intelligence community immeasurably by breaking bonds of trust which take years to form. Two years is a paltry price to pay for the damage done to our nation, damage Mr. Libby made possible.

The Washington Times also criticized Bush for failing to hold Libby accountable, calling his decision "neither wise nor just":

Perjury is a serious crime. This newspaper argued on behalf of its seriousness in the 1990s, during the Clinton perjury controversy, and today is no different. We'd have hoped that more conservatives would agree. The integrity of the judicial process depends on fact-finding and truth-telling. A jury found Libby guilty of not only perjury but also obstruction justice and lying to a grand jury. It handed down a very supportable verdict. This is true regardless of the trumped-up investigation and political witch hunt. It is true regardless of the unjustifiably harsh sentence.

== Testimony before the Committee ==
=== Statement of Roger C. Adams, Pardon Attorney, Department of Justice ===
Adams gave a 12-page statement on standards and policies observed by the U.S. Department of Justice in processing requests for presidential pardon or clemency. He noted that since the administration of William McKinley his department, typically in the form of a pardon attorney, has routinely assisted the president in handling such requests. Adams said this about commutation:

Let me mention briefly the matters the Department of Justice considers in formulating our recommendations in commutation cases. Those standards are set out in the U.S. Attorneys' Manual, whose relevant portions may be accessed through my office's web site. As the Manual states, and as we inform commutation applicants and their relatives, while we consider all requests carefully, a commutation of sentence is an extraordinary form of clemency that is rarely granted. Factors that weigh in favor of a commutation include disparity of the sentence as compared to those imposed on codefendants or others involved in the same crime; extraordinary medical issues—such as paralysis or blindness that make living in a prison setting unduly difficult—especially if the disability was not known at the time of sentencing; and unrewarded cooperation with the government.

=== Statement of Professor Douglas A. Berman ===
Berman took issue with the President's assertion that commuting the Libby sentence was primarily motivated by the unfairness of that sentence:

Even if one accepts the President's assertion that a 30-month prison term for Mr. Libby was excessive, it is hard to justify or understand the President's decision to commute Mr. Libby's prison sentence in its entirety. It is particularly difficult to see how, in Tony Snow's words, 'the rule of law' and 'public faith in government' have been served by enabling Mr. Libby to avoid having to serve even one day in prison following his 'serious convictions of perjury and obstruction of justice.' Indeed, the conclusion to the prosecution's sentencing memorandum submitted to the District Court in this case spotlights why a term of imprisonment for Mr. Libby seemed essential—and certainly not 'excessive'—to both Mr. Fitzgerald and Judge Walton.

Berman then quoted the memorandum:

Mr. Libby, a high-ranking public official and experienced lawyer, lied repeatedly and blatantly about matters at the heart of a criminal investigation concerning the disclosure of a covert intelligence officer's identity. He has shown no regret for his actions, which significantly impeded the investigation. Mr. Libby's prosecution was based not upon politics but upon his own conduct, as well as upon a principle fundamental to preserving our judicial system's independence from politics: that any witness, whatever his political affiliation, whatever his views on any policy or national issue, whether he works in the White House or drives a truck to earn a living, must tell the truth when he raises his hand and takes an oath in a judicial proceeding, or gives a statement to federal law enforcement officers. The judicial system has not corruptly mistreated Mr. Libby; Mr. Libby has been found by a jury of his peers to have corrupted the judicial system.

=== Statement of Thomas Cochran, Assistant Federal Public Defender ===
Cochran focussed on the discrepancy between Libby's punishment and that of another man, his client Victor A. Rita, Jr., who, in addition to having led a career and family life similar in key respects to that of Libby, had just begun serving a 33-month sentence for precisely the same counts on which Libby had been indicted. Cochran argued that the President's real rationale for commuting Libby's sentence was other than what he had represented to the public:

The President's statement listed the arguments of those critical of Mr. Libby's punishment in further justification of his decision. Those factors included: that 'the punishment [did] not fit the crime,' that 'Mr. Libby was a first-time offender with years of exceptional public service,' and that he 'was handed a harsh sentence based in part on allegations never presented to the jury.' Incredibly, the President's justifications for commuting Mr. Libby's sentence mirror Mr. Rita's arguments before the Supreme Court. However, when Mr. Rita appeared before the Supreme Court this past February, the President's Solicitor General took the opposite position and argued that 'uniformity' trumped Mr. Rita's justifications for a lesser sentence. The President's actions place his absolute constitutional pardoning power at odds with his own Solicitor General's successful argument before the Supreme Court.

=== Statement of David B. Rivkin, Jr. ===
Rivkin, a partner in Baker Hostetler, LLP and former member of the White House Counsel's Office, began his statement by pointing out that the President's powers of clemency and pardon are, for all intents and purposes, absolute. He argued that the appointment of a Special Counsel to prosecute such investigations was unnecessary and perhaps counterproductive, fostering "time and again a 'leave no stone unturned,' protracted, costly, and Inspector Javier-like [sic] pursuit of the individual being investigated."

Rivkin's central argument was that presidential commutation of Libby's sentence represented a higher form of justice than could have been delivered by the nation's legal system. He claimed that exercise of presidential clemency power, for large offenses as well as for small, was crucial to the preservation of the republic envisioned in the Constitution, since in certain cases what is right should be decided by the president, not the law:

More fundamentally, I believe that the pardon power, when properly deployed, advances the cause of justice. The Framer's [sic] understood that justice under the law, the justice of rules, procedures and 'due process', while important to our system of 'ordered' liberty, is not the only conceivable form of justice. They wanted the political branches to render a different kind of justice, driven by the considerations of equity and not by rules. It is the closest we come today to what the Founders would have called the natural law-driven justice. The President's pardon power is one example of such justice; the ability of Congress to pass private bills, which sidestep the rules governing immigration or land acquisition, is another.

Rivkin reserved especially strong criticism for "how unfair and politicized this whole exercise has been":

Jurors are human beings and as human beings want to understand a defendant's motivations. As a result, the overall narrative provided by the prosecutor, the context if you will, is extremely important. In Mr. Libby's case, Mr. Fitzgerald presented the jury the following damning narrative – there was a nefarious effort in the White House to destroy Joe Wilson's reputation and even to punish him, by allegedly hurting the career of his wife Valerie Plame; these activities were a part and parcel of the broader effort to sell the Iraq war to the American people. While I believe this narrative to be fundamentally false, it proved successful with the jury.

=== Statement of Ambassador Joseph C. Wilson, IV (ret.) ===
Wilson emphasized two points in his testimony: first, that Libby had been convicted of what was essentially a "cover-up" for a larger "underlying crime", the distortion of intelligence used to justify the 2003 invasion of Iraq:

Ultimately, this concerted effort to discredit me, ruining my wife's career along the way, has had a larger objective. This matter has always been about this administration's case for war and its willingness to mislead the American people to justify it. In order to protect its original falsehoods, the Vice President and his men decided to engage in a further betrayal of our national security. Scooter Libby sought to blame the Press, yet another deception. He was willing even to allow a journalist to spend eighty-five days in jail in a most cowardly act to avoid telling the truth.

Second, Wilson maintained that the disclosure of his wife's identity constituted a national security breach. He also pointedly referred to Karl Rove's alleged role in the affair, mentioning Rove twice by name:

President Bush promised that if any member of the White House staff were engaged in this matter, it would be a firing offense. However, the trial of Scooter Libby has proved conclusively that Karl Rove was involved, and although he escaped indictment, he still works at the White House. We also know, as a result of evidence introduced in the trial, that President Bush himself selectively declassified national security material to attempt to support the false rationale for war. The President's broken promise and his own involvement in this unseemly smear campaign reveal a chief executive willing to subvert the rule of law and system of justice that has undergirded this great republic of ours for over 200 years.

== House Judiciary Committee Members, 110th Congress ==
Majority	Minority
John Conyers, Chairman, Michigan; Howard L. Berman, California; Rick Boucher, Virginia; Jerrold Nadler, New York; Robert C. Scott, Virginia; Mel Watt, North Carolina; Zoe Lofgren, California; Sheila Jackson-Lee, Texas; Maxine Waters, California; Bill Delahunt, Massachusetts; Robert Wexler, Florida; Linda T. Sánchez, California; Steve Cohen, Tennessee; Hank Johnson, Georgia; Luis Gutierrez, Illinois; Brad Sherman, California; Anthony D. Weiner, New York; Adam B. Schiff, California; Artur Davis, Alabama; Debbie Wasserman Schultz, Florida; Keith Ellison, Minnesota; Tammy Baldwin, Wisconsin; 1 vacancy	Lamar S. Smith, Ranking Member, Texas; Jim Sensenbrenner, Wisconsin; Howard Coble, North Carolina; Elton Gallegly, California; Bob Goodlatte, Virginia; Steve Chabot, Ohio; Dan Lungren, California; Chris Cannon, Utah; Ric Keller, Florida; Darrell Issa, California; Mike Pence, Indiana; Randy Forbes, Virginia; Steve King, Iowa; Tom Feeney, Florida; Trent Franks, Arizona; Louie Gohmert, Texas; Jim Jordan, Ohio

== See also ==
- Joseph C. Wilson
- Lewis Libby
- Plame affair
- Pardon
- United States v. Libby
- U.S. House Committee on the Judiciary
- Valerie E. Wilson
