= David Addington =

American lawyer (born 1957)

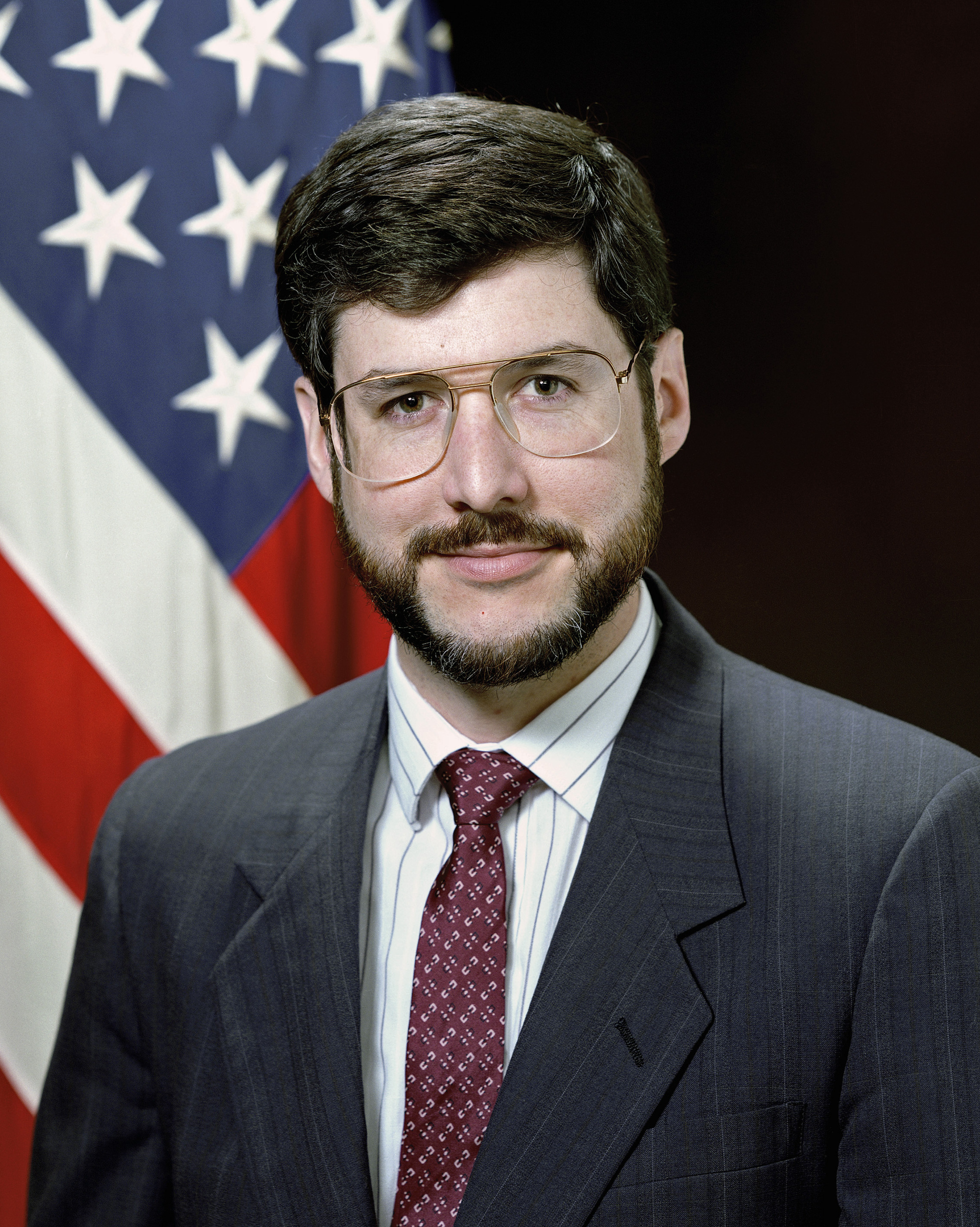
- Addington in 1990

Chief of Staff to the Vice President of the United States
- In office November 1, 2005 – January 20, 2009
- Vice President: Dick Cheney
- Preceded by: Scooter Libby
- Succeeded by: Ron Klain

General Counsel of the Department of Defense
- In office August 12, 1992 – January 20, 1993
- President: George H. W. Bush
- Preceded by: Paul Beach (Acting)
- Succeeded by: John McNeil (Acting)

Personal details
- Born: David Spears Addington; January 22, 1957 (age 69) Washington, D.C., U.S.
- Party: Republican
- Education: Georgetown University (BS); Duke University (JD)

David Spears Addington (born January 22, 1957) is an American lawyer who was legal counsel (2001–2005) and chief of staff (2005–2009) to Vice President Dick Cheney. He was the vice president of domestic and economic policy studies at The Heritage Foundation from 2010 to 2016.

During 21 years of U.S. government service, Addington worked at the Central Intelligence Agency, the Reagan White House, the Department of Defense, four congressional committees, and in the Office of the Vice President. He was appointed to replace I. Lewis "Scooter" Libby Jr. as Cheney's chief of staff after Libby was indicted and forced to resign on charges of perjury and obstruction of justice on October 28, 2005. Addington was described by U.S. News & World Report as "the most powerful man you've never heard of" in May 2006.

== Early life and education ==
Addington was born in Washington, D.C., the first son of Eleanore "Billie" (Flaherty) and the late Jerry Spears Addington, a retired brigadier general and West Point graduate.

The Addington family moved often and there were periods during which Jerry was posted overseas while his family remained stateside. After David's birth in 1957 in Washington, D.C., his father was posted to Carlisle Barracks in Pennsylvania, Camp St. Barbara in South Korea; Colorado Springs, Colorado; Oakdale, Pennsylvania; and Dhahran, Saudi Arabia, where Addington lived during his father's 1967–1969 assignment as chief of the United States Military Training Mission. In this role, the elder Addington, who was promoted to brigadier general in 1965, was responsible for U.S. training and security assistance programs for the Armed Forces of Saudi Arabia. During the family's two-year stay in Saudi Arabia, David Addington (then 10 and 11 years old) was a student at American School Dhahran on the grounds of the U.S. Consulate.

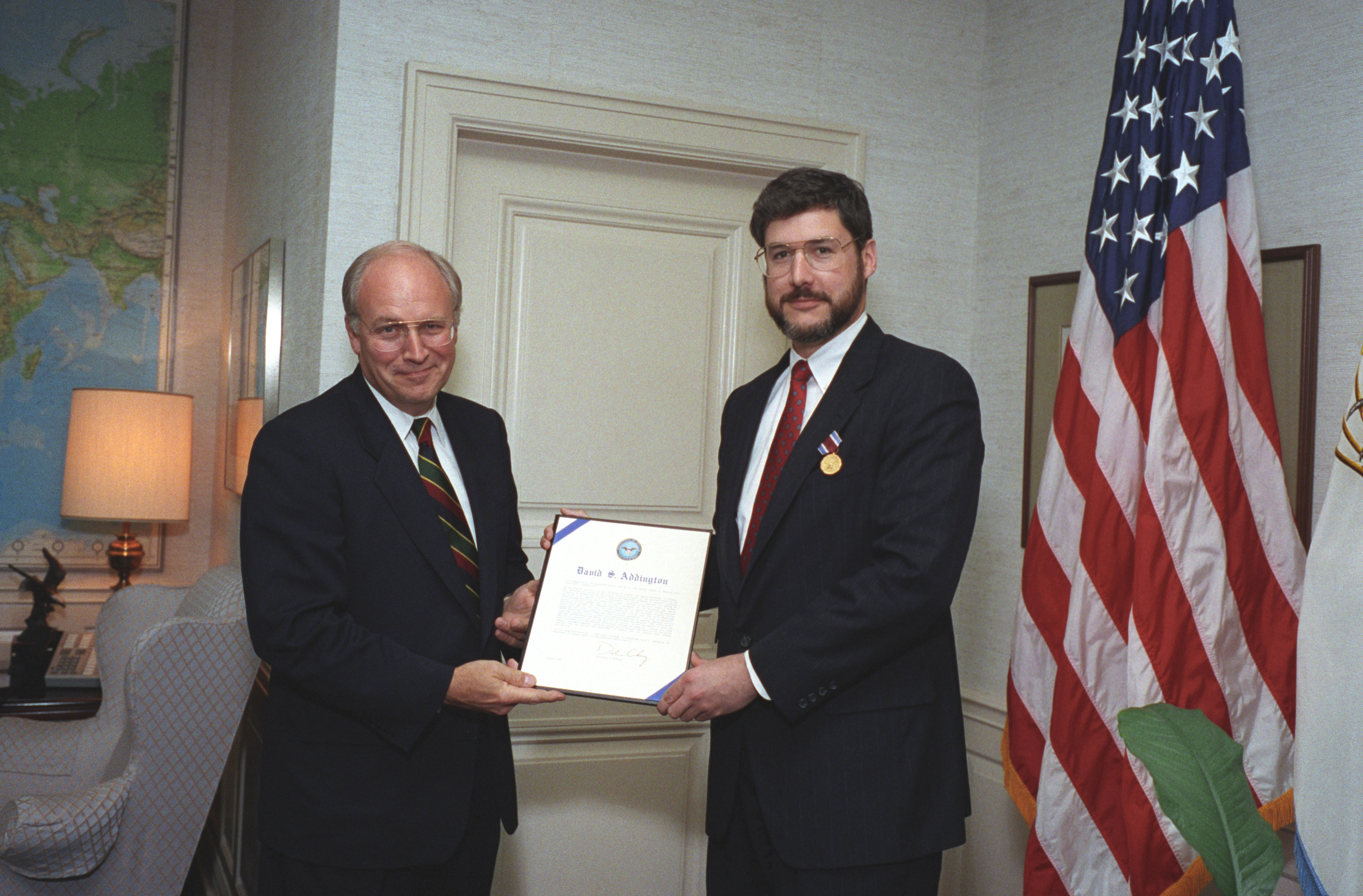
Addington is presented with an award by then defense secretary Dick Cheney in 1992

Addington graduated from Sandia High School in Albuquerque, New Mexico, in May 1974. He was admitted to the United States Naval Academy and attended beginning in fall 1974, but dropped out during his freshman year. Addington took classes at the University of Albuquerque before enrolling at Georgetown University in 1975. He is a May 1978 graduate of the Edmund A. Walsh School of Foreign Service (B.S.F.S., summa cum laude) and holds a Juris Doctor from the Duke University School of Law (May 1981). He was admitted to the bar in both Virginia and the District of Columbia in 1981.

== Career ==
Addington was an assistant general counsel for the Central Intelligence Agency from 1981 to 1984.

From 1984 to 1987 he was counsel for the House committees on intelligence and foreign affairs. He served as a staff attorney on for congressional committees investigating the Iran–Contra affair as an assistant to Congressman Bill Broomfield (R-MI). Books and news articles have said that he was one of the principal authors of a controversial minority report issued at the conclusion of the joint committee's investigation, which "defended President Reagan by claiming it was 'unconstitutional for Congress to pass laws intruding' on the 'commander in chief.'" but in his opening remarks as he testified under subpoena before the House Judiciary Committee, Addington said that he had left the committee's service before the minority report was written and had no role in it.

Addington was also a special assistant for legislative affairs to President Ronald Reagan for one year in 1987, before becoming Reagan's deputy assistant. From 1989 to 1992, Addington served as special assistant to Cheney, who was then the secretary of defense, before being appointed by President George H. W. Bush and confirmed by the Senate as the Department of Defense's general counsel in 1992. In 1993 and 1994, Addington was the Republican staff director of the Senate Intelligence Committee. In 1994 and 1995, he headed a political action committee, the Alliance for American Leadership, set up to support Republican candidates for public office, with a principal focus on being a presidential exploratory committee for Cheney, as the former Defense Secretary contemplated running for the 1996 Republican presidential nomination.

From 1995 to 2001, he worked in private practice, for law firms Baker Donelson and Holland & Knight, and the American Trucking Associations. He also provided extensive assistance to Dick Cheney when the latter was chief executive officer of Halliburton and was in charge of vetting potential presidential running mates for the George W. Bush 2000 presidential campaign, before he was officially his party's nominee for the White House and surprised political observers by choosing Cheney himself to be his running mate.

=== Bush administration ===
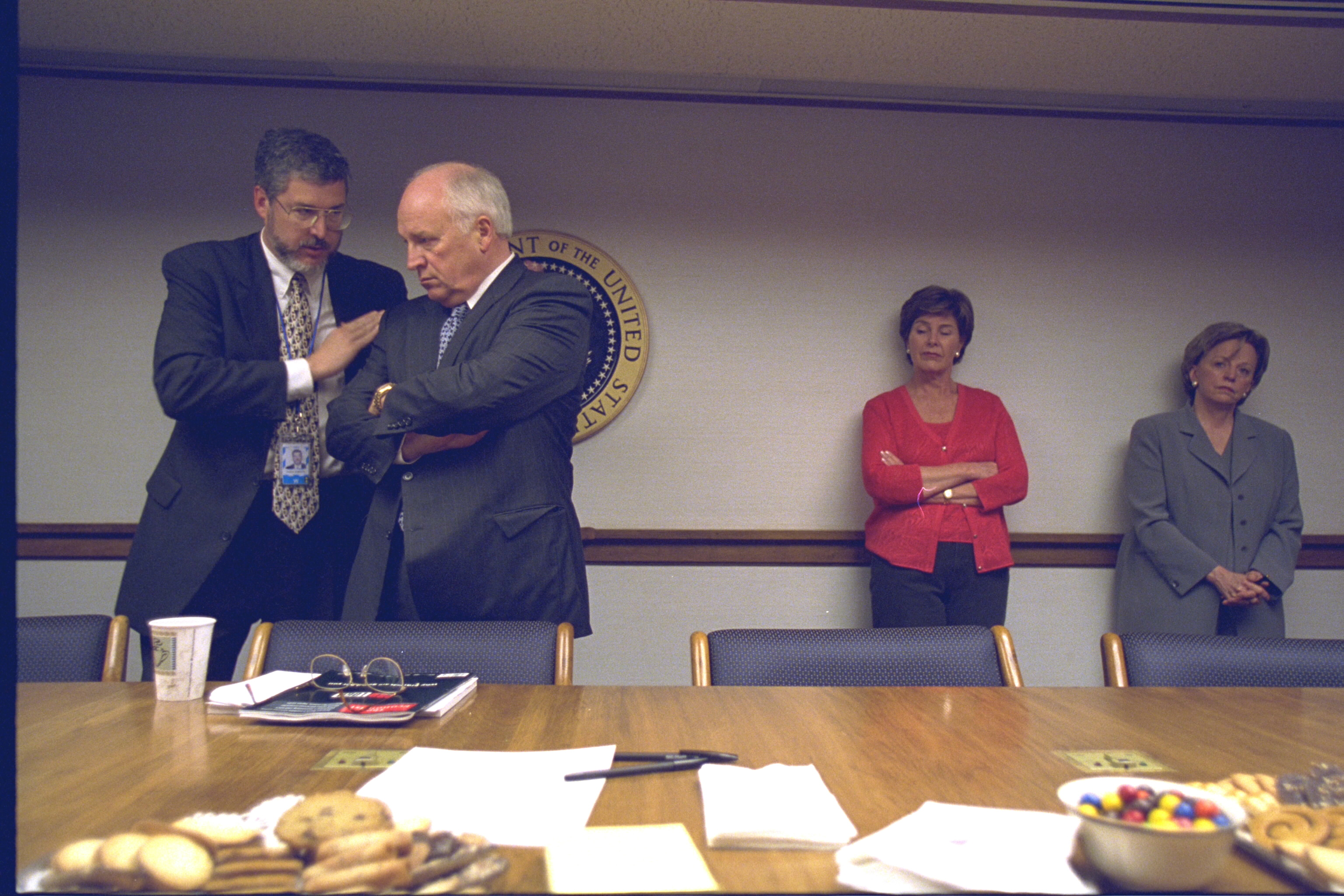
Addington speaking to Vice President Dick Cheney on September 11, 2001, following the September 11 attacks

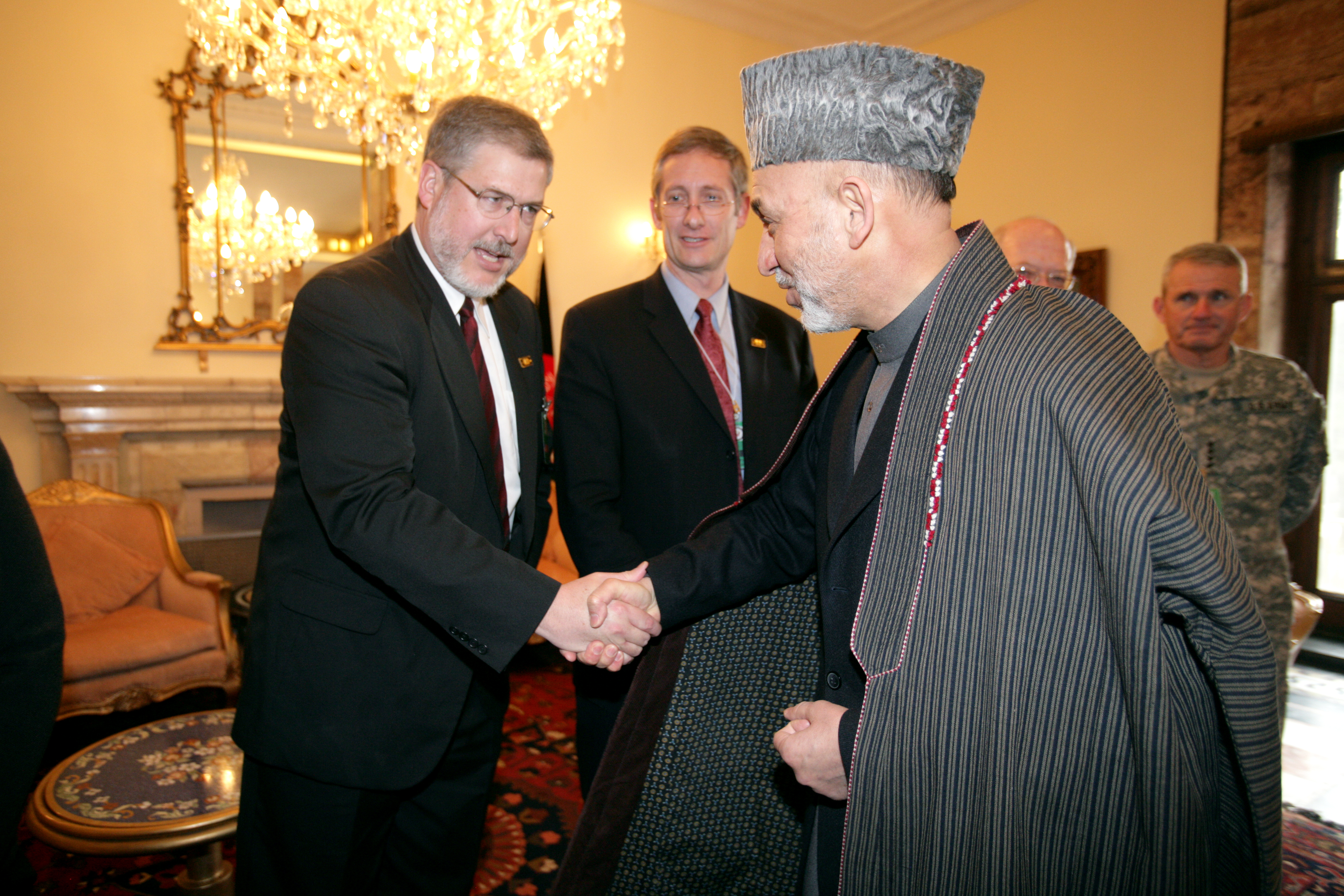
Afghanistan president Hamid Karzai greeting Addington in the Presidential Palace in Kabul in February 2007

As counsel to the vice president, Addington's duties involved protecting the legal interests of the Office of the Vice President. Although limited duties have been given under the Constitution, each vice president has a role in association with the president.

As chief of staff, Addington supervised the vice president's staff. In both roles, Addington also provided advice to the White House staff, as he had the additional role of Assistant to the President, as his predecessor Scooter Libby had likewise held. As vice presidential counsel, Addington is known for his focus on the constitutional independence of the vice president. He tried to protect the inner workings of the Office of the Vice President from investigations by the Government Accountability Office (GAO) and private organizations.

After he began working for Cheney, Addington was influential in multiple policy areas. He provided advice and drafted memoranda on a number of the most controversial policies of the Bush administration. Addington's influence strongly reflects his hawkish views on US foreign policy, a position he had apparently already committed to as a teenager during the late phase of the Vietnam War in the early 1970s. In his House Judiciary Committee testimony, Addington said that he applied three filters in formulating advice on the war on terror: (i) comply with the Constitution, (ii) within the law, maximize the President's options, and (iii) ensure legal protection of military and intelligence personnel engaged in counterterrorism activities.

Addington has consistently advocated that under the Constitution, the president has substantial and expansive powers as commander-in-chief during wartime, if need be. He is the legal force behind over 750 signing statements that President George W. Bush issued when signing bills passed by Congress, expanding the practice relative to other Presidents. Charlie Savage, the former national legal affairs writer for The Boston Globe who won a Pulitzer Prize for his reporting on signing statements, quotes former associate White House counsel Brad Berenson saying that Addington "would dive into a 200-page bill like it was a four-course meal" as he crafted the statements.

A declassified CIA congressional briefing memo of February 4, 2003 states "The (CIA) General Counsel described the process by which the (enhanced interrogation) techniques were approved by a bevy of lawyers from the NSC, the Vice President’s office and the Justice Department," which makes it likely that Addington was aware of the coercive methods if not one or more of the "torture memos" as well, although it is not clear exactly what the CIA memo meant by the word 'approved' as none of the lawyers mentioned was in the chain of command that approves CIA operations and the White House-level lawyers relied on Justice Department legal opinions rather than developing and issuing legal opinions of their own. Press reports have alleged that Addington helped to shape an August 2002 opinion from the Department of Justice's Office of Legal Counsel (OLC) that said torture might be justified in some cases, although John Yoo, author of a number of the "Torture Memos", dismissed the notion of Addington's authorship of Department of Justice memos as "so erroneous as to be laughable."

US Army Colonel Lawrence Wilkerson, who served as Colin Powell's chief of staff when he was Chairman of the Joint Chiefs of Staff—at the same time Addington was Cheney's personal counsel as Secretary of Defense—and then later when Powell was Secretary of State, stated in an in-depth interview regarding extraordinary measures taken post 9/11: "The man who, to me, brings all of this together more than Cheney himself, because he has one foot in the legal camp—and I must admit it's a fairly brilliant foot—and he has one foot in the operator camp, that's David Addington."

Press reports also state that Addington reportedly took a leading role in pressing for the use of torture (so-called "enhanced interrogation techniques") for interrogations when a delegation of top Bush administration attorneys traveled to the Guantanamo Bay detention camp in September 2002 to observe operations there, although Addington said that he could not recall this in his sworn House Judiciary Committee testimony. In congressional testimony, Addington has emphasized that "people out in the field, particularly the folks at the CIA, would not have engaged in their conduct and the head of the CIA would not have ordered them to engage in that conduct without knowing that the Attorney General of the United States or his authorized designee, which is what OLC is, has said this is lawful and they relied on that." The Senate Select Committee on Intelligence released a narrative concerning the Office of Legal Counsel opinions on interrogations on April 17, 2009. The 6,700-page Senate Intelligence Committee report on CIA torture, released in 2016, found the use of torture was both ineffective for gathering intelligence and had damaged America's standing in the world.

Some press reports indicate that Addington advocated scaling back the authority of lawyers in the uniformed services; Addington in fact advocated merely that the civilian general counsels of the military departments be recognized as the chief legal officers of those departments.

Shortly after September 26, 2002, a Gulfstream jet carrying Addington, Alberto Gonzales, CIA attorney John A. Rizzo, William Haynes II, two Justice Department lawyers, Alice S. Fisher and Patrick F. Philbin, and the Office of Legal Counsel's Jack Goldsmith flew to Camp Delta to view the facility that held enemy combatants, including Mohammed al-Qahtani, then to Charleston, South Carolina, to view the facility that held enemy combatants, including José Padilla, and finally to Norfolk, Virginia, where they briefly viewed an enemy combatant on a videoscreen display.

In November 2006, the German government received a complaint seeking the prosecution of Addington and 15 other current and former US government officials for alleged war crimes. The German Prosecutor General at the Federal Supreme Court declined to initiate proceedings on the complaint.

According to Harvard Law School professor Jack Goldsmith, who headed of the Office of Legal Counsel from 2003 to 2004, Addington once said that "we're one bomb away from getting rid of that obnoxious court," referring to the secret United States Foreign Intelligence Surveillance Court, which oversees clandestine wiretapping. Goldsmith also noted that Addington was speaking sarcastically at the time. Washington Post reporter Barton Gellman writes that Addington was the author of the controlling legal and technical documents for the Bush administration's warrantless surveillance program, typing the documents on a Tempest-shielded computer across from his desk in room 268 of the Eisenhower Executive Office Building and storing them in a vault in his office.

Former secretary of state Colin Powell is alleged to have remarked in private, regarding who was responsible for the NSA wiretapping of U.S. citizens without a warrant: "It's Addington," and further, that "he doesn't care about the Constitution." when speaking with friends at a Washington Redskins game. Jack Goldsmith has written that if Powell indeed made this remark, "he was wrong," as Addington and Cheney "seemed to care passionately about the Constitution as they understood it." Michael Kirk, director of the PBS Frontline documentary United States of Secrets, also claims that Addington was responsible for authorizing the NSA's mass surveillance program in his capacity as Vice President Dick Cheney's attorney.

It is alleged, at least during Cheney's term as secretary of defense from 1989 to 1993, that Addington and Cheney were deeply and eagerly interested in the Continuity of Operations Plan (CO-OP), to be used in the event of a nuclear attack on the U.S. (and first partially implemented after 9/11/01). This plan is alleged to provide "enduring Constitutional government" under a "paramount unitary executive" with "cooperation from" Congress and the several Courts. This deep and eager interest in the CO-OP was reported by the New Yorker to extend to drills where Cheney spent his nights in a bunker, perhaps that "secure undisclosed location" which he was said to occupy following 9/11. Apparently Addington has taken this interest to the point where "For years, Addington has carried a copy of the US Constitution in his pocket; taped onto the back are photocopies of extra statutes that detail the legal procedures for presidential succession in times of national emergency ..." perhaps, even a national emergency that involves the CO-OP.

Although press reports state that Addington consistently advocated the expansion of presidential powers and the unitary executive theory, a nearly absolute deference to the executive branch from Congress and the judiciary, Addington stated in his sworn House Judiciary Committee testimony that he intends the term "unitary executive" to refer to the provision of the Constitution that vests all "executive Power" in "a President" rather than in multiple officials or Congress. In a June 26, 2007 letter to Senator John Kerry, Addington asserted that by virtue of Executive Order 12958 as amended in 2003, the Office of the Vice President was exempt from oversight by the National Archives' Information Security Oversight Office for its handling of classified materials, which President George W. Bush confirmed to be the correct interpretation of his revised order. He had previously pushed for elimination of a presidentially-mandated position (as opposed to at the option of the Archivist) of director of the oversight office after a dispute over oversight of classified information. The story was broken after the Chicago Tribune noticed an asterisk in an ISOO report "that it contained no information from OVP." Although a federal district judge initially ordered Addington to submit to a deposition in a lawsuit filed to protect Cheney's vice-presidential records from potential destruction under the provisions of the Presidential Records Act of 1978, the United States Court of Appeals for the District of Columbia Circuit overruled the federal district judge and held that Addington did not have to submit to the deposition.

Addington, along with other officials, was mentioned by title in I. Lewis "Scooter" Libby Jr.'s indictment for five felony charges related to the Plame affair, regarding the leak of the identity of a CIA officer, and he testified at the Libby trial. A PBS Frontline documentary "Cheney's Law" broadcast on October 16, 2007, detailed Addington's key role in Bush administration policy making, and noted that he declined to be interviewed regarding his thoughts on the limits of executive privilege. On June 26, 2008, Addington appeared to testify under subpoena from the House Judiciary Committee along with former Justice Department attorney John Yoo in a contentious hearing on detainee treatment, interrogation methods and the extent of executive branch authority. This testimony was Addington's only public statement during his eight years as Cheney's vice presidential counsel and chief of staff.

Human Rights Watch and The New York Times editorial board have called for the investigation and prosecution of Addington "for conspiracy to torture as well as other crimes."

==== Spanish charges considered ====
In March 2009 Baltasar Garzón, a Spanish judge who has considered international war crimes charges against other high-profile figures, considered whether to allow charges made by Gonzalo Boye to be laid against Addington and five other former officials of the George W. Bush presidency.

Judge Garzon did not dismiss the complaint, but instead ordered the complaint assigned by lottery to another judge, who will then decide whether to pursue the complaint or not. Spanish Attorney General Cándido Conde-Pumpido "strongly criticized" the proceedings, labeling them a legal "artifice." Conde-Pumpido recommended against prosecution due to lack of material responsibility on the part of the American officials.

=== Later career ===
On April 13, 2013, Addington was on a list released by the Russian Federation of Americans banned from entering the country over their alleged human rights violations. The list was a direct response to the so-called Magnitsky list revealed by the United States the day before.

Addington worked as group vice president for research at The Heritage Foundation and as senior vice president, general counsel, and chief legal officer at the National Federation of Independent Business.

== Personal life ==
Addington is married to Cynthia Mary Addington; the couple have three children. Previously, Addington had been married to Linda Werling, whom he met while the two were both attending Duke University.

== In popular culture ==
In the 2018 film Vice, Addington is portrayed by Don McManus. He was also featured in the 2013 documentary, The World According to Dick Cheney, and Turning Point: 9/11 and the War on Terror, a 2021 Netflix documentary series.

Legal offices
Preceded by Paul Beach (Acting)	General Counsel of the Department of Defense; 1992–1993	Succeeded by John McNeil (Acting)
Preceded by Lisa Brown	Legal Counsel to the Vice President of the United States; 2001–2005	Succeeded by Shannen W. Coffin
Political offices
Preceded by Scooter Libby	Chief of Staff to the Vice President of the United States; 2005–2009	Succeeded by Ron Klain
