= National Security Advisor to the Vice President =

White House advisory position

Assistant to the President and National Security Advisor to the Vice President

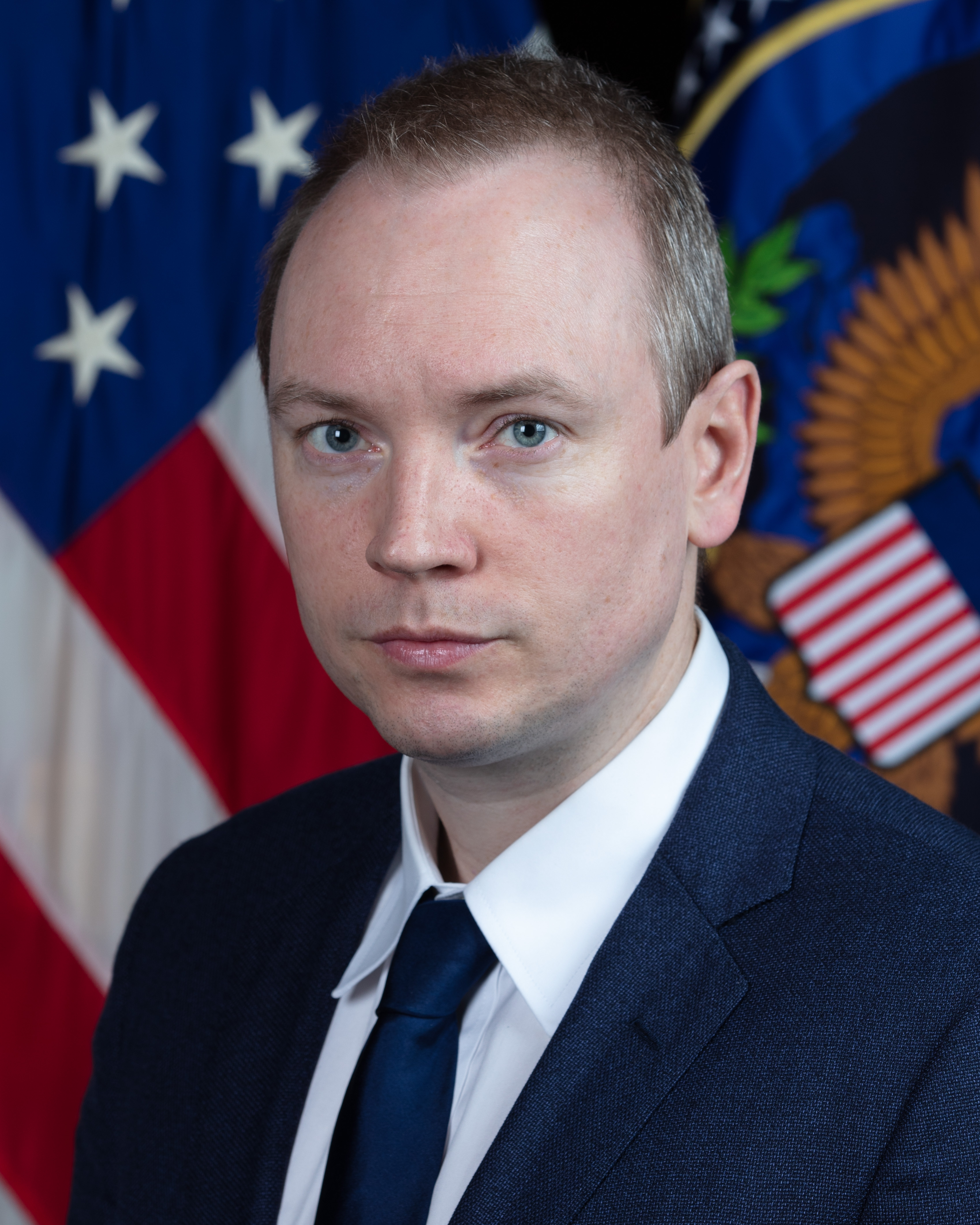
- Incumbent; Cliff Sims since May 13, 2026
- Office of the Vice President of the United States; National Security Office to the Vice President
- Member of: National Security Council; Homeland Security Council
- Reports to: Vice President of the United States
- Appointer: President of the United States
- Constituting instrument: National Security Presidential Memorandum
- Deputy: Deputy National Security Advisor to the Vice President
- Website: WhiteHouse.gov/NSC

Assistant to the President and National Security Advisor to the Vice President role is to advise the Vice President on all matters of national security and provide input to the National Security Council and serves as the primary foreign policy and national security lead in the Office of the Vice President of the United States.

In May 2026, the National Security Advisor to Vice President JD Vance was Cliff Sims.

== List ==
NSA	Vice President	Term start	Term end
Leon Fuerth	Al Gore	January 20, 1993	January 20, 2001
Scooter Libby	Dick Cheney	January 20, 2001	October 28, 2005
John P. Hannah	Dick Cheney	October 28, 2005	January 20, 2009
Antony Blinken	Joe Biden	January 20, 2009	January 20, 2013
Jake Sullivan	Joe Biden	February 26, 2013	August 1, 2014
Colin Kahl	Joe Biden	August 1, 2014	January 26, 2017
Andrea L. Thompson	Mike Pence	January 26, 2017	September 11, 2017
Keith Kellogg	Mike Pence	April 27, 2018	January 20, 2021
Nancy McEldowney	Kamala Harris	January 20, 2021	March 21, 2022
Philip H. Gordon	Kamala Harris	March 21, 2022	January 20, 2025
Andy Baker	JD Vance	January 20, 2025	May 23, 2025
Cliff Sims	JD Vance	May 13, 2026	Incumbent
