= The Apprentice (Libby novel) =

Novel by Lewis "Scooter" Libby

- Author: Lewis Libby
- Language: English
- Genre: Thriller
- Publisher: Graywolf Press; St. Martin's Thomas Dunne Books; St. Martin's Griffin
- Publication date: August 1996 (Graywolf); rpt. February 2002 (Thomas Dunne Books); December 2005 (Griffin)
- Publication place: United States
- Media type: Print (hardback; trade paperback; paperback)
- Pages: 239 pp. and 256 pp. [various]
- ISBN: 978-1-55597-245-5
- OCLC: 35254119
- Dewey Decimal: 813/.54 21
- LC Class: PS3562.I163 A86 1996

The Apprentice is a novel by Lewis Libby, former Chief of Staff to United States Vice President Dick Cheney, first published in hardback in 1996, reprinted in trade paperback in 2002, and reissued in mass market paperback in 2005 after Libby's indictment in the CIA leak grand jury investigation. It is set in northern Japan in winter 1903, and centers on a group of travelers stranded at a remote inn due to a smallpox epidemic. It has been described as "a thriller ... that includes references to bestiality, pedophilia and rape." It is the first and only novel that Libby has written.

== Publication history ==
After being published in hardback by Graywolf Press (St. Paul, Minnesota) in August 1996 (now out of print), it was published as a trade paperback by St. Martin's Thomas Dunne Books in February 2002, and then reissued as a mass market paperback reprint of 25,000 copies by St. Martin's Griffin imprint in December 2005, after Libby's indictment that October, as a result of the CIA leak grand jury investigation.

== First edition publicity ==
In 2002, during an interview on Larry King Live promoting his novel's first publication in paperback, King asked Libby: "Are you a novelist working part-time for the vice president?" Libby told King, "Well, I've never quite figured that out. ... I'm a great fan of the Vice President. I think he's one of the smartest, most honorable people I've ever met. So, I'd like to consider myself fully on his team, but there's always a novel kicking around in the back somewhere." After hearing a brief plot summary, King wondered why Libby had set the novel in Japan, and Libby responded:

I first wrote it in Japan -- contemporary Japan -- in college for a credit. Had a good reason -- I wanted to graduate. ... But the story sort of wouldn't let me go, and I sort of said, why am I writing about -- this about Japan? ... And I went back and rewrote the book entirely in New England -- set in New England. Went out to Colorado, drank tequila and wrote. And sort of the dream life. ... But what eventually happened was, that didn't seem right. I took that 300 pages and threw it away, never showed it. [KING: It's a classic first novel.] ... And then I started to think, you know, what I need is more distance for the characters, more sort of isolation. I wanted a land before telephones, before fingerprints -- give the reader even a greater sense [of isolation].

At that time, Libby also appeared on The Diane Rehm Show on National Public Radio to talk about the novel. Libby said that he had chosen to set the novel in Japan in 1903, because it was a pivotal time in its history that had intrigued him.

== Plot summary ==
According to the description of the book by St. Martin's Press:

The Apprentice takes place in a remote mountain inn in northernmost Japan, where a raging blizzard has brought together wayfarers who share only fear and suspicion of one another. It is the winter of 1903, the country is beset with smallpox and war is brewing with Russia.

In the flickering shadows of the crowded room, the apprentice, charged with running the inn during the owner's absence, finds himself strongly attracted to one of the performers lodged there. His involvement with the mysterious travelers plunges him headlong into murder, passion and heart-stopping chases through the snow.

== Reprint publicity ==
Following his indictment on October 28, 2005, for obstruction of justice, perjury, and making false statements to federal investigators in Special Counsel Patrick Fitzgerald's CIA leak grand jury investigation, relating to the Plame affair, after the novel was reissued and promoted by its publisher and Libby in media interviews and the subject of subsequent reviews, it gained renewed attention.

Notably, The Apprentice and Lewis Libby were the focus of the following week's New Yorker "Talk of the Town" column, by Lauren Collins, entitled "Scooter's Sex Shocker". Observing that "Libby has a lot to live up to as a conservative author of erotic fiction," Collins compares the novel to other so-called "sex shockers" written by conservative politicians and pundits and discusses themes of homoeroticism and incest in The Apprentice. She documents her view that "Like his predecessors, Libby does not shy from the scatological" with quotations from the book, regarding it as "Libby’s 1996 entry in the long and distinguished annals of the right-wing dirty novel."

== Reception ==
Although the sexual passages and references make up only a few pages of the novel, one passage in particular — combining bestiality, pedophilia, prostitution, biastophilia, and voyeurism in just three sentences—has received wide attention:

Then the young samurai's mother had the child sold to a brothel, where she swept the floors and oiled the women and watched the secret ways. At age ten the madam put the child in a cage with a bear trained to couple with young girls so the girls would be frigid and not fall in love with their patrons. They fed her through the bars and aroused the bear with a stick when it seemed to lose interest. Groups of men paid to watch. Like other girls who have been trained this way, she learned to handle many men in a single night and her skin turned a milky white.

Another sentence in the book introduces necrophilia in addition to bestiality, as a hunter copulates with a freshly killed deer: "The man called out to the others that the deer was still warm. He asked if they should fuck the deer" (127).

In his June 7, 2007 Wall Street Journal op-ed calling for Presidential pardon of Scooter Libby, conservative academic Fouad Ajami praised The Apprentice as a "remarkably lyrical novel ... [which] bears witness to an eye for human folly and disappointment."
