= Office of the Second Lady or Second Gentleman of the United States =

Executive office supporting the Second Lady or Second Gentleman of the United States

Office of the Second Lady
Office overview
- Formed: 1970s
- Jurisdiction: Federal government of the United States
- Headquarters: Number One Observatory Circle, Washington, D.C.
- Office executives: Usha Vance, Second lady of the United States; Shannon Fisher, Chief of Staff to the Second Lady
- Parent department: Office of the Vice President of the United States

The Office of the Second Lady or Second Gentleman of the United States is an administrative office under the Executive Office of the President of the United States that supports the official duties of the Second Lady or Second Gentleman of the United States.

== Key Staff ==
- Chief of Staff: Shannon Fisher
- Director of Communications: Nicole Reeves
- Special Assistant: Addison Osborne Logan
- Special Assistant: David Mark Swegle (former; January–March 2026)
- Scheduling Director: Shelby McKee Boone
- Deputy Policy Director: James R. Lloyd
- Operations Manager: Martha Ellen Phillips
- Executive Assistant to the Chief of Staff: Anna Beth Craig

== See also ==
- Second Lady or Second Gentleman of the United States
- Office of the Vice President of the United States
- Executive Office of the President of the United States
- Vice President of the United States
