= Yellowhammer News =

Conservative news site in Alabama, United States

Yellowhammer News is an American conservative website that publishes news and political commentary pertaining to Alabama. It is owned by Yellowhammer Media.

The name comes from the Northern flicker, also called the "yellowhammer" (not to be confused with the European bird of the same name), which is the Alabama state bird.

== History ==
It was founded in 2011 by Alabama native Cliff Sims, who left in January 2017 to work in President Donald Trump's administration as assistant communications director for White House messaging, as well as a special assistant to Trump himself. (Sims left that job after 17 months and wrote the memoir Team of Vipers about the experience.) When he left Yellowhammer, Sims sold the company to Tim Howe and John Ross, both former directors of the Alabama Republican Party.

In 2023, Alabama political affairs consultant Paul Shashy and businessman Thomas Harris acquired Yellowhammer News and its related media affiliates from Howe and Ross. These affiliates include YHN Radio Network, 256 Today News, and Soul Grown.
