= Team of Vipers =

2019 memoir by Cliff Sims

- Author: Cliff Sims
- Subject: Trump Administration
- Genre: Memoir
- Publisher: Thomas Dunne Books
- Publication date: January 29, 2019
- Publication place: United States
- Media type: Print, e-book, audiobook
- Pages: 384
- ISBN: 978-1250223890 (Hardcover)
- OCLC: 1082864961

Team of Vipers: My 500 Extraordinary Days in the Trump White House is a book-length memoir written by former Trump administration Special Assistant to the President and Director of Message Strategy Cliff Sims who had previously operated the conservative Alabama news site Yellowhammer News. Team of Vipers was released on January 29, 2019. Sims worked on Trump's presidential campaign and then in the White House communications office from January 2017 to May 2018. The White House said Sims was fired, while he said he left to find work in "a really strong team environment".

On January 29, 2019, President Donald Trump tweeted that the book is "boring" and "fiction" and that Sims was a "low level staffer" who "pretended to be an insider when in fact he was nothing more than a gofer". Trump's campaign committee announced that same day that it was planning to sue Sims for violating a non-disclosure agreement. The Trump White House routinely required staff to sign non-disclosure agreements, though Sims said he did not remember whether he signed one. Legal observers said that Sims' experiences while a federal employee could not be covered by a non-disclosure agreement.

In February 2019, Sims filed a civil suit against Trump in his official capacity as president for allegedly attempting to enforce a nondisclosure agreement that Sims may have signed upon joining the Trump administration. Sims contends his book contained only information he gained as an employee of the federal government and hence any nondisclosure agreement is unenforceable and violates his First Amendment rights. After a short legal dispute, Trump realized that the book actually put him in a positive light while criticizing senior staff. As a result, the suits were dropped and Sims has remained a close ally to the Trump family.

In August 2020, it was reported by several outlets that Sims was once again working for the Trump administration, performing speech writing duties for the 2020 Republican National Convention. In October 2020, it was reported that he had rejoined the Trump administration as a senior adviser to the director of national intelligence.
