= Trial of Scooter Libby =

Trial for interference with Plame affair

United States v. Libby
- Court: United States District Court for the District of Columbia
- Full case name: United States of America v. I. Lewis Libby, also known as "Scooter" Libby
- Defendant: Scooter Libby
- Prosecution: Patrick Fitzgerald
- Citation: Docket no. 1:2005-cr-00394-RBW

Court membership
- Judge sitting: Reggie Walton

I. Lewis "Scooter" Libby, a former high-ranking official in the George W. Bush administration, was put on trial in 2007 for interfering with special prosecutor Patrick Fitzgerald's criminal investigation of the Plame affair.

Libby served as Assistant to the President under George W. Bush and Chief of Staff to the Vice President of the United States and Assistant to the Vice President for National Security Affairs under Dick Cheney from 2001 to 2005. Libby resigned from his government positions hours after his indictment on October 28, 2005.

Libby was indicted by a federal grand jury on five felony counts of making false statements to federal investigators, perjury for lying to a federal grand jury, and obstruction of justice for impeding the course of a federal grand jury investigation. The case was concerned with the possibly illegal leaking by government officials of the classified identity of Valerie Plame Wilson, a covert agent of the CIA. She was also the wife of former Ambassador Joseph C. Wilson IV. Pursuant to the subsequent trial, Libby was convicted on March 6, 2007, on four counts of perjury, obstruction of justice, and making false statements. He was acquitted of one count of making false statements.

Libby was sentenced to 30 months in prison and fined $250,000. The sentence was commuted in June 2007 by President Bush, voiding the prison term. The convictions no longer stand on the record because Libby was pardoned by President Donald Trump on April 13, 2018.

On April 3, 2007, the District of Columbia Bar suspended Libby's license to practice law in Washington, D.C., and recommended his disbarment pending his appeal of his conviction. On March 20, 2008, after he dropped his appeal, he was disbarred by the District of Columbia Court of Appeals, in Washington, D.C., at least until 2012.

He delayed reinstatement until June 2016, when he successfully petitioned the court for reinstatement. He was readmitted to the D.C. bar on November 3, 2016.

In the District of Columbia Court of Appeals Disciplinary Counsel's Report reinstating Libby's law license, the Counsel noted that Libby had continued to assert his innocence. As a result, the Counsel had to "undertake a more complex evaluation of a Petition for reinstatement" than when a petitioner admits guilt. But the Counsel found that "Libby has presented credible evidence in support of his version of events and it appears that one key prosecution witness [sic], Judith Miller, has changed her recollection of the events in question." The reference to Judith Miller, a former New York Times reporter, involved her memoir, The Story, A Reporter's Journey. In the book, Miller said she read Plame's memoir and discovered that Plame's cover was at the State Department, a fact Miller said the prosecution had withheld from her. In rereading what she called her "elliptical" notes (meaning hard to decipher), she realized they were about Plame's cover, not her job at the CIA. She concluded that her testimony that Libby had told her Plame worked at the CIA was wrong. "Had I helped convict an innocent man?" she asked. Miller went on to note that John Rizzo, a former CIA general counsel, had said in his memoir that there was no evidence that the outing of Plame had caused any damage to CIA operations or agents, including Plame. That statement rebuts the prosecution's closing argument that as a result of the disclosure of Plame's identity, a CIA operative could be "arrested, tortured, or killed."

== Events leading up to the trial ==
=== The Plame affair ===
The Plame affair ensued after the identity of Valerie Plame was leaked to journalists, which took place after her husband Joseph Wilson criticized the Bush administration's rationale for the Iraq War on July 6, 2003 by publicly stating that he had found no evidence for the claim that Saddam Hussein's regime had attempted to buy yellowcake uranium in Niger (a claim that first emerged due to the Niger uranium forgeries) in a New York Times op-ed entitled "What I Didn't Find in Africa".

Wilson had been sent on a fact-finding mission to Niger but had found no evidence for the claim that Iraq had been attempting to buy yellowcake uranium in Africa, as part of an active weapons of mass destruction program. Nonetheless, this claim was repeated by president Bush during the Iraq disarmament crisis that preceded the Iraq War. President Bush's controversial "16 words" in his 2003 State of the Union Address alluded to the Niger claim: "The British government has learned that Saddam Hussein recently sought significant quantities of uranium from Africa." Bush's claim was apparently based on the forged uranium documents. On March 7, 2003, 11 days before the United States-led coalition invasion of Iraq, the International Atomic Energy Agency (IAEA) released its report determining that documents indirectly cited by President Bush as suggesting that Iraq had tried to buy 500 tons of uranium from Niger were actually "obvious" forgeries.

On July 14, 2003, a newspaper column commenting on Wilson's claims written by Robert Novak, entitled "Mission to Niger", disclosed Plame's name and status as an "operative" who worked in a CIA division on the proliferation of weapons of mass destruction. Wilson, her husband, stated in various interviews and subsequent writings (as listed in his 2004 memoir The Politics of Truth) that his wife's identity was covert and that members of the administration knowingly revealed it as retribution for his op-ed entitled "What I Didn't Find in Africa", published in The New York Times on July 6, 2003. Some argue that his wife's employment at the CIA was no longer classified: Victoria Toensing, who helped craft the Intelligence Identities Protection Act, claims in her Washington Post opinion piece "The Plame Game: Was This a Crime?" that since Valerie Plame had not held a foreign post for over five years, she no longer qualified for covert status.

On September 26, 2003, at the request of the CIA, the Department of Justice and the FBI began a criminal investigation into the possible unauthorized disclosure of classified information regarding Valerie Wilson's CIA affiliation to various reporters in the spring of 2003. During this ongoing federal inquiry "into the alleged unauthorized disclosure of a CIA employee's identity," a possible violation of criminal statutes, including the Intelligence Identities Protection Act of 1982, and Title 18, United States Code, Section 793, Libby testified to FBI agents and to the grand jury.

Libby was charged with lying to FBI agents and to the grand jury about two conversations with reporters, Tim Russert of NBC News and Matthew Cooper of Time magazine. According to the Indictment, the obstruction of justice count alleges that while testifying under oath before the grand jury on March 5 and March 24, 2004, Libby knowingly and corruptly endeavored to influence, obstruct and impede the grand jury's investigation by misleading and deceiving the grand jury as to when, and the manner and means by which, he acquired, and subsequently disclosed to the media, information concerning the employment of Valerie Wilson by the CIA.

== CIA grand jury investigation ==
On December 30, 2003, Patrick J. Fitzgerald was named Special Counsel by Deputy Attorney General James B. Comey and charged with conducting the investigation into the Plame affair. Fitzgerald was granted the full plenary power of the Attorney General in the Libby case, as clarified by Comey in letters of February 6, 2004, and August 12, 2005.

On October 28, 2005, after twenty-two months of investigation, a federal grand jury indicted Libby in the United States District Court for the District of Columbia. On November 3, 2005, Libby appeared at his arraignment before Judge Reggie B. Walton and pleaded not guilty.

The text of the filed indictment includes: one count of obstruction of justice (Title 18, United States Code, section 1503) for impeding the grand jury's investigation; two counts of perjury (18 USC §1623) for lying under oath before the grand jury on March 5 and March 24, 2005; and two counts of making false statements (18 USC §1001(a)(2)) and in connection with for making "materially false and intentionally misleading statements" to FBI agents who interviewed him on October 14 and November 26, 2004.

Journalist David Corn speculated that Libby was using graymail as a defense tactic, based on the large amount of classified material that was requested by his defense and the addition of the graymail expert John D. Cline to his defense team.

On February 3, 2006, Walton set a trial date of January 8, 2007.

On February 3, 2006, the defense subpoenaed The New York Times, its former reporter Judith Miller, who had been jailed for 85 days after refusing to tell the grand jury about conversations she had with Libby, Time magazine and its reporter Matthew Cooper, and Tim Russert of NBC News for documents related to the Plame affair. According to Pete Yost of the Associated Press, the subpoenaed reporters and organizations would have until April 7 to turn over the material or challenge the subpoenas:

The subpoena to Miller seeks her notes and other materials, including documents concerning Plame prepared by Miller and Times columnist Nicholas D. Kristof.

Kristof wrote the first account of the criticism that Plame's husband was leveling at the Bush administration. Referring to Plame's husband, though not by name, a May 6, 2003, Times column by Kristof raised the possibility the Bush administration might have disregarded prewar intelligence suggesting Iraq did not have weapons of mass destruction.

Three weeks after Kristof's column appeared, Libby started making inquiries at the State Department about the unnamed envoy in Kristof's column, according to the indictment.

The subpoena to the Times also calls for:

- Documents of contacts between any Times employee and any of eight people, including then-CIA Director George Tenet and then-White House spokesman Ari Fleischer, regarding Joe Wilson.
- Documents concerning a recent Vanity Fair article in which Miller said she talked to many people in the government about Plame.
- Drafts of a personal account by Miller, published in the Times, about her grand jury testimony.
- Documents regarding Miller's interactions with a Times editor in which Miller may have been told to pursue a story about Joe Wilson and a trip he made to Niger on behalf of the CIA.

On February 9, 2006, Murray Waas reported in The National Journal that Libby had testified to the grand jury that he had been authorized by his superiors to disclose classified information regarding intelligence estimates of Iraq's weapons programs. Waas identified Vice President Cheney as one such superior on the basis of unpublished statements of lawyers with knowledge of the situation and documents that Waas says were filed with the court.

On February 23, 2006, Libby's attorneys filed a motion to dismiss the indictment against him. According to Toni Locy, reporting for the Associated Press, "The defense attorneys ... said Fitzgerald's appointment violated federal law because his investigation was not supervised by the attorney general." Libby's attorneys argued that only the U.S. Congress can approve such an arrangement," and that the appointment of Fitzgerald as Special Counsel by then-United States Deputy Attorney General James B. Comey, himself acting as Attorney General in Ashcroft's place, violated the Appointments Clause (United States Constitution, Article II § 2).

On April 5, 2006, court filings distributed widely in the press and news media the next day, revealed that Libby had testified during the grand jury investigation about information that Vice President Cheney and President Bush had authorized disclosing; reportedly, the original intent of the filing was to restrict Libby's access to further classified information in defense discovery.

A court filing by Libby's defense team argued that Valerie Plame was not foremost on the minds of administration officials as they sought to rebut charges made by her husband, Joseph Wilson, that the White House manipulated intelligence to make a case for invasion. The filing indicates that Libby's lawyers don't intend to say he was told to reveal Plame's identity.

On May 24, 2006, Fitzgerald filed a response to a motion by Libby's lawyers, offering summaries of Libby's grand jury testimony and excerpts from Libby's testimony of March 5, 2004 and March 24, 2004.

On September 22, 2006, according to Matt Apuzzo for the Associated Press, Libby's attorney's reported that "Libby Plans to Testify in CIA Leak Trial", United States v. Libby, in his own defense.

== Overview of the trial and the presidential commutation ==
The trial in the case of the United States of America v. I. Lewis Libby began on January 16, 2007. On March 6, Libby was convicted of four out of the five counts against him. He was found guilty of two counts of perjury in testimony before a federal grand jury, one count of obstruction of justice in a federal grand jury investigation, and one of two counts of making false statements to federal investigators. He was acquitted on the second count of making false statements (indictment count three).

The jury rendered its verdict at noon on March 6, 2007. It convicted Libby on four of the five counts against him—two counts of perjury, one count of obstructing justice in a grand jury investigation, and one of the two counts of making false statements to federal investigators—and acquitted him on one count of making false statements.

Initially, Libby's lawyers announced that they would be seeking a new trial but that, if they were not to get one, they would appeal Libby's conviction. Later they decided not to seek a new trial, but they still plan to appeal Libby's conviction. On June 5, 2007, Judge Reggie Walton sentenced Libby to 30 months in federal prison, a fine of $250,000, and two years of supervised release, including 400 hours of community service. Libby appealed Judge Reggie Walton's subsequent order that he report to prison pending the appeal of his conviction. Two weeks later he lost that appeal.

President Bush commuted Libby's sentence on July 2, 2007, eliminating the prison term while not changing the other parts and their conditions. Judge Walton queried aspects of that presidential commutation.

=== Sentencing of Libby ===
Given current federal sentencing guidelines, which are not mandatory, if he had been convicted on all five counts, Libby's sentence could have ranged from no imprisonment to imprisonment of up to 25 years and a fine of $US1,000,000. Given those non-binding guidelines, according to lawyer, author, New Yorker staff writer, and CNN senior legal analyst Jeffrey Toobin on Anderson Cooper 360°, the sentence based on Libby's conviction on four counts could have been between "one and a half to three years."

The United States Government was seeking a 30 to 37-month sentence according to the sentencing guidelines memorandum filed in court by prosecutor Fitzgerald. On June 5, 2007, Libby was sentenced to thirty months in prison and fined $250,000. According to Apuzzo and Yost, the judge also "placed him on two years probation [supervised release] after his prison sentence expires. There is no parole in the federal system, but Libby would be eligible for [supervised] release after two years."

=== Libby ordered to jail pending appeal ===
According to CNN News, "After the June 5 sentencing, [Judge] Walton said he was inclined to jail Libby after the defense laid out its proposed appeal, but the judge told attorneys he was open to changing his mind"; however, on June 14, 2007, Judge Walton "ordered" Libby "to report to prison while his attorneys appeal his perjury and obstruction." Although "Libby's attorneys asked that the order be stayed ... U.S. District Court Judge Reggie Walton denied the request and told Vice President Dick Cheney's former chief of staff that he has 10 days to appeal the ruling"; in denying Libby's request, which had questioned Special Counsel Patrick Fitzgerald's "authority to charge Libby," as quoted by CNN, Judge Walton said: "'Everyone is accountable, and if you work in the White House, and if it's perceived that somehow (you're) linked at the hip, the American public would have serious questions about the fairness of any investigation of a high-level official conducted by the attorney general,'" supporting Fitzgerald's authority in the case. The judge was also responding to an Amicus curiae brief that he had permitted to be filed, which had not apparently convinced him to change his mind, as he subsequently denied Libby bail during his appeal. Prior to Judge Walton's order, Josh Gerstein stated, in The New York Sun, "Bail remains a critical question for Libby. Judge Walton has indicated he is not inclined to grant it. Many political observers believe that if Libby gets bail and his appeals fail, he stands a better chance of receiving a presidential pardon because President Bush's term will be nearing its end. Technically, the scholars took no position on the question of bail, but if Judge Walton agreed with them [i.e., their arguments], bail would be highly likely." Though "Judge Walton granted the scholars permission to file their brief," Gerstein reports, "his order doing so contained a caustic footnote questioning the motivation of the legal academics and suggesting he might not give a great deal of weight to their opinion[:]

It is an impressive show of public service when twelve prominent and distinguished current and former law professors are able to amass their collective wisdom in the course of only several days to provide their legal expertise to the court on behalf of a criminal defendant," the judge wrote. "The Court trusts that this is a reflection of these eminent academics' willingness in the future to step to the plate and provide like assistance in cases involving any of the numerous litigants, both in this Court and throughout the courts of this nation, who lack the financial means to fully and properly articulate the merits of their legal positions even in instances where failure to do so could result in monetary penalties, incarceration, or worse. The Court will certainly not hesitate to call for such assistance from these luminaries, as necessary in the interests of justice and equity, whenever similar questions arise in the cases that come before it."

Noting that "Libby is the first sitting White House official to be indicted in 130 years," CNN News also reported that "At the beginning of Thursday's [June 5, 2007] hearing, Walton told the court that he had received 'harassing' and 'hateful' messages[:] 'In the interest of full disclosure, I have received a number of harassing, angry and mean-spirited phone calls and messages. Some wishing bad things on me and my family,' the judge said. 'Those types of things will have no impact. ... I initially threw them away, but then there were more, some that were more hateful,' Walton said. 'They are being kept.'"

Jeffrey Toobin, CNN's senior legal analyst, "called the ruling 'a very dramatic and, to me, surprising decision,'" since, he pointed out, "'Many white collar defendants get bail pending appeal,' ... citing Martha Stewart and some insider traders as examples" and concluding: "'Judge Walton has had it with Scooter Libby,' who, Toobin said, also got a stiff sentence for his crimes in the first place. 'This is going to put President Bush in a very difficult position regarding the question of a pardon.'"

New York Times reporter Neil Lewis estimated subsequently that Libby's prison sentence could begin within "two months," explaining that

Judge Walton's decision means that the defense lawyers will probably ask a federal appeals court to block the sentence, a long-shot move. It also sharpens interest in a question being asked by Mr. Libby's supporters and critics alike: Will President Bush pardon Mr. Libby? ... So far, the president has expressed sympathy for Mr. Libby and his family but has not tipped his hand on the pardon issue. ... If the president does not pardon him, and if an appeals court refuses to second-guess Judge Walton's decision, Mr. Libby will probably be ordered to report to prison in six to eight weeks' time. Federal prison authorities will decide where. "Unless the Court of Appeals overturns my ruling, he will have to report," Judge Walton said.

On June 20, 2007, Libby appealed Walton's ruling in federal appeals court. The next day, Judge Walton filed a 30-page expanded ruling, in which he explained his decision to deny Libby bail in more detail.

On July 2, 2007, according to Cary O'Reilly (Bloomberg News) and other news media, "the U.S. Court of Appeals for the D.C. Circuit ... [unanimously] denied his request for release. The decision will increase pressure on President George W. Bush to decide soon whether to pardon Libby, 56, as the former White House official's supporters have urged."

=== Presidential pardon and clemency issues ===
Soon after the verdict, calls for Libby to be pardoned by President George W. Bush began to appear in some newspapers; some of them are posted online by the Libby Legal Defense Trust. U.S. Senate Majority Leader Harry Reid issued a press release about the verdict, urging President Bush to pledge not to pardon Libby, and other Democratic politicians followed his lead.

Surveying "the pardon battle" and citing both pro and con publications, The Washington Post online columnist Dan Froomkin concludes that many U.S. newspapers opposed a presidential pardon for Libby. In an op-ed published in The Washington Post, former federal prosecutor William Otis argues that the sentence is too stringent and that, instead of pardoning Libby, President Bush should commute his sentence.

After the sentencing, President Bush stated on camera: "[I] will not intervene until Libby's legal team has exhausted all of its avenues of appeal ... It wouldn't be appropriate for me to discuss the case until after the legal remedies have run its course."

== Presidential commutation of Libby's prison sentence ==
After denial of Libby's bond by the U.S. Court of Appeals for the D.C. Circuit, President Bush commuted the prison term portion of Libby's sentence on July 2, 2007, leaving in place the felony conviction, the $250,000 fine, and the terms of probation (supervised release).

The President's commutation statement states (in part):

Mr. Libby was sentenced to thirty months of prison, two years of probation, and a $250,000 fine. In making the sentencing decision, the district court rejected the advice of the probation office, which recommended a lesser sentence and the consideration of factors that could have led to a sentence of home confinement or probation. I respect the jury's verdict. But I have concluded that the prison sentence given to Mr. Libby is excessive. Therefore, I am commuting the portion of Mr. Libby's sentence that required him to spend thirty months in prison. My decision to commute his prison sentence leaves in place a harsh punishment for Mr. Libby.

When Keith Olbermann interviewed former Ambassador Joseph C. Wilson, the husband of Valerie Plame, on the MSNBC television program Countdown with Keith Olbermann on the night of July 2, 2007, Joe Wilson expressed his and others' outrage:

There is nothing this administration does that shocks me anymore—it is corrupt from top to bottom. ... American citizens were outraged that the president of the United States would short circuit the rule of law and the system of justice. ... We know in America the difference between right and wrong, even if this administration doesn't.

Wilson repeated his complaint that the President's action and others' actions leading to Bush's commutation of Libby's sentence could seriously damage United States national security by harming its intelligence capability—"for the CIA, its covert officers, and for the agents that are recruited by officers, those who would put their lives at risk in order to obtain the intelligence we need will think long and hard about it when they see that the administration with impunity will betray its covert officers, will engage in treason."

On the following evening, in his "Special Comment," Olbermann called for both President Bush and Vice-President Cheney to resign.

Prosecutor Patrick Fitzgerald objected to President Bush's characterizing Libby's sentence as "excessive," stating:

We fully recognize that the Constitution provides that commutation decisions are a matter of presidential prerogative and we do not comment on the exercise of that prerogative. We comment only on the statement in which the President termed the sentence imposed by the judge as "excessive." The sentence in this case was imposed pursuant to the laws governing sentencings which occur every day throughout this country. In this case, an experienced federal judge considered extensive argument from the parties and then imposed a sentence consistent with the applicable laws. It is fundamental to the rule of law that all citizens stand before the bar of justice as equals. That principle guided the judge during both the trial and the sentencing.

The day after the commuting of Libby's sentence, James Rowley (Bloomberg News) reported that President Bush has not ruled out pardoning Libby in the future and that Bush's press spokesman, Tony Snow, denied any political motivation in the commutation. Quoting Snow, Rowley added: "'The president is getting pounded on the right because he didn't do a full pardon.' If Bush were 'doing the weather-vane thing' he 'would have done something differently.'"

Nevertheless, that evening CNN reported that, pursuant to widespread criticism by Democratic leaders and other Democratic politicians, Representative John Conyers, Jr. announced that there would be a formal Congressional investigation of Bush's commutation of Libby's sentence and other presidential reprieves. "The Use and Misuse of Presidential Clemency Power for Executive Branch Officials", held by the U.S. House Judiciary Committee and chaired by Congressman Conyers, occurred on July 11, 2007.

== Responses to verdict ==
=== Comment on the verdict by prosecutor Patrick Fitzgerald ===
Speaking to the media outside the courtroom after the verdict, prosecutor Patrick Fitzgerald said that "The jury worked very long and hard and deliberated at length ... [and] was obviously convinced beyond a reasonable doubt that the defendant had lied and obstructed justice in a serious manner. ... 'I do not expect to file any further charges,' Fitzgerald said. 'We're all going back to our day jobs.'" As "the trial confirmed [that the leak] came first from then-Deputy Secretary of State Richard Armitage", and since Fitzgerald did not charge Armitage and expects to charge no one else, Libby's conviction "closed ... the nearly four-year investigation into how the name of Wilson's wife, Valerie Plame, and her classified job at the CIA were leaked to reporters in 2003 just days after Wilson publicly accused the administration of doctoring prewar intelligence."

During his October 28, 2005 press conference about the grand jury's indictment of Libby, Fitzgerald had already explained that Libby's obstruction of justice through perjury and false statements had "prevented him [Fitzgerald]—and the grand jury—from determining whether the alleged leak violated federal law," due to Libby's obscuring the facts of his own discussions about the then-still-classified covert CIA identity of Valerie Plame (what he had said to whom, when, where, and why).

During his media appearance outside the courtroom after the verdict in the Libby case, Fitzgerald fielded questions from the press about others involved in the Plame affair and in the CIA leak grand jury investigation, such as Richard Armitage and Vice President Dick Cheney, whom he had said "[t]here is a cloud over," caused by Libby's obstruction of justice, as already addressed in his conduct of the case and in his closing arguments in court.

=== Comment on the verdict by Libby's defense team ===
After the verdict, initially, Libby's lawyers announced that he would seek a new trial, and that, if that attempt were to fail, they would appeal Libby's conviction. "'We have every confidence Mr. Libby ultimately will be vindicated,' defense attorney Ted Wells told reporters. He said that Libby was 'totally innocent and that he did not do anything wrong.' Libby did not speak to reporters." His lawyers took no questions.

Although later Libby's defense team decided against seeking a new trial, his supporters continued to speak of appealing the verdict prior to sentencing.

=== Comment on the verdict by juror Denis Collins ===
As reported in CNN Newsroom, and subsequently on Larry King Live on CNN and by various other television networks, including MSNBC (on Scarborough Country), one juror—"Denis Collins, a Washington resident and self-described registered Democrat," who is a former reporter for The Washington Post and author of a book on espionage––"said he and fellow jurors found that passing judgment on Libby was 'unpleasant.' But in the final analysis, he said jurors found Libby's story just too hard to believe ... 'We're not saying we didn't think Mr. Libby was guilty of the things we found him guilty of, but it seemed like ... he was the fall guy' ... Collins said the jury believed Libby was 'tasked by the vice president to go and talk to reporters.'" Collins offers a day-by-day account of his experience as Juror #9 at the Libby trial in an "Exclusive" at The Huffington Post.

== Responses to commutation ==
President Bush's commutation of Libby's prison sentence became the subject of a hearing on "The Use and Misuse of Presidential Clemency Power for Executive Branch Officials" held by the U.S. House Judiciary Committee, chaired by Representative John Conyers, Jr., on July 11, 2007.

== Speculation about possible witnesses prior to the start of the trial ==
In May 2006, the Associated Press had reported that Patrick Fitzgerald was considering calling Vice President Cheney as a witness for the prosecution. In December 2006, at a pretrial hearing, defense lawyer Ted Wells reportedly said: "'We're calling the vice president.'" If that had occurred, it would have marked the first time that a sitting Vice President was called to testify in a criminal trial. Dick Cheney was represented by Emmet Flood.

On December 19, 2006, news organizations reported that Vice President Dick Cheney would be called to testify as a witness for the defense and that "former New York Times reporter Judith Miller and NBC News Washington bureau chief Tim Russert were expected to be prosecution witnesses" during Libby's trial, to begin in January 2007.

Ultimately, Vice President Cheney was not called as a witness in the trial.

In a January 2007 interview with Wolf Blitzer, Cheney commented on the ongoing trial and seemed to expect to testify: "Now, Wolf, you knew when we set up the interview you can ask all the questions you want, I'm going to be a witness in that trial within a matter of weeks, I'm not going to discuss it. I haven't discussed with anybody in the press yet, I'm not going to discuss it with you today."

== Press coverage of the trial ==
Blogs have played a prominent role in the press coverage of this trial. Scott Shane, in his article "For Liberal Bloggers, Libby Trial Is Fun and Fodder," published in The New York Times on February 15, 2007, quotes Robert Cox, president of the Media Bloggers Association, who observes that United States of America v. I. Lewis Libby is "the first federal case for which independent bloggers have been given official credentials along with reporters from the traditional news media."

On January 3, 2007, the first team of bloggers to announce that they had been granted press credentials was Firedoglake, a progressive blog founded by Jane Hamsher. Less than a week later, on January 9, the Media Bloggers Association announced that several of its affiliated bloggers had been granted press credentials too.

Among those representing the traditional press and mainstream media reporter David Shuster began live blogging the trial for MSNBC on Hardblogger, an online feature linked at Hardball with Chris Matthews, as well as reporting on camera in segments of various MSNBC News programs. A transcript of Schuster's broadcast report on the first day of the trial, during which Schuster says that the prosecution summarized evidence to support its allegations that Vice President Dick Cheney was involved in Libby's actions relating to the Plame affair, is posted on several of these news blogs.

Some controversy arose among various bloggers about who is primarily responsible for acquiring Libby trial press credentials, with numerous mainstream-media accounts, including The Washington Post, giving Cox and his Media Bloggers Association credit:

... for the first time in a federal court, two of these seats [in the actual courtroom] will be reserved for bloggers. After two years of negotiations with judicial officials across the country, the Media Bloggers Association, a nonpartisan group with about 1,000 members working to extend the powers of the press to bloggers, has won credentials to rotate among his members. The trial of I. Lewis "Scooter" Libby, the highest-ranking Bush administration official to face criminal charges, could "catalyze" the association's efforts to win respect and access for bloggers in federal and state courthouses, said Robert Cox, the association's president. Robert Cox is trying to foster standards. His Media Bloggers Association won court credentials for bloggers ...

Bloggers from Firedoglake disputed some of these statements. Scott Shane's article in The New York Times contains the following "appended correction":

[The] front-page article on Thursday about bloggers covering the perjury trial of I. Lewis Libby Jr. referred imprecisely to the role of Robert A. Cox, president of the Media Bloggers Association, in securing credentials. Mr. Cox negotiated access for his association, which was the first blogger group to be granted credentials to cover the trial. He did not negotiate on behalf of firedoglake.com and other blogs that received their credentials later.

Shane concludes: "With no audio or video feed permitted, the Firedoglake 'live blog' has offered the fullest, fastest public report available. Many mainstream journalists use it to check on the trial."

On February 7, 2007, during the examination of journalist Tim Russert, as covered on MSNBC, video clips of Libby's Grand Jury testimony were played; Russert's current testimony contradicts key parts of Libby's previous testimony, in that on the stand Russert denied that he told (or even could have told) Libby about Mrs. Wilson's working for the CIA, as Libby has claimed.

On February 13, as the defense was beginning to present its case, however, defense lawyers told the court that neither Cheney nor Libby would be taking the stand. In addition to their blogging, Jane Hamsher, Marcy Wheeler and Jeralyn Merritt also appeared on camera via PoliticsTV.com at the end of most days to sum up that day's legal proceedings directly observed in the courtroom, providing links to these video programs in their online accounts. For example, they appeared on camera to present their views of February 14, the day the defense rested, and did a similar roundup at the end of the trial, covering the closing arguments for the prosecution and the defense.

Beginning on February 26, the media reported that one of the twelve jurors had been "dismissed" because she "was exposed to information about the trial ... but the judge allowed the jury to continue deliberations with 11 members."

YearlyKos, a political convention for American liberal political activists, organized by readers and writers of Daily Kos, an influential American political blog, which took place in Chicago from August 2 through August 5, 2007, hosted a panel discussion, on August 2, by Christy Hardin Smith of Firedoglake, Jeralyn Merritt (TalkLeft), and Marcy Wheeler (The Next Hurrah) on their experiences of "live-blogging" the Libby trial, moderated by Merritt; the panel also included Sheldon L. Snook, Chief of Staff to the Chief Judge of the United States District Court for the District of Columbia, who was "the court official in charge of news media at the Libby trial."

== See also ==
- Plame affair criminal investigation
- Plame affair timeline
- Plame v. Cheney

== Additional references ==
- Leonnig, Carol, and Amy Goldstein. "Libby Given 2½-Year Prison Term: Former White House Aide 'Got Off Course,' Judge Says". The Washington Post, June 5, 2007 Accessed July 17, 2007.
- Parry, Robert. "Shame on the Washington Post, Again". The Baltimore Chronicle & Sentinel February 19, 2007. Accessed March 13, 2007.
- "Scooter Libby Video Thread". Featured video clips of "Collins Opening Remarks". Press interview with juror Denis Collins uploaded to YouTube by "ctblogger" at Connecticut Blog. Aired originally on MSNBC March 6, 2007, 12:55 p.m., ET. Accessed March 6, 2007.
- Toensing, Victoria. "Trial in Error: If You're Going to Charge Scooter, Then What About These Guys?" The Washington Post February 18, 2007. Accessed March 13, 2007.
