= Media Bloggers Association =

The Media Bloggers Association (MBA) is a United States membership-based, non-partisan voluntary association describing its activity as "supporting the development of 'blogging' or 'citizen journalism' as a distinct form of media".

In January 2007, an MBA member received press credentials identical to those of broadcast and print journalists at a federal court, to cover the trial of Lewis Libby, alongside bloggers from more established sites including Firedoglake, the Huffington Post, and Daily Kos. The MBA described this as a significant step forward in its efforts on behalf of its members, despite the fact that the major blogs covering the trial did not rely on the MBA for their credentials.

In June 2008, MBA became involved in a copyright dispute involving Associated Press demand of strict terms for bloggers quoting from their news at the request of Rogers Cadenhead whose Drudge Retort was affected.

== Criticism ==
Many of the MBA's members are unknown bloggers, but some are prominent bloggers such as Glenn Reynolds of Instapundit, Oliver Willis, Liza Sabater of Culture Kitchen, and Jeff Jarvis of BuzzMachine. Still, some bloggers have claimed that the MBA has made sweeping claims to represent bloggers. These critics have claimed that the MBA did not include any major bloggers as members nor represent a significant proportion of the blogging community. Michael Arrington of TechCrunch also claimed, without support, that a business relationship existed between the Associated Press and the MBA.

BoingBoing, one of the blogs critical of the MBA, issued a corrective stating that it was the Associated Press and the New York Times which implied that the MBA was acting on behalf of all bloggers, and not the MBA itself. MBA supporters, Robert Cox himself and others have written at length in response to these criticisms.
