= Cliff Sims =

American entrepreneur, author, and former official

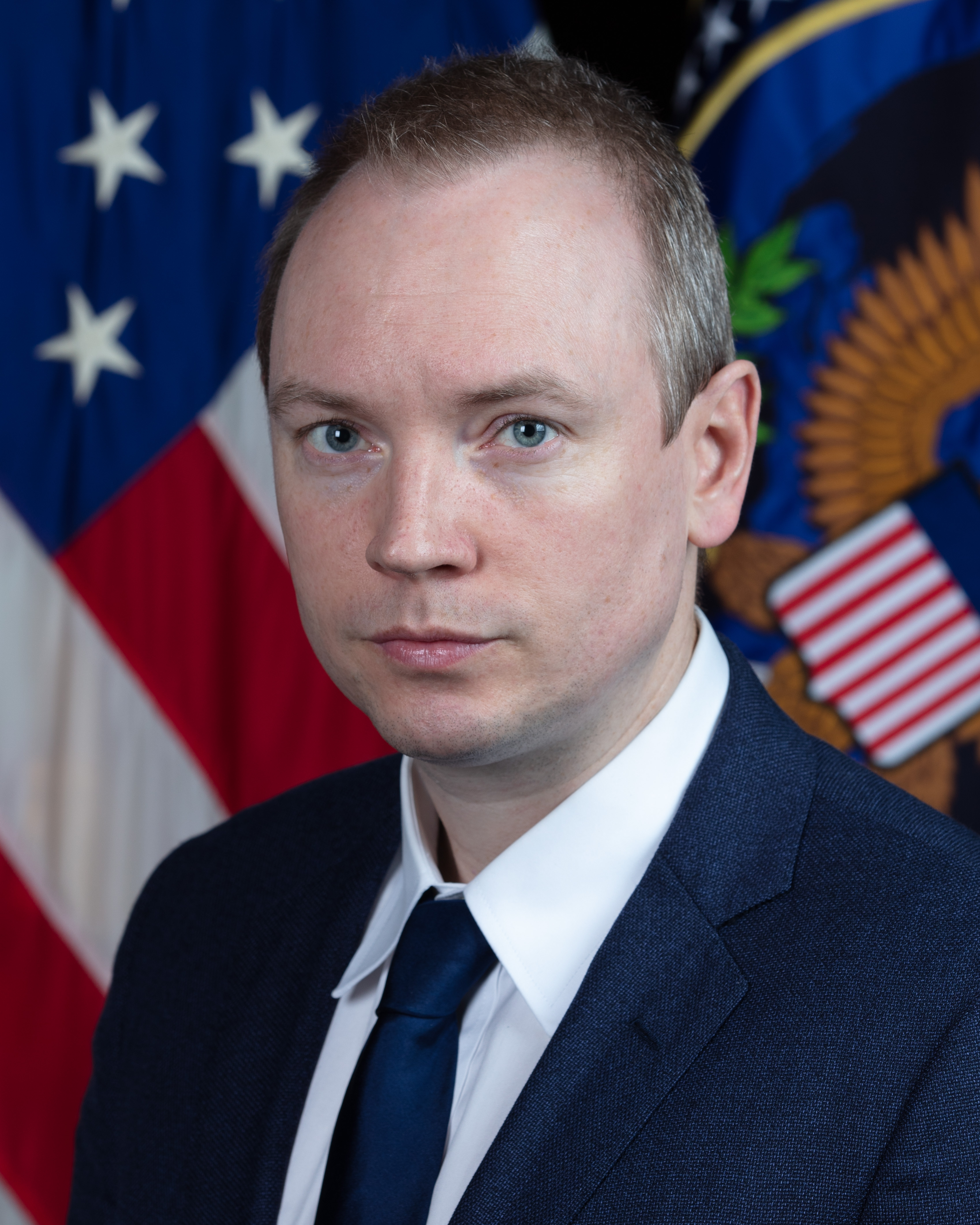

National Security Advisor to the Vice President
- Incumbent
- Assumed office May 13, 2026
- President: Donald Trump
- Vice President: JD Vance
- Preceded by: Andy Baker

Assistant to the Vice President for National Security Affairs
- Incumbent
- Assumed office May 12, 2026
- President: Donald Trump
- Vice President: JD Vance
- Preceded by: Andy Baker

Deputy Director of National Intelligence for Strategy and Communications
- In office 2020–2021
- President: Donald Trump

Special Assistant to the President Director of White House Message Strategy
- In office 2017–2018
- President: Donald Trump

Personal details
- Born: Clifton David Sims Enterprise, Alabama, U.S.
- Party: Republican
- Spouse: Megan Sims
- Children: 1
- Education: University of Alabama
- Profession: Political strategist Author

Clifton David Sims is an American entrepreneur, author and former senior White House and United States Intelligence Community official. He was Special Assistant to the President and Director of White House Message Strategy, and later as Deputy Director of National Intelligence during the first Trump administration. Team of Vipers, a memoir of his time in the White House, was a New York Times bestseller.

== Personal life and education ==
Sims grew up in a deeply religious household and is the son and grandson of Baptist ministers.

He was a college basketball point guard and received an Associate of Arts degree from Enterprise-Ozark Community College and a Bachelor of Arts degree from the University of Alabama.

Sims and his wife, Megan, adopted a son from Colombia.

== Career ==
=== Yellowhammer News ===
Sims founded Yellowhammer News, an influential Alabama-based, politically conservative news organization consisting of YellowhammerNews.com, a daily radio show, and a syndicated radio news network, with Sims as chief executive officer.

According to The Atlantic, Sims "broke high-profile state politics stories," including a series of investigative pieces that ultimately led to the resignation of Alabama Governor Robert Bentley.

In August 2015, Sims interviewed then-presidential candidate Donald Trump on his radio program ahead of Trump's Mobile, Alabama, campaign rally.

Sims later took a leave of absence as CEO of Yellowhammer to join Trump's 2016 presidential campaign as a communications advisor based in Trump Tower. He did not return as CEO after Trump's election, but rather sold his ownership stake in the company upon accepting a position in the White House.

=== White House ===
After Donald Trump's inauguration, Sims joined the White House staff as Special Assistant to the President and Director of White House Message Strategy.

According to The Atlantic, he shared "an uncommonly close relationship" with Trump. Axios reported that he "forged one of the stronger personal relationships with the President." Former White House press secretary Sarah Huckabee Sanders wrote in her memoir that Sims was "the author of the 'script' she delivered at each daily briefing."

He was also a "key figure" in the administration's successful efforts to pass the Tax Cuts and Jobs Act of 2017, regarded as Trump's signature legislative achievement.

Politico reported that Sims clashed frequently with some of his White House colleagues who joined the administration from the Republican National Committee, "making enemies with the more 'establishment' staffers in Trump's factionalized White House."

In May 2018, Axios reported that Sims was "expected to join Mike Pompeo's State Department as a senior adviser to the Secretary." While in the White House, Sims led communications for Pompeo's Senate confirmation. However, Sims never assumed the position and instead exited the administration. Then-White House press secretary Sarah Huckabee Sanders issued a statement saying, "We hated to see him resign."

=== Team of Vipers ===
In January 2019, St. Martin's Press published Sims's memoir, Team of Vipers: My 500 Extraordinary Days in the Trump White House, which spent several weeks on the bestseller list.

Publishers Weekly wrote that "Sims's vivid portrait of Trump shrewdly balances admiration with misgivings, and his intricate, engrossing accounts of White House vendettas and power plays have a good mix of immersion and perspective." Time called it "a juicy pro-Trump tell-all."

According to ABC News, although Sims "painted a harshly negative portrait of many who served the president, his book was generally positive and admiring of Trump himself."

Still, Trump lashed out at Sims, tweeting that the book was "based on made up stories and fiction." A legal dispute ensued, with the Trump campaign accusing Sims of violating a non-disclosure agreement and Sims accusing the president of seeking to impede his First Amendment rights.

The lawsuits were later dropped and Trump tapped Sims to lead messaging and speechwriting for the 2020 Republican National Convention, including personally writing remarks for the president's children.

Axios reported that Sims "has not only made peace with Trump but been brought back into the fold as an outside adviser on various initiatives," and noted that he "is a close ally of the president's eldest son Donald Trump Jr., the president's daughter Ivanka and son-in-law Jared Kushner, and Trump's close aide Hope Hicks."

=== Office of the Director of National Intelligence ===
In 2020, Sims rejoined the Trump administration as Deputy Director of National Intelligence for Strategy and Communications, a top adviser to Director of National Intelligence John Ratcliffe, with a portfolio focused on "Intelligence Community communications matters and interfacing with the White House."

He reportedly played a role in the decision to locate United States Space Command at Redstone Arsenal in his native Alabama, with The Washington Post reporting he "advocated for the move with both the White House and the Pentagon."

In a late-Trump administration "China crackdown," Sims said in a statement that the Office of the Director of National Intelligence was "delivering a necessary mindset shift from the Cold War and post-9/11 counterterrorism eras to a focus on great power competition with an adversarial China."

Sims was awarded the Director's Exceptional Achievement Award upon his departure "in recognition of superior accomplishment and valuable service to the mission of the Office of the Director of National Intelligence."

=== Telegraph Creative ===
Sims was named chief executive officer of Telegraph Creative, a corporate marketing, advertising and branding firm based in Birmingham, Alabama.

The Birmingham News reported that Telegraph Creative received "a federally funded contract worth just under $1 million" with the Alabama Department of Early Childhood Education.

The Birmingham Business Journal reported that Sims had begun a multi-million dollar, 19,200-square-foot real estate development project in downtown Birmingham to house the headquarters of Telegraph Creative.

=== U.S.-China Commission ===
In 2024, U.S. Speaker of the House Mike Johnson named Sims to the United States–China Economic and Security Review Commission. Sims was appointed to a two-year term.
