= Office of the Vice President of the United States =

U.S. government body

Office of the Vice President

Agency overview
- Formed: 1939
- Headquarters: Eisenhower Executive Office Building
- Employees: Approx 100
- Annual budget: US$ 2,591,000 (FY2022)
- Agency executive: Nick Luna, Chief of Staff to the Vice President
- Parent agency: Federal government of the United States
- Website: Vice President JD Vance

The Office of the Vice President includes personnel who directly support or advise the vice president of the United States. The office is headed by the chief of staff to the vice president of the United States. The office also provides staffing and support to the second lady of the United States. It is primarily housed in the Eisenhower Executive Office Building (containing the vice president's ceremonial office), with offices for the vice president also in the West Wing, the United States Capitol, and in the vice president's official residence.

== History ==
The vice president has three constitutional functions: to replace the president in the event of death, disability or resignation; to count the votes of electors for president and vice president and declare the winners before a joint session of Congress; and to preside over the Senate (with the role of breaking ties). According to Roger Sherman, a Connecticut congressional cabinet member and Founding Father, if the vice-president did not maintain the role of president of the Senate, then another member would have to occupy the neutral position and thus would make the Senate disproportionate. Vice president had few official duties in the executive branch, and were thus considered part of the legislative branch for purposes of salary. Salary for staff of the Office of the Vice President continues to be funded through both legislative and executive branch appropriations.

For the first century and half of its history, the vice president had no staff other than a secretary and a personal assistant or two. This began to change with the 1939 Reorganization Act, which included an "Office of the Vice President" (who at the time was John Nance Garner), under the Executive Office of the President.

Vice President Henry Wallace was given actual executive duties during World War II, as was Alben Barkley, who became a member of the National Security Council in 1949.

The Office of the Vice President has been located in the Eisenhower Executive Office Building since the 1950s. The room in the EEOB was redesigned and included emblems of the Navy Department, coinciding with the office's original purpose, the process was spearheaded by a Boston interior designer, William McPherson. The vice president individually has also been provided an office in the West Wing since 1977. Much of the Office of the Vice President centers around the offices once provided to the secretary of the Navy when the Eisenhower building was first constructed.

== Current staff ==
=== Office of the Vice President ===
- Chief of Staff to the Vice President: Nick Luna
  - Deputy Chief of Staff to the Vice President: Bryan Gray
- Director of Domestic Policy to the Vice President: Ben Moss
- National Security Adviser to the Vice President: Andy Baker
- Director of Operations to the Vice President: Abby Delahoyde
- Communications Director to the Vice President: William Martin
  - Deputy Communications Director to the Vice President: Luke Schroder
  - Press Secretary to the Vice President: Taylor Van Kirk
  - Deputy Press Secretary to the Vice President: Parker Magid
- Counsel to the Vice President: Sean Cooksey

=== Office of the Second Lady ===
The Office of the Second Lady of the United States is a White House office that supports the Second Lady in carrying out her official responsibilities and public service activities. Although the Second Lady holds no constitutional or statutory authority, she serves as a representative of the administration and often promotes charitable, educational, and civic initiatives. The office provides the staff and administrative support needed to coordinate her schedule, public appearances, travel, communications, and outreach with schools, community organizations, nonprofits, and government agencies.

As of 2026, the office supports Usha Vance, wife of current Vice President JD Vance. Her primary initiative is advancing childhood literacy through programs such as the Summer Reading Challenge and Storytime with the Second Lady. The office also assists with ceremonial events, domestic and international engagements, and public advocacy on issues chosen by the Second Lady.

=== National Security Office to the Vice President ===
The National Security Office within the Office of the Vice President (OVP) is a small advisory unit that supports the Vice President on defense, intelligence, and foreign policy issues. It provides briefings, policy analysis, and coordination with the White House National Security Council (NSC) and federal agencies, but it does not independently set or direct national security policy.

The office is led by the National Security Advisor to the Vice President, supported by a small team of senior policy advisors and staff who help prepare briefings, coordinate interagency meetings, and track international developments.

==== Current Staff ====
- National Security Advisor to the Vice President: Cliff Sims
- Principal Deputy National Security Advisor: Andy Baker
- Principal Deputy National Security Advisor: Michael Needham (serves alongside Baker)
- Deputy Chief of Staff: Bryan M. Gray (oversees major operational coordination, including security-related workflows)
- Domestic Policy Director: Ben Moss (works alongside NS team on security-adjacent policy issues)

=== The Office of Legislative Affairs ===
The Office of Legislative Affairs within the Office of the Vice President is the unit responsible for managing the Vice President’s relationship with the United States Congress. It serves as the primary liaison between the Executive Branch and Members of the House of Representatives and the Senate, helping to advance the administration’s legislative priorities.

The office works to communicate policy goals, coordinate meetings between the Vice President and congressional leaders, and track legislation as it moves through Congress. It also supports efforts related to confirmations, nominations, and key votes on major bills.

==== Current Staff ====
- Assistant to the President and Director of the Office of Legislative Affairs: James Braid
- Deputy Assistant to the President and Deputy Director: (Internal Lead): Jay Fields
- Deputy Assistant to the President and Deputy Director (House Lead): Jeff Freeland
- Deputy Assistant to the President and Deputy Director (Senate Lead): Pace McMullan

=== Office of the Chief of Staff ===
The Chief of Staff’s Office is the central coordinating unit within the Office of the Vice President. It is responsible for overseeing the day-to-day management of the Vice President’s staff and ensuring that all policy, communications, legislative, national security, and operational work is aligned with the Vice President’s priorities and schedule.

The Chief of Staff acts as the principal aide to the Vice President and serves as the main gatekeeper for access, decisions, and internal workflow. The office functions as the organisational “hub” of the Vice President’s staff, coordinating between all internal divisions and external White House offices.

==== Current Staff ====
- Chief of Staff to the Vice President: Jacob Reses
- Deputy Chief of Staff to the Vice President: Bryan Gray
- Domestic Policy Director: Ben Moss
- National Security Advisor to the Vice President: Cliff Sims
- Director of Operations: Abby Delahoyde
- Communications Director: William Martin
- Press Secretary: Taylor Van Kirk
- Deputy Press Secretary: Buckley Carlson
- Counsel to the Vice President: Sean Cooksey

== See also ==
- Title 32 of the Code of Federal Regulations
- Vice President's Room
