= Fair Game (2010 film) =

2010 biographical political drama film by Doug Liman

- Theatrical release poster
- Directed by: Doug Liman
- Written by: Jez Butterworth; John Butterworth
- Based on: Fair Game by Valerie Plame The Politics of Truth by Joseph C. Wilson
- Produced by: Jez Butterworth; Akiva Goldsman; Doug Liman; Bill Pohlad; Jerry Zucker; Janet Zucker
- Starring: Naomi Watts; Sean Penn
- Cinematography: Doug Liman
- Edited by: Christopher Tellefsen
- Music by: John Powell
- Production companies: Participant Media; River Road Entertainment; Weed Road Pictures; Hypnotic; Zucker Productions
- Distributed by: Summit Entertainment (United States); Gulf Film (United Arab Emirates)
- Release dates: May 20, 2010 (Cannes); October 1, 2010 (United States)
- Running time: 108 minutes
- Countries: United States; United Arab Emirates
- Language: English
- Budget: $22 million
- Box office: $24.2 million

Fair Game is a 2010 biographical political drama film directed by Doug Liman and starring Naomi Watts and Sean Penn. It is based on Valerie Plame's 2007 memoir Fair Game and Joseph C. Wilson's 2004 memoir The Politics of Truth.

Watts stars as Plame and Penn as her husband, Joseph C. Wilson. It was released in 2010 and was one of the official selections competing for the Palme d'Or at the 2010 Cannes Film Festival. The film won the "Freedom of Expression Award" from the National Board of Review. The film marked Watts' and Penn's third collaboration, having previously co-starred in the films 21 Grams and The Assassination of Richard Nixon.

Fair Game was the final film of actress Polly Holliday before her death in 2025.

== Plot ==
Valerie Plame is employed by the Central Intelligence Agency, a fact known outside the agency to no one except her husband and parents. She is an intelligence officer involved in a number of sensitive and sometimes dangerous covert operations overseas.

Her husband, Joseph C. Wilson, is a diplomat who most recently has served as the U.S. ambassador to Gabon. Due to his earlier diplomatic background in Niger, Wilson is approached by Plame's CIA colleagues to travel there and glean information as to whether yellowcake uranium is being procured by Iraq for use in the construction of nuclear weapons. Wilson determines to his own satisfaction that it is not.

After military action is taken by George W. Bush, who justifies it in a 2003 State of the Union address by alluding to the uranium's use in building weapons of mass destruction, Wilson submits an op-ed piece to The New York Times, claiming these reports to be categorically untrue.

Plame's status as a CIA operative is subsequently revealed in the media, the leak possibly coming from White House officials, including the vice president's chief of staff and national security adviser, Scooter Libby, in part to discredit her husband's allegation that the Bush administration had manipulated intelligence to justify the invasion of Iraq. As a result, Plame is instantly dismissed from the agency, leaving several of her delicate operations in limbo and creating a rift in her marriage.

Plame leaves her husband, further angered by his granting of television and print interviews, which expose them both to public condemnation and death threats. Wilson ultimately persuades her, however, that there is no other way to fight a power as great as that of the White House for citizens like them. Plame returns to him and testifies before a Congressional committee, while Libby is convicted of perjury and obstruction of justice and given a 30-month prison sentence, although President Bush commutes the jail time on Libby's behalf.

== Main cast ==
- Naomi Watts as Valerie Plame
- Sean Penn as Joseph Wilson
- Noah Emmerich as Bill
- Ty Burrell as Fred
- Sam Shepard as Sam Plame
- Polly Holliday as Diane Plame
- Bruce McGill as James Pavitt
- Brooke Smith as Diana
- Michael Kelly as Jack
- Liraz Charhi as Dr. Zahara
- Khaled El Nabawy as Hamed
- Anand Tiwari as Hafiz
- David Denman as Dave
- David Andrews as Scooter Libby
- Geoffrey Cantor as Ari Fleischer
- Adam LeFevre as Karl Rove
- Nassar as Mr. Tabir
- Satya Bhabha as Jason Neal
- Norbert Leo Butz as Steve

== Production ==
Nicole Kidman and Russell Crowe were originally cast in the lead roles in 2008.

Production took place in Washington, D.C. and New York City. In October 2009 the film news website Corona's Coming Attractions published an exclusive review from a source that had been invited to a test screening of the film. The reviewer gave the rough cut a positive recommendation calling it, "A wonderful human drama with political suspense that should interest anybody no matter how they vote."

The film had a public screening during the Abu Dhabi film festival on October 21, 2010, and it got a generally positive review. There was also a Q&A session with the director afterwards.

There was a second preview screening in Brisbane, Australia as part of the Brisbane International Film Festival (BIFF) on October 28, 2010.

== Critical reception ==
On review aggregator Rotten Tomatoes, the film holds an approval rating of 78% based on 174 reviews, with an average rating of 6.89/10. The website's critics consensus reads: "It struggles with the balance between fact-based biopic and taut political thriller, but Fair Game brims with righteous anger – and benefits from superb performances by Naomi Watts and Sean Penn." On Metacritic, the film has a weighted average score of 69 out of 100, based on 35 critics, indicating "generally favorable" reviews. Audiences polled by CinemaScore gave it a grade "A−" on a scale from A+ to F.

== Historical accuracy ==
The film's premise – that Joseph Wilson's fact-finding trip to Niger debunked the British claim that Saddam Hussein had tried to obtain uranium there – remained contested by some political writers. In a November 2010 Washington Post column about the film, Walter Pincus and Richard Leiby, two reporters who had covered the Plame affair, wrote that Wilson's assessment of the situation was accurate, while National Review journalist Clifford May disagreed, writing that "the most important piece of information Wilson brought back from his mission to Africa was that a high-level Iraqi trade mission had visited Niger in 1999." Separately a December 2010 Washington Post editorial also disagreed with Pincus and Leiby, citing the 2004 British Butler Review, which stated that the original claim by the British government was accurate. In response, journalist David Corn wrote in Mother Jones that, contrary to the Butler Review, the CIA had stated in a private memo that the British uranium claim had been an exaggeration.

Another contested issue in the film was that Plame's name had been leaked to conservative political commentator Robert Novak by someone in the White House, as retribution for Wilson's public comments about the uranium deal. The Washington Post editorial and Clifford May both stated that the leak was from the State Department, specifically Richard Armitage, who was himself an opponent of the Iraq War and thus would have no reason to try to discredit Wilson. Pincus and Leiby, on the other hand, called this portion of the film accurate. Corn agreed, writing that, though Armitage had been a source for the leak, he may not have been the only source, and that Karl Rove may have also leaked the information. Rove had in fact confirmed Plame's identity to Novak, but only after Novak had already heard the information from another source. Rove had also mentioned Plame, though not by name, to another reporter, Time magazine's Matthew Cooper, although Cooper did not publish this information before Novak's revelation.

There was more consensus about other aspects of Fair Game. In the film, Valerie Plame is shown working closely, and covertly, with a group of Iraqi scientists until her cover is blown; it is implied that the scientists were then abandoned as a result. Pincus and Leiby, May and the Washington Post editorial all agreed that Plame never worked directly with the scientists, and that the program did not end when her name was revealed.

Pincus and Leiby also took issue with the film's depiction of Plame and Wilson's appearance in a profile in Vanity Fair magazine after Plame's outing – the two are shown in the film agonizing over whether to appear in the profile, but it is not shown that their decision to appear in a fashion-style photograph alongside the profile ended up becoming, in Pincus and Leiby's words, "a PR debacle for them."

On the other hand, Pincus and Leiby praised the film for accuracy on several other points, including the indication that Plame had been a covert operative at the time of her outing (some reports indicated that she was not), and that, contrary to the original Novak column, Wilson had not been chosen to go on the Niger fact-finding trip due to a recommendation from his wife.

== Home media ==
Fair Game was released on DVD and Blu-ray for Region 1/Region A on March 29, 2011, and for Region 2/Region B on July 11, 2011.

== Director's cut ==
A director's cut of the film was released on Netflix in 2018, running six minutes longer. The re-edit brings Plame and Wilson’s marriage to the foreground, and provides more backstory for Plame’s work. Director Doug Liman explained, “I thought that I could greatly enhance the relationship between Joe[sph] and Valerie. I had better material in the can than what I had put on screen … I really just wanted to edit more from the gut.”

== See also ==
- Plame affair
- Fair Game (soundtrack)
