= Plame affair =

2003 American political scandal

The Plame affair (also known as the CIA leak scandal and Plamegate) was a political scandal that revolved around journalist Robert Novak's public identification of Valerie Plame as a covert Central Intelligence Agency officer in 2003.

In 2002, Plame wrote a memo to her superiors in which she expressed hesitation in recommending her husband, former diplomat Joseph C. Wilson, to the CIA for a mission to Niger to investigate claims that Iraq had arranged to purchase and import uranium from the country, but stated that he "may be in a position to assist". After President George W. Bush stated that "Saddam Hussein recently sought significant quantities of uranium from Africa" during the run-up to the 2003 invasion of Iraq, Wilson published a July 2003 op-ed in The New York Times, "What I Didn't Find in Africa", stating his doubts during the mission that any such transaction with Iraq had taken place.

A week after Wilson's op-ed was published, Novak published a column in The Washington Post which mentioned claims from "two senior administration officials" that Plame had been the one to suggest sending her husband. Novak had learned of Plame's employment, which was classified information, from State Department official Richard Armitage. Journalist David Corn and others suggested that Armitage and other officials had leaked the information as political retribution for Wilson's article.

The scandal led to a criminal investigation; no one was charged for the leak itself. Vice President Dick Cheney's chief of staff, Scooter Libby, was convicted of lying to investigators. His prison sentence was ultimately commuted by President Bush in 2007, and he was pardoned by President Donald Trump in 2018.

== Background ==
=== State of the Union Address ===
In late February 2002, responding to inquiries from the Vice President's office and the Departments of State and Defense about the allegation that Iraq had a sales agreement to buy uranium in the form of yellowcake from Niger, the Central Intelligence Agency had authorized a trip by Joseph C. Wilson to Niger to investigate the possibility. The former Prime Minister of Niger, Ibrahim Hassane Mayaki, reported to Wilson that he was unaware of any contracts for uranium sales to rogue states, though he was approached by a businessman on behalf of an Iraqi delegation about "expanding commercial relations" with Iraq, which Mayaki interpreted to mean uranium sales. Wilson ultimately concluded that there "was nothing to the story", and reported his findings in March 2002.

In his January 28, 2003, State of the Union Address, US President George W. Bush said "The British government has learned that Saddam Hussein recently sought significant quantities of uranium from Africa."

=== "What I Didn't Find In Africa" ===
After the March 2003 invasion of Iraq, Joseph C. Wilson wrote a series of op-eds questioning the war's factual basis (See "Bibliography" in The Politics of Truth). In one of these op-eds published in The New York Times on July 6, 2003, Wilson argues that, in the State of the Union Address, President George W. Bush misrepresented intelligence leading up to the invasion and thus misleadingly suggested that the Iraqi government sought uranium to manufacture nuclear weapons.

However, an article by journalist Susan Schmidt in The Washington Post on July 10, 2004, stated that the Iraq Intelligence Commission and the United States Senate Select Committee on Intelligence at various times concluded that Wilson's claims were incorrect. She reported that the Senate report stated that Wilson's report actually bolstered, rather than debunked, intelligence about purported uranium sales to Iraq. This conclusion has retained considerable currency despite a subsequent correction provided by the Post on the article's website: "Correction: In some editions of the Post, a July 10 story on a new Senate report on intelligence failures said that former ambassador Joseph C. Wilson IV told his contacts at the CIA that Iraq had tried to buy 400 tons of uranium from the African nation of Niger in 1998. In fact, it was Iran that was interested in making that purchase." Wilson took strong exception to these conclusions in his 2004 memoir The Politics of Truth. The State Department also remained highly skeptical about the Niger claim.

Former CIA Director George Tenet said "[while President Bush] had every reason to believe that the text presented to him was sound", because "[f]rom what we know now, Agency officials in the end concurred that the text in the speech was factually correct – i.e. that the British government report said that Iraq sought uranium from Africa," nevertheless "[t]hese 16 words should never have been included in the text written for the President." With regard to Wilson's findings, Tenet stated: "Because this report, in our view, did not resolve whether Iraq was or was not seeking uranium from abroad, it was given a normal and wide distribution, but we did not brief it to the President, Vice-President or other senior Administration officials."

=== "Mission To Niger" ===
Eight days after Wilson's July 6 op-ed, columnist Robert Novak wrote about Wilson's 2002 trip to Niger and subsequent findings and described Wilson's wife as an "agency operative".

In his column of July 14, 2003, entitled "Mission to Niger", Novak states that the choice to use Wilson "was made routinely at a low level without [CIA] Director George Tenet's knowledge." Novak goes on to identify Plame as Wilson's wife:

Wilson never worked for the CIA, but his wife, Valerie Plame, is an agency operative on weapons of mass destruction. Two senior administration officials told me that Wilson's wife suggested sending him to Niger to investigate the Italian report. The CIA says its counter-proliferation officials selected Wilson and asked his wife to contact him. "I will not answer any question about my wife," Wilson told me.

Novak has said repeatedly that he was not told, and that he did not know, that Plame was – or had ever been – a NOC, an agent with Non-Official Cover. He has emphatically said that had he understood that she was any sort of secret agent, he would never have named her.

On July 16, 2003, an article published by David Corn in The Nation carried this lead: "Did Bush officials blow the cover of a U.S. intelligence officer working covertly in a field of vital importance to national security – and break the law – in order to strike at a Bush administration critic and intimidate others?"

In that article, Corn notes: "Without acknowledging whether she is a deep-cover CIA employee, Wilson says, 'Naming her this way would have compromised every operation, every relationship, every network with which she had been associated in her entire career. This is the stuff of Kim Philby and Aldrich Ames.'" Wilson has said:

I felt that ... however abominable the decision might be, it was rational that if you were an administration and did not want people talking about the intelligence or talking about what underpinned the decision to go to war, you would discourage them by destroying the credibility of the messenger who brought you the message. And this administration apparently decided the way to do that was to leak the name of my wife.

In October 2007, regarding his column "A White House Smear", Corn writes:

That piece was the first to identify the leak as a possible White House crime and the first to characterize the leak as evidence that within the Bush administration political expedience trumped national security. The column drew about 100,000 visitors to this website in a day or so. And – fairly or not – it's been cited by some as the event that triggered the Plame hullabaloo. I doubt that the column prompted the investigation eventually conducted by special counsel Patrick Fitzgerald, for I assume that had my column not appeared the CIA still would have asked the Justice Department to investigate the leak as a possible crime.

=== Department of Justice investigation ===
On September 16, 2003, the CIA sent a letter to the United States Department of Justice (DoJ), requesting a criminal investigation of the matter. On September 29, 2003, the Department of Justice advised the CIA that it had requested an FBI investigation into the matter.

On September 30, 2003, President Bush said that if there had been "a leak" from his administration about Plame, "I want to know who it is ... and if the person has violated law, the person will be taken care of." Initially, the White House denied that Karl Rove, the White House Deputy Chief of Staff, and Lewis "Scooter" Libby, Chief of Staff of Vice President Dick Cheney, were involved in the leak.

Attorney General John Ashcroft recused himself from involvement with the investigation because of his close involvement with the White House, and the responsibility for oversight fell to James B. Comey, a former prosecutor who had just been appointed deputy attorney general three weeks previously. Comey then appointed Patrick Fitzgerald to investigate the matter as Special Counsel who convened a grand jury. The CIA leak grand jury investigation did not result in the indictment or conviction of anyone for any crime in connection with the leak itself. However, Libby was indicted on one count of obstruction of justice, one count of perjury, and three counts of making false statements to the grand jury and federal investigators on October 28, 2005. Libby resigned hours after the indictment.

=== United States v. Libby ===
The federal trial United States v. Libby began on January 16, 2007. On March 6, 2007, Libby was convicted on four counts, and was acquitted of one count of making false statements. Libby was sentenced to 30 months in prison, a fine of US$250,000, and two years of supervised release after his prison term.

After the verdict, Special Counsel Fitzgerald stated that he did not expect anyone else to be charged in the case: "We're all going back to our day jobs." On July 2, 2007, President Bush commuted Libby's jail sentence, effectively erasing the 30 months he was supposed to spend in jail. Libby was pardoned by Donald Trump on Friday, April 13, 2018.

In March 2008, the Government Accountability Office (GAO) revealed that the investigation had cost $2.58 million. The GAO also reported that "this matter is now concluded for all practical purposes."

=== Civil suit ===
According to testimony given in the CIA leak grand jury investigation and United States v. Libby, Bush administration officials Richard Armitage, Karl Rove, and Lewis Libby discussed the employment of a then-classified, covert CIA officer, Valerie E. Wilson (also known as Valerie Plame), with members of the press.

The Wilsons also brought a civil lawsuit against Libby, Dick Cheney, Rove, and Armitage, in Wilson v. Cheney. On July 19, 2007, Wilson v. Cheney was dismissed in United States District Court for the District of Columbia. On behalf of the Wilsons, Citizens for Responsibility and Ethics in Washington filed an appeal of the U.S. District Court's decision the following day.

In dismissing the civil suit, United States District Judge John D. Bates stated:

The merits of plaintiffs' claims pose important questions relating to the propriety of actions undertaken by our highest government officials. Defendants' motions, however, raise issues that the Court is obliged to address before it can consider the merits of plaintiffs' claims. As it turns out, the Court will not reach, and therefore expresses no views on, the merits of the constitutional and other tort claims asserted by plaintiffs based on defendants' alleged disclosures because the motions to dismiss will be granted ... The alleged means by which defendants chose to rebut Mr. Wilson's comments and attack his credibility may have been highly unsavory. But there can be no serious dispute that the act of rebutting public criticism, such as that levied by Mr. Wilson against the Bush Administration's handling of prewar foreign intelligence, by speaking with members of the press is within the scope of defendants' duties as high-level Executive Branch officials. Thus, the alleged tortious conduct, namely the disclosure of Mrs. Wilson's status as a covert operative, was incidental to the kind of conduct that defendants were employed to perform.

Judge Bates ruled that the "plaintiffs have not exhausted their administrative remedies under the Federal Tort Claims Act, which is the proper, and exclusive, avenue for relief on such a claim." Bates ruled that the FTCA outlines the appropriate remedy since the FTCA "accords federal employees absolute immunity from common-law tort claims arising out of acts they undertake in the course of their official duties," and the "plaintiffs have not pled sufficient facts that would rebut the [FTCA] certification filed in this action."

The Wilsons appealed that decision the next day. On August 12, 2008, the U.S. Court of Appeals for the District of Columbia Circuit upheld the District Court's ruling in a 2–1 decision.

The Wilsons asked the U.S. Supreme Court to hear their appeal of the U.S. Court of Appeals ruling. On May 20, 2009, the Justice Department, in a brief filed by Solicitor General Elena Kagan, Assistant Attorney General Tony West, and Justice Department attorneys Mark B. Stern and Charles W. Scarborough, took the position that, "The decision of the court of appeals is correct and does not conflict with any decision of this Court or any other court of appeals, ... Further review is unwarranted." Melanie Sloan, an attorney for the Wilsons and the executive director of the watchdog group Citizens for Responsibility and Ethics in Washington, released a statement that read, "We are deeply disappointed that the Obama administration has failed to recognize the grievous harm top Bush White House officials inflicted on Joe and Valerie Wilson ... The government's position cannot be reconciled with President Obama's oft-stated commitment to once again make government officials accountable for their actions."

According to the brief filed by the Justice Department:

Petitioners allege that Novak's July 14, 2003 column publicly disclosed Ms. Wilson's covert CIA employment and that that disclosure 'destroyed her cover as a classified CIA employee'. Petitioners, however, allege that Novak's source was Armitage, and do not allege that any of the three defendants against whom Mr. Wilson presses his First Amendment claim-Cheney, Rove, and Libby-caused that column to be published. In the absence of factual allegations that Mr. Wilson's alleged injury from the public disclosure of his wife's CIA employment is 'fairly traceable' to alleged conduct by Cheney, Rove, or Libby, petitioners have failed to establish Article III jurisdiction over Mr. Wilson's First Amendment claim.

On June 22, 2009, the U.S. Supreme Court announced, without comment, it would not hear an appeal to the U.S. Court of Appeals ruling. According to a statement issued by CREW, the Supreme Court decision brings "the case to a close." In the statement, Melanie Sloan responded to the ruling:

The Wilsons and their counsel are disappointed by the Supreme Court's refusal to hear the case, but more significantly, this is a setback for our democracy. This decision means that government officials can abuse their power for political purposes without fear of repercussion. Private citizens like the Wilsons, who see their careers destroyed and their lives placed in jeopardy by administration officials seeking to score political points and silence opposition, have no recourse.

== Valerie Wilson's role in Joe Wilson's selection ==
The Wilsons, and CIA memoranda presented in the report by the United States Senate Select Committee on Intelligence, indicate that Ambassador Wilson's diplomatic experience in Africa, and particularly in Niger, led to his selection for the mission to Niger. He is fluent in French, and, during his diplomatic career prior to the trip, he had served as a U.S. State Department general services officer in Niger, as an ambassador to Gabon and São Tomé and Príncipe, as Deputy Chief of Mission (DCM) in both Brazzaville and Iraq (taking over as Chief of Mission during the 1990–91 Gulf War), in other diplomatic postings, and in subsequent national security and military advisory roles concerning U.S.-African affairs under Presidents George H. W. Bush and Bill Clinton.

After being consulted by her superiors at the CIA about whom to send on the mission, Valerie Plame, according to the Senate Select Committee on Intelligence, suggested that they ask Ambassador Wilson, her husband, whom she had married in 1998, whether or not he might be interested in making such a trip.

In the book Hubris: The Inside Story of Spin, Scandal, and the Selling of the Iraq War by Michael Isikoff and David Corn, the authors consider the issue of whether Valerie Wilson had sent her husband to Niger to check out an intelligence report that Iraq had sought uranium there, presenting new information undermining the charge that she arranged this trip. In an interview with the authors, Douglas Rohn, a State Department officer who wrote a crucial memo related to the trip, acknowledges he may have inadvertently created a misimpression that her involvement was more significant than it had been."

In his testimony to the grand jury, Libby testified that both he and Vice President Cheney believed that Joseph Wilson was qualified for the mission, though they wondered if he would have been selected had his wife not worked at the CIA.

Subsequent press accounts reported that "White House officials wanted to know how much of a role she had in selecting him for the assignment."

In his book, Tenet writes "Mid-level officials in [the CIA's Counterproliferation Division (CPD)] decided on their own initiative to [ask Joe Wilson to look into the Niger issue because] he'd helped them on a project once before, and he'd be easy to contact because his wife worked in CPD."

In March 2007, Plame addressed the question while testifying before the United States House Committee on Oversight and Government Reform: "I did not recommend him. I did not suggest him. There was no nepotism involved. I did not have the authority. ... It's been borne out in the testimony during the Libby trial, and I can tell you that it just doesn't square with the facts." She described that in February 2002, while discussing an inquiry from the office of Vice President Cheney about the alleged Iraqi uranium purchases, a colleague who knew of her husband's diplomatic background and previous work with the CIA suggested sending him, and that she agreed to facilitate the discussion between her husband and her superiors despite her own ambivalence about the idea.

In response to Plame's testimony, Republican Senators Kit Bond, Orrin Hatch, Richard Burr submitted additional views to the Senate report that stated "Mrs. Wilson told the CIA Inspector General that she suggested her husband for the trip, she told our committee staff that she could not remember whether she did or her boss did, and told the House Committee, emphatically, that she did not suggest him." Also in the additional views is the full text of an e-mail message sent by Plame on February 12, 2002, to the Directorate of Operations at CPD, in which she writes that Joe Wilson "may be in a position to assist" the CIA's inquiries into the Niger reports.

In a review of Plame's memoir, Fair Game, Alan Cooperman wrote for The Washington Post that "by her own account, Valerie Wilson neither came up with the idea [of sending Joe Wilson to Niger] nor approved it. But she did participate in the process and flogged her husband's credentials." Plame writes in her book that Joe Wilson was "too upset to listen" to her explanations after learning years later about the February 12, 2002 email she had sent up the chain of command outlining his credentials.

== Robert Novak ==
In September 2003, on CNN's Crossfire, Novak asserted: "Nobody in the Bush administration called me to leak this. There is no great crime here," adding that while he learned from two administration officials that Plame was a CIA employee, "[The CIA] asked me not to use her name, but never indicated it would endanger her or anybody else. According to a confidential source at the CIA, Mrs. Wilson was an analyst, not a spy, not a covert operative and not in charge of undercover operators."

In "The CIA Leak", published on October 1, 2003, Novak describes how he had obtained the information for his July 14, 2003, column "Mission to Niger":

I was curious why a high-ranking official in President Bill Clinton's National Security Council (NSC) was given this assignment. Wilson had become a vocal opponent of President Bush's policies in Iraq after contributing to Al Gore in the last election cycle and John Kerry in this one. During a long conversation with a senior administration official, I asked why Wilson was assigned the mission to Niger. He said Wilson had been sent by the CIA's counter-proliferation section at the suggestion of one of its employees, his wife. It was an offhand revelation from this official, who is no partisan gunslinger. When I called another official for confirmation, he said: "Oh, you know about it." The published report that somebody in the White House failed to plant this story with six reporters and finally found me as a willing pawn is simply untrue. At the CIA, the official designated to talk to me denied that Wilson's wife had inspired his selection but said she was delegated to request his help. He asked me not to use her name, saying she probably never again will be given a foreign assignment but that exposure of her name might cause "difficulties" if she travels abroad. He never suggested to me that Wilson's wife or anybody else would be endangered. If he had, I would not have used her name. I used it in the sixth paragraph of my column because it looked like the missing explanation of an otherwise incredible choice by the CIA for its mission.

In that column, Novak also claims to have learned Mrs. Wilson's maiden name "Valerie Plame" from Joe Wilson's entry in Who's Who In America, though it was her CIA status rather than her maiden name which was a secret. Novak wrote in his column "It was well known around Washington that Wilson's wife worked for the CIA," though that assertion is contradicted by Special Counsel Patrick Fitzgerald, Valerie Wilson, and the CIA.

According to Murray S. Waas in The American Prospect of February 12, 2004, the CIA source warned Novak several times against the publication: two "administration officials" spoke to the FBI and challenged Novak's account about not receiving warnings not to publish Plame's name; according to one of the officials, "At best, he is parsing words ... At worst, he is lying to his readers and the public. Journalists should not lie, I would think."

Novak's critics argue that after decades as a Washington reporter, Novak was well aware of Plame's CIA status due to the wording he used in his column. A search of the LexisNexis database for the terms "CIA operative" and "agency operative" showed Novak had accurately used the terms to describe covert CIA employees, every time they appear in his articles.

On March 17, 2007, Plame testified before the House Committee on Oversight and Government Reform. She was asked how she learned of Novak's reference to her in his column. Plame told the committee

I found out very early in the morning when my husband came in and dropped the newspaper on the bed and said, 'He did it'. ... We had indications in the week prior that Mr. Novak knew my identity and my true employer. And I of course alerted my superiors at the agency, and I was told, don't worry; we'll take care of it. And it was much to our surprise that we read about this July 14. ... I believe, and this is what I've read, that the then-spokesman, Mr. Harlow, spoke directly with Mr. Novak and said something along the lines of, don't go with this; don't do this. I don't know exactly what he said, but he clearly communicated the message that Mr. Novak should not publish my name.

Novak has written, "the CIA never warned me that the disclosure of Wilson's wife working at the agency would endanger her or anybody else."

According to The Washington Post, Harlow conveyed in an interview, "he warned Novak, in the strongest terms he was permitted to use without revealing classified information, that Wilson's wife had not authorized the mission and that if he did write about it, her name should not be revealed." Novak published a column refuting Harlow's claim. In his book, George Tenet wrote

Bill [Harlow] struggled to convince Novak that he had been misinformed [about Wilson's wife being responsible for sending her husband to Niger]-and that it would be unwise to report Mrs. Wilson's name. He couldn't tell Novak that Valerie Wilson was undercover. Saying so over an open phone line itself would have been a security breach. Bill danced around the subject and asked Novak not to include her in the story. Several years and many court dates later, we know that the message apparently didn't get through, but Novak never told Bill that he was going to ignore his advice to leave Valerie's name out of his article.

In a December 2008 interview with the National Ledger, Novak was asked about his role in the Plame affair. Novak replied:

If you read my book, you find a certain ambivalence there. Journalistically, I thought it was an important story because it explained why the CIA would send Joe Wilson – a former Clinton White House aide with no track record in intelligence and no experience in Niger – on a fact-finding mission to Africa. From a personal point of view, I said in the book I probably should have ignored what I'd been told about Mrs. Wilson. Now I'm much less ambivalent. I'd go full speed ahead because of the hateful and beastly way in which my left-wing critics in the press and Congress tried to make a political affair out of it and tried to ruin me. My response now is this: The hell with you. They didn't ruin me. I have my faith, my family, and a good life. A lot of people love me – or like me. So they failed. I would do the same thing over again because I don't think I hurt Valerie Plame whatsoever.

== Richard Armitage ==
On July 11, 2006, Robert Novak posted a column titled "My Role in the Valerie Plame Leak Story": "Special Prosecutor Patrick Fitzgerald has informed my attorneys that, after two and one-half years, his investigation of the CIA leak case concerning matters directly relating to me has been concluded. That frees me to reveal my role in the federal inquiry that, at the request of Fitzgerald, I have kept secret." Novak dispels rumors that he asserted his Fifth Amendment right and made a plea bargain, stating: "I have cooperated in the investigation." He continues:

For nearly the entire time of his investigation, Fitzgerald knew – independent of me – the identity of the sources I used in my column of July 14, 2003. That Fitzgerald did not indict any of these sources may indicate his conclusion that none of them violated the Intelligence Identities Protection Act. ... In my sworn testimony, I said what I have contended in my columns and on television: Joe Wilson's wife's role in instituting her husband's mission was revealed to me in the middle of a long interview with an official who I have previously said was not a political gunslinger. After the federal investigation was announced, he told me through a third party that the disclosure was inadvertent on his part. Following my interview with the primary source, I sought out the second administration official and the CIA spokesman for confirmation. I learned Valerie Plame's name from Joe Wilson's entry in "Who's Who in America. (Italics added.)

Harlow is the person whom Novak refers to as his "CIA source" for his column "Mission to Niger".

Michael Isikoff revealed portions of his new book titled Hubris: The Inside Story of Spin, Scandal, and the Selling of the Iraq War, co-authored with David Corn, in the August 28, 2006, issue of Newsweek. Isikoff reports that then Deputy Secretary of State Richard Armitage had a central role in the Plame affair.

In their book Hubris, Isikoff and Corn reveal – as both Armitage and syndicated columnist Robert Novak acknowledged publicly later – that Armitage was Novak's "initial" and "primary source" for Novak's July 2003 column that revealed Plame's identity as a CIA operative and that after Novak revealed his "primary source" (Novak's phrase) was a "senior administration official" who was "not a partisan gunslinger", Armitage phoned Colin Powell that morning and was "in deep distress". Reportedly, Armitage told Powell: "I'm sure [Novak is] talking about me." In his Newsweek article, Isikoff states:

The next day, a team of FBI agents and Justice prosecutors investigating the leak questioned the deputy secretary. Armitage acknowledged that he had passed along to Novak information contained in a classified State Department memo: that Wilson's wife worked on weapons-of-mass-destruction issues at the CIA ... [William Howard Taft IV, the State Department's legal adviser] felt obligated to inform White House counsel Alberto Gonzales. But Powell and his aides feared the White House would then leak that Armitage had been Novak's source – possibly to embarrass State Department officials who had been unenthusiastic about Bush's Iraq policy. So Taft told Gonzales the bare minimum: that the State Department had passed some information about the case to Justice. He didn't mention Armitage. Taft asked if Gonzales wanted to know the details. The president's lawyer, playing the case by the book, said no, and Taft told him nothing more. Armitage's role thus remained that rarest of Washington phenomena: a hot secret that never leaked.

According to Isikoff, as based on his sources, Armitage told Bob Woodward Plame's identity three weeks before talking to Novak, and Armitage himself was aggressively investigated by special counsel Patrick Fitzgerald, but was never charged because Fitzgerald found no evidence that Armitage knew of Plame's covert CIA status when he talked to Novak and Woodward.

In an August 27, 2006, appearance on Meet the Press, Novak was asked if indeed Armitage was his source of Mrs. Wilson's identity as a CIA operative. Novak responded: "I told Mr. Isikoff ... that I do not identify my sources on any subject if they're on a confidential basis until they identify themselves ... I'm going to say one thing, though, I haven't said before. And that is that I believe that the time has way passed for my source to identify himself."

On August 30, 2006, The New York Times reported that the lawyer and other associates of Armitage confirmed he was Novak's "initial and primary source" for Plame's identity. The New York Times also reported

Mr. Armitage cooperated voluntarily in the case, never hired a lawyer and testified several times to the grand jury, according to people who are familiar with his role and actions in the case. He turned over his calendars, datebooks and even his wife's computer in the course of the inquiry, those associates said. But Mr. Armitage kept his actions secret, not even telling President Bush because the prosecutor asked him not to divulge it, the people said ... Mr. Armitage had prepared a resignation letter, his associates said. But he stayed on the job because State Department officials advised that his sudden departure could lead to the disclosure of his role in the leak, the people aware of his actions said. ... He resigned in November 2004, but remained a subject of the inquiry until [February 2006] when the prosecutor advised him in a letter that he would not be charged.

In an interview with CBS News first broadcast on September 7, 2006, Armitage admitted that he was Novak's "initial" and "primary source" (Novak's words). In the interview, he described his conversation with Novak: "At the end of a wide-ranging interview he asked me, "Why did the CIA send Ambassador (Wilson) to Africa?" I said I didn't know, but that she worked out at the agency, adding it was "just an offhand question. ... I didn't put any big import on it and I just answered and it was the last question we had." After acknowledging that he was indeed Robert Novak's initial and primary source for the column outing Plame, Richard Armitage referred to what has been termed "a classified State Department memorandum" which purportedly refers to Valerie Wilson.

While the document is "classified", Armitage stated, "it doesn't mean that every sentence in the document is classified. ... I had never seen a covert agent's name in any memo in, I think, 28 years of government. ... I didn't know the woman's name was Plame. I didn't know she was an operative. ... I didn't try to out anybody." In a phone interview with The Washington Post, Armitage reiterated his claim, stating that in 40 years of reading classified materials "I have never seen in a memo ... a covert agent's name."

According to The Washington Post, Armitage attributed his not being charged in the investigation to his candor in speaking with investigators about his action; he says that he turned over his computers and never hired an attorney: "'I did not need an attorney to tell me to tell the truth.'"

Novak disputed Armitage's claim that the disclosure was "inadvertent". In a column titled "The real story behind the Armitage story", Novak stated:

First, Armitage did not, as he now indicates, merely pass on something he had heard and that he 'thought' might be so. Rather, he identified to me the CIA division where Mrs. Wilson worked, and said flatly that she recommended the mission to Niger by her husband, former Ambassador Joseph Wilson. Second, Armitage did not slip me this information as idle chitchat, as he now suggests. He made clear he considered it especially suited for my column ... he noted that the story of Mrs. Wilson's role fit the style of the old Evans-Novak column – implying to me it continued reporting Washington inside information.

Novak also disputes Armitage's claim that he learned he was Novak's "primary source" (Novak's phrase) only after reading Novak's October 1 column: "I believed [Washington lobbyist Kenneth Duberstein, Armitage's close friend and political adviser] contacted me October 1 because of news the weekend of September 27–28 that the Justice Department was investigating the leak."

Armitage also acknowledged that he was Woodward's source. At the end of a lengthy interview conducted in the first week of September 2006, he describes his June 2003 conversation with Woodward as an afterthought: "He said, 'Hey, what's the deal with Wilson?' and I said, 'I think his wife works out there.'"

In his memoir, titled The Prince of Darkness: 50 Years of Reporting In Washington, Novak wrote that after Armitage revealed to him that Joe Wilson's wife worked at the CIA, "Armitage smiled and said: 'That's real Evans and Novak, isn't it?' I believe he meant that was the kind of inside information that my late partner, Rowland Evans, and I had featured in our column for so long. I interpreted that as meaning Armitage expected to see the item published in my column."

On November 11, 2007, Armitage appeared on Late Edition with Wolf Blitzer and was asked to respond to Valerie Wilson's assertion that Armitage "did a very foolish thing" in revealing her identity to Novak. Armitage and Blitzer had the following exchange:

ARMITAGE: They're not words on which I disagree. I think it was extraordinarily foolish of me. There was no ill-intent on my part and I had never seen ever, in 43 years of having a security clearance, a covert operative's name in a memo. The only reason I knew a "Mrs. Wilson", not "Mrs. Plame", worked at the agency was because I saw it in a memo. But I don't disagree with her words to a large measure.

BLITZER: Normally in memos they don't name covert operatives?
ARMITAGE: I have never seen one named.
BLITZER: And so you assumed she was, what, just an analyst over at the CIA?
ARMITAGE: Not only assumed it, that's what the message said, that she was publicly chairing a meeting.
BLITZER: So, when you told Robert Novak that Joe Wilson, the former U.S. ambassador's wife, worked at the CIA, and she was involved somehow in getting him this trip to Africa to look for the enriched uranium, if there were enriched uranium going to Iraq, you simply assumed that she was not a clandestine officer of the CIA.
ARMITAGE: Well, even Mr. Novak has said that he used the word "operative" and misused it. No one ever said "operative." And I not only assumed it, as I say, I've never seen a covert agent's name in a memo. However, that doesn't take away from what Mrs. Plame said, it was foolish, yeah. Sure it was.
BLITZER: So you agree with her on that.

ARMITAGE: Yeah. Absolutely.

== Karl Rove ==
In July 2005, it was revealed that Karl Rove was Novak's second Bush administration source.

In his grand jury testimony, Rove testified he learned of Plame's CIA affiliation from journalists and not from government officials. Rove testified that Novak called him in July 2003 to discuss a story unrelated to Plame or Wilson. Eventually, according to Rove, Novak told him he planned to report in an upcoming column that Plame worked for the CIA. Rove told the grand jury that by the time Novak had called him, he had already learned of Plame from other reporters, but that he could not recall which reporters had told him. When Novak inquired about Wilson's wife working for the CIA, Rove indicated he had heard something like that, according to the source's recounting of the grand jury testimony for the Associated Press. Rove told the grand jury that three days later, he had a phone conversation with Time magazine reporter Matt Cooper and, in an effort to discredit some of Wilson's allegations, informally told Cooper that he believed Wilson's wife worked for the CIA, though he never used her name. Rove also testified to the grand jury that he had heard from Libby that Plame worked for the CIA. Rove testified that Libby told him that he heard the information from journalists.

The indictment of Libby states: "On or about July 10 or July 11, 2003, LIBBY spoke to a senior official in the White House ("Official A") who advised LIBBY of a conversation Official A had earlier that week with columnist Robert Novak in which Wilson's wife was discussed as a CIA employee involved in Wilson's trip. LIBBY was advised by Official A that Novak would be writing a story about Wilson's wife." Though never confirmed by Fitzgerald, it has been reported that Rove was "Official A."

Shortly after the publication of Novak's article, Rove also reportedly called Chris Matthews and told him off the record that "Wilson's wife is fair game."

On July 2, 2005, Rove's lawyer, Robert Luskin, confirmed that Rove spoke to Time reporter Matt Cooper "three or four days" before Plame's identity was first revealed in print by commentator Robert Novak. Cooper's article in Time, citing unnamed and anonymous "government officials", confirmed Plame to be a "CIA official who monitors the proliferation of weapons of mass destruction." Cooper's article appeared three days after Novak's column was published. Rove's lawyer asserted that Rove "never knowingly disclosed classified information" and that "he did not tell any reporter that Valerie Plame worked for the CIA." Luskin also has said that his client did not initiate conversations with reporters about Plame and did not encourage reporters to write about her.

Initially, Rove failed to tell the grand jury about his conversations with Cooper. According to Rove, he only remembered he had spoken to Cooper after discovering a July 11, 2003, White House e-mail that Rove had written to then-deputy National Security advisor Stephen J. Hadley in which Rove said he had spoken to Cooper about the Niger controversy. Luskin also testified before the grand jury. He told prosecutors that Time reporter Viveca Novak had told him prior to Rove's first grand jury appearance that she had heard from colleagues at Time that Rove was one of the sources for Cooper's story about Plame. Luskin in turn said that he told Rove about this, though Rove still did not disclose to the grand jury that he had ever spoken to Cooper about Plame. Viveca Novak testified she couldn't recall when she spoke to Luskin. Rove testified a total of five times before the federal grand jury investigating the leak. After Rove's last appearance, Luskin released a statement that read in part: "In connection with this appearance, the special counsel has advised Mr. Rove that he is not a target of the investigation. Mr. Fitzgerald has affirmed that he has made no decision concerning charges."

On July 11, 2006, Novak confirmed that Rove was his second source for his article that revealed the identity of Plame as a CIA agent, the source who confirmed what Armitage had told him.

On February 12, 2007, Novak testified in Libby's trial. As Michael J. Sniffen of the Associated Press reports: "Novak testified he got confirmation from White House political adviser Karl Rove, who replied to him: 'Oh, you've heard that, too.' "

Court documents reveal that in December 2004, Fitzgerald was considering pursuing perjury charges against Rove.

On July 8, 2007, Rove spoke publicly about the investigation at the Aspen Ideas Festival question-and-answer session. Rove told the audience "My contribution to this was to say to a reporter, which is a lesson about talking to reporters, the words 'I heard that too,' ... Remember, the underlying offense of Armitage talking to Novak was no violation. There was no indictment."

On August 19, 2007, Rove was asked by David Gregory on Meet the Press about whether Rove considered Plame to be "fair game". Rove replied "No. And you know what? Fair game, that wasn't my phrase. That's a phrase of a journalist. In fact, a colleague of yours." Rove has not denied he had a conversation with Matthews. Newsweek reported in October 2003 that a source familiar with Rove's side of the conversation told Newsweek that Rove told Matthews it was "reasonable to discuss who sent [Joe] Wilson to Niger."

After announcing his resignation from the Bush Administration, Rove appeared on Fox News Sunday and Meet the Press, and discussed his role in the Plame affair. According to Rove, he didn't believe he was a confirming source for Robert Novak and Matt Cooper with regard to Plame. Rove also reiterated that he first learned of Plame from another reporter, though would not disclose which reporter. Rove told Gregory "I acted in an appropriate manner, made all the appropriate individuals aware of my contact. I met with the FBI right at the beginning of this, told them everything. You're right, the special prosecutor declined to take any action at all. I was never a target." Rove told Chris Wallace on Fox News Sunday "I didn't know her name, didn't know her status at the CIA."

In his memoir, Courage and Consequence, Rove devotes three chapters to Wilson's New York Times op-ed and subsequent grand jury investigation. Rove writes that before his third appearance before the grand jury, Robert Luskin went back and looked through all of Rove's saved emails from April through September 2003. Luskin, according to Rove, uncovered an email Rove had written to Steve Hadley in which Rove discussed a conversation he had had with Matt Cooper concerning Wilson's op-ed. Rove writes that while the "email didn't jog any better recollection of the call", he immediately told Fitzgerald, after being sworn in, that he wanted to "set the record straight." After presenting the email to Fitzgerald, Rove writes that "it was as if I'd detonated a bomb in the shabby little room." Rove writes that before his fourth appearance before the grand jury he received a "target warning" by Fitzgerald. Rove describes his fourth appearance as "brutal from the first moment", and that the grand jury "hung on Fitzgerald's every word." After Rove's testimony, Fitzgerald told Luskin "All things being equal, we are inclined to indict your client." According to Rove, Luskin and Fitzgerald meet for hours in Chicago on October 20 to discuss the matter. At some point during the meeting, "Fitzgerald turned to what was really bothering him: my conversation with Matt Cooper. Was I lying about not being able to recall my phone conversation with him the morning of July 11, 2003?" Specifically, Rove writes, Fitzgerald wanted to know why "in December 2003 or January 2004 did I ask my aides ... to find any evidence of contact with Matt Cooper." It was at this moment, according to Rove, that Luskin revealed his conversation with Viveca Novak in which Luskin learned that Cooper "had insisted around Time's Washington bureau that he had talked to [Rove about Plame]." Luskin then revealed to Fitzgerald that it was he who instructed Rove to have his aides find any records of that contact. According to Rove, Fitzgerald was "stunned", and stated to Luskin, "You rocked my world." Rove writes that it "was clear Fitzgerald had originally intended to indict Libby and me on the same day." Rove also writes that in the end, Luskin had a "charitable view of Fitzgerald ... the prosecutor never leaked, and he treated Luskin with respect and was forthcoming about his evidence and concerns."

== I. Lewis "Scooter" Libby ==
The grand jury Investigation indictment of Libby states:

Beginning in or about January 2004, and continuing until the date of this indictment, Grand Jury 03-3 sitting in the District of Columbia conducted an investigation ("the Grand Jury Investigation") into possible violations of federal criminal laws, including: Title 50, United States Code, Section 421 (disclosure of the identity of covert intelligence personnel); and Title 18, United States Code, Sections 793 (improper disclosure of national defense information), 1001 (false statements), 1503 (obstruction of justice), and 1623 (perjury). A major focus of the Grand Jury Investigation was to determine which government officials had disclosed to the media prior to July 14, 2003, information concerning the affiliation of Valerie Wilson with the CIA, and the nature, timing, extent, and purpose of such disclosures, as well as whether any official making such a disclosure did so knowing that the employment of Valerie Wilson by the CIA was classified information.

According to Special Counsel Patrick Fitzgerald, Libby first learned of Valerie Wilson's employment at the CIA in early June 2003 from Vice President Dick Cheney and proceeded to discuss her with six other government officials in the following days and months before disclosing her name to reporters Judith Miller and Matthew Cooper in early July 2003. Fitzgerald asserts that Vice President Cheney told Libby about Mrs. Wilson's CIA employment as the two crafted a response to an inquiry about Wilson's trip from reporter Walter Pincus. While her name was not disclosed to Pincus, Fitzgerald asserts that Pincus's inquiry "further motivated [Libby] to counter Mr. Wilson's assertions, making it more likely that [Libby's] disclosures to the press concerning Mr. Wilson's wife were not casual disclosures that he had forgotten by the time he was asked about them by the Federal Bureau of Investigation and before the grand jury."

Libby does not dispute that he initially heard about Mrs. Wilson from Cheney, but he claims that he had no recollection of that fact when he told the FBI in October 2003 and the grand jury in March 2004 that he remembered first learning about Mrs. Wilson in a conversation with NBC's Tim Russert on July 10, 2003.

Libby told the grand jury "it seemed to me as if I was learning it for the first time" when, according to his account, Russert told him about Plame on July 10 or 11, 2003. Only later, when looking at his calendar and notes, Libby said, did he remember that he actually learned the information from Cheney in June 2003. Libby told the grand jury: "In the course of the document production, the FBI sent us a request for documents, or Justice Department, I'm not sure technically. In the course of that document production I came across the note that is dated on or about June 12, and the note ... shows that I hadn't first learned it from Russert, although that was my memory, I had first learned it when he said it to me." The note Libby referred to contains no suggestion that either Cheney or Libby knew at the time of Ms. Wilson's undercover status or that her identity was classified, but they do show that Cheney did know and told Libby that Ms. Wilson was employed by the CIA and that she may have helped arrange her husband's trip.

Testifying as a prosecution witness, Russert said that although he and Libby did indeed speak on July 10, 2003, they never discussed Plame during their conversation. Libby had claimed he had forgotten by the time of the conversation with Russert that he had earlier learned Ms. Plame's job from Cheney around June 12, 2003. Libby also testified to the federal grand jury that when Russert purportedly told him about Plame, he had absolutely no memory of having heard the information earlier from anyone else, including Cheney, and was thus "taken aback" when Russert told him. Libby told the FBI that Russert told him on July 10 or 11, 2003, that she worked at the CIA and "all the reporters knew that." In his opening argument, Fitzgerald, referring to Libby's conversation with Russert on July 10, said: "You can't be startled about something on Thursday [July 10] that you told other people about on Monday [July 7] and Tuesday [July 8]." Former White House press secretary Ari Fleischer testified as a prosecution witness that on July 7, 2003, Libby told Fleischer, "Ambassador Wilson was sent by his wife. His wife works for the CIA." Fleischer testified that Libby referred to Wilson's wife by her maiden name, Valerie Plame, and "he added it was hush-hush, on the Q.T., and that most people didn't know it." Libby was also alleged by prosecutors to have lied to the FBI and a federal grand jury in claiming that when he mentioned Plame's name to two reporters—Matthew Cooper, then of Time magazine, and Judith Miller, then of The New York Times—he was careful to point out to them he was simply repeating rumors that he had heard from Russert. Cooper and Miller testified that Libby stated no such qualifications to them in telling them about Plame.

During Libby's trial, Libby's lawyers argued that Libby's testimony to the grand jury and his interviews with the Federal Bureau of Investigation may have contained inaccuracies but that they were the result of innocent memory lapses explained by his pressing schedule of national security issues. Libby's defense lawyers also challenged the memory and recollections of each prosecution witness.

According to press accounts, Cheney told investigators that he had learned of Mrs. Wilson's employment by the CIA and her potential role in her husband being sent to Niger from then-CIA director George Tenet, though it's unclear whether Cheney was made aware of her classified status. Tenet has told investigators that he had no specific recollection of discussing Plame or her role in her husband's trip with Cheney. Tenet did recall, however, that he made inquiries regarding the veracity of the Niger intelligence information as a result of inquires from both Cheney and Libby. According to press accounts, Libby told investigators that on July 12, 2003, while aboard Air Force Two, he and Cheney may have discussed leaking information about Plame to reporters. Libby told investigators he believed at the time that the information about Plame had come from Russert. After arriving back in Washington, according to Cooper's and Miller's testimony at Libby's trial, Libby spoke to both of them by telephone and confirmed to them that Plame worked for the CIA and may have played a role in sending her husband to Niger. FBI agent Deborah Bond testified at Libby's trial that during Libby's second FBI interview in his office on November 23, 2003, Libby was asked about the July 12 flight. Bond testified Libby told the FBI "there was a discussion whether to report to the press that Wilson's wife worked for the CIA." She added that Mr. Libby expressed some doubt, however, adding "Mr. Libby told us he believed they may have talked about it, but he wasn't sure." She testified that Libby did say he had discussed Wilson's wife with Cheney sometime after allegedly discussing her with Russert. Libby reportedly told investigators that neither the president nor the vice president specifically directed him or other administration officials to disclose Plame's CIA employment to the press.

According to court documents, by December 2004 Fitzgerald lacked evidence to prove Libby had violated the Intelligence Identities Protection Act and was pursuing charges related to "perjury, false statements and the improper disclosure of national defense information."

During Libby's trial, the prosecution focused the jury on a sequence of events occurring between May and July 2003. According to prosecutors, given the level of interest coming from the Vice President's office regarding Joe Wilson, it was impossible for Libby to have forgotten during his FBI interviews and grand jury testimony that he already knew that Wilson's wife worked for the CIA.

=== Conviction ===
On March 6, 2007, Libby was found guilty on four of the five counts against him.

==== Jury reaction ====
After the verdict was read to the court, Denis Collins, a member of the jury and a journalist who has written for The Washington Post and other newspapers, spoke to the press. According to Collins, some in the jury felt sympathy for Libby and believed he was only the "fall guy". Collins said that "a number of times" the jurors asked themselves, "what is [Libby] doing here? Where is Rove and all these other guys. I'm not saying we didn't think Mr. Libby was guilty of the things we found him guilty of. It seemed like he was, as Mr. Wells [Ted Wells, Libby's attorney] put it, he was the fall guy."

According to Collins,

What we're in court deciding seems to be a level or two down from what, before we went into the jury, we supposed the trial was about, or had been initially about, which was who leaked [Plame's identity]. Some jurors commented at some point: 'I wish we weren't judging Libby. You know, this sucks. We don't like being here.' But that wasn't our choice.

Collins described how after 10 days of deliberations,

What we came up with from that was that Libby was told about Mrs. Wilson nine times ... We believed he did have a bad memory, but it seemed very unlikely he would not remember about being told about Mrs. Wilson so many times ... Hard to believe he would remember on Tuesday and forget on Thursday.

Collins told the press "Well, as I said before, I felt like it was a long, you know, haul to get this jury done. And if Mr. Libby is pardoned, I would have no problem with that."

Another member of the jury, Ann Redington, who broke down and cried as the verdict was being read, also told Chris Matthews, in a March 7, 2007, appearance on Hardball, that she hoped Libby would eventually be pardoned by President Bush; she told Matthews that she believed Libby "got caught in a difficult situation where he got caught in the initial lie, and it just snowballed" and added: "It kind of bothers me that there was this whole big crime being investigated and he got caught up in the investigation as opposed to in the actual crime that was supposedly committed."

==== Sentencing ====
On May 25, 2007, in a court filing, Fitzgerald asked Judge Reggie B. Walton to sentence Libby to 30 to 37 months in jail, because Libby had "expressed no remorse, no acceptance of responsibility and no recognition that there is anything he should have done differently." Fitzgerald stated "Mr. Libby was a high-ranking government official whose falsehoods were central to issues in a significant criminal investigation, it is important that this court impose a sentence that accurately reflects the value the judicial system places on truth-telling in criminal investigations." The defense sought leniency based on Libby's record of public service.

The Probation Office's recommended sentence to Judge Walton was cited in court documents to be no more than 15 to 21 months of incarceration. According to court documents, the Probation Office states its opinion that the more serious sentencing standards should not apply to Libby since "the criminal offense would have to be established by a preponderance of the evidence, ... [and] the defendant was neither charged nor convicted of any crime involving the leaking of Ms. Plame's 'covert' status."

On June 5, 2007, Libby was sentenced to 30 months in prison, a fine of US$250,000, and two years of probation (supervised release) after the expiration of his prison term. According to The Washington Post, Judge Walton expressed his belief that the trial did not prove Libby knew that Plame worked in an undercover capacity when he disclosed her identity to several reporters. He added, however, that "anybody at that high-level position had a unique and special obligation before they said anything about anything associated with a national security agency [to] ... make every conceivable effort" to verify their status before releasing information about them. Walton stated "While there is no evidence that Mr. Libby knew what the situation was, he surely did not take any efforts to find out, ... I think public officials need to know if they are going to step over the line, there are going to be consequences. ... [What Libby did] causes people to think our government does not work for them."

==== Bush commutes sentence ====
On July 2, 2007, President Bush commuted the sentence. No pardon was given, and the fine and probation, as well as the felony conviction remain. The statement said:

Mr. Libby was sentenced to thirty months of prison, two years of probation, and a $250,000 fine. In making the sentencing decision, the district court rejected the advice of the probation office, which recommended a lesser sentence and the consideration of factors that could have led to a sentence of home confinement or probation. I respect the jury's verdict. But I have concluded that the prison sentence given to Mr. Libby is excessive. Therefore, I am commuting the portion of Mr. Libby's sentence that required him to spend thirty months in prison. My decision to commute his prison sentence leaves in place a harsh punishment for Mr. Libby.

On July 5, 2007, it was reported that Libby had sent a cashier's check dated July 2 in the amount of $250,400 to the court clerk of the District of Columbia. NBC News reported that Libby paid the fine through his personal funds and not through a defense fund set up in his name.

On July 12, 2007, President Bush held a press conference and was asked about his commutation of Libby's prison sentence. Bush told reporters:

First of all, the Scooter Libby decision was, I thought, a fair and balanced decision. Secondly, I haven't spent a lot of time talking about the testimony that people throughout my administration were forced to give as a result of the special prosecutor. I didn't ask them during the time and I haven't asked them since. I'm aware of the fact that perhaps somebody in the administration did disclose the name of that person, and I've often thought about what would have happened had that person come forth and said, I did it. Would we have had this, you know, endless hours of investigation and a lot of money being spent on this matter? But it's been a tough issue for a lot of people in the White House, and it's run its course and now we're going to move on.

In December 2007, Libby, through his attorney Theodore Wells, announced he had dropped his appeal of his conviction. A statement released by Wells read "We remain firmly convinced of Mr. Libby's innocence. However, the realities were, that after five years of government service by Mr. Libby and several years of defending against this case, the burden on Mr. Libby and his young family of continuing to pursue his complete vindication are too great to ask them to bear." Wells also stated that an appeal "would lead only to a retrial, a process that would last even beyond the two years of supervised release, cost millions of dollars more than the fine he has already paid, and entail many more hundreds of hours preparing for an all-consuming appeal and retrial."

Press reports indicated that Vice President Cheney "repeatedly pressed Bush to pardon Libby" to no avail in the final days of the Bush administration. Cheney told The Weekly Standard, "[Libby] was the victim of a serious miscarriage of justice, and I strongly believe that he deserved a presidential pardon. Obviously, I disagree with President Bush's decision." Cheney was reportedly "furious" with Bush over his decision not to pardon Libby.

==== Trump pardon ====
On April 13, 2018, President Donald Trump pardoned Scooter Libby, saying, "I don't know Mr. Libby, but for years, I have heard that he has been treated unfairly ... Hopefully, this full pardon will help rectify a very sad portion of his life." In response to news of the pardon, Valerie Plame stated, "Trump's pardon is not based on the truth," and case prosecutor Fitzgerald also said in a statement that Trump's decision to pardon Libby "purports to be premised on the notion that Libby was an innocent man convicted on the basis of inaccurate testimony caused by the prosecution. That is false."

== Ari Fleischer ==
In January 2007, during the first week of Scooter Libby's trial, it was revealed in court proceedings that former White House Press Secretary Ari Fleischer was granted immunity from prosecution by Patrick Fitzgerald in February 2004. Fleischer reportedly acknowledged discussing Valerie Plame with reporters, but promised to cooperate with Fitzgerald's investigation only if granted immunity. When the deal was struck, Fleischer told Fitzgerald that he had discussed Plame with David Gregory of NBC News and John Dickerson of Time in July 2003, days before leaving his job at the White House. Fleischer testified that he first learned about Plame and her CIA affiliation during a July 7, 2003, lunch with Libby. Fleischer also testified that four days later, while aboard Air Force One and during a five-day trip to several African nations, he overheard Dan Bartlett reference Plame. According to Fleischer, Bartlett stated to no one in particular "His wife sent him ... She works at the CIA." Shortly after overhearing Bartlett, Fleischer proceeded to discuss Plame with Gregory and Dickerson. According to Fleischer, neither Gregory nor Dickerson showed much interest in the information. Dickerson has denied Fleischer's account. Gregory has declined to comment on the matter. With regard to the immunity deal, Fitzgerald told the court "I didn't want to give [Fleischer] immunity. I did so reluctantly." Libby's attorney, William Jeffress, sought to learn more about the deal, telling the court "I'm not sure we're getting the full story here." According to Matt Apuzzo of the Associated Press, "Prosecutors normally insist on an informal account of what a witness will say before agreeing to such a deal. It's known in legal circles as a proffer, and Fitzgerald said [in court] he never got one from Fleischer."

== Dick Cheney ==
In the closing arguments of Libby's trial, defense lawyer Ted Wells told the jury "The government in its questioning really tried to put a cloud over Vice President Cheney ... And the clear suggestion by the questions were, well, maybe there was some kind of skullduggery, some kind of scheme between Libby and the vice president going on in private, but that's unfair." Patrick Fitzgerald responded to this assertion by telling the jury, "You know what? [Wells] said something here that we're trying to put a cloud on the vice president. We'll talk straight. There is a cloud over the vice president. He sent Libby off to [meet with former New York Times reporter] Judith Miller at the St. Regis Hotel. At that meeting, the two-hour meeting, the defendant talked about the wife [Plame]. We didn't put that cloud there. That cloud remains because the defendant obstructed justice and lied about what happened."

At a press conference after the verdict was read, Fitzgerald was asked about his statement to the jury that there is a "cloud" over the vice president. Fitzgerald stated:

What was said in court was a defense argument made that we put a cloud over the White House, as if, one, we were inventing something or, two, making something up, in order to convince the jury that they ought to convict. And I think in any case where you feel that someone's making an argument that you are inventing something or improperly casting a cloud on someone, you respond. And we responded fairly and honestly by saying there was a cloud there caused by – not caused by us. And by Mr. Libby obstructing justice and lying about what happened, he had failed to remove the cloud. And sometimes when people tell the truth, clouds disappear. And sometimes they don't. But when you don't know what's happening, that's a problem. And so the fact that there was a cloud over anyone was not our doing. It was the facts of the case. It was the facts of the case. It was aggravated by Mr. Libby telling falsehoods. And that's what we said. We're not going to add to that or subtract to that. That's what we said in court, and that's the context in which we said it.

After the trial ended, Citizens for Responsibility and Ethics in Washington (CREW) attempted to have the transcript of Cheney's interview with the special prosecutor released. The release was opposed by the Bush administration. In July 2009, the Department of Justice filed a motion with United States District Court for the District of Columbia stating that the position of the Obama administration was that the transcript should not be released. In the motion, the DOJ states:

Therefore, if law enforcement interviews of the President, Vice President or other senior White House officials become subject to routine public disclosure, even upon the conclusion of an investigation, there is an increased likelihood that such officials could feel reluctant to participate in voluntary interviews or, if they agree to such voluntary interviews, could decline to answer questions on certain topics.

In October 2009, the courts ruled in CREW's favor and the US Justice Department was required to release a transcript of Cheney's testimony to the FBI regarding the Plame affair. According to Cheney's testimony, Cheney could not recall information 72 times. This included that Cheney could not remember discussing Valerie Plame with Scooter Libby, although Mr. Libby testified that he remembered discussing Valerie Plame with Cheney on two occasions. Cheney had considerable disdain for the CIA, as he spoke of the incompetence of the organization, and three times said "amateur hour" in reference to CIA actions. Some observers say that Cheney's faulty memory was his method to avoid telling the truth, and to avoid potential prosecution. In closing arguments at Libby's trial, special prosecutor Patrick Fitzgerald said "a cloud over the vice president, persisted."

According to the court released transcript:

The Vice President repeated that he believes he first heard about Joe Wilson's wife's employment in the telephone conversation he had with DCI Tenet.

The vice president repeated that any decisions about whether Libby, when talking to the media, provides information on the record or on background are made by Libby himself.

The vice president believed he read the Robert Novak column in the newspaper on the day it was published, 7/14/03. He cannot recall discussing it or any of its contents with anyone at the time it was published. He did not pay any particular attention to Novak's disclosure of the identity of Valerie Wilson, and he does not know how Novak might have received such information. He emphasized it did not appear to him to be an important or even relevant fact in the Joe Wilson controversy.

The Vice President advised that it was conceivable that he may have had discussions about Joe Wilson during the week of 7/6/03 because the Tenet statement covered the bulk of the Wilson matter, namely that the CIA had dispatched Wilson to Niger on its own without direction from the Vice President; Wilson's report had confirmed there had been an approach by Iraq to Niger at one time; and the results of Wilson's trip were not briefed to the Vice President.

Vice President Cheney advised that no one ever told him that Wilson went to Niger because of his wife's CIA status and, in fact, the Vice President does not have any idea to this day why Joseph Wilson was selected to go to Niger.

The Vice President advised that there were no discussions of pushing back on Wilson's credibility by raising the nepotism issue, and there was no discussion of using Valerie Wilson's employment with the CIA in countering Joe Wilson's criticisms and claims about Iraqi efforts to procure yellow cake uranium from Niger.

== Journalists subpoenaed to testify in Fitzgerald's grand jury investigation ==
In a January 23, 2006, letter to Scooter Libby's defense team, Patrick Fitzgerald states: "... [W]e advised you during the January 18 conference call that we were not aware of any reporters who knew prior to July 14, 2003, that Valerie Plame, Ambassador Wilson's wife, worked at the CIA, other than: Bob Woodward, Judith Miller, Bob Novak, Walter Pincus and Matthew Cooper."

=== Bob Woodward ===
On November 16, 2005, in an article titled "Woodward Was Told of Plame More Than Two Years Ago", published in The Washington Post, Jim VandeHei and Carol D. Leonnig revealed that Bob Woodward was told of Valerie Wilson's CIA affiliation a month before it was reported in Robert Novak's column and before Wilson's July 6, 2003 editorial in The New York Times. At an on-the-record dinner at a Harvard University Institute of Politics forum in December 2005, according to the Harvard Crimson, Woodward discussed the matter with fellow Watergate reporter Carl Bernstein, responding to Bernstein's claim that the release of Plame's identity was a "calculated leak" by the Bush administration with "I know a lot about this, and you're wrong." The Crimson also states that "when asked at the dinner whether his readers should worry that he has been 'manipulated' by the Bush administration, Woodward replied, 'I think you should worry. I mean, I worry.'"

Although it had been reported in mid-November 2005 that Novak's source was National Security Advisor Stephen Hadley, almost a year later media reports revealed that the source of this information was Richard Armitage, which Armitage himself also confirmed.

On February 12, 2007, Woodward testified in "Scooter" Libby's trial as a defense witness. While on the witness stand, an audiotape was played for the jury that contained the interview between Armitage and Woodward in which Plame was discussed. The following exchange is heard on the tape:

WOODWARD: But it was Joe Wilson who was sent by the agency. I mean that's just —

ARMITAGE: His wife works in the agency.
WOODWARD: Why doesn't that come out? Why does —
ARMITAGE: Everyone knows it.
WOODWARD: — that have to be a big secret? Everyone knows.
ARMITAGE: Yeah. And I know Joe Wilson's been calling everybody. He's pissed off because he was designated as a low-level guy, went out to look at it. So, he's all pissed off.
WOODWARD: But why would they send him?
ARMITAGE: Because his wife's a [expletive] analyst at the agency.
WOODWARD: It's still weird.
ARMITAGE: It — It's perfect. This is what she does she is a WMD analyst out there.
WOODWARD: Oh she is.
ARMITAGE: Yeah.
WOODWARD: Oh, I see.
ARMITAGE: Yeah. See?
WOODWARD: Oh, she's the chief WMD?
ARMITAGE: No she isn't the chief, no.
WOODWARD: But high enough up that she can say, "Oh yeah, hubby will go."
ARMITAGE: Yeah, he knows Africa.
WOODWARD: Was she out there with him?
ARMITAGE: No.
WOODWARD: When he was ambassador?

ARMITAGE: Not to my knowledge. I don't know. I don't know if she was out there or not. But his wife is in the agency and is a WMD analyst. How about that [expletive].

=== Judith Miller ===
The New York Times reporter Judith Miller also claims to have learned Plame's CIA affiliation from Scooter Libby. Though she never published an article on the topic, Miller spent twelve weeks in jail when she was found in contempt of court for refusing to divulge the identity of her source to Fitzgerald's grand jury after he subpoenaed her testimony. Miller told the court, before being ordered to jail, "If journalists cannot be trusted to keep confidences, then journalists cannot function and there cannot be a free press." Miller was released from jail on September 29, 2005, after Libby assured her in a telephone call that a waiver he gave prosecutors authorizing them to question reporters about their conversations with him was not coerced. Libby also wrote Miller a letter while she was in jail urging her to cooperate with the special prosecutor. The letter has come under scrutiny, and Fitzgerald asked Miller about it during her grand jury testimony. Fitzgerald attempted to enter the letter into evidence at Libby's trial, arguing it showed Libby tried to influence her prospective testimony to the grand jury. Judge Walton ruled it inadmissible.

Miller testified twice before the grand jury and wrote an account of her testimony for The New York Times.

In her testimony at Libby's trial, Miller reiterated that she learned of Plame from Libby on June 23, 2003, during an interview at the Old Executive Office Building, and on July 8, 2003, during a breakfast meeting at the St. Regis Hotel in Washington D.C. At the July 8 meeting, which occurred two days after Joe Wilson's op-ed in The New York Times, Libby told the grand jury "that he was specifically authorized in advance ... to disclose the key judgments of the classified [October 2002] NIE to Miller" to rebut Wilson's charges. Libby "further testified that he at first advised the Vice President that he could not have this conversation with reporter Miller because of the classified nature of the NIE", but testified "that the Vice President had advised [Libby] that the President had authorized [Libby] to disclose relevant portions of the NIE."

Miller was pressed by the defense at Libby's trial about conversations she may have had with other officials regarding the Wilsons. Miller also testified that after her conversation with Libby, she went to The New York Times managing editor Jill Abramson and suggested the Times look into Wilson's wife. Abramson, however, testified at the trial that she had "no recollection of such a conversation."

According to Denver criminal defense attorney Jeralyn Merritt, a press-accredited blogger who attended the trial, "After Judith Miller's testimony, Libby lawyer Ted Wells told the judge he would be moving for a judgment of acquittal on a count pertaining to her." Neil A. Lewis reported in The New York Times on February 9, 2007, that "The Libby defense won a victory of sorts when Judge Reggie B. Walton agreed to exclude part of one of the five felony counts against Mr. Libby. But it remained unclear whether the change, which was not contested by the prosecutors, would matter in jury deliberations," and some speculated that Libby's conversation with Miller would be dropped from count 1 of the indictment. At Libby's sentencing hearing, Libby's lawyers filed a response to the Government's sentencing request. Libby's filing read, in part, "At the close of the government's case, the defense moved to dismiss from the indictment the allegation that Mr. Libby had lied about his July 12 conversation with Ms. Miller, because the evidence did not support this allegation. The government did not oppose this motion, and the Court granted it."

After the verdict was read, a juror told the press that while Miller's memory may have been bad, many on the jury felt sympathy for her due to the nature of her cross-examination. The juror also stated that Miller was deemed credible during deliberations because she had made notes of her meeting with Libby.

Judith Miller writes that Joe Tate, Libby's lawyer until the criminal trial, revealed to her in a 2014 interview that Fitzgerald had "twice offered to drop all charges against Libby if his client would 'deliver' Cheney to him." According to Miller, Tate stated that Fitzgerald told him, "unless you can deliver someone higher up-the vice president-I'm going forth with the indictment." Miller also writes that Fitzgerald declined to discuss the case with her."

On April 14, 2018, Judith Miller wrote an op-ed for Foxnews.com in which she detailed her reasoning for being "pleased" with President Trump's decision to pardon Scooter Libby.

=== Walter Pincus ===
Walter Pincus, a Washington Post columnist, has reported that he was told in confidence by an unnamed Bush administration official on July 12, 2003, two days before Novak's column appeared, that "the White House had not paid attention to former Ambassador Joseph Wilson's CIA-sponsored February 2002 trip to Niger because it was set up as a boondoggle by his wife, an analyst with the agency working on weapons of mass destruction." Because he did not believe it to be true, Pincus claims, he did not report the story in The Washington Post until October 12, 2003: "I wrote my October story because I did not think the person who spoke to me was committing a criminal act, but only practicing damage control by trying to get me to stop writing about Wilson. Because of that article, The Washington Post and I received subpoenas last summer from Patrick J. Fitzgerald."

On February 12, 2007, Pincus testified during Libby's trial that he learned Wilson's wife worked at the CIA from Ari Fleischer. According to Pincus, Fleischer "suddenly swerved off" topic during an interview to tell him of her employment. Fleischer, who was called to testify by the prosecution, had earlier testified he told two reporters about Valerie Plame, but on cross-examination testified that he did not recall telling Pincus about Plame.

=== Matthew Cooper ===
Days after Novak's initial column appeared, Matthew Cooper of Time magazine published Plame's name, citing unnamed government officials as sources. In his article, titled "A War on Wilson?", Cooper raises the possibility that the White House has "declared war" on Wilson for speaking out against the Bush Administration. Cooper initially refused to testify before the grand jury, and was prepared to defy a court order and spend time in jail to protect his sources. At a court hearing, where Cooper was expected to be ordered to jail, Cooper told U.S. District Judge Thomas Hogan: "I am prepared to testify. I will comply. Last night I hugged my son good-bye and told him it might be a long time before I see him again. I went to bed ready to accept the sanctions." Cooper explained that before his court appearance, he had received "in somewhat dramatic fashion" a direct personal communication from his source freeing him from his commitment to keep the source's identity secret. In an interview with National Review, Robert Luskin, Rove's attorney, stated: "Cooper's lawyer called us and said, 'Can you confirm that the waiver [Rove originally signed in December 2003 or in January 2004] encompasses Cooper?' I was amazed ... So I said, 'Look, I understand that you want reassurances. If Fitzgerald would like Karl to provide you with some other assurances, we will.'" Cooper testified before the grand jury and wrote an account of his testimony for Time. Cooper told the grand jury his sources for his article, "A War on Wilson?", were Karl Rove and Scooter Libby.

During his appearance at Libby's trial, Cooper recounted how he first learned about Valerie Wilson on July 11, 2003, from Rove. Cooper testified that Rove told him to be wary of Joe Wilson's criticisms in The New York Times. "Don't go too far out on Wilson," Cooper recalled Rove saying, adding that Wilson's wife worked at "the agency." Rove reportedly ended the call by saying, "I've already said too much." Cooper testified that when he spoke to Libby, he told Libby that he had heard that Joe Wilson's wife worked at the C.I.A. According to Cooper, Libby responded, "I heard that too." In Libby's grand jury testimony, Libby recalled telling Cooper that he'd heard something to that effect but that he didn't know for sure if it were true. In Libby's trial, Cooper's notes became the subject of intense scrutiny by the defense.

Libby was acquitted on one count involving Cooper. A juror told the press that count three of the indictment came down to Libby's word versus Cooper's word, and thus provided enough reasonable doubt.

=== Tim Russert ===
According to Patrick Fitzgerald and the grand jury Investigation indictment, in his sworn testimony, Libby claimed to have heard of Plame's CIA status from Tim Russert.

Both Russert and Libby testified that Libby called Russert on July 10, 2003, to complain about the MSNBC program Hardball and comments that were made on that show about Libby and Cheney with regard to Wilson's Niger trip and subsequent op-ed. Libby contends, however, that at the end of that conversation, Russert asked him: "Did you know that Ambassador Wilson's wife works at the CIA? All the reporters know it."

At Libby's trial, Russert was questioned by prosecutors for only 12 minutes, but underwent more than five hours of pointed cross-examination over two days from defense attorney Theodore Wells Jr. Russert told prosecutors that he could not have told Libby about Plame because he had not heard of her until she was publicly revealed by Novak on July 14, 2003, four days after Russert spoke with Libby by phone. Wells challenged Russert's memory and his version of the events that led to his crucial grand jury testimony. Wells also questioned Russert about his reaction to the announcement of Libby's grand jury indictment.

Wells also focused on a November 24, 2003, report by John C. Eckenrode, the FBI Special Agent who interviewed Russert as part of the DOJ investigation. In that report, Eckenrode writes:

Russert does not recall stating to Libby, in this conversation, anything about the wife of former ambassador Joe Wilson. Although he could not completely rule out the possibility that he had such an exchange, Russert was at a loss to remember it, and moreover, he believes that this would be the type of conversation that he would or should remember. Russert acknowledged that he speaks to many people on a daily basis and it is difficult to reconstruct some specific conversations, particularly one which occurred several months ago.

Russert testified, however, that he does not believe that he said what Eckenrode reports; while he acknowledged on cross examination that he was not asked about any conversations he may have had with David Gregory or Andrea Mitchell regarding Plame during his deposition with Fitzgerald, he also told the jury that "they never came forward" to share with him anything they were learning about Joe Wilson or Valerie Plame from administration officials, and he testified that after Novak's column was published, the NBC Washington bureau (which he heads) debated whether pursuing Plame's role in the story would compromise her job at the CIA and ultimately decided to pursue the story.

According to multiple news accounts of the trial, Russert's testimony was key to Libby's conviction or acquittal, and on the day that the defense rested, February 14, 2007, the judge refused to allow the defense to call Russert back to the stand. A juror told the press that the members of the jury found Russert to be very credible in his testimony. "The primary thing that convinced us on most of the counts was the conversation, alleged conversation with Russert," the juror told the press.

== Legal issues relating to the CIA leak scandal ==
There are some major legal issues surrounding the allegations of illegality by administration officials in the CIA leak scandal, including Executive Order 12958, the Intelligence Identities Protection Act, the Espionage Act, Title 18 Section 641, conspiracy to impede or injure officers, the Classified Information Nondisclosure Agreement, other laws and precedents, perjury, conspiracy, obstruction of justice, and compelling the media to testify.

A topic of much public debate centered on whether Plame's CIA status fit the definition of "covert" outlined under Intelligence Identities Protection Act.

The government and Libby's defense filed sentencing memoranda after Libby's conviction. According to Fitzgerald:

First, it was clear from very early in the investigation that Ms. Wilson qualified under the relevant statute (Title 50, United States Code, Section 421) as a covert agent whose identity had been disclosed by public officials, including Mr. Libby, to the press. While not commenting on the reasons for the charging decisions as to any other persons, we can say that the reasons why Mr. Libby was not charged with an offense directly relating to his unauthorized disclosures of classified information regarding Ms. Wilson included, but were not limited to, the fact that Mr. Libby's false testimony obscured a confident determination of what in fact occurred, particularly where the accounts of the reporters with whom Mr. Libby spoke (and their notes) did not include any explicit evidence specifically proving that Mr. Libby knew that Ms. Wilson was a covert agent. On the other hand, there was clear proof of perjury and obstruction of justice which could be prosecuted in a relatively straightforward trial.

Libby's defense team countered:

Both of the sentencing memoranda the government filed on May 25, 2007 include unfounded assertions that Mr. Libby's conduct interfered with its ability to determine whether anyone had violated the IIPA or the Espionage Act ... We are necessarily hampered in our ability to counter the government's assertions regarding Ms. Wilson's status under the IIPA because the Court ruled – at the government's behest – that the defense was not entitled to discovery of the information necessary to challenge them. But even a review limited only to the publicly available information suggests that the conclusion the government touts as "fact" is subject to significant doubt.

The summary described above was provided to the defense along with a companion summary that defined a "covert" CIA employee as a "CIA employee whose employment is not publicly acknowledged by the CIA or the employee." It is important to bear in mind that the IIPA defines "covert agent" differently. It states: "The term 'covert agent' means— (A) a present or retired officer or employee of an intelligence agency ... (i) whose identity as such an officer, employee, or member is classified information, and (ii) who is serving outside the United States or has within the last five years served outside the United States." The CIA summary of Ms. Wilson's employment history claims that she "engaged in temporary duty (TDY) travel overseas on official business", though it does not say whether such travel in fact occurred within the last five years. Further, it is not clear that engaging in temporary duty travel overseas would make a CIA employee who is based in Washington eligible for protection under the IIPA. In fact, it seems more likely that the CIA employee would have to have been stationed outside the United States to trigger the protection of the statute. To our knowledge, the meaning of the phrase "served outside the United States" in the IIPA has never been litigated. Thus, whether Ms. Wilson was covered by the IIPA remains very much in doubt, especially given the sparse nature of the record.

== Congressional hearings ==
On March 8, 2007, two days after the verdict in the Libby trial, Congressman Henry Waxman, chair of the U.S. House Committee on Government Reform, announced that his committee would hold hearings and ask Plame to testify on March 16, in an effort by his committee to look into "whether White House officials followed appropriate procedures for safeguarding Plame's identity."

=== Valerie Wilson's testimony ===
On March 16, 2007, Valerie E. Wilson testified before the committee. Henry Waxman read a prepared statement that was cleared by CIA director Michael Hayden, which, in part, states:

During her employment at the CIA, Ms. Wilson was undercover. Her employment status with the CIA was classified information, prohibited from disclosure under Executive Order 12958. At the time of the publication of Robert Novak's column on July 14, 2003, Ms. Wilson's CIA employment status was covert. This was classified information. Ms. Wilson served in senior management positions at the CIA in which she oversaw the work for other CIA employees and she attained the level of GS-14—Step Six under the federal pay scale. Ms. Wilson worked on some of the most sensitive and highly secretive matters handled by the CIA. Ms. Wilson served at various times overseas for the CIA.

Mrs. Wilson's opening statement summarizes her employment with the CIA:

In the run-up to the war with Iraq, I worked in the Counterproliferation Division of the CIA, still as a covert officer whose affiliation with the CIA was classified. I raced to discover solid intelligence for senior policy makers on Iraq's presumed weapons of mass destruction program. While I helped to manage and run secret worldwide operations against this WMD target from CIA headquarters in Washington, I also traveled to foreign countries on secret missions to find vital intelligence."

In reply to the committee's request that she define the term "covert", she replied: "I'm not a lawyer, but my understanding is that the CIA is taking affirmative steps to ensure that there is no links between the operations officer and the Central Intelligence Agency."

When asked if she was ever told whether her status fit the definition under the Intelligence Identities Protection Act, Mrs. Wilson replied: "No," adding: "I'm not a lawyer, but I was covert. I did travel overseas on secret missions within the last five years ... [but] no, no one told me that [I fit the definition under the IIPA]."

Valerie Wilson also told the committee: "For those of us that were undercover in the CIA, we tended to use 'covert' or 'undercover' interchangeably. I'm not—we typically would not say of ourselves we were in a 'classified' position. You're kind of undercover or overt employees."

She told the committee that she believed that her "name and identity were carelessly and recklessly abused by senior officials in the White House and State Department." She testified that "I could count on one hand the number of people who knew where my true employer was the day that I was—my name was—and true affiliation was exposed in July 2003."

As a result of her exposure as a CIA operative, Mrs. Wilson testified: "I could no longer perform the work for which I had been highly trained." In reply to a question about whether or not she had any evidence government officials knew she was covert when disclosing her identity to reporters, Mrs. Wilson responded: "That, I think, is a question better put to the special prosecutor, Congressman."

=== Knodell's testimony ===
Dr. James Knodell, Director of the Office of Security at the White House, testified before the committee as well. He was asked whether the White House conducted any internal investigation, as is required by Executive Order 12958. Knodell said that he had started at the White House in August 2004, a year after the leak, but his records showed no evidence of a probe or report: "I have no knowledge of any investigation in my office," he said. When asked why no internal investigation was conducted or disciplinary actions taken after he took office, Knodell replied "there was already an outside investigation that was taking place, a criminal investigation. So that's why we took no action." In response to Knodell's testimony, Waxman sent a letter to White House Chief of Staff Joshua Bolten asking for clarification as to the "steps that the White House took following the disclosure of Ms. Wilson's identity."

According to Waxman: "Mr. Knodell could not explain, however, why the White House did not initiate an investigation after the security breach. It took months before a criminal investigation was initiated, yet according to Mr. Knodell, there was no White House investigation initiated during this period."

Citing Executive Order 12958, Waxman observes that the "White House is required to 'take appropriate and prompt corrective action' whenever there is a release of classified information." On September 29, 2003, approximately two and a half months after the disclosure of Plame's identity and subsequent filing of a crimes report by the CIA with the Justice Department, White House press secretary Scott McClellan told reporters: "The president believes leaking classified information is a very serious matter and it should be pursued to the fullest extent by the appropriate agency and the appropriate agency is the Department of Justice." McClellan also stated that the White House would not launch an internal probe and would not ask for an independent investigation into the matter.

=== Other testimony ===
Attorneys Mark Zaid and Victoria Toensing also testified before the committee. Each testified that Plame may not have been covert under the IIPA, and that the legal definition is more narrow than the general CIA designation. Zaid told the committee, "Mrs. Toensing is absolutely correct with many of her questions with respect to the Intelligence Identities Act, which has a very exacting standard. Mrs. Plame, as she indicated, was covert. That's a distinction between possibly under the Intelligence Identities Act, and that classified information was leaked. And the question then is it of a criminal magnitude versus something less than that and these could be any number of penalties."

Special Counsel Patrick Fitzgerald was also asked to testify. In a letter to Waxman, Fitzgerald responded to Waxman's request, in part stating:

I also do not believe it would be appropriate for me to offer opinions, as your letter suggests the committee may seek, about the ultimate responsibility of senior White House officials for the disclosure of Ms. Wilson's identity, or the sufficiency of the remedial measures that White House officials took after the leak. Prosecutors traditionally refrain from commenting outside of the judicial process on the actions of persons not charged with criminal offenses. Such individuals have significant privacy and due process interests that deserve protection as do the intemal deliberations of prosecutors relating to their conduct.

=== Reaction to hearing ===
According to Robert Novak, Rep. Peter Hoekstra and Hayden were in a conference together five days after the committee hearing. Novak reported that Hayden "did not answer whether Plame was covert under the terms of the Intelligence Identities Protection Act" when pressed by Hoekstra. Novak reported on April 12, 2007, that:

Hayden indicated to me he had not authorized Democratic Rep. Henry Waxman to say Plame had been a "covert" CIA employee, as he claimed Hayden did, but only that she was "undercover"... I obtained Waxman's talking points for the hearing. The draft typed after the Hayden-Waxman conversation said, "Ms. Wilson had a career as an undercover agent of the CIA." This was crossed out, the hand-printed change saying she 'was a covert employee of the CIA' ... Hayden told me that the talking points were edited by a CIA lawyer after conferring with Waxman's staff. "I am completely comfortable with that," the general assured me. He added he now sees no difference between "covert" and "undercover"... Mark Mansfield, Hayden's public affairs officer, next e-mailed me: "At CIA, you are either a covert or an overt employee. Ms. Wilson was a covert employee"... On March 21, Hoekstra again requested that the CIA define Plame's status. A written reply April 5 from Christopher J. Walker, the CIA's director of congressional affairs, said only that 'it is taking longer than expected' to reply because of "the considerable legal complexity required for this tasking."

== Possible consequences of the public disclosure of Wilson's CIA identity ==
There has been debate over what kinds of damage may have resulted from the public disclosure of Valerie Wilson's identity as a CIA operative in Novak's column and its fallout, how far and into what areas of national security and foreign intelligence that damage might extend, particularly vis-à-vis Plame's work with her cover company, Brewster Jennings & Associates. Plame has characterized the damage as "serious", noting, "I can tell you, all the intelligence services in the world that morning were running my name through their databases to see, 'Did anyone by this name come in the country? When? Do we know anything about it? Where did she stay? Well, who did she see?'" In an op-ed published by the Los Angeles Times, Joe Wilson wrote "She immediately started jotting down a checklist of things she needed to do to limit the damage to people she knew and to projects she was working on."

On October 3, 2004, The Washington Post quotes a former diplomat predicting immediate damage: "[E]very foreign intelligence service would run Plame's name through its databases within hours of its publication to determine if she had visited their country and to reconstruct her activities. ... That's why the agency is so sensitive about just publishing her name."

In contrast, in an October 27, 2005, appearance on Larry King Live, Bob Woodward commented: "They did a damage assessment within the CIA, looking at what this did that [former ambassador] Joe Wilson's wife [Plame] was outed. And turned out it was quite minimal damage. They did not have to pull anyone out undercover abroad. They didn't have to resettle anyone. There was no physical danger to anyone, and there was just some embarrassment."

In an appearance the next night, October 28, 2005, on Hardball, Andrea Mitchell was quoted as saying: "I happen to have been told that the actual damage assessment as to whether people were put in jeopardy on this case did not indicate that there was real damage in this specific instance."

Following Mitchell's appearance on Hardball, on October 29, 2005, The Washington Post's Dafna Linzer reported that no formal damage assessment had yet been conducted by the CIA "as is routinely done in cases of espionage and after any legal proceedings have been exhausted." Linzer writes: "There is no indication, according to current and former intelligence officials, that the most dire of consequences—the risk of anyone's life—resulted from her outing. But after Plame's name appeared in Robert D. Novak's column, the CIA informed the Justice Department in a simple questionnaire that the damage was serious enough to warrant an investigation, officials said."

Mark Lowenthal, who retired from a senior management position at the CIA in March 2005, reportedly told Linzer: "You can only speculate that if she had foreign contacts, those contacts might be nervous and their relationships with her put them at risk. It also makes it harder for other CIA officers to recruit sources."

Another intelligence official who spoke anonymously to Linzer cited the CIA's interest in protecting the agency and its work: "You'll never get a straight answer [from the Agency] about how valuable she was or how valuable her sources were."

On October 28, 2005, the Office of Special Counsel issued a press release regarding Libby's indictment. The following is stated regarding Plame:

Prior to July 14, 2003, Valerie Wilson's employment status was classified. Prior to that date, her affiliation with the CIA was not common knowledge outside the intelligence community. Disclosure of classified information about an individual's employment by the CIA has the potential to damage the national security in ways that range from preventing that individual's future use in a covert capacity, to compromising intelligence-gathering methods and operations, and endangering the safety of CIA employees and those who deal with them, the indictment states.

In a November 3, 2005, online live discussion, in response to a question about the Fitzgerald investigation, The Washington Post's Dana Priest, a Pulitzer Prize-winning journalist specializing in matters of national security, stated: "I don't actually think the Plame leak compromised national security, from what I've been able to learn about her position."

In a January 9, 2006, letter addressed to "Scooter" Libby's defense team, Patrick Fitzgerald responded to a discovery request by Libby's lawyers for both classified and unclassified documents. In the letter, Fitzgerald writes: "A formal assessment has not been done of the damage caused by the disclosure of Valerie Wilson's status as a CIA employee, and thus we possess no such document." He continues: "In any event, we would not view an assessment of the damage caused by the disclosure as relevant to the issue of whether or not Mr. Libby intentionally lied when he made the statements and gave the grand jury testimony which the grand jury alleged was false."

On March 16, 2007, Valerie Wilson told the House Committee on Oversight and Government Reform: "But I do know the Agency did a damage assessment. They did not share it with me, but I know that certainly puts the people and the contacts I had all in jeopardy, even if they were completely innocent in nature."

During Libby's trial, Judge Reggie Walton told the jury: "No evidence will be presented to you with regard to Valerie Plame Wilson's status. That is because what her actual status was, or whether any damage would result from disclosure of her status, are totally irrelevant to your decision of guilt or innocence. You must not consider these matters in your deliberations or speculate or guess about them." During court proceedings, when the jury was not present, Walton told the court: "I don't know, based on what has been presented to me in this case, what her status was. ... It's totally irrelevant to this case. ... I to this day don't know what her actual status was."

Larisa Alexandrovna Horton of Raw Story reports that three intelligence officials, who spoke under condition of anonymity, told her that

While Director of Central Intelligence Porter Goss has not submitted a formal damage assessment to Congressional oversight committees, the CIA's Directorate of Operations did conduct a serious and aggressive investigation.

According to her sources, "the damage assessment ... called a 'counter intelligence assessment to agency operations' was conducted on the orders of the CIA's then-Deputy Director of the Directorate of Operation James Pavitt ... [and showed] 'significant damage to operational equities.'"

Alexandrovna also reports that while Plame was undercover she was involved in an operation identifying and tracking weapons of mass destruction technology to and from Iran, suggesting that her outing "significantly hampered the CIA's ability to monitor nuclear proliferation." Her sources also stated that the outing of Plame also compromised the identity of other covert operatives who had been working, like Plame, under non-official cover status. These anonymous officials said that in their judgment, the CIA's work on WMDs has been set back "ten years" as a result of the compromise.

MSNBC correspondent David Shuster reported on Hardball later, on May 1, 2006, that MSNBC had learned "new information" about the potential consequences of the leaks: "Intelligence sources say Valerie Wilson was part of an operation three years ago tracking the proliferation of nuclear weapons material into Iran. And the sources allege that when Mrs. Wilson's cover was blown, the Administration's ability to track Iran's nuclear ambitions was damaged as well. The White House considers Iran to be one of America's biggest threats."

In March 2007, Richard Leiby and Walter Pincus reported, in The Washington Post, that Plame's work "included dealing with personnel as well as issues related to weapons of mass destruction in Iraq and Iran." CBS news would later confirm that Plame "was involved in operations to prevent Iran from building nuclear weapons", and may have been involved in Operation Merlin.

On September 6, 2006, David Corn published an article for The Nation titled "What Valerie Plame Really Did at the CIA", reporting that Plame was placed in charge of the operations group within the Joint Task Force on Iraq in the spring of 2001 and that, "when the Novak column ran", in July 2003: "Valerie Wilson was in the process of changing her clandestine status from NOC to official cover, as she prepared for a new job in personnel management. Her aim, she told colleagues, was to put in time as an administrator – to rise up a notch or two – and then return to secret operations. But with her cover blown, she could never be undercover again.

According to Vicky Ward, in an article for Vanity Fair, "In fact, in the spring [of 2003], Plame was in the process of moving from NOC status to State Department cover. [Joe] Wilson speculates that "if more people knew than should have, then somebody over at the White House talked earlier than they should have been talking."

In testifying before Congress, Valerie Wilson described the damage done by her exposure in the following way:

The CIA goes to great lengths to protect all of its employees, providing at significant taxpayers' expense painstakingly devised and creative covers for its most sensitive staffers. The harm that is done when a CIA cover is blown is grave, but I can't provide details beyond that in this public hearing. But the concept is obvious. Not only have breaches of national security endangered CIA officers, it has jeopardized and even destroyed entire networks of foreign agents, who in turn risk their own lives and those of their families to provide the United States with needed intelligence. Lives are literally at stake.

In her memoir, Fair Game: My Life as a Spy, My Betrayal by the White House, Valerie Plame Wilson states that after her covert and then-still-classified CIA identity "Valerie Plame" appeared in Novak's column in July 2003, she feared for her children's safety but was denied protection by the Agency. On October 26, 2005, her former CIA colleague Larry Johnson told Wolf Blitzer, on the CNN program The Situation Room, that she "had received death threats overseas from Al-Qaeda"; according to Johnson, after the FBI contacted her and told her of the threat made by al-Qaeda, she called the CIA and asked for security protection but was told: "you will have to rely upon 9-1-1."

On November 12, 2010, The Washington Post published a letter to the editor written by R.E. Pound. According to the Post, Pound served in the CIA from 1976 to 2009. Pound writes, "I was at one point charged with looking into possible damage in one location caused by Valerie Plame's outing. There was none. ... It was wrong to expose Plame. It was ludicrous for her to claim that the exposure forced an end to her career in intelligence."

In his memoir, Company Man: Thirty Years of Controversy and Crisis in the CIA, John A. Rizzo, a career lawyer at the CIA, details his involvement with the Plame investigation. According to Rizzo, after the CIA assessment of Novak's column, "the Plame leak appeared to be a most unlikely candidate for a full blown Justice/FBI investigation." Rizzo writes that there was "no evidence that any CIA source or operation-or Plame herself, for that matter-was placed in jeopardy as a result of the 'outing'." Rizzo also writes that "dozens if not hundreds of people knew she was an Agency employee." While describing Plame as a "capable, dedicated officer", Rizzo lays blame on her husband for the end of her CIA career. Rizzo also writes that it was he who declined Plame's request for round-the-clock security protection. According to Rizzo, there was "no credible information" indicating she was in any danger.

== In popular media ==
The events of the Plame affair were portrayed in the 2010 film Fair Game. The film was based on Plame's memoir and Joe Wilson's 2004 memoir The Politics of Truth.
