= Denis Collins (journalist) =

Denis Collins (March 17, 1949 – November 7, 2021) was an American journalist who wrote for The Washington Post, the San Jose Mercury News and the Miami Herald He was juror #9 in the trial of I. Lewis "Scooter" Libby, Jr., relating to the Plame affair, and was the first juror to comment publicly about the trial.

He was a reporter for The Washington Post and the author of two books: Spying: The Secret History of History and Nora's Army, about "a Bonus camp in 1932".

== Comment on the guilty verdict in the Libby trial ==
On March 6, 2007, the day of the guilty verdict, Collins was the first juror to give media interviews about his experience as a juror in the trial. In his first extended television interview, on Larry King Live, he told Larry King that he planned to write about the trial.

Subsequently, on March 7, 2007, he posted a seven-page "exclusive" article about his experience as "Juror #9" in The Huffington Post.

As reported in CNN Newsroom, and subsequently on Larry King Live, and by various other television networks, including MSNBC (on Scarborough Country), and as he elaborated later in his HuffPo article, Collins said, "[H]he and fellow jurors found that passing judgment on Libby was 'unpleasant.' But in the final analysis, he said jurors found Libby's story just too hard to believe.... 'We're not saying we didn't think Mr. Libby was guilty of the things we found him guilty of, but it seemed like ... he was the fall guy'.... Collins said the jury believed Libby was 'tasked by the vice president to go and talk to reporters.'"

A couple of days later, on March 9, 2007, in his article entitled "My Fifteen Minutes, All Because of Scooter", published in The Washington Post, he elaborated further about his experience as a juror in the Libby trial, reporting that, in the "green room" for Larry King Live, when he had a conversation with Matthew Cooper, who asked him why the jury acquitted Libby on count three (second charge of making false statements to federal investigators involving Cooper's testimony), Collins did not reveal that he himself "was the primary voice defending Libby on that charge". He also reviewed his own sudden media notoriety, explaining, "I spoke to the media because no one else on the jury would. Reporters wanted to know why. I couldn't answer for all the jurors. A few said they were just too overwhelmed.... When I finished talking to the media that first morning after our verdict, I knew that would not be the end of the story. But I wasn't prepared for the heat of the attention, especially from television shows. One woman from CNN was standing on my steps when I got home. "You're the only juror who's talking and the country wants to know more about the work of the jury....Let's be honest, I was ready to be seduced."

Later, concerning media criticism of his speaking about the trial to the media, he added, "I would speak no more forever. Just as soon as I finished the MSNBC "Countdown" appearance. As I walked into that studio, I was delighted to see my fellow juror Ann Redington on "Hard Ball With Chris Matthews". I felt as though I'd received my own pardon.... At the end of my bit, I told the interviewer I was quitting showbiz and passing the torch to Ann.... What I didn't know was that Jon Stewart would soon make fun of me on "The Daily Show."... Fair play. And that was something we did learn on Scooter Libby's jury."

== Personal life ==
He was a resident of Washington, D.C. and was married to Pam Riley. They had two children, Dylan and Riley Collins.

== Books by Collins ==
- Nora's Army. Washington, D.C.: Washington Writers Publishing House. 2006. ISBN 0-931846-83-8. (10). ISBN 978-0-931846-83-0 (13).
- Spying: The Secret History of History. New York: Black Dog & Leventhal Publishers. 2004. ISBN 1-57912-395-3. (10). ISBN 978-1-57912-395-6 (13).

== See also ==
- Lewis Libby
- Plame affair
- United States v. Libby
