= Fair Game (memoir) =

2007 memoir by Valerie Plame Wilson

Fair Game: My Life as a Spy, My Betrayal by the White House
- Author: Valerie Plame Wilson
- Language: English
- Genre: Memoir
- Publisher: Simon & Schuster
- Publication date: October 22, 2007
- Publication place: United States
- Media type: Print (hardcover), CD, e-audio
- Pages: 320
- ISBN: 978-1-4165-3761-8
- OCLC: 180205046
- Dewey Decimal: 327.12730092 B 22
- LC Class: JK468.I6 W465 2007

Fair Game: My Life as a Spy, My Betrayal by the White House (New York: Simon & Schuster, 2007) is a memoir by Valerie Plame Wilson. Wilson is the former covert CIA officer whose then-classified non-official cover (NOC) identity as "Valerie Plame" was leaked to the press in July 2003, after her husband, former Ambassador Joseph C. Wilson, IV, had criticized the George W. Bush administration's rationale for the Iraq War. The outing made her the center of the American political scandal known as the Plame affair. Her public outing led to her decision to resign from the CIA in December 2005, when she attempted to retire early at the age of 42. Being told that she could not collect her pension until the age of 56, she determined to write this book both as a means of telling her own story in her own words and as a means of earning income to replace her deferred retirement annuity. She encountered resistance from the CIA in the course of chronicling her work with the organization.

As Janet Maslin writes in her review in The New York Times on the day of publication, "the story of how her career was derailed and her C.I.A. cover blown ... has its combative side. But the real proof of Ms. Wilson's fighting spirit is the form in which her version of events has been brought into the light of day."

== Title ==
=== Contexts of allusions in title ===
==== "Wilson's wife is fair game" ====
The phrase "fair game" in the title of Wilson's memoir refers to a comment that President George W. Bush's Deputy White House Chief of Staff for Strategic Planning and Senior Advisor Karl Rove reportedly told Chris Matthews, the host of MSNBC's television show Hardball with Chris Matthews: "I just got off the phone with Karl Rove. He says, and I quote, 'Wilson's wife is fair game.'" "Fair Game" serves as a metaphor derived from more recent contexts of her life that the author relates in this book; given the nature of covert espionage, it may suggest multiple meanings.

===== Karl Rove's disavowal of the phrase "fair game" =====
After the title of Valerie Plame Wilson's book had already been widely disseminated, on August 19, 2007, on Meet the Press with David Gregory, Gregory asked Rove, who identified himself as an "avid Republican", among other statements pertaining to the CIA leak grand jury investigation attributed to him, whether he "considered her fair game in this debate" between her husband and The White House over the President's so-called "sixteen words". Rove responded that the phrase "fair game" attributed to him by Chris Matthews was Matthews' phrase not his own and that he himself did not consider Wilson (in Gregory's phrase) "an appropriate target in this debate."

===== Related contexts =====
In October 2003 Evan Thomas and Michael Isikoff reported in Newsweek that "The White House spokesman dismissed as 'ridiculous' the charge that Rove outed Plame." As Thomas and Isikoff note, "It may be significant that both Rove and Libby deny leaking classified information. They may say that in talking to reporters they used her name without knowing that she was undercover."

Chris Matthews reportedly declined to discuss the telephone conversation that he had had with Rove, according to Thomas and Iskikoff in Newsweek, who quote the conversation that Wilson reported having with Matthews and then add parenthetically: "(Matthews told Newsweek: 'I'm not going to talk about off-the-record conversations.')" David Corn of The Nation notes Matthews' statement to Newsweek "that he would not discuss off-the record conversations", adding, also parenthetically, that, earlier, "he [Matthews] told me the same."

Matthews was one of over twenty-five journalists subpoenaed by Special Counsel Patrick Fitzgerald regarding their conversations with high-level Bush administration officials pertaining to the CIA leak grand jury investigation (2003–2005), leading to the indictment and prosecution, conviction, and sentencing of Scooter Libby in United States v. Libby (2007).

Ultimately, whereas Fitzgerald's grand jury did not indict Rove for committing any alleged crimes, and, in October 2005, it did indict Libby not for allegedly having leaked Wilson's identity but for allegedly having lied in his sworn testimony pertaining to the leak investigation, federal felonies for which a jury convicted and a judge sentenced him, a sentence which was commuted by Presidential proclamation. On July 19, 2007, a district court judge dismissed the Wilsons' civil lawsuit (Plame v. Cheney) which charged related offenses by the various government officials. The dismissal was on jurisdictional grounds, that the case belonged in federal court. The Wilsons appealed that decision, but on August 12, 2008, a three-judge panel of the United States Court of Appeals for the District of Columbia Circuit upheld the dismissal in a 2–1 decision. On June 21, 2009, the U.S. Supreme Court refused to hear the appeal.

On April 6, 2006, Matthews stated his own point of view on the CIA leak publicly in some detail in his conversation with Senator John Kerry on Hardball with Chris Matthews, describing as "high drama" Scooter Libby's testimony that the President of the United States via the Vice President of the United States had "ordered" Libby to leak classified information pertaining to national security in order to bolster the case for the Iraq War after it began in March 2003.

On June 7, 2007, the day after Lewis Libby's sentencing, in a conversation with actor and political activist Ben Affleck about other matters, Chris Matthews used the phrase "fair game" several times, initially citing its use in a question submitted for Affleck by a viewer, whose own use of the phrase could reflect Matthews' already well-publicized reported use of it by Wilson, Newsweek, and many other media sources. His later usage of the phrase "fair game" in talking with Affleck about other matters raises a possibility that the phrase "fair use" that he reportedly used in talking with Wilson about Rove's comments about "Wilson's wife" (as quoted in The Politics of Truth [2004, 2005] and as previously quoted in Newsweek [2003]) was his own phrase and not Rove's, as Rove later disavowed it.

Nevertheless, whether or not Rove originated it, the phrase still conveys metaphorically what Matthews and the Wilsons appear to think that Rove literally may have intended: to "target" (in Gregory's later terminology) Wilson and, collaterally, to leak the information about his wife's CIA identity in the process. The CIA leak grand jury investigation did not result in charging that anyone leaked her name intentionally while knowing that it was a classified covert identity, in part, Special Counsel Fitzgerald later argued in United States v. Libby, because of Libby's obstruction of justice. The jury convicted Libby on four of the five counts in the indictment: one count of obstruction of justice; two counts of perjury; and one count of making false statements to federal investigators, he was sentenced on June 5, 2007, and President Bush commuted his 30-month prison sentence on July 2, 2007.

On July 3, 2007, the day after President Bush commuted Libby's sentence, Chris Matthews talked again with former Ambassador Wilson, who reiterated his belief that the Bush administration had inappropriately leaked his wife's then-classified covert CIA identity to retaliate against him politically, in effect targeting her. Matthews asked Wilson: "When did you sense that the White House was trying to destroy your reputation?" and he replied: "Well, it was pretty clear to me shortly after I wrote my article "What I Didn't Find in Africa", when Mr. Novak spoke to a friend of mine on the street and said that, Wilson's a 'blank,' and his wife works for the CIA, that the nature of the smear campaign they were going to run against me was going to include the betrayal of her identity as a covert CIA officer. And that would have been around July 8 or July 9 [2003]."

==== Subtitle ====
The subtitle "My Life as a Spy, My Betrayal by the White House" corresponds to parts of the subtitle of the 2005 paperback edition of former Ambassador Wilson's memoir Inside the Lies that Put the White House on Trial and Betrayed My Wife's CIA Identity: A Diplomat's Memoir. Since her identity was leaked by Richard Armitage, then Deputy Secretary of State, the subtitles are not entirely accurate.

== Review excerpts ==
Janet Maslin:

'Anyone not living in a cave for the last few years [since the outing in 2003] knew I had a career at the C.I.A.,' writes Ms. Wilson ... Once that career was destroyed, she wrote this account of her experiences as a means of both supporting herself and settling scores. She was contractually obligated to submit a draft of the book to the Central Intelligence Agency's Publications Review Board. That draft came back heavily expurgated. She was then expected to rewrite her book so that it made sense despite many deletions.

But Ms. Wilson and her publisher, Simon & Schuster, contend that much of the censored information is in the public domain—and that the suppression of information is itself part of Ms. Wilson's story. So Fair Game has been published with the censor's marks visible as blacked-out words, lines, paragraphs or pages. The publisher amplifies the book with an 80-page afterword by Laura Rozen, a reporter, who uses matters of public record to fill in some of the gaps.

'My days of spelling "P-L-A-M as in Mary-E" over the phone would be over,' she writes in what is this book's biggest understatement. But however widely known she has become, Ms. Wilson has not previously revealed what it was like for her to follow the trial of I. Lewis Libby Jr., known as Scooter; to be infuriated that Judith Miller, then of The New York Times, and Matthew Cooper of Time tried to protect secret sources at Ms. Wilson's expense ('These reporters were allowing themselves to be exploited by the administration and were obstructing the investigation'); and to learn that Ms. Miller, in her notebook, had gotten her name wrong, calling her "Valerie Flame" ('my exotic-dancer stage name,' Ms. Wilson joked to friends). She was outraged by the extent to which she had become fodder for the gossip mill.

Citing the dismay voiced by Ari Fleischer, the White House press secretary, that such loose talk about an undercover agent might actually be criminal, she writes angrily: 'If he was so surprised that his actions might have adverse national security implications, then he's not smart enough to work in the White House. That goes for all the officials who thought that using my name as catnip was just playing the Washington game as usual.'

That idea of gamesmanship gives 'Fair Game,' the book's already stinging title, an even harsher meaning.

Alan Cooperman:

There is no reason to doubt that Wilson wrote Fair Game herself. To put it kindly, the memoir lacks the sheen of a ghostwriter's work and has the voice of an ordinary person caught up in extraordinary events. It doesn't help that the CIA redacted the manuscript heavily before approving it for publication. Each time she is about to launch into a juicy anecdote, it seems, lines are blacked out, sometimes for pages on end. The book is, however, greatly assisted by an afterword by Laura Rozen, a reporter for the American Prospect. Rozen faithfully echoes Wilson's point of view but fills in many of the censored dates, places and other details from published sources. Readers would be smart to turn to the afterword first, before tackling Wilson's disjointed narrative.

== Film adaptation ==
In 2010, the book was adapted into a film starring Naomi Watts as Plame with Sean Penn as her husband.
