= Joseph C. Wilson =

American diplomat (1949–2019)

Joe Wilson
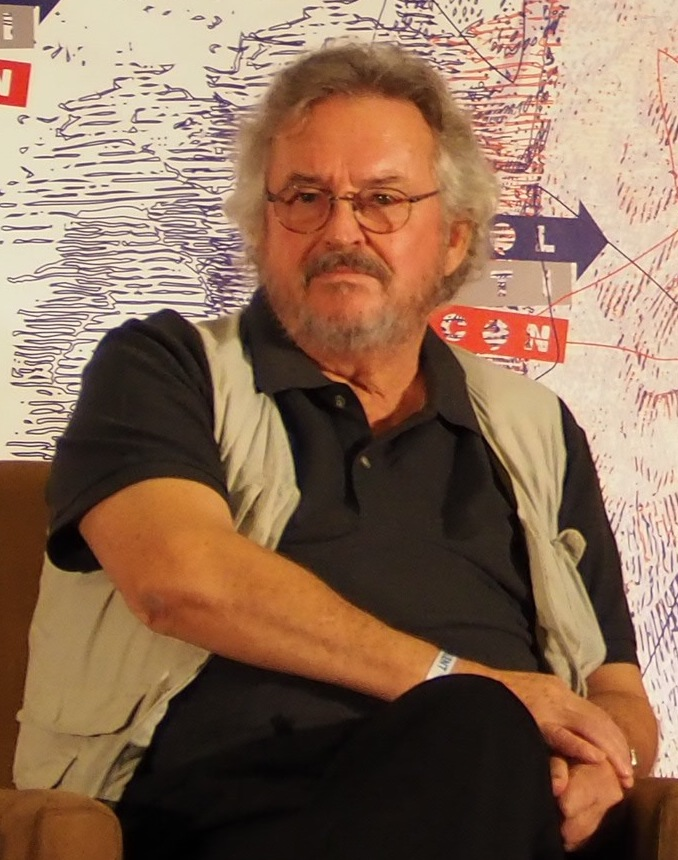
- Wilson at Politicon 2018

United States Ambassador to São Tomé and Príncipe
- In office September 29, 1992 – August 4, 1995
- President: George H. W. Bush; Bill Clinton
- Preceded by: Keith Wauchope
- Succeeded by: Elizabeth Raspolic

United States Ambassador to Gabon
- In office September 17, 1992 – August 5, 1995
- President: George H. W. Bush; Bill Clinton
- Preceded by: Keith Wauchope
- Succeeded by: Elizabeth Raspolic

United States Ambassador to Iraq
- Acting
- In office July 1990 – January 12, 1991
- President: George H. W. Bush
- Preceded by: April Glaspie
- Succeeded by: Jan Wojciech Piekarski (acting)

Personal details
- Born: Joseph Charles Wilson IV; November 6, 1949 Bridgeport, Connecticut, U.S.
- Died: September 27, 2019 (aged 69) Santa Fe, New Mexico, U.S.
- Party: Democratic
- Spouses: Susan Otchis (m. 1974; div. 1986); Jacqueline Wilson (m. 1986; div. 1998); Valerie Plame (m. 1998; div. 2017)
- Children: 4
- Education: University of California, Santa Barbara (BA)

Joseph Charles Wilson IV (November 6, 1949 – September 27, 2019) was an American diplomat who was best known for his 2002 trip to Niger to investigate allegations that Saddam Hussein was attempting to purchase yellowcake uranium; his New York Times op-ed piece, "What I Didn't Find in Africa"; and the subsequent leaking by the Bush/Cheney administration of information pertaining to the identity of his wife Valerie Plame as a CIA officer. He also served as the CEO of a consulting firm he founded, JC Wilson International Ventures, and as the vice chairman of Jarch Capital, LLC.

== Early life and education ==
Joseph Charles Wilson IV was born in Bridgeport, Connecticut, on November 6, 1949, to Joseph Charles Wilson III, and Phyllis (Finnell) Wilson; he grew up in California and Europe. He was raised in a "proud Republican family" in which "there [was] a long tradition of politics and service to the farm" and for which "[p]olitics was a staple around the table". Wilson's father Joe was a Marine pilot in World War II and narrowly escaped death by taking off immediately before the bombing of the aircraft carrier USS Franklin, in which 700 other American servicemen died.

In 1968, Wilson entered the University of California, Santa Barbara, majoring, he said, in "history, volleyball, and surfing" and maintaining a "C" average. He worked as a carpenter for five years after his 1972 graduation. Later, he received a graduate fellowship, studying public administration. Wilson was influenced by the Vietnam War protests of the late 1960s.

== Diplomatic career ==
Having become fluent in French as a teenager, Wilson entered the US Foreign Service in 1976, where he would be employed until 1998.

From January 1976 through 1998, he was posted in five African nations; as a general services officer in Niamey, Niger, (his first assignment) he was "responsible for keeping the power on and the cars running, among other duties". From 1988 to 1991, he was the Deputy Chief of Mission (to US Ambassador to Iraq April Glaspie) at the US Embassy in Baghdad, Iraq. In the wake of Saddam's invasion of Kuwait in 1990, he became the last American diplomat to meet with Iraqi President Saddam Hussein, sternly telling him in very clear terms to leave Kuwait. When Hussein sent a note to Wilson (along with other embassy heads in Baghdad) threatening to execute anyone sheltering foreigners in Iraq as a deterrent, Wilson publicly repudiated the President by appearing at a press conference wearing a homemade noose around his neck and declaring, "If the choice is to allow American citizens to be taken hostage or to be executed, I will bring my own fucking rope."

Despite Hussein's warnings, Wilson sheltered more than 100 Americans at the embassy and successfully evacuated several thousand people (Americans and other nationals) from Iraq. For his actions, he was called "a true American hero" by President George H. W. Bush. From 1992 to 1995, he served as US ambassador to Gabon and São Tomé and Príncipe.

From 1995 to 1997, Wilson served as Political Advisor (POLAD) to the Commander in Chief of US Armed Forces, Europe (EUCOM), in Stuttgart, Germany. From 1997 until 1998, when he retired, he helped direct Africa policy as Special Assistant to President Bill Clinton and as National Security Council Senior Director for African Affairs.

== Subsequent employment ==
After retiring from government service in 1998, Wilson managed JC Wilson International Ventures Corp., an international business development and management company. Early in 2007, Wilson became vice chairman of Jarch Capital, LLC., to advise the firm on expansion in areas of Africa considered "politically sensitive."

Wilson also served as a guest speaker and panelist in conferences and other programs devoted to African business policies and political affairs, as well as on the matters pertaining to the CIA leak scandal.

== Political involvement ==
At the midpoint of his career as a diplomat, Wilson served for a year (1985–1986) as a Congressional Fellow in the offices of Senator Al Gore and Representative Tom Foley; he would later attribute his working for the Democratic Party to "happenstance." That experience helped him gain his position as Special Assistant to President Bill Clinton and Senior Director for African Affairs, National Security Council, in 1997–1998.

Over the years, Wilson made contributions to the campaigns of Democratic candidates, such as Senator Ted Kennedy of Massachusetts and Congressman Charles B. Rangel of New York, and to Republican Congressman Ed Royce of California. In 2000, he donated funds both to Gore's and Bush's presidential campaigns.

In 2003, Wilson endorsed John Kerry for president and donated to his campaign; in 2003 and 2004, he served as an advisor to and speechwriter for the campaign (410–12). Wilson endorsed Hillary Clinton in the 2008 US presidential election. He made speeches on her behalf and attended fundraisers for the campaign. After the 2003 invasion of Iraq, Wilson supported activist groups like Win Without War, a nonpartisan coalition of groups united in opposition to the Iraq War After the invasion and the publication of his memoir, The Politics of Truth, he spoke frequently in the public media and at colleges and universities.

== Trip to Niger ==
In late February 2002, Wilson traveled to Niger at the CIA's request to investigate the possibility that Saddam Hussein had purchased enriched yellowcake uranium. Wilson met with the current US Ambassador to Niger, Barbro Owens-Kirkpatrick (1999–2002) at the embassy and then interviewed dozens of officials who had been in the Niger government at the time of the supposed deal. He ultimately concluded: "it was highly doubtful that any such transaction had ever taken place." (Note: See Wilson's "Timeline" entitled "Events surrounding the 'Sixteen Words' and the Disclosure of the Undercover Status of CIA Operative Valerie Plame, Wife of Ambassador Joseph Wilson": September 2002: First public mention of Niger-Iraq uranium connection is made in British White paper. January 28, 2003: The sixteen words are spoken by President Bush in his State of the Union address: "The British government has learned that Saddam Hussein recently sought significant quantities of uranium from Africa." March 7, 2003: International Atomic Energy Agency announces that documents provided by U.S. about Niger-Iraq uranium claim are forgeries. March 8, 2003: State Department spokesman says of forged documents: 'We fell for it'; shortly thereafter, Wilson tells CNN that the U.S. government has more information on this matter than the State Department spokesmen acknowledged. Sources have informed Wilson that soon after the CNN interview, a decision was made at a meeting in the Office of the Vice President—possibly attended by Dick Cheney, Lewis "Scooter" Libby, Newt Gingrich, and other senior Republicans—to produce a workup on Wilson to discredit him. June 8, 2003: On Meet the Press Condoleezza Rice denies knowledge of how dubious the uranium claim was and dissembles: "Maybe somebody down in the bowels of the Agency knew about this, but nobody in my circles." July 6, 2003: Wilson's op-ed, "What I Didn't Find in Africa", is published in The New York Times; Wilson appears on Meet the Press, describes his trip and why he came away convinced that no attempt by Iraq to purchase uranium from Niger had taken place. July 8, 2003: Columnist Robert Novak encounters Wilson's friend on Washington, D.C., street and blurts out Valerie Plame's CIA employment. July 14, 2003: Novak publishes column revealing Plame's status July 16, 2003: In The Nation David Corn publishes "A White House Smear", explaining that the Intelligence Identities Protection Act may have been violated by leak. July 20, 2003: NBC's Andrea Mitchell tells Wilson that "senior White House sources" had phoned her to stress "the real story here is not the sixteen words ... but Wilson and his wife." July 21, 2003: NBC's Chris Matthews tells Wilson: "I just got off the phone with Karl Rove. He says and I quote, 'Wilson's wife is fair game.' I will confirm that if asked." September 28, 2003: MSNBC announces that Justice Department has begun a criminal investigation into the leak. (Wilson, The Politics of Truth 452–54) Cf. CIA leak scandal timeline.)

Wilson learned that the Iraqis had in fact requested a meeting to discuss "expanding commercial relations" but that Niger's Prime Minister Mayaki had declined, due to concern about U.N. sanctions against Iraq. (Note: According to the United States Senate Select Committee on Intelligence Report on the US Intelligence Community's Prewar Intelligence Assessments on Iraq (2004), on the basis of his trip to Niger, In an interview with Committee staff, the former ambassador [Wilson] was able to provide more information about the meeting between former [Niger] Prime Minister Mayaki and the Iraqi delegation. ... [Wilson] said that Mayaki did meet with the Iraqi delegation but never discussed what was meant by [the two countries] "expanding commercial relations" [being suggested by the Iraqis]. ... [Wilson] said that because Mayaki was wary of discussing any trade issues with a country under United Nations (UN) sanctions, he made a successful effort to steer the conversation away from a discussion of trade with the Iraqi delegation." Report on the U.S. Intelligence Community's Prewar Intelligence Assessments on Iraq, Together with Additional Views |24.1 MiB, July 7, 2004, revised July 9, 2004, (Washington: Government Printing Office, 2004) pp. 36–83, accessed July 29, 2007.)

== "What I Didn't Find in Africa" ==
President Bush's 2003 State of the Union Address included these 16 words: "The British government has learned that Saddam Hussein recently sought significant quantities of uranium from Africa." In response, in the July 6, 2003, issue of The New York Times, Wilson contributed an op-ed entitled "What I Didn't Find in Africa," in which he states that on the basis of his "experience with the administration in the months leading up to the war" he has "little choice but to conclude that some of the intelligence related to Iraq's nuclear weapons program was twisted to exaggerate the Iraqi threat."

Wilson described the basis for his mission to Niger as follows: "The vice president's office asked a serious question [about the truth of allegations that Iraq was seeking to purchase uranium yellowcake from Niger]. I was asked to help formulate the answer".

In the last two paragraphs of his op-ed, Wilson related his perspective to the Bush administration's rationale for the Iraq War:

I was convinced before the war that the threat of weapons of mass destruction in the hands of Saddam Hussein required a vigorous and sustained international response to disarm him. Iraq possessed and had used chemical weapons; it had an active biological weapons program and quite possibly a nuclear research program—all of which were in violation of United Nations resolutions. Having encountered Mr. Hussein and his thugs in the run-up to the Persian Gulf war of 1991, I was only too aware of the dangers he posed. But were these dangers the same ones the administration told us about? We have to find out. America's foreign policy depends on the sanctity of its information. For this reason, questioning the selective use of intelligence to justify the war in Iraq is neither idle sniping nor "revisionist history", as Mr. Bush has suggested. The act of war is the last option of a democracy, taken when there is a grave threat to our national security. More than 200 American soldiers have lost their lives in Iraq already. We have a duty to ensure that their sacrifice came for the right reasons.

== Administration reactions to disclosure ==
At a press conference on Monday, July 7, 2003, the day after the publication of the op-ed, Colin Powell said: "There was sufficient evidence floating around at that time that such a statement was not totally outrageous or not to be believed or not to be appropriately used. It's that once we used the statement, and after further analysis, and looking at other estimates we had, and other information that was coming in, it turned out that the basis upon which that statement was made didn't hold up, and we said so, and we've acknowledged it, and we've moved on." He also said: "the case I put down on the 5th of February [2003], for an hour and 20 minutes, roughly, on terrorism, on weapons of mass destruction, and on the human rights case ... we stand behind"

In a July 11, 2003, statement, CIA director George Tenet, stated that the President, Vice President and other senior administration officials were not briefed on Wilson's report (otherwise widely distributed in the intelligence community) because it "did not resolve whether Iraq was or was not seeking uranium from abroad". In his 2007 memoir, Tenet wrote that Wilson's report "produced no solid answers" and "was never delivered to Cheney. In fact, I have no recollection myself of hearing about Wilson's trip at the time."

In the July 11 statement, Tenet also noted that, according to Wilson's report, a former Niger official interpreted an Iraqi approach as an "overture as an attempt to discuss uranium sales." Asked about this the following October, Wilson said that the official in question had declined the meeting, due to U.N. Security Council sanctions against Iraq, but speculated "maybe they might have wanted to talk about uranium". (Note: On Meet the Press with Tim Russert on October 5, 2003, Wilson said: "An intermediary came to this official, and said, 'I want you to meet with these guys. They're interested in talking about expanding commercial relations.' The person who talked to me said, 'Red flags went up immediately, I thought of U.N. Security Council sanctions, I thought of all sorts of other reasons why we didn't want to have any meeting. I declined the meeting', and this was out of the country, on the margins of an OIC meeting. So it was a meeting that did not take place. And at one point during the conversation, this official kind of looked up in the sky and plumbing his conscience, looked back and said, "You know, maybe they might have wanted to talk about uranium." "Transcript of October 5", Meet the Press, NBC News, October 6, 2003, accessed July 23, 2007. ("Guests: Joseph Wilson, Former Acting Ambassador to Iraq & CIA Envoy to Niger; Robert Novak, Syndicated Columnist; David Broder, Washington Post; Ron Brownstein, Los Angeles Times; Dana Priest, Washington Post Moderator: Tim Russert – NBC News").)

There was substantial disagreement about whether Wilson implied in the op-ed that he was sent to Niger at the request of the vice president, or his office. The implication that Cheney or his office sent Wilson to Niger, whether made by Wilson or the media, was apparently a cause of consternation to vice-presidential aide I. Lewis Libby, who called NBC's Tim Russert to complain. On July 6, 2003, in a Meet the Press interview with Andrea Mitchell, Wilson stated: "The question was asked of the CIA by the office of the vice president. The office of the vice president, I am absolutely convinced, received a very specific response to the question it asked and that response was based upon my trip out there."

== Disclosure of Valerie Plame's identity ==
The week after the publication of Wilson's New York Times op-ed, Robert Novak, in his syndicated Washington Post column, disclosed that Wilson's wife, Valerie Plame, worked for the CIA as an agency operative in an article entitled "Mission to Niger." Subsequently, former Ambassador Wilson and others alleged that the disclosure was part of the Bush administration's attempts to discredit his report about his investigations in Africa and the op-ed describing his findings because they did not support the government's rationale for the 2003 invasion of Iraq. Wilson's allegations led to a federal investigation of the leak by the United States Department of Justice, to the appointment of a Special Counsel Patrick Fitzgerald, and to the Plame affair grand jury investigation.

In 2005, retired US Army Major General Paul E. Vallely claimed that former Ambassador Wilson "mentioned Plame's status as a CIA employee" in 2002 [one year before she was allegedly "outed"] in the Fox News Channel's "green room" in Washington, D.C., as they waited to appear on air as analysts.

Although no one was "indicted for actually leaking Plame's identity," the investigation resulted in the federal criminal trial United States v. Libby in which Lewis Libby, the former Chief of Staff to Vice President of the United States, Dick Cheney, was tried on five federal felony counts. He was convicted on four of the counts, involving false statements, perjury, and obstruction of justice, none of which related directly to the Plame revelation but rather to his failure to cooperate with the subsequent investigation into the revelation.

In 2007 Libby was sentenced to 30 months in prison and a fine of $250,000. The prison sentence was commuted by President Bush a month later, who let the conviction and fine stand. In 2018 a full pardon was granted by President Trump.

== The Politics of Truth ==
In 2004, Wilson published a political and personal memoir entitled The Politics of Truth: Inside the Lies that Led to War and Betrayed My Wife's CIA Identity: A Diplomat's Memoir. The book describes his diplomatic career, his personal life and family, and his experiences during the Valerie Plame affair. Wilson's autobiographical account of over two decades of his life in foreign service includes detailed descriptions of his extensive diplomatic-career experiences, his first marriage and family, briefer references to his second marriage, his meeting of Valerie Plame, their courtship and marriage, and a detailed narrative of the events leading to his decision to go public with his criticisms of the George W. Bush administration and its aftermath.

== Commentaries ==
An editorial in The Wall Street Journal published in mid-July 2004, finds some justification for his perspective presented in "What I Didn't Find in Africa", but highlights some evidence of Iraq's attempts at acquiring uranium yellowcake from African nations such as Niger, on which Iraq did not follow through.

But another editorial published July 13, 2005, in The Wall Street Journal asserts that Wilson had lied in his "What I Didn't Find in Africa" about "what he'd discovered in Africa, how he'd discovered it, what he'd told the CIA about it, or even why he was sent on the mission."

An editorial headlined "A Good Leak" published April 9, 2006, in The Washington Post claims that "Mr. Wilson was the one guilty of twisting the truth and that, in fact, his report [to the CIA] supported the conclusion that Iraq had sought uranium."

Some commentators and newspaper readers believed that this Washington Post editorial contradicted a news article in the paper's same issue, which reported that the administration had misrepresented its actual confidence level in the intelligence reports that Hussein was seeking uranium. (Note: "At Cheney's instruction, Libby testified, he [Libby] told [reporter] Miller that the uranium story was a 'key judgment' of the intelligence estimate, a term of art indicating there was consensus on a question of central importance. In fact, the alleged effort to buy uranium was not among the estimate's key judgments, which were identified by a headline and bold type and set out in bullet form in the first five pages of the 96-page document ... US intelligence 'did not know' the status of Iraq's procurement efforts, 'cannot confirm' any success and had 'inconclusive' evidence about Iraq's domestic uranium operations. ... The State Department's Bureau of Intelligence and Research, likewise, called the claim 'highly dubious.' For those reasons, the uranium story was relegated to a brief inside passage in the October estimate.")

Complaints to The Washington Post ombudsman Deborah Howell about the apparent contradiction between the article and editorial, resulted in her acknowledging "the high wall between editorial and news" and also that "it would have been helpful if the editorial had put statements about Wilson in more context". (Note: Replying to complaints from various readers, The Washington Post ombudsman, Deborah Howell, notes that in their front-page news report Barton Gellman and Dafna Linzer relied on Fitzgerald's representations in his legal filings, that the editorial's writer wrote it before the front-page report, and that although the writer had not read the report, it would not have changed his mind. Howell notes that the basis for the editorial's claim that Wilson's report "supported the conclusion that Iraq had sought uranium" was that there was a meeting between Iraqi and Nigerien trade officials "because that's mostly what Niger has to export." She observes that the editorial inconsistently deals with the 2004 report of the Senate Select Committee on Intelligence, which notes that "the State Department's Bureau of Intelligence and Research analysts believed that [Wilson's] report supported their assessment that Niger was unlikely to be willing or able to sell uranium to Iraq." Howell concludes: It would have been helpful if the editorial had put statements about Wilson in more context—especially the controversy over his trip and what he said. It also could have used a sentence to say what is known in every newsroom: Leaks are good for journalism. On the Gellman/Linzer story, it would have been good to quote more from the WMD commission's and Iraq Survey Group's reports and specifically their conclusions. Both pieces demonstrate the high wall between editorial and news. While editorial writers read reporters' stories, Executive Editor Len Downie doesn't regularly read editorials (although he read this one) lest it make a mark on how he runs the news pages. Some readers think it's a scandal when two parts of the newspaper appear to be in conflict with each other, but it's not that unusual that reporting—particularly in news and editorial—will depend on different sources. It happened again last week when an editorial and a story gave different estimates for how long it might take Iran to build a nuclear bomb. Reporting about national security and intelligence gathering is always fraught with fraught [sic]; it is a subject I will write about again. Deborah Howell, "Two Views of the Libby Leak Case", The Washington Post, April 16, 2006: B06, accessed September 19, 2006.)

== Richard Armitage ==
In their 2006 book Hubris, Michael Isikoff and David Corn assert that it was Richard Armitage, Deputy Secretary of State, who first revealed that Wilson's wife worked for the CIA to Robert Novak sometime before July 8, 2003. In late August 2006, along with advance publicity for the book, news accounts and editorials began focusing on that public revelation: "Richard L. Armitage, a former deputy secretary of state, has acknowledged that he was the person whose conversation with a columnist in 2003 prompted a long, politically laden criminal investigation in what became known as the C.I.A. leak case, a lawyer involved in the case said on Tuesday [August 29, 2006]."

Wilson and his wife then amended their civil lawsuit (see below) to add Armitage as a defendant along with Vice President Dick Cheney and I. Lewis "Scooter" Libby. According to their complaint, Richard Armitage was being sued individually (independently of his White House colleagues) for having nevertheless also violated Plame's right to privacy and property (ability to make a living), while not reducing the culpability of the others as claimed.

In a column posted in TownHall.com on September 14, 2006, however, Novak disputes details of Armitage's contemporaneous media accounts of their conversations. According to Novak, "Armitage did not, as he now indicates, merely pass on something he had heard and that he 'thought' might be so. Rather, he identified to me the CIA division where Mrs. Wilson worked, and said flatly that she recommended the mission to Niger by her husband, former Amb. Joseph Wilson. Second, Armitage did not slip me this information as idle chitchat, as he now suggests. He made clear he considered it especially suited for my column." He noted that critics would not be able to "fit Armitage into the left-wing fantasy of a well-crafted White House conspiracy to destroy Joe and Valerie Wilson. The news that he and not Karl Rove was the leaker was devastating news for the Left."

In the American Journalism Review, editor Rem Rieder noted that the disclosure that Armitage was Novak's "primary source" was insufficiently covered in the media.

== Reactions to the Libby trial and commutation ==
In response to the verdict on March 6, 2007, finding Lewis Libby guilty of four of the five charges in the Fitzgerald grand jury indictment against him, the Wilsons issued a statement in a press release posted on the website of Citizens for Responsibility and Ethics in Washington. They stated that they respected the jury's verdict and believed justice was done, as well as affirming their commitment to pursuing their civil suit.

Wilson criticized President George W. Bush's July 2, 2007, commutation of Lewis Libby's prison sentence, calling it "a cover-up of the Vice President's role in this matter and quite possibly the role of the President and/or some of his senior White House advisers." (Note: For Wilson's full published statement in response to the commutation and the press conference about it by President Bush's press spokesman Tony Snow, see Joseph C. Wilson, "Ambassador Joseph C. Wilson's Response to Bush Spokesman Tony Snow's Comments at Today's White House Briefing", online posting, Citizens for Responsibility and Ethics in Washington (CREW), July 3, 2007, accessed July 4, 2007; online posting, "Ambassador Joseph C. Wilson's Response … " and "Read more", Joseph and Valerie Wilson Legal Support Trust (Home page), n.d., accessed July 8, 2007.) Wilson also complained that the President's action and others' actions leading to President Bush's commutation of Libby's sentence could seriously damage United States national security by harming its intelligence capability.

== Warner Bros. feature film ==
On the evening of the verdict in the Libby trial, Joseph C. Wilson appeared on Larry King Live, during which he announced that he and his wife had "signed a deal with Warner Bros of Hollywood to offer their consulting services—or maybe more—in the making of the forthcoming movie about the Libby trial", their lives and the CIA leak scandal. According to an article by Michael Fleming published in Variety earlier in the week, the feature film, a co-production between Weed Road's Akiva Goldsman and Jerry and Janet Zucker of Zucker Productions, with a screenplay by Jez and John Butterworth, is based in part on Valerie Wilson's then-forthcoming book "Fair Game", whose publication, in October 2007, after a delay of two months, was contingent on CIA clearances.

The film, Fair Game, was released November 5, 2010, starring Naomi Watts and Sean Penn. It is based on two books, one written by Wilson, and the other by his wife.

== Civil suit ==
On July 13, 2006, Joseph and Valerie Wilson filed a civil suit against Vice President Dick Cheney, his former Chief of Staff I. Lewis "Scooter" Libby, top Presidential advisor Karl Rove, and other unnamed senior White House officials (among whom they later added Richard Armitage), for their alleged role in the public disclosure of Valerie Wilson's classified CIA status. On September 13, 2006, Joseph and Valerie Wilson amended their original lawsuit, adding Richard Armitage as a fourth defendant. Unlike their charges against Rove, Cheney, and Libby, "claiming that they had violated her constitutional rights and discredited her by disclosing that she was an undercover CIA operative", the Wilsons sued Armitage "for violating the 'Wilsons' constitutional right to privacy, Mrs. Wilson's constitutional right to property, and for committing the tort of publication of private facts.'"

=== Dismissal ===
United States District Court for the District of Columbia Judge John D. Bates dismissed the Wilsons' lawsuit on jurisdictional grounds on July 19, 2007, stating that the Wilsons had not shown that the case belonged in federal court. Bates also ruled that the court lacked jurisdiction over the claim because the couple had not yet exhausted their administrative remedies. Bates stated that the lawsuit raised "important questions relating to the propriety of actions undertaken by our highest government officials" but also noted that "there can be no serious dispute that the act of rebutting public criticism, such as that levied by Mr. Wilson against the Bush administration's handling of prewar foreign intelligence, by speaking with members of the press is within the scope of defendants' duties as high-level Executive Branch officials", even if "the alleged means by which defendants chose to rebut Mr. Wilson's comments and attack his credibility" were perhaps "highly unsavory."

=== Appeal ===
On July 20, 2007, Ms. Sloan and the Wilsons announced publicly that they had filed an appeal of the US District Court's decision to dismiss their lawsuit. On August 12, 2008, in a 2–1 decision, the three-judge panel of the United States Court of Appeals for the District of Columbia Circuit upheld the dismissal. Melanie Sloan, of Citizens for Responsibility and Ethics in Washington, which represents the Wilsons, "said the group will request the full D.C. Circuit to review the case and appeal to the US Supreme Court." Agreeing with the Bush administration, the Obama Justice Department argues the Wilsons have no legitimate grounds to sue. On the current justice department position, Sloan stated: "We are deeply disappointed that the Obama administration has failed to recognize the grievous harm top Bush White House officials inflicted on Joe and Valerie Wilson. The government's position cannot be reconciled with President Obama's oft-stated commitment to once again make government officials accountable for their actions."

On June 21, 2009, the U.S. Supreme Court refused to hear the appeal.

== Personal life and death ==
Wilson's first marriage was to college friend Susan Otchis in 1974. In 1979, the couple had a set of twins, Sabrina Cecile and Joseph Charles V. The marriage ended in divorce in 1986, toward the end of his service in Burundi. Wilson married his second wife Jacqueline, a French diplomat raised in Africa, in 1986. Though Wilson and Jacqueline began to live separate lives in the 1990s, they did not divorce until 1998. Wilson had met Valerie Plame in 1997, while working for President Bill Clinton; they married in 1998, after Wilson's divorce from Jacqueline. They had two children, twins Trevor Rolph and Samantha Finnell Diana, born in 2000; the family moved to Santa Fe, New Mexico, in 2006. Wilson and Plame divorced in 2017.

Wilson died at his home in Santa Fe, on September 27, 2019, as a result of organ failure.

== Honors ==
Public service awards

- Secretary of State Distinguished Service Award
- Department of State Superior Honor Award
- Department of State Meritorious Honor Award
- University of California, Santa Barbara Distinguished Alumnus Award
- American Foreign Service Association William R. Rivkin Award (1987)

Decorations

- Commander in the Order of the Equatorial Star (Government of Gabon)
- Admiral in the El Paso Navy (El Paso County Commissioners)

Other awards

- BuzzFlash Wings of Justice Award, shared with wife, Valerie Plame (2005).
- Ron Ridenhour Award for Truth-Telling (from the Fertel Foundation and The Nation Institute, Oct. 2003)

== See also ==
- Downing Street memo
- Iraqi aluminum tubes
- Niger uranium forgeries

== Notes ==
Diplomatic posts
Preceded by April Glaspie	United States Ambassador to Iraq; Acting; 1990–1991	Succeeded by Jan Wojciech Piekarski; Acting
Preceded by Keith Wauchope	United States Ambassador to Gabon; 1992–1995	Succeeded by Elizabeth Raspolic
Preceded by Keith Wauchope	United States Ambassador to Sao Tome and Principe; 1992–1995	Succeeded by Elizabeth Raspolic
