= Elizabeth Raspolic =

American diplomat (1939–2022)

Elizabeth Raspolic (February 23, 1939 – May 26, 2022) was an American diplomat who served as the U.S. Ambassador to Gabon with a concurrent appointment to São Tomé and Principe (1995–1998). Raspolic was also director of the Interagency Rightsizing Committee.

Raspolic also served as Vice consul; Lyon, France (1974–1976) and Seoul, South Korea (1976–1978); Consul, Addis Ababa, Ethiopia (1978–1980) and Guangzhou, China (PRC) (1983–1986); and Consul general, Beijing (1986–1988).

Raspolic was one of approximately 90 intelligence officials who signed on to an open letter to the Wall Street Journal supporting the whistleblower in the Trump impeachment scandal.

Raspolic died after a brief illness on May 26, 2022 at the age of 83.

Diplomatic posts
Preceded by Joseph C. Wilson	United States Ambassador to Gabon; 1995–1998	Succeeded by James V. Ledesma
Preceded by Joseph C. Wilson	United States Ambassador to Sao Tome and Principe; 1995–1998	Succeeded by James V. Ledesma
