= Fair Game (soundtrack) =

Fair Game (Original Motion Picture Score)

Film score by John Powell
- Released: October 5, 2010
- Recorded: 2010
- Studio: Abbey Road Studios, London; 5 Cat Studios, Los Angeles
- Genre: Film score
- Length: 40:11
- Label: Lakeshore
- Producer: John Powell

John Powell chronology
| Knight and Day (2010) | Fair Game (2010) | Mars Needs Moms (2011) |

Fair Game (Original Motion Picture Score) is the film score to the 2010 film Fair Game directed by Doug Liman starring Naomi Watts and Sean Penn. The film score is composed by John Powell and released through Lakeshore Records on October 5, 2010.

== Development ==
The original score is composed by John Powell whom he had associated with Liman on The Bourne Identity (2002), Mr. & Mrs. Smith (2005) and Jumper (2008). The score was recorded at the Abbey Road Studios in London and released through Lakeshore Records on October 5, 2010.

== Reception ==
Christian Clemmensen of Filmtracks wrote "Unlike Scooter Libby, Powell can be whole-heartedly pardoned for giving us that uneasy feeling." William Ruhlmann of AllMusic wrote "This is a score full of disturbingly dark and low-pitched sounds, no doubt supporting the mystery and suspense of the story." Kirk Honeycutt of The Hollywood Reporter called it a "pulsating score". A. O. Scott of The New York Times found it to be "adrenaline-pumping". Chris Bumbray of JoBlo.com noted that Powell's score was reminiscent of his work from the Bourne trilogy. Justin Chang of Variety wrote "John Powell's music supports the action with an admirable lack of bombast."

== Track listing ==
| No. | Title | Length |
|---|---|---|
| 1. | "Kuala Lumpur" | 01:40 |
| 2. | "The White House" | 02:22 |
| 3. | "Gathering Intel" | 03:04 |
| 4. | "Joe's Report" | 03:57 |
| 5. | "Bruises" | 01:37 |
| 6. | "Smaky" | 01:00 |
| 7. | "Sixteen Words" | 02:59 |
| 8. | "Run Up to War" | 02:55 |
| 9. | "Change the Story" | 03:08 |
| 10. | "Uncomfortable Love" | 06:04 |
| 11. | "Breaking Point" | 03:58 |
| 12. | "Ready to Fight" | 02:55 |
| 13. | "Testify" | 04:32 |
| Total length: | | 40:11 |

== Personnel credits ==
Credits adapted from liner notes:

- Music composer and producer – John Powell
- Musical arrangements – James McKee Smith, Michael Mollo, Paul Mounsey
- Music programming – Beth Caucci, James McKee Smith, Michael Mollo, Paul Mounsey
- Sound engineer – John Barrett, Stan Gabriel
- Recording – Nick Wollage, Marc Viner
- Mixing – Nick Wollage
- Mastering – Patricia Sullivan-Fourstar
- Supervising score editor – Tom Carlson
- Score editor – Annette Kudrak
- Music supervisor – Julianne Jordan
- Musical assistance – Jacob Merryman, Jason Bard Waters, John Traunwieser
- Copyist – Jessica Wells, Jill Streater, Loclan Mackenzie-Spencer, Natalie Williams

Orchestra

- Supervising orchestrator – John Ashton Thomas
- Orchestrators – Gavin Greenaway, Germaine Franco, Tommy Laurence
- Conductor – Gavin Greenaway
- Orchestra contractor – Isobel Griffiths
- Assistant orchestra contractor – Lucy Whalley
- Orchestra leader – Perry Montague-Mason

Soloists

- Drums and percussions – Joey Waronker
- Guitar – Vivian Milanova
- Keyboards – Zac Rae

== Accolades ==
| Award | Category | Recipient(s) | Result |
|---|---|---|---|
| Guild of Music Supervisors Awards | Best Music Supervision for Film (Note: also for Alvin and the Chipmunks: The Squeakquel, Valentine's Day, RED, Cats & Dogs: The Revenge of Kitty Galore and The Bounty Hunter) | Julianne Jordan | Won |
| World Soundtrack Awards | Soundtrack Composer of the Year (Note: also for Mars Needs Moms, Rio and Kung Fu Panda 2) | John Powell | Nominated |
