= Keith Leveret Wauchope =

American Career Foreign Service Officer

Keith Leveret Wauchope (October 13, 1941 Manhattan - October 11, 2021) was an American Career Foreign Service Officer who served concurrent appointments as the Ambassador Extraordinary and Plenipotentiary to Gabon and São Tomé and Príncipe (1989–1992).

He grew up on the South Shore (Long Island), Sheepshead Bay, Brooklyn and Lloyd Harbor, New York. After initially attending local public schools, he went to Staunton Military Academy before transferring to the Boston Latin School and from there, Johns Hopkins University (Class of 1963). He started out as an engineering major but ended up concentrating in history.
