= The Politics of Truth =

2004 book by Joseph C. Wilson

- Author: Joseph C. Wilson
- Original title: The Politics of Truth: Inside the Lies that Led to War and Betrayed My Wife's CIA Identity: A Diplomat's Memoir
- Cover artist: Linda Kosarin
- Language: English
- Genre: Memoir
- Publisher: Carroll & Graf
- Publication date: April 30, 2004 (Hardcover); April 10, 2005 (Paperback)
- Publication place: United States
- Media type: Print (Hardcover; Paperback)
- Pages: 528; 517 + xlix
- ISBN: 978-0-7867-1378-3 [hardcover] ISBN 978-0-7867-1551-0 [paperback]
- OCLC: 54966142
- Dewey Decimal: 327.73/0092 B 22
- LC Class: JK468.E7 W55 2004

The Politics of Truth: Inside the Lies that Led to War and Betrayed My Wife's CIA Identity: A Diplomat's Memoir is a book by Joseph C. Wilson, first published by Carroll & Graf in a hardcover edition in 2004. A paperback edition was issued the following year. The book became a New York Times bestseller, and generated significant controversy in the media for its allegations regarding the George W. Bush administration and the 2003 invasion of Iraq.

Both a political and personal memoir, Wilson's autobiographical account of over two decades of his life in foreign service includes detailed descriptions of his extensive diplomatic experiences, including his career, his first two marriages, and his courtship and marriage to Valerie Plame, his third wife. Primarily, however, the book is a detailed narrative of the events leading to his decision to go public with his criticisms of the George W. Bush administration's decision to invade Iraq. The book is extended in appendices of chronological "timelines" and "Newspaper Commentaries Published by Ambassador Joseph Wilson Before and After the United States Invasion of Iraq in 2003" (461-486). It also includes a Bibliography (487-496) and a detailed index (497-517).

The 2005 paperback edition, subtitled Inside the Lies that Put the White House on Trial and Betrayed My Wife's CIA Identity, is "Updated with a New Preface by the Author ("Anatomy of a Smear" [li-lxix]) and an Investigative Report on the Niger Documents Affair by Russ Hoyle" ("The Niger Affair: The Investigation That Won't Go Away" [xiii-xlix]).

== Film adaptation ==
Fair Game is a 2010 biographical spy drama film directed by Doug Liman and starring Naomi Watts and Sean Penn. It is based on both this book and Valerie Plame's memoir, Fair Game: My Life as a Spy, My Betrayal by the White House. Released in 2010, it was one of the official selections competing for the Palme d'Or at the 2010 Cannes Film Festival. The film won the "Freedom of Expression Award" from the U.S. National Board of Review.
