= Matthew Cooper (American journalist) =

American political journalist (born 1963)

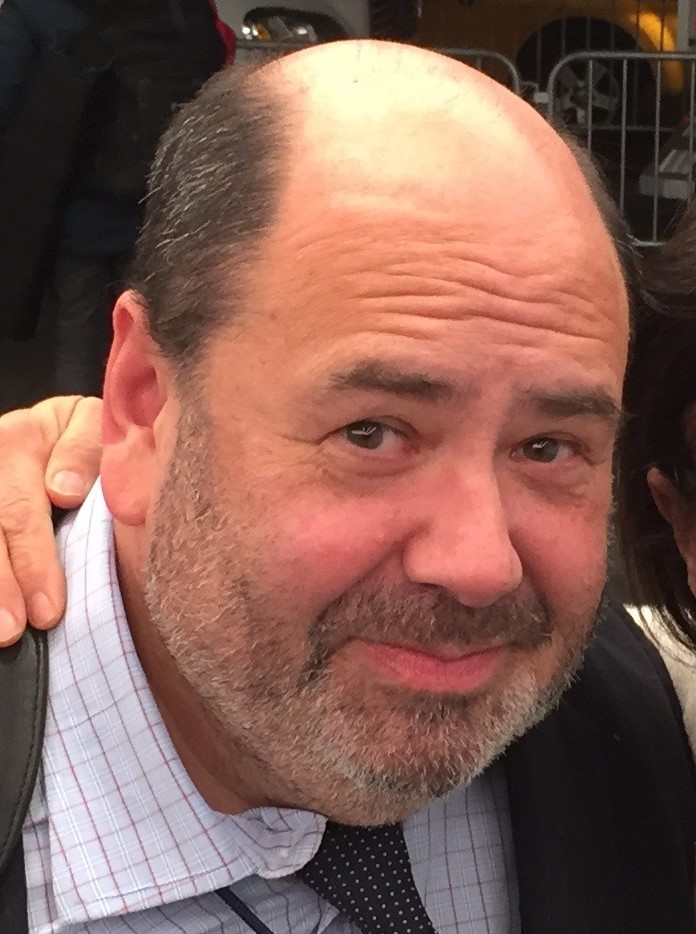
- Cooper in 2016.
- Born: 1963 (age 62–63)
- Education: Columbia University
- Occupation: Political journalist

Matthew Cooper (born 1963) is a political journalist with a career spanning more than 30 years, currently serving as the Executive Editor of Digital at the Washington Monthly. From 2014 to 2018, he was a senior writer and an editor at Newsweek. Before that, he was the managing editor for White House coverage at National Journal magazine and editor of National Journal Daily. Cooper is a former reporter for Time who, along with New York Times reporter Judith Miller was held in contempt of court and threatened with imprisonment for refusing to testify before the Grand Jury regarding the Valerie Plame CIA leak investigation. He was a blogger for Talking Points Memo in early 2009, and contributed to the magazine Condé Nast Portfolio until it closed in April 2009, after which he became a correspondent for The Atlantic magazine. He worked for the Financial Crisis Inquiry Commission on a book about the group's findings from the economic collapse in 2010.

In 2018, Cooper resigned from his senior writer position at Newsweek after two top editors were fired for investigating their parent company's potential illegal dealings. In his resignation letter, Cooper cited the company's dwindling standards and “reckless leadership” following several scandals both editorial and organizational.

== Contempt of court ==
On June 29, 2005, U.S. Federal judge Thomas F. Hogan gave Miller and Cooper one week to comply with the Grand Jury order to testify or face the maximum penalty of 18 months in prison

The United States Supreme Court declined the reporters' appeal of the contempt of court finding.

On July 6, 2005, Cooper agreed to testify, thus avoiding being held in contempt of court and sent to jail. Cooper said, "I went to bed ready to accept the sanctions for not testifying," but told the judge that not long before his early afternoon appearance at court he had received "in somewhat dramatic fashion" an indication from his source freeing him from his commitment to keep his source's identity secret.

Cooper stated in court that he did not previously accept a general waiver to journalists signed by his source (whom he did not identify by name), because he had made a personal pledge of confidentiality to his source. The 'dramatic change' which allowed Cooper to testify was later revealed to be a phone conversation between lawyers for Cooper and his source confirming that the waiver signed two years earlier applied to conversations with Cooper. Citing a "person who has been officially briefed on the case," The New York Times identified Karl Rove as the individual in question. Rove's own lawyer later confirmed this information. According to one of Cooper's lawyers, Cooper had previously testified before the grand jury regarding conversations with Lewis "Scooter" Libby, Jr., chief of staff for Vice President Dick Cheney, after having received Libby's specific permission to testify. Rove's own lawyer later confirmed this information.

On July 25, 2005, Cooper wrote an account of his grand jury testimony for Time. The article, entitled "What I Told The Grand Jury", concludes:

So did Rove leak Plame's name to me, or tell me she was covert? No. Was it through my conversation with Rove that I learned for the first time that Wilson's wife worked at the CIA and may have been responsible for sending him? Yes. Did Rove say that she worked at the "agency" on "WMD"? Yes. When he said things would be declassified soon, was that itself impermissible? I don't know. Is any of this a crime? Beats me. At this point, I'm as curious as anyone else to see what Patrick Fitzgerald has.
. . . In that testimony, I recounted an on-the-record conversation with Libby that moved to background. On the record, he denied that Cheney knew about or played any role in the Wilson trip to Niger. On background, I asked Libby if he had heard anything about Wilson's wife sending her husband to Niger. Libby replied, 'Yeah, I've heard that too,' or words to that effect. Like Rove, Libby never used Valerie Plame's name or indicated that her status was covert, and he never told me that he had heard about Plame from other reporters, as some press accounts have indicated.

== Personal ==
Matthew Cooper attended Columbia High School in Maplewood, New Jersey, followed by Columbia University. He has been divorced since 2009 from Hillary Clinton's media consultant Mandy Grunwald, whom he married in 1997 and separated from in 2007. They have a son, Benjamin, born in 1998.
