= Globehunters: An Around the World in 80 Days Adventure =

2002 animated television film

- Based on: Around the World in Eighty Days by Jules Verne
- Directed by: John Eng
- Starring: Sid Caesar; Willem Dafoe; Chaka Khan; Carl Reiner
- Music by: Don Grady
- Country of origin: United States
- Original language: English

Production
- Executive producers: Albie Hecht; Fred Seibert; Sherry Gunther; Barbara Epstein
- Producer: Peggy Becker
- Editor: Karyn Finley Thompson
- Running time: 73 minutes
- Production companies: Frederator Studios; Nickelodeon Animation Studio; DIC Entertainment

Original release
- Network: Nickelodeon
- Release: December 15, 2002

Globehunters: An Around the World in 80 Days Adventure is a 2002 American animated television film produced by DIC Entertainment and Frederator Studios for Nickelodeon as part of the DIC Movie Toons series. It originally aired on December 15, 2002. It was released on home media by MGM Home Entertainment. Loosely based on Around the World in Eighty Days by Jules Verne, the plot follows a trio of genetic animals, a gorilla named Eddie, a cheetah named Sasha, and a parrot named Trevor, who decide to escape a laboratory and travel the world in hopes of finding a place known as Himalaya USA. Meanwhile, a hunter is tasked with catching the animals within a period of eighty days, before the tracking devices attached to the latter self-destruct.

Despite being marketed as a DIC Movie Toon, Viacom International (and later Paramount Skydance) retained the rights to the film.

== Cast ==
- Lee Cherry as Eddie, a western lowland gorilla
- Kenna Ramsey as Sasha, a cheetah
- Brian Beacock as Trevor, a parrot
- Sid Caesar as Jacob, an african elephant.
- Willem Dafoe as Jack Hunter
- Chaka Khan as Marla
- Carl Reiner as Maz, an owl
- Wally Wingert as Raj, a red kangaroo
- Dwight Schultz as Dr. Burke
- Quinton Flynn as Dr. Wilkins and Spume
- Pat Musick as a Leopard and the French Newswomen
- Greg Eagles as the Old Lion and a Tiger
- Frank Welker as a Security Guard and the Circus Baboon

== Production ==
The story and script were written by Tim Wade and Danny Hartigan. The music for the film's songs were written by Emmy Award-winning composer John Kavanaugh and lyrics by John Kavanaugh and Barbara Epstein, the film's executive producer. The animation was produced overseas by Rough Draft Studios.

== Release ==
The film was initially scheduled for a 2000 air date on Nickelodeon, alongside The Electric Piper: A Pied Piper Adventure. Globehunters was released on DVD and VHS in 2003 by MGM Home Entertainment, and re-released on DVD on September 2, 2008, by Gaiam.
