= Elizabeth Hardwick =

Elizabeth Hardwick may refer to:

- Bess of Hardwick (1527–1608), Elizabethan courtier
- Elizabeth Hardwick (writer) (1916–2007), American literary critic, novelist, and short story writer
