= Steven Greenhouse =

American labor and workplace journalist and writer

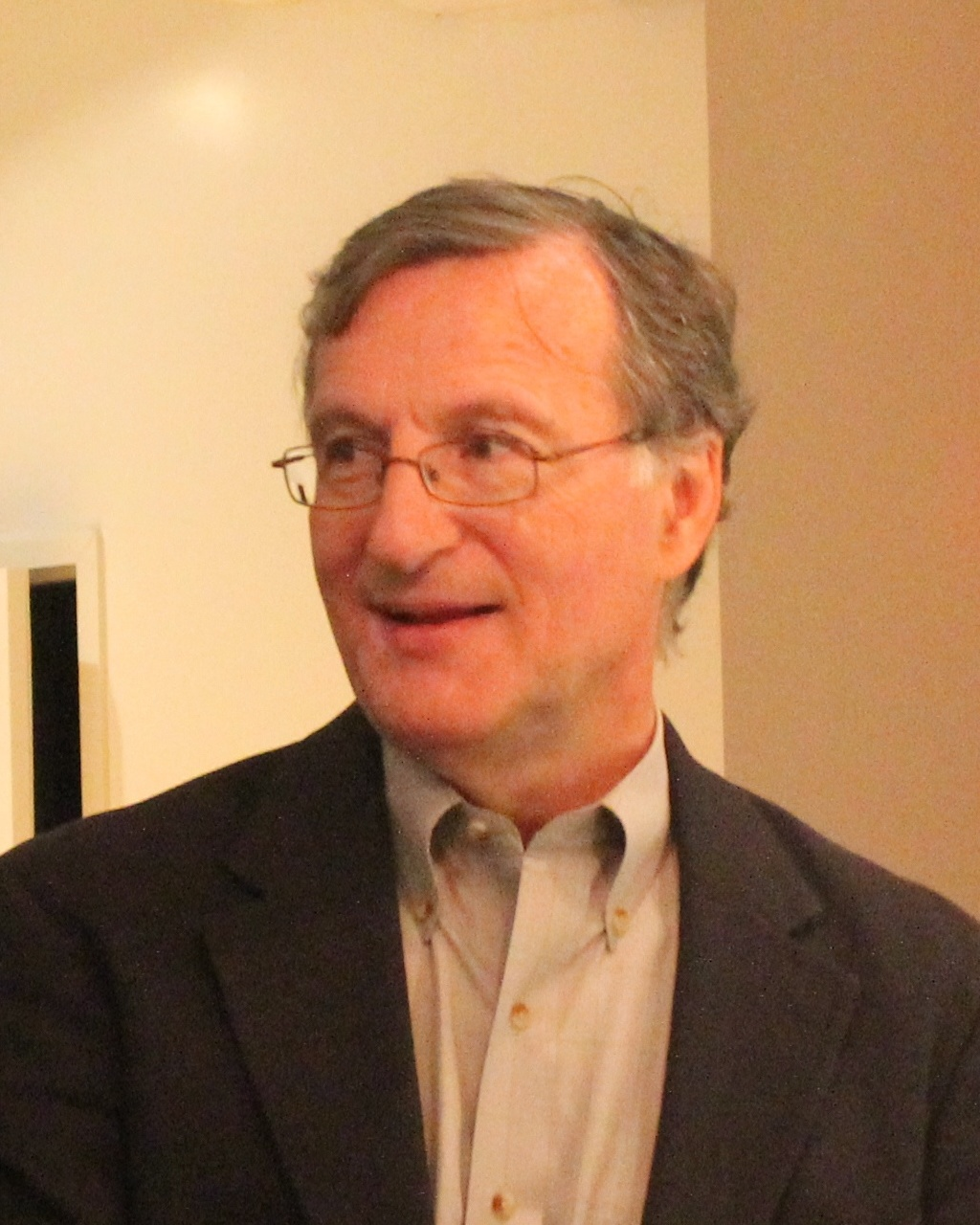
Greenhouse in 2015

Steven Greenhouse is an American labor and workplace journalist and writer. He covered labor for The New York Times from 1983 through 2014. On December 2, 2014, he announced on Twitter: "Thanks All. With great ambivalence, I'm taking NYT buyout. I plan to write a book & still write lots of articles on labor & other matters". He has contributed as an occasional op-ed writer to The New York Times since February 2015.

He graduated from Wesleyan University, the Columbia University Graduate School of Journalism, and the New York University School of Law. He lives in New York City. His daughter is Emily Greenhouse, the editor of The New York Review of Books.

== Awards ==
- 2010 Society of Professional Journalists Deadline Club Award: Beat reporting for newspapers and wire services, for "World of Hurt" with N.R. Kleinfield
- 2010 New York Press Club Award: Outstanding enterprise or investigative reporting, for "World of Hurt" with N.R. Kleinfield
- 2009 The Hillman Prize for The Big Squeeze: Tough Times for the American Worker
- 2014 Gerald Loeb Award for Breaking News for "Bangladesh"

== Works ==
- "Janesville, Wisconsin", Granta, January 2010
- "The End of Summer Vacation", Slate, June 11, 2008
- "The Unpaid Intern, Legal or Not", The New York Times, April 2, 2010
- The Big Squeeze: Tough Times for the American Worker, Random House, Inc., 2009, ISBN 978-1-4000-9652-7
- The rights of teachers: the basic ACLU guide to a teacher's constitutional rights, Bantam Books, 1984, ISBN 978-0-553-23655-2
- "Refusal to Fire Unattractive Saleswoman led to Dismissal, Suit Contends", Race, class, and gender in the United States: an integrated study, Macmillan, 2006, ISBN 978-0-7167-6148-8
- "Child Care the Perk of Tomorrow", A nation at work: the Heldrich guide to the American workforce, Editors Herbert A. Schaffner, Carl E. Van Horn, Rutgers University Press, 2003, ISBN 978-0-8135-3189-2
- Beaten Down, Worked Up: The Past, Present, and Future of American Labor Steven Greenhouse. Knopf, 2019 (416p) ISBN 978-1-101-87443-1
