= Judith Miller =

American journalist (born 1948)

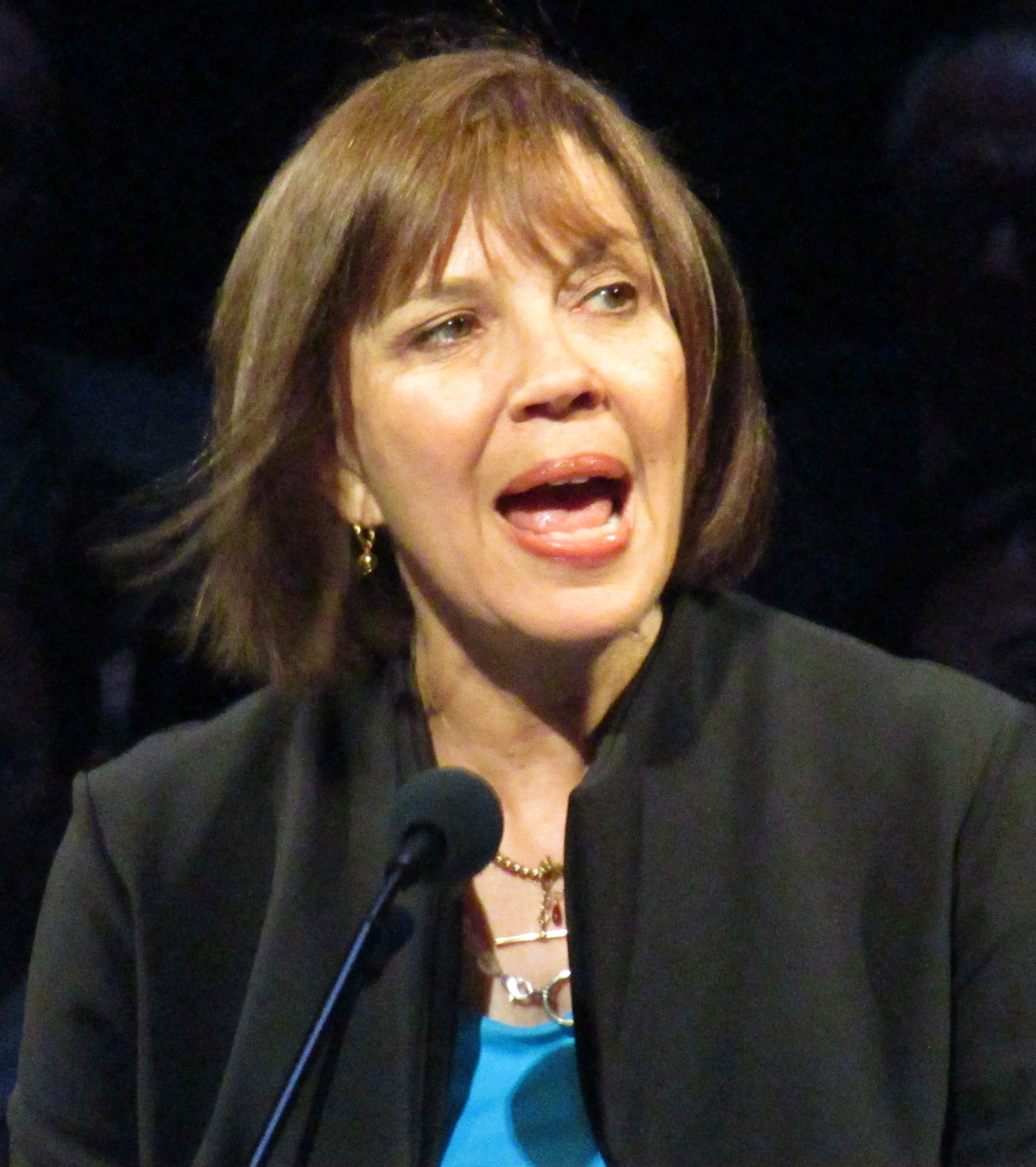
- Miller in 2018
- Born: January 2, 1948 (age 78); New York City, U.S.
- Education: Barnard College (BA); Princeton University (MPA)
- Spouse: Jason Epstein (m. 1993; died 2022)
- Relatives: Bill Miller (father); Jimmy Miller (half-brother)

Judith Miller (born January 2, 1948) is an American journalist and commentator who is known for writing about Iraq's alleged weapons of mass destruction (WMD) program both before and after the 2003 invasion, but her writings were later discovered to have been based on fabricated intelligence. She worked in the Washington bureau of The New York Times before joining Fox News in 2008.

Miller co-wrote a book Germs: Biological Weapons and America's Secret War, which became a top New York Times best seller shortly after she was a victim of a hoax anthrax letter at the time of the 2001 anthrax attacks.

The New York Times determined that several stories she wrote about Iraq were inaccurate, and she was forced to resign from the paper in 2005. According to commentator Ken Silverstein, Miller's Iraq reporting "effectively ended her career as a respectable journalist". Miller defended her reporting, stating "My job isn't to assess the government's information and be an independent intelligence analyst myself. My job is to tell readers of The New York Times what the government thought about Iraq's arsenal." She published a memoir, The Story: A Reporter's Journey, in April 2015.

Miller was involved in the Plame Affair, where Valerie Plame was outed as a Central Intelligence Agency (CIA) spy by Richard Armitage after Plame’s husband published a New York Times op-ed casting doubts on claims that Saddam Hussein sought to purchase uranium from Africa. Miller spent 85 days in jail for refusing to reveal that her source in the Plame Affair was Scooter Libby, chief of staff to Vice President Dick Cheney. Later, she contributed to the conservative Fox News Channel and Newsmax, and was a fellow at the conservative Manhattan Institute.

== Early life and education ==
Miller was born in New York City. Her Russian-born father, Bill Miller, was Jewish. He owned the Riviera night club in New Jersey and later, he operated several casinos in Las Vegas. Bill Miller was known for booking iconic Las Vegas performers. His biggest success was getting Elvis Presley to return to Las Vegas after initially being an unsuccessful booking. Her mother was a "pretty Irish Catholic showgirl."

Miller attended Ohio State University, where she was a member of the Kappa Alpha Theta sorority. She graduated from Barnard College of Columbia University in 1969 and received a master's degree in public affairs from Princeton University's School of Public and International Affairs. Early in her career at The New York Times bureau in Washington, D.C. she dated one of the newspaper's other reporters (and future investment banker) Steven Rattner. In 1993, she married Jason Epstein, an editor and publisher.

Judith Miller is the half-sister of Jimmy Miller who was a record producer for many classic rock bands of the 1960s through to the 1990s including the Rolling Stones, Traffic and Blind Faith.

== Career ==
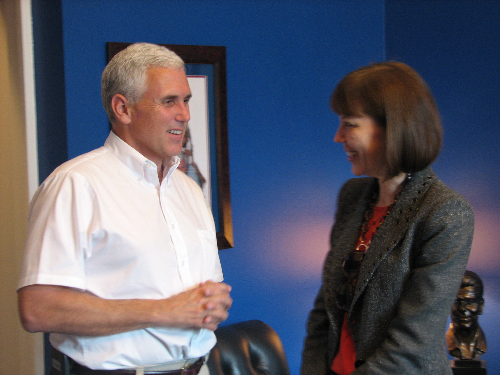
Miller and Mike Pence in 2005

During Miller's tenure at The New York Times, she was a member of the team that won the Pulitzer Prize for Explanatory Reporting, for its 2001 coverage of global terrorism before and after the September 11 attacks. She and James Risen received the award and one of the cited articles appeared under her byline.

Her writing during this period was criticized by Middle East scholar Edward Said for evincing an anti-Islamic bias. In his book Covering Islam, Said stated that Miller's book God Has Ninety-Nine Names "is like a textbook of the inadequacies and distortions of media coverage of Islam." He criticized her poor grasp of Arabic, saying that "nearly every time she tries to impress us with her ability to say a phrase or two in Arabic she unerringly gets it wrong ... They are the crude mistakes committed by a foreigner who neither has care nor ... respect for her subject." He concluded Miller

fears and dislikes Lebanon, hates Syria, laughs at Libya, dismisses Sudan, feels sorry for and a little alarmed by Egypt and is repulsed by Saudi Arabia. She hasn't bothered to learn the language and is relentlessly only concerned with the dangers of Islamic militancy, which, I would hazard a guess, accounts for less than 5 percent of the billion-strong Islamic world.

=== Anthrax hoax victim ===
On October 12, 2001, Miller opened an anthrax hoax letter mailed to her New York Times office. The 2001 anthrax attacks had begun occurring in the wake of the September 11 attacks in 2001, with anthrax-laced letters sent to ABC News, CBS News, NBC News, and the New York Post, all in New York City, as well as the National Enquirer in Boca Raton, Florida. Two additional letters (with a higher grade of anthrax) were sent on October 9, 2001, to Senators Tom Daschle and Patrick Leahy in Washington.

Miller was the only major U.S. reporter, and The New York Times was the only major U.S. media organization, to be the target of a fake anthrax letter in the fall of 2001. Miller had reported extensively on the subject of biological threats and had co-authored, with Stephen Engelberg and William Broad, a book on bio-terrorism, Germs: Biological Weapons and America's Secret War, which was published on October 2, 2001. Miller co-authored an article on Pentagon plans to develop a more potent version of weaponized anthrax, "U.S. Germ Warfare Research Pushes Treaty Limits", published in The New York Times on September 4, 2001, weeks before the first anthrax mailings.

=== Islamic charities search leak ===
Shortly after the September 11 attacks, the U.S. government was considering adding the Holy Land Foundation to a list of organizations with suspected links to terrorism and was planning to search the premises of the organization. The information about the impending raid was given to Miller by a confidential source. On December 3, 2001, Miller telephoned the Holy Land Foundation for comment, and The New York Times published an article in the late edition papers and on its website that day. The next day, the government searched HLF's offices. These occurrences led to a lawsuit brought by Attorney General Alberto Gonzales, with prosecutors claiming that Miller and her colleague Philip Shenon had queried this Islamic charity, and another, in ways that made them aware of the planned searches.

=== Iraq War ===
At The New York Times, Miller wrote on security issues, particularly about Iraq and weapons of mass destruction. Many of these stories later turned out to have been based upon faulty information. (One of her stories that was not disproved reported that inspectors in Iraq "saw nothing to prompt a war.")

On September 8, 2002, Miller and her Times colleague Michael R. Gordon reported the interception of "aluminum tubes" bound for Iraq. Her front-page story quoted unnamed "American officials" and "American intelligence experts" who said the tubes were intended to be used to enrich nuclear material, and cited unnamed "Bush administration officials" who said that, in recent months, Iraq had "stepped up its quest for nuclear weapons and [had] embarked on a worldwide hunt for materials to make an atomic bomb". Miller added that

Mr. Hussein's dogged insistence on pursuing his nuclear ambitions, along with what defectors described in interviews as Iraq's push to improve and expand Baghdad's chemical and biological arsenals, have brought Iraq and the United States to the brink of war.

Shortly after Miller's article was published, Condoleezza Rice, Colin Powell, and Donald Rumsfeld appeared on television and pointed to Miller's story in support of their position. As summarized by The New York Review of Books, "in the following months, the tubes would become a key prop in the administration's case for war, and the Times played a critical part in legitimizing it." Miller later said of the controversy

[M]y job isn't to assess the government's information and be an independent intelligence analyst myself. My job is to tell readers of The New York Times what the government thought about Iraq's arsenal.

In an April 21, 2003 article, Miller, ostensibly on the basis of statements from the military unit in which she was embedded, reported claims allegedly made by an Iraqi scientist that Iraq had kept biological and chemical weapons until "right before the invasion." This report was covered extensively in the press. Miller went on The NewsHour with Jim Lehrer and stated:

Well, I think they found something more than a smoking gun. What they've found is a silver bullet in the form of a person, an Iraqi individual, a scientist, as we've called him, who really worked on the programs, who knows them firsthand, and who has led MET Alpha people to some pretty startling conclusions.

There was strong internal dissent amongst other Times reporters regarding publication of the inflammatory, unsourced accusations, however, and that the military were allowed to censor it before it appeared. A week after it appeared, one Times insider called Miller's piece "wacky-assed" and complained there were "real questions about it and why it was on page 1."

On May 26, 2003, Howard Kurtz of The Washington Post reported on a Miller internal email sent to John Burns, the Times' Baghdad bureau chief. In it she admitted her source regarding the alleged WMDs, according to Seymour Hersh writing for The New Yorker, was none other than Ahmed Chalabi's Iraqi National Congress, which alleges Pentagon officials passed on to Miller, despite the Central Intelligence Agency disagreeing with its content. Her Times editor, Andrew Rosenthal, criticized Kurtz for its release.

A year later, on May 26, 2004, a week after the U.S. government apparently severed ties with Chalabi, a Times editorial acknowledged that some of the paper's coverage in the run-up to the war had relied too heavily on Chalabi and other Iraqi exiles, who were bent on regime change. The editorial also expressed "regret" that "information that was controversial [was] allowed to stand unchallenged." However, the editorial explicitly rejected "blame on individual reporters."

On May 27, 2004, the day after the Times' mea culpa, James C. Moore quoted Miller in an article in Salon:

You know what, ... I was proved fucking right. That's what happened. People who disagreed with me were saying, 'There she goes again.' But I was proved fucking right."

The statement about being "proved ... right" was in relation to another Miller story, wherein she had written that trailers found in Iraq had been shown to be mobile weapons labs. However that claim, too, was subsequently refuted as false.

It was alleged later in Editor & Publisher that, while Miller's reporting "frequently [did] not meet published Times standards", she was not sanctioned and was given a relatively free rein, because she consistently delivered frequent front-page scoops for the paper by "cultivating top-ranking sources."

In 2005, facing federal court proceedings for refusing to divulge a source in the Plame affair criminal investigation, Miller spent 85 days in jail in Alexandria, Va. (where French terrorist Zacarias Moussaoui was also held). After her release, the Times' Public Editor Byron Calame wrote:

Ms. Miller may still be best known for her role in a series of Times articles in 2002 and 2003 that strongly suggested Saddam Hussein already had or was acquiring an arsenal of weapons of mass destruction ... Many of those articles turned out to be inaccurate ... [T]he problems facing her inside and outside the newsroom will make it difficult for her to return to the paper as a reporter.

Two weeks later, Miller negotiated a private severance package with Times' publisher Arthur Ochs Sulzberger Jr. She contested Calame's claims about her reporting and gave no ground in defending her work. She cited "difficulty" in performing her job effectively after having become "an integral part of the stories [she] was sent to cover."

In a 2018 interview with The Intercept, James Risen defended Miller by saying that there was a "systemic problem at the paper" in regards to reporting about the existence of WMDs. He said the paper wanted "stories about the existence of WMD" rather than "skeptical stories".

=== Contempt of court ===
On October 1, 2004, federal judge Thomas F. Hogan found Miller in contempt of court for refusing to appear before a federal grand jury, which was investigating who had leaked to reporters the fact that Valerie Plame was a CIA operative. Miller did not write an article about the subject at the time of the leak, but others did, notably Robert Novak, spurring the investigation. Judge Hogan sentenced her to 18 months in jail, but stayed the sentence while her appeal proceeded. On February 15, 2005, the United States Court of Appeals for the District of Columbia Circuit unanimously upheld Judge Hogan's ruling. On June 17, 2005, the US Supreme Court declined to hear the case. On July 6, 2005, Judge Hogan ordered Miller to serve her sentence at "a suitable jail within the metropolitan area of the District of Columbia". She was taken to Alexandria City Jail on July 7, 2005.

In a separate case, Federal Judge Robert W. Sweet ruled on February 24, 2005, that Miller was not required to reveal who in the government leaked word of an impending raid to her. Patrick Fitzgerald, the same prosecutor who had had Miller jailed in the Plame case, argued that Miller's calls to groups suspected of funding terrorists had tipped them off to the raid and allowed them time to destroy evidence. Fitzgerald wanted Miller's phone records to confirm the time of the tip and determine who had leaked the information to Miller in the first place. Judge Sweet held that because Fitzgerald could not demonstrate in advance that the phone records would provide the information he sought the prosecutor's needs were outweighed by a 'reporter's privilege' to keep sources confidential. On August 1, 2006, a three-judge panel of the Second Circuit Court of Appeals reversed Judge Sweet's decision, holding 2–1 that federal prosecutors could inspect the telephone records of Miller and Philip Shenon. Judge Ralph K. Winter, Jr. wrote: "No grand jury can make an informed decision to pursue the investigation further, much less to indict or not indict, without the reporters' evidence".

Prior to her jailing for civil contempt, Miller's lawyers argued that it was pointless to imprison her because she would never talk or reveal confidential sources. Under such circumstances, argued her lawyers, jail term would be "merely punitive" and would serve no purpose. Arguing that Miller should be confined to her home and could forego Internet access and cellphone use, Miller's lawyers suggested that "impairing her unrestricted ability to do her job as an investigative journalist ... would present the strictest form of coercion to her". Failing that, Miller's lawyers asked that she be sent to a women's facility in Danbury, Connecticut, nearer to "Ms. Miller's 76-year-old husband", retired book publisher Jason Epstein, who lived in New York City, and whose state of health was the subject of a confidential medical report filed by Miller's attorneys. Upon being jailed, the Times reported on July 7, 2005, that Miller had purchased a cockapoo puppy to keep her husband company during her absence.

On September 17, 2005, The Washington Post reported that Miller had received a "parade of prominent government and media officials" during her first 11 weeks in prison, including visits by former U.S. Republican Senator Bob Dole, NBC News anchor Tom Brokaw, and John R. Bolton, U.S. Ambassador to the United Nations. After her release on September 29, 2005, Miller agreed to disclose to the grand jury the identity of her source, Lewis Libby, Vice President Cheney's chief of staff.

On Tuesday, January 30, 2007, Miller took the stand as a witness for the prosecution against Lewis Libby. Miller discussed three conversations she had had with Libby in June and July 2003, including the meeting on June 23, 2003. In her first appearance before the grand jury, Miller said she could not remember. According to The New York Times, when asked if Libby discussed Valerie Plame, Miller responded in the affirmative, "adding that Libby had said Wilson worked at the agency's (C.I.A.) division that dealt with limiting the proliferation of unconventional weapons". The trial resulted in guilty verdicts against Libby.

=== Refusal to disclose her source ===
In July 2005, several months prior to her October 2005 resignation from The New York Times, Miller was jailed for contempt of court for refusing to testify before a federal grand jury which was investigating a leak in which Valerie Plame was named as a CIA officer. While Miller never wrote about Plame, she was believed to be in possession of evidence which was relevant to the leak investigation. According to a subpoena, Miller met with an unnamed government official, later revealed to be I. Lewis "Scooter" Libby, Vice President Dick Cheney's Chief of Staff, on July 8, 2003. Plame's CIA identity was publicly divulged in a column by conservative political commentator Robert Novak on July 14, 2003. Rather than Libby, Novak's source was revealed to have been Richard Armitage of the Department of State.

On July 16, 2005, The Washington Post reported that Miller could face criminal contempt charges, which could have extended her jail time six months beyond the four months which were then anticipated. The Post suggested that special prosecutor Patrick Fitzgerald was particularly interested in hearing Miller's version of her encounter with Libby. Filings by Fitzgerald reportedly alleged that Miller's defiance of the court constituted a crime. On September 29, 2005, after spending 85 days in jail, Miller was released following a telephone call with Libby. He had reconfirmed the release of confidentiality. Under oath, Miller was questioned by Fitzgerald before a federal grand jury the following day, September 30, 2005, but was not relieved of contempt charges until after testifying again on October 12, 2005.

For her second grand jury appearance, Miller produced a notebook from a previously undisclosed meeting with Libby on June 23, 2003. This was several weeks before Joseph Wilson's New York Times editorial was published. This belied the theory that Libby was retaliating against Wilson for his Times editorial. According to Miller's notes from that earlier meeting, Libby disclosed that Joseph Wilson's wife was a CIA employee who was involved in her husband's trip to Niger. Miller's notebook from her July 8, 2003, meeting with Libby contains the name "Valerie Flame [sic]". This reference occurred six days before Novak published Plame's name and unmasked her as a CIA operative.

Miller's grand jury account was the basis for her last article in The New York Times. The newspaper published Miller's first-person account, "My Four Hours Testifying in the Federal Grand Jury Room", on October 16, 2005. Miller said she could not remember who gave her the name "Valerie Plame" but she was sure it did not come from Libby.

Miller testified as a witness on January 30, 2007, at the trial of Scooter Libby, which began in January 2007. The trial ended on March 6, 2007, with Libby's conviction on four of five counts, but none of the counts had to do with his actual revealing of Plame's name to the media.

=== Independent writing ===
Since leaving The New York Times, Miller has continued her work as a writer in Manhattan and has contributed several op-ed pieces to The Wall Street Journal. On May 16, 2006, she summarized her investigations on U.S. foreign policy regarding Libya's dismantling of its weapons programs in an essay published in two parts.

On May 17, 2006, NavySEALs.com and MediaChannel.org published an exclusive interview with Miller in which she detailed how the attack on the USS Cole led her to investigate Al-Qaeda and, in July 2001, to her receiving information from a top-level White House source concerning top-secret NSA signals intelligence (SIGINT) about an impending Al-Qaeda attack, possibly against the continental United States. Two months later, on September 11, Miller and her editor at the Times, Stephen Engelberg, both regretted not writing that story.

On September 7, 2007, she was hired as an adjunct fellow of the Manhattan Institute for Policy Research, a neo-conservative free-market think tank. Her duties included being a contributing editor for the organization's publication, City Journal. On October 20, 2008, Fox News announced that it had hired Miller.

As of 2018, she is a member of the Council on Foreign Relations. She has also been a member of the Aspen Strategy Group, and has served on a prestigious National Academy of Sciences panel examining how best to expand of the work of the Cooperative Threat Reduction program, which since 1991 has sought to stop the spread of WMD material and expertise from the former Soviet Union. She lectures frequently on the Middle East, Islam, terrorism, biological and chemical weapons, as well as other national security topics.

=== The Iraq War revisited ===
On April 3, 2015, The Wall Street Journal published an op-ed piece by Miller in which she defended her comportment during the lead-up to the war in Iraq, as well as the Bush administration's stance and decisions regarding the war. "Officials [of the Bush administration] didn't lie, and I wasn't fed a line," she wrote. Miller acknowledged that "there was no shortage of mistakes about Iraq, and I made my share of them. The newsworthy claims of some of my prewar WMD stories were wrong", but rejected the notion that "I took America to war in Iraq. It was all me", which according to her "continue[d] to have believers".

Critics subsequently wrote that "Miller's war reporting was disastrously wrong, and now she's trying desperately to spin it all away,". Valerie Plame commented that while "no one is crediting [Miller] with starting the Iraq war," and she was "not actually on the team that took us into the biggest, most tragic US foreign policy debacle ever ... [Miller's] attempt to re-write history is both pathetic and self-serving."

The Guardian wrote that "in arguing that Bush was a victim of faulty intelligence analysis, Miller ignores extensive reporting showing that the Bush administration was making plans for an Iraq invasion before the advent of intelligence used to justify it."

Others focused on what they termed as factual inaccuracies, such as Miller's claim that "Hans Blix, the former chief of the international weapons inspectors, bears some responsibility [for the war]" because he "told the U.N. in January 2003 that despite America's ultimatum, Saddam was still not complying fully with his U.N. pledges." Her critics pointed out that, although Blix indeed reported that "Iraq wasn't fully compliant," he also reported that Iraq was "largely cooperative with regard to process," and, subsequently, "made it abundantly clear, in an interview published in The New York Times, that nothing he'd seen at the time justified war," an interview taken by Miller herself.

=== Memoir ===
In April 2015, Miller published The Story: A Reporter's Journey, a memoir that focused largely on her reporting during the second Gulf War. Her former colleague Neil Lewis characterized most of the reviews as "unreservedly critical". Writing in The New York Times, former Los Angeles Times reporter Terry McDermott wrote that although "this is not a score-settling book", he found it "sad and flawed". Ιn The Washington Post, Erik Wemple wrote that the book's "dynamic" of "Judy Miller against the world" lends her book an aspect that is "both depressing and desperate". A review in the Columbia Journalism Review called the book "less a memoir than an apologia and an assault". In The Daily Beast, Lloyd Grove characterized Miller's work as "self-pitying". Criticizing Miller's failure to fully take responsibility for the flaws in her reporting, Matt Taibbi wrote in Rolling Stone: "Most of The Story is a tale of dog after scheming dog eating Miller's homework. ... Mostly, she just had a lot of rotten luck. Or at least, that's how it reads. It's a sweeping, epic non-apology. Every bad thing Miller has ever been accused of turns out to be wrong or taken out of context, according to her."

== Bibliography ==
- One, by One, by One: Facing the Holocaust, Simon & Schuster (1990), ISBN 0-671-64472-6
- Saddam Hussein & the Crisis in the Gulf (with Laurie Mylroie) Random House USA Inc (1990), ISBN 0-09-989860-8
- God Has Ninety Nine Names: Reporting from a Militant Middle East, Simon & Schuster (1997), ISBN 0-684-83228-3
- Germs: Biological Weapons and America's Secret War (with William Broad and Stephen Engelberg) Simon & Schuster (2001), ISBN 0-684-87158-0
- The Story: A Reporter's Journey, Simon & Schuster (April 7, 2015), ISBN 978-1476716015

== See also ==
- Reporters' privilege
- Journalistic scandal
