= Jason Epstein =

American editor and publisher (1928–2022)

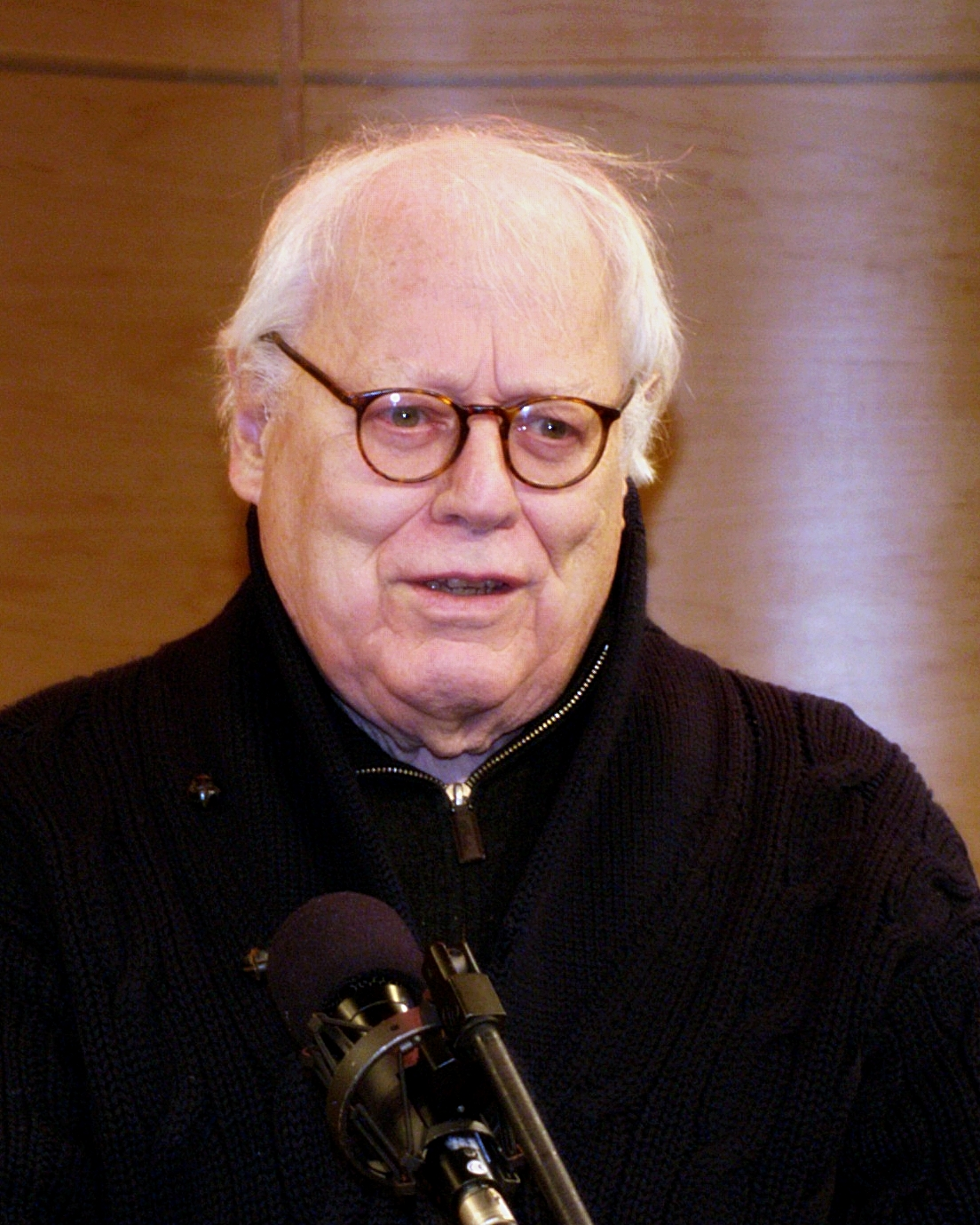
- Epstein in 2011
- Born: Jason Epstein; August 25, 1928; Cambridge, Massachusetts, U.S.
- Died: February 4, 2022 (aged 93); Sag Harbor, New York, U.S.
- Education: Columbia University (BA, MA)
- Occupation: Editor
- Spouses: Barbara Zimmerman (m. 1954; div. 1990) Judith Miller (m. 1993)
- Children: 2
- Family: Bill Miller (father-in-law); Jimmy Miller (brother-in-law)

Jason Wolkow Epstein (August 25, 1928 – February 4, 2022) was an American editor and publisher. He was the editorial director of Random House from 1976 to 1995. He also co-founded The New York Review of Books in 1963.

== Early life ==
Epstein was born in Cambridge, Massachusetts, on August 25, 1928. His father, Robert, worked as a partner in the family textile business; his mother, Gladys (Shapiro), was a housewife. His family was Jewish. An only child, he attended public schools in Milton, Massachusetts, completing high school at age 15. He studied English literature at Columbia University, where he was elected to Phi Beta Kappa. He graduated with a bachelor's degree in 1949, before obtaining a Master of Arts the following year.

== Career ==
After graduating, Epstein joined Doubleday and Company as an editorial trainee, earning $45 a week. While working there, he saw the need for inexpensive, well-made paperbacks of the kinds of books that his classmates, many of them veterans studying on the G.I. Bill, were reading but could not afford to own in their hardcover editions. With the support of Ken McCormick, Doubleday's chief editor, he launched Anchor Books in 1953. This was the first so-called Quality Paperbacks, which quickly became the dominant paperback format. In 1954 Anchor Books won the Carey–Thomas Award.

Epstein left Doubleday in 1958, frustrated at the company's refusal to publish Vladimir Nabokov's controversial novel, Lolita. He joined Random House publishers, and eventually became editorial director in 1976, serving in that capacity until 1995. At Random House, he edited such writers as Jane Jacobs, Norman Mailer, Philip Roth, Gore Vidal, Vladimir Nabokov, E. L. Doctorow, Marvin Harris, Michael Korda, Benzion Netanyahu, Peter Matthiessen, and Paul Kennedy. He also worked with Ted Geisel, better known as Dr. Seuss, who arrived with storyboards to recite Green Eggs and Ham. He acquired a reputation of being rude and ridiculing other editors' suggestions. He admitted that he was a "disagreeable presence" as he had little patience with other people. Nevertheless, he continued to edit the company's most valuable authors after being relieved of his post as editorial director in 1984.

During the New York newspaper strike of 1963, Epstein, his wife Barbara, and their friends Robert Lowell and Elizabeth Hardwick founded The New York Review of Books, The New York Review of Books, a magazine dedicated to the serious reviewing of books. Since Epstein was working for Random House and couldn't also be the editor of the magazine, they turned to their friend Robert B. Silvers to be its editor along with Epstein's wife, Barbara. Epstein had his list of distribution contacts from Anchor Books, and Robert Lowell invested $4,000 from his trust fund to get the company started. The first issue came out on February 1, 1963. It sold out and 2,000 letters arrived urging them to continue. Although he retired in 1999, he continued to be affiliated with the publisher and edited books into his eighties.

In 1979, Epstein took up and forwarded the critic Edmund Wilson's concept for the Library of America, well-made, reliable editions of important American writers similar to the French Pleiade editions. With the support of the Ford Foundation and the National Endowment for the Humanities, the first volumes were published in 1982. He later published The Reader's Catalogue of 40,000 titles available by mail order, an analog precursor of online book selling. In 2004, he co-founded On Demand Books, marketer of the Espresso Book Machine, which reproduces a paperback book from a digital file in a few minutes. Epstein predicted that the Espresso Book Machine will supplant the 500-year-old Gutenberg printing press technology.

== Awards ==
Epstein was the inaugural recipient of the National Book Award for Distinguished Service to American Letters in 1988. He was presented with the Lifetime Achievement Award of the National Book Critics Circle in 2001, before being conferred the Philolexian Award for Distinguished Literary Achievement six years later. He also received the Curtis Benjamin Award of the Association of American Publishers for Creative Publishing.

== Publications ==
External videos
- Booknotes interview with Epstein on Book Business: Publishing Past, Present and Future, 2001, C-SPAN

His essays and reviews have appeared in The New York Times Magazine, The New York Review of Books, and Condé Nast Traveler, among other publications. He is the author of the following books:

- The Great Conspiracy Trial: An Essay on Law, Liberty, and the Constitution. Random House (1970) ISBN 0394419065
- East Hampton: A History and Guide (with Elizabeth Barlow) Random House (1985) ISBN 978-0394727363
- Book Business: Publishing Past, Present and Future. W. W. Norton & Company (2001) ISBN 0393049841
- Eating: A Memoir. Alfred A. Knopf (2010) ISBN 978-1400078257

In his book, Book Business: Publishing Past, Present, and Future, Epstein writes about working in the New York offices of Random House. He tells of W. H. Auden delivering the manuscript of The Dyer's Hand in a torn overcoat and slippers, Dr. Seuss reciting Green Eggs and Ham to the staff, Terry Southern writing scenes for Dr. Strangelove on a wooden table in the basement, a diffident Andy Warhol bowing and scraping to Epstein, John O'Hare showing off his Rolls-Royce in the courtyard, and Ralph Ellison smoking a cigar in Epstein's office and using his hands to explain "how Thelonious Monk developed his chords."

E. L. Doctorow's 1989 novel Billy Bathgate was dedicated to Epstein.

== Personal life ==
Epstein married Barbara Zimmerman in 1954. They met while working at Doubleday, and their fathers knew each other. Together, they had two children: Jacob and Helen. The couple divorced in 1990. Three years later, he married Judith Miller, a reporter for The New York Times and daughter of impresario Bill Miller. They remained married until his death.

Epstein died on February 4, 2022, at his home in Sag Harbor, New York. He was 93 and had suffered from congestive heart failure prior to his death.
