= Bill Miller (impresario) =

Russian-American impresario (1904–2002)

- Born: 1904; Pinsk, Russian Empire
- Died: December 9, 2002 (aged 98); Palm Springs, California, U.S.
- Citizenship: American
- Occupation: Impresario
- Known for: Entertainment director of the Sahara, Dunes, Flamingo and International hotels in Las Vegas
- Spouses: Anne Wingate; Denise B. Miller; and two others
- Children: Jimmy Miller; Judith Miller; Susan Miller
- Family: Jason Epstein (son-in-law)

Bill Miller (1904 – December 9, 2002) was a Russian-born American impresario, best known for serving as the entertainment director for several large casino hotels in Las Vegas from the 1950s to the 1970s. He was the father of music producer Jimmy Miller and of The New York Times reporter Judith Miller.

== Biography ==
Miller was born to a Jewish family in Pinsk —then Russian Empire, current Belarus— in 1904, the son of Lena and David Miller. He did not know his family's original surname. The family immigrated to the United States when William was a year old, first settling in Brooklyn, New York, and then Jersey City, New Jersey. His father worked as a building tradesman, and he had one sister, Mollie Miller Vine.

Miller dropped out of high school after two years to pursue a career as a vaudeville dancer as part of the duo Miller and Peterson. He danced professionally until he was 30, after which he worked as a vaudeville agent. He became an entrepreneur operating the original Luna Park in Coney Island. In 1945, he purchased the Riviera, a nightclub overlooking the Hudson River in Fort Lee, New Jersey, which had closed during World War II, and renamed it Bill Miller's Riviera. He booked many of the top acts at the time including Tony Martin, Frank Sinatra, Dean Martin, Jerry Lewis, Sammy Davis Jr., Joey Bishop, Mae West, and Tito Puente. In 1953, the Riveria was shuttered to make way for the Palisades Parkway.

Also in 1953, Miller purchased a 10% interest in the Sahara hotel and casino and moved to Las Vegas at the invitation of Milton Prell (who had founded the Sahara in 1952), becoming its entertainment director. Starting afresh, as many of his former acts had already been taken to Las Vegas by former Copacabana Club employee, Jack Entratter, he hired Ray Bolger, Donald O'Conner, and Marlene Dietrich. He also pioneered the Las Vegas lounge show concept, booking Louis Prima, Keely Smith, and Sam Butera.

In 1955, Miller left the Sahara and bought an interest in the new Dunes hotel and casino, where he again worked as the entertainment director. At the Dunes, he developed the first of the big Las Vegas production "feathershows", named Smart Affairs, and later developed burlesque shows Lido de Paris and the Folies Bergere with his former producer in New Jersey, Donn Arden. Miller operated a hotel in the Dutch West Indies, before returning to Las Vegas where he served as the entertainment director of the Flamingo (founded by Bugsy Siegel and purchased in 1967 by Kirk Kerkorian), where he helped to launch the career of Sonny and Cher with Phil Spector. In 1969, Miller worked at Kerkorian's new hotel, The International, where he booked Barbra Streisand and revived the career of Elvis Presley. The International became the world's largest resort hotel during his tenure. Miller retired in the 1970s.

== Personal life ==
Miller died on December 9, 2002, in Palm Springs, California, at the age of 98.

Miller married four times. He was survived by his fourth wife, Denise B. Miller. He had three children, record producer and musician Jimmy Miller (who predeceased him in the 1990s and was previously married to Australian television personality, actress and singer Kerri-Anne Wright), reporter Judith Miller of The New York Times (married to editor Jason Epstein), and Susan Miller; and a stepson, Jerry Johnson.
