= Mark Danner =

American writer, journalist, and educator

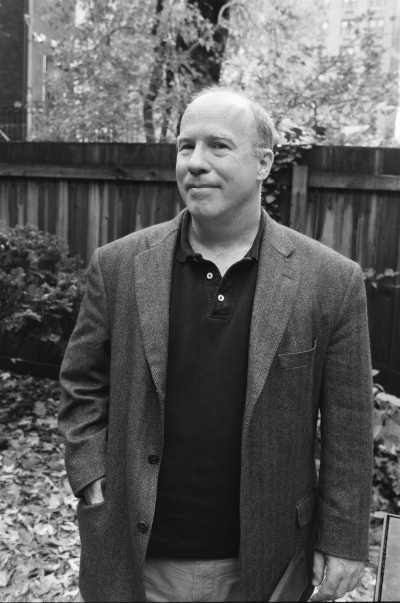
- Danner in the garden of his New York apartment
- Born: November 10, 1958 (age 68); Utica, New York, US
- Education: Harvard University
- Occupations: Author, journalist, professor
- Organizations: UC Berkeley; Bard College; The New Yorker; The New York Review of Books
- Website: markdanner.com

Mark David Danner (born November 10, 1958) is an American writer, journalist, and educator. He is a former staff writer for The New Yorker and frequent contributor to The New York Review of Books. Danner specializes in U.S. foreign affairs, war and politics, and has written books and articles on Haiti, Central America, the former Yugoslavia, and the Middle East, as well as in American politics, covering every presidential election since 2000. In 1999, he was named a MacArthur Fellow.

As of 2018, Danner holds the Class of 1961 Distinguished Chair in Undergraduate Education at UC Berkeley and the James Clarke Chace Professor of Foreign Affairs and the Humanities at Bard College.

Danner is a member of the Berkeley Collegium, the Council on Foreign Relations, the World Affairs Council of Northern California, and the Century Association, and is a fellow of the Institute of the Humanities at New York University. In 2008 he was named the Marian and Andrew Heiskell Visiting Critic at the American Academy in Rome, a post he took up again in 2010. Danner has had a longtime association with the Telluride Film Festival, where he introduces films and conducts interviews, and in 2013, he was named resident curator there.

== Background and education ==
Danner was born at Utica, New York. He attended Utica Free Academy, a public high school, and then Harvard College, where he graduated, magna cum laude, in 1981 with a degree in modern literature and aesthetics. At Harvard, he studied with Stanley Cavell, Robert Kiely, Stanley Hoffmann, and Frank Kermode, who was Danner's tutor in 1977-78 when he was the Charles Eliot Norton Lecturer and became Danner's mentor and friend.

== Career ==
=== Early years ===
After leaving Harvard, Danner joined the staff of The New York Review of Books, where he worked as an assistant to editor Robert B. Silvers from 1981 to 1984. In 1984, he moved to Harper's Magazine as a senior editor. In 1986, he joined The New York Times Magazine, where he specialized in foreign affairs and politics, writing pieces about nuclear weapons and about the fall of the Duvalier dictatorship in Haiti, among other stories.

=== The New Yorker and El Mozote ===
In 1990, Danner joined the staff of The New Yorker shortly after the magazine published his three-part series on Haiti, "A Reporter at Large: Beyond the Mountains".

On December 6, 1993, for only the second time in its history, The New Yorker devoted its entire issue to one article, Danner's piece, "The Truth of El Mozote", an investigation into the El Mozote massacre in El Salvador, thought to be one of the worst atrocities in modern Latin American history. The Mozote article became the basis for Danner's first book, The Massacre at El Mozote: A Parable of the Cold War, which was published in 1994. The New York Times Book Review recognized The Massacre at El Mozote as one of its "Notable Books of the Year."

=== The Balkans and The New York Review of Books ===
During the mid-1990s Danner began reporting on the wars in the Balkans, writing a series of eleven extended articles for The New York Review of Books, which began with Danner's cover piece, "The US and the Yugoslav Catastrophe" (November 20, 1997) and concluded with "Kosovo: The Meaning of Victory", (July 15, 1999).

His 16,000-word essay, "Marooned in the Cold War: America, the Alliance and the Quest for a Vanished World," which warned of the risks of expanding NATO to the East, and appeared in World Policy Journal (Fall 1997), provoked a prolonged exchange of letters and responses from Assistant Secretary of State Richard Holbrooke, Deputy Secretary of State Strobe Talbott, Congressman Lee H. Hamilton, and former Ambassador George F. Kennan.

=== Iraq and the War on Terror ===
Danner began writing about the war on terror soon after September 11, 2001, publishing "The Battlefield in the American Mind" in The New York Times in October of that year. He began speaking out against invading Iraq, notably in a series of debates with Christopher Hitchens, Leon Wieseltier, Michael Ignatieff, David Frum, William Kristol and others. He reported from Iraq for The New York Review of Books in a series of lengthy dispatches including "Iraq: How Not to Win a War" (September 25, 2003), "Delusions in Baghdad" (February 12, 2004), and "The War of the Imagination" (December 21, 2006).

In May 2005 Danner wrote an essay for The New York Review accompanying the first American publication of the so-called "Downing Street Memo", the leaked minutes of a July 2002 meeting of high-level British officials that confirmed that when it came to the debate over whether to go to war in Iraq, "the intelligence and facts were being fixed around the policy," and that the invasion of Iraq was in fact a foregone conclusion. The essay provoked a number of responses and led to two subsequent essays, all of which were collected, along with relevant documents and a preface by The New York Times columnist Frank Rich, in 2006 in The Secret Way to War: the Downing Street Memo and the Iraq War's Buried History.

=== Torture and Abu Ghraib ===
Beginning in the spring of 2004, he wrote a series of essays for The New York Review of Books on the emerging torture scandal that came to be known as Abu Ghraib. In October 2004, he collected these essays and gathered them, together with a series of government documents and reports, into his book, Torture and Truth: America, Abu Ghraib and the War on Terror.

In March 2009, Danner published an essay in The New York Review, "US Torture: Voices from the Black Sites", which revealed the contents of a secret International Committee of the Red Cross report based on testimony from "high-value detainees" in the "War on Terror," who had been captured, held, and interrogated at secret US prisons—the so-called "black sites". Shortly thereafter, he published a second essay, "The Red Cross Report: What it Means" and released the full text of the report on The New York Review website. Weeks later, President Obama ordered released four Justice Department memos in which the Bush administration purported "to legalize torture." Senior Obama officials Rahm Emanuel and David Axelrod claimed publicly that the memos' release was prompted by publication of the Red Cross Report.

In October 2016, Brian Lamb sat down with Mark Danner to talk about his book, Spiral: Trapped in the Forever War, which looked at the 15-year-old war on terror. The interview aired on C-SPAN on Oct. 27, 2016.

=== Mark Danner On Donald Trump ===
In the spring of 2016, Danner began covering the 2016 general election for The New York Review of Books, profiling then Republican presidential candidate Donald Trump on his campaign trail. In May, The New York Review of Books published "The Magic of Donald Trump," and on Dec. 22, the magazine published "The Real Trump." In March 2017, The Review published Danner's "What Could He Do?," which chronicles Trump's first days in office.

Danner continued his coverage of Donald Trump in the 2020 election. In October 2020, The New York Review published "The Con He Rode In On," outlining the fallacies and damage of the Trump Presidency and campaign. After the 2020 election, Danner attended the Trump rally at the White House ellipse on January 6, marching to the U.S. Capitol, and reported on it in his pieces "Be Ready to Fight" and "The Slow-Motion Coup".

Danner continued his coverage of Trump for The New York Review throughout the 2024 election cycle, writing "The Grievance Artist" and "Getting out the Fear Vote." In the fall of 2026, Danner published Crossing the Rubicon: The Betrayal of American Democracy 2000 - 2026 which collects much of his political reporting during the first quarter of the twenty-first century.

== Other works ==
=== Books ===
In addition to The Massacre at El Mozote (1994), Torture and Truth (2004), The Secret Way to War (2006), and Crossing the Rubicon (2026), Danner is the author of The Road to Illegitimacy: One Reporter's Travels through the 2000 Florida Recount (2003) Stripping Bare the Body: Politics Violence War (2009), and Spiral: Trapped in the Forever War (2016).

=== Television and commentary ===
Danner co-wrote and helped produce two-hour-long television documentaries for ABC News' Peter Jennings Reporting series: "While America Watched: The Bosnian Tragedy" and "House on Fire: America's Haitian Crisis", which both aired in 1994. Danner wrote and executive produced an eight-part television series for Israeli director Dror Moreh entitled "Corridors of Power: Should America Police the World," which aired on BBC Four in 2024, with Meryl Streep's narration. As commentator, Danner has appeared on The Charlie Rose Show, The MacNeil-Lehrer NewsHour and Bill Moyers Journal on PBS, CNN's Prime News, The Situation Room, and Anderson Cooper 360, ABC's World News Now, C-Span's Morning Show, and The Rachel Maddow Show on MSNBC, among others.

== Academic career ==
Since 2000, Danner has been a Professor of Journalism at the University of California, Berkeley. In 2002 he also accepted a Henry R. Luce professorship in Human Rights and Journalism at Bard College, where, in 2006, he was named the James Clarke Chace Professor of Foreign Affairs and the Humanities. As of 2021, he holds the Class of 1961 Distinguished Chair in Undergraduate Education at UC Berkeley. He teaches foreign affairs, politics, and literature, including seminars on foreign reporting, war and revolution, crisis management, Faulkner, Hemingway, Chekhov, and Tolstoy. At Bard he conducts seminars on politics and literature, including on torture, utopia, Faust, the picaresque, drone warfare, and the politics of the War on Terror. In April 2010, Danner delivered the Tanner Lectures on Human Values at Stanford, entitled "Torture and the Forever War: Living in the State of Exception." From 2011 to 2012, Danner taught politics and literature, including courses on the Arab Spring, on the politics of dictatorships and on drone warfare, at Al Quds University in Jerusalem.

== Honors and awards (selected) ==
=== Winner ===
- 1990 National Magazine Award for Reporting. "A Reporter at Large: Beyond the Mountains," The New Yorker
- 1993 Overseas Press Award. The Madeline Dane Ross Award for Best International Reporting for "The Truth of El Mozote,"
- 1994 Latin American Studies Association (LASA) Special Media Award for "The Truth of El Mozote,"
- 1994 Emmy Award for "While America Watched: The Bosnia Tragedy," ABC News Peter Jennings Reporting
- 1995 DuPont Gold Baton for "While America Watched: The Bosnia Tragedy," Peter Jennings Reporting.
- 1998 Overseas Press Award. The Ed Cunningham Award for "Yugoslav Wars", The New York Review of Books.
- 1999 MacArthur Fellow. The John D. and Catherine T. MacArthur Foundation.
- 2004 Overseas Press Award. The Madeline Dane Ross Award for For Torture and Truth
- 2006 Carey McWilliams Award, American Political Science Association.
- 2006 Best American Political Writing, for "Taking Stock of the Forever War".
- 2007 The Best American Essays, for "Iraq: The War of the Imagination."
- 2016–17 Andrew Carnegie Fellow, April 2016.
- 2019 Guggenheim Fellow, April 2019

=== Finalist ===
- 2014 Ryszard Kapuscinski Award for Literary Reportage

== Personal life ==
In 2011, while teaching at Al Quds University in Palestine, Danner met Michelle Sipe of Gainesville, Florida, a Victorian Literature professor. They married in 2014 and have two children, Grace Beth Danner and Truman Leo Danner. The family divide their time between their house in the Berkeley hills of California and the Hudson Valley of New York State.

== Published works ==
=== Books ===
- Crossing the rubicon: the betrayal of American democracy, 2000-2026. New York: New York Review Books. 2026. ISBN 979-8-89623-089-2.
- Spiral: Trapped in the Forever War. New York: Simon & Schuster. 2016. ISBN 978-1-4767-4776-7.
- Stripping Bare the Body: Politics Violence War. New York: Nation Books. 2009. ISBN 978-1-56858-413-3.
- The Secret Way to War: The Downing Street Memo and the Iraq War's Buried History. New York: New York Review Books. 2006. ISBN 978-1-59017-207-0.
- The Road to Illegitimacy: One Reporter's Travels through the 2000 Florida Vote Recount. New Jersey: Melville House. 2004. ISBN 978-0-9749609-6-8.
- Torture and Truth: America, Abu Ghraib, and the War on Terror. New York: New York Review Books. 2004. ISBN 978-0-679-41532-9.
- The Massacre at El Mozote: A Parable of the Cold War. New York: Vintage. 1994. ISBN 0-679-75525-X.

=== Reporting and Essays (selected) ===
- "Haiti: Beyond the Mountains I". The New Yorker. November 27, 1989.
- "Haiti: Beyond the Mountains II". The New Yorker. December 4, 1989.
- "Haiti: Beyond the Mountains III". The New Yorker. December 11, 1989.
- "America and the Bosnia Genocide". The New York Review of Books. December 4, 1997. Archived from the original on May 30, 2011.
- "Bosnia: The Turning Point". The New York Review of Books. February 5, 1998.
- "Bosnia: The Great Betrayal". The New York Review of Books. March 26, 1998.
- "The Lost Olympics". The New York Review of Books. November 2, 2000.
- "The Battlefield in the American Mind". The New York Times. October 16, 2001.
- "The Struggles of Democracy and Empire". The New York Times. October 9, 2002.
- "Iraq: The New War". The New York Review of Books. September 25, 2003.
- "Abu Ghraib: The Hidden Story". The New York Review of Books. October 7, 2004.
- "Taking Stock of the Forever War". The New York Times Magazine. September 11, 2005.
- "Clinton & Colombia: The Privilege of Folly". The New York Review of Books. October 5, 2005.
- "Iraq: The War of the Imagination". The New York Review of Books. December 21, 2006. Archived from the original on July 27, 2011.
- "US Torture: Voices from the Black Sites". The New York Review of Books. April 9, 2009. Archived from the original on July 27, 2011.
- "The Red Cross Torture Report: What It Means". The New York Review of Books. April 30, 2009.
- "To Heal Haiti, Look to History, Not Nature". The New York Times. October 21, 2010.
- "After September 11: Our State of Exception". The New York Review of Books. October 13, 2011.
- "Rumsfeld's War and Its Consequences Now" The New York Review of Books. December 19, 2013.
- "Donald Rumsfeld Revealed" The New York Review of Books. January 9, 2014.
- "Rumsfeld: Why We Live in His Ruins" The New York Review of Books. February 6, 2014.
- "The Darkness of Dick Cheney" The New York Review of Books. March 6, 2014.
- "He Remade Our World" The New York Review of Books. April 3, 2014.
- "Cheney: "The More Ruthless the Better"". The New York Review of Books. May 8, 2014.
- "How Robert Gates Got Away With It" The New York Review of Books. August 24, 2014.
- "State of Siege: Their Torture, and Ours". The Criterion Collection. May 27, 2015.
- "The CIA: The Devastating Indictment". The New York Review of Books. February 5, 2015.
- "The Magic of Donald Trump". The New York Review of Books. May 26, 2016.
- "On the Election– II". The New York Review of Books. November 10, 2016.
- "The Real Trump". The New York Review of Books. December 22, 2016.
- "What He Could Do". The New York Review of Books. March 23, 2017.
- "Moving Backward: Hypocrisy and Human Rights". The New York Review of Books. June 1, 2020.
- "The Con He Rode In On". The New York Review of Books. October 21, 2020.
- "'Be Ready to Fight'". The New York Review of Books. January 14, 2021
- "Reality Rebellion". The New York Review of Books. July 1, 2021.
- "We're in an Emergency - Act Like It!" The New York Review of Books. August 18, 2022.
- "The Slow-Motion Coup (Part 1)". The New York Review of Books. September 14, 2022.
- "The Grievance Artist". The New York Review of Books. November 2, 2023.
- "Getting out the Fear Vote". The New York Review of Books. November 7, 2024.
- "Trump's Constitutional Dictatorship," The New York Review of Books. August 20, 2026.

=== Lectures and Interviews (selected) ===
- "Conversations with History: Being A Writer". Mark Danner interviews Harry Kreisler. March 2, 1999.
- "Torture and Truth: War on Terror" (Lecture: video). C-SPAN. January 13, 2005.
- "You Can Do Anything With a Bayonet Except Sit on It" (Interview: transcript). Interviewed by Tom Engelhardt. Tomdispatch.com. February 26, 2006.
- "The Secret Way to War" (Lecture: video). C-SPAN. July 11, 2006.
- "The Politics of the Forever War: Terror, Rights, and George Bush's State of Exception" (video) (lecture). 2006 Remarque Lecture at NYU. November 14, 2006.
- "Living with Literature: From Reading The Iliad to Covering Iraq". Living with Literature (Interview: audio). Interviewed by Muriel "Aggie" Murch. KWMR. April 20, 2007. Archived from the original on December 4, 2018.
- "Author Sheds Light on CIA's 'Black Sites'". All Things Considered (Interview: audio). Interviewed by Jacki Lyden. NPR. March 15, 2009.
- "Secret Report on CIA Jails" (Interview: video). Interview with Greta Brawner. C-SPAN. March 17, 2009.
- "Mark Danner: Bush Lied About Torture of Prisoners" (Interview: transcript). Interviewed by Amy Goodman. Democracy Now!. March 18, 2009.
- "Obama and America in the World". Bill Moyers Journal (Interview: video/transcript). Interviewed by Bill Moyers. PBS. October 16, 2009.
- "Stripping Bare the Body: 6 Questions for Mark Danner" (Interview). Interviewed by Scott Horton. The Stream. October 28, 2009.
- "Stripping the Body Bare" (Interview: video). Interview with Nancy Jarvis. C-SPAN. November 12, 2009.
- Kronos Quartet Symposium: Centennial Anniversary of WWI. Mark Danner speaks on the impact of WWI. April 4, 2014.
- The Management of Savagery: The Islamic State, Extreme Violence and Our Endless War Presented by The Human Rights Project. Tuesday, December 1, 2015
- Rethinking Washington's Counterterrorism Strategy Virtual roundtable with Peter Leyden, Rachel Kleinfeld, Stephen Walt and Suzanna Nossel. Part of the ReInvent media series, December 8, 2015
- "The Forever War" (Interview: video). Interview with Nancy Jarvis. The World Affairs Council. July 29, 2016.
- "Trapped in the Forever War" (Interview). Interview with Rose Aguilar. KALW. August 5, 2016.
- "Q&A with Mark Danner" (Interview: video). Interview with Brian Lamb. C-SPAN. October 27, 2016.
- Townsend Center Berkeley Book Chat: Mark Danner with Joyce Carol Oates Joyce Carol Oates and Mark Danner speak about his Book Spiral: Trapped in the Forever War. February 28, 2018.
- Mark Danner in Conversation with Robert Hass at UC Berkeley Robert Hass and Mark Danner discuss Mark's career. April 12, 2018.
- "The Death of Human Rights: Drones, Torture and the New Nationalism," The Robert B. Silvers Lecture, New York Public Library December 3, 2019.
- "Writing Crises: The Broken Self and the Broken World". Mark Danner and Sarah Manguso in conversation for Tuesday Talks, an online series curated by the American Society in Rome, April 20, 2022.

=== Anthologies and Introductions ===
- Schmertz, Eric J. (1997). President Reagan and the World. Santa Barbara, CA: Greenwood Press. ISBN 0-313-30115-8.
- Towell, Larry (introduction by Mark Danner) (1997). El Salvador: Photographs by Larry Towell. New York: W.W. Norton & Company. ISBN 0-393-03944-7.
- Buckley, William J., ed. (2000). Kosovo: Contending Voices on Balkan Interventions. New York: Wm. B. Eerdmans Publishing. ISBN 0-8028-3889-8.
- Danner, Mark; et al. (2003). Violence in War and Peace: An Anthology. New York: Blackwell Readers in Anthropology. ISBN 0-631-22348-7.
- Levi Strauss, David, ed. (2004). Abu Ghraib: The Politics of Torture. Berkeley: North Atlantic Books. ISBN 1-55643-550-9.
- Engelhardt, Tom, ed. (2006). Mission Unaccomplished: Tomdispatch Interviews with American Iconoclasts and Dissenters. New York: Nation Books. ISBN 1-56025-938-8.
- Szanto, Andras, ed. (2007). What Orwell Didn't Know: Propaganda and the New Face of American Politics. New York: Public Affairs. ISBN 978-1-58648-560-3.
- Engelhardt, Tom, ed. (2008). The World According to Tomdispatch: America in the New Age of Empire. New York: Verso. ISBN 978-1-84467-257-8.
- Silvers, Robert B., ed. (2008). The Consequences to Come: American Power After Bush. New York: New York Review Books. ISBN 978-1-59017-298-8.
- de Segur, Phillipe-Paul (introduction by Mark Danner) (2008). Defeat: Napoleon's Russian Campaign. New York: NYRB Classics. ISBN 978-1-59017-282-7.
- Flippin, Royce, ed. (2006). Best American Political Writing 2006. New York: Public Affairs. ISBN 978-1-56025-912-1.
- Wallace, David Foster, ed. (2007). Best American Essays 2007. New York: Mariner Books. ISBN 978-0-618-70927-4.
- Flippin, Royce, ed. (2009). Best American Political Writing 2009. New York: Public Affairs. ISBN 978-1-58648-783-6.
