= A Splendid Intelligence =

2021 book by Cathy Curtis

A Splendid Intelligence: The Life of Elizabeth Hardwick
- Author: Cathy Curtis
- Language: English
- Subject: Elizabeth Hardwick
- Publisher: W. W. Norton & Company
- Publication date: November 16, 2021
- Pages: 400
- ISBN: 978-1-324-00552-0

A Splendid Intelligence: The Life of Elizabeth Hardwick is a 2021 book by Cathy Curtis that examines the life of Elizabeth Hardwick.
