= Emily Greenhouse =

American journalist and editor

Emily Greenhouse (born 1986) is an American journalist. She became the editor of The New York Review of Books in March 2021, after having been appointed co-editor in March 2019.

== Education and career ==
Greenhouse graduated from Pelham Memorial High School and went on to graduate from Wesleyan University in 2008.

Greenhouse began her career as a freelance researcher and writer in Paris. She worked as an editorial assistant at Granta magazine, in London, in 2009 and 2010. From 2011 to 2012, she worked as an editorial assistant to Robert B. Silvers, the co-founder of The New York Review of Books. From 2012 to 2014, she worked as editorial assistant to David Remnick, the editor of The New Yorker. Greenhouse joined Bloomberg as a reporter in 2014, focusing on gender and politics. In 2016, she returned to The New Yorker as the managing editor, where she remained until 2019. Tapped to lead The New York Review of Books following Ian Buruma’s departure, she returned to the publication in 2019.

== Selected works ==
- Greenhouse, Emily (2015-10-07). "Inside the Wesleyan Molly Bust". Rolling Stone.
- Greenhouse, Emily (2015-11-15). "Life and Death on the Boulevard Voltaire". The New Republic. ISSN 0028-6583.
- Greenhouse, Emily (2015-05-19). "The Not-So-Feminist History of Wonder Woman". The Nation. ISSN 0027-8378.
- Greenhouse, Emily (2014-06-26). "A Facebook Page of Our Own: Binders Full of Women Writers". Vogue.

== Personal life ==
Greenhouse is the daughter of Steven Greenhouse, the longtime New York Times labor and workplace reporter. She is married to Martin Mulkeen.
