= The 50 Year Argument =

2014 film directed by Martin Scorsese

- US theatrical release poster
- Directed by: Martin Scorsese; David Tedeschi
- Produced by: Martin Scorsese; David Tedeschi; Margaret Bodde
- Narrated by: Michael Stuhlbarg
- Cinematography: Ellen Kuras; Lisa Rinzler
- Edited by: Paul Marchand; Michael J. Palmer
- Distributed by: HBO Documentary Films; BBC Arena
- Release dates: June 9, 2014 (UK); August 29, 2014 (U.S.)
- Running time: 97 mins.
- Countries: United Kingdom; Japan; United States
- Language: English

The 50 Year Argument is a documentary film by Martin Scorsese and co-directed by David Tedeschi about the history and influence of the New York Review of Books, which marked its 50th anniversary in 2013. The documentary premiered in June 2014 at the Sheffield Doc/Fest and was soon screened in Oslo and Jerusalem before airing on the British Arena television series in July. It was also screened at the Telluride Film Festival and the Toronto International Film Festival and was seen at the New York Film Festival, in September, and at other film festivals. It first aired on HBO in September 2014 and was given other national broadcasts. It had a limited theatrical release in Toronto in 2015.

The film uses a combination of archival footage, quotes from the Review and contemporary interviews to give a view of the coverage of the journal over its half-century of publication, focusing on how its writers and editors have approached the larger issues of the day. Reviews of the film have been mostly warm.

== Description ==
The 97-minute film is a "hop-scotching journey through the NYRB's history". Scorsese and Tedeschi "delve into the journal's eventful fifty-year history, from its emergence during the writer strikes and Civil Rights Movement of the 1960s through to the Arab Spring uprisings in Egypt, Libya and Syria. ... [They] aim to offer not just an overview of the Review's half-century history, but also seek to highlight some of the newsworthy events that the magazine has covered in-depth since its conception. ... [I]t's the monumental clashes of intellect that really capture the imagination." They "present a fascinating account of a publication that defies the modern culture of news reporting" but "avoid probing its political character beyond saluting a broad interest in human rights ... a few dissenting voices among the cheerleaders might have added a little necessary grit." The film's title "is a reference to how the ... publication has so frequently exposed stories less reported and made challenges to the mainstream during its time."

"Anchored by the old-world charm" of the editor of the New York Review of Books, Robert Silvers, the film focuses on notable contributors to, and articles in, the Review; it "slides fluidly between handsomely shot contemporary interviews and well-curated retro footage. ... Michael Stuhlbarg reads the spare voiceover while a vintage jazz soundtrack invokes a lost golden age of uptown Manhattan sophistication." The articles' texts are "enlightened by the rich visual illustration with which they're accompanied. ... Scorsese [chooses] to have many famous articles read by their authors", which is sometimes poignant, and results in "a thematically dense but wholly accessible film about how fifty years of sensuous ideas can open a dialogue towards social and political change." The film has been variously characterized as "a warm, engaging, celebratory love letter from one New York institution to another" and "a bracing film about the value of radical ideas and the importance of being courageous enough to consider them."

Silvers said of the Review as a documentary subject: "The book review sounds like it might be quiet, but it can be extremely intense and revelatory. It can have a lot of power – or that's what you hope for."

== Production and release ==
To help celebrate and memorialize the 50th anniversary of the 1963 debut of The New York Review of Books, Silvers approached Scorsese, who is known as an avid reader of the Review, with the idea to make a documentary about the paper. Scorsese said, "I have learned so much over the years from The New York Review of Books – it's given me so much that I jumped at the chance to make this film ... a film about the adventure of thought, and, as Colm Toibin puts it, the sensuality of ideas." The film took 18 months to produce.

The documentary screened as a work in progress at the Berlin International Film Festival in February 2014 and premiered in June 2014 at the Sheffield Doc/Fest. It was also screened in Oslo in June and at the Jerusalem Film Festival in July. The film was shown on British television on the Arena documentary series in July and at the Telluride Film Festival in August. In September, it was seen at the Toronto International Film Festival, the Calgary International Film Festival, and the New York Film Festival. It first aired on HBO on September 29, 2014 and was screened at the Tokyo Film Festival in October. Other film festival screenings in 2014 were held in Rio de Janeiro, Mumbai, Denmark, St. Louis, and it was broadcast on television in Japan. The film was released for public showings in a theatre in Toronto in January 2015.

== Reception ==
Press reviews at the early screenings were generally favorable, noting that the filmmakers captured the two key factors of the magazine's half century: its long-form reviews of the great books of the time, and its independent take on political and historical events. Some reviewers felt that Scorsese and Tedeschi were noticeably well disposed to the Review. The Hollywood Reporter called the film "a warm, engaging, celebratory love letter from one New York institution to another" but commented on "the irony of a film that champions serious criticism without containing any serious criticism itself." The English newspaper The Guardian concurred, observing that Scorsese and Tedeschi "are here to celebrate the magazine, not challenge it. It's testament to their skill, as much as the NYRB's commitment to good stories, thoroughly told, that you find yourself rooting for the staff." Variety, though concurring that the film "comes mainly to lionize", remarked that it successfully encapsulates the paper's origins and first years, its modern day-to-day operations under Silvers, and a detailed examination of the Review's most important articles and contributors. The Times said, "Scorsese's nose for mafia-style feuds works well in this study of the literati who inhabit the Review's august and book-tsunamied offices in New York's Village."

An Indiewire reviewer wrote, in previewing the film for its HBO release: "The 50 Year Argument ... is a must-see. ... It reveals how many pivotal cultural arguments were started at the NYRB ... the movie visualizes and captures videos ... to remind us of some of the great debates over the decades." Brooklyn Magazine called it "a moving and memorable tribute to something that matters." A reviewer at The Washington Post commented that "the film does a thoughtful and appealing job of opening up the rarefied literary realm of the NYRB to a viewer who may have never heard of it." Another at the Pittsburgh Post-Gazette wrote: "The 50-Year Argument is a rare animal among documentaries because it honors intellectualism — a dirty word in some quarters — rather than a person or an event and proves that ideas are powerful and effective in the hands of serious-minded people."
