= Riviera (nightclub) =

Coordinates: 40°51′20″N 73°57′37″W

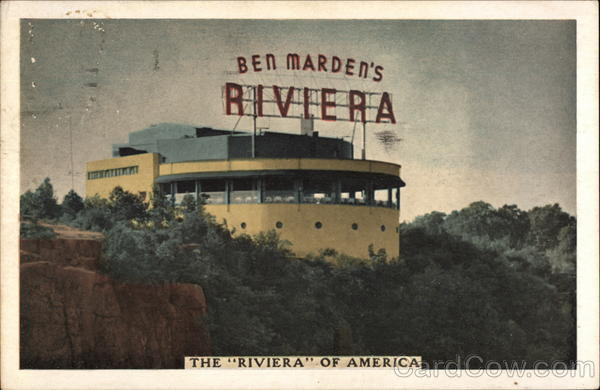
- Interactive map of the Riviera area

General information
- Status: Demolished
- Classification: Nightclub
- Year built: 1937
- Demolished: 1954

Design and construction
- Architect: Louis Abramson

Other information
- Seating capacity: 800–900

The Riviera was a nightclub in Fort Lee, New Jersey, just outside of New York City, from 1931 to 1953. For most of its history it was located overlooking the Hudson River adjacent to the George Washington Bridge.

== History ==
The Riviera was first opened by Ben Marden in 1931 in Fort Lee on Hudson Terrace, near Myrtle Avenue near the George Washington Bridge. The first Riviera building burned to the ground on Thanksgiving night, 1936.

Arshile Gorky executed a mural for the club in the winter of 1940–1941.

Marden reopened the Riviera, at a location closer to the George Washington Bridge, in June 1937. Its new building, which featured in 1941 in Architectural Digest, was a "state-of-the-art architectural wonder," and had a retractable roof, a rotating stage, and glass windows which slid down to the floor. It was a forerunner of Las Vegas hotels and used to also be a casino. The Riviera closed during rationing at the start of the early years of World War II, and was re-opened in 1946 by Bill Miller, father of reporter Judith Miller, who bought the club for $500–700,000. It had a capacity of over 900, and could earn over $100,000 a week.

The land that the nightclub was on was deemed necessary to make way for the Palisades Interstate Parkway, including the surrounding parkland, and the Riviera was forced to close.

It closed permanently on Sunday, October 4, 1953, with Eddie Fisher and Henny Youngman performing on the closing night. It was demolished in 1954 with Miller receiving $758,000 compensation for his property.

== Performers ==
Among those who appeared at the Riviera were Frank Sinatra, Tony Martin, Dean Martin, Jerry Lewis, Sammy Davis Jr., Marge Champion, Joe E. Lewis, Sophie Tucker, Harry Richman, Eddie Fisher and Jane Froman.

== Bibliography ==
Austin, Tom; Kase, Ronald J. (2011). Bill Miller's Riviera: America's showplace in Fort Lee, New Jersey. Charleston, SC: History Press. ISBN 9781609494568. OCLC 754389858. (144 pages)
