= Barbara Epstein =

American literary editor (1928–2006)

- Epstein in 1993
- Born: Barbara Zimmerman; August 30, 1928; Boston, Massachusetts, U.S.
- Died: June 16, 2006 (aged 77); New York City, U.S.
- Occupation: Literary editor
- Spouse: Jason Epstein (m. 1954; div. 1990)
- Partner: Murray Kempton (until 1997)
- Children: 2

Barbara Epstein (née Zimmerman; August 30, 1928 – June 16, 2006) was an American literary editor and founding co-editor of The New York Review of Books.

== Life and work ==
Epstein, née Zimmerman, was born in Boston, Massachusetts, to a Jewish family, and graduated from Radcliffe College in 1949. In 1953, she and editor Jason Epstein began a marriage that lasted 37 years.

Epstein rose to prominence as the editor at Doubleday of Anne Frank's The Diary of a Young Girl, among other books. She next worked at Dutton, McGraw-Hill, and the Partisan Review. During the New York newspaper strike of 1963, Barbara and Jason Epstein, together with friends Robert Lowell and Elizabeth Hardwick, founded the biweekly magazine The New York Review of Books, which Barbara called "the paper". She and Robert B. Silvers became the editors. Barbara Epstein remained at the New York Review of Books as an editor for 43 years.

The Epsteins divorced in 1990; Barbara Epstein lived with journalist Murray Kempton until his death in 1997. She continued in her editing until shortly before her death.

Epstein died on June 16, 2006, of lung cancer in New York City at the age of 77.
