= Elizabeth Hardwick (writer) =

American writer and literary critic (1916–2007)

- Hardwick in the 1980s
- Born: July 27, 1916; Lexington, Kentucky, U.S.
- Died: December 2, 2007 (aged 91); New York City, U.S.
- Education: University of Kentucky (BA, MA); Columbia University
- Occupations: Literary critic; essayist; novelist
- Spouse: Robert Lowell (m. 1949; div. 1972)
- Writing career
- Notable awards: Guggenheim Fellowship; American Academy of Arts and Letters (1977)

Elizabeth Bruce Hardwick (July 27, 1916 – December 2, 2007) was an American literary critic, novelist, and short story writer.

== Early life and education ==
Elizabeth Bruce Hardwick was born as the eighth of eleven children in Lexington, Kentucky, United States, on July 27, 1916, to strict Protestant parents, the daughter of Eugene Allen Hardwick, a plumbing and heating contractor, and Mary (née Ramsey) Hardwick.

She graduated from the University of Kentucky with a BA degree in 1938 and with an MA in 1939. She entered the PhD program at Columbia University, though withdrew from graduate study in 1941 to concentrate on writing. She was awarded a Guggenheim Fellowship in 1947.

== Career ==
In 1959, Hardwick published "The Decline of Book Reviewing" in Harper's Magazine, a generally harsh and even scathing critique of book reviews published in American periodicals of the time. She published four books of criticism: A View of My Own (1962), Seduction and Betrayal (1974), Bartleby in Manhattan (1983), and Sight-Readings (1998). In 1961, she edited The Selected Letters of William James.

The 1962 New York City newspaper strike helped inspire Hardwick, Robert Lowell, Jason Epstein, Barbara Epstein, and Robert B. Silvers to found The New York Review of Books, a publication that became as much a habit for many readers as The New York Times Book Review, which Hardwick had eviscerated in her 1959 essay.

In the 1970s and early 1980s, Hardwick taught writing seminars at Barnard College and Columbia University's School of the Arts, Writing Division. She gave forthright critiques of student writing and was a mentor to students she considered promising.

She was elected a fellow of the American Academy of Arts and Sciences in 1996. In 2000, she published a short biography, Herman Melville, in Viking Press's Penguin Lives series.

In 2008, the Library of America selected Hardwick's account of Caryl Chessman's crimes for inclusion in its two-century retrospective of American True Crime writing. A collection of her short fiction, The New York Stories of Elizabeth Hardwick, was published posthumously in 2010, as was The Collected Essays of Elizabeth Hardwick in 2017.

In 2021, Cathy Curtis published a biography of Hardwick, A Splendid Intelligence: The Life of Elizabeth Hardwick.

== Personal life ==
From July 28, 1949, until their eventual divorce in 1972, Hardwick was married to Robert Lowell, the Pulitzer Prize‐winning poet from the prominent Boston Brahmin family. Despite the difficulties of their often tumultuous union, Hardwick maintained that Lowell was the best thing that had ever happened to her. Their daughter was Harriet Lowell.

Hardwick died in a Manhattan hospital on December 2, 2007, aged 91.

== Published works ==
=== Fiction ===
- The Ghostly Lover. New York: Harcourt, Brace & Company. 1945. ISBN 0912946962.
- The Simple Truth. New York: Harcourt, Brace & Company. 1955. ISBN 0912946989.
- Sleepless Nights. New York: Random house. 1979. ISBN 0394505271.
- The New York Stories of Elizabeth Hardwick. New York: New York Review Books. 2010. ISBN 978-1590172872. (Posthumous; edited by Darryl Pinckney)

=== Nonfiction ===
- A View of My Own: Essays in Literature and Society. New York: Farrar, Straus and Cudahy. 1962. ISBN 0912946911.
- Seduction and Betrayal: Women and Literature. New York: Random house. 1974. ISBN 039449069X.
- Bartleby in Manhattan and Other Essays. New York: Random House. 1983. ISBN 0394528808.
- Sight-Readings: American Fictions. New York: Random house. 1998. ISBN 0375501274.
- Herman Melville. New York: Viking Adult. 2000. ISBN 0670891584. (Published as part of the Penguin Lives Series)
- The Collected Essays of Elizabeth Hardwick. New York: New York Review Books. 2017. ISBN 978-1681371542. (Posthumous; edited by Darryl Pinckney)
- The Uncollected Essays of Elizabeth Hardwick. New York: New York Review Books. 2022. ISBN 978-1681376233. (Posthumous; edited by Alex Andriesse)
