= The New York Review of Books =

American magazine

- Cover of the November 5, 2020, issue
- Categories: Literature; culture; current affairs
- Frequency: Approximately semi-monthly
- Publisher: Rea S. Hederman
- Total circulation: 132,522 (2017)
- First issue: February 1, 1963
- Country: United States
- Based in: New York City, New York
- Language: English
- Website: nybooks.com
- ISSN: 0028-7504

The New York Review of Books (or NYREV or NYRB) is a semi-monthly magazine with articles on literature, culture, economics, science and current affairs. Published in New York City, it is inspired by the idea that the discussion of important books is an indispensable literary activity. Esquire called it "the premier literary-intellectual magazine in the English language". In 1970, writer Tom Wolfe described it as "the chief theoretical organ of Radical Chic".

The Review publishes long-form reviews and essays, often by well-known writers, original poetry, and has letters and personals advertising sections that had attracted critical comment. In 1979 the magazine founded the London Review of Books, which soon became independent. In 1990 it founded an Italian edition, la Rivista dei Libri, published until 2010. The Review has a book publishing division, established in 1999, called New York Review Books, which publishes reprints of classics, as well as collections and children's books. Since 2010, the journal has hosted a blog written by its contributors. The Review celebrated its 50th anniversary in 2013. A Martin Scorsese film called The 50 Year Argument documents the history and influence of the paper over its first half century.

Robert B. Silvers and Barbara Epstein edited the paper together from its founding in 1963 until Epstein's death in 2006. From then until his death in 2017, Silvers was the sole editor. Ian Buruma became editor in September 2017 and left the post in September 2018. Gabriel Winslow-Yost and Emily Greenhouse became co-editors in February 2019; in February 2021 Greenhouse was made editor.

== History and description ==
=== Early years ===
The New York Review was founded by Robert B. Silvers and Barbara Epstein, together with publisher A. Whitney Ellsworth and writer Elizabeth Hardwick. They were backed and encouraged by Epstein's husband, Jason Epstein, a vice president at Random House and editor of Vintage Books, and Hardwick's husband, poet Robert Lowell. In 1959 Hardwick had published an essay, "The Decline of Book Reviewing", in Harper's, where Silvers was then an editor, in a special issue that he edited called "Writing in America". Her essay was an indictment of American book reviews of the time, "light, little article[s]" that she decried as "lobotomized", passionless praise and denounced as "blandly, respectfully denying whatever vivacious interest there might be in books or in literary matters generally." The group was inspired to found a new magazine to publish thoughtful, probing, lively reviews featuring what Hardwick called "the unusual, the difficult, the lengthy, the intransigent, and above all, the interesting".

During the 1962–1963 New York City newspaper strike, when The New York Times and several other newspapers suspended publication, Hardwick, Lowell and the Epsteins seized the chance to establish the sort of vigorous book review that Hardwick had imagined. Jason Epstein knew that book publishers would advertise their books in the new publication, since they had no other outlet for promoting new books. The group turned to the Epsteins' friend Silvers, who had been an editor at The Paris Review and was still at Harper's, to edit the publication, and Silvers asked Barbara Epstein to co-edit with him. She was known as the editor at Doubleday of Anne Frank's Diary of a Young Girl, among other books, and then worked at Dutton, McGraw-Hill and Partisan Review. Silvers and Epstein sent books to "the writers we knew and admired most. ... We asked for three thousand words in three weeks in order to show what a book review should be, and practically everyone came through. No one mentioned money." The first issue of the Review was published on February 1, 1963, and sold out its printing of 100,000 copies. It prompted nearly 1,000 letters to the editors asking for the Review to continue. The New Yorker called it "surely the best first issue of any magazine ever."

Salon later commented that the list of contributors in the first issue "represented a 'shock and awe' demonstration of the intellectual firepower available for deployment in mid-century America, and, almost equally impressive, of the art of editorial networking and jawboning. This was the party everyone who was anyone wanted to attend, the Black and White Ball of the critical elite." The Review "announced the arrival of a particular sensibility ... the engaged, literary, post-war progressive intellectual, who was concerned with civil rights and feminism as well as fiction and poetry and theater. The first issue projected "a confidence in the unquestioned rightness of the liberal consensus, in the centrality of literature and its power to convey meaning, in the solubility of our problems through the application of intelligence and good will, and in the coherence and clear hierarchy of the intellectual world". After the success of the first issue, the editors assembled a second issue to demonstrate that "the Review was not a one-shot affair". The founders then collected investments from a circle of friends and acquaintances, and Ellsworth joined as publisher. The Review began regular biweekly publication in November 1963.

The New York Review does not pretend to cover all the books of the season or even all the important ones. Neither time nor space, however, have been spent on books which are trivial in their intentions or venal in their effects, except occasionally to reduce a temporarily inflated reputation or to call attention to a fraud. ... The hope of the editors is to suggest, however imperfectly, some of the qualities which a responsible literary journal should have and to discover whether there is, in America, not only the need for such a review but the demand for one.

— From the only editorial ever published in the Review

Silvers said of the editors' philosophy, that "there was no subject we couldn't deal with. And if there was no book [on a subject], we would deal with it anyway. We tried hard to avoid books that were simply competent rehearsals of familiar subjects, and we hoped to find books that would establish something fresh, something original." In particular, "We felt you had to have a political analysis of the nature of power in America – who had it, who was affected". The editors also shared an "intense admiration for wonderful writers". But, Silvers noted, it is a mystery whether "reviews have a calculable political and social impact" or will even gain attention: "You mustn't think too much about influence – if you find something interesting yourself, that should be enough." Well-known writers were willing to contribute articles for the initial issues of the Review without pay because it offered them a chance to write a new kind of book review. As Mark Gevisser explained: "The essays ... made the book review form not just a report on the book and a judgment of the book, but an essay in itself. And that, I think, startled everyone – that a book review could be exciting in that way, could be provocative in that way." The Review pointedly published interviews with European political dissidents, including Alexander Solzhenitsyn, Andrei Sakharov and Václav Havel.

=== Since 1979 ===
During the year-long lockout at The Times in London in 1979, the Review founded a daughter publication, the London Review of Books. For the first six months this journal appeared as an insert in the New York Review of Books, but it became an independent publication in 1980. In 1990 the Review founded an Italian edition, la Rivista dei Libri. It was published for two decades until May 2010.

For over 40 years, Silvers and Epstein edited the Review together. In 1984, Silvers, Epstein and their partners sold the Review to publisher Rea S. Hederman, who still owns the paper, but the two continued as its editors. In 2006, Epstein died of cancer at the age of 77. In awarding to Epstein and Silvers its 2006 Literarian Award for Outstanding Service to the American Literary Community, the National Book Foundation stated: "With The New York Review of Books, Robert Silvers and Barbara Epstein raised book reviewing to an art and made the discussion of books a lively, provocative and intellectual activity."

After Epstein's death, Silvers was the sole editor until his own death in 2017. Asked about who might succeed him as editor, Silvers told The New York Times, "I can think of several people who would be marvelous editors. Some of them work here, some used to work here, and some are just people we know. I think they would put out a terrific paper, but it would be different." In 2008, the Review celebrated its 45th anniversary with a panel discussion at the New York Public Library, moderated by Silvers, discussing "What Happens Now" in the United States after the 2008 election of Barack Obama as president. Panelists included Review contributors such as Joan Didion, Garry Wills, novelist and literary critic Darryl Pinckney, political commentator Michael Tomasky, and Columbia University professor and contributor Andrew Delbanco. The 45th anniversary edition of the Review (November 20, 2008) began with a posthumous piece by Edmund Wilson, who wrote for the paper's first issue in 1963.

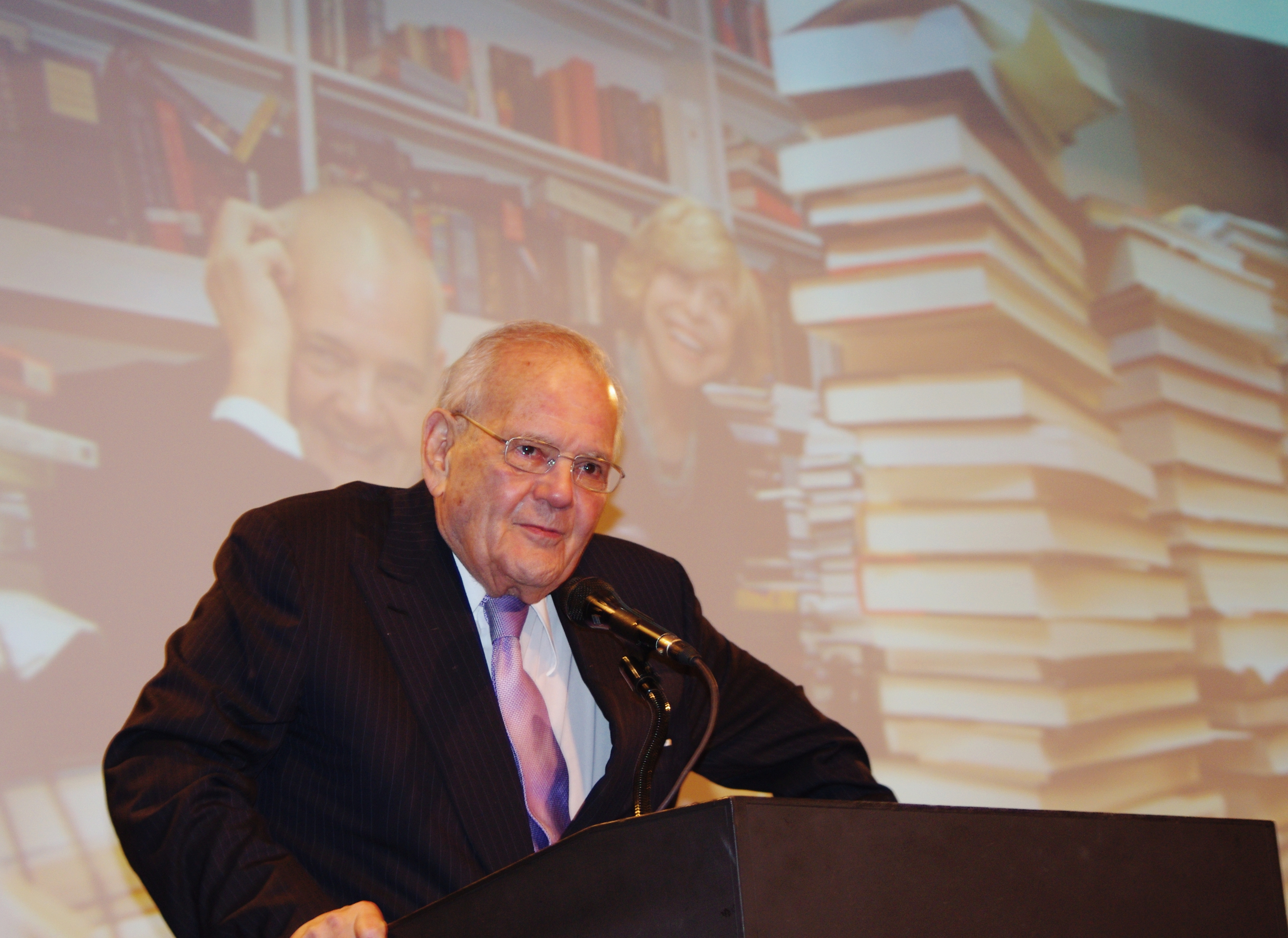
Robert Silvers in 2012

In 2008, the paper moved its headquarters from Midtown Manhattan to 435 Hudson Street located in the West Village. In 2010, it launched a blog section of its website that The New York Times called "lively and opinionated", and it hosts podcasts. Asked in 2013 how social media might affect the subject matter of the Review, Silvers commented:

"I might imagine [a] witty, aphoristic, almost Oscar Wildean [anthology of] remarks, drawn from the millions and millions of tweets. Or from comments that follow on blogs. ... Facebook is a medium in which privacy is, or at least is thought to be, in some way crucial. ... And so there seems a resistance to intrusive criticism. We seem at the edge of a vast, expanding ocean of words ... growing without any critical perspective whatever being brought to bear on it. To me, as an editor, that seems an enormous absence."

The Review began a year-long celebration of its 50th anniversary with a presentation by Silvers and several contributors at The Town Hall in New York City in February 2013. Other events included a program at the New York Public Library in April, called "Literary Journalism: A Discussion", focusing on the editorial process at the Review and a reception in November at the Frick Collection. During the year, Martin Scorsese filmed a documentary about the history and influence of the Review, and the debates that it has spawned, titled The 50 Year Argument, which premiered in June 2014 at the Sheffield Doc/Fest in England. It was later seen at various film festivals, on BBC television and on HBO in the US. Asked how he maintained his "level of meticulousness and determination" after 50 years, Silvers said that the Review "was and is a unique opportunity ... to do what one wants on anything in the world. Now, that is given to hardly any editor, anywhere, anytime. There are no strictures, no limits. Nobody saying you can't do something. No subject, no theme, no idea that can't be addressed in-depth. ... Whatever work is involved is minor compared to the opportunity." A special 50th anniversary issue was dated November 7, 2013. Silvers said:

An independent, critical voice on politics, literature, science, and the arts seems as much needed today as it was when Barbara Epstein and I put out the first edition of the New York Review fifty years ago – perhaps even more so. Electronic forms of communication grow rapidly in every field of life but many of their effects on culture remain obscure and in need of new kinds of critical scrutiny. That will be a central concern of the Review for the years to come.

Ian Buruma, who had been a regular contributor to the Review since 1985, became editor in September 2017. He left the position in September 2018 after backlash over publishing an essay by Jian Ghomeshi, who has been accused by 20 women of sexual assault, and defending the publication in an interview with Slate magazine. The Review stated that it did not follow its "usual editorial practices", as the essay "was shown to only one male editor during the editing process", and that Buruma's statement to Slate about the staff of the Review "did not accurately represent their views". Gabriel Winslow-Yost (formerly a senior editor at the Review) and Emily Greenhouse (formerly the managing editor of The New Yorker and earlier an editorial assistant at the Review) were named co-editors in February 2019; Daniel Mendelsohn, a longtime Review contributor, was named to the new position of "editor at large". In February 2021, Greenhouse was made editor of the Review, while Winslow-Yost became a senior editor.

In 2023, the Review moved its headquarters to 207 East 32nd Street in Kips Bay; it had purchased the townhouse in 2020 from graphic designer Milton Glaser.

=== Description ===
The Review has been described as a "kind of magazine ... in which the most interesting and qualified minds of our time would discuss current books and issues in depth ... a literary and critical journal based on the assumption that the discussion of important books was itself an indispensable literary activity." Each issue includes a broad range of subject matter, including "articles on art, science, politics and literature." Early on, the editors decided that the Review would "be interested in everything ... no subject would be excluded. Someone is writing a piece about Nascar racing for us; another is working on Veronese." The Review has focused, however, on political topics; as Silvers commented in 2004: "The pieces we have published by such writers as Brian Urquhart, Thomas Powers, Mark Danner and Ronald Dworkin have been reactions to a genuine crisis concerning American destructiveness, American relations with its allies, American protections of its traditions of liberties. ... The aura of patriotic defiance cultivated by the [Bush] Administration, in a fearful atmosphere, had the effect of muffling dissent." Silvers told The New York Times: "The great political issues of power and its abuses have always been natural questions for us."

The Nation gave its view of the political focus of the New York Review of Books in 2004:

The Review took a vocal role in contesting the Vietnam War. ... Around 1970, a sturdy liberalism began to supplant left-wing radicalism at the paper. As Philip Nobile observed in ... 1974 ... the Review returned to its roots and became "a literary magazine on the British nineteenth-century model, which would mix politics and literature in a tough but gentlemanly fashion." ... The publication has always been erudite and authoritative – and because of its analytical rigor and seriousness, frequently essential – but it hasn't always been lively, pungent and readable. ... But the election of George W. Bush, combined with the furies of 9/11, jolted the editors. Since 2001, the Review's temperature has risen and its political outlook has sharpened. ... Prominent [writers for] the Review ... charged into battle not only against the White House but against the lethargic press corps and the "liberal hawk" intellectuals. ... In stark contrast to The New Yorker ... or The New York Times Magazine ..., the Review opposed the Iraq War in a voice that was remarkably consistent and unified.

The Review also devotes space in most issues to poetry, and has featured the work of such poets as Robert Lowell, John Berryman, Ted Hughes, John Ashbery, Richard Wilbur, Seamus Heaney, Octavio Paz, and Czesław Miłosz. For writers, the "depth [of the articles], and the quality of the people writing for it, has made a Review byline a résumé definer. If one wishes to be thought of as a certain type of writer – of heft, style and a certain gravitas – a Review byline is pretty much the gold standard." In editing a piece, Silvers said that he asked himself "if [the point in any sentence could] be clearer, while also respecting the writer's voice and tone. You have to listen carefully to the tone of the writer's prose and try to adapt to it, but only up to a point. [No change was made without the writers' permission.] ... Writers deserve the final word about their prose."

In addition to domestic matters, the Review covers issues of international concern. In the 1980s, a British commentator noted: "In the 1960s [the Review] opposed American involvement in Vietnam; more recently it has taken a line mildly Keynesian in economics, pro-Israeli but Anti-Zionist, sceptical of Reagan's Latin-American policy". The British newspaper The Independent has described the Review as "the only mainstream American publication to speak out consistently against the war in Iraq". On Middle East coverage, Silvers said, "any serious criticism of Israeli policy will be seen by some as heresy, a form of betrayal. ... [M]uch of what we've published has come from some of the most respected and brilliant Israeli writers ... Amos Elon, Avishai Margalit, David Grossman, David Shulman, among them. What emerges from them is a sense that occupying land and people year after year can only lead to a sad and bad result."

Caricaturist David Levine illustrated The New York Review of Books from 1963 to 2007, giving the paper a distinctive visual image. Levine died in 2009. John Updike, whom Levine drew many times, wrote: "Besides offering us the delight of recognition, his drawings comfort us, in an exacerbated and potentially desperate age, with the sense of a watching presence, an eye informed by an intelligence that has not panicked, a comic art ready to encapsulate the latest apparitions of publicity as well as those historical devils who haunt our unease." Levine contributed more than 3,800 pen-and-ink caricatures of famous writers, artists and politicians for the publication. Silvers said: "David combined acute political commentary with a certain kind of joke about the person. He was immensely sensitive to the smallest details – people's shoulders, their feet, their elbows. He was able to find character in these details." The New York Times described Levine's illustrations as "macro-headed, somberly expressive, astringently probing and hardly ever flattering caricatures of intellectuals and athletes, politicians and potentates" that were "replete with exaggeratedly bad haircuts, 5 o'clock shadows, ill-conceived mustaches and other grooming foibles ... to make the famous seem peculiar-looking in order to take them down a peg". In later years, illustrators for the Review included James Ferguson of Financial Times.

The Washington Post described the "lively literary disputes" conducted in the 'letters to the editor' column of the Review as "the closest thing the intellectual world has to bare-knuckle boxing". In addition to reviews, interviews and articles, the paper features extensive advertising from publishers promoting newly published books. It also includes a popular "personals" section that "share[s] a cultivated writing style" with its articles. One lonely heart, author Jane Juska, documented the 63 replies to her personal ad in the Review with a 2003 memoir, A Round-Heeled Woman, that was adapted as a play. In The Washington Post, Matt Schudel called the personal ads "sometimes laughably highbrow" and recalled that they were "spoofed by Woody Allen in the movie Annie Hall".

Several of the magazine's editorial assistants have become prominent in journalism, academia and literature, including Jean Strouse, Deborah Eisenberg, Mark Danner and A. O. Scott. Another former intern and a contributor to the Review, author Claire Messud, said: "They're incredibly generous about taking the time to go through things. So much of [business today] is about people doing things quickly, with haste. One of the first things to go out the window is a type of graciousness. ... There's a whole sort of rhythm and tone of how they deal with people. I'm sure it was always rare. But it feels incredibly precious now." Still another, Sigrid Nunez, commented of the editors: "You had these two people who were at the top of everything, who had no interest in anything except doing this amazing job. They were strangely without ego."

The Review has published, since 2009, the NYR Daily, which focuses on the news.

== Reception ==
The Washington Post calls the Review "a journal of ideas that has helped define intellectual discourse in the English-speaking world for the past four decades. ... By publishing long, thoughtful articles on politics, books and culture, [the editors] defied trends toward glibness, superficiality and the cult of celebrity". The Chicago Tribune praised the paper as "one of the few venues in American life that takes ideas seriously. And it pays readers the ultimate compliment of assuming that we do too." Esquire termed it "the most respected intellectual journal in the English language" and "the premier literary-intellectual magazine in the English language". Similarly, in a 2006 New York magazine feature, James Atlas stated: "It's an eclectic but impressive mix [of articles] that has made The New York Review of Books the premier journal of the American intellectual elite". The Atlantic commented in 2011 that the Review is written with "a freshness of perspective", and "much of it shapes our most sophisticated public discourse". In celebrating the 35th birthday of the Review in 1998, The New York Times commented, "The N.Y.R. gives off rogue intimations of being fun to put out. It hasn't lost its sneaky nip of mischief".

In 2008, Britain's The Guardian deemed the Review "scholarly without being pedantic, scrupulous without being dry". The same newspaper wrote in 2004:

The ... issues of the Review to date provide a history of the cultural life of the east coast since 1963. It manages to be ... serious with a fierce democratic edge. ... It is one of the last places in the English-speaking world that will publish long essays ... and possibly the very last to combine academic rigour – even the letters to the editor are footnoted – with great clarity of language.

In New York magazine, in February 2011, Oliver Sacks stated that the Review is "one of the great institutions of intellectual life here or anywhere". In 2012, The New York Times described the Review as "elegant, well mannered, immensely learned, a little formal at times, obsessive about clarity and factual correctness and passionately interested in human rights and the way governments violate them".

Throughout its history, the Review has been known generally as a left-liberal journal, what Tom Wolfe called "the chief theoretical organ of Radical Chic". A 1997 New York Times article, however, accused the paper of having become "establishmentarian". The paper has, perhaps, had its most effective voice in wartime. According to a 2004 feature in The Nation,

One suspects they yearn for the day when they can return to their normal publishing routine – that gentlemanly pastiche of philosophy, art, classical music, photography, German and Russian history, East European politics, literary fiction – unencumbered by political duties of a confrontational or oppositional nature. That day has not yet arrived. If and when it does, let it be said that the editors met the challenges of the post-9/11 era in a way that most other leading American publications did not, and that The New York Review of Books ... was there when we needed it most.

Sometimes accused of insularity, the Review has been called "The New York Review of Each Other's Books". Philip Nobile expressed a mordant criticism along these lines in his book Intellectual Skywriting: Literary Politics and the New York Review of Books. The Guardian characterized such accusations as "sour grapes". Phillip Lopate commented, in 2017, that Silvers "regarded his contributors as worthy authors, and so why punish them by neglecting their latest work?". In 2008, the San Francisco Chronicle wrote, "the pages of the 45th anniversary issue, in fact, reveal the actuality of [the paper's] willfully panoramic view".

The Washington Post called the 2013 50th Anniversary issue "gaudy with intellectual firepower. Four Nobel Laureates have bylines. US Supreme Court Justice Stephen Breyer muses on reading Proust. There's the transcript of a long-lost lecture by T. S. Eliot." In 2014, Rachel Cooke wrote in The Observer of a recent issue: "The offer of such an embarrassment of riches is wholly amazing in a world where print journalism increasingly operates in the most threadbare of circumstances". America magazine echoed Zoë Heller's words about the Review: "I like it because it educates me." Lopate adds that the Review "was and is the standard bearer for American intellectual life: a unique repository of thoughtful discourse, unrepentantly highbrow, in a culture increasingly given to dumbing down." Timothy Noah of Politico called it "the country's best and most influential literary journal. ... It's hard to imagine that Hardwick ... would complain today that book reviewing is too polite."

From Mary McCarthy and Edmund Wilson to Gore Vidal and Joan Didion, The New York Review of Books has consistently employed the liveliest minds in America to think about, write about, and debate books and the issues they raise."

— National Book Foundation

== Book-publishing arm ==
The book-publishing arm of the Review is New York Review Books. Established in 1999, it has several imprints: New York Review Books, NYRB Classics, The New York Review Children's Collection, New York Review Comics, NYRB Poets, NYRB Lit and the Calligrams. NYRB Collections publishes collections of articles from frequent Review contributors. The Classics imprint reissues books that have gone out of print in the US, as well as translations of classic books. It has been called "a marvellous literary imprint ... that has put hundreds of wonderful books back on our shelves."

== The Robert B. Silvers Foundation ==
The Robert B. Silvers Foundation is a charitable trust established in 2017 by a bequest of the late Robert Silvers, a founding editor of The New York Review of Books. Its annual activities include the Silvers Grants for Work in Progress, given in support of long-form non-fiction projects within the fields cultivated by Silvers as editor of the Review, and the Silvers-Dudley Prizes, awarded for notable achievements in journalism, criticism, and cultural commentary.

== Archives ==
The New York Public Library purchased the NYRB archives in 2015.

== See also ==
- The New York Times Book Review
- Media in New York City
- Granta
