= Timeline of the Plame affair =

Chronology of the CIA leak scandal

The Plame affair erupted in July 2003, when journalist Robert Novak revealed that Valerie Plame worked as covert employee of the Central Intelligence Agency, although the seeds of the scandal had been laid during 2001 and 2002 as the Bush administration investigated allegations that Iraq had purchased Nigerien uranium.

Between 2003 and 2007, Patrick Fitzgerald led a criminal investigation into allegations that the Bush administration had leaked Plame's identity as retribution against her husband, Joseph C. Wilson, who had publicly questioned the rationale for the Iraq War. In August 2006, former U.S. Deputy Secretary of State Richard Armitage revealed that he had been Novak's primary source for the leak.

By July 2007, when President George W. Bush commuted the prison sentence Scooter Libby had received for perjury and obstruction of justice during Fitzgerald's investigation of the leak, the scandal had largely come to a close. In April 2018, President Donald Trump fully pardoned Libby.

== 1980s ==
- Between 1980 and 1982 Sadam Hussein's Baathist Iraq procures more than 400 tons of yellowcake from Portugal and Niger. This material remains in Iraq under IAEA monitoring until the 2003 invasion.

=== 1981 ===
- Seyni Kountché, then President of Niger, stated that his country would "sell uranium even to the devil."

=== 1988 ===
- A BBC report notes that South Africa illicitly sells Uranium to Iraq through Uday Hussein. This sale is unverified by other sources.

== 1990s ==
=== 1990 ===
- Valerie Plame begins her first CIA posting, posing as a State Department official at the US embassy in Athens.

=== 1991 ===
- The Persian Gulf War ends with Iraq being forced to concede to the demands of the United Nations after a coalition led by the United States forces directed by GHW Bush's Pentagon where Colin Powell heads army via Gen Norman Schwartzkopf expels Iraqi Baathist armies of Saddam Hussein from burning oil fields of Kuwait.

=== 1993 ===
- According to an editorial in National Review Online, an IAEA report lists 580 tons of natural uranium in Iraqi stockpiles, some of which came from Niger.

=== 1994 ===
- May 22, 1994: Brewster Jennings & Associates, a front company for the Central Intelligence Agency posing as a "legal services office," is registered with Dun and Bradstreet. Brewster Jennings & Associates will be a cover for many CIA officers, including Valerie Plame.

=== 1997 ===
- Fearing that Aldrich Ames has revealed her identity to Russian intelligence, the CIA recalls Plame from Europe to Washington.

=== 1999 ===
- June: (According to a 2002 conversation between Joseph C. Wilson and former Prime Minister of Niger Ibrahim Assane Mayaki) An Iraqi businessman approached Mayaki and insisted that Mayaki meet with an Iraqi delegation to discuss "expanding commercial relations" between the Iraqi government of Saddam Hussein and Niger. Mayaki interpreted the overture as an attempt to discuss uranium sales, but steered the conversation away from trade because of UN sanctions against Iraq. In a 2004 conversation with Wilson, Wilson's "Nigerien source" (presumably, Mayaki), told Wilson that the "Iraqi businessman" he had met in June 1999 was Muhammed Saeed al-Sahaf, the former Iraqi Information Minister, sometimes referred to in the U.S. press as "Baghdad Bob."

== 2001 ==
- Summer-Autumn 2001: Marc Grossman, the recently appointed Under Secretary of State for Political Affairs, allegedly warns Turkish members of a nuclear smuggling ring connected to the proliferation network of Dr. Abdul Qadeer Khan about Brewster Jennings & Associates' role as a Central Intelligence Agency front.
- New Years 2001: Over the holiday, a gang of burglars break into the embassy of Niger in Rome and steal some letterhead and official stamps.

== 2002 ==
=== February 2002 ===
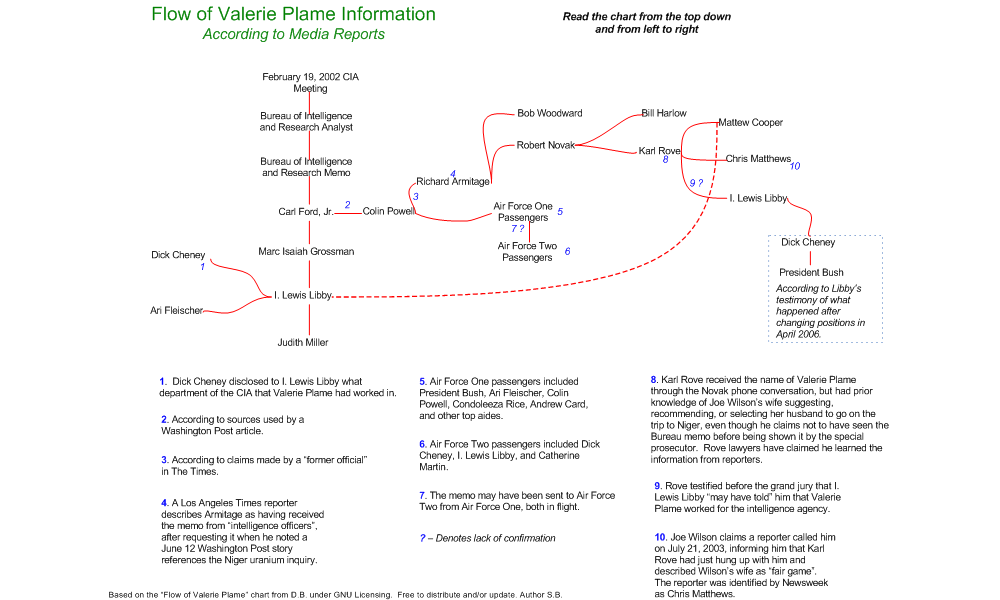
Flow of Valerie Plame Information according to media reports

- 12 February: Vice President Cheney reads a DIA report on alleged Niger-Iraq uranium sale and asks for the CIA's analysis.
- 12 February: Valerie Plame, a C.I.A. employee working in its Counterproliferation Division, sends a memo to the deputy chief of the C.I.A.'s Directorate of Operations stating that her husband has good contact with the former Prime Minister and Director of Mines in Niger as well as other contacts who might prove useful in shedding light on the supposed Niger-Iraq uranium contract.
- 13 February: An operations official cables an overseas officer seeking approval of Joe Wilson investigation
- 19 February: CIA staffers, including Plame, meet to discuss sending Wilson to Niger. According to Plame, she is there only for a few minutes.
- 26 February 2002: Joseph C. Wilson travels to Niger at the request of the CIA. Joe Wilson meets with the former minister of mines, Mai Manga, who said he knew of no sales of uranium between Niger and rogue states. He states the mines are closely monitored from mining to transport loading making it at least very difficult if not impossible for a rogue state to obtain uranium through this channel.
  - Joe Wilson indicates that in his conversation with former Niger Prime Minister, Ibrahim Assane Mayaki, the PM indicated that he was not aware of any sales contract with Iraq but that in June 1999 he was approached by a businessman, asking that he meet with an Iraqi delegation to discuss expanding commercial relations. (Note: Niger's two largest exports are uranium and livestock). Wilson indicated he thought the meeting took place but that Mayaki, who was aware of the illegality of such activities, let the matter drop due to the sanctions on Iraq.
  - According to the report of the U.S. Senate Select Intelligence Committee, (July 2004, pages 43–46), former Prime Minister of Niger Mayaki told Wilson in Niger that Mayaki interpreted the June 1999 proposal of a businessman for "expanding commercial relations" as an offer to buy uranium yellowcake. However, this was only an interpretation. The Iraqi did not mention the word "uranium" or "yellowcake."
  - The Senate report's exact words on Mayaki's suspicions of Iraq's interest in uranium: "Mayaki said, however, that in June 1999, [A few words blacked out] businessman, approached him and insisted that Mayaki meet with an Iraqi delegation to discuss "expanding commercial relations' between Niger and Iraq. The [CIA] intelligence report [on Wilson's trip] said that Mayaki interpreted 'expanding commercial relations" to mean that the delegation wanted to discuss uranium yellowcake sales. The intelligence report also said that "although the meeting took place, Mayaki let the matter drop due to the U.N. sanctions on Iraq."
  - The United States Senate Select Committee on Intelligence faulted the C.I.A. for not fully investigating Iraqi efforts to obtain uranium from Niger, citing reports from both a foreign service and the United States Navy about uranium from Niger destined for Iraq and stored in a warehouse in Benin, a country located between Niger and Togo.

=== March 2002 ===
- 5 March: Wilson is debriefed by two C.I.A. officials at his home.

=== September 2002 ===
- 9 September 2002: According to Italian newspaper La Repubblica, the head of Italy's military intelligence agency (SISMI), Nicolò Pollari, meets secretly with Stephen Hadley, then Bush's Deputy National Security Adviser; the purpose of the meeting, as reported by La Repubblica, was to bypass a skeptical CIA and get documents purporting to detail an Iraqi attempt to purchase Niger uranium directly to the White House. Hadley and others who attended this meeting say they have little memory of the details of what was discussed, and in a press conference Hadley characterized the meeting as a "courtesy call" that lasted less than 15 minutes. According to the Italian Prime Minister's office, the meeting was between the then National Security Advisor, Condoleezza Rice, and Nicolò Pollari, in the presence of an Italian and US delegation that included Stephen Hadley.

=== October 2002 ===
- 6 October 2002: The National Security Council sent a sixth draft of a speech President Bush was to give in Cincinnati to the CIA. The draft contained the statement about Iraq "having been caught attempting to purchase up to 500 metric tons of uranium oxide. George Tenet, then head of the CIA, and other of his CIA officials, directed the text be removed from the speech as the certainty regarding the accuracy of the claim was weak.
- 7 October 2002: George W. Bush gives a speech in Cincinnati in which he, for the first time, lays out in detail the case for disarming Iraq. In that speech he asserts, "If the Iraqi regime is able to produce, buy, or steal an amount of highly enriched uranium a little larger than a single softball, it could have a nuclear weapon in less than a year." As directed the previous day by George Tenet, particularly through contact with Deputy National Security Adviser Stephen Hadley, the speech does not reference Iraq's alleged pursuit of Nigerien uranium.
- 9 October 2002: Elisabetta Burba, an Italian journalist for Panorama magazine, part of the media empire of Italian Prime Minister Silvio Berlusconi, contacts the U.S. Embassy in Rome, requesting authentication of some documents of interest that she has been offered. These documents allegedly represent a contract by Iraq to purchase uranium "yellowcake" from Niger. The owner has reportedly told Elisabetta Burba that she can review the documents but can only use them if she pays 15,000 euros. Panorama refuses to pay that amount unless they are first verified as authentic.
- 15 October 2002: The embassy in Rome faxes copies of these BP-documents to the State Department's Bureau of Nonproliferation in Washington, which in turn provided copies to the State Department's Bureau of Intelligence and Research (INR). It will be a few weeks, early January 2003, before INR analysts conclude the Burba Panorama documents are fabricated fakes.
- 16 October 2002: During an inter-agency meeting, analysts from the Defense Intelligence Agency, the U.S. Department of Energy, the National Security Agency, and the CIA all obtain copies of the BP-documents. None of the four CIA analysts in attendance remembers taking a copy, which later would show up in a CIA vault during a postmortem search.

=== December 2002 ===
- 19 December 2002: By this date the uranium claim, which George Tenet had removed from Bush's speech in Cincinnati, Ohio, in October 2002, had found its way back into a State Department "fact sheet." Following that, the Pentagon requests an authoritative judgement from the National Intelligence Council as to whether or not Iraq had sought uranium from Niger.

== 2003 ==
=== January 2003 ===
- January: The National Intelligence Council, responding to the Pentagon's request, drafts a memo addressing the Niger uranium story in which they conclude the story is baseless. The memo arrives at the White House prior to the State of the Union address given later that month.
- 6 January: The International Atomic Energy Agency (IAEA) asks the United States for any information related to the claim that Iraq had purchased yellowcake uranium from Niger.
- 13 January: The INR's nuclear analyst sends email to colleagues providing rationale on why the Yellowcake document is a hoax. The CIA's nuclear analyst does not have the BP-documents in question and requests a copy.
- 16 January: CIA received copies of the original foreign language BP-documents on the Niger-Iraq contract.
- 27 January: During a National Security Council meeting at the White House, someone hands CIA head George Tenet a hardcopy of President Bush's State of the Union address. Tenet is, he later testifies, too busy to read it and hands it to an aide who passes it to a top official in the CIA intelligence directorate who was also too busy to read it.
- 28 January: President George W. Bush gives his State of the Union speech. Toward the end Bush states, "The British government has learned that Saddam Hussein recently sought significant quantities of uranium from Africa." The sentence becomes known as the "16 words." In his State of the Union speech, Bush also declares, "The International Atomic Energy Agency confirmed in the 1990s that Saddam Hussein had an advanced nuclear weapons development program, had a design for a nuclear weapon and was working on five different methods of enriching uranium for a bomb."

=== February 2003 ===
- 4 February: The United States provides electronic copy of the BP-documents on Iraqi acquisition of Niger yellowcake to Jacques Bute, then head of IAEA's Iraq Nuclear Verification Office, who was in New York, and sends a copy to the IAEA offices in Vienna as well.

=== March 2003 ===
- 3 March: The IAEA tells the U.S. Mission in Vienna the BP-documents on Niger yellowcake were obvious fakes. Among errors reportedly identified in the documents is a reference to a Nigerien constitution in 1965.
- 20 March: Iraq invasion begins.

=== May 2003 ===
- 6 May: After an off-the-record meeting with Wilson, Nicholas Kristof reports in a New York Times column that "a former U.S. ambassador to Africa" had been sent to Niger the year before and had reported that the Iraq uranium allegations were false.

=== June 2003 ===
- 10 June: State Department staff prepare an internal memo naming Plame as Wilson's wife. The paragraph identifying Mrs. Wilson is marked "(S-NF)", signifying its information is classified "Secret, Noforn."
- 12 June: During a telephone call, Cheney told Libby that Wilson's wife worked in Counter Proliferation
- 12 June: Marc Grossman, the Undersecretary of State for Political Affairs, meets with Scooter Libby and tells him that Plame works for the CIA and may have helped organize her husband's Niger trip.

=== July 2003 ===
The "Plame affair" becomes such during this month. The month opens with Wilson's op-ed describing his trip to Niger and suggesting the Iraqi nuclear threat had been exaggerated, followed within days by multiple Bush administration leaks or confirmations to reporters and the publishing of Wilson's wife's name, revealing that Valerie Plame worked for the C.I.A. despite the fact that she was then undercover. By mid-month the first stories emerge suggesting the Bush administration had leaked this information as retribution against Wilson.

- 6 July: Wilson publishes an op-ed in The New York Times describing his trip to Niger and saying: "I have little choice but to conclude that some of the intelligence related to Iraq's nuclear weapons program was twisted to exaggerate the Iraqi threat."
- 7 July: Secretary of State Colin Powell boards Air Force One for a trip to Africa with President Bush and other members of the administration. Powell carries with him a copy of the 10 June memo his State Department prepared, naming Plame as Wilson's wife and signifying the information is classified "Secret, Noforn."
- 7 July: Over lunch, Libby tells White House Press Secretary Ari Fleischer that Wilson's wife works on nonproliferation issues at the CIA and was behind Wilson's trip to Niger.
- pre-8 July: Journalist Robert Novak has a conversation with Deputy Assistant Secretary of State Richard Armitage. In that conversation he is told for the first time that Wilson's wife works for the C.I.A., though Armitage didn't tell Novak her name. (In August 2006, Armitage publicly discloses that he believes he was the "inadvertent" leak of the Plame secret, while also asserting that he did not know her actual name at the time.) Novak checks Joseph C. Wilson's biography in Who's Who to identify his wife, finding her maiden name Valerie Plame. According to the reporters Michael Isikoff and David Corn, Armitage's leak was "inadvertent, and the Intelligence Identities Act hadn't been violated."
- 8 July: Robert Novak has a phone conversation with Karl Rove, Senior Advisor to the President of the United States, in which C.I.A. agent Plame is discussed, according to an unnamed source who had been told not to talk about the case. Novak is reported to have told Rove the name of the agent as "Valerie Plame" and her role in Wilson's mission to Africa. Rove is reported to have told Novak something to the effect of, "I heard that, too." or "Oh, so you already know about it." Rove reportedly told the grand jury that at this time he had already heard about Wilson's wife working for the CIA from another journalist, but is unable to remember who that was.
- 8 July: Lewis Libby meets with journalist Judith Miller and tells her that the Niger uranium claim had been a "key judgement" of the October 2002 National Intelligence Estimate (NIE), and that Plame worked at the CIA. Libby would later state that President Bush had instructed him to disclose information from the classified NIE. The information Libby gave Miller was false; the Niger claim was not one of the "key judgements" headlined, bolded, and bulleted in the first pages of that NIE. Later, after testifying to a Federal grand jury in October 2005, Miller writes in a retrospective account published in the New York Times that on this date (and four days later, on 12 July 2003), Libby "played down the importance of Mr. Wilson's mission and questioned his performance."
- c. 10 July – 11 July: Novak called CIA spokesman Bill Harlow to confirm information regarding Plame and Wilson. According to Novak, Harlow denied that Plame "suggested" that Wilson be selected for the trip, and Harlow stated instead that CIA "counter-proliferation officials selected Wilson and asked his wife to contact him." According to Harlow, he "warned Novak in the strongest terms he was permitted to use without revealing classified information", that Wilson's wife had not authorized the mission and that if Novak did write about it, her name should not be revealed. Harlow said that after Novak's call, he checked Plame's status and confirmed that she was an undercover operative. He said he called Novak back to repeat that the story Novak had related to him was wrong and that Plame's name should not be used. According to Harlow, however, he did not tell Novak directly that Plame was undercover because that information was classified. According to Novak, not only did Harlow fail to say that Plame was undercover, he actually told Novak that "she probably never again would be given a foreign assignment but that exposure of her name might cause 'difficulties.'" Novak states that if he had been told that disclosure of Plame's name would endanger her or anyone else, he would not have disclosed the name.
- 11 July: Creators Syndicate distributes Novak's column naming Plame on the AP newswire.
- 11 July: Time reporter Matthew Cooper's internal Time e-mail message bearing the time 11:07 a.m. is sent to his bureau chief, stating: "Spoke to Rove on double super secret background for about two mins before he went on vacation. ... " Cooper writes that Rove offered him a "big warning" not to "get too far out on Wilson." According to Cooper, Rove told Cooper that Wilson's trip had not been authorized by "DCI" (CIA Director George Tenet) or Vice President Dick Cheney. Rather, "it was, KR said, Wilson's wife, who apparently works at the agency on WMD issues who authorized the trip." Rove also told Cooper that, "there's still plenty to implicate Iraqi interest in acquiring uranium fro[m] Niger". Cooper would later tell the investigating grand jury that Rove concluded the conversation by saying "I've already said too much."
- 11 July (afternoon or evening): CIA Director George Tenet takes responsibility for the misleading language concerning uranium in Bush's State of the Union Address, citing a failure of the agency's vetting process. Director Tenet also (1) clarified that Wilson had reported that a businessman had made possible overtures to acquire uranium from Niger; (2) alleged that Wilson's report did not mention forged documents or even mention the existence of documents; and (3) discussed the October 2002 National Intelligence Estimate conclusions regarding Iraq's nuclear program. According to a 2005 article in The New York Times, Tenet's 11 July 2003 statement was written by Karl Rove and Scooter Libby.
- 12 July: President Bush and his team are still on their Africa visit. White House Press Secretary Fleischer discusses the uranium controversy, at a "press gaggle" at the National Hospital in Abuja, Nigeria, where President Bush was visiting, at 9:20 AM local time. After a brief statement on the President's activities at the hospital, Fleischer answers a question regarding the previous day's statement by CIA Director Tenet. Fleisher states that the President is pleased by the statement, and expresses the President's confidence in Tenet. The next question is one of accountability, which the press secretary deflects, saying, in part, "The greater truth is that nobody, but nobody, denies that Saddam Hussein was seeking nuclear weapons." Fleischer cites Wilson's report as being supportive of the yellowcake claim. The conversation with reporters repeated that intelligence supported the notion that Iraq had or was trying to acquire nuclear weapons. Fleischer reiterates the administration's position that the yellowcake claim should not have risen to the level of inclusion in a "presidential speech." When asked about public perception, Fleischer denies that there's a problem. "Yes, the President has moved on. And I think, frankly, much of the country has moved on, as well."
- 12 July: Journalist Judith Miller again meets with Scooter Libby. After testifying to a Federal grand jury in October 2005, she will write in the New York Times that on this occasion, as on the occasion of another conversation four days earlier, Libby "played down the importance of Mr. Wilson's mission and questioned his performance."
- 12 July: Washington Post reporter Walter Pincus says an administration official told him, somewhat off topic, that Joseph Wilson's wife was a CIA analyst working on weapons of mass destruction and that Wilson's trip was a "boondoggle."
- 14 July: "Mission to Niger" article is written by Robert Novak: "Wilson never worked for the CIA, but his wife, Valerie Plame, is an Agency operative on weapons of mass destruction. Two senior administration officials told me Wilson's wife suggested sending him to Niger ... The CIA says its counter-proliferation officials selected Wilson and asked his wife to contact him." (Italics added.) The story is published on Ari Fleischer's last day as White House Press Secretary.
- 16 July: "A White House Smear" article is written by David Corn and published at the website of Nation magazine. Corn opines that Novak's informants revealed the role of Wilson's wife in order to sully Wilson's name for the sake of revenge, "That would seem to mean that the Bush administration has screwed one of its own top-secret operatives in order to punish Wilson or to send a message to others who might challenge it." Corn's article is the first published to argue a nefarious White House role.
- 17 July: "A War on Wilson?" article is written by Matthew Cooper, Massimo Calabresi and John F. Dickerson, and published in Time. Their article indicates that some of the sources for "A Question of Trust" had informed at least one of them about Valerie Plame's status. They trace the controversy surrounding President Bush's 28 January 2003 State of the Union speech and the African uranium controversy. Anonymous sources of information are attributed to "two senior Administration officials", "another official", and "an intelligence official". Named sources include Vice President Dick Cheney's assistant Scooter Libby, Joseph Wilson, Valerie Plame's superior Alan Foley, and former State Department proliferation expert Greg Thielmann.
- 18 July: Undersecretary of State John R. Bolton is questioned by the State Department Inspector General regarding sources for the Niger uranium claims.
- 21 July: Newsday article "Columnist Names CIA Iraq Operative" by Timothy M. Phelps and Knut Royce attributes intelligence information independently leaked to them about Plame as coming from "intelligence officials" and a "senior intelligence official." Both authors were later subpoenaed during the criminal investigation.
- 22 July: Newsday quotes Novak regarding his use of Plame's name: "I didn't dig it out. It was given to me. They thought it was significant. They gave me the name, and I used it."
- 30 July: When pressed, newly appointed White House Press Secretary Scott McClellan tells reporters: "I'm saying no one was certainly given any authority to do anything of that nature, and I've seen no evidence to suggest there's any truth to it."

=== August 2003 ===
- 3 August: On CNN Late Night with Wolf Blitzer, Wilson expresses confidence that American forces will find evidence of weapons of mass destruction programs in Iraq: "I think we'll find chemical weapons. I think we'll find biological precursors that may or may not have been weaponized. And I think we will find a continuing interest of — on nuclear weapons. The question really is whether it met the threshold test of imminent threat to our own national security or even the test of grave and gathering danger."
- 21 August: Wilson participated in a "public panel in Washington" and is quoted as having said "At the end of the day, it's of keen interest to me to see whether or not we can get Karl Rove frog-marched out of the White House in handcuffs. And trust me. When I use that name, I measure my words."

=== September 2003 ===
- 16 September: Scott McClellan says "it's totally ridiculous" to say Karl Rove was the Plame leaker.
- 26 September: Tenet, the director of the CIA, requests that the Justice Department open an investigation into the leak.
- 29 September: McClellan says that Karl Rove has personally assured him that he was not involved and that anyone found to have leaked classified information would be fired.
- 29 September: Novak insists that he stumbled on the story himself. "'Nobody in the Bush administration called me to leak this,' Novak said on CNN, saying the information was disclosed to him while he was interviewing a senior Bush administration official. ... Novak said the administration official told him in July that Wilson's trip was 'inspired by his wife,' and that the CIA confirmed her 'involvement in the mission for her husband.' ... 'They asked me not to use her name, but never indicated it would endanger her or anybody else,' he said, adding that a source at the CIA told him Plame was 'an analyst — not a covert operator and not in charge of undercover operators.'"
- 29 September: ABC reporter asks "Did you have any knowledge or did you leak the name of the CIA agent to the press?" Rove answers "No."
- 29 September: In an article in the National Review, Clifford May claims that Novak's column mentioning Plame "wasn't news to me. I had been told that [Plame worked for the CIA]— but not by anyone working in the White House. Rather, I learned it from someone who formerly worked in the government and he mentioned it in an offhand manner, leading me to infer it was something that insiders were well aware of."
- 29 September: The Justice Department officially launches a criminal investigation of the leak, while leading Democrats call on Attorney General Ashcroft to appoint a special prosecutor. The Justice Department informs White House counsel Alberto Gonzales around 8pm. Gonzales immediately informs White House Chief of Staff Andrew Card but waits until the next morning to notify the White House staff and to order them to preserve all relevant documents.
- 30 September: While on Hardball with Chris Matthews, Republican National Committee Chairman Ed Gillespie agrees that, if true, the leak allegations would worse than Watergate: "I think if the allegation is true, to reveal the identity of an undercover CIA operative — it's abhorrent, and it should be a crime, and it is a crime."
- 30 September: During a press conference, President Bush states: "If there's a leak out of my administration, I want to know who it is. And if the person has violated law, the person will be taken care of," but declines to appoint a special prosecutor.

=== October 2003 ===
- 1 October: In a column, Robert Novak writes that he learned Plame's identity from "an offhand revelation from [a senior administration official], who is no partisan gunslinger." After reading the column and realizing that he was that source, Richard Armitage informs Colin Powell and meets with FBI investigators.
- 1 October: Wilson told Ted Koppel on Nightline that "Washington reporters told him that senior White House adviser Karl Rove said his wife was 'fair game'." Wilson "plans to give the names of the reporters to the FBI, which is conducting a full-blown investigation of the possible leak."
- 6 October: President Bush calls the leak a "criminal action".
- 10 October: White House press secretary Scott McClellan says that Rove, national security aide Elliott Abrams, and vice presidential chief of staff Lewis Libby have "assured me they were not involved in this."

=== December 2003 ===
- 30 December: Attorney General John Ashcroft recuses himself from the investigation, appointing federal prosecutor Patrick Fitzgerald to take over as special prosecutor.
- December 2003 or January 2004: Rove's lawyer Robert Luskin says Rove has signed a waiver authorizing prosecutors to speak to any reporters Rove had talked to.

== 2004 ==
=== February 2004 ===
- 11 February: George W. Bush says: "If there's a leak out of my administration, I want to know who it is ... If the person has violated law, that person will be taken care of. I welcome the investigation. I am absolutely confident the Justice Department will do a good job. I want to know the truth ... Leaks of classified information are bad things."

=== May 2004 ===
- 22 May: The grand jury issues subpoenas to NBC News's Tim Russert and Time's Matthew Cooper. NBC and Time say they will challenge the subpoenas in court.

=== June 2004 ===
- 10 June: Asked by a reporter "do you stand by your pledge to fire anyone found to have ... leaked [Valerie Plame's] name?", Bush responds: "Yes. And that's up to the U.S. Attorney to find the facts."
- 24 June: Fitzgerald, the special prosecutor, conducts an hour-long interview with President George W. Bush.

=== July 2004 ===
- 5 July 2004: European intelligence officers claim that three years before the fake Niger-Iraq documents became public, sources from a number of countries including both human and electronic picked up repeated conversations regarding illicit trade in uranium in Niger. One of the customers for the uranium discussed was Iraq. At least three European intelligence were aware of potential illegal trade in Nigerien uranium between 1999 and 2001.
- 7 July 2004: The Senate Select Committee on Intelligence releases its "Report on the U.S. Intelligence Community's Prewar Intelligence Assessments on Iraq." The report documents and offers some explanations as to the many failures of the U.S. intelligence community in its estimates of Iraqi weapons programs. About Plame and Wilson and the Niger trip, one CIA official said Plame "offered up his name" and Plame had written a memo recommending Wilson for the trip given his connections to Nigerien officials and "lots of French contacts." (page 39) Vanity Fair's January 2004 article "Double Exposure" states Wilson was representing a concern seeking business related to gold mining in Niger, a former French colony. As for the information Wilson gained in Niger, CIA and State Department intelligence officials believed Wilson's report actually boosted the case that Iraq was seeking uranium, but Joe Wilson appeared to spin his story the opposite way. CIA continued to mention, with the backing of British Intelligence, that Iraq have sought uranium in Niger.
- 31 July 2004: Rove says on CNN "Well, I'll repeat what I said to ABC News when this whole thing broke some number of months ago. I didn't know her name and didn't leak her name." On ABC, he had actually denied having any knowledge of the Plame leak.

=== September 2004 ===
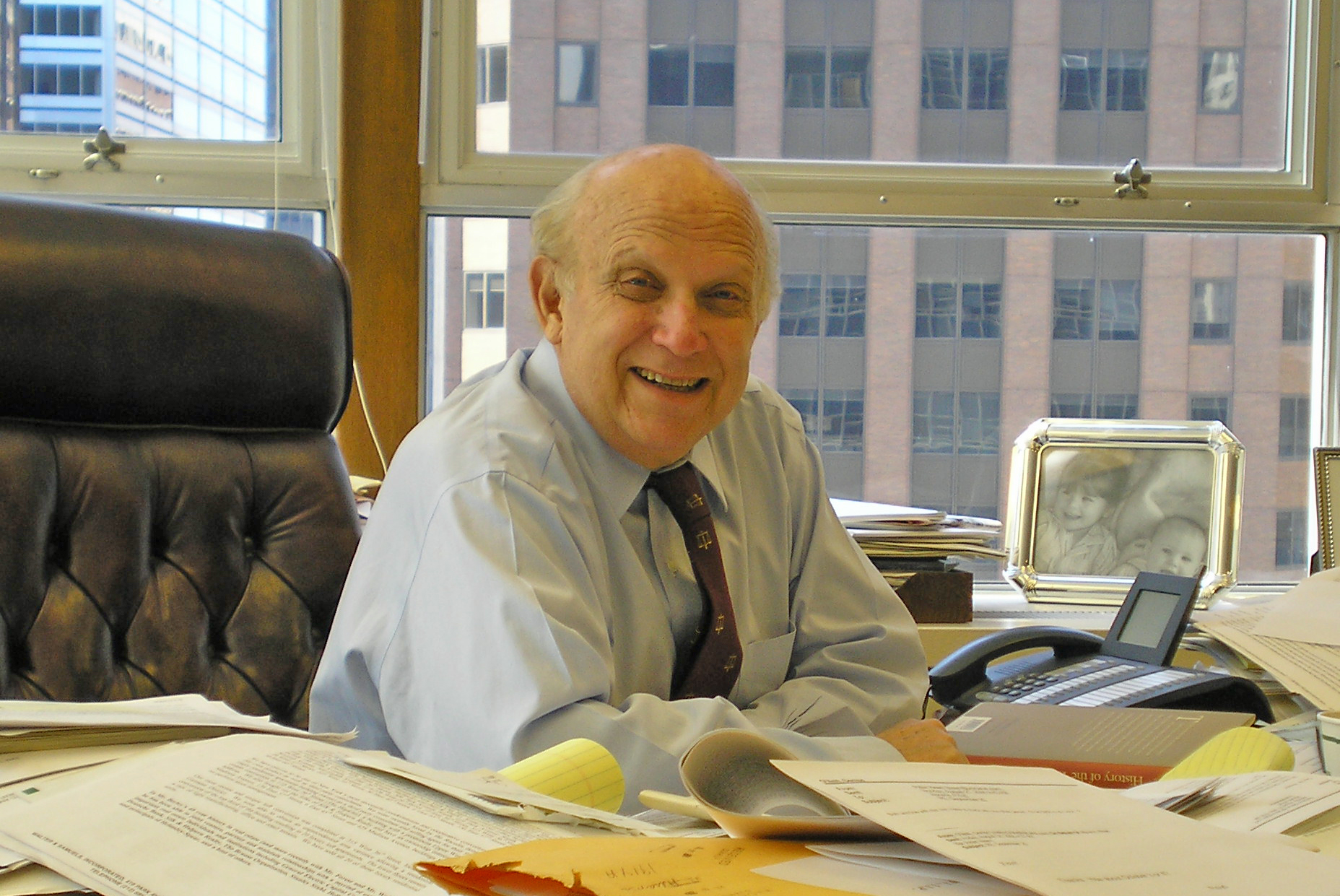
Floyd Abrams represented Judith Miller

- 16 September 2004: The Washington Post reports that a source for Walter Pincus has revealed his own identity, letting Pincus off the hook that was still ensnaring Judith Miller and Matthew Cooper.
- 30 September 2004: The Iraq Survey Group's final report is released. It concludes that there was no evidence that Iraq had attempted to acquire uranium since 1991.

=== October 2004 ===
- October 2004: Rove testifies before a grand jury investigating the leak of Plame's identity. Rove spent more than two hours testifying before the panel.

== 2005 ==
=== February 2005 ===
- 15 February 2005: Citing the Supreme Court's decision in Branzburg v. Hayes, the DC Circuit Court of Appeals rules that the First Amendment does not exempt Judith Miller and Matthew Cooper from the duty to comply with the grand jury's subpoenas.

=== March 2005 ===
- 23 March 2005: Thirty-six news organizations file a friend of the court brief on behalf of Judith Miller and Matthew Cooper. Among those organizations filing are The New York Times, The Washington Post, ABC, NBC, CBS, CNN, AP, Newsweek, Reuters, and White House correspondents, among many others. It was the general position of these news organizations and their reporters that neither Miller nor Cooper should be held in contempt of court for refusing to testify if no crime had been committed (i.e., no covert agent was "outed" in violation of the relevant statutes).

As evidence that it is likely that no crime had been committed, the news agencies voluntarily filed a friend of the court brief in which they state on page 5:

B. There is Ample Evidence On The Public Record To Cast Considerable Doubt That a Crime Has Been Committed. [Supporting facts and rationale are offered in subsequent pages.]

According to the news agencies, there was no need to compel these reporters to divulge their sources because it was unlikely that a crime had been committed.

=== June 2005 ===
- 27 June: The Supreme Court declines to hear Miller and Cooper's appeal of the February circuit court ruling.
- 30 June: Norman Pearlstine, Time Inc.'s editor in chief agrees to provide documents concerning the confidential sources of Matthew Cooper to a grand jury.

=== July 2005 ===
- July 2005: Michael Isikoff reports in Newsweek that Karl Rove spoke with Matt Cooper days before the Novak story, and that it was Cooper who initiated the call and brought up Wilson and his wife. Cooper later tells GJ that the call had nothing to do with Welfare.
- 1 July: Lawrence O'Donnell, senior MSNBC political analyst on The McLaughlin Group, stated: "And I know I'm going to get pulled into the grand jury for saying this but the source of ... for Matt Cooper was Karl Rove, and that will be revealed in this document dump that Time magazine's going to do with the grand jury."
- 4 July: Rove's lawyer, Robert Luskin, admits to Newsweek that Rove did talk to reporters about Wilson's wife before Novak's story, but without knowing her name, in line with his assertion that he only spoke to reporters about her name after Plame's identity was revealed.
- 6 July: New York Times reporter Judith Miller goes to jail to protect the identity of the persons who leaked the identity of a CIA agent.
- 6 July: Rove's lawyer, Robert Luskin, told Newsweek that Rove "did not call Cooper" to give permission to Cooper to testify.
- 7 July: The New York Times reports that Cooper's release to testify resulted from negotiations involving Rove's and Cooper's attorneys.
- 10 July: Newsweek quotes Rove lawyer Robert Luskin as confirming that Rove was the source who gave information to Time reporter Matt Cooper under a pledge of confidentiality, and that he subsequently released him to testify about that conversation to a grand jury.
- 11 July: Rove's lawyer says, "Rove did not mention her name to Cooper."
- 11 July: Cooper did not actually get a call from his "source" Rove. Read a WSJ interview by Rove Attorney Luskin and decided to testify.
- 11 July: White House spokesman McClellan declines to repeat categorical denials of Rove's involvement in the leak and to state whether Bush still pledges to fire anyone found to have leaked.
- 13 July: Matt Cooper confirmed that his source on the leak was President Bush's Deputy Chief of Staff Karl Rove after receiving a waiver from confidentiality signed by Rove's attorney, Robert Luskin.
- 17 July: In an ABC News poll, a plurality (47%) of people surveyed said the White House was not cooperating fully with the ongoing investigation; the remainder either had no opinion (28%) or thought the White House was fully cooperating (25%).
- 18 July: President Bush states that "[i]f someone committed a crime, they will no longer work in my administration." Some interpreted this as a retraction of earlier promises to fire anyone involved in the leak.
- 20 July 2005: Robert Muller, the director of the F.B.I., wrote a letter (classified) that praised Italy's cooperation with the bureau in working to determine the source of the forged Niger-Iraq document. The F.B.I. concluded from their investigation that the documents were forged for personal profit and exonerated the Italian service from intending to influence American policy. As a result, the F.B.I. had finished its investigation into the origin of the document.
- 22 July: The Senate Democratic Policy Committee holds unofficial hearings on the Plame affair.
- 25 July: In a Gallup poll, 49% of respondents believe Rove should resign.
- 26 July: John Kerry and twenty-five other Democratic senators call for congressional investigations into the leak.

=== August 2005 ===
- 8 August: In a poll commissioned by Newsweek, 45% believed Rove "guilty of a serious offence", 15% "not guilty of a serious offence", and 37% responded "don't know."

=== September 2005 ===
- 29 September 2005: Judith Miller released from jail after she agrees to testify.
- 30 September 2005: Judith Miller testifies for grand jury investigating Plame CIA leak.

=== October 2005 ===
- 13 October 2005: Judith Miller testifies for the grand jury investigating the Plame CIA leak.
- 14 October 2005: Karl Rove appears in front of the federal grand jury investigating the CIA leak. This is his fourth appearance.
- 28 October 2005: Scooter Libby is indicted on two counts of perjury, two counts of making false statements and one count of obstruction of justice. He immediately resigns as Dick Cheney's chief of staff. The grand jury which issued the indictment disbands.

=== November 2005 ===
- 4 November 2005: Gen. Nicolò Pollari, Italy's chief of Military Intelligence, told an Italian parliamentary committee on secret services that Rocco Martino, a former intelligence agency informer, was the source of the forged Niger-Iraq document. He did not, however, go so far as to say that Martino was the forger. News reports have stated that Martino claimed to have gotten the documents from a contact at the Niger embassy in Rome. Pollari is also quoted as telling the committee that no Italian intelligence officers were involved in the forgery or distribution of the document. Pollari also told the committee that Martino claimed he was working for the French intelligence service. A French intelligence spokesman called Martino's claims scandalous without going so far as to explicitly confirm or deny the essence of Martino's claim. La Repubblica, in a series of articles a week earlier, claimed that Martino had "produced the forgeries from letterhead and stamps he purloined from Niger's embassy in Rome in 2000."

== 2006 ==
=== February 2006 ===
- 4 February 2006: The Washington Post reports "... court records show that Libby denied to a grand jury that he ever mentioned Plame or her CIA job to then-White House press secretary Ari Fleischer or then-New York Times reporter Judith Miller in separate conversations he had with each of them in early July 2003. The records also suggest that Libby did not disclose to investigators that he first spoke to Miller about Plame in June 2003, and that prosecutors learned of the nature of the conversation only when Miller finally testified late in the fall of 2005." The article continues, "All three specific allegations are contained in previously redacted sections of a U.S. Court of Appeals opinion that were released yesterday. The opinion analyzed Fitzgerald's secret evidence to determine whether his case warranted ordering reporters to testify about their confidential conversations with sources."

=== June 2006 ===
- 12 June 2006: Special Counsel Fitzgerald notifies Karl Rove that he will not be indicted.

=== July 2006 ===
- 12 July: Robert Novak publicly states that Karl Rove was not his "primary source" of the information that Joseph C. Wilson's wife worked for the CIA.
- 13 July: In a lawsuit filed in U.S. District Court, Valerie Plame and her husband, Joseph C. Wilson, a former U.S. ambassador, accused Cheney, Rove and I. Lewis "Scooter" Libby of revealing Plame's CIA identity in seeking revenge against Wilson for criticizing the Bush administration's motives in Iraq.

=== August 2006 ===
- 29 August: Richard L. Armitage, a former deputy secretary of state, acknowledges that he was Robert Novak's primary source for Valerie Plame's CIA affiliation.

=== September 2006 ===
- 13 September: The Wilsons' civil action, which initially named Karl Rove, Dick Cheney, and Scooter Libby, is amended to include Armitage.
- 14 September: Robert Novak publicly disputes details of Armitage's disclosures provided in interviews and news reports.

== 2007 ==
=== March 2007 ===
- 6 March: Scooter Libby is convicted on four of five counts.
- 16 March: The House Committee on Oversight and Government Reform holds a hearing on the leak. Plame and four other witnesses testify.

=== June 2007 ===
- 5 June: Judge Reggie Walton sentences Libby to serve two and a half years in federal prison and pay a fine of $250,000.

=== July 2007 ===
- 2 July: When Libby's appeal of Walton's order fails, President Bush commutes Libby's 30-month prison sentence, leaving the other parts of his sentence intact.
- 9 July: Libby pays his monetary fine and begins serving two years of supervised release and 400 hours of community service.

== 2008 ==
- 20 March: On the recommendation of the District of Columbia Bar, the DC Circuit Court of Appeals disbars Scooter Libby until at least June 2012.

== 2016 ==
- 3 November: The District of Columbia Court of Appeals grants Libby's petition for reinstatement to the DC Bar.

== 2018 ==
- 13 April: President Donald Trump fully pardons Libby, stating that "for years, I have heard that he has been treated unfairly".
