= Brewster Jennings & Associates =

Front company by the CIA

Brewster Jennings & Associates was a front company set up in 1994 by the Central Intelligence Agency (CIA) as a cover for its officers. The most famous is Valerie Plame, a covert employee of the CIA whose then-classified status was published in a syndicated newspaper column by Robert Novak on July 14, 2003. Novak later said that his initial primary source was then-United States Deputy Secretary of State (2001–2005) Richard Armitage, though Armitage disagreed with Novak as to the extent of his role.

== Plame affair ==
According to Walter Pincus and Mike Allen, in the Washington Post of October 4, 2003, Brewster Jennings & Associates was "the obscure and possibly defunct firm" at one time listing Valerie Plame as a staff member:

Plame's name was first published July 14, 2003, in a newspaper column by Robert D. Novak that quoted two senior administration officials. They were critical of Plame's husband, former ambassador Joseph C. Wilson, IV, for his handling of a CIA mission that undercut President Bush's claim that Iraq had sought uranium from the African nation of Niger for possible use in developing nuclear weapons.... The name of the CIA front company was broadcast yesterday [October 3, 2003, on CNN] by Novak, the syndicated journalist who originally identified Plame. Novak, highlighting Wilson's ties to Democrats, said on CNN that Wilson's "wife, the CIA employee, gave $1,000 to Gore, and she listed herself as an employee of Brewster-Jennings & Associates."

Whereas, in his appearance on CNN on October 3, 2003, Novak insisted, as quoted by Pincus and Allen the next day: "There is no such firm, I'm convinced. CIA people are not supposed to list themselves with fictitious firms if they're under a deep cover – they're supposed to be real firms, or so I'm told. Sort of adds to the little mystery," the Washington Post reporters disputed Novak's conviction:

In fact, it appears the firm did exist, at least on paper. The Dun & Bradstreet database of company names lists a firm that is called both Brewster Jennings & Associates and Jennings Brewster & Associates. The phone number in the listing is not in service, and the property manager at the address listed said there is no such company at the property, although records from 2000 were not available.

Pincus and Allen explain also that:

The company's identity, Brewster Jennings & Associates, became public because it appeared in Federal Election Commission records on a form filled out in 1999 by Valerie Plame, the case officer at the center of the controversy, when she contributed $1,000 to Al Gore's presidential primary campaign. After the name of the company was broadcast on October 3, 2003, administration officials confirmed that it was a CIA front. They said the obscure and possibly defunct firm was listed as Plame's employer on her W-2 tax forms in 1999 when she was working undercover for the CIA.

Reiterating that the company was listed on the Dun & Bradstreet database of company names, Ross Kerber and Bryan Bender, in an article published on October 10, 2003, in The Boston Globe, observe that "Plame's exposure as an intelligence operative has become a major controversy in Washington," stating: "Former intelligence officials confirmed Plame's cover was an invention and that she used other false identities and affiliations when working overseas. 'All it was was a telephone and a post office box,' said one former intelligence official who asked not to be identified. 'When she was abroad she had a more viable cover.'"

Furthermore, reporting for the news service Knight Ridder, Warren Stroebel writes:

Compounding the damage, the front company, Brewster Jennings & Associates, the name of which has been reported previously, apparently also was used by other CIA officers whose work now could be at risk, according to Vince Cannistraro, former CIA chief of counterterrorism operations and analysis. Now, Plame's career as a covert operations officer in the CIA's Directorate of Operations is over. Those she dealt with – on business or not – may be in danger. The directorate is conducting an extensive damage assessment. And Plame's exposure may make it harder for American spies to persuade foreigners to share important secrets with them, U.S. intelligence officials said.

== D&B statements ==
A spokeswoman for Dun & Bradstreet, an operator of commercial databases, said Brewster Jennings was first entered into its records on May 22, 1994, but wouldn't discuss the source of the filing. Its records list the company, at 101 Arch Street, Boston, Massachusetts, as a "legal services office," which could mean a law firm, with annual sales of $60,000, one employee, and a chief executive identified as "Victor Brewster, Partner."

== Origin of the company name ==
The front company appears to have based its name on the late Benjamin Brewster Jennings, a president and founder of the Socony-Vacuum oil company, which would later become Mobil Oil and which then merged to become part of ExxonMobil. But the Jennings family denies any connection, said a grandson, Brewster Jennings, a real estate investor in Durango, Colorado. He said that since the firm was named as a CIA front he has heard from many friends and family members who "find tremendous humor in all this."

== Physical location ==
According to research published by Pincus and Allen, "The phone number in the Dun & Bradstreet listing is not in service and the property manager at the address listed said there is no such company at the property, although records from 2000 were not available."

101 Arch Street is a 21-story "tower finished in 1988 at the corner of Summer and Arch streets with 405,511 square feet (37673 square meters) of office space, then housing the upscale Dakota's restaurant, since succeeded by Vinalia. Many commuters pass through the building as they exit the Downtown Crossing subway station. 101 Arch was sold in 2003 to CB Richard Ellis Investors of Los Angeles for an estimated $90 million."

== Nuclear investigation ==
According to The Sunday Times and its main source Sibel Edmonds, Brewster Jennings & Associates was used by the CIA to investigate an alleged foreign intelligence ring, including Pakistan's ISI, which was attempting to recruit moles to obtain U.S. nuclear secrets. A parallel investigation was being run by the FBI. The American-Turkish Council put Brewster Jennings in contact with a number of Turkish agents involved in the ring, but who claimed to be conducting research in alternative energy sources. The Turkish agents were on the verge of hiring the firm for consultation when a senior US State Department official tipped them off, leading them to break off the relationship and warn the ISI and others of the front company. The State Department officially denies this. This official was later identified as Marc Grossman, the former Under Secretary of State for Political Affairs from 2001 to 2005, both under sworn testimony by Edmonds and by other sources.

== See also ==
- Joseph C. Wilson
- CIA leak scandal timeline
- Wilson v. Cheney
- United States v. Libby
- Valerie Plame Wilson
