= Wilson v. Libby =

2008 US District Court case

- Court: United States Court of Appeals for the District of Columbia Circuit
- Full case name: Valerie Plame Wilson and Joseph C. Wilson IV v. I. Lewis "Scooter" Libby, Jr., Karl C. Rove, Richard B. Cheney, Richard L. Armitage and John Does Nos. 1–10
- Argued: May 9, 2008
- Decided: August 12, 2008
- Citation: 535 F.3d 697

Case history
- Prior history: 1:06-cv-01258, 498 F. Supp. 2d 74 (D.D.C. 2007)
- Subsequent history: Cert. denied, 557 U.S. 919 (2009).

Court membership
- Judges sitting: David B. Sentelle, Karen L. Henderson, Judith W. Rogers

Case opinions
- Majority: Sentelle, joined by Henderson
- Concurrence: Rogers

Wilson v. Libby, 498 F. Supp. 2d 74 (D.D.C. 2007), affirmed, 535 F.3d 697 (D.C. Cir. 2008), was a civil lawsuit filed in the U.S. District Court for the District of Columbia on 13 July, 2006, by Valerie Plame and her husband, former Ambassador Joseph C. Wilson, IV, against Richard Armitage (individually) for allegedly revealing her identity and thus irresponsibly infringing upon her Constitutional rights and against Vice President of the United States Dick Cheney, Lewis Libby, Karl Rove, and the unnamed others (together) because the latter, in addition, allegedly "illegally conspired to reveal her identity." The lawsuit was ultimately dismissed.

== Parties ==
The plaintiffs in the suit are former CIA officer Valerie Plame Wilson and her husband Joseph Wilson.

The defendants in the suit are I. Lewis "Scooter" Libby, the Vice President's former Chief of Staff; Karl Rove, White House Chief of Staff to the President; Richard Armitage, former United States Deputy Secretary of State (who was added to the complaint in September 2006); and ten unnamed others. Unlike their charges against Rove, Cheney, and Libby, "claiming that they had violated her constitutional rights and discredited her by disclosing that she was an undercover CIA operative," the Wilsons sued Armitage "for violating the 'Wilsons' constitutional right to privacy, Mrs. Wilson's constitutional right to property, and for committing the tort of publication of private facts.'"

== Dismissal ==
United States District Court for the District of Columbia Judge John D. Bates dismissed the Wilsons' lawsuit on jurisdictional grounds on July 19, 2007, stating that the Wilsons had not shown that the case belonged in federal court. Bates also ruled that the court lacked jurisdiction over the claim because the couple had not yet exhausted their administrative remedies. Bates noted that "there can be no serious dispute that the act of rebutting public criticism, such as that levied by Mr. Wilson against the Bush administration's handling of prewar foreign intelligence, by speaking with members of the press is within the scope of defendants' duties as high-level Executive Branch officials," even if "the alleged means by which defendants chose to rebut Mr. Wilson's comments and attack his credibility" were "highly unsavory"; but Judge Bates also acknowledged that the lawsuit raised "important questions relating to the propriety of actions undertaken by our highest government officials."

== Appeal ==
On July 20, 2007, the Wilsons and Melanie Sloan, of Citizens for Responsibility and Ethics in Washington (CREW), which represents them, announced publicly that they had filed an appeal of the U.S. District Court's decision to dismiss their lawsuit, which was heard on May 8, 2008. On August 12, 2008, in a 2–1 decision, the three-judge panel of the United States Court of Appeals for the District of Columbia Circuit upheld the dismissal. On behalf of the Wilsons, Sloan said that CREW "is considering asking the full D.C. Circuit to review the case and an appeal to the U.S. Supreme Court." Agreeing with the Bush administration, the Obama Justice Department argues the Wilsons have no legitimate grounds to sue. On the current justice department position, Sloan, stated: "We are deeply disappointed that the Obama administration has failed to recognize the grievous harm top Bush White House officials inflicted on Joe and Valerie Wilson. The government’s position cannot be reconciled with President Obama’s oft-stated commitment to once again make government officials accountable for their actions."

On June 21, 2009, the U.S. Supreme Court refused to hear the appeal.

== See also ==
- CIA leak grand jury investigation
- CIA leak scandal timeline
- Plame affair
- United States v. Libby
