= Joseph Shepard =

American academic administrator

Joe Shepard

15th President of Western New Mexico University
- In office July 5, 2011 – January 15, 2025

Personal details
- Born: Joseph Shepard
- Education: Northern Arizona University (BS); University of North Texas (MS); Florida International University (PhD)

Joseph Shepard is an American academic administrator who served as the 15th president of Western New Mexico University. Appointed on April 27, 2011, he assumed office on July 5, 2011. Shepard established WNMU as the New Mexico Center of Excellence in Early Childhood Education; growing the WNMU Foundation assets 380% nationally recognized Masters of Social Work and MBA programs, and awarded an A+ in the science of teaching reading by the National Council on Teacher Quality. Shepard increased the student retention rate by 14% during his time in office and in his last year at Western. He initiated “Fiesta Latina” in 2017.

After a sustained media campaign about allegations of wasteful spending, Shepard resigned effective January 15, 2025. The university's board paid him the balance of his contract and negotiated a teaching position for Shepard. On October 17, 2025, an independent forensic auditor, overseen by the New Mexico State Auditor, released their report to the public which showed that there was no waste, fraud, abuse, incompetence, personal financial gain, or corruption found for Shepard or the university. The report did, however, detail improper expenditures ranging from improper procurement and excessive travel to the problematic issuance of university purchasing cards to non-employees, including Shepard's spouse, former CIA covert operations officer Valerie Plame. The audit flags expenditures totaling over $360,000 over the five year period investigated. The report also details weak internal controls, poor oversight and policy gaps that led to missing documentation, after-the-fact approvals or self-approvals of expenses and other issues, including potential violations of the Governmental Conduct Act and Open Meetings Act.

Joseph Shepard is married to Valerie Plame, a former CIA operations officer and author. Plame has faced scrutiny for her use of a university purchasing card, which state investigators alleged was a violation of university policy, as she is not a university employee.

On October 31, 2025, Shepard filed a Whistleblower/RICO legal case, claiming a conspiracy to defame and destroy his reputation in retaliation after he raised questions about a $1 million allocation in state money for a charter school located on the university campus that Senator Siah Correa Hemphill’s children attended without disclosing this potential conflict interest to her Senate colleagues.

== Education ==
Shepard earned a Bachelor of Science degree in math education from Northern Arizona University, Master of Business Administration in finance and banking from the University of North Texas, and a PhD in public administration from Florida International University.

== Career ==
Prior to being president of Western New Mexico University, Shepard worked as an administrator at Florida Gulf Coast University, where he was chief student affairs officer, chief business officer, and chief financial officer. As president of Western New Mexico University, Shepard was responsible for the university's main campus in Silver City, New Mexico and three additional satellite locations. In September 2019, Shepard's contract was extended for three years by the university's board of regents.
