= Mary Ann Akers =

American journalist

Mary Ann Akers is a top congress editor at the news website The Messenger. She was a blogger and reporter for The Washington Post, a national correspondent for NPR and a political gossip columnist for Roll Call newspaper, appearing on CNN, MSNBC, ABC News and other networks to talk about her coverage of Congress and politics. She has written for Politico, the Huffington Post and other outlets.

Her spouse is investigative journalist Michael Isikoff. They have a son, Zachary Akers Isikoff, born in 2009.
