= Hubris (Isikoff and Corn book) =

2006 book about the Iraq War by Michael Isikoff and David Corn

Hubris: The Inside Story of Spin, Scandal, and the Selling of the Iraq War
- Authors: Michael Isikoff; David Corn
- Language: English
- Publisher: Crown
- Publication date: September 8, 2006
- Publication place: United States
- Media type: Print (hardback)
- Pages: 480
- ISBN: 978-0-307-34681-0

Hubris: The Inside Story of Spin, Scandal, and the Selling of the Iraq War (2006) is an account of the behind the scenes events and decisions by principal figures of the United States government, that lead to the invasion spearheading Gulf War II in spring 2003. Throughout, the book entertains, and provides evidences for, the notion that key administration officials were set on invading Iraq and that the proffered reasons for the invasion—such as national security threats like the presence of WMD in Iraq—were pretexts rather than actual motivations for going to war.

In February 2013, an MSNBC documentary of the same name that marks the 10th anniversary of Gulf War II and hosted by Rachel Maddow, was produced. David Corn reviewed the documentary and found it "presenting new scoops and showing that the complete story of the selling of that war has yet to be told".
