= Russian Roulette (Isikoff and Corn book) =

2018 book by Michael Isikoff and David Corn

Russian Roulette: The Inside Story of Putin's War on America and the Election of Donald Trump
- Author: Michael Isikoff; David Corn
- Audio read by: Peter Ganim
- Language: English
- Publisher: Twelve
- Publication place: United States
- ISBN: 9781538728758

Russian Roulette: The Inside Story of Putin's War on America and the Election of Donald Trump is a 2018 book by journalists Michael Isikoff and David Corn. It details their findings on Russian interference in the 2016 United States elections.

== See also ==
- Bibliography of Vladimir Putin
- Bibliography of Russian history (1991–present)
