= Melanie Sloan =

American lawyer

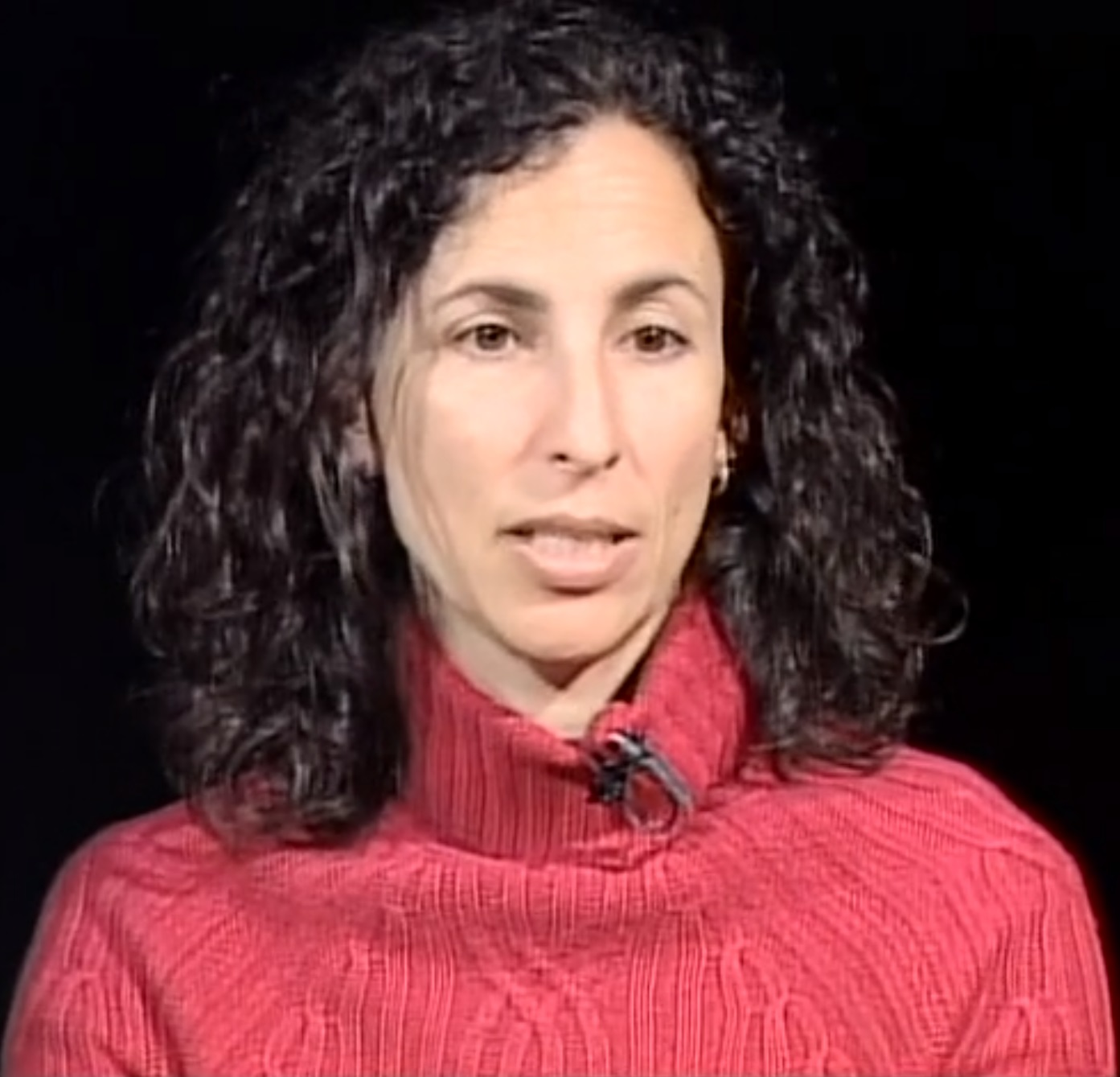
Sloan on the Government Accountability Project's "Whistleblower TV" in 2009.

Melanie Sloan (born December 16, 1965) is an American attorney, former counsel for the House Judiciary Committee, and the former executive director of Citizens for Responsibility and Ethics in Washington, a nonprofit government ethics and accountability watchdog group. In March 2017, Sloan joined a new government ethics watchdog group, American Oversight, as senior adviser.

== Early life and education ==
Sloan was born in Washington, D.C., to parents Leonard S. Togman, who then worked at the U.S. Department of Justice, and Barbara A. Togman. She grew up in Wilmington, Delaware, where she attended Wilmington Friends School. Her father, who still resides in Delaware, is a lawyer "of counsel" (retired) with the law firm Potter Anderson & Corroon LLP.

Sloan received her B.A. and J.D. from the University of Chicago.

== Career ==
Before founding Citizens for Responsibility and Ethics in Washington (CREW) in 2003, Sloan served as an Assistant United States Attorney in the District of Columbia from 1998 to 2003. Before becoming a prosecutor, Sloan served as Minority Counsel for the House Judiciary Committee, working on criminal justice issues for then-Ranking Member John Conyers (D-MI). Sloan also served as counsel for the Crime Subcommittee of the House Judiciary Committee, chaired by then-Representative Charles Schumer (D-NY). There, she drafted portions of the 1994 Crime Bill, including the Violence Against Women Act. In 1993, Sloan served as Nominations Counsel to the Senate Judiciary Committee, under then-Chairman Joseph Biden (D-DE).

Sloan has published in the Yale Law & Policy Review and other publications.

In November 2017 Sloan publicly accused Conyers of harassment and verbal abuse during her tenure working for the House Judiciary Committee. On one occasion, she was summoned to his office and found him sitting in his underwear, and quickly left.

== Media appearances ==
Sloan frequently appears on national media to provide analysis and commentary. She has appeared on shows including Pacifica Radio's Democracy Now! show, Air America's Al Franken Show, NPR's All Things Considered and Morning Edition, CNN's The Situation Room, Larry King Live and Lou Dobbs Tonight, MSNBC's Hardball, Countdown with Keith Olbermann and The Rachel Maddow Show, NBC Nightly News, CBS Evening News, and ABC World News Tonight. Sloan has been profiled in a number of publications including Ms. Magazine, Time Magazine and Mother Jones. In 2009, Sloan was featured in O Magazine's first-ever "O Power List" and was declared one of the "100 People Who Are Changing America" in Rolling Stone. She also appeared in the documentary Casino Jack and the United States of Money.

== Plame Wilson leak case ==
Sloan serves as legal counsel for former Ambassador Joseph C. Wilson and his wife, retired CIA officer Valerie Plame Wilson, whose then-classified covert identity was disclosed, leading to the CIA leak grand jury investigation and the trial of I. Lewis "Scooter" Libby in United States v. Libby (see Plame affair). Sloan is one of the attorneys representing the Wilsons in their civil lawsuit against former and current officials of the George W. Bush administration (Plame v. Cheney).

Agreeing with the Bush administration, the Obama Justice Department has argued the Wilsons have no legitimate grounds to sue. On the current Justice Department position, Sloan, stated: "We are deeply disappointed that the Obama administration has failed to recognize the grievous harm top Bush White House officials inflicted on Joe and Valerie Wilson. The government’s position cannot be reconciled with President Obama’s oft-stated commitment to once again make government officials accountable for their actions."

When Sloan was a guest on Hardball with Chris Matthews in December 2006, she spoke openly about many details in the Libby trial. Following her appearance on the show, she drew a strong warning from Judge Reggie Walton: "the Court would not tolerate this case being tried in the media."

== Student lending reform controversy ==
In October 2010, The American Prospect reporter Mike Elk raised allegations that Sloan was working in conjunction with for-profit college lobbyists to attack the credibility of student lending reform advocates. Elk alleged that while Sloan was criticizing the student lending reforms advocates, she was also talking about potential jobs with lobbyists, including Lanny Davis, who worked for the for-profit college industry. In the summer of 2010, Sloan and CREW were highly critical of famed short-seller Steve Eisman, writing letters to the congressional subcommittee, denouncing the fact that he had an adverse financial interest. CREW published a rebuttal of the article's claims, noting the ethics concern about individuals manipulating the regulatory process for personal benefit. In 2021, NPR reported that after two federal investigations, none of the allegations lodged against those individuals were proven.

== Departure from CREW ==
In the fall of 2010, Sloan announced she would be leaving CREW and joining with Lanny Davis in a legal practice. Sloan subsequently decided against joining Davis' firm and remained as the executive director of CREW. She left CREW in 2014 when David Brock became the chairman of CREW's board of directors.
