= Valerie Plame =

American writer, spy novelist and former CIA officer (born 1963)

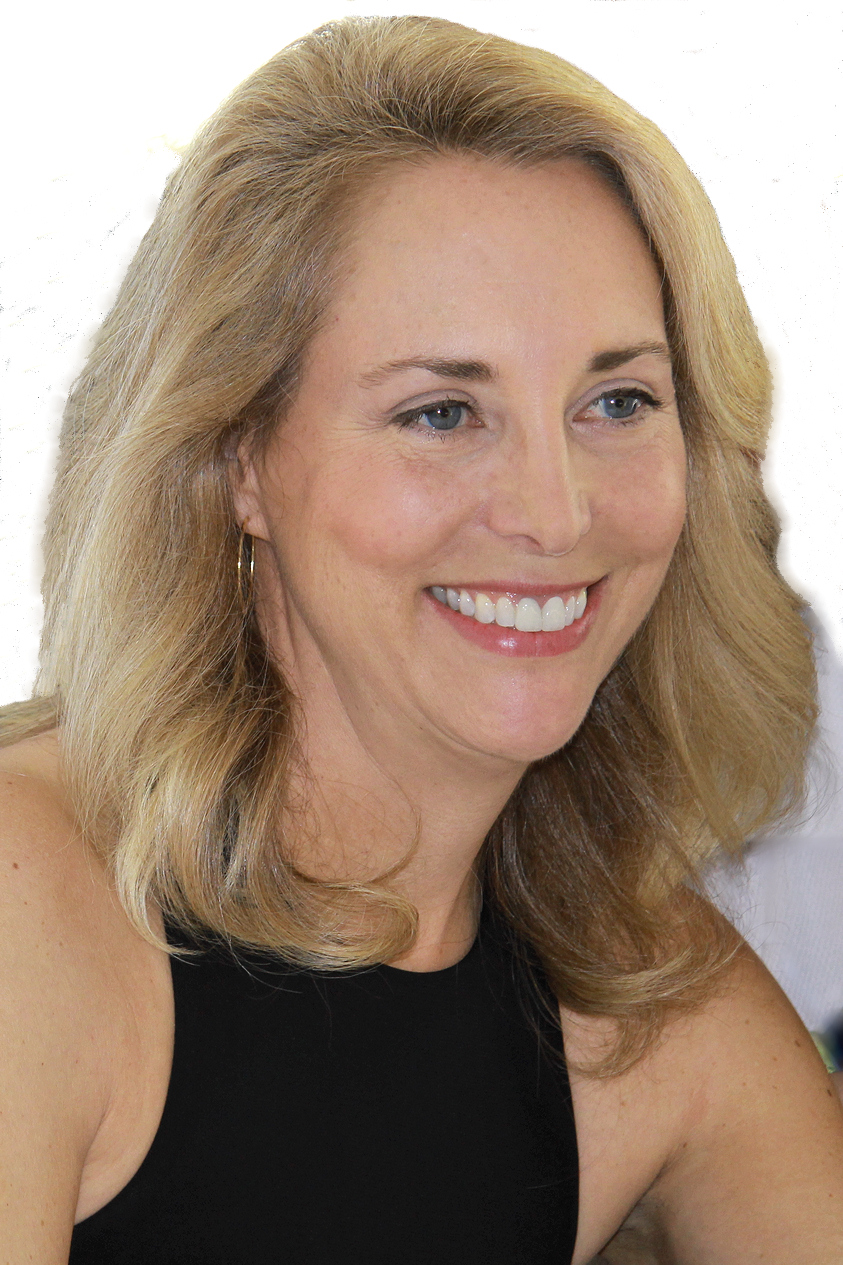
- Plame in 2014
- Born: Valerie Elise Plame; August 13, 1963 (age 63); Anchorage, Alaska, U.S.
- Other name: Valerie Plame Wilson
- Education: Pennsylvania State University (BA); London School of Economics (MSc); College of Europe (MA)
- Occupations: Spy novelist; CIA officer (1985–2006); Memoirist
- Political party: Democratic
- Spouses: Todd Sesler (m. 1987; div. 1989) Joseph C. Wilson (m. 1998; div. 2017) Joseph Shepard (m. 2020)
- Children: 2
- Website: valerieplame.com

Valerie Elise Plame (born August 13, 1963) is an American writer, novelist, and former Central Intelligence Agency (CIA) officer. As the subject of the 2003 Plame affair, also known as the CIA leak scandal, Plame's identity as a CIA officer was leaked to and subsequently published by Robert Novak of The Washington Post. She described this period and the media firestorm that ensued as "mortifying, and I think I was in shock for a couple years".

In the aftermath of the scandal, Richard Armitage in the U.S. Department of State was identified as one source of the information, and Scooter Libby, Chief of Staff to Vice President Dick Cheney, was convicted of lying to investigators. After a failed appeal, President George W. Bush commuted Libby's sentence and in 2018, President Donald Trump pardoned him. The individual responsible for leaking the information was never charged.

In collaboration with a ghostwriter, Plame wrote a memoir detailing her career and the events leading up to her resignation from the CIA. She has subsequently written and published at least two spy novels. A 2010 biographical feature film, Fair Game, was produced based on memoirs by her and her husband.

Plame was an unsuccessful candidate for New Mexico's 3rd congressional district in 2020, placing second behind Teresa Leger Fernandez in the June 2, 2020, primary.

== Early life and education ==
Valerie Elise Plame was born on August 13, 1963, on Elmendorf Air Force Base, in Anchorage, Alaska, to Diane (née McClintock) and Samuel Plame III. Plame says that her paternal grandfather was Jewish, the son of a rabbi who emigrated from Ukraine; the original family surname was "Plamevotski". The rest of Plame's family was Protestant (the religion in which Plame was raised); she was unaware, until she was an adult, that her grandfather was Jewish.

She graduated in 1981 from Lower Moreland High School, in Huntingdon Valley, Pennsylvania, and in 1985 from Pennsylvania State University, with a B.A. in advertising. While attending Penn State, she joined Pi Beta Phi sorority and worked for the business division of the Daily Collegian student newspaper.

== Career ==
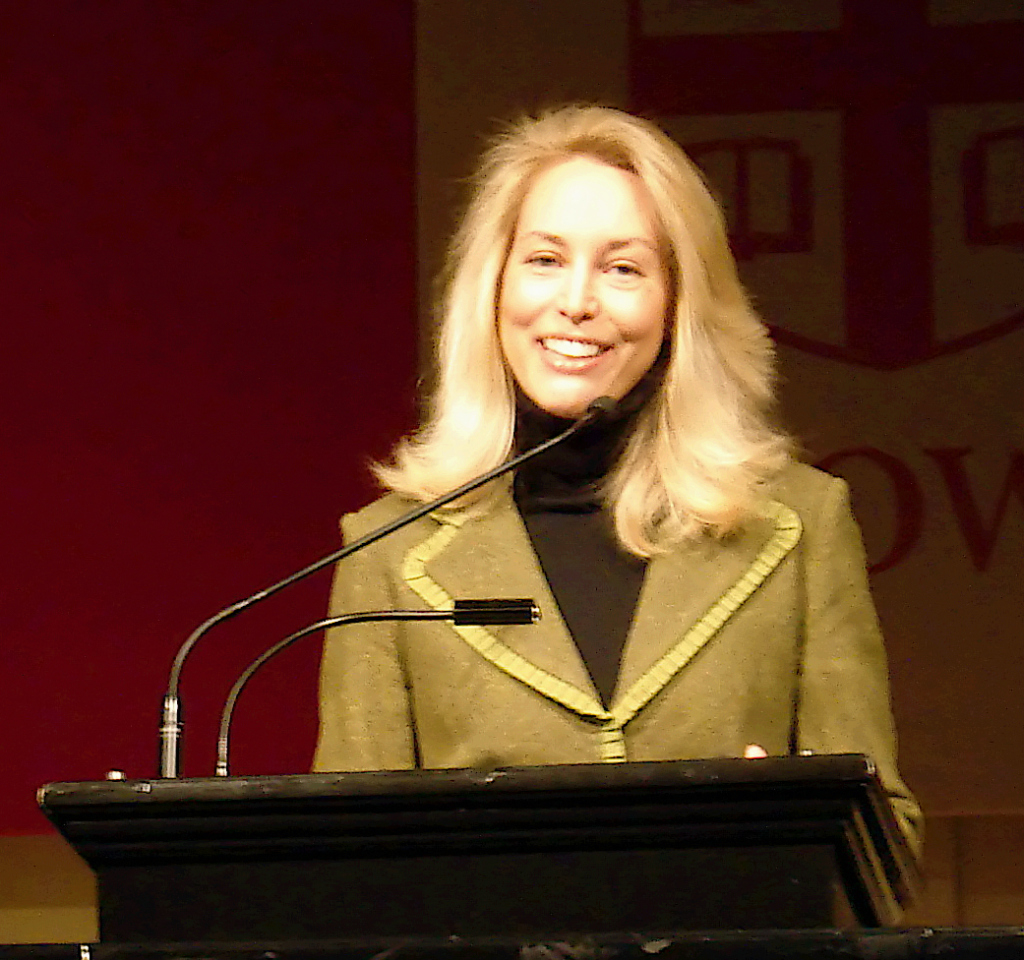
Presenting a lecture on her book Fair Game, at Brown University, in Providence, Rhode Island, on December 4, 2007

After graduating from college and moving to Washington, D.C., Plame worked at a clothing store while awaiting results of her application to the CIA. She was accepted into the 1985–86 CIA officer training class. Special Counsel Patrick Fitzgerald affirmed that Plame "was a CIA officer from January 1, 2002, forward" and that "her association with the CIA was classified at that time through July 2003." Details about Plame's professional career are still classified, but it is documented that she worked for the CIA in a non-official cover (or NOC) capacity relating to counter-proliferation.

Plame served the CIA at times as a non-official cover, operating in Athens and Brussels. While using her own name, "Valerie Plame", her assignments required posing in various professional roles in order to gather intelligence more effectively. Two of her covers include serving as a junior consular officer in the early 1990s in Athens and then later as an energy analyst for the private company (founded in 1994) "Brewster Jennings & Associates," which the CIA later acknowledged was a front company for certain investigations. A former senior diplomat in Athens remembered Plame in her dual role and also recalled that she served as one of the "control officers" coordinating the visit of President George H. W. Bush to Greece and Turkey in July 1991. The matter of whether she actually had covert status is disputed. After the Persian Gulf War in 1991, the CIA sent her first to the London School of Economics and then the College of Europe, in Bruges, for master's degrees. After earning the second degree, she stayed on in Brussels, where she began her next assignment under cover as an "energy consultant" for Brewster-Jennings. Beginning in 1997, Plame's primary assignment was shifted to the CIA headquarters in Langley, Virginia.

During this time, part of her work concerned the determination of the use of aluminum tubes purchased by Iraq. CIA analysts prior to the Iraq invasion were quoted by the White House as believing that Iraq was trying to acquire nuclear weapons and that these aluminum tubes could be used in a centrifuge for nuclear enrichment. David Corn and Michael Isikoff argued that the undercover work being done by Plame and her CIA colleagues in the Directorate of Central Intelligence Nonproliferation Center strongly contradicted such a claim.

=== "Plamegate" ===
On July 14, 2003, Robert Novak, a journalist for The Washington Post, used information obtained from Richard Armitage, Karl Rove, and Scooter Libby, to reveal Plame's identity as a CIA operative in his column. Legal documents published in the course of the CIA leak grand jury investigation, United States v. Libby, and Congressional investigations, established her classified employment as a covert officer for the CIA at the time when Novak's column was published in July 2003.

In his press conference on October 28, 2005, Special Prosecutor Patrick Fitzgerald explained the necessity of secrecy about his grand jury investigation that began in the fall of 2003—"when it was clear that Valerie Wilson's cover had been blown"—and the background and consequences of the indictment of then high-ranking Bush Administration official Scooter Libby as it pertained to her.

Fitzgerald's subsequent replies to reporters' questions shed further light on the parameters of the leak investigation and what, as its lead prosecutor, bound by the rules of grand jury secrecy, he could and could not reveal legally at the time. Official court documents released later, on April 5, 2006, reveal that Libby testified that "he was specifically authorized in advance" of his meeting with Judith Miller, reporter for The New York Times, to disclose the "key judgments" of the October 2002 classified National Intelligence Estimate (NIE). According to Libby's testimony, "the Vice President later advised him that the President had authorized defendant to disclose the relevant portions of the NIE [to Judith Miller]." According to his testimony, the information that Libby was authorized to disclose to Miller "was intended to rebut the allegations of an administration critic, former ambassador Joseph Wilson." A couple of days after Libby's meeting with Miller, then–National Security Advisor Condoleezza Rice told reporters, "We don't want to try to get into kind of selective declassification" of the NIE, adding, "We're looking at what can be made available." A "sanitized version" of the NIE in question was officially declassified on July 18, 2003, ten days after Libby's contact with Miller, and was presented at a White House background briefing on weapons of mass destruction (WMD) in Iraq. The NIE contains no references to Valerie Plame or her CIA status, but the Special Counsel has suggested that White House actions were part of "a plan to discredit, punish or seek revenge against Mr. Wilson." President Bush had previously indicated that he would fire whoever had outed Plame.

A court filing by Libby's defense team argued that Plame was not foremost in the minds of administration officials as they sought to rebut charges—made by her husband—that the White House manipulated intelligence to make a case for invasion. The filing indicated that Libby's lawyers did not intend to say that he was told to reveal Plame's identity. The court filing also stated that "Mr. Libby plans to demonstrate that the indictment is wrong when it suggests that he and other government officials viewed Ms. Wilson's role in sending her husband to Africa as important," indicating that Libby's lawyers planned to call Karl Rove to the stand. Fitzgerald ultimately decided against pressing charges against Rove.

The five-count indictment of Libby included perjury (two counts), obstruction of justice (one count), and making false statements to federal investigators (two counts). There was, however, no count for disclosing classified information, i.e., Plame's status as a CIA operative.

=== Libby trial ===
On March 6, 2007, Libby was convicted of obstruction of justice, making false statements, and two counts of perjury. He was acquitted on one count of making false statements. He was not charged for revealing Plame's CIA status. His sentence included a $250,000 fine, 30 months in prison and two years of probation. On July 2, 2007, President George W. Bush commuted Libby's sentence, removing the jail term but leaving in place the fine and probation, calling the sentence "excessive." In a subsequent press conference, on July 12, 2007, Bush noted, "...the Scooter Libby decision was, I thought, a fair and balanced decision." The Wilsons responded to the commutation in statements posted by their legal counsel, Melanie Sloan, executive director of Citizens for Responsibility and Ethics in Washington (CREW), and on their own legal support website. President Donald Trump pardoned Libby on April 13, 2018.

=== Wilson v. Cheney ===
On July 13, 2006, Joseph and Valerie Wilson filed a civil lawsuit against Rove, Libby, Vice President Dick Cheney, and other unnamed senior White House officials (to whom they later added Richard Armitage) for their alleged role in the public disclosure of Valerie Wilson's classified CIA status. Judge John D. Bates dismissed the Wilsons' lawsuit on jurisdictional grounds on July 19, 2007; the Wilsons appealed. On August 12, 2008, in a 2-1 decision, the three-judge panel of the United States Court of Appeals for the District of Columbia Circuit upheld the dismissal. Melanie Sloan, of Citizens for Responsibility and Ethics in Washington, which represents the Wilsons, said "the group will request the full D.C. Circuit to review the case and appeal to the U.S. Supreme Court." Agreeing with the Bush administration, the Obama Justice Department argued the Wilsons have no legitimate grounds to sue. On the current justice department position, Sloan stated: "We are deeply disappointed that the Obama administration has failed to recognize the grievous harm that Bush White House officials inflicted on Joe and Valerie Wilson. The government's position cannot be reconciled with President Obama's oft-stated commitment to once again make government officials accountable for their actions."

On June 21, 2009, the U.S. Supreme Court refused to hear the appeal.

=== House Oversight Committee hearing ===
On March 8, 2007, two days after the verdict in the Libby trial, Congressman Henry Waxman, chair of the United States House Committee on Oversight and Government Reform, announced that his committee would ask Plame to testify on March 16, in an effort by his committee to look into "whether White House officials followed appropriate procedures for safeguarding Plame's identity."

On March 16, 2007, at these hearings about the disclosure, Waxman read a statement about Plame's CIA career that had been cleared by CIA director Gen. Michael V. Hayden and the CIA, stating that she was undercover and that her employment status with the CIA was classified information prohibited from disclosure under Executive Order 12958.

Subsequent reports in various news accounts focused on the following parts of her testimony:

- "My name and identity were carelessly and recklessly abused by senior government officials in the White House and state department"; this abuse occurred for "purely political reasons."
- After her identity was exposed by officials in the Bush administration, she had to leave the CIA: "I could no longer perform the work for which I had been highly trained."
- She did not select her husband for a CIA fact-finding trip to Niger, but an officer senior to her selected him and told her to ask her husband if he would consider it: "I did not recommend him. I did not suggest him. There was no nepotism involved. I did not have the authority [...]."

=== Fair Game ===
Plame's husband Joseph Wilson announced on March 6, 2007, that the couple had "signed a deal with Warner Bros of Hollywood to offer their consulting services—or maybe more—in the making of the forthcoming movie about the Libby trial," their lives and the CIA leak scandal. The feature film, a co-production between Weed Road's Akiva Goldsman and Jerry and Janet Zucker of Zucker Productions with a screenplay by Jez and John-Henry Butterworth to be based in part on Valerie Wilson's memoir Fair Game (contingent on CIA clearances) originally scheduled for release in August 2007, but ultimately published on October 22, 2007.

In May 2006, The New York Times reported that Valerie Wilson agreed to a $2.5 million book deal with Crown Publishing Group, a division of Random House. Steve Ross, senior vice president and publisher of Crown, told the Times that the book would be her "first airing of her actual role in the American intelligence community, as well as the prominence of her role in the lead-up to the war." Subsequently, the New York Times reported that the book deal fell through and that Plame was in exclusive negotiations with Simon & Schuster. Ultimately, Simon and Schuster publicly confirmed the book deal, though not the financial terms and, at first, no set publication date.

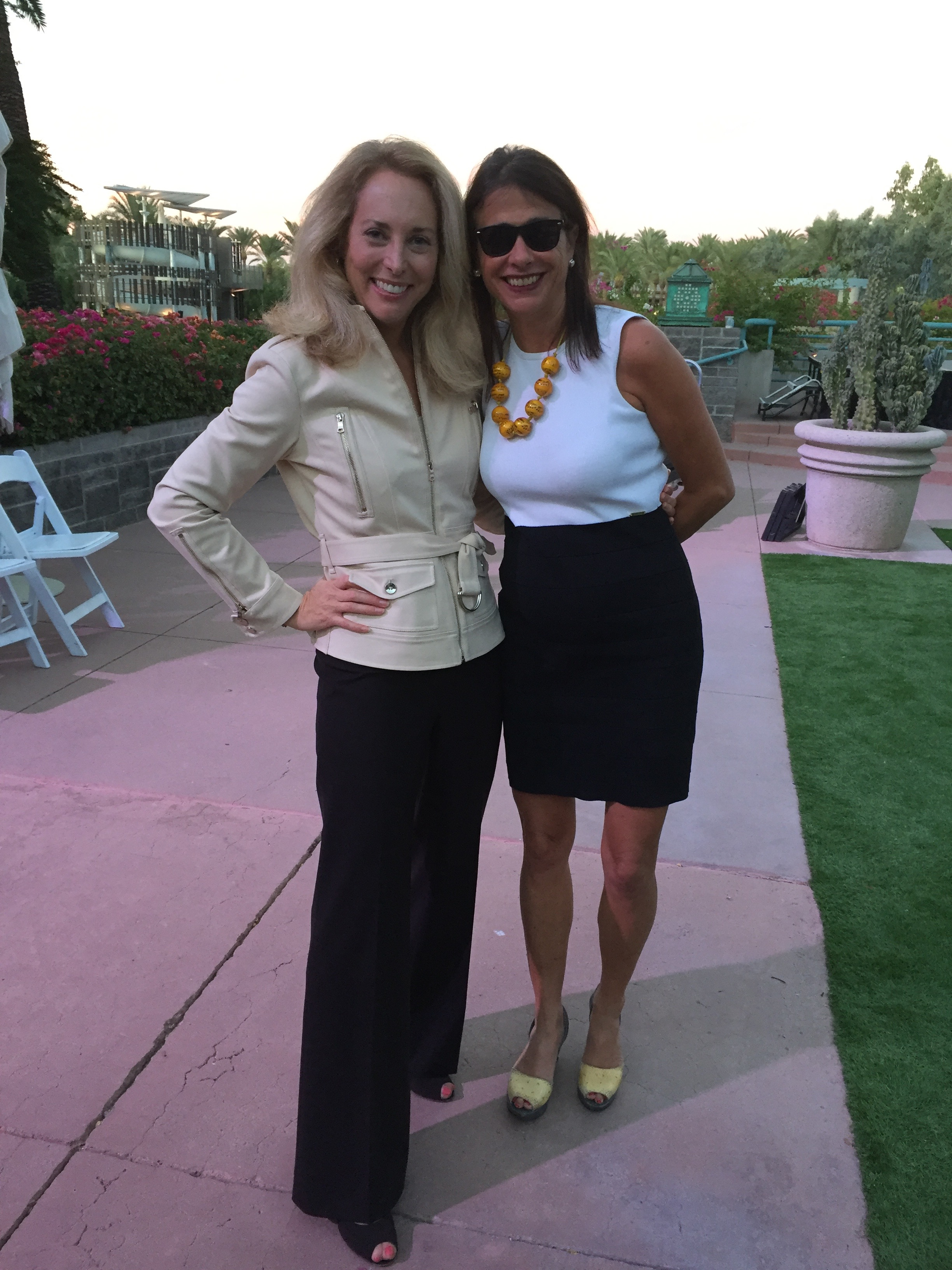
Valerie Plame and journalist Nina Burleigh, October 2016

On May 31, 2007, various news media reported that Simon and Schuster and Valerie Wilson were suing J. Michael McConnell, Director of National Intelligence, and Michael V. Hayden, Director of the CIA, arguing that the CIA "is unconstitutionally interfering with the publication of her memoir, Fair Game, ... set to be published in October [2007], by not allowing Plame to mention the dates that she served in the CIA." Judge Barbara S. Jones, of the United States District Court for the Southern District of New York, in Manhattan, interpreted the issue in favor of the CIA. Therefore, the ruling stated that Plame would not be able to describe in her memoir the precise dates she had worked for the CIA. In 2009, the federal court of appeals for the Second Circuit affirmed Judge Jones's ruling.

On October 31, 2007, in an interview with Charlie Rose broadcast on The Charlie Rose Show, Valerie Wilson discussed many aspects relating to her memoir: the CIA leak grand jury investigation; United States v. Libby, the civil suit which she and her husband were at the time still pursuing against Libby, Cheney, Rove, and Armitage; and other matters presented in her memoir relating to her covert work with the CIA.

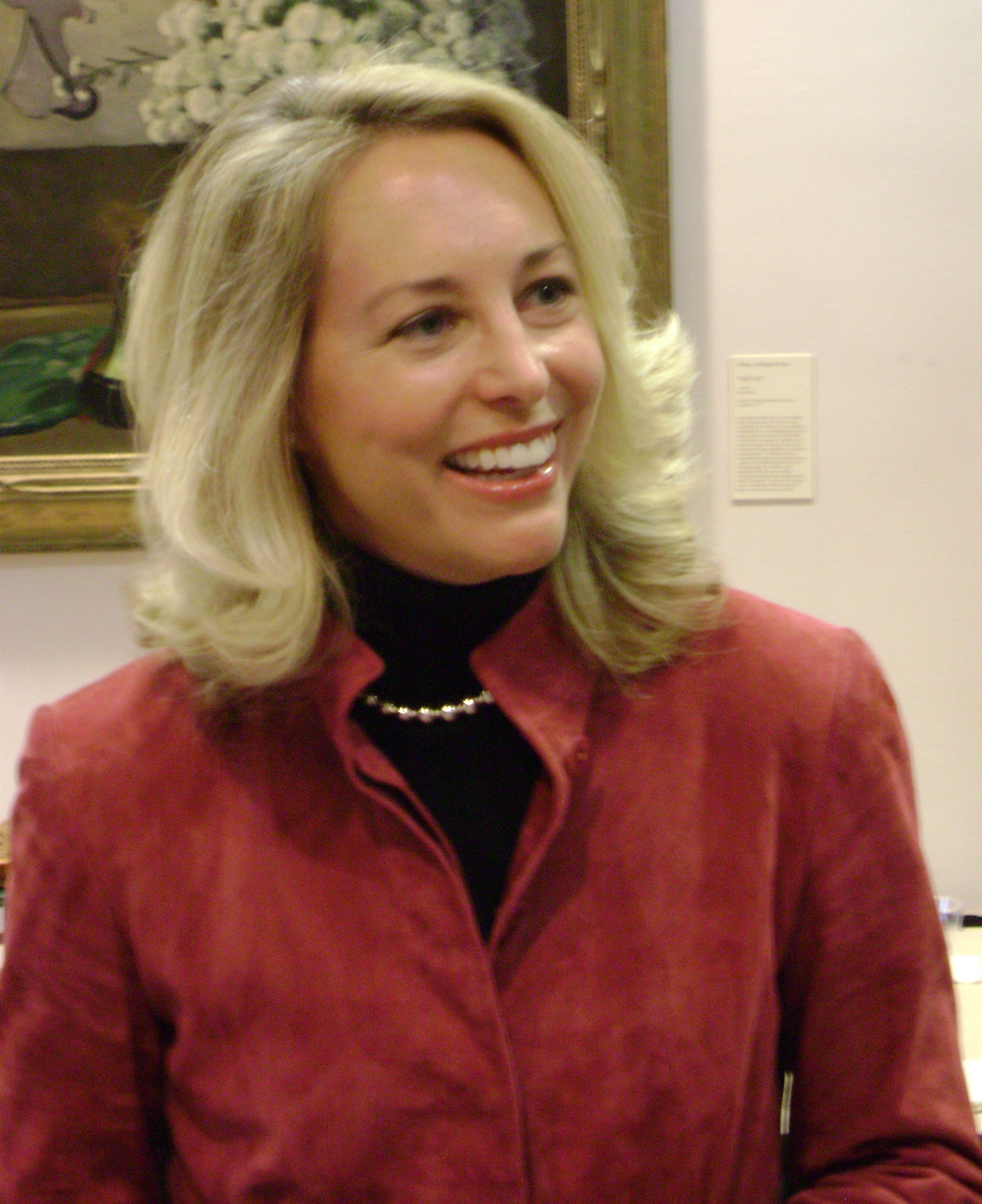
Valerie Plame at Moravian College October 2008

The film, Fair Game, was released November 5, 2010, starring Naomi Watts and Sean Penn. It is based on two books, one written by Plame, and the other by her husband. The Washington Post editorial page, led by editor Fred Hiatt, a vocal supporter of the Iraq War, who blamed Wilson for Plame's identity being leaked, described the movie as being "full of distortions—not to mention outright inventions", while news reporters Walter Pincus and Richard Leiby at The Washington Post disagreed, saying "The movie holds up as a thoroughly researched and essentially accurate account—albeit with caveats".

In May 2011, it was announced that Plame would write a series of spy novels with mystery writer Sarah Lovett. The first book in the series, titled Blowback, was released on October 1, 2013, by Blue Rider Press, an imprint of the Penguin Group.

=== Anti Trump fundraiser ===
In August 2017, Plame set up a GoFundMe fundraising page in an attempt to buy a majority interest in Twitter and kick U.S. President Donald Trump off the network. She launched her campaign because she believes that Donald Trump 'emboldens white supremacists' and encourages 'violence against journalists'.

Titled "Let's #BuyTwitter and #BanTrump", she set the campaign's goal to $1 billion; her campaign raised $88,000.

=== Social media controversy ===
In September 2017, Plame tweeted a link to an article from The Unz Review website posted by Philip Giraldi, titled "America's Jews Are Driving America's Wars", repeating the title of the article in her tweet. The article said that certain "American Jews who lack any shred of integrity" should be given a special label when appearing on television: "kind-of-like a warning label on a bottle of rat poison." Amid criticism, Plame first defended her posts, replying on Twitter that "Many neocon hawks ARE Jewish." She also said that people should "read the entire article" without "biases", writing in defense of herself after the initial backlash: "read the entire article, just for a moment, to put aside your biases and think clearly."

Within two hours, she deleted her initial post and apologized, tweeting "OK folks, look, I messed up. I skimmed this piece, zeroed in on the neocon criticism, and shared it without seeing and considering the rest. I missed gross undercurrents to this article & didn't do my homework on the platform this piece came from. Now that I see it, it's obvious. Apologies all. There is so much there that's problematic AF and I should have recognized it sooner. Thank you for pushing me to look again. I'm not perfect and make mistakes. This was a doozy. All I can do is admit them, try to be better, and read more thoroughly next time, Ugh." Ramesh Ponnuru and Caleb Ecarma have argued that the incident followed a pattern of her posting antisemitic content, and of Plame making jokes about "rich Jews". She had tweeted at least eight articles from the same website before, in which she previously retweeted links to conspiracy theories of 'dancing Israelis' being behind the 9/11 attacks.

=== Congressional run ===
In May 2019, Plame announced her candidacy for the United States House of Representatives for New Mexico's 3rd congressional district in the 2020 elections. The seat, in northern New Mexico, was being vacated by Democratic Representative Ben Ray Luján, who ran for Senate instead. She outspent her rivals with funding from outside her district. On June 2, 2020, she was defeated in the seven-way Democratic primary election by Teresa Leger Fernandez. Fernandez received 44,480 votes, Plame 25,775 votes, and Joseph L. Sanchez 12,292 votes.

== Personal life ==
After graduating from Penn State in 1985, Plame married Todd Sesler; the marriage ended in divorce in 1989. In 1997, while working for the Central Intelligence Agency (CIA), Plame met former Ambassador Joseph C. Wilson. They were married on April 3, 1998. At the time they met, Wilson related in his memoir, he was separated from his second wife Jacqueline. They divorced after 12 years of marriage so that he could marry Plame. They had two children, twins Trevor Rolph and Samantha Finnell Diana, born in 2000. Wilson and Plame divorced in 2017. Wilson died in 2019. Plame married Dr. Joseph Shepard, President of Western New Mexico University, in 2020.

Prior to the disclosure of her CIA job, the family lived in the Palisades, Washington, D.C. After she resigned from the CIA following the disclosure of her CIA position, in January 2006, the family moved to Santa Fe, New Mexico, where Plame served as a consultant to the Santa Fe Institute until 2016. In a 2011 interview, Plame said she and Wilson had received threats while living in the D.C. metro area, and that the New Mexico location was calm.

Plame was involved in the 2016 presidential campaign of Democratic candidate Hillary Clinton.

In December 2024 it was reported that Plame's husband, Joseph Shepard, president of Western New Mexico University was resigning in exchange for a severance package of nearly $2 million, after he and regents of the university were implicated in charges of wasteful spending. "Plame was not a WNMU employee, she was issued a university credit card, which she used to buy" thousands of dollars of furniture and home and office accessories. On October 17, 2025, an independent forensic auditor, overseen by the New Mexico State Auditor, released their report to the public which showed that there was no waste, fraud, abuse, incompetence, personal financial gain, or corruption found for Shepard or the university.

In 2025, Shepard filed a whistleblower and Racketeer Influenced and Corrupt Organizations Act lawsuit against the university and several state officials. The complaint drew parallels between Plame's 2003 CIA leak case and the alleged retaliation against Shepard after he reported suspected fraud by state legislators. The lawsuit alleged that both Plame and Shepard were targeted in a coordinated smear campaign involving media outlets, with defamatory statements published about Plame in her role as "First Lady" of the university. The complaint states that the campaign was orchestrated by state officials to discredit Shepard and silence his fraud allegations against the senators.

== In popular media ==
Plame is the subject of an eponymous song by The Decemberists on their 2008 series of singles Always a Bridesmaid.
