= David Corn =

American journalist (born 1959)

- Corn in 2026
- Born: February 20, 1959 (age 67)
- Education: Brown University (BA)
- Occupations: Journalist; author
- Employer: Mother Jones (since 2007)
- Notable work: Mitt Romney 47 percent story, Russiagate
- Awards: George Polk Award (2012)
- Website: davidcorn.com

David Corn (born February 20, 1959) is an American political journalist and author. He is the Washington, D.C. bureau chief for Mother Jones, author of the newsletter Our Land, and is best known as a cable television commentator. Corn worked at The Nation from 1987 to 2007, where he served as Washington editor.

== Early life and education ==
Corn was raised in a Jewish family in White Plains, New York. He graduated from White Plains High School in 1977. He attended Brown University, where he majored in history and worked for The Brown Daily Herald. After his junior year, he interned at The Nation where he accepted a job as editorial assistant instead of returning to finish his degree. He earned his remaining credits at Columbia University and received a B.A. from Brown in 1982.

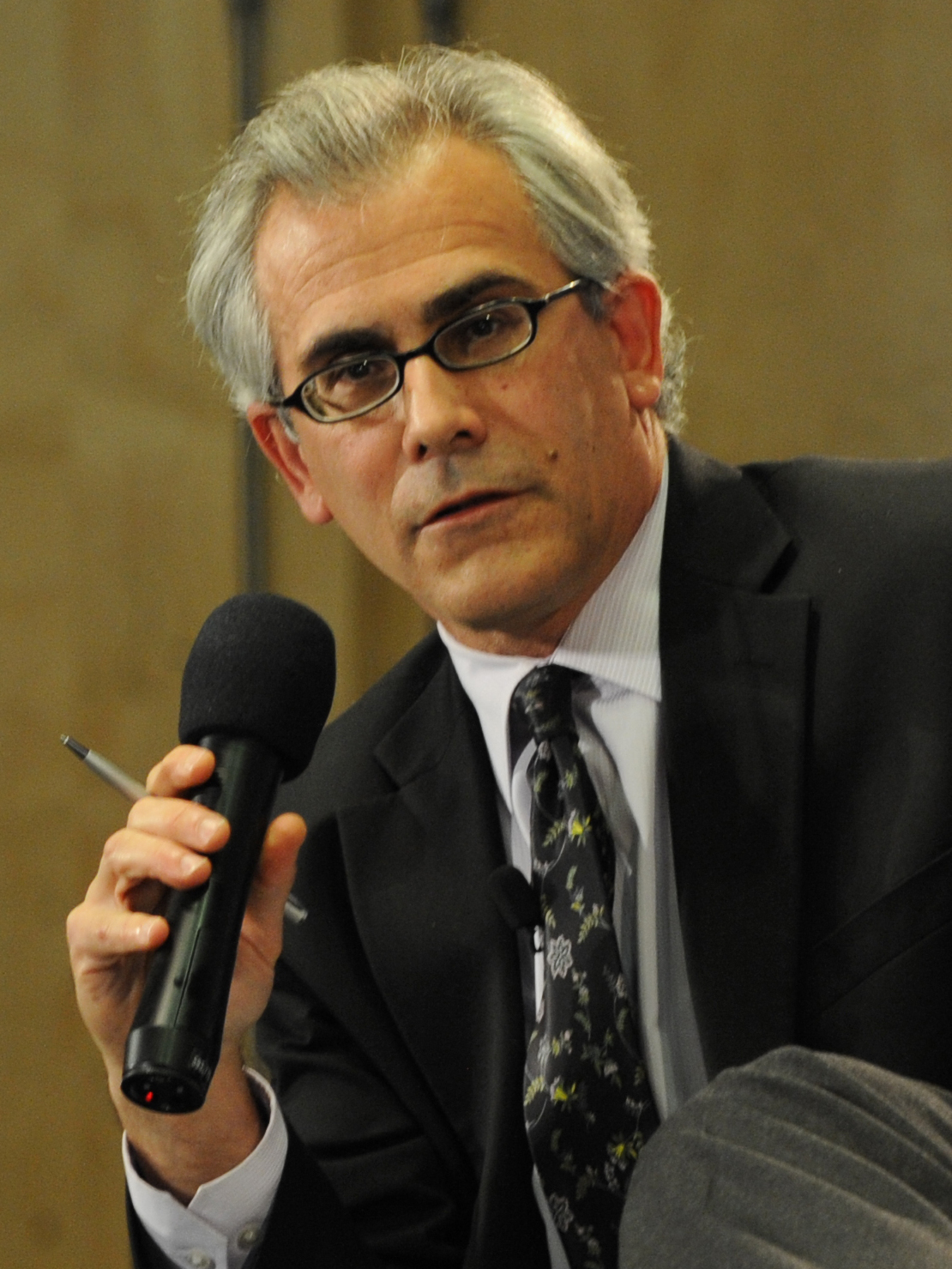
Corn in 2010

== Career ==
Corn was the Washington editor for The Nation and has appeared regularly on FOX News, MSNBC, National Public Radio, and BloggingHeads.tv. He joined Mother Jones in 2007. Corn appeared on FOX News more than sixty times, according to a tally by Politifact.com, before becoming a commentator on MSNBC.

In February 2013, Corn was given the 2012 George Polk Award in journalism in the category of political reporting for his posting of a video and reporting of the "47 percent story", Republican nominee Mitt Romney's videoed meeting with donors during the 2012 presidential campaign.

=== Books ===
Corn's first book was Blond Ghost: Ted Shackley and the CIA's Crusades, a 1994 biography of longtime Central Intelligence Agency official Theodore Shackley, which received mixed reviews. The book used Shackley's climb through the CIA bureaucracy to illustrate how the Agency worked and to follow some of its Cold War-era covert operations. In The Washington Post, Roger Warner called it "an impressive feat of research". In The New York Times, however, Joseph Finder asserted that Corn seriously distorted history to blame Shackley for a series of institutional CIA failings and pointed out a series of serious errors in the book. Among them, Finder said, was that Corn "recycled a long-discredited canard, much beloved by conspiracy theorists, that on the day of President John F. Kennedy's assassination, the agency's chief of covert operations, Desmond Fitzgerald, met in Paris with one of the CIA's Cuban agents and gave him a 'ball-point pen' that could be used to inject Castro with a deadly toxin called Black Leaf 40. FitzGerald was actually the host of a lunch in Washington at the time, at the City Tavern Club in Georgetown."

Corn contributed a short story to Unusual Suspects (1996), a paperback collection of original crime stories. The story was nominated for an Edgar Allan Poe Award.

His novel, Deep Background (1999), is a conspiracy thriller about the assassination of a U.S. president at a White House press conference and the ensuing investigation. Reviews praised Corn's mastery of the political atmosphere and characters, although they split on whether this was a virtue or, coming towards the conclusion of Bill Clinton's term in office, already all-too-familiar territory. Reviewing the book in The New York Times, James Polk opined that although the book included dramatic scenes such as a "seedy nightspot catering to homosexual marines, an interagency hit squad, a high-class look, but don't touch escort service", the novel could not deliver "enough shocks left to sustain the genre". The Washington Post, though, called it a "top-notch conspiracy thriller," with reviewer Les Whitten observing, "This pot-au-feu of a thriller is brimming with gusto in spite of its familiar ingredients: Watergate, Chappaquiddick, the Kennedy assassinations, CIA scandals, congressional corruption and White House aide angst. Every old carrot and potato has been warmed over. Yet when you finish it, the palate wants more. How can this be? Maybe it tastes so good because it's deepened with subtle tangs of Dante, the Apostle John, Robert Penn Warren and some heartbreaker '60s ballads."

Corn was a critic of Clinton's successor, President George W. Bush. Corn's next book, 2003's The Lies of George W. Bush: Mastering the Politics of Deception, said that Bush had systematically "mugged the truth" as a political strategy, and he found fault with the media for failing to report this effectively. The book also broke with journalistic practice for its charge of lying, a word usually avoided as editorializing. In particular, Corn criticized many of the arguments offered to justify the 2003 invasion of Iraq, and he challenged The New York Times columnist William Safire for claiming links between Iraqi leader Saddam Hussein and Al-Qaeda. In Hubris: The Inside Story of Spin, Scandal, and the Selling of the Iraq War, co-written by Michael Isikoff of Newsweek and Corn, they analyzed the Bush administration's drive toward the invasion.

Corn co-wrote the book Russian Roulette: The Inside Story of Putin's War on America and the Election of Donald Trump with journalist Michael Isikoff about the Donald Trump campaign and administration's ties with Russia and Russian hacking during the 2016 presidential campaign, including a history of similar Russian tactics during earlier administrations. The book was released by Twelve in March 2018.

In 2022, he published his book American Psychosis: An Historical Investigation of How the Republican Party Went Crazy, which is a behind-the-scenes account of how the GOP since the 1950s has encouraged and exploited extremism, bigotry, and paranoia to gain power.

In September 2026, his newest book, How Russia Won: Donald Trump, Vladimir Putin, and the Fight for America, was published by Harper.

=== Plame affair ===
Corn was personally involved in the early coverage of the controversy over leaks to the media of the name of CIA officer Valerie Plame. After Robert Novak revealed Plame's identity in his July 14, 2003, column, Corn was among the first to report, several days later, that Plame had been working covertly. He also raised the possibility that the leak of her identity violated the Intelligence Identities Protection Act (IIPA); however, prosecutors found no evidence that those government officials who leaked her name knew she was a covert agent, and no official was ultimately charged with violating the IIPA.

Novak, for his part, disputed that Plame had been a covert operative at the time her identity was revealed. He also objected to the negative portrayal of himself in Hubris, the book in part about the matter by Corn and Isikoff. Novak said of Corn, "Nobody was more responsible for bloating this episode". Novak felt that Corn was too close with former ambassador Joseph Wilson, Plame's husband and a key figure in criticism of the administration's arguments for invasion. However, in early 2007, an unclassified summary of Valerie Plame's employment history at the CIA was disclosed for the first time in a court filing which confirmed that Plame was indeed a covert operative at the time Novak made her name public.

=== Mitt Romney "47 Percent" video and George Polk Award ===
In announcing Corn's being awarded the George Polk Award for 2012, the sponsors wrote:

David Corn of Mother Jones will receive the George Polk Award for Political Reporting ... Through persistent digging and careful negotiation with a source, Corn secured a full recording of Romney at a $50,000-a-plate Florida fundraiser declaring that 47 percent of Americans — those who back President Obama — are "victims" who are "dependent upon government" and "pay no income tax". Corn worked for weeks to obtain the recording ... Furthermore, it was Corn's extensive previous reporting on Romney that convinced the source to trust him with its release.

Corn's article that introduced the secret tape was published online on the Mother Jones on September 17, 2012.

== Works ==
- Blond Ghost: Ted Shackley and the CIA's Crusades. Simon & Schuster. 1994. ISBN 978-0-671-69525-5.
- Grady, James, ed. (1996). Unusual Suspects: An Anthology of Crime Stories. Black Lizard. ISBN 978-0-679-76788-6.
- The Lies of George W. Bush: Mastering the Politics of Deception. Crown. May 25, 2004. ISBN 978-1-4000-8151-6.
- Isikoff, Michael; Corn, David (2007). Hubris: The Inside Story of Spin, Scandal, and the Selling of the Iraq War. Three Rivers Press. ISBN 978-0-307-34682-7.
- Deep Background. Macmillan. April 1, 2010. ISBN 978-1-4299-7248-2.
- Showdown: The Inside Story of How Obama Fought Back Against Boehner, Cantor, and the Tea Party. Harper Collins. March 20, 2012. ISBN 978-0-06-210801-2.
- 47 Percent: Uncovering the Romney Video That Rocked the 2012 Election. Harper Collins. October 9, 2012. ISBN 978-0-06-226681-1.
- Isikoff, Michael; Corn, David (March 13, 2018). Russian Roulette: The Inside Story of Putin's War on America and the Election of Donald Trump. Grand Central Publishing. ISBN 978-1-5387-2874-1.
- American Psychosis: A Historical Investigation of How the Republican Party Went Crazy. Grand Central Publishing. September 13, 2022. ISBN 978-1-5387-2307-4. OCLC 1314286806.
- How Russia Won: Donald Trump, Vladimir Putin, and the Fight for America. Harper. September 15, 2026. ISBN 978-0-0634-8620-1.

== Personal life ==
David has two children and lives in Takoma Park, Maryland.
