= Walter Pincus =

American national security journalist

Walter Haskell Pincus
- Born: December 24, 1932 (age 93); Brooklyn, New York City, U.S.
- Education: Yale University
- Occupation: Journalist
- Writing career
- Subject: National security

Walter Haskell Pincus (born December 24, 1932) is an American national security journalist. He reported for The Washington Post until the end of 2015. He has won several prizes including a Polk Award in 1977, a television Emmy in 1981, and shared a 2002 Pulitzer Prize for National Reporting with five other Washington Post reporters, and the 2010 Arthur Ross Media Award from the American Academy for Diplomacy. Since 2003, he has taught at Stanford University's Stanford in Washington program.

== Early life and education ==
Pincus was born in Brooklyn, New York City, on December 24, 1932, the son of Jewish parents Jonas Pincus and Clare Glassman. He attended South Side High School in Rockville Centre, New York, on Long Island.

Pincus attended Yale University, where he graduated with a B.A. in 1954. In 2001, Pincus graduated from Georgetown University Law Center, where he obtained a J.D. degree.

== Career ==
He served in the Counterintelligence Corps in Washington, D.C. from 1955 to 1957, and worked as a copy-boy for The New York Times.

Pincus served in the U.S. Army. Following his discharge, he worked at the copy desk of the Wall Street Journal's Washington edition, leaving in 1959 to become Washington correspondent for three North Carolina newspapers. In an 18-month sabbatical he took in 1962, he directed his first of two investigations for the Senate Foreign Relations Committee under J. William Fulbright. The investigations into foreign government lobbying led to a revision of the Foreign Agents Registration Act.

In 1963, he joined The Washington Star, and in 1966 he moved to The Washington Post, where he worked until 1969. From 1969 to 1970, he directed another investigation for the Senate Foreign Relations Committee, looking into U.S. military and security commitments abroad and their effect on U.S. foreign policy, which eventually led to the McGovern-Hatfield amendment to end the Vietnam War.

In 1973, Pincus tried to establish a newspaper, aiming at university towns with bad local newspapers, but without success. Believing that he would later buy the magazine, he had become executive editor of The New Republic in 1972, where he covered the Watergate Senate hearings, the House impeachment hearings of Richard Nixon and the Watergate trial.

In 1975, after he was fired from the New Republic, he went to work as consultant to NBC News and later CBS News, developing, writing or producing television segments for network evening news, magazine shows and hour documentaries, and joined The Washington Post the same year.

=== The Washington Post ===
At The Washington Post, Pincus reports on intelligence, defense, and foreign policy. He has written about a variety of news subjects ranging from nuclear weapons and arms control to political campaigns to the American hostages in Iran to investigations of Congress and the Executive Branch. For six years he covered the Iran-contra affair. He covered the intelligence community and its problems arising out of the case of confessed spy Aldrich Ames, allegations of Chinese espionage at the nuclear weapons laboratories.

Pincus attended Georgetown Law School part-time beginning in 1995 and graduated in 2001, at the age of sixty-eight. He has been a visiting lecturer at Yale University. Since 2002, he has taught a seminar at Stanford University's Stanford-in-Washington program.

==== Plame affair ====
In October 2003, Pincus cowrote a story for The Washington Post which described a July 12, 2003 conversation between an unnamed administration official and an unnamed Washington Post reporter. The official told the reporter that Iraq war critic Joe Wilson's wife Valerie Plame worked for the Central Intelligence Agency's (CIA) nonproliferation division, and suggested that Plame had recommended her husband to investigate reports that Iraq's government had tried to buy uranium in Niger.

It later became clear that Pincus himself was the Post reporter in question. Special Counsel Patrick Fitzgerald issued a grand jury subpoena to Pincus on August 9, 2004, in an attempt to discover the identity of Pincus' secret informant. On August 20, 2004, the Post filed a motion to quash the subpoena, but after Pincus' source came forward to speak with investigators, Pincus gave a deposition to Fitzgerald on September 15, 2004; he recounted the 2003 conversation to Fitzgerald but still did not name the administration official. In a public statement afterward, Pincus said that the special prosecutor had dropped his demand that Pincus reveal his source. On February 12, 2007, Pincus testified in court that it was then White House Press Secretary Ari Fleischer, swerving off topic during an interview, who had told him of Plame's identity. Pincus was interviewed about his involvement in the Plame affair, and his refusal to identify his source, in the first episode of Frontline's "News War".

=== Author ===
In 2021, Pincus published Blown to Hell: America's Deadly Betrayal of the Marshall Islanders, a book about the effects of United States nuclear testing in the Marshall Islands.

== Criticism ==
In July 2013, Pincus wrote an article about National Security Agency (NSA) whistleblower Edward Snowden prompting Guardian journalist Glenn Greenwald (himself a subject of the article) to write an open letter to Pincus regarding what he described as "blatant, easily demonstrated falsehoods" including:

1) Pincus stated that I wrote an article about Poitras "for the WikiLeaks Press's blog" (I never wrote anything for that blog in my life; the article he referenced was written for Salon); 2) Pincus claimed Assange "previewed" my first NSA scoop in a Democracy Now interview a week earlier by referencing the bulk collection of telephone calls (Assange was expressly talking about a widely reported Bush program from 8 years earlier, not the FISA court order under Obama I reported); 3) Pincus strongly implied that Snowden had worked for the NSA for less than 3 months by the time he showed up in Hong Kong with thousands of documents when, in fact, he had worked at the NSA continuously for 4 years."

Greenwald and others stated that Pincus also failed to follow standard journalistic best practice in not approaching him for comment or to fact-check his allegations which led his own colleague at the Washington Post to speculate that "Pincus was sticking up for his killer sources in the national security community"—something Pincus denied, despite his widely known ties to and background in the military and intelligence communities.

When unionized Washington Post reporters in The Newspaper Guild withheld bylines to protest a company contract offer, Pincus refused to join his fellow reporters and allowed his byline to be published.

== Honors and awards ==
Pincus has won several newspaper prizes including the 1961 Page One Award for magazine reporting in The Reporter, the George Polk Award in 1977 for stories in The Washington Post exposing the neutron warhead, a television Emmy for writing on the 1981 CBS News documentary series, "Defense of the United States", and in 1999 he was awarded the first Stewart Alsop Award given by the Association of Foreign Intelligence Officers for his coverage of national security affairs. In 2002 he was one of six Washington Post reporters who won a Pulitzer Prize for National Reporting, and in 2010 the Arthur Ross Media Award from the American Academy for Diplomacy.

== Personal life ==
In September 1954, Pincus married Betty Meskin, with whom he has a son. In May 1965, he married his second wife Ann Witsell Terry from Little Rock, Arkansas, with whom he has one daughter and two sons.

== See also ==
- CIA influence on public opinion
