= Citizens for Responsibility and Ethics in Washington =

American nonprofit watchdog organization

- Founded: 2003
- Founder: Norman L. Eisen, Melanie Sloan
- Type: 501(c)(3)
- Tax ID no.: 03-0445391
- Key people: Noah Bookbinder, president and CEO
- Revenue: $11.2 million (2024)
- Website: www.citizensforethics.org

Citizens for Responsibility and Ethics in Washington (CREW) is a progressive nonprofit 501(c)(3) watchdog organization devoted to U.S. government ethics and accountability. Founded in 2003 as a counterweight to conservative government watchdog groups such as Judicial Watch, CREW works to expose ethics violations and corruption by government officials and institutions and to reduce the role of money in politics.

Its activities include investigating, reporting and litigating perceived government misconduct, requesting and forcing government information disclosure through Freedom of information legislation requests, and filing congressional ethics complaints against individuals, institutions and agencies. Its projects have included the publication of "CREW's Most Corrupt Members of Congress", an annual report in which CREW lists the people it determines to be the most corrupt in the federal government of the United States. From 2005 to 2014, the annual reports named 25 Democrats and 63 Republicans.

CREW was founded in 2003 by former federal prosecutor Melanie Sloan and white-collar lawyer Norm Eisen, who went on to serve as President Barack Obama's chief ethics lawyer and later his ambassador to the Czech Republic. Liberal political consultant David Brock became CREW's chairman in 2014 and stepped down in 2016. He was replaced by Richard Painter, who took a leave of absence to run as a Democrat in Minnesota's 2018 U.S. Senate special election. Under Painter's leadership, CREW pursued aggressive litigation against the Trump administration, which it called the "most unethical presidency" in U.S. history. CREW filed 41 lawsuits during George W. Bush's administration, 38 during Obama's administration and, by January 2018, 180 against the Trump administration.

== History ==
Citizens for Responsibility and Ethics in Washington was co-founded in 2003 by Norman L. Eisen and Melanie Sloan in part as a liberal / progressive counterweight to conservative watchdog groups such as Judicial Watch. Sloan initially ran the fledgling organization by herself; by 2007, CREW had 13 staff members. By 2016, the group had four lawyers on staff.

=== Chairmanships of David Brock and Richard Painter ===
In August 2014, liberal political operative David Brock was elected chairman of CREW's board of directors. At the time, Paul Singer of USA Today wrote, "One of the most vocal congressional ethics watchdog groups is becoming part of a Democratic political operation." Politico wrote that Brock's newly announced involvement with CREW was a "major power play that aligns liberal muscle more fully behind the Democratic Party" and that CREW would add a "more politically oriented arm, expand its focus into state politics and donor targeting and will operate in close coordination with Brock's growing fleet of aggressive Democrat-backing nonprofits and super PACs—Media Matters, American Bridge, and the American Independent Institute." Before Brock's involvement with CREW, the group had aggressively targeted Republican public officials as well as some Democrats. The Center for Public Integrity wrote, "Many key staffers left soon after Brock became its chairman, and since then, the organization has almost exclusively pursued Republicans and conservative organizations through federal complaints and its own investigations." In April 2016, Bloomberg reported that Republicans had faced the vast majority of CREW investigations in recent months.

Brock left CREW's board of directors in December 2017, but did not cut ties with the group and continued to raise money for it. He was replaced by former George W. Bush White House ethics lawyer Richard Painter, "lending the group a bipartisan air", according to Politico. Painter took a leave of absence from CREW to run as a Democrat in Minnesota's 2018 U.S. Senate special election.

In December 2016, Politico wrote that since its 2003 founding, CREW had "quickly built a strong reputation as an ethics watchdog and transparency advocate, filing complaints against lawmakers from both parties, though the bulk of its ethics work targeted Republicans. However, in recent years CREW faced increased questions about its credibility, stemming from a 2014 shift that brought the group under Brock's sway and—in the eyes of many observers—into the Clinton orbit. Brock and his allies joined the group's board, while several longtime employees left." In 2015, CREW had revenue of just under $2.2 million. It filed just one lawsuit in 2015 and three in 2016, all asking the Federal Election Commission for stricter enforcement of campaign finance laws.

=== Trump administration ===
CREW aggressively targeted the Donald Trump administration, filing its first lawsuit against Trump three days after his inauguration as U.S. president. According to New York magazine, "Since then, it has been launching actions against the administration and its allies in Congress at a rate of about one a day, filing lawsuits and public-record inquiries and lodging complaints with authorities like the Office of Government Ethics." In June 2017, New York wrote that "CREW is officially nonpartisan, but it's a thin veneer. For the last few years, it has been loosely aligned with a network of organizations, including the super-PAC American Bridge, run by Democratic operative David Brock. After the election, Brock promised to 'kick Donald Trump's ass,' saying in a fund-raising document that CREW's litigation strategy would assure Trump would be 'afflicted by a steady flow of damaging information.'" CREW co-founder Norman L. Eisen rejoined CREW in December 2016 and set about distancing the organization from Brock. Eisen stepped down from the board in February 2019.

In January 2018, CREW issued a 36-page report on Trump's presidency, calling it the "most unethical presidency" in U.S. history. In February 2018, Environment & Energy Publishing wrote that Painter was "at the center of more than 180 legal challenges to Trump and his administration as vice chairman of the left-leaning Citizens for Responsibility and Ethics in Washington."

During the 2020 COVID-19 pandemic, the group received $432,000 in federally backed small business loans from Newtek Small Business as part of the Paycheck Protection Program.

== Activities ==
According to the organization, its activities include litigation, FOIA requests, congressional ethics complaints, Internal Revenue Service complaints, Federal Election Commission complaints, and requests for investigation with government agencies.

CREW's Most Corrupt list

Each year since 2005, CREW has published its "Most Corrupt Members of Congress" report. The 2012 election cycle saw 11 of the 32 lawmakers included in the last two reports either defeated or retiring. As of 2014, the list had named 88 individuals, 63 of them Republicans and 25 Democrats. The last report was in 2013.

Family Affair report

In 2012, CREW released a report entitled Family Affair, which examined how members of Congress had used their positions to benefit themselves and their families. The report included 248 members of the United States House of Representatives, 105 Democrats and 143 Republicans, "about equal to their parties' proportional makeup in the House." Common practices that do not appear to violate laws or House ethics rules but still raise ethical questions include: paying family for congressional office and campaign work, collecting reimbursements from official US House and campaign budgets, earmarking to projects connected with family members, and charging interest on personal loans given to their campaigns.

Criticism of Continuing Appropriations Resolution

CREW raised questions about some of the content of the Continuing Appropriations Resolution, 2014 (H.J.Res 59; 113th Congress). One controversial provision of the bill was section 134, which stated that "notwithstanding any other provision of this joint resolution, there is appropriated for payment to Bonnie Englebardt Lautenberg, widow of Frank R. Lautenberg, late a Senator from New Jersey, $174,000." CREW protested the inclusion of this in the bill, since Lautenberg's assets in 2011 were over $57 million. The group questioned why this "death gratuity" was considered a "top funding priority".

Emoluments Clause

A legal team representing CREW (including Laurence H. Tribe, Norman L. Eisen, Erwin Chemerinsky, Richard Painter, and Zephyr Teachout) announced its intention to file suit in federal court in New York on January 23, 2017, on the grounds that President Donald Trump's business interests violate a provision in the Emoluments Clause in the Constitution by receiving payments from foreign government entities. The suit has asked the court to order Trump to stop receiving payments from foreign government via his hotels, golf courses, rentals and leased properties. United States District Judge George B. Daniels dismissed the case on December 21, 2017, holding that plaintiffs lacked standing. CREW announced plans to appeal, and separate Emolument Clause lawsuits are pending in other judicial districts.

Presidential Records Act

CREW joined with the National Security Archive to challenge Trump's deletion of tweets as a violation of the Presidential Records Act of 1981.

== Personnel ==
Norman L. Eisen, an attorney specializing in fraud, and eventual (in 2009) Special Counsel for Ethics and Government Reform in the White House, co-founded CREW in 2003. He became known for his stringent ethics and anti-corruption efforts, and for limiting registered lobbyists from taking positions in the administration.

Melanie Sloan served as CREW's first executive director. In August 2014 former Republican activist and current Democratic activist David Brock was elected chairman of CREW's board, and Sloan announced her intention to resign as executive director, pending Brock's hiring of a new executive director. Prior to co-founding CREW in 2003, Sloan served as one of more than 300 Assistant U.S. Attorneys in the District of Columbia from 1998 to 2003 after having worked for congressional Democrats John Conyers, Charles Schumer, and Joseph Biden. Mark Penn, pollster for Bill Gates, Tony Blair, both Bill and Hillary Clinton, also became a director and vice president at CREW.

Brock was elected as CREW's board president after laying out a broad plan to turn the organization into a more muscular organization. Along with Brock, consultant David Mercer and investor Wayne Jordan joined CREW's board of directors.

Noah Bookbinder, a former Justice Department prosecutor and Chief Counsel for the U.S. Senate's Judiciary Committee where he advised Judiciary Committee Chairman Senator Patrick Leahy (D-VT), was named executive director of CREW in March, 2015.

Brock left CREW in December 2016, and was replaced as chairman of the board of directors by former George W. Bush ethics lawyer Richard Painter.

Donald K. Sherman is president and CEO. He joined CREW in 2018.

== Allegations of partisanship ==
CREW operates as a 501(c)(3) nonprofit prohibited from engaging in partisan activity. In 2010, Ben Smith of Politico described CREW's founding in 2003 as "one of a wave of new groups backed by liberal donors" and called CREW "a vehicle for assaults on largely—but not entirely—Republican targets", but a 2010 Associated Press story stated that CREW "has a history of targeting members of Congress representing different races, philosophies and both major parties."

Writers for The Washington Post have called CREW a "nonpartisan watchdog group" and a "liberal watchdog", while Fox News has called it "a liberal-funded watchdog group" and the New York Daily News has described it as "nonpartisan". The New York Times has called CREW a "liberal government watchdog group" while U.S. News & World Report calls it "nonpartisan". In a report specifically about CREW, the Chicago Tribune noted the group "calls itself nonpartisan, but progressive", and employs staff from both Republican and Democratic administrations.

After CREW named him one of the "13 most corrupt members of Congress" in 2005, U.S. Senator Conrad Burns (R-MT) called the group "partisan hacks" and their allegations "maliciously false". The Billings Gazette reported that CREW defended itself: Naomi Seligman, the group's deputy director, said "We've gone after a fair number of Democrats, even in this study" [and Burns] "should be answering the charges, not slinging charges."

In 2006, Congressional Quarterly reported, "Citizens for Responsibility and Ethics in Washington has taken aim almost exclusively at GOP members of Congress. Since its founding in 2003, it [helped] investigate 21 lawmakers, only one of them a Democrat" (Senator Blanche Lincoln of Arkansas, in a complaint that also targeted Senator Bill Frist (R-TN), then Senate Majority Leader). A report by McClatchy News Service called CREW "a Democratic-leaning watchdog group".

In 2007, Ms. Magazine quoted longtime Democratic pollster Celinda Lake as saying, "Corruption was a top issue in the [2006] midterm elections, and CREW was critical to the Democrats' success. The fact that they were bipartisan and had created this dirty-dozen list of corrupt politicians really helped people process that these politicians were acting well outside the norm."

The journal Broadcasting & Cable in 2011 described CREW's former chief legal counsel, Anne Weismann, as "a Democrat-recommended witness and so the closest to an [Obama] administration defender".

When asked in 2014 if CREW would continue pursuing complaints against Democrats, Brock responded, "No party has a monopoly on corruption and at this early juncture, we are not making categorical statements about anything that we will and won't do. Having said that, our experience has been that the vast amount of violations of the public trust can be found on the conservative side of the aisle." During a span of "recent months" in early 2016, Republicans were reportedly the target of the vast majority of CREW's campaign-finance allegations.

=== Roll Call article ===
Roll Call reported in January 2008 that CREW files most of its complaints against members of Congress, and "all but a handful ... have targeted Republicans". The article stated that CREW had issued press releases against Democrats but had usually not filed complaints against them, with the exception of now former Senator Mary Landrieu (D-LA), a conservative Democrat. CREW defended itself to Roll Call:

"CREW is a nonpartisan organization that targets unethical conduct", [Deputy Director Naomi] Seligman wrote... "Now that the Democrats are in power, they will have opportunities for corruption that were previously reserved to Republicans and it is likely we will see more Democratic corruption."

After the article was published, CREW stated that it was "baseless" and "omitted key facts". CREW suggested the Roll Call reporter had been prompted by a conversation with Landrieu, the target of a recent CREW lawsuit at the time.

== Funding ==
Roll Call reported that CREW doesn't disclose its donor list, and quoted former Deputy Director Naomi Seligman as saying that "donors play no role in CREW's decisions as to the groups or politicians we target." Donors to CREW have included such groups as Democracy Alliance, Service Employees International Union, the Arca Foundation, and the Gill Foundation.

In January 2012, Democracy Alliance dropped a number of prominent organizations, including CREW, from their list of recommended organizations to receive donations. Support was withdrawn because these groups are more apt to work outside the Democratic Party's infrastructure.

== See also ==
- Campaign for Accountability
- Center for Effective Government
- Government Accountability Project
- Project On Government Oversight
