= Michael Isikoff =

American investigative journalist (born 1952)

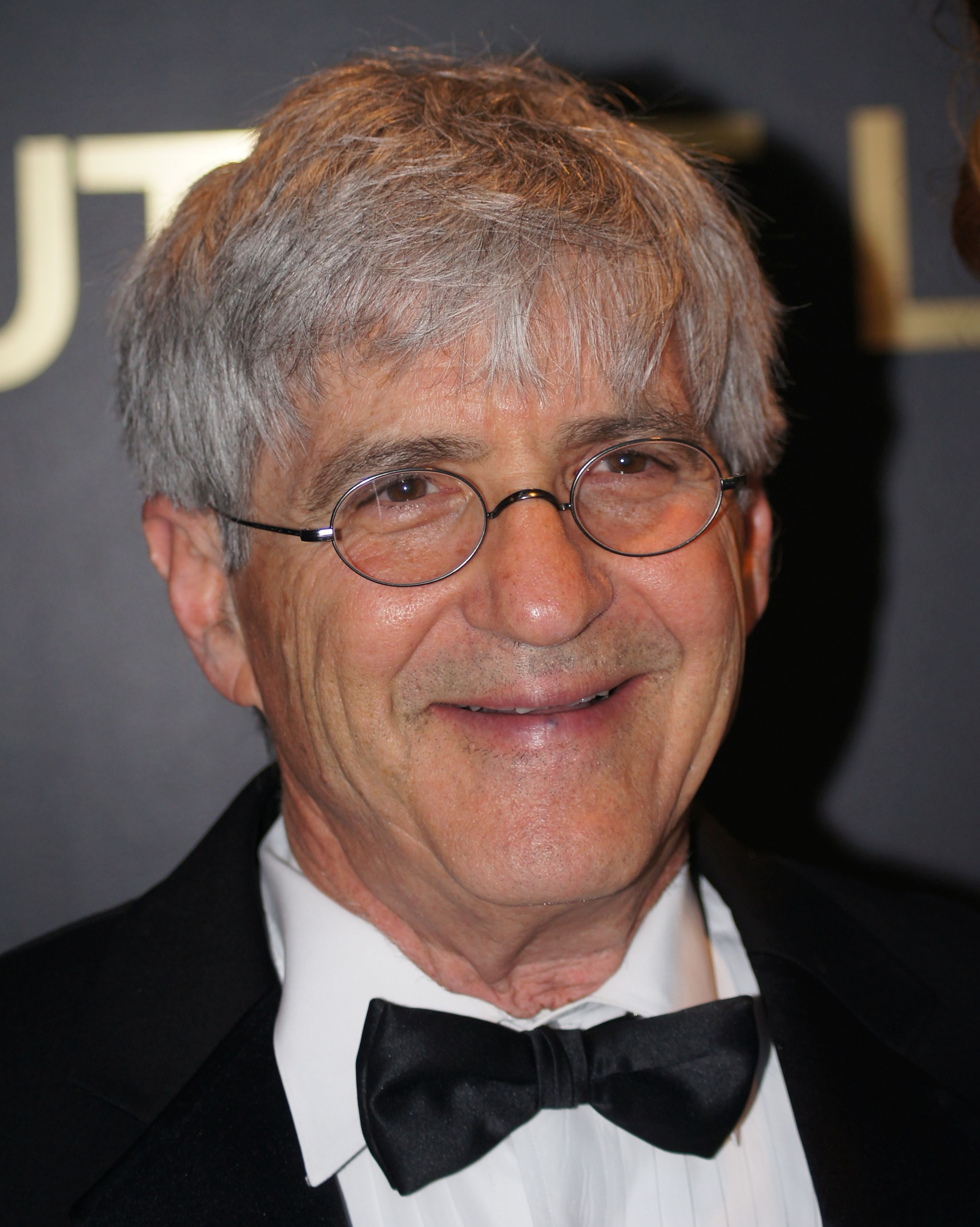
- Isikoff at the White House Correspondents' Dinner in 2019
- Born: June 16, 1952 (age 73); Syosset, New York, U.S.
- Education: Washington University in St. Louis (BA); Northwestern University (MA)
- Occupation: Investigative journalist
- Spouse(s): Lisa Stein (divorced) Mary Ann Akers (m. 2007)
- Children: 2

Michael Isikoff (born June 16, 1952) is an American investigative journalist who used to be the Chief Investigative Correspondent at Yahoo! News. He is the co-author with David Corn of the book titled Russian Roulette: The Inside Story of Putin's War on America and the Election of Donald Trump, published on March 13, 2018.

From July 2010 to April 2014, Isikoff was the national investigative correspondent for NBC News. He resigned from NBC, citing the network's move in a direction that left him with "fewer opportunities" for his work. He had previously worked for Newsweek, which he joined as an investigative correspondent in June 1994, and wrote extensively on the U.S. government's war on terror, the Abu Ghraib torture and prisoner abuse, campaign finance and congressional ethics abuses, presidential politics and other national issues.

Isikoff had been prepared to break the Clinton–Lewinsky scandal, but several hours before going to print, the article was killed by top Newsweek executives. As a result, the story broke first on Matt Drudge's Drudge Report the following morning. Isikoff's book on the subject, Uncovering Clinton: A Reporter's Story, was named Best Non-Fiction Book of 1999 by the Book of the Month Club.

== Early life ==
Isikoff was born to a Jewish family, the son of Gertrude "Trudy" (née Albert) and Morris Isikoff. He was raised in Syosset, New York. He has one sister.

Isikoff graduated from Syosset High School on Long Island in 1970. He received his A.B. from Washington University in St. Louis in 1974, with a junior year abroad at the University of Durham, England, and obtained a master's from the Medill School of Journalism from Northwestern University in 1976.

== Career ==
While still in graduate school, Isikoff found work with the Alton Telegraph at a salary of $100 per week. In 1978 he was on staff with the Washington, D.C.–based States News Service, where he focused on Illinois-based stories.

Isikoff was a part of the Newsweek team that won the Overseas Press Club's most prestigious award, the 2001 Ed Cunningham Memorial Award for best magazine reporting from abroad for Newsweek's coverage of the war on terror. Isikoff has also been a contributing blogger at HuffPost, and has appeared on the Democracy Now! show.

In the May 9, 2005, issue of Newsweek, Isikoff co-wrote an article that stated that interrogators at Guantanamo Bay "in an attempt to rattle suspects, flushed a Quran down a toilet." Detainees had earlier made similar complaints, but this was the first time a government source had appeared to confirm the story. The article caused widespread rioting and massive anti-American protests throughout some parts of the Islamic world, resulting at least 17 deaths in Afghanistan. The magazine later retracted the story after noting that the anonymous official who was their source subsequently could not remember important details. A subsequent June 4, 2005, report by the Pentagon, however, confirmed multiple instances of desecration of the Quran at Guantanamo, including one incident in which a guard's urine came through an air vent and splashed on a detainee and his Quran.

Isikoff's online column with fellow journalist Mark Hosenball, "Terror Watch," won the 2005 award from the Society of Professional Journalists for best investigative reporting online.

Isikoff is the co-author, with journalist David Corn, of Hubris: The Inside Story of Spin, Scandal, and the Selling of the Iraq War, a 2006 book about the selling of the 2003 invasion of Iraq to the U.S. public and the ensuing Plame affair. The book was a New York Times best-seller.

A September 23, 2016, Yahoo News article written by Isikoff was cited by federal authorities in a FISA warrant application in order to justify the surveillance of Carter Page, who was alleged to have a connection to Russian authorities during the 2016 presidential campaign. This article is also cited in the Nunes memo. Nunes claimed that Isikoff's article was wrongly used by the FBI as independent corroboration for the Steele Dossier, when in fact the dossier's author was the article's source. The Inspector General later confirmed that the FISA application "incorrectly assess[ed] that Steele did not directly provide information to Yahoo News."

Isikoff was a creator of the 2017 short film 64 Hours In October: How One Weekend Blew Up The Rules Of American Politics regarding events around October 7–9, 2016 relating to alleged Russian interference in the 2016 United States elections.

In 2018, Isikoff claimed that Linda Tripp offered to take the infamous blue dress (claimed to have been marked with Bill Clinton's semen as a result of a sexual encounter with Monica Lewinsky) from Lewinsky's closet and hand it over to him. Isikoff allegedly refused, saying he didn't want to take possession of stolen property and did not have access to President Bill Clinton's DNA to test the evidence on the dress anyway.

In a 2021 investigative report for Yahoo! News with colleagues, Isikoff uncovered a CIA plot to kidnap Julian Assange from the Ecuadorian embassy in London, though the plan was reportedly never approved.

In 2024, Isikoff's new book with co-author Daniel Klaidman was released. Titled Find Me the Votes, it centered on the efforts to challenge the 2020 United States presidential election results in the state of Georgia.

== Personal life ==
In January 2007, Isikoff married former Washington, D.C. political gossip columnist Mary Ann Akers, who wrote "The Sleuth" for The Washington Post. They have a son, Zachary Akers Isikoff, born in 2009. Isikoff was previously married to Lisa Stein, with whom he has a daughter, Willa Isikoff.

== List of works ==
- Uncovering Clinton: A Reporter's Story (1999)
- Hubris: The Inside Story of Spin, Scandal, and the Selling of the Iraq War (2006)
- Russian Roulette: The Inside Story of Putin's War on America and the Election of Donald Trump (2018)
- Find Me the Votes: A Hard-Charging Georgia Prosecutor, a Rogue President, and the Plot to Steal an American Election (2024)
