= Aʻeaʻe =

A‘ea‘e
- Genres: Hawaiian Music, Country Music
- Instruments: Guitar, ukulele, bass, drums
- Years active: 2022–present
- Website: aeaemusichawaii.com

A‘ea‘e is a Hawaiian music group composed of Keola Donaghy, Tarvin Makia, Kenneth Makuakāne, Māpuana Makia and Jeff Dayton. The group was established in 2022, and released its debut EP (Extended play release) on December 30, 2022. The release included a vocal performance by Māpuana Makia. A‘ea‘e was entered in ten categories for the 46th Annual Nā Hōkū Hanohano Awards and a finalist in four categories. They were honored with two awards - Hawaiian EP of the Year and as Group of the Year at the Awards program held on July 1, 2023, at the Hawaii Theatre.

A‘ea‘e's first public performance was at a fundraiser for Ka Waihona O Ka Na‘auao Public Charter School in Nanakuli on June 6, 2023, followed by a performance at the Blue Note Hawaii in the Outrigger Waikīkī Resort on May 7, 2023, at 7 PM.

== Group Members ==
Dr. Keola Donaghy is an associate professor of Music and faculty coordinator of Music Studies at UH Maui College, has published numerous articles on Hawaiian language and Hawaiian music, is a prolific haku mele (composer of Hawaiian language poetry). His compositions have been recorded by Kealiʻi Reichel, The Pandanus Club, Willie K and Amy Hānaialiʻi Gilliom, the De Lima ‘Ohana, O’Brian Eselu, and many others. He has produced five CDs by students in his Institute of Hawaiian program at UHMC. These releases have garnered three Nā Hōkū Hanohano Awards: in 2016 for their compilation CD Aloha ‘Ia Nō ‘O Maui, in 2019 for their Hawaiian EP release He Lani Ko Luna, He Honua Ko Lalo, and in 2022 for their compilation CD Āwaiaulu ‘Ia E Ke Aloha No Moloka‘i.

Tarvin Makia, born on O‘ahu but residing on Maui for over 40 years, played with the popular Maui groups Hau‘ula and Mele ‘Ohana, and has performed as a solo artist and sideman for fellow musicians and groups, including a multi-year stint with the group Hapa. Makia has released two full albums of his original music, including a Christmas release this year entitled Makia Kalikimaka.

Jeff Dayton has also enjoyed a career of over 40 years, including a 15 year stint as guitarist and musical director for Glen Campbell. He also toured with Lee Greenwood and country music superstar Kenny Chesney, performed live with Willie Nelson, Vince Gill, Tanya Tucker, Toby Keith, Buck Owens and Bo Diddley. His compositions and recordings have been used on Hawaii Five-0 (2010 TV series) and The Voice (American TV series), and recorded by George Strait. For the past decade, he has enjoyed a successful career as a solo artist, songwriter, and songwriting clinician at venues around the world. His latest album, Tropical Troupador was released in October 2022.

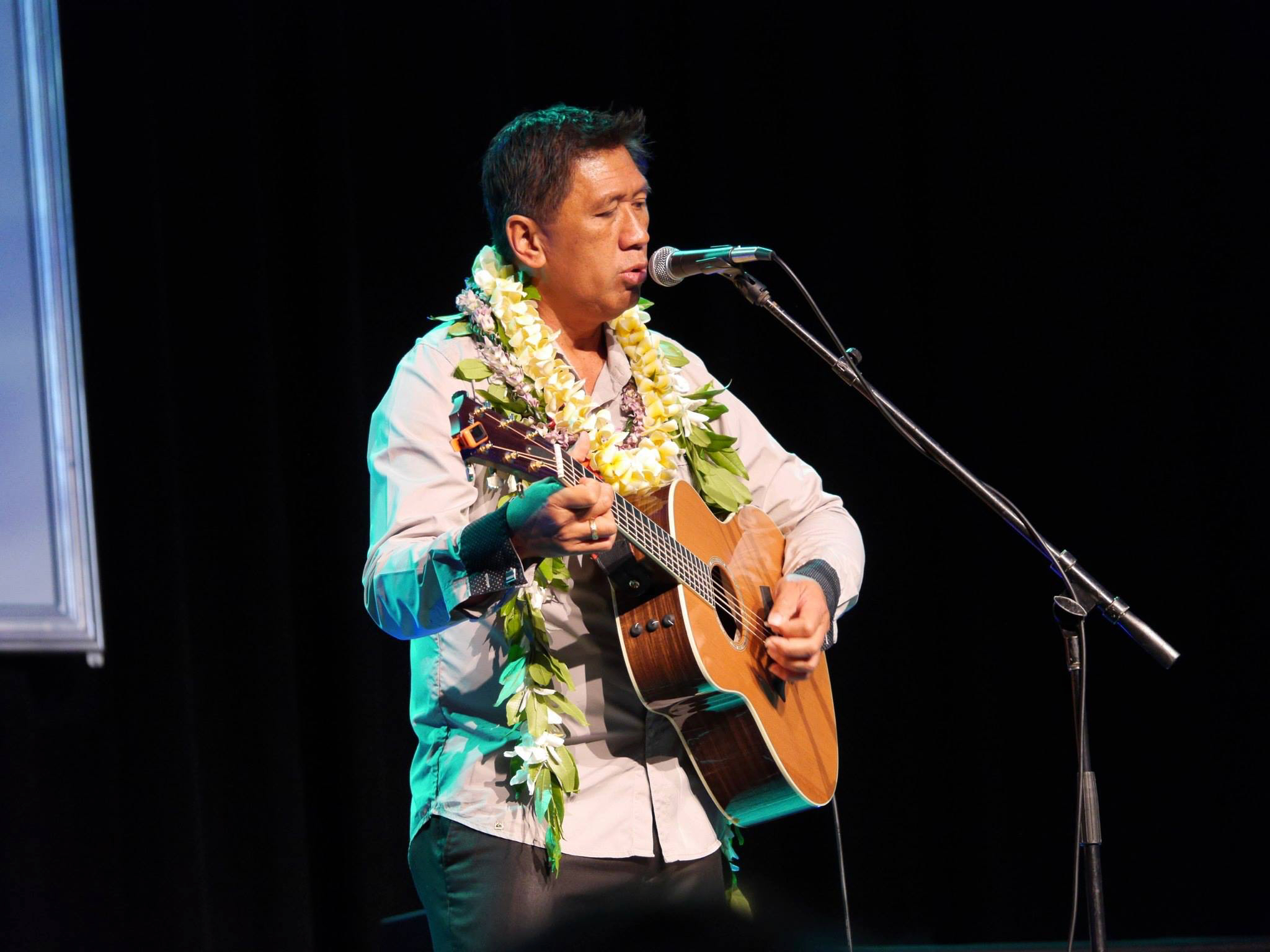
Kenneth Makuakāne performing at the Nā Hōkū Hanohano Awards

Kenneth Makuakāne is a legend in the Hawai‘i music industry, having composed, performed, produced and recorded with the groups Ka‘eo, The Pandanus Club, and as a solo artist. He has composed over 2,000 songs, honored with 21 Na Hoku Hanohano Awards, and produced over a hundreds releases by fellow Hawai‘i artists. He was honored with the Hawaiʻi Academy of Recording Arts “Lifetime Achievement Award” in 2016, and served on the academy's Board of Governors for many years. He is also currently Kahu (pastor) at the historic Kawaiahaʻo Church on O‘ahu.

Māpuana Makia sang harmony vocals with her father Tarvin Mākia on the EP's opening track, “Ku‘u Ipo Ma Ke Kai Loa." Māpuana appears in the Disney+ series Doogie Kameāloha, M.D. in the recurring role as Dr. Noelani Nakayama. She has also appeared in the movie Finding ʻOhana, The Good Doctor (American TV series), Castle (TV series), How to Get Away with Murder, Hawaii Five-0 (2010 TV series), Criminal Minds, and Fantasy Island (2021 TV series).

== Guest Artists and Other Contributors ==
A‘ea‘e includes recorded performances by several notable musicians:

Jim Riley (drummer) performed drums on A‘ea‘e's final track, “I Ka La‘i O Lahaina.” Riley was the drummer for the country group Rascal Flatts until the group disbanded in 2020. Riley is an in-demand drum clinician, and was voted "Best Country Drummer" by Modern Drummer magazine in 2017. He currently tours with former Rascal Flatts lead vocalist Gary LeVox.

Andy Peake performed drums on “Tennessee Whiskey.” Peake has toured and recorded with country music artists Don Williams, Lee Roy Parnell, Delbert McClinton, and others.

== Honors ==
A‘ea‘e was a finalist for four Nā Hōkū Hanohano Awards for the 2023 Nā Hōkū Hanohano Awards in the Hawaiian EP of the Year, Group of the Year, Hawaiian Single of the Year, and Hawaiian Engineering. On July 1, 2023, their release "A‘ea‘e" was awarded the Hawaiian EP of the Year award, and was also named Group of the Year. Group members Makuakāne and Donaghy were also selected as the winners of the Anthology Album of the Year as co-producers of Makuakāne's "Huliau" release along with Pono Makuakāne and Jim Uyeda.

On February 16, 2023, A‘ea‘e was awarded the Big Island Music Award (B.I.M.A.) for best CD-EP along with co-winner Lee Gonsalves.
