= Patty Parker =

American singer and drummer

Patty Parker is an American singer, drummer, producer, and co-owner of independent record label, Comstock Records. In the mid-1970s she and her future husband, Frank Fara (Fafara) toured the Nevada casino circuit in their traveling Country music show, The Frank Fara Show featuring Patty Parker. Parker sang background vocals and was one of the only female drummers touring. In 1978, Parker and Fara launched Comstock Records and experienced immediate success with their first artist, Alex Fraser, whose single peaked at #9 on the Canadian Country music charts. Parker was one of the first full-time female music producers in Nashville and her success caught the attention of Billboard, Cashbox, Music Row Magazine, The Wall Street Journal, CNN and many local newspapers across Canada and the United States.

== Early life ==
Patty Parker grew up Shawnee, Kansas, just outside of Kansas City, Missouri. Patty's father, Will Yeats, was the music director of a Baptist church and Patty grew up singing harmonies in her church choir. In college she earned her bachelor's degree in music education from John Brown University and toured the U.S. with the school's vocal gospel ensemble, the Harmonaires. After college, Parker worked as a music teacher in the Shawnee Mission School District and helped “arrange the sounds” for various school productions. After three years of teaching, Parker moved to California to pursue her dream of becoming a singer/performer.

== The Frank Fara Show featuring Patty Parker ==
In California, Parker worked as a secretary for a construction company until she met songwriter and former teen idol from Phoenix, Arizona, Frank Fara. After playing a jam session with each other, the two decided to continue working together. With two other musicians (Paul Marshall/bass, Keith Johnson/lead guitar), they put together a country music road show. Fara wrote the songs and was the lead singer; Parker sang backup vocals and played the drums. The show was originally named The Frank Fara Show, but when audiences reacted enthusiastically to Parker's performances, they renamed the show, The Frank Fara Show featuring Patty Parker.

For five years, their show toured the Nevada casino circuit and venues across the U.S. and Canada. While on tour, Parker and Fara visited local radio stations to share their latest singles and to create relationships with disc jockeys. Eventually Parker and Fara decided to record a studio-produced album. While doing so, Parker discovered she enjoyed working in the studio more than she enjoyed touring.

== Co-founder, producer, and vice president of Comstock Records ==
In 1978, Parker and husband, Fara, transitioned out of their traveling road show and into the record business. The team launched Comstock Records, and had an immediate charting hit with Canadian artist Alex Fraser. His (and their) first single, Four States to Go, reached #9 on the Canadian Country music charts. Parker and Fara soon discovered that artists from around the world were interested in recording authentic-sounding Country music songs. While the headquarters for Comstock Records was located in Shawnee, Kansas, Parker produced and recorded their music in top recording studios in Nashville, Tennessee. She worked with Nashville session musicians such as Tony Migliore, Ralph Childs, Sonny Garrish, Clyde Brooks, Mike Severs, and Don Roth, to provide artists with the authentic Nashville sound. In addition, Parker provided audio tapes and wrote lyrics phonetically to teach artists the country-western way of enunciating. Parker produced artists from many countries across the world including Australia, Canada, Croatia, Ireland, Sweden, Norway, Denmark, Belgium, the US, and elsewhere.

In 1988, Comstock moved to Scottsdale, Arizona, but continued to record in Nashville. Parker and Fara also formed the subsidiary label, Paylode Records, for adult contemporary and Pop music. They also created two publishing companies, White Cat (ASCAP) and Rocky Bell (BMI).

== Awards and recognition ==
In 1985 Comstock artists were nominated for 10 Canadian Country Music Awards, including one for record company of the year. In 1986 five of Comstock records made the Cashbox Top 100. In 1989, Parker was named “Music Row’s Favorite Independent Female Record Producer” by Music Row magazine. Many of Comstock's artists achieved charting success and received Country music awards in their own countries. In 1998, Comstock Records was named Indie Record Label of the Year by the European Country Music Association (ECMA). Parker's success captured the attention of Billboard, Cashbox, The Wall Street Journal, CNN, and local newspapers and news stations across North America.

== Legacy ==
Many of Parker's recordings and much of Comstock's catalog now reside with independent record label, Fervor Records, which has placed many of their songs in TV and film.

== Partial discography ==
=== As producer ===
Artist	Record label	Album	Format	Cat #	Country	Release date
The Steeles	Comstock Records	Faith/My Happiness	7"	1630	US	1976
Alex Fraser	Comstock Records	Midnight Star/Devils Oval	7", Single, Promo, 45 RPM	COM 1634	US	1979
Alla Dee Franklin	Comstock Records	Garage Sale	7", Single, Promo	COM 1636	US	1979
The O'Roark Brothers	Comstock Records	Long Time Comin'	LP, Album	COM 980	US	1982
The O'Roark Brothers	Comstock Records	Long Time Comin'	7", Single, Promo	COM 1641	US	1980
The O'Roark Brothers	Comstock Records	Under the Double Nickel	7", Single, Promo	COM 1647	US	1980
Ray Lansbery	Comstock Records	Heartache Remover	7", Vinyl, 45 RPM	COM 1655	US	1981
Bob Jones	Comstock Records	Woman Unsatisfied/She's Not A Fallen Angel	7", Single	COM 1671	US	1981
Don TeBeaux	Comstock Records	A Park of Mee	LP, Album	COM-982	US	1982
Don TeBeaux	Comstock Records	Christmas Without You/To Love My Woman More	7", Single, Vinyl, 45 RPM	COM 1694	US	1982
Don TeBeaux	Comstock Records	Put Me In My Place/ A Part of Me	7", Single, 45 RPM,Vinyl	COM 1735	US	1984
Buddi Day	Comstock Records	Lovin' Time of Night	7", Single, Vinyl	COM 1684	US	1982
Buddi Day	Comstock Records	The Last Desperado	7", Single, Vinyl	COM 1696	US	1982
Debbie Martin	Comstock Records	Moments of Love/The Price I Pay (For Loving You Again)	7", Single, Vinyl, 45 RPM	COM 1675	US	1982
Bill Hersh	Comstock Records	Babysittin' With The Blues/Curly's Theme	7", Vinyl, 45 RPM	COM 1710	US	1983
Don Malena	Comstock Records	New Shade of Blue	7" Single, Vinyl, 45 RPM	COM 1753	US	1984
Don Malena	Comstock Records	I've Been Down	7", Single, Vinyl, 45 RPM	COM 1762	US	1984
Don Malena	Comstock Records	I'm Not Tough Enough (To Fall in Love Again)	7", Single, Vinyl, 45 RPM	COM 1775		1985
Don Malena	Comstock Records	Lightning	7", Single, Vinyl, 45 RPM	COM 1784	US	1985
Don Malena	Comstock Records	One More Night	7', Single	COM 1793		1985
Lee Mahony	Comstock Records	Freedom is Only Another Word For Lonely/One Good Turn	7", Vinyl	COM 1727 A	US	1983
Reg Watkins & Lori Kristin	Comstock Records	Oklahoma Memory	7", Vinyl, 45 RPM	COM-1704 B	US	1983
Reg Watkins & Lori Kristin	Comstock Records	Stop and Think It Over	7"	COM 1734	US	1983
Anne Lord	Comstock Records	Endlessly	7"	COM 1717		1983
Anne Lord	Comstock Records	Stars in My Eyes				1985
Anne Lord	Comstock Records	Blue Rain		COM 1923		1989
Peter Chipman	Comstock Records	For All Those Years/ She Can Survive	7", Vinyl, 45 RPM	COM 1781	US & Canada	1984
Pegasus	Comstock Records	More Than a Friend/Last Chance Saloon	7", Vinyl, 45 RPM	COM 1773	US	1985
Sherry Ann	Comstock Records	Don't Waste Your Love On Her Tonight	7", Vinyl, Single	COM 1792	US	1985
Billie J. Helmkay	Comstock Records	Nothing Could Ever Be the Same				1985
Alibi	Comstock Records	Til The Fire's Burned Out	7", Vinyl, 45 RPM	COM 1813	US	1986
Alibi	Comstock Records	No Doubts	CD, Album	COM 1884	Canada	unknown
Priscilla Wright	Comstock Records	Words On The Wire	Vinyl, 7", 45 RPM, Single	COM 1801	US	1986
Priscilla Wright	Comstock Records	God Bless You Baby	7", Single	COM 1983	US	1990
Rick Harrelson	Comstock Records	Lovin' You Like This	Vinyl, 7"	COM 1827	US	1986
Rae Palmer	Comstock Records	Call Me Up	Vinyl, 7"	COM 1830	US	1986
RJ McClintock	Comstock Records	When Two Hearts Speak (You Just Can't Stop The Feeling)	7"	COM 1836	US	1987
Fred Brown	Comstock Records	Please Handle With Care	7"	COM 1870	US	1987
Johnny Ramone	Comstock Records	Where Did I Go Right	7", Single	COM 1911	US	1988
James Edward Holmes	Comstock Records	I Got Your Memory on the Line	7", Single	COM 1920-A	US	1989
John Lindsey	Comstock Records	Am I The Only One		COM1922		1989
Rodney Young	Comstock Records	Bad Habits	7", Single	COM 1985	US	1990
The Crosby's	Comstock Records	Hit & Run	7", Single	COM 1980	US	1990
Thomas E Thomas	Comstock Records	The Mighty Buffalo	Vinyl, 7", 45 RPM, Limited Edition, Stereo	COM 2038	US	1990
Jess Owen	Comstock Records	Remember Me	Vinyl, 7", 45 RPM	NR-1992-A	US	1990
Stoker Brothers	Comstock Records	Dance a Little Closer/Dance a Little Closer		COM 1981		1990
Stoker Brothers	Comstock Records	Love On The Run	Vinyl, 7", Single, Promo	COM 2027	US	1991
The Roberts Sisters	Comstock Records	Daddy Was A Lawman	7", Single	COM 2008	US	1991
Ray Dean James	Comstock Records	When All the Trains Are Gone	7", Single	COM 2011	US	1991
Debbie Baker	Comstock Records	Send Me A Picture	Vinyl, 7", 45 RPM, Single	COM 2014	US	1991
Jodie Sinclair	Comstock Records	I Can't Help Feelin' Crazy	Vinyl, 7", 45 RPM, Single	COM 2016	US	1991
White Canyon	Comstock Records	Our Love's Not Perfect	7", Single	COM 2017	US	1991
Jeff Southern	Comstock Records	Highway to Heaven	7", Single	COM 2019	US	1991
Colin Clark	Comstock Records	The Price For Loving You	7", Single	COM 2021	US	1991
Colin Clark	Comstock Records	Boogie Woogie Thang	Vinyl, 7", Single	COM 2093	US	1993
Dusty Martin	Comstock Records	Ain't Nothin Been The Same	Vinyl, 7", 45 RPM	COM 2103	US	1993
Horst Krush	Comstock Records	Portrait of a Cowboy	7", Single	COM 2022	US	1991
Jess Owen	Comstock Records	Big Boys Don't Cry	7", Single	COM 2023	US	1991
Double Gage	Comstock Records	Car Singer	Vinyl, 7", 45 RPM	COM 2058	US	1992
Gregg Weaver	Comstock Records	The Stars Disappear With The Rising Sun	Vinyl, 7", Single	COM 2091	US	1993
Claudia	Comstock Records	I Can Tell	Vinyl, 7", Single	COM 2092	US	1993
Arizona Trilogy (Patty Parker vocals)	Comstock Records	Song of the Grand Canyon	CD, Single	COM-716-CDS	US	1994
Abby & Johnny	Comstock Records	Crossing the Pond	CD, Album, Comp. Stereo	COM-1001-CD	US	1994
Cindy Stines	Comstock Records	Watch and Pray	CD, Single	COM1013-CDS	Europe	1995
Christopher Lee Clayton	Comstock Records	Livin'Alone Together/The Folks Across the Street	CD, Single	COM 1022-CDS	US	1996
Various Artists	Comstock Records	Comstock Records International Country Music Sampler Summer 1996		COM SM96		1996
Howdy	Comstock Records	Still Straight	CD, Album	COM 3141	US	1999
Frank Fara (Fafara)	Comstock Records	Charming Billy, Billy The Kid	Single			2006
Frank Fara (Fafara)	Comstock Records	Songs of the Untamed West			US	2008
Frank Fara (Fafara)	Comstock Records	Custer's Last Command	Single		US	2010
Frank Fara (Fafara)	Comstock Records	Tombstone Legacy	Single		US	2014
Frank Fara (Fafara)	Comstock Records	Ride with Pancho Villa	Single		US	2014
Patty Parker	Comstock Records	La Noche Buena, It's Christmas Eve	Single		US	2005
Patty Parker	Comstock Records	Southwestern Serenade	CD		US	2007
Patty Parker	Comstock Records	Song of the Grand Canyon	Single		US	2010
Patty Parker	Comstock Records	Hotel Saguaro	Single		US	2014
Scheibee & Foosen	Comstock Records	News For You	CD, Album, Super Jewel Case	SFCR-092708-CD	US	2009
Rick Greysun	Comstock Records	Jesus Came With Music/I Just Cry Unto You Lord	7", Single	COM-1639	US	unknown
Gary Kirkland	Comstock Records	Heartful of Love/Are You From Dixie	7"	COM 1858		unknown

=== As performing artist ===
Artist	Record label	Album title	Format	CAT #	Country	Release date
Frank Fara/Patty Parker	Comstock Records	Frank Fara/Patty Parker	LP	COM 977	US	1977
Arizona Trilogy (Patty Parker vocals)	Comstock Records	Song of the Grand Canyon	CD, Single	COM-716-CDS	US	1994
Patty Parker	Comstock Records	La Noche Buena, It's Christmas Eve	Single		US	2005
Patty Parker	Comstock Records	Southwestern Serenade	CD		US	2007
Patty Parker	Comstock Records	Song of the Grand Canyon	Single		US	2010
Patty Parker	Comstock Records	Hotel Saguaro	Single		US	2014
Patty Parker	Fervor Records	Help You Find a Way	4xFile, MP3, EP, 256		US	2016

== Film and TV ==
Artist	Song	Show title	Channel	Program type	Episode	Release date
Billie J. Helmkay	"You"re Spreading My Hurt Around"	Red Oaks	Amazon	TV	205	11/11/16
Bob Jones	"Woman Unsatisfied"	Claws	TNT	TV	105	7/17/17
Bob Jones	"Woman Unsatisfied"	The Americans	FX	TV	504	3/28/17
Bobbie Bowlin	"Trying to Be An Outlaw"	Red Oaks	Amazon	TV	306	10/20/17
Debbie Martin	"Moments of Love"	King of the Road	Viceland	TV	203	5/9/17
Gale Wahl	"The Hard Times All Over Again"	Channel Zero	SyFy	TV	102	10/18/16
Gina Samuels	"Lonely Hearts Lover"	Red Oaks	Amazon	TV	207	11/11/16
Kathy Tate	"I Am Your Lady"	Get Hard	na	Film		2015
Mitch Clark	"Close Your Eyes and Count to Ten"	Red Oaks	Amazon	TV	205	11/11/16
Mitch Clark	"Close Your Eyes and Count to Ten"	The Americans	FX	TV	304	11/11/16
Patty Parker	"Help You Find a Way"	Preacher	AMC	TV	105	6/26/16
Ray Lansberry	"Heartache Remover"	Claws	TNT	TV	107	7/23/17
Susan Doll	"Be My Cowboy Tonight"	Preacher	AMC	TV	107	7/10/16
Susan Doll	"Be My Cowboy Tonight"	Channel Zero	SyFy	TV	101	10/11/16
