= Bruce Connole =

American singer, songwriter, and guitarist

Bruce Connole (born November 6, 1958) is an American singer, songwriter, and guitarist. He was the lead singer for the Jetzons and several other bands based in the Southwest United States.

== Biography ==
Bruce Connole was born in Chicago, Illinois, and moved to Arizona when he was only 3 years old, and lived there for most of his life. As a young teen, he ran away from home many times, which made it difficult to complete high school. During his sophomore year he dropped out of East High School in Phoenix.

The Beatles were one of the reasons why he started practicing guitar at the age of 10.

Connole spent much of his adult music career fluctuating between times of sobriety and times of depression and drug abuse. When he was clean, he formed bands and wrote music, but when he relapsed, the bands and their momentum would typically fall apart. Of his heroin addiction, Connole commented, "Instead of having a lot of little problems, you have one big one. But it was always a handicap. It never made me play or write any better." In 1990 he hit an especially low point where he contemplated suicide, but fear of the unknown kept him from taking action.

Connole is a prolific songwriter, and considered one of Phoenix's best rock'n'pop songwriters. He writes in a variety of styles, including punk, pop, alternative, rock, and bluegrass. Connole has been a singer, guitarist, and/or songwriter for many bands, including the Jetzons, Billy Clone and the Same, the Strand, Cryptics, the Pearl Chuckers, Busted Hearts, the Revenants, and Suicide Kings. He has also recorded two solo albums with independent record label, Fervor Records.

After decades of cyclical drug use, Connole eventually reached a point of steady sobriety on his birthday of 1990 (November 6). He said quitting dope "was about as courageous as running out of a burning house. I just got to the point where I was really desperate and I wasn't dead.'"

Connole is also a computer programmer. He got his start in the field by creating the website for his band, the Revenants and using home-computer recording to demo his new material. Later he worked for sonicbox.com, a company in Silicon Valley which developed a technology that allowed listeners to access high quality internet audio. His computer job allowed him to perform and write music when he wanted to, and not because he had to pay his bills.

== Bands ==
=== Billy Clone and The Same ===
In 1978, Bruce Connole and Mike Corte, both were old highschool friends, started playing together in a garage at first, and at some point the band "Billy Clone and The Same" formed. Billy Clone and the Same was a punk rock band based in Phoenix, Arizona. The band consisted of Mike Corte (vocals), Bruce Connole (guitar), Damon Doiron (bass), and Darrell Gleason (drums). Mike played the Gibson Flying V guitar, Damon played the Fender Precision Bass, and Bruce played the Fender Stratocaster. In 1980, the band released an EP called X&Y with Moon Dog Records. Later the same year, the band broke up when lead singer, Mike Corte, died of a heroin overdose. In 2000, The Arizona Republic listed Billy Clone and The Same as No. 38 in their list of The Top 100 Best Valley Rock Bands.

=== The Jetzons ===
Probably the most famous of Connole's bands is the Jetzons. The Jetzons was a new wave band out of Phoenix, Arizona whose original members included Damon Doiron (bass), Bruce Connole (guitar and vocals), Brad Buxer (keyboard), and Steve Golladay (drums). They played their first gig on December 31, 1980, and their last in July 1983. Connole was the main songwriter for the Jetzons, and also played a red Fender Stratocaster guitar for the band, while Damon played a white Fender Precision Bass. While the Jetzons never gained much national notoriety, according to the Phoenix New Times, the Jetzons were at one point the "biggest band" in Phoenix, Arizona. In 1982, they hit their peak and were filling venues all over Arizona and California. The band struggled to gain national attention, in large part because Connole's addictions prevented the band from performing and recording, In 1982, the Jetzons released the EP Made in America, produced by Mike Condello and recorded at Cherokee Studios in Los Angeles and Warner Bros. Studios in Burbank, CA as well as Pantheon Studios in Scottsdale, AZ. The record was released on Pan American Records.

In the 1980s the city of Tempe, Arizona's musicscene was seeing a surge of many bands who were influenced by Connole, eventually coming into international prominence with the signing of many local bands to major record labels, including multi-platinum recording artist the Gin Blossoms in the early 1990s, fronted by guitarist Doug Hopkins, formerly of the Moral Majority, 1981 and later the Psalms during the early 1980s, before establishing the Gin Blossoms. The Jetzons are considered to have helped establish this music scene and The Gin Blossoms acknowledge the Jetzons as a direct influence.

Though the Jetzons was his most successful act, Connole has expressed negative feelings about the group. He is not a fan of the band's most popular track "You" which he wrote along with keyboardist Brad Buxer. Connole commented in an interview with the Phoenix New Times, "'You' is so cute and so happy. It's one of those songs that you wish you'd never written." He has also called the Jetzons an "overrated New Wave cover band," further suggesting that the music did not reflect his actual sensibilities, instead being mostly a preoccupation with what was trendy during this era. However, he has also insisted that the Jetzons and his other musical projects were sincere artistic efforts which reflected his tastes at the specific times they were made.

When the Phoenix version of the Jetzons broke up, Bruce Connole and Brad Buxer moved to Los Angeles, where they re-formed the band and added musicians, Lloyd Moffitt (bass) and Craig Romero (drums). They regained their momentum and had no problem finding an audience for their music. The Los Angeles version of the Jetzons broke up in 1986.

In 2000, the Jetzons were listed as No. 16 on the Arizona Republic's list of The 100 Best Valley Rock Bands.

In 2009, Fervor Records posted a few of the Jetzons' previously unreleased songs from the album The Complete Jetzons on YouTube. One of the songs posted, "Hard Times," was recognized by video game fans as sounding very similar to music from the " Ice Cap Zone" theme from the video game, Sonic the Hedgehog 3. This unintentionally sparked renewed interest in the controversy which claimed that Michael Jackson contributed music to the game without receiving credit. (After leaving the Jetzons, keyboardist Brad Buxer became the musical director for Michael Jackson.) Sega and Jackson denied Jackson's involvement. However, recent interviews with former Sega composers and executives suggest that fans were likely correct and Michael Jackson was involved in composing music for Sonic 3. However, in regards to the "Ice Cap Zone theme," and its similarity with the song "Hard Times," current available public records from the US Performance Rights Societies ASCAP and BMI show Buxer is listed as an ASCAP affiliated songwriter, and Connole as a BMI affiliated songwriter. ASCAP does not list Buxer as an author of the song "Hard Times." BMI lists Connole as the sole writer of "Hard Times."

=== The Strand ===
The Strand was an alternative rock band named for the Roxy Music song, "Do The Strand." They made their debut in 1987 at The Mason Jar, a nightclub and music venue in Phoenix, Arizona. The Strand was a trio which included Connole (guitar and vocals), Damon Doiron (bass) and Alan Ross Willey (drums). Connole had been struggling with heroin addiction and had moved to California when Doiron called to ask him to return to Arizona to form a new band. Buxer almost joined The Strand, but decided to remain in Los Angeles as a session musician. The Strand marketed their first cassette by making it available in limited supply to the first 250 people to buy tickets to one of their first shows. This idea was initiated by Johnny D, a disc jockey at KEYX in Phoenix. In 1986, they self-released the album, The Strand. Connole's addictive cycle eventually broke up the band.

=== Cryptics ===
The Cryptics were a classic metal band created in 1990 with Connole (guitar and vocals) Jason Huff (guitar), Mark Cady (bass), and Rick Trobman (drums). Connole commented that the music he wrote for the Cryptics came from reading Baudelaire's poetry, William Burrough's writing, the music of Ministry and Big Black, and the depths of his depression. In 1991, the Cryptics released their album Kill Me with Machine Publishing, and in 1992 they released Darker Side of You with Epiphany Records.

=== The Pearl Chuckers ===
During 1999–2000, Connole put together and performed with The Pearl Chuckers, a bluegrass side project, which consisted of artists Connole (banjo and vocals), Richard Taylor (guitar and vocals) who was later replaced by Amos Cox; Bobby Domings (drums) who was later replaced by Joe Jacques; and Ruth Wilson (bass), who was later replaced by Paul Schneider (bass).

=== Suicide Kings/The Revenants ===
The Suicide Kings are a 50s and 60s-style honky tonk/alternative-country band which has been composed of different band members over the years: Bruce Connole (lead vocals and guitar), Richard Taylor (guitar and lap steel guitar), Mike Wolfe (guitar) John Rauhouse (steel guitar), Bobby Domings (drums), Chris Olson (drums), Al Penzone (drums), Vince Ramirez (drums), Brad Buxer (keyboards), Paul Schneider (bass) and Scott Kalkbrenner (bass). The band was named for the gambler's term for the King of Hearts who holds a sword to his own head.

In the late 1990s, a punk rock'n'roll band from Los Angeles, California, also named the Suicide Kings, threatened to sue Connole's band for using their previously trademarked name. In response, Connole and his band changed their name to The Revenants. After performing for a while as The Revenants, they received a cease and desist letter from someone in Louisville who claimed he had already trademarked that name. When Connole checked both trademarks he discovered the other The Suicide Kings had let their trademark lapse. The Revenants reverted to being called The Suicide Kings, and this time applied for a trademark.

Connole stated that his decision to play Country music was a decision to follow his true instincts as a musician. Growing up in Arizona, Connole frequently heard Country music, but he took a personal interest when he was 17 and feeling sorry for himself in a drug treatment center. When he heard the music of Hank Williams, he was hooked. However, at that time in his life he found it difficult to admit to his peers that he enjoyed Country music. In the late 1980s, he taught himself to play the banjo and country guitar and wrote several songs which eventually became part of The Revenants first CD.

In 1997, the Suicide Kings released a self-titled debut CD by Rattle Records.

In 1998, The Revenants released their album, Artists and Whores, on Epiphany Records, which was produced by Clarke Rigsby. The same year, they released Jukebox Cantina Combo Platter with Hayden's Ferry Records.

In 2006, The Suicide Kings re-formed.

In 2008, The Suicide Kings released a self-titled album on Blue Plate Music, a subsidiary of John Prine's Nashville label Oh Boy Records.

In 2010, The Revenants released the album Black Cadillacs with Fervor Records.

In 2017, the Suicide Kings recorded a self-titled 7" vinyl produced by John P. Dixon and released by Ramco Records.

=== Busted Hearts ===
While The Revenants/Suicide Kings were on hiatus, Connole formed the bluegrass outfit, Busted Hearts. This band was made up of Connole (banjo, lead vocals), Keith Jackson (guitar, back-up vocals), Paul Schneider(bass), Kevin Pate (upright bass) Jason Graham (drums), Kenny Love (drums) and Amos Cox (mandolin). In 2003, Bruce Connole (and Busted Hearts) won the award of "Best Stage Shoes" from the Phoenix New Times for his black and white wingtips. In 2003, Busted Hearts opened for Connole's favorite bluegrass musician, Ralph Stanley. In 2006, the band released the album Sin, Sorrow, and Salvation with Fundamental Records.

== Solo work ==
Connole has also produced solo albums. In 2010 Fervor Records released his album Hillbilly Heroin, and in 2014, they released his album, The Narrow Road.

== Legacy ==
Additionally, Connole and former Jetzons bandmate Brad Buxer performed with Stevie Wonder on The Woman in Red soundtrack from 1984.

Connole's catalog of songs and recordings from 1982 to 2018 are controlled by independent record label Fervor Records.

== Discography ==
Artist	Title	Format	Record label	Cat#	Release date
Billy Clone & The Same	X & Y	12', vinyl	Moon Dog Records		1979
The Jetzons	Made in America		Pan American Records		1982
The Jetzons	Made in America	12", EP	Jetzons	JTZ431	1982
The Jetzons	The Complete Jetzons		Fervor Records		2008
The Jetzons	The Lost Masters	6xFile, AAC, EP, Comp, 256	Fervor Records		2013
Stevie Wonder	The Woman In Red (Soundtrack)		Motown Records		1984
Various	Jukebox Cantina Combo Platter	CD, Comp	Hayden's Ferry Records	9981	1998
The Strand	The Strand		Self-Released		1986
Cryptics	Kill Me	cassette	Machine Publishing		1991
Cryptics	Darker Side of You	Vinyl, 7", 45 RPM, Single, Stereo	Epiphany Records		1992
Suicide Kings	Suicide Kings		Rattle Records		1997
Suicide Kings	Suicide Kings	7" Vinyl	Ramco Records	EP2011	2017
Suicide Kings	Suicide Kings	Album	Blue Plate Music	BPM600	September 26, 2008
The Revenants	Artists and Whores	CD, Album	Epiphany Records	EP1019	1998
The Busted Hearts	Sin, Sorrow, and Salvation	CDr, Album	Fundamental Records		2006
The Revenants	Black Cadillacs	EP	Fervor Records		2010
Bruce Connole	Hillbilly Heroin		Fervor Records		2010
Bruce Connole	The Narrow Road		Fervor Records		2014

== TV and film ==
Artist	Song title	Program Title	Episode	Channel/Source	Format	Air Date
Billy Clone and the Same	"She's So Primitive"	Mindhunter	1	SVOD	Netflix	10/13/2017
Suicide Kings	"Why Do You Love Me"	Billy Lynn's Long Halftime Walk		Film	Sony Pictures	11/18/2016
The Strand	"Her Love's In Vain"	Red Oaks	210	SVOD	Amazon	11/11/2016
The Jetzons	Hard Times	Fairly Legal	207	TV	USA	4/27/2012
The Jetzons	Hard Times	Red Oaks	104	SVOD	Amazon	10/9/2015
The Jetzons	Hard Times	The Middle	610	TV	ABC	1/7/2015
The Jetzons	Hard Times	The Americans	511	TV	FX	5/16/2017
The Jetzons	Won't Wait No More	How to Live with Your Parents	108	TV	ABC	5/22/2013
The Jetzons	Won't Wait No More	Hung		TV	HBO	
The Jetzons	I Love You	Parenthood	312	TV	NBC	1/3/2012
The Jetzons	I Love You	Red Oaks	210	SVOD	Amazon	11/11/2016
The Jetzons	I Love You	Mindhunter	101	SVOD	Netflix	10/13/2017
The Jetzons	When the Sun Goes Down	Parks and Recreation	418	TV	NBC	2/23/2012
The Jetzons	When the Sun Goes Down	Parks and Recreation	406	TV	NBC	10/3/2011
The Jetzons	When the Sun Goes Down	Haters Back Off	204	SVOD	Netflix	10/20/2017
The Jetzons	When the Sun Goes Down	Stranger Things	205	SVOD	Netflix	10/27/2017
The Jetzons	4-3-1	Red Oaks	101	SVOD	Amazon	10/9/2015
The Jetzons	4-3-1	Red Oaks	pilot	SVOD	Amazon	8/28/2014
The Jetzons	4-3-1	The Americans	304	TV	FX	2/18/2015
The Jetzons	4-3-1	Glow	103	SVOD	Netflix	6/23/2017
The Jetzons	She Has Won	Halt & Catch Fire	307	TV	AMC	9/27/2016
The Jetzons	She Has Won	The Americans	513	TV	FX	5/30/2017
The Jetzons	Angel	Glow	109	SVOD	Netflix	6/23/2017
The Jetzons	I Can't Sleep At Night	Red Oaks	303	SVOD	Amazon	10/20/2017
The Revenants	Suicide King	Justified	110	TV	FX	5/18/2010
The Revenants	Suicide King	The Most Hated Woman in America		SVOD	Netflix	3/24/2017
The Revenants	Suicide King	El Camino Christmas		Film	Netflix	12/9/2017
The Revenants	Cradle to the Grave	Savage County		TV	MTV2	10/1/2010
The Revenants	One More Lonely Night	Laid in America		Film	Independent	9/26/2016
The Revenants	Cold Winter's Night	Bellevue	106	TV	CBC	3/27/2017
Cryptics	Forever After	Banshee	304	TV	Cinemax	1/30/2015
Cryptics	Blood on the Floor	Dice	101	TV	Showtime	5/1/2016
Cryptics	I Don't Care	Justified	502	TV	FX	1/14/2014
Cryptics	I Don't Care	Countdown		Other	WWE Studios	4/5/2016
Bruce Connole	Nicotine Breakdown	The Dudesons in America	105	TV	MTV2	7/23/2010
Bruce Connole	I Walk the Night	Vice	404	TV	HBO	2/26/2016
Bruce Connole	Can't Find My Way	World of Jenks	202	TV	MTV	3/11/2013
