= Wild Whirled Music =

American independent music publisher

- Type: Private
- Founded: 2002
- Headquarters: Phoenix, Arizona
- Website: http://www.wildwhirled.com/

Wild Whirled Music is an American independent music publisher. The company's core business evolved from placement of songs in popular US television shows and films. David Hilker is CEO, and Jeff Freundlich is COO.

== History ==
The company took its name from the recording studio of songwriting/production team John Costello III and David Hilker. Wild Whirled Recording originally opened in 1990. Costello and Hilker had written, produced, and engineered projects for various clientele including DJ Z-Trip, Kristine W, Glen Campbell Music, Robert Kiyosaki, Caroline Records, Fox Family Channel, Fox Kids cartoons, ABC Family, Michael Shenker, Keel (band), MasterSource Music Catalog, Network Music, OneMusic, The Hollywood Edge, Oregon Catholic Press, FirstCom Music, and KTVK.

After producing projects for several TV networks, music libraries and music publishers, Costello and Hilker desired broader creative latitude and additional outlets for their music. In 2002, they teamed up with New York City native Jeff Freundlich, and changed their moniker to Wild Whirled Music.

== Publishing divisions ==
Wild Whirled Music administers rights to several publishing catalogs including Mount Pilot Music Publishing, Music Whirled Publishing, Ultra Urban Music, Trailerville Music, Cue Sheet Music, Two Skullz Muzik, Mighty Music, Vintage Masters Music, Earthcake Publishing, BIGBUZZ Music, Desert Palms Music and Renda Music. The collective companies represent over 160 songwriters and composers worldwide.

== Distribution ==
Wild Whirled Music's content is marketed under Wild Whirled Music Catalog, Trailerville Music, Muzik Headz, and Fervor Records. They are distributed in North America by Whirled Music Publishing and Los Angeles based 7 Out Music.

In 2005, the company expanded internationally into Italy with sub-publisher Villasara Music House.

In 2007, Sony/ATV Music Publishing France was added for the territory of France and Belgium.

In 2008, Musou Music was added for the territory of Greece, Boosey & Hawkes was added for the territories of the United Kingdom, and Audio Factory, GMBH was added for the territories of Germany, Austria, and Switzerland.

== Record labels ==
Wild Whirled Music represents Phoenix, AZ based independent record label Fervor Records.
