= Comstock Records =

American record label

- Founded: 1978
- Founder: Frank Fara, Patty Parker
- Genre: Country
- Country of origin: U.S.
- Location: Nashville, Tennessee

Comstock Records is an independent American record label. Established and managed by Frank Fara and Patty Parker, Comstock achieved international success in the 1980s and 1990s by producing country music records for international artists. Several Comstock artists charted nationally and internationally, and many were nominated for Country Music awards.

== Founders ==
Co-founder Frank Fara grew up in Phoenix, Arizona. Under his birth name, Frank Fafara, he enjoyed a brief recording career as a Teen Idol in the early 1960s and had several regional hits. His first recording "Only in My Dreams" went to number #5 on the Phoenix Top Ten radio charts. His song was given a B+ from Cashbox magazine, and Billboard magazine gave him a three star rating He made frequent appearances at the Phoenix Rock'n Roll club, Stage 7, and opened for artists such as Conway Twitty, Del Shannon and the Everly Brothers. He was also regularly featured on the local TV shows Teen Beat and The Wallace and Ladmo Show. As an adult he changed his last name to Fara and moved to California, where he started a country music band which began touring as The Frank Fara Show.

Co-Founder Patty Parker grew up Shawnee, Kansas. In college she earned her degree in music education and toured with the John Brown University vocal gospel ensemble The Harmonaires. After college she worked for three years as a music teacher but moved to California to pursue her dream of becoming a singer. In California, Parker met Fara and she began singing and playing the drums in their traveling road show. When audiences reacted enthusiastically to her performances, the band renamed the show, The Frank Fara Show featuring Patty Parker. Parker later performed as a background vocalist for hundreds of Nashville recordings.

== History ==
In the mid 1970s Fara and Parker toured the Nevada casino circuit and major venues across the US and Canada. Each time they visited a city, their first stop was to the local radio station where they presented their latest single release. Over time, they visited hundreds of DJs and radio stations and as a result, their music was played on radio stations across North America.

Fara and Parker married, and after five years of touring, they transitioned out of the road show and into the record business. While creating their own album, Parker discovered she preferred time in the studio over a life of touring. The couple launched Comstock Records in 1978 and named the company after the Comstock Lode, a gold and silver mine in Virginia City, Nevada.

Parker became Comstock's producer and Fara focused on marketing and promotions. Parker was one of Nashville's first female Independent Country music producers.

In 1988 Comstock moved its studio to Scottsdale, Arizona but continued to provide the same production and promotion services.

Comstock formed a subsidiary label, Paylode, which featured adult contemporary and pop artists, and two publishing companies White Cat (ASCAP) and Rocky Bell (BMI).

== European interest ==
Comstock Records discovered that artists in Canada and Europe were interested in recording Country music songs. To the artists Comstock accepted - typically professional singers who had not been accepted by major labels-Comstock offered a recording service which included rehearsal, two original songs produced by Parker, an authentic Nashville band, a recording session in a top Nashville studio, and the promise to distribute their songs to music critics and international radio stations.

Many of these artists wanted to sing like American Country music stars and requested coaching to perfect their dialect. To help artists pronounce words, Parker would often write song lyrics phonetically and provide audio tapes illustrating the country-western way of enunciating.

Comstock produced artists from Australia, Canada, Croatia, Ireland, Sweden, the USA, and elsewhere.

== Successful artists ==
Comstock's first artist, Alex Fraser, achieved immediate success with his album Four States to Go which hit #9 on the Canadian Country charts. Due to his album's success, he received nominations, appearances on TV shows, and a national distribution deal.

The O'Roark Brothers had three singles make the U.S. Country charts, "Long Time Comin,'" "A Woman Like You" and "You're Going Out of My Mind." In 1980 they were chosen to appear on the Music City News Cover Awards Show in Nashville.

In October 1984, Billie J. Helmkay reached number 88 on the Cash Box Top 100 Country Singles chart with the song, "You're Spreadin' My Hurt Around." This song was also listed under the "Recommended" Country section of the October 1984 Billboard Singles Reviews. She also made a TV appearance on the show Big Sky Country.

In the mid-1980s Anne Lord won three Danny Molson Awards (Vancouver, British Columbia) for Female Vocalist of the Year and a Horizon Award for most notable newcomer. She received six Canadian Country Music Award nominations, and in 1984 was nominated for a Juno Award for Best Country Female Vocalist. Her song "Nobody Said" reached #26 on the Australian top 40 charts, and received airplay on stations in Britain, Holland, France and Germany.

Inger Nordstrom and Her Rhinestone Band received a nomination for a music award in Nashville, and earned the Critic's Choice Pick of the Week from Billboard Magazine. in 1991 she won Scandinavian Album of the Year with her record Cimarron County. In both 1992 and 1993, she and her band were named Scandinavian Country Performer of the Year. Their single "I Saw You Look At Her" peaked at #5 on the Indie Bullet Chart. Inger also hosted her own country music show on Swedish radio.

Thirteen Comstock Artists made the Nashville Top 40 Indie World charts, 31 Comstock artists made the Top 50 charts in the European Country Music Association (ECMA), and 24 Comstock acts made New York's Music Review National Top 30 charts.

== Awards and honors ==
In 1985 Comstock earned ten nominations from the Canadian Country Music Association, including one for Record Company of the Year.

In 1986, five Comstock records made the Cash Box Top 100.

In 1998 Comstock was awarded Indie Label of the Year in Europe by the ECMA.

Several Comstock produced videos found frequent rotation on Country Music Television and The Nashville Network.

In 1986, Fara wrote the book How to Open Doors in the Music Industry the Independent Way. Parker contributed a chapter called "The Producer."

== Legacy ==
Much of the Comstock catalog now resides with Fervor Records, which has placed many of their songs in TV and film.

== Discography ==
Artist	Album	Format	Cat #	Country	Release date
The Steeles	Faith/My Happiness	7"	1630		1976
Frank Fara/Patty Parker	Frank Fara/Patty Parker	LP	COM 977	US	1977
Alex Fraser	Midnight Star/Devils Oval	7", Single, Promo, 45 RPM	COM 1634	US	1979
Alla Dee Franklin	Garage Sale	7", Single, Promo	COM 1636	US	1979
The O'Roark Brothers	Long Time Comin'	LP, Album	COM 980	US	1982
The O'Roark Brothers	Long Time Comin'	7", Single, Promo	COM 1641	US	1980
The O'Roark Brothers	Under the Double Nickel	7", Single, Promo	COM 1647	US	1980
Ray Lansbery	Heartache Remover	7", Vinyl, 45 RPM	COM 1655	US	1981
Bob Jones	Woman Unsatisfied/She's Not a Fallen Angel	7", Single	COM 1671	US	1981
Don TeBeaux	A Part of Me	LP, Album	COM-982	US	1982
Don TeBeaux	Christmas Without You/To Love My Woman More	7", Single, Vinyl, 45 RPM	COM 1694	US	1982
Don TeBeaux	Put Me in My Place/ A Part of Me	7", Single, 45 RPM, Vinyl	COM 1735	US	1984
Buddi Day	Lovin' Time of Night	7", Single, Vinyl	COM 1684	US	1982
Buddi Day	The Last Desperado	7", Single, Vinyl	COM 1696	US	1982
Debbie Martin	Moments of Love/The Price I Pay (For Loving You Again)	7", Single, Vinyl, 45 RPM	COM 1675	US	1982
Bill Hersh	Babysittin' with the Blues/Curly's Theme	7", Vinyl, 45 RPM	COM 1710	US	1983
Don Malena	New Shade of Blue	7" Single, Vinyl, 45 RPM	COM 1753	US	1984
Don Malena	I've Been Down	7", Single, Vinyl, 45 RPM	COM 1762	US	1984
Don Malena	I'm Not Tough Enough (To Fall in Love Again)	7", Single, Vinyl, 45 RPM	COM 1775		1985
Don Malena	Lightning	7", Single, Vinyl, 45 RPM	COM 1784	US	1985
Don Malena	One More Night	7', Single	COM 1793		1985
Lee Mahony	Freedom is Only Another Word for Lonely/One Good Turn	7", Vinyl	COM 1727 A	US	1983
Reg Watkins & Lori Kristin	Oklahoma Memory	7", Vinyl, 45 RPM	COM-1704 B	US	1983
Reg Watkins & Lori Kristin	Stop and Think It Over	7"	COM 1734	US	1983
Anne Lord	Endlessly	7"	COM 1717		1983
Anne Lord	Stars in My Eyes				1985
Anne Lord	Blue Rain		COM 1923		1989
Peter Chipman	For All Those Years/She Can Survive	7", Vinyl, 45 RPM	COM 1781	US & Canada	1984
Pegasus	More Than a Friend/Last Chance Saloon	7", Vinyl, 45 RPM	COM 1773	US	1985
Sherry Ann	Don't Waste Your Love On Her Tonight	7", Vinyl, Single	COM 1792	US	1985
Billie J. Helmkay	Nothing Could Ever Be the Same				1985
Alibi	Til The Fire's Burned Out	7", Vinyl, 45 RPM	COM 1813	US	1986
Alibi	No Doubts	CD, Album	COM 1884	Canada	unknown
Priscilla Wright	Words on the Wire	Vinyl, 7", 45 RPM, Single	COM 1801	US	1986
Priscilla Wright	God Bless You Baby	7", Single	COM 1983	US	1990
Rick Harrelson	Lovin' You Like This	Vinyl, 7"	COM 1827	US	1986
Rae Palmer	Call Me Up	Vinyl, 7"	COM 1830	US	1986
RJ McClintock	When Two Hearts Speak (You Just Can't Stop The Feeling)	7"	COM 1836	US	1987
Fred Brown	Please Handle with Care	7"	COM 1870	US	1987
Johnny Ramone	Where Did I Go Right	7", Single	COM 1911	US	1988
James Edward Holmes	I Got Your Memory on the Line	7", Single	COM 1920-A	US	1989
John Lindsey	Am I the Only One		COM1922		1989
Rodney Young	Bad Habits	7", Single	COM 1985	US	1990
The Crosby's	Hit & Run	7", Single	COM 1980	US	1990
Thomas E Thomas	The Mighty Buffalo	Vinyl, 7", 45 RPM, Limited Edition, Stereo	COM 2038	US	1990
Jess Owen	Remember Me	Vinyl, 7", 45 RPM	NR-1992-A	US	1990
Stoker Brothers	Dance a Little Closer/Dance a Little Closer		COM 1981		1990
Stoker Brothers	Love on the Run	Vinyl, 7", Single, Promo	COM 2027	US	1991
The Roberts Sisters	Daddy Was a Lawman	7", Single	COM 2008	US	1991
Ray Dean James	When All the Trains Are Gone	7", Single	COM 2011	US	1991
Debbie Baker	Send Me a Picture	Vinyl, 7", 45 RPM, Single	COM 2014	US	1991
Jodie Sinclair	I Can't Help Feelin' Crazy	Vinyl, 7", 45 RPM, Single	COM 2016	US	1991
White Canyon	Our Love's Not Perfect	7", Single	COM 2017	US	1991
Jeff Southern	Highway to Heaven	7", Single	COM 2019	US	1991
Colin Clark	The Price for Loving You	7", Single	COM 2021	US	1991
Colin Clark	Boogie Woogie Thang	Vinyl, 7", Single	COM 2093	US	1993
Dusty Martin	Ain't Nothin Been the Same	Vinyl, 7", 45 RPM	COM 2103	US	1993
Horst Krush	Portrait of a Cowboy	7", Single	COM 2022	US	1991
Jess Owen	Big Boys Don't Cry	7", Single	COM 2023	US	1991
Double Gage	Car Singer	Vinyl, 7", 45 RPM	COM 2058	US	1992
Gregg Weaver	The Stars Disappear with the Rising Sun	Vinyl, 7", Single	COM 2091	US	1993
Claudia	I Can Tell	Vinyl, 7", Single	COM 2092	US	1993
Sophie Stillman	He Don't Love Me With His Eyes/That's The Only Gold	Vinyl, 7", 45 RPM, Single	COM 2110	US	1994
Arizona Trilogy	Song of the Grand Canyon	CD, Single	COM-&16-CDS	US	1994
Abby & Johnny	Crossing the Pond	CD, Album, Comp. Stereo	COM-1001-CD	US	1994
Cindy Stines	Watch and Pray	CD, Single	COM1013-CDS	Europe	1995
Christopher Lee Clayton	Livin'Alone Together/The Folks Across the Street	CD, Single	COM 1022-CDS	US	1996
Various Artists	Comstock Records International Country Music Sampler Summer 1996		COM SM96		1996
Atlantic Freeway	The Grind of Your Heel/Makin' Love With You	CD, Single	COM 1030-CDS	Europe	1997
Atlantic Freeway	Shine/Baby You're A Bad Idea	CD, Single	COM 1036-CDS	Europe	1997
Howdy	Still Straight	CD, Album	COM 3141	US	1999
Frank Fafara	Only in My Dreams	CD, Remastered		US	2006
Frank Fara (Fafara)	Charming Billy, Billy the Kid	Single			2006
Frank Fara (Fafara)	Songs of the Untamed West			US	2008
Frank Fara (Fafara)	Custer's Last Command	Single		US	2010
Frank Fara (Fafara)	Tombstone Legacy	Single		US	2014
Frank Fara (Fafara)	Ride with Pancho Villa	Single		US	2014
Patty Parker	La Noche Buena, It's Christmas Eve	Single		US	2005
Patty Parker	Southwestern Serenade	CD		US	2007
Patty Parker	Song of the Grand Canyon	Single		US	2010
Patty Parker	Hotel Saguaro	Single		US	2014
Scheibee & Foosen	News For You	CD, Album, Super Jewel Case	SFCR-092708-CD	US	2009
Rick Greysun	Jesus Came with Music/I Just Cry Unto You Lord	7", Single	COM-1639	US	unknown
Gary Kirkland	Heartful of Love/Are You from Dixie	7"	COM 1858		unknown

== Film and television ==
Artist	Song	Show title	Channel	Program type	Episode	Release date
Billie J. Helmkay	"You"re Spreading My Hurt Around"	Red Oaks	Amazon	TV	205	11/11/16
Frank Fafara	"Only In My Dreams'	11-22-63	Hulu	SVOD	104	2/29/16
Frank Fafara	"Only In My Dreams'	Durham County	Global Television Network/ Ion Television			4/1/2010
Frank Fafara	"Only In My Dreams'	The Good Wife	CBS	TV	514	3/16/2014
Frank Fafara	"Only In My Dreams'	The Pretty One	Provenance Pictures	Film	na	4/20/2013
Frank Fafara	"Only In My Dreams'	Bates Motel	A&E	TV	501	2/20/2017
Frank Fafara	"Lovemaker/Lovebreaker"	American Horror Story	FX	TV	201	2/29/2016
Frank Fafara	"Lovemaker/Lovebreaker"	iZombie	CW	TV	313	6/20/2017
Frank Fafara	"A Tear Has Taken Your Place"	Girls	HBO	TV	503	3/6/2013
Bob Jones	"Woman Unsatisfied"	Claws	TNT	TV	105	7/17/17
Bob Jones	"Woman Unsatisfied"	The Americans	FX	TV	504	3/28/17
Bobbie Bowlin	"Trying to Be an Outlaw"	Red Oaks	Amazon	TV	306	10/20/17
Debbie Martin	"Moments of Love"	King of the Road	Viceland	TV	203	5/9/17
Gale Wahl	"The Hard Times All Over Again"	Channel Zero	SyFy	TV	102	10/18/16
Gina Samuels	"Lonely Hearts Lover"	Red Oaks	Amazon	TV	207	11/11/16
Kathy Tate	"I Am Your Lady"	Get Hard	na	Film		2015
Mitch Clark	"Close Your Eyes and Count to Ten"	Red Oaks	Amazon	TV	205	11/11/16
Mitch Clark	"Close Your Eyes and Count to Ten"	The Americans	FX	TV	304	11/11/16
Patty Parker	"Help You Find a Way"	Preacher	AMC	TV	105	6/26/16
Ray Lansberry	"Heartache Remover"	Claws	TNT	TV	107	7/23/17
Susan Doll	"Be My Cowboy Tonight"	Preacher	AMC	TV	107	7/10/16
Susan Doll	"Be My Cowboy Tonight"	Channel Zero	SyFy	TV	101	10/11/16
