= Frank Fafara =

American singer

Frank Fafara (a.k.a. Frank Fara) was a teen rocker in the late 1950s and early 1960s in Phoenix, Arizona where he achieved regional fame. As an adult he changed his last name to "Fara" and toured across North America with his Country music road show, The Frank Fara Show featuring Patty Parker. After touring for five years, he and Parker married and founded Comstock Records, an independent American record label.

== Teen Idol ==
In the late 1950s, Frank and his school friend and lead guitarist, Richard Meyer, started out playing for high school rallies. Their popularity soon came to the attention of Arizona Republic music columnist Jack Curtis, who set up their first recording session. The original recording included Richard Meyer on lead guitar, Jim Schultz on drums, Frank on rhythm guitar, and Al Casey on bass.

Fafara had a string of successful Rock ‘n Roll releases in Arizona from 1959 to 1964. His first recording, “Only in My Dreams” went to #5 on the Phoenix Top Ten radio charts. A series of releases followed including “Miss You Dee”, “Lovemaker, Lovebreaker” and “Golden One”. Frank Fafara recorded at the same studio as Duane Eddy, Waylon Jennings, Sanford Clark, and Wayne Newton. Cashbox's national review noted that “Fafara has something of the late Buddy Holly in his light beat delivery”. Billboard Magazine gave him their highest 3 star rating.

Frank Fafara performed shows across Arizona with other top rockers of his day including the Everly Brothers, Conway Twitty, Brenda Lee and Del Shannon. He also appeared regularly at Stage 7, a popular Phoenix teen club. Frank appeared as a regular on KPHO's Saturday night TV show Teen Beat, as well as performing on The Wallace and Ladmo Show. On television, Frank was usually backed up by lead guitarist Mike Condello & the Stage 7 combo, while other shows normally featured Bob Knisley or Fred Allard on lead guitar.

== The Frank Fara Show featuring Patty Parker ==
As an adult, Fafara changed his last name to "Fara" and moved to California, where he put together a country music road show. The band was originally named The Frank Fara Show, but due to his drummer's (Patty Parker) popularity and charismatic stage presence, they changed the name to The Frank Fara Show featuring Patty Parker. For five years, Fara and Parker toured the Nevada casino circuit and major venues across North America. They eventually married, stopped touring, and began working behind the scenes in the studio.

== Co-Founder of Comstock Records ==
In 1978, Fara and Parker founded Comstock Records, an independent American record label. Fara was responsible for marketing and promotions, and Parker was the producer. Their office was originally located in Shawnee, Kansas, but they used Nashville studios and Nashville musicians to record and produce their songs. Parker was one of the first female independent Country music producers in the nation. Comstock found their niche in the music business by producing Country music albums for international artists. In 1988, Comstock Records moved their office to Scottsdale, Arizona, but continued to produce and record in Nashville. In the 1980s and 1990s, Comstock's success caught the attention of Billboard, The Wall Street Journal, and many local newspapers across North America. In 1998, after two decades of achieving charting success and international music awards, the ECMA awarded Comstock Records "Indie Label of the Year."

In 1986, Fara wrote the book, How to Open Doors in the Music Industry the Independent Way.

== Legacy ==
In the 2000s, Fafara's masters were found at Audio Recorders, the studio which made Phoenix a major recording hub during the fifties & sixties. Frank wrote all of his own songs and they were put out on MCI Records and Mascot Records. The songs were leased to Del-Fi Records, the same label as Richie Valens, but were never released nationally. In 2006, all the original Phoenix recordings from 1959 - 1964 of Fafara were completely digitized and released by Comstock Records on a CD titled Only In My Dreams.

Much of Fara's and Comstock's catalog resides with independent record label, Fervor Records, which has placed many of his songs in TV and film.

== Discography ==
Artist	Album	Format	Record label	Cat #	Release date
Frank Fafara	Only In My Dreams	7", Single	MCI Records	1022	1959
Frank Fafara	Only In My Dreams	CD, Remastered	Comstock Records		2006
	Mascot Records Retrospective, Vol. 2		Fervor Records		2013
Various	Deep Cuts & B Sides: Teen Idols, Vol. 1		Fervor Records		2015
Various	Deep Cuts & B Sides: Teen Idols, Vol. 2		Fervor Records		2015
Various	Grand Theft Auto Vice City Official Soundtrack Box Set	7xCD, Compilation	Epic, Rockstar Games	5100642000	2002
Various	Grand Theft Auto Vice City Official Soundtrack Box Set	7xCD, Compilation, Enh+Box	Epic, Rockstar Games	EXK-87009	2002
Frank Fara	Ride With Pancho Villa	Single	Comstock Records		2014
Frank Fara	Songs of the Untamed West	CD	Comstock Records		2008
Frank Fara	Charming Billy, Billy the Kid	Single	Comstock Records		2006
Frank Fara	Custer's Last Command	Single	Comstock Records		2010
Frank Fara	Tombstone Legacy	Single	How the West Was Sung BMI		2014

== TV and Film Placements ==
Composer	Performing Artist	Song title	Program	Format	Network	Episode	Release date
Frank Fafara	Frank Fafara	'Only in My Dreams"	11-22-63	SVOD	Hulu	104	2/29/16
Frank Fafara	Frank Fafara	'Only in My Dreams"	Durham County	TV	Global Television Network/ Ion Television		4/1/2010
Frank Fafara	Frank Fafara	'Only in My Dreams"	The Good Wife	TV	CBS	514	3/16/2014
Frank Fafara	Frank Fafara	'Only in My Dreams"	The Pretty One	Film	Provenance Pictures	na	4/20/2013
Frank Fafara	Frank Fafara	'Only in My Dreams"	Bates Motel	TV	A&E	501	2/20/2017
Frank Fafara	Frank Fafara	"Lovemaker/Lovebreaker"	American Horror Story	TV	FX	201	2/29/2016
Frank Fafara	Frank Fafara	"Lovemaker/Lovebreaker"	iZombie	TV	CW	313	6/20/2017
Frank Fafara	Frank Fafara	"A Tear Has Taken Your Place"	Girls	TV	HBO	503	3/6/2016
Frank Fafara	Jim Boyd	"You Only Want Me When You're Lonely"	11-22-63		Hulu	107	3/21/2016
Frank Fafara	Jim Boyd	"Don't Ask For More'	Homeland	TV	Showtime	302	10/6/2013
Frank Fafara	Jim Boyd	"Don't Ask For More'	Van Helsing	TV	SyFy	201	10/5/2017
Frank Fafara	Nancy Barry	"Don't Take Me For Granted"	Staten Island Summer	Film	Paramount Pictures	na	6/30/2015
Frank Fafara	Nancy Barry	"Don't Take Me For Granted"	Whatever Linda	SVOD		101	10/1/2014
Frank Fafara	Nancy Barry	"Don't Take Me For Granted"	Preacher	TV	AMC	Pilot	5/22/2106
Frank Fafara	Nancy Barry	"Don't Take Me For Granted"	Leatherface	Film	Lionsgate	na	10/20/2017
Frank Fafara	Patty Parker	"Help You Find a Way"	Preacher	TV	AMC	105	6/26/2016
