= Jeff Freundlich =

American musician

Jeff Freundlich is an American songwriter, producer and music industry executive. His music is heard in network, cable and syndicated TV shows, in major and independent films, and advertising campaigns.

A native of New York City, Freundlich graduated cum laude from Lehigh University in Bethlehem, Pennsylvania, in 1998. Freundlich served as an analyst at Andersen Consulting (now called Accenture) from 1998–1999, he was a Marketing Manager for Net2Phone in Hackensack, New Jersey, from 1999–2002.

In 2002, Freundlich teamed with David Hilker and John Costello III, the owners of Phoenix, AZ recording studio, Wild Whirled Recording. The team formed Wild Whirled Music, which licenses copyrighted music content to all forms of electronic media. Wild Whirled Music represents Wild Whirled Music Catalog, Trailerville Music, Muzik Headz and independent label Fervor Records.

Freundlich serves as COO for Wild Whirled Music, Muzik Headz, and Executive Producer for Fervor Records. All companies are based in, Phoenix, AZ. Wild Whirled currently oversees the music publishing assets of the following catalogs:

- Music Whirled Publishing, Inc., BMI
- Mount Pilot Music Publishing, BMI
- Mighty Music, BMI
- Renda Music, BMI
- Desert Palm, BMI
- Trailerville Music, BMI
- Cue Sheet Music, BMI
- Earthcake Publishing, BMI
- BIGBUZZ Music, BMI
- Ultra Urban Music, ASCAP
- Two Skullz Muzik Publishing, ASCAP
- Vintage Masters Music, ASCAP

== Distribution ==
Publishing catalogs are distributed internationally by:

- Villasara Music House Italy
- Sony/ATV Music Publishing France & Belgium
- Musou Music Greece
- Boosey & Hawkes, UK
- Audio Factory, GMBH, Germany, Austria and Switzerland
- Wild Whirled Music, North America
- 7 Out Music, North America

== Select discography as writer, performer and producer ==
- Pure House - 2 da Groove, Fervor Records (2007) - writer
- Nu R&B - Various Artists, Fervor Records (2007) - writer
- Fervor Divas Sing The Ballads - Various Artists, Fervor Records (2007) - writer, producer
- Howell/Freundlich Overdrive - self-titled, Fervor Records (2008) - writer, producer, vocalist
- Change We Can Believe In - Juice Monkey, Fervor Records (2008) - writer, producer, vocalist
- Greatest Hits of the 70s - Smooth Double J, Fervor Records (2008) - writer, producer, vocalist
- Christmas Fervor - Various Artists, Fervor Records (2008) - writer, producer, vocalist
- 1st Collection - Brill Street Collective, Fervor Records (2009) - writer, producer, vocalist, percussionist
- Suicide Machine - Kaige & the Pubes, Fervor Records (2009) - writer, producer, vocalist

== Notable credits ==
Freundlich has placed music with shows on every major USA TV network including: A&E Network, ABC Television, ABC Family, AMC, Animal Planet, Bravo, CBS, CHUM Limited, Comedy Central, CTV Television Network, Discovery Channel, Discovery Health Channel, Disney, E!, Fit TV, Fox, FSN, Fuel, FX, Global Television Network, Hallmark Channel, HBO, HGTV, Lifetime Television, MTV, MTV2, NBC, Noggin, Oxygen, Playboy, Sci Fi Channel, Showtime, Soap Opera Network, SPEED, Spike, Style Network, Starz, TBS, Tech TV, The CW, The WB, TLC, Turner Network Television, Travel Channel, Univision, UPN, USA Network, VH1 and WE tv.

=== ABC ===
- Ugly Betty
- Brothers & Sisters
- Boston Legal
- Men In Trees
- In Case of Emergency
- Freddie
- George Lopez
- Rodney
- The Drew Carey Show
- Good Morning America

=== CBS ===
- The Mentalist
- Numb3rs
- Big Brother
- Flashpoint
- Without A Trace
- Criminal Minds
- Cold Case
- CSI: Miami
- CSI: NY
- Navy NCIS
- The Unit
- Ghost Whisperer
- JAG
- The Handler

=== NBC ===
- Southland
- The Listener
- My Name Is Earl
- The Office
- Las Vegas
- Crossing Jordan
- Surface
- Law & Order
- Law & Order: SVU
- Law & Order: CI
- E-Ring
- ER
- Scrubs
- Friends
- Medical Investigation

=== Fox ===
- House
- Standoff
- Vanished
- Reunion
- The War at Home
- King of the Hill
- The Simple Life
- Fox NFL Sunday
- Malcolm In The Middle

=== The CW ===
- America's Next Top Model
- Supernatural
- Valentine
- Reaper
- Easy Money
- Everybody Hates Chris
- Gilmore Girls
- Veronica Mars
- Smallville
- One Tree Hill
- Crazy Ex-Girlfriend

=== HBO ===
- The Sopranos
- Big Love
- Empire Falls

=== Oxygen ===
- Bad Girls Road Trip

=== TLC ===
- Miami Ink
- LA Ink

=== TV themes ===
- Build Or Bust Speed Channel
- The Chris Myers Interview, FSN
- Arena Football League, FSN
- Total Access 24/7, ABC Family
- Mark Henry's 8th theme WWE
- Brainstorm, KTVK

=== Films ===
- The Silencing
- Preacher's Kid
- Paul Blart Mall Cop
- The Love Guru
- The Messenger
- I Love You Man
- She's Out Of My League
- The Private Lives of Pippa Lee
- Sex Drive
- The Answer Man
- All About Steve
- The Six Wives of Henry Lefay
- Greta
- A Dog Year
- Midgets Vs. Mascots
- AMREEKA
- Meet Monica Velour
- Happy Tears
- The Lost Coast
- Nancy Drew
- Eragon
- I Think I Love My Wife
- Phat Girlz
- The Saloon
- Everyday People
- Harold & Kumar Go to White Castle
- American Wedding
- Surviving Christmas
- August Rush
- Kickin' It Old Skool
- Broken English
- Species: The Awakening
- Wieners
- Byline
- DOA: Dead Or Alive
- Thought Crimes
- Butterfly Effect 2
- Her Best Move
- Harsh Times
- Vegas Baby
- Wasabi Tuna
- Latin Dragon
- Road Trip: 24 Hours In Vegas
- Bathgate Avenue
- Nora's Hair Salon
- The Dying Gaul
