= Fervor Records =

- Founded: 1989; 37 years ago
- Founder: David Hilker, Ted Bulger, Ron Pick, Michael Charlesworth
- Country of origin: U.S.
- Location: Phoenix, Arizona
- Official website: fervor-records.com

Fervor Records is an American independent record label based in Phoenix, Arizona. The company was founded in 1989 and is owned and operated by David Hilker and Jeff Freundlich. The label creates compilations of previously released and unreleased music, reissues original albums and singles, and releases music from heritage and contemporary artists across numerous genres. The catalog includes many Billboard charting songs as well as major label, Hall of Fame, and Grammy Award-winning artists. Fervor licenses music to television shows, films, advertising, and other media applications. The label releases limited physical product on CD, cassette, vinyl, and has products available on digital platforms worldwide.

== History ==
=== Formation ===
Fervor Records was founded in 1989 in Phoenix, Arizona by entrepreneurs David Hilker, Ted Bulger, Ron Pick and Michael Charlesworth as a subsidiary to Wild Whirled Music Group which also included Mount Pilot Music Publishing Company, BMI. The company was first headquartered in an office/warehouse space on Gelding Drive in the Scottsdale Airpark in Scottsdale, Arizona.

=== First release ===
From their offices in Scottsdale, the fledgling company produced the first charity Christmas compilation in Arizona, which sold over 4,000 copies in six weeks. The disc, Southwest Holiday benefited Central Arizona Shelter Services, a homeless shelter in Phoenix. "Our goal," said Hilker, "was to unite the music community and do something positive."

=== Move to Sunnyslope ===
In 1991, Hilker and his songwriting/production partner, John Costello, opened a recording studio, Wild Whirled Recording, at 600 West Dunlap Avenue in the Sunnyslope neighborhood of Phoenix. It was in a strip mall next to a laundromat. This address also served as Fervor's new headquarters. The studio serviced many client recording sessions. Hilker and Costello also produced a variety of singers and rappers focused primarily on hip-hop and R&B.

=== Other early releases ===
Fervor achieved local success with three additional compilation releases: Arizona Unplugged, Blue Saguaro, and Musicians for St. Mary's (a second charity release, this one for St. Mary's Food Bank in Phoenix). Artists appearing on these albums include Jeff Dayton, The Phoenix Boys Choir, Hans Olson, Brian Page & The Next, Cliff Sarde, genepool, Sonya Jason, J. David Sloan and Billy Williams, Bob Corritore, Chico Chism, Big Pete Pearson, The Rocket 88's, Sam Taylor, Scotty Spenner, Chief Gillame, Rena Haus, Buddy Reed and the Rip It Ups, The Hoodoo Kings, London Thompson, Pete Pancrazi and Diana Lee.

=== Current studios and offices ===
By the mid 1990s, Bulger, Pick and Charlesworth had left the company, leaving Hilker in charge. In 2001, Fervor Records moved its headquarters and recording studios to its current location in Sunnyslope, Arizona.

=== Creation of Whirled Music Publishing, Inc. ===
In 2002, Hilker and Costello teamed with New York City native, Jeff Freundlich, and formed Whirled Music Publishing, Inc. to expand further into music publishing and licensing. By 2006, Whirled Music Publishing, Inc. had acquired Fervor Records and affiliated brands. In 2016, John Costello left the company. Hilker serves as the company's CEO and Freundlich as COO.

== Fervor catalog ==
=== Vintage music ===
In 2007, the label began acquiring the rights to vintage songs and recordings from the 1920s through the 2000s, spanning numerous styles and sub-genres of pop, country, soul, blues, Americana, gospel, electronic, jazz, hip hop, rock and R&B.

Fervor Records controls rights to music from historical labels including Morrison Records (Seattle, Washington) MCI, Liberty Bell, REV, Ramco, ARA, Raina, and Mascot Records (Phoenix, Arizona) Royal Audio Music aka RAM Records, K, and Clif Records (Shreveport, Louisiana) Comstock Records (Shawnee, Kansas), Trend Records (Canada) Up With People Records (Tucson, Arizona), Trend Records (Hollywood, California), Trod Nossel Studios (Wallingford, Connecticut), WSJ Records (New York), and Triplett Records (Chicago, Illinois).

=== Billboard charting songs ===
Songs in the Fervor catalog that have charted on Billboard include "Cookin" by the Al Casey Combo, "Reconsider Me" by Margaret Lewis and Mira Ann Smith, and "A Teenager Feels it Too" by Denny Reed

=== Grammy Award winners ===
Several of the artists in the Fervor catalog have received Grammy awards including Bill Champlin, Waylon JenningsSteve Vaus (aka Buck Howdy), Donna Fargo, and Jack Miller.

=== Arizona artists ===
Based in Phoenix, Arizona, Fervor Records has a special interest in finding and promoting artists from Arizona. A large part of the Fervor catalog is the work of Arizona artists. In 2007, Fervor secured a significant catalog of recordings from Audio Recorders of Arizona, a music studio owned and managed by Floyd Ramsey. Ramsey had bequeathed the catalog to Arizona music historian John P. Dixon. Ramsey's studio recorded produced, and released music from notable musicians such as Sanford Clark, Duane Eddy, Donnie Owens, Lee Hazlewood, Al Casey, Waylon Jennings, Wayne Newton, Donna Fargo, and many others. In 2017, Fervor released the double LP Mid-Century Sounds: Deep Cuts from the Desert, which features many rare songs from the Audio Recorder's catalog.

Fervor also has other Arizona artists on their roster including Bruce Connole (The Jetzons, The Strand, The Cryptics, Suicide Kings/The Revenants), Hans Olson, Francine Reed, Big Pete Pearson, Chuck Hall, The Pistoleros, Loosely Tight, Connie Conway, Phil & the Frantics, Brian Page & The Next, Blue Shoes, Patti LaSalle, Jimmy Spellman, The Pills, Gentlemen Afterdark, The Sugar Thieves, Fayuca, Super Stereo, CooBee Coo, Noonday Devils, Christopher Blue, Andy Gonzales Y Sus Amigos, Charity Lockhart, Paris James, Diana Lee, and We the People.

=== Other artists of note ===
Fervor controls the back catalog of British bassist and songwriter Tony Stevens. Stevens is well known as a founding member of Savoy Brown and co-founder of Foghat. The label also owns several songs featuring vocalist Bill Champlin of the band, Chicago.

== MTV success ==
In 2011, Fervor signed Tempe, Arizona band Super Stereo. The band made it to the Top Five on MTVU and stayed on their charts for 35 weeks with their video single, "Life Passed Me By."

Also in 2011, NYC rapper Tarik NuClothes was signed to Fervor Records. His single, "Bubble Shaker" was featured on MTV and other popular TV shows.

In 2013, Fervor signed Phoenix Latin act, Fayuca. Their single, "Por Que Seguir" came in first place on the MTV show The Freshman and went into full rotation on the MTVU broadcast network.

In 2014, Fervor Records signed upstate New York band Reckless Serenade. The band's video single "Two Years Too Late" won first place on mtvU's The Freshman and went into full rotation on the MTVU broadcast network.

In 2015, Fervor Records signed Gilbert, Arizona duo, CooBee Coo. Their video single "Never Gonna Leave Your Side" won first place on mtvU's The Freshman and went into full rotation on the mtvU broadcast network.

== Licensing success ==
Placing music in TV and film has become the label's primary focus. Over the years, Fervor has created relationships with music supervisors from many different production companies. Fervor has also collected a catalog of music which spans almost 100 years and a wide variety of genres. Music supervisors often call Fervor when they need music to fit a certain scene but don't want a famous song. Song placements help perpetuate the legacy of artists while exposing their work to new audiences. Music from the Fervor catalog has been placed in many feature films including The Glass Castle (2017), Green Book (2018), The Mule (2018), Glass (2019), and If Beale Street Could Talk (2018); popular video-streaming series including Stranger Things, Ozark, and Narcos; and numerous television series including This is Us, One Tree Hill, and Parenthood. Fervor's music has also been played in a variety of commercials.

== Awards ==
In 2018, Fervor Records was named Best Record Label in Phoenix, Arizona by the Phoenix New Times.

== Status and distribution ==
The label markets the classic collection as Fervor Records One Stop Shop Vintage Masters Series, Exploring the Sound of American Music Culture. Catalog titles include:

- Vintage Masters 1957–1967
- Vintage Soul 1962–1984
- Vintage Rock 1981–1988
- Vintage New Wave & Pop 1981–1987
- Vintage Mainstream Rock & Hot AC 1980–1989
- Vintage Country 1957–1969
- Vintage Masters 1970–1979
- Vintage Masters 1960's Rock & Pop

Fervor Records Vintage Masters is not affiliated with the label Vintage Masters, Inc.

== Fervor artists ==
- 2 da Groove
- 1933
- Absolute Ceiling
- Affordable Lawn Care
- Al Casey
- Al Kerbey
- Alex Bevan
- Andy Gerold
- Andy Gonzales Y Sus Amigos
- Anna Vivette
- Band X
- Becca Kotte
- Bent Wind
- Big Pete Pearson
- Billy Clone and The Same
- Blitz Girls
- Blue Shoes
- Bobby Barnes
- Bob Kelly
- Bob McGilpin
- Bopert Davidson
- Boxcar
- Box of Cherries
- Branch Estate
- Brian Page & The Next
- Bright Moments
- Broken Bellows
- Bruce Connole
- Buck Storm
- Cargo
- Carl Coccomo
- Chilo Escobedo
- Chimeras
- Christopher Blue
- Chuck Hall and The Brick Wall
- City Kids
- Clyde Lucas
- Connie Conway
- CooBee Coo
- Courtney Cotter King
- Craig Erickson
- Craig Marsden
- Cryptics
- Dan Darrah
- David Hardin
- Dawn Jameson
- Derrick Procell
- Dexter Lee More
- Diana Duvall
- Dick Flood
- Donnie Owens
- DUCE
- Eddy M Melanson
- Fastgun
- Fat City
- Faustus
- Fayuca
- Francine Reed
- Frank Fafara
- Fred Lederman
- freebridge
- Gene Pool
- Gentlemen Afterdark
- Geoff Grace
- Geronimo
- Glass Heroes
- Glass Target (partial catalogue)
- GWB
- Hans Olson
- Harry Krapsho
- If Walls Could Talk
- Jailhouse
- Jay Ramsey
- Jerry Honigman
- Jimmy Spellman
- Joe Montgomery
- Johnny Amoroso
- Juanita Brown
- Just Water
- Kindred
- Lab-Rats
- Lee Hurst
- Len Boone
- Lionel Lodge
- Lisa Marie Smith
- Live Nudes
- Lloyd Conger
- Lonnegan's Band
- Loosely Tight
- Lucian Blaque
- Lynn Ready
- Mail Order Brides
- Marcus
- Marcus Latief Scott
- Margaret Lewis
- Matter
- Mile Ends
- Mira Ann Smith
- Morrie Morrison Orchestra
- Mr. Fantastic
- Muevate
- Nadine Jansen
- New York Electric Piano
- Noon Day Devils
- Paris James
- Patti LaSalle
- Patty Parker
- Paul Taneja
- Peter Blair
- Peter Sivo
- Phil & the Frantics
- Phunklogistix
- Pistoleros
- PM Nightly
- Pop Kultur
- Poor Boy Rappers
- Primas Stefan and his Royal Tziganes
- RED
- Red Johnson
- Reggae Revolution
- Rhett Davis
- Rich Dolmat
- Rick Coyne
- Reckless Serenade
- Ron Higgins
- Sandy Szigeti
- Sanford Clark
- Shoeshine Boy
- Simplistics
- Slyder
- Stacie Byrne-Gibbs
- Steven Staryk
- Super Stereo
- Tarik NuClothes
- The Real Dark Half
- The Chimeras
- The Fly Bi-Nites
- The Gigalos
- The Gringos
- The Jack Gray Orchestra
- The Jetzons
- The Kollektion
- The Mears Brothers
- The Newlyweds
- The Outlets
- The Pills
- The Romeos
- The Souls
- The Soul Blenders
- The Soulsations
- The Spiffs
- The Suicide Kings/The Revenants
- The Strand
- The Sugar Thieves
- The Triplett Twins
- Tom Martin
- Tony Stevens
- UKASE
- We The People
- White Heat
- ZELLOTS
- Zeus

== Discography ==
- FVRCD06037 Amazing Hits of the Transistor Era Vol. 1 – Various Artists
- FVRCD06038 Amazing Hits of the Transistor Era Vol. 2 – Various Artists
- FVRCD06024 Fervor Divas Sing the Ballads – Various Artists
- FVRCD06031 The Beautiful Music of Elevators – Various Artists
- FVRCD06033 Old World Folk – Various Artists
- FVRCD06028 Muevate! – Muevate!
- FVRCD06029 Drop the Needle – RLO
- FVRCD06026 Paul Taneja – Paul Taneja
- FVRCD06032 The World Goes Pop! – Matt Hirt
- FVRCD06023 Paradise – Kathy Cushman
- FVRCD06016 Another Day with the Blues – Hans Olson
- FVRCD06015 Freestyle – Greg Anderson
- FVRCD06014 Trance Anthology Vol. 2 – DJ Jay C Three
- FVRCD06013 Trance Anthology Vol. 1 – DJ Jay C Three
- FVRCD06027 Electric Mayhem – 2 Da Groove
- FVRCD06007 Pure House – 2 Da Groove
- FVRCD06012 Andy Gerold – Andy Gerold
- FVRCD06011 Thrashin' Action – Brian Rogers
- FVRCD06006 Attack of the DJ's! – DJ Uff Da/DJ Jay C Three
- FVRCD06030 Fervor Chillout Sessions Vol. 1 – John Costello
- FVRCD06017 Apasionado – John Costello
- FVRCD06001 A Cooler Shade of Jazz – John Costello
- FVRCD06018 Spheres – John Costello
- FVRCD06002 Falling Forward – Mark Long
- FVRCD06003 Barrio Reggaeton – Morgan Butler/Jason DeRoss
- FVRCD06004 Reggae Revolution! – Reggae Revolution
- FVRCD06019 Acid Jazz Underground – Rich Dolmat
- FVRCD06020 Easy Listening Symph-o-Nette – The Jack Gray Orchestra
- FVRCD06010 Nu R&B – Various Artists
- FVRCD06021 Porno SoundtraXXX – Various Artists
- FVRCD06004 Thi$ I$ Hip Hop—Volume 1 – Various Artists
- FVRCD06005 Thi$ I$ Hip Hop—Volume 2 – Various Artists
- FVRCD06006 Thi$ I$ Hip Hop—Volume 3 – Various Artists
- FVRCD06021 Ultimate Lounge – Various Artists
- FVRC001 Southwest Holiday – Various Artists
- FVRC112 Arizona Unplugged – Various Artists
- FVRCD120 Blue Saguaro – Various Artists
- FVRCD97001 Musicians for St. Mary's – Various Artists

== See also ==
- List of record labels
