= Dark Superstition =

Studio album by Gatecreeper
- Released: 17 May 2024
- Studios: God City Studios (Salem, Massachusetts); Sound Signal Studio (Mesa, Arizona)
- Genre: Death metal
- Length: 37:19
- Label: Nuclear Blast
- Producer: Kurt Ballou

Gatecreeper chronology
An Unexpected Reality (2021)	Dark Superstition (2024)

Singles from Dark Superstition
- 1. "Caught in the Treads" Released: 20 February 2024; 2. "The Black Curtain" Released: 12 March 2024; 3. "Masterpiece of Chaos" Released: 17 April 2024

Dark Superstition is the third studio album by American death metal band Gatecreeper. The album was released on 17 May 2024. It is the first to feature bassist Alex Brown.

== Promotion ==
On 20 February 2024, Gatecreeper released their new single "Caught in the Treads". Coinciding with the announcement of Dark Superstition on 12 March 2024, the album's second single "The Black Curtain" was released.

On 17 April 2024, one month before the release of the album, the third single "Masterpiece of Chaos" was released.

In May 2024, the band embarked on a tour in the United States, supporting Swedish melodic death metal band In Flames.

On 25 November 2024, it was announced that Gatecreeper, alongside Amorphis and Eluveitie, would be supporting Swedish melodic death metal band Arch Enemy on their European Blood Dynasty 2025 Tour.

== Track listing ==
All lyrics are written by Chase H. Mason; all music is composed by Gatecreeper.

No.	Title	Length
1.	"Dead Star"	3:41
2.	"Oblivion"	3:11
3.	"The Black Curtain"	3:19
4.	"Masterpiece of Chaos"	3:24
5.	"Superstitious Vision"	3:52
6.	"A Chilling Aura"	3:54
7.	"Caught in the Treads"	3:35
8.	"Flesh Habit"	3:51
9.	"Mistaken for Dead"	2:41
10.	"Tears Fall from the Sky"	5:51
Total length:		37:19

== Personnel ==
=== Gatecreeper ===
- Chase H. Mason – vocals
- Eric Wagner – lead guitar
- Israel Garza – rhythm guitar
- Alex Brown – bass
- Matt Arrebollo – drums, keyboards, sound effects

=== Additional personnel ===
- Kurt Ballou – production, recording, mixing
- Ben Cook – pre-production
- Fred Estby – pre-production
- Alan Douches – mastering
- Zach Rippy – engineering (keyboards, percussion, vocals)
- Zach Weeks – engineering (additional)
- Preston Bryant – keys
- Lena Richter – cover art
- Collin Fletcher – layout
- Chase H. Mason – layout
- Karmazid – design (title)
- Joseph Maddon – photography
- Trenton Woods – photography
