= An Unexpected Reality =

EP by Gatecreeper
- Released: 13 January 2021
- Genre: Death metal
- Length: 17:56
- Label: Closed Casket Activities
- Producer: Kurt Ballou

Gatecreeper chronology
Deserted (2019)	An Unexpected Reality (2021)	Dark Superstition (2024)

An Unexpected Reality is the first EP by American death metal band Gatecreeper. It was released on 13 January 2021 through Closed Casket Activities.

== Track listing ==
All tracks are written by Gatecreeper.

No.	Title	Length
1.	"Starved"	1:03
2.	"Sick of Being Sober"	0:59
3.	"Rusted Gold"	0:57
4.	"Imposter Syndrome"	1:08
5.	"Amputation"	0:31
6.	"Depraved Not Deprived"	1:12
7.	"Superspreader"	1:00
8.	"Emptiness"	11:06
Total length:		17:56

== Personnel ==
=== Gatecreeper ===
- Chase "Hellhammer" Mason – vocals, rhythm guitar, bass
- The Dark Cowboy – lead guitar
- Matt Arrebollo – drums

=== Production ===
- Chase "Hellhammer" Mason – layout, production
- Thomas Toye – cover art, illustration
- Collin Fletcher – layout
- Ryan Brem – engineering, production
- Kurt Ballou - mixing
- Alan Douches - mastering
