= Dick Flood =

American country music singer-songwriter (1932–2023)

- Also known as: Okefenokee Joe
- Born: Richard Flood; November 13, 1932; Philadelphia, Pennsylvania, U.S.
- Died: January 9, 2023 (aged 90) Augusta, Georgia, U.S.
- Occupations: Singer-songwriter, entertainer, environmentalist

Richard "Dick" Flood (November 13, 1932 – January 9, 2023), also known as Okefenokee Joe, was an American country music singer-songwriter, entertainer, and environmentalist. In the mid-1950s he was part of the duo The Country Lads and made regular appearances on CBS' The Jimmy Dean Show. In 1959, Flood's cover version of "The Three Bells (The Jimmy Brown Story)" reached number 23 on the Billboard Hot 100. His songs have been recorded by other artists, including Roy Orbison, Anita Bryant, Billy Grammer, Kathy Linden, and The Wilburn Brothers. In 1962, The Wilburn Brothers recorded his song "Trouble's Back in Town", which peaked at number 4 on the US Country Chart and was named Cashbox Magazine’s "Country Song of the Year". In 1973, Flood moved to Georgia's Okefenokee Swamp and became a professional naturalist and environmentalist.

In 1981, Flood changed his name to Okefenokee Joe, and in 1989 he hosted and narrated the Emmy award-winning documentary Swampwise on Georgia Public Broadcasting.

== Early life ==
Richard Flood was born in Philadelphia, Pennsylvania, United States, and began playing music while working as a counselor at a YMCA summer camp in the Blue Mountains. After the campers were in bed, he would practice guitar and perform for his fellow counselors.

== Career in music ==
=== Military tours ===
After serving in Korea with the U.S. Army, Flood organized his first country music band, The Luzon Valley Boys. During this time he also began writing songs, some of which were performed by the band. The Luzon Valley Boys played at the various military clubs on Clark Air Force Base in the Philippine Islands. On one occasion they performed for the Philippine president, Ramon Magsaysay.

=== The Jimmy Dean Show ===
A few years later, Flood and army buddy, Billy Graves, auditioned for The Jimmy Dean Show. Dean asked them to perform together, so they formed the duo The Country Lads. In 1956, The Country Lads were given a regular spot on The Jimmy Dean Show, which aired on CBS every weekday morning. Like most of the Jimmy Dean Show performers, The Country Lads participated in a USO tour of Europe and Africa. In 1957 the Country Lads signed a contract with Columbia Records and released the single, “Alone In Love”/“I Won’t Beg Your Pardon” (Columbia #4-41062) and in 1958 they released the record “Anything”/”Lonely Lover” (Columbia #4-41212). The Country Lads remained on the Jimmy Dean show for three years until 1958 when the show ended.

=== Performing in Nashville ===
The Country Lads split up in 1958, and in 1959 Flood moved to Nashville to pitch his songs to the popular recording artists he had met on The Jimmy Dean Show. His preference was for songwriting, but his work as singer and entertainer was more profitable. While in Nashville, Flood landed a spot on the radio show Ernest Tubb Record Shop, and from there earned a spot performing on Friday Night Frolics (a Friday night spin-off of the Grand Ole Opry). In 1960–61, Flood was invited to sing almost every Saturday night for the Grand Ole Opry.

=== Recording artist ===
In addition to songwriting, Flood also found success as a recording artist. In 1959, he recorded a cover version of The Browns' song "The Three Bells (The Jimmy Brown Story)", which was released almost a month after The Browns' version was released (RCA Victor #47-7555). Both versions found simultaneous success on the charts with The Browns' version reaching number one, and Flood's peaking at number 23. His follow-up singles at Monument, “It Only Costs A Dime” (Monument #45-414) and “Cowpoke,” (Monument #45-427-V) received little airplay.

In October 1961, his single "The Hellbound Train" / "Judy Lynn" was released on Epic Records (Epic #5-9479). Each year, Columbia Records held a disc jockey convention in Nashville and invited disc jockeys from across the US to listen to Columbia artists perform their newly released music. Flood sang "The Hell Bound Train," and received considerable praise from his audience. However, because the lyrics included references to drunkenness, hell, and the devil, the song was banned from radio stations. It received little exposure and failed to chart.

In 1962, he released the single "King or a Clown" / "Never Has So Much Been Lost (In Just a Little While)" (Epic #5-9500). The same year he was voted by Cashbox as the “Most Up and Coming Male Vocalist in Country Music.” Flood also recorded the song "I'll See You to the Door" with Epic Records, but to Flood's dismay, they never released it. (In 2015 it was released on the album One Bright Morning by Fervor Records).

=== Dick Flood and the Pathfinders ===
In 1964, Flood organized a three piece group named Dick Flood and the Pathfinders. In addition to recording and performing in the U.S., the band also toured the military club circuit. They visited Okinawa, Guam, The Philippines, and Vietnam. While on tour, Flood contracted Dengue Fever and became seriously ill. It took several years for him to fully recover.

When he returned to the U.S., Flood created his own music label, Totem Records. In 1967, Totem Records released two songs "Miung Sun Lee" / "Willow In The Wind" (Totem T-1). During 1968–1971, he had one single released on Nasco Records, entitled "Slow It Down" (written by Kris Kristofferson) / "Speak My Name" (written by Flood) (Nasco 025), and another release on Nugget Records, "Woman Leave Me Alone" / "Home Was Never Like This" (Nugget NR-1026). None of these songs did well in the charts and Flood was becoming discouraged.

=== Songwriting and major label success ===
In 1958, Flood and Fred Foster co-wrote the Billy Graves' single "The Shag (Is Totally Cool)" (Monument Records -#45-MN.401) which reached number 53 on Billboard's Hot 100. Due to the song's success, Billy Graves was invited to tour with Dick Clark.

In 1959, Flood's song "Gee" was recorded by George Hamilton IV and released on his album Gee! (Hilltop JS-6161) as well as on his single "Gee" / "I Know Your Sweetheart" (ABC-Paramount 45–10028). "Gee" hit number 73 on the US charts.

In 1960, Roy Orbison recorded Flood's song "Here Comes That Song Again" for Orbison's album Lonely and Blue (Monument M 4002). The song was also released on Orbison's single "Only the Lonely" / "Here Comes that Song Again" (Monument #45-421).

In 1961, Anita Bryant recorded Flood's song "Cold, Cold Winter" on her single "Cold, Cold Winter" / "Step By Step, Little By Little" (Columbia #4-42257). It was later released on her 1963 album Anita Bryant's Greatest Hits (Columbia CS-8756).

In 1962, "Trouble's Back in Town" (Decca Records DL 4391) was recorded by The Wilburn Brothers and made it to number 3 on the Cashbox Country Singles chart, and number 4 on the US Country charts. It was also named Cashbox Magazine's Country Song of the Year.

Flood's songs were often found on the B-side of popular singles, such as "Only the Lonely" by Roy Orbison, and Billy Grammer's "Gotta' Travel On" / "Chasing a Dream" (Monument #45-400) which led his friends in the music business to nickname him ‘Flip Side Flood’.

== Life as Okefenokee Joe ==
=== Environmentalist ===
In 1973, Flood's second marriage was ending and his music career was struggling. Flood decided to leave it all behind and move to Georgia. He camped alone for four months until he found a job as the animal curator of the Okefenokee Swamp. For eight years he lived on the northern edge of Cowhouse Island. In 1976 he met Cindy Yeomans, who would become his third wife. After the wedding, the couple moved to Odum, Georgia.

In 1981, Flood changed his name to Okefenokee Joe. He became an expert on wildlife and ecology and began to teach lessons through his ballads and wildlife demonstrations.

Okefenokee Joe, an 11-foot-long alligator, named after him, lived and dominated in the Okefenokee Swamp, died at almost 80, in 2021.

=== TV host and narrator ===
In the late 1980s, he narrated and hosted two documentaries Swampwise and The Joy of Snakes.. He also created a DVD field guide Know Your Snakes – Venomous Snakes of the Southeastern United States. Beginning in 1991 he made several appearances on the Georgia Outdoor series produced by Georgia Public Broadcasting. He speaks and performs for schools, libraries, and seminars.

== Legacy ==
In November 2015, Flood was inducted into the Atlanta Country Music Hall of Fame. In recent years, Flood has worked with Fervor Records to release many of his previously unreleased recordings. The independent music label has also placed his music in television and film. Flood also owns his own record label, Cowhouse Island Records, and continues to write and record songs and albums about nature, simple living, and his faith.

== Personal life and death ==
Dick Flood had five boys and was the step father to two girls. He died in Augusta, Georgia, on January 9, 2023, at age 90.

== Discography ==
Performing Artist	Title (Format)	Label	Cat#	Country	Year
The Country Lads	Alone in Love/I Won't Beg Your Pardon	Columbia	4-41062-c	US	1957
The Country Lads	Lonely Lover/Anything (7", Single)	Columbia	4-412	US	1958
The Country Lads	Lonely Lover/Anything (7", Single)	Columbia	4-41212	US	1958
Billy Graves	The Shag (Is Totally Cool) (Vinyl, 7", 45 RPM, Single	Monument	45-401	US	1958
Billy Graves	The Shag (Is Totally Cool)/ Uncertain (7", Single)	Monument	45-401	US	1958
Billy Graves	The Shag/ Uncertain (7", Single)	Monument	45 MN. 401	Canada	1958
Billy Graves	The Shag/ Uncertain (7", Single)	Monument	45-401	US	1958
Billy Graves	The Shag/ Uncertain (7", Single)	Monument	45-401	US	1958
Kathy Linden	Allentown Jail/ That's What Love Is (7")	Monument	45-420	US	1960
Kathy Linden	That's What Love Is (CD, Compilation, Remastered)	Golden Sandy Records	GSR-90127		1994
George Hamilton IV	Gee/I Know Your Sweetheart (Vinyl, 7", 45 RPM, Promo)	ABC-Paramount	45-10,028	US	1959
George Hamilton IV	Gee/I Know Your Sweetheart (7", Single)	ABC- Paramount	45-10,028	US	1959
George Hamilton IV	Gee! (Vinyl, LP, Album)	Hilltop	JS-6161	US	1975
George Hamilton IV	Gee! (Vinyl, LP, Album)	Hilltop	JS-6161	Canada	1975
Roy Orbison	OnlyThe Lonely (Know the Way I Feel) / Here Comes that Song Again (7")	London Records	45-HL-1671	Australia	1960
Roy Orbison	Only The Lonely (Know the Way I Feel) / Here Comes that Song Again (7", Single, Mono)	London Records, London American Recordings	FLX 3133	Netherlands	1960
Roy Orbison	OnlyThe Lonely (Know the Way I Feel)/Here Comes that Song Again (7", Single)	London Records	9.5.190	unknown	1960
Roy Orbison	Only the Lonely / Here Comes That Song Again (7", Single)	London American Recordings	45-HL-U 9149	UK	1960
Roy Orbison	Lonely and Blue (Vinyl, LP, Album, Reissue, Mono)	Doxy Music	DOK 314	Russia	2012
Roy Orbison	Lonely and Blue (CD, Album, Ltd, RE, Pap)	Monument	SICP 3113	Japan	2011
Roy Orbison	Lonely and Blue (CD, Album, Reissue)	Monument, Legacy	82876855722	Europe	2006
Roy Orbison	Lonely and Blue (CD, Reissue)	Monument, Legacy	M 4002, 8287685572 2	US	2006
Anita Bryant	Cold, Cold Winter/Step By Step, Little By Little (Vinyl, 7", 45 RPM, Single)	Columbia	4-42257	US	1961
Anita Bryant	Cold, Cold Winter (7", Single)	Philips	PB.1214	UK	1961
Anita Bryant	Anita Bryant's Greatest Hits (Vinyl, LP, Compilation)	Columbia	CS 8756	US	1963
Anita Bryant	Anita Bryant's Greatest Hits ( LP, Compilation, Mono)	Columbia	CL 1956	US	1963
Anita Bryant	Anita Bryant's Greatest Hits (LP, Compilation)	Columbia	CS 8756	Canada	1963
Anita Bryant	Anita Bryant's Greatest Hits ( LP, Compilation, Mono, Promo)	Columbia	CL 1956	US	1963
The Wilburn Brothers	Trouble's Back In Town (Vinyl, LP, Mono)	Decca	DL 4391	US	1963
The Wilburn Brothers	Trouble's Back In Town (LP)	Decca	DL 74391	US	1963
The Wilburn Brothers	Trouble's Back In Town (LP, Mono)	Brunswick	LAT 8555	UK	1963
The Wilburn Brothers	Trouble's Back In Town- The Hits of the Wilburn Brothers (CD, Compilation)	Edsel (subsidiary of Demon Music Group)	EDCD 540	UK	1998
Dick Flood	Far Away/The Three Bells (7")	Felstead Music Corp.	45-AF. 125	Finland	1959
Dick Flood	Far Away/The Three Bells (7")	Monument	45-408	US	1959
Dick Flood	Far Away/The Three Bells (7")	London Records	45-AF 125	Denmark	Unknown
Dick Flood	It's My Way/It Only Cost a Dime (7")	Monument	45-414	US	1960
Dick Flood	Cowpoke/Carita	Monument	45-427-V	US	1960
Dick Flood	Judy Lynn/ Hellbound Train (7", Promo)	Epic Records	5-9479	US	1961
Dick Flood	King or a Clown/Never Has So Much Been Lost (In Just a Little While)(7")	Epic	5-9500	US	1962
Dick Flood	Another Stretch of Track/(Someone Was Standing) Outside Your Door (7", Single)	Epic Records	5-9556	US	1962
Dick Flood	(Same Old Crazy Me) Same Old Cheatin' You (7")	Nugget Records	NR-2200	US	1964
Dick Flood	I Need All the Friends I Can Find/These Things Make a Heartache (7")	Kapp Records	K-640	US	1965
Dick Flood	Woman Leave Me Alone/Home Was Never Like This (7", Promo)	Nugget	NR-1026	US	1968
Dick Flood	The Best of Dick Flood 1961–1967	Fervor Records	FVRCD06201	US	2014
Dick Flood	One Bright Morning	Fervor Records	FVRCD06211	US	2015
Dick Flood	The Incomparable Dick Flood	Fervor Records	FVRCD06203	US	2015
Dick Flood	Up Close and Personal	Fervor Records	FVRCD06204	US	2007
Dick Flood	The Way it Used to Be	Black Water Music Company		US	2014
Dick Flood	Cowpoke (Remastered, Single)	Bacci Bros Records		UK	2015
Dick Flood	It's My Way (Remastered, Single)	Bacci Bros Records		UK	2015
Dick Flood	Slow it Down/Speak My Name	Nasco Records	025	US	1972
Dick Flood and the Pathfinders	Between Two Worlds/From Warm to Cool to Cold	Kapp	K-681	US	1965
Dick Flood and the Pathfinders	Trouble's Back In Town/Don't Sweetheart Me (7", Single, Promo)	Kapp Records	K-754	US	1966
Dick Flood and the Pathfinders	Willow in the Wind/Miung Sung Lee (7")	Totem	T-1	US	1967
Dick Flood and the Pathfinders	Sure Gets Dark/I Didn't See You Standing There (7", Single, 45 RPM, Vinyl)	Totem	T-7, T-8	US	Unknown
Various	Hillbillies in Hell (Vinyl, LP, Album, Compilation, Deluxe Edition, Limited Edition, Remastered, Internal Red)	The Omni Recording Corporation, The Iron Mountain Analogue Research Facility	IMAR-109LP	Australia	2017

== TV and film ==
Artist Name	Song title	Show Title	Episode	Program	Production	Air Date
Dick Flood	"Everything Happens for the Best"	Last Man on Earth	212	TV	Fox	3/13/2016
Dick Flood	"Everything Happens for the Best"	Big Tips Texas	--	TV	MTV	12/1/2013
Dick Flood	"Everything Happens for the Best"	Rachel Zoe Project	401	TV	Bravo	9/6/2011
Dick Flood	"Everything Happens for the Best"	Saddle Ranch	104	TV	VH1	5/8/2011
Dick Flood	"Everything Happens for the Best"	Preacher	104	TV	AMC	6/19/2016
Dick Flood	"Everything Happens for the Best"	Preacher	105	TV	AMC	6/26/2016
Dick Flood	"Looking Around"	Aquarius	106	TV	NBC	6/25/2015
Dick Flood	"A Fool For Loving You"	11-22-63	107		Hulu	3/21/2016
Dick Flood	"Willow in the Wind"	The Astronaut Wives Club	108	TV	ABC	8/6/2015
Dick Flood	"Now I Lay Me Down to Sleep"	The Astronaut Wives Club	107	TV	ABC	7/30/2015
Dick Flood	"Now I Lay Me Down to Sleep"	Van Helsing	209	TV	SyFy	12/7/17
Dick Flood	"Warning Signs"	Children's Hospital	612	TV	Adult Swim	6/6/2015
Dick Flood	"Warning Signs"	The Frontier		Film	Independent	4/18/2015
Dick Flood	"Warning Signs"	The Good Wife	604	TV	CBS	10/12/2014
Dick Flood	"Warning Signs"	The Leftovers	301	TV	HBO	4/16/2017
Dick Flood	"I'll See You to the Door"	iZombie	201	TV	The CW	10/5/2015
Dick Flood	"Without Your Love"	The Astronaut Wives Club	105	TV	ABC	7/16/2015
Dick Flood	"Livin' in the Lonely Zone"	The Driftless Area		Film	Independent	4/18/2015
Dick Flood	"Livin' in the Lonely Zone"	Preacher	102	TV	AMC	6/5/2016
Dick Flood	"Listen to Me Self"	The Leftovers	209	TV	HBO	11/29/2015
Dick Flood	"Home Was Never Like This"	Katie Says Goodbye		Film	Independent	9/11/2016
Dick Flood	"Blue Blue Party"	Preacher	105	TV	AMC	6/26/2016
Dick Flood	"Blue Blue Party"	Preacher	106	TV	AMC	7/6/2016
Dick Flood	"I'll Never Be the Same After You"	Wynonna Earp	207	TV	SyFy	7/21/2017
Dick Flood	"Out of Sight Out of Mind"	The Man in the High Castle	102		Amazon	10/23/2015
Dick Flood	"Out of Sight Out of Mind"	SMILF	107	TV	Showtime	12/17/17
Dick Flood	"Run For Your Life"	Preacher	108	TV	AMC	7/17/2016
Dick Flood	"Sure Gets Dark When the Sun Goes Down"	Preacher	102	TV	AMC	6/5/2016
Dick Flood	"Sure Gets Dark When the Sun Goes Down"	Aquarius	207	TV	NBC	7/14/2016
Dick Flood	"I'm Going Home"	This is Us	211	TV	NBC	1/9/18
Dick Flood	"A Place Called Happiness"	Van Helsing	211	TV	SyFy	12/21/17
Dick Flood and The Pathfinders	"I Didn't See You Standing There"	I'm Dying Up Here	106	TV	Showtime	7/16/2017
Dick Flood and The Pathfinders	"Jammin' the Blues"	The Astronaut Wives Club	104	TV	ABC	7/9/2015
