= The Mason Jar =

Nightclub in Phoenix, Arizona (1979–2005)

Coordinates: 33.494°N 112.032°W

The Mason Jar was a nightclub and music venue in Phoenix which featured rock music, alternative rock, punk rock, hip-hop, and heavy metal in the 1980s, 1990s, and 2000s. Many famous bands including Nirvana, Rob Zombie, the Ramones, Joan Jett, Stone Temple Pilots, the Red Hot Chili Peppers, Pearl Jam, Tool, The Black Crowes, Los Lobos, and Meat Puppets performed at the venue.

== Founder ==
The Mason Jar was founded in 1979. Early Arizona acts included the Spiffs, Blue Shoes, Llory McDonald, and the Schoolboys (which later became Capitol Records recording act Icon). The Mason Jar was founded by Clyde Shields and then sold to Franco Gagliano after a couple of years of being in business. Gagliano is credited with growing the club and making the small venue a success with national touring bands. Gagliano, originally from Sicily, managed the club from inception until 2000. He was known for his pizzazz, personality, the clog shoes he wore, and his love-hate relationships with the bands which played at the Mason Jar.

== Initial success ==
Many bands came to the venue on their way to the Sunset Strip in Hollywood, California. Some ran out of money, never making it to Los Angeles, while others simply liked Phoenix and decided to stay. Tool, Los Lobos, Green Day, Kid Rock, Rage Against the Machine, Jane's Addiction, Red Hot Chili Peppers, Guns N' Roses, and dozens of other bands played at the Mason Jar before they achieved commercial success. Local bands including Billy Clone and the Same, The Beat Angels, Burning Flamingos, The Jetzons, Surgical Steel, Flotsam and Jetsam, Icon, The Results, and Sacred Reich also played there. Jason Newsted of Flotsam and Jetsam, who later became the bass player for Metallica, was a regular at the Mason Jar. The Manic Street Preachers were scheduled to play the final gig of their 1995 U.S. tour at the venue before the tour was canceled after the disappearance of Richey Edwards.

== Resurgence ==
The Mason Jar experienced a resurgence as a top Phoenix live music venue with the start of the new millennium, when the club was bought by local businessman Michael Manfredi aka "Mick" in 2000. Manfredi gave The Mason Jar a badly needed facelift, a substantial sound system upgrade, and a new contemporary list of rising stars to perform including Linkin Park, Disturbed, Papa Roach, Fall Out Boy, Jimmy Eat World, Opeth, Thirty Seconds to Mars. Manfredi's appetite for diversity brought The Mason Jar into new genres such as country music with David Allan Coe, Hank Williams III, Shooter Jennings, and others. Manfredi honored The Mason Jar's roots by hosting numerous acts including Megadeth, the Ramones, Rob Halford, Dishwalla, Frank Black, Vanilla Ice, Stephen Pearcy, Ice-T, Robby Krieger.

The Mason Jar was a favorite launching ground of music industry executives like Jenna Adler of Creative Artists Agency (Papa Roach, The Apex Theory), record labels such as Sony and DreamWorks, management agencies like Sanctuary Music (Rob Halford), and concert promoters including Danny Zelisko, owner of “Evening Star Productions” (which later merged with Live Nation), Tom Lapenna and Wil Anderson of Lucky Man Concerts, Kim Larowe of 13th Floor Entertainment among many more.

On August 15, 2000 Linkin Park played their first live show with singer Chester Bennington at The Mason Jar, two months before their debut record, Hybrid Theory. It was not uncommon to see famous artists, professional athletes, and politicians at the Mason Jar. Sammy Hagar, Michael Anthony (Van Halen), and other artists stopped in when booked on tour through Phoenix. Local artists like Alice Cooper and Glen Campbell's children made their debut on stage at the venue. The Mason Jar was often awarded "Top Club for Rock" by the readers of the Phoenix New Times. It gave music fans in Phoenix a chance to experience live bands the way clubgoers in Los Angeles and other major cities could.

== Closing ==
The Mason Jar closed for business on February 15, 2005, when Mick Manfredi sold the license to an outside party which no longer operated as the Mason Jar. The Mason Jar experienced its busiest year ever in its last year of business (when Manfredi was the owner), boasting over 30 bands per week and dozens of shows on sale at Ticketmaster every month. In 2006 the club closed for remodeling and re-opened as a gay bar.

On September 20, 2013 the building was used for the Legends Of The Mason Jar - One More Time event. Promoted by Glenn De Jongh, the night featured reunions of many past Mason Jar acts from the 1980s and 1990s. Acts included The Spiffs/Urge, Raven Payne, Schoolboys Again (with members of Icon, King Kobra, and Lizzy Borden), Scratch & Sniff, Egomaniacs, Killer Pussy, Blue Shoes, and Box Of Cherries/Einsteins & Scott Rowe. Longtime owner Franco Gagliano introduced the bands.

In 2014 the building was listed for sale and in 2015 it again became a local musical venue when Stephen Chilton of Psyko Steve Presents re-opened it as The Rebel Lounge. The first show was The Atlas Moth, Take Over and Destroy, and Gatecreeper. Rebel Lounge is a popular venue for emerging musical bands and DJs from all across the U.S.
