= Gentlemen Afterdark =

American rock band

- Gentlemen Afterdark in 1983

Background information
- Also known as: The Pills, GAD
- Origin: Tucson, Arizona, U.S.
- Genres: Indie rock; post-punk; new wave
- Years active: 1982–1989; 2008, 2010, 2015 (live reunions)
- Labels: A&M; Fervor
- Past members: Robin Johnson; Kevin Pate; Jon Norwood; Brian Smith; Stuart Smith; Winston Watson; Barry Smith; Mark Smythe; Rex Estell; Fred Cross

Gentlemen Afterdark were an American rock band from Tucson, Arizona. Formed as a successor to the punk group The Pills, Gentlemen Afterdark played new wave music until their breakup in 1989. They saw a revival in the 2010s, particularly after a song of theirs was prominently featured in Season 3 of the show Stranger Things.

== History ==
The Pills formed in 1979 in Tucson and played locally in venues on Tucson's North Fourth Avenue bar strip. They released a four-track, self-titled EP soon after, and the song "DC-10" received airplay on local station KWFM. At this time, the band's members were Brian Smith, Robin Johnson, Mark Smythe, Rex Estell, and Fred Cross. Smythe departed around 1981 and was replaced by Brian Smith's brother Barry Smith. In 1982, the members decided to move to Phoenix and change their name to Gentlemen Afterdark, which was the name of a song the Pills had written. There, they opened for groups such as X, Wall of Voodoo, Culture Club, and New Order. In 1983, Alice Cooper saw them perform and co-produced (with Dick Wagner) their debut EP, which they released shortly after moving once again to Los Angeles. They then were featured in People as a "star of the future" in the magazine's tenth anniversary special issue, alongside Tom Cruise and Glenn Close. They opened for Billy Preston and Midge Ure on tours in 1984.

Keyboardist and violinist Barry Smith left the group in 1984 to start a solo career, shortly after the release of the Gentlemen Afterdark EP. The group's constitution at this time was Brian Smith, Winston Watson, Fred Cross, and Robin Johnson.

The group took a hiatus in 1985, and Brian Smith returned to Los Angeles to write songs with Doug Hopkins, later of the Gin Blossoms, though the partnership did not last long. Smith then reconstituted the band with Johnson and Watson, but Watson eventually left to play in Bob Dylan's Band, and the group solidified again with the addition of Jon Norwood on drums and Kevin Pate on bass. They signed with A&M Records in 1989 and recorded a demo with Rob Jacobs, but were unable to release any material with the label. They broke up for good shortly after.

In 2008, the group reunited for a single performance at the HoCo Festival. They reunited again for two shows in Arizona in 2010, and then for HoCo again in 2015.

Arizona musician Cait Brennan covered "DC-10" in 2017. In 2019, the third season of the Netflix show Stranger Things prominently featured the song "Open the Door", which appeared on their self-titled 1983 EP. The placement happened due to Gentlemen Afterdark's partnership with Fervor Records, which also licensed a Pills track for an episode of GLOW. "Open the Door" appears in the first episode of the third season of Stranger Things, during a scene at breakfast. Stranger Things musical supervisor Nora Felder used "Open the Door" to illustrate what she called "retroactive A&R" - providing a wider platform for overlooked artists and songs from past eras.

== Members ==
- Robin Johnson - vocals, guitar
- Kevin Pate - bass
- Jon Norwood - drums
- Brian Smith - vocals
- Stuart Smith - keyboards, guitar, vocals
- Winston Watson - drums
- Barry Smith - violin, keyboards, saxophone
- Mark Smythe - guitar, vocals
- Rex Estell - drums
- Fred Cross - bass

== Discography ==
Title	Details
Gentlemen Afterdark	Released: November 20, 2015 (Note: "Gentlemen Afterdark" was originally released in 1983 but it was remastered and released in 2015 by Fervor Records.); Label: Fervor Records; Formats: Digital download, streaming, EP, CD, vinyl record
Open the Door (Note: Open the Door was featured in the soundtrack of Stranger Things season 3)	Released: February 3, 2017; Label: Fervor Records; Formats: Digital download, streaming, EP, CD, vinyl record
The Pills (as The Pills)	Released: September 14, 2018 (Note: "4 song Mini LP" was the debut EP of the band and was released independently in 1980 but 38 years later it was remastered and released under the name of "The Pills" in 2018 by Fervor Records.); Label: Fervor Records; Formats: Digital download, streaming, LP, CD, vinyl record
Calling Out (Note: Contains previously unreleased recordings from the 1980s)	Released: September 25, 2020; Label: Fervor Records; Formats: Digital download, streaming, EP, CD, vinyl record
