= Loosely Tight =

American hard rock band

Loosely Tight is an American hard rock band originally based out of Phoenix, Arizona.

== Early history ==
The band came to prominence after taking top honors at the 1979 California World Music Festival held at the Los Angeles Memorial Coliseum. More than 2100 bands entered the competition and shared the stage with Cheap Trick, Aerosmith, and Van Halen.

In conjunction with their festival success, the Loosely Tight song "Rough and Tough" was the lead off track for radio station KDKB (93.3 FM)'s 1979 album, Arizona Sounds Volume 3.

After a brief stint with Capitol Records, the band's album Fightin' Society (1981) found release on Star Struck Records (Catalog number TDS 020559).

In 2000, The Arizona Republic named Loosely Tight as #28 in their list of The 100 Best Valley Rock Bands.

== Band members ==
The Loosely Tight lineup included Dino Livingston (singer/songwriter/vocalist/guitarist), Mark Lehman (bass), Jr. Lomeli (guitar), and Pat Dixon (drums). The band's manager was Danny Zelisko. Later band members included Bob Hagen (drums), Danny Livingston (bass), and Donnie Mills (bass). Dixon went on to play drums with another Arizona based band, Icon, who recorded albums on both Capitol Records and Atlantic Records, while Lehman moved on to the band Surgical Steel, most notable for recording a song with Rob Halford of Judas Priest.

== Later history ==
The songs on Fightin' Society are now controlled by independent record label Fervor Records. The label placed the band's music in various movies, including Paramount Pictures, The Love Guru (2008), Oscilloscope Laboratories, The Messenger (2009), Grindstone Entertainment Group, The Frozen Ground (2013), Bold Films, Stronger (2017), and Universal Pictures, American Made (2017). Loosely Tight's music has also been played on several TV series, including Get Shorty, Red Oaks, The Carrie Diaries, The Neighbors, Blood Drive, and Narcos.

In 2011, Loosely Tight moved to Houston, Texas where Dino Livingston teamed up with bass player Wolff DeLong (former bass player for, most notably, Mean Gene Kelton and Super Chikan and the Fighting Cocks), and drummer, Rick Gomez. Delong and Gomez provided the rhythm section. Livingston continued to write songs and play guitar.

On December 20, 2011, the band leader and lead singer, Dino (Dennis Wayne) Livingston, died of complications from diabetes.

In 2012, Phoenix New Times chose Loosely Tight's song "Bombs Away" as one of the songs from 1981 which defined Arizona.
