= Gatecreeper =

American death metal band

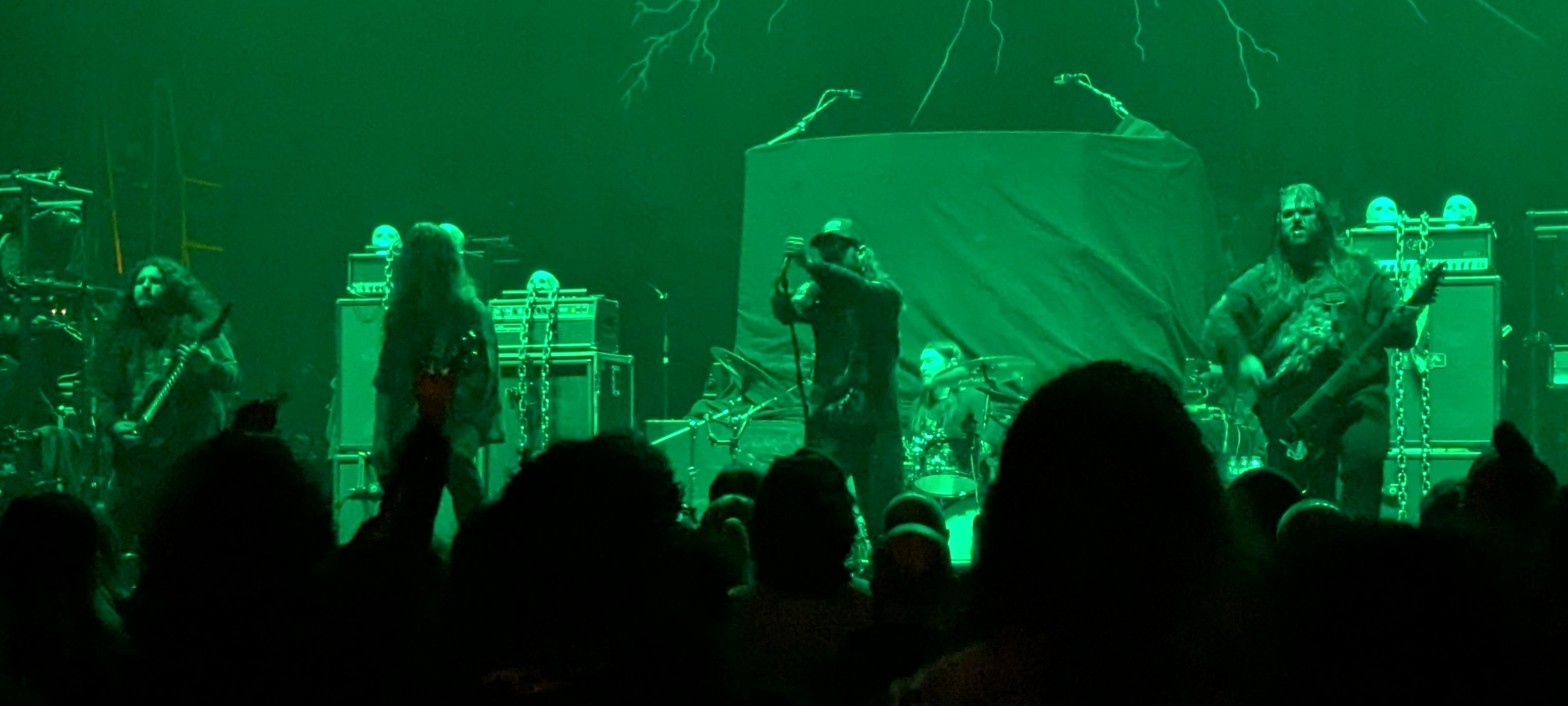
- Gatecreeper performing in Manchester in 2025

Background information
- Origin: Phoenix, Arizona, U.S.
- Genre: Death metal
- Years active: 2013–present
- Labels: Relapse, Closed Casket Activities, Nuclear Blast, Protagonist
- Members: Chase Mason; Eric Wagner; Matt Arrebollo; Israel Garza; Alex Brown
- Past members: Max Nattsblod; Nate Garrett; Sean Mears
- Website: gatecreeper.bandcamp.com

Gatecreeper is an American death metal band from Phoenix, Arizona.

== History ==
Gatecreeper released a self-titled four-song EP in 2014. In 2015, they released a split with the band Take Over and Destroy. In 2015, Gatecreeper played the first show at the Rebel Lounge—former site of the Mason Jar—with The Atlas Moth and Take Over and Destroy.

In 2016, the band was featured on a split with Homewrecker, Outer Heaven, and Scorched. In 2016, Gatecreeper released a split with the band Young and in the Way. That year, Gatecreeper released their debut full-length album on Relapse Records, titled Sonoran Depravation.

In August 2019, Gatecreeper announced their new album Deserted, which was released on October 4, 2019 on Relapse Records. Loudwire named it one of the 50 best metal albums of 2019.

In January 2021, they released the An Unexpected Reality EP. The record was ranked number fourteen on Revolver's list of the "25 Best Albums of 2021".

In May 2024, they released their third full-length album, Dark Superstition.

On November 25, 2024, it was announced that Gatecreeper would support Swedish melodic death metal band Arch Enemy's European Blood Dynasty 2025 Tour, with special guests Eluveitie and Amorphis.

The band performed at the Sonic Temple music festival in Columbus, Ohio in May 2025.

== Band members ==
Current

- Chase "Hellahammer" Mason – vocals (2013–present)
- Eric "The Darkest Cowboy" Wagner – lead guitar (2013–present)
- Matt Arrebollo – drums (2013–present)
- Israel Garza – rhythm guitar (2020–present)
- Alex Brown - bass (2021–present)

Former

- Max Nattsblod – rhythm guitar (2013–2015)
- Nate "Jack Maniacky" Garrett – rhythm guitar (2015–2019)
- Sean "Hell Mammoth" Mears – bass (2013–2021)

Touring

- Tommy Cantwell - drums (2017)
- Josh "Hallhammer" Hall – drums (2017)

== Discography ==
Studio albums

- Sonoran Depravation (2016, Relapse)
- Deserted (2019, Relapse)
- Dark Superstition (2024, Nuclear Blast)

EPs and splits

- Gatecreeper (2014, King Of The Monsters, Protagonist Music)
- Gatecreeper / Take Over and Destroy (President Gator, Common Wall Media LLC)
- Gatecreeper / Homewrecker / Outer Heaven / Scorched (Escapist Records)
- Gatecreeper / Young and in the Way (2016, A389 Recordings)
- Sweltering Madness (2017, Closed Casket Activities)
- Gatecreeper / Iron Reagan (2018, Relapse Records)
- An Unexpected Reality (2021, Closed Casket Activities)
