= Brad Buxer =

American keyboardist and composer

- Genres: Pop; electronic
- Occupations: Keyboardist; composer
- Instrument: Keyboards

Bradley Buxer is an American keyboardist and composer, known for his many collaborations with the American musician Michael Jackson. In addition to recording with Jackson, Buxer was also the musical director for Jackson's tours for many years. Prior to that, he was a session musician for artists such as Stevie Wonder and Smokey Robinson and a member of the new wave band the Jetzons with Bruce Connole, Damon Doiron and drummer Steve Golladay. In the 2000s, he reunited with Connole with the Suicide Kings.

Buxer was contracted by Jackson to write music for the 1994 video game Sonic the Hedgehog 3. He assembled a team composed of Bobby Brooks, Darryl Ross, Geoff Grace, Doug Grigsby III, and Cirocco Jones to assist him and Jackson. The theme of the game's IceCap Zone stage is an instrumental version of the then-unreleased 1981 song "Hard Times" by the Jetzons, of which Buxer was a member. The ending theme was used as a base for Jackson's 1995 single "Stranger in Moscow". As of 2020, Buxer was working as an airline pilot.

== Discography ==
Year	Project	Artist(s)	Note(s)
1982	Made in America	The Jetzons	Synthesizer, co-songwriter
1984	Bouncin’ Off the Walls	Matthew Wilder	Synthesizer
1985	In Square Circle	Stevie Wonder	Synthesizer programming
1986	To Be Continued...	The Temptations	Keyboards, synthesizer
1986	Dreaming	Amanda McBroom	Group member, synthesizer
1987	Unfinished Business	Steve Goodman	Drum programming, synthesizer
1987	One Heartbeat	Smokey Robinson	Synthesizer programming
1987	Kane Roberts	Kane Roberts	Synthesizer
1988	Reflections	George Howard	Keyboards
1989	Personal	George Howard	Engineer
1989	Come Play with Me	Grady Harrell	Programming
1990	Shut Up and Dance: Mixes	Paula Abdul	Keyboards
1990	Ivory	Teena Marie	Keyboards, programming
1990	Romance Me	Grady Harrell	Engineer
1991	The Earth Is ...	Air Supply	Keyboards, programming, strings
1991	Mixed Emotions	David Peaston	Engineer, programming
1994	Sonic the Hedgehog 3	Michael Jackson	Video game, composer
2008	The Complete Jetzons	The Jetzons	Synthesizer, co-songwriter
2013	The Lost Masters	The Jetzons	Synthesizer, co-songwriter

== Filmography ==
Year	Work	Role
2001	Michael Jackson: 30th Anniversary Celebration	music
2005	Live in Bucharest: The Dangerous Tour	actor and song performer
2006	World Music Awards 2006	segment director
