= Blue Note Hawaii =

Jazz club in Hawaii

- Interactive map of Blue Note Hawaii
- Address: 2335 Kalakaua Ave. Honolulu, HI 96816
- Coordinates: 21°16′37″N 157°49′37″W
- Capacity: 326
- Event: Jazz club

Construction
- Opened: January 14, 2016

Website
- www.bluenotejazz.com/hawaii

Blue Note Hawaii is a jazz club in Waikiki, Honolulu, Hawaii. It is a part of the Blue Note chain. It opened on January 14, 2016, with Kenny G and Jake Shimabukuro performing for several days. It features live jazz and blues music and also popular Hawaiian musical artists. It is located in the Outrigger Waikiki Beach Resort. Broadway World calls it "the state's premier venue for the world's most celebrated artists".
