= Jeff Dayton =

American singer-songwriter

Jeff Dayton (born April 5, 1953) is an American musician, singer, producer and songwriter best known as being the bandleader for Glen Campbell and the Jeff Dayton Band for 15 years, plus touring with Kenny Chesney and Lee Greenwood.

== Early life ==
Dayton was born in Minneapolis, Minnesota to George Dayton, a weekend pro guitarist and Patty Dayton, who played piano and sang. His stepfather Ruxton Strong played bass guitar. Growing up in a musical household, he developed an appreciation of folk, blues, classical, pop, rock and country music. He began playing guitar at the age of nine, and soon added drums, banjo and piano.

Dayton and his first band, "The Emperors," performed on local TV when he was still in grade school. While attending Mahtomedi Senior High School, The Blake School, and Orono High School where he began writing music, while also giving time to academics and sports.

Dayton attended Southwest Minnesota State University and was introduced to both jazz and classical performing, and studied cello with True Sackrison at The Curtis Institute of Music. He joined the school's Jazz Ensemble, and later played guitar in the University of Minnesota, Twin Cities Jazz Ensemble with Dr. Frank Bencriscutto. He studied jazz arrangement under Lance Strickland and later under Dr. Tom Ferguson at Arizona State University. At the University of Minnesota that he had the opportunity to work with Dizzy Gillespie, Thad Jones and Phil Woods and to make his first international tour to Mexico City to perform for then-President Lopez Portillo.

At Arizona State University he completed his music degree, earning a Bachelor of Arts in Music Theory/Composition and Arranging, graduating with honors.

== Career ==
Dayton performed with club bands in the upper Midwest, including a year with the KO Band, which was fronted by Bob Dylan studio musician Kevin Odegard. Their producer was David Z and their drummer a young Bobby "Z" Rivkin.

Dayton moved to Fountain Hills, Arizona and formed the Dayton-Privett Band with Mark Prentice, Tom Sawyer and Ron Privett. After 2 years, Privett left the band, and was replaced with Dave Watson; the band was renamed High Noon Band and continued until the band went their separate ways. Dayton then formed the Jeff Dayton Band, and over time about 100 different musicians performed under that name with Dayton, notably steel guitarist Ed Black, guitarist Bob "Willard" Henke, Grammy award winner producer Michael B (a.k.a. Mike Broening), drummer Mickey McGee, banjo player Bruce Leland, drummer Merel Bregante, bassist Doug Haywood, etc.[1][15]

High Noon won the Wrangler Country Showdown and the Jeff Dayton Band won the Marlboro Talent Roundup. The JDB was named New Times’ Best of the Decade's Best Award. In addition, Dayton wrote and recorded That Lady Can Love which became his first #1 record at KNIX-FM and another song earned a platinum songwriting award for George Strait with "Any Old Time." The song was also released as the "B" side of Strait's single "The Cowboy Rides Away."

Dayton and band opened for Merle Haggard, The Judds and Alabama in 1987. After a chance meeting with Glen Campbell that evening and an impromptu jam session at the grand opening of Jack Nicklaus' Desert Mountain golf course, Dayton and his group were hired to tour with Campbell.

For the next 15 years the Jeff Dayton band performed on worldwide tours, TV and record dates, celebrity events and many concerts. While Glen Campbell's’ musical director, he conducted many symphony orchestras and even Les Brown and His Band of Renown. Highlights included shows at the White House, NBC's The Today Show and the Grand Ole Opry stage. Campbell and the Jeff Dayton Band also played with Gene Autry, Willie Nelson, Bob Hope, Vince Gill and dozens more."

Dayton and his family relocated to Nashville in 2000 to allow him to step up his writing and producing career. In 2002, Campbell opted for a smaller band and less touring, and Dayton left to focus more on songwriting and sessions on Music Row. Shortly after he was called to play guitar with Lee Greenwood's band. From 2002-2005 he was a regular member of Greenwood's tour.

In 2003, Dayton filled in with Kenny Chesney's band on the Margaritas and Senoritas tour, playing on his first night in front of 16,000 in Madison, WI. With Chesney, he appeared on Late Night with Conan O’Brien and was in the live video "Live Those Songs Again" and Kenny's documentary "Road Case." He wrote songs with Eddie Montgomery of Montgomery Gentry and keyboardist Eddie Kilgallon.

In 2008 Dayton signed to Black River Music Group and produced records for Sony artist Chance McKinney and Lorrie Morgan bandmenber Daisy Mallory. In 2015 he cowrote "One of the Ones" with Aiden James and their song was picked up for the CBS hit series Hawaii Five-O. He's also had two songs recorded by Grammy winners Chubby Carrier and the Bayou Swamp Band and another regularly used on The Voice. His other recording projects include records for Buck Owens and Glen Campbell and the Kingston Trio.

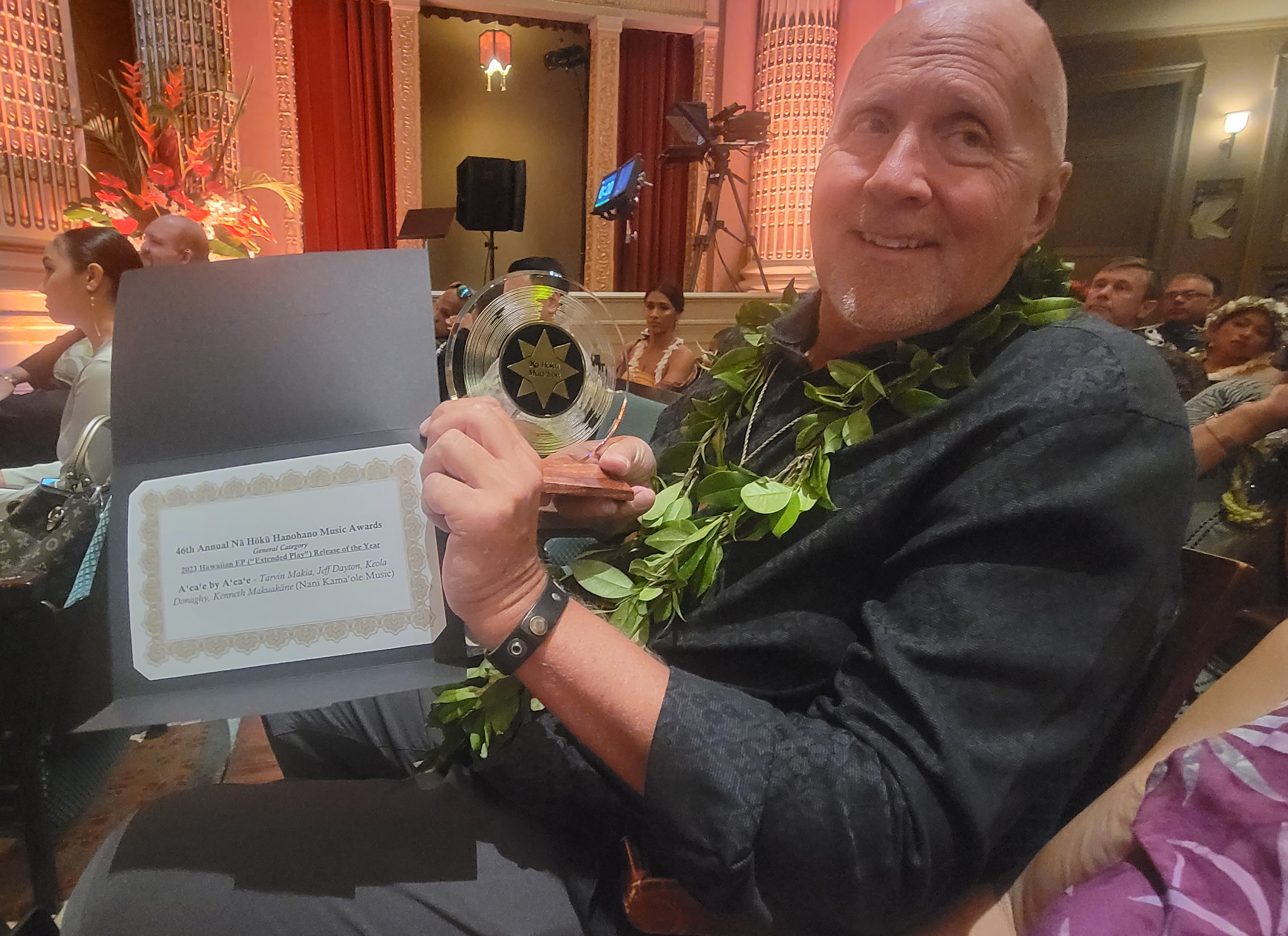
Jeff Dayton holding his Nā Hōkū Hanohano trophy

In 2022, he and three Hawai‘i musicians formed the Hawaiian music group A'ea'e. On July 1, 2023, A‘ea‘e performed at the 46th Annual Nā Hōkū Hanohano Awards in Honolulu. They were honored with the Hawaiian EP (Extended Play release) of the Year and as Group of the Year.

Spring of 2023 his song "Stoned" was recorded by Texas artist Case Hardin and as of summer '23 is a Top Five record on the Red Dirt charts.

Dayton has been a backup player for other musicians, including: Dizzy Gillespie (1977), Thad Jones (1978), Bo Diddley (1983), Steve Wariner (1983), Toby Keith, Mark Wills, Rhett Akins, Rodney Atkins, Mac Davis, Willie Nelson, Tammy Cochran (2004), Sarah Darling (2008–2010) and Donovan Chapman (2022).

== Recording credits ==
- 1978 Back to the Wall Peter Lang Guitar (Steel)
- 1984 Does Fort Worth Ever Cross Your Mind George Strait Composer
- 1992 Christmas with Glen Campbell [Delta] Glen Campbell Guitar (Acoustic), Guitar (Electric), Vocals (background)
- 1992 Leave a Little Light Behind Jess Hawk Oakenstar Producer
- 1994 Your Heart Will Show You Jess Hawk Oakenstar Dobro, Guitar, Bass (Electric), Guitar (Electric), Multi Instruments, producer, Mixing
- 1995 Merry Arizona, (various artists)
- 1995 Live from Branson, Missouri: The Best of Glen Campbell Various Artists Guitar (Acoustic), Guitar (Electric), Vocals
- 1996 Glen Campbell Live! His Greatest Hits Glen Campbell Guitar (Acoustic), Guitar (Electric), Vocals
- 1996 Love Worth Fighting For Various Artists Guitar (Acoustic), Guitar (Electric), Producer, Lap Steel Guitar, Mix Down
- 1996 Soul of My Own Jeanne Newhall Guitar (Acoustic)
- 2001 E' Sensual Jeanne Newhall Guitar
- 2001 Glen Campbell in Concert guitar
- 2003 Legacy 1961–2002 Glen Campbell Performer
- 2009 Every Monday Morning Sarah Darling Composer
- 2009 Avoid Heat and Flame Tabatha and Southern Fryd Composer
- 2009 Words & Music: Nashville Various Artists Composer
- 2012 My Faves and Yours
- 2017 Live My Truth
- 2018 The Glen Connection
- 2019 Sip It Slow
- 2021 Calypso Poet
- 2022 Tropical Troubadour
- 2022 A‘ea‘e (with Tarvin Makia, Keola Donaghy, Kenneth Makuakāne, and Māpuana Makia)
