= The Jetzons =

American new wave band

- Origin: Tempe, Arizona, U.S.
- Genres: New wave
- Years active: 1981–1983
- Labels: Pan American; Fervor
- Past members: Bruce Connole; Damon Doiron; Brad Buxer; Steve Golloday

The Jetzons were an American new wave band from Tempe, Arizona. The band comprised guitarist Bruce Connole, keyboardist Brad Buxer, bassist Damon Doiron and drummer Steve Golladay. After the band separated, Buxer became the musical director for Michael Jackson. An unreleased Jetzons song, "Hard Times", was rewritten for the 1994 video game Sonic the Hedgehog 3 and its fifth game zone Ice Cap Zone.

== History ==
The Jetzons formed in 1981 after the demise of punk group Billy Clone & the Same, which disbanded due to the heroin overdose and death of bandleader Mike Corte. Former Billy Clone guitarist Bruce Connole and bassist Damon Doiron performed briefly as the Burning Flamingos before adding keyboardist Brad Buxer and drummer Steve Golladay to form the Jetzons.

After moving to Los Angeles in 1982, the Jetzons released the EP Made in America. Tracks were recorded at Cherokee Studios in Los Angeles and Warner Bros. Studios in Burbank, CA as well as Pantheon Studios in Scottsdale, AZ. The record was released on Pan American Records. Though the EP was well received by its fanbase and critics, Connole's own heroin addiction made him difficult to work with and uncooperative, stalling any progress at recording a follow-up and making touring outside of the Los Angeles area impossible. The group played its final performance in July 1983, though they would not formally disband. By 1986, Connole had officially quit the band and returned to Tempe, and the subsequent formation of the country-inflected The Strand by Connole and Doiron signaled the demise of the Jetzons. The band's last public performance was a reunion show interrupted by a power outage New Year's Eve in 1991. They returned to all play together again one last time the next night.

In 2008, the independent label Fervor Records reissued Made in America as The Complete Jetzons and included several previously unreleased tracks. The Complete Jetzons was followed in 2013 by a further collection entitled The Lost Masters, which was also issued by Fervor.

In 2020, Fervor Records issued a vinyl single release of "Hard Times" from The Complete Jetzons, in collaboration with President Gator. 250 copies were pressed in "Sonic Blue" vinyl, with artwork evocative of "IceCap Zone" from Sonic the Hedgehog 3, referencing the music of that stage which was based on "Hard Times".

== Influence ==
The band was at the forefront of establishing the Tempe music scene that would soon come to national prominence by the signing of many area bands to major record labels. They were also a very popular live band, known for their mixture of covers and originals. Robin Wilson, singer of Gin Blossoms, said: “I remember when I first joined the band, someone said, "That's Robin. He's in a local group called the Gin Blossoms -- they're almost as good as the Jetzons." Man, I remember hearing that and, at the time, just to be considered in the same breath as those guys was better than selling a million records. That's how important they were.”

== Following the Jetzons ==
After the Jetzons breakup, keyboardist Brad Buxer worked with Matthew Wilder, the Temptations, Smokey Robinson, and Stevie Wonder, and was musical director for Michael Jackson for over 18 years. On September 12, 2008, independent record label Fervor Records released several previously unreleased Jetzons songs. One song, "Hard Times", closely resembles the theme for the level "IceCap Zone" in the 1994 video game Sonic the Hedgehog 3, for which Buxer composed music. According to Buxer and other sources, Jackson was also involved in composing for the game, though the publisher, Sega, denied this.

Guitarist and lead vocalist Bruce Connole has led a long list of bands including the Strand, the Cryptics, The Pearl Chuckers, and the Busted Hearts. In the late 1990s, Connole reunited with Buxer for the band the Suicide Kings, which has also used the name the Revenants at times to avoid legal problems.

Bassist Damon Doiron has continued playing music, including a short-lived stint in 1985 as lead vocalist in Doug Hopkins's band Algebra Ranch, as well as participating with Connole in the Strand in the late 1980s. More recently, he has played in the pop band the Jennys.

== Discography ==
=== EPs ===
Year	Title
1982	Made in America: Released: 1982; Format: 12" Vinyl
2008	The Complete Jetzons: Released September 12, 2008; Format: Digital
2013	The Lost Masters: Released: August 13, 2013; Format: Download

=== Singles ===
Year	Title
2020	"Hard Times": Released: 2020; Format: 7" Vinyl
