= European Country Music Association =

The European Country Music Association (ECMA) was established in 1994 in the United Kingdom and Spain by people related to the European country music scene, including publishers, DJs and musicians. It originally consisted of less than 100 members. The first president was the UK's Harry E. Fenton.

After Fenton's death, Rafel Corbi—a DJ from Spain—was elected to the presidency, and he remains in charge of the organization, which is still a non-profit association. All members of the Board of Directors are volunteers. It was the first organization formed in Europe to promote country music at a general level, covering all of Europe. The objectives of the organization are to help promote country music in this continent and help as much as it can the value of the European artists and record labels; also to provide a proof of real airplay to the country music industry through its weekly national and pan-European charts. Its national Top-20 covers weekly Spain, France, Belgium, Holland, UK, Ireland, Norway, Sweden, Denmark, Germany, the Czech Republic, Switzerland, Malta, Poland and Austria.

ECMA membership is composed of those persons or organizations that are involved in country music throughout the world, having members in the United States, Canada, the UK, Australia and many European countries. ECMA has over 150 stations and DJs reporting their playlists every week.

The ECMA also has its annual awards (votes comes only from members of the organization):

== ECMA Awards 2008 ==
Announced November, 2009

- SONG OF THE YEAR: Alan Jackson, "Small Town Southern Man"
- ARTIST OF THE YEAR: Alan Jackson
- MALE VOCALIST OF THE YEAR: Alan Jackson
- FEMALE VOCALIST OF THE YEAR: Pam Tillis
- ALBUM OF THE YEAR: Alan Jackson, Good Time
- INDIE ALBUM OF THE YEAR: Dolly Parton, Backwoods Barbie
- GROUP/BAND OF THE YEAR: The Eagles
- DUO OF THE YEAR: The Bellamy Brothers
- VOCAL COLLABORATION OF THE YEAR: Frizzell & Friends, "This Is Our Time"
- NEWCOMER OF THE YEAR: Gary & Carol Bibb
- EUROPEAN ARTIST OF THE YEAR: Hermann Lammers Meyer
- EUROPEAN ALBUM OF THE YEAR: Hermann Lammers Meyer, A Love Song
- EUROPEAN SONG OF THE YEAR: Hermann Lammers Meyer, "What's Goes On"
- COMPILATION SERVICE OF THE YEAR: Hillcrest
- RECORD LABEL OF THE YEAR: Arista
- COUNTRY MUSIC PROMOTER: Ross Allen
- CHRISTMAS RECORDING: Pam Tillis & Mel Tillis, The Rockin' Christmas Medley
- COMPANY OF THE YEAR: Rohn & Bob Promotions (artists promotion)
- RADIO AWARD: Pete Smith
- MEDIA AWARD: American Music Association

== ECMA Awards 2007 ==
Announced May, 2008

- SONG OF THE YEAR: Peter & The Rowers, "I'm Leavin'"
- ARTIST OF THE YEAR: Peter & The Rowers
- ALBUM OF THE YEAR: George Strait, It Just Comes Natural
- MALE VOCALIST OF THE YEAR: Billy Yates
- FEMALE VOCALIST OF THE YEAR: Carrie Underwood
- GROUP/BAND OF THE YEAR: Peter & The Rowers
- DUO OF THE YEAR: Brooks & Dunn
- VOCAL COLLABORATION OF THE YEAR: Brooks & Dunn w/ Sheryl Crow & Vince Gill, "Building Bridges"
- EUROPEAN ARTIST OF THE YEAR: Peter & The Rowers
- EUROPEAN ALBUM OF THE YEAR: Hermann Lammers Meyer, Yesterday Once More
- EUROPEAN SONG OF THE YEAR: Peter & The Rowers, "I'm Leavin'"
- EUROPEAN COUNTRY RADIO DJ OF THE YEAR: Hermann Lammers Meyer
- ECMA FUTURE STAR AWARD: Peter & The Rowers
- INDIE ALBUM OF THE YEAR: Mike Lounibos, Planet California
- COUNTRY PROMOTION COMPANY OF THE YEAR: Rohnbob Promotions
- COMPILATION SERVICE OF THE YEAR: Hillcrest
- MEDIA AWARD: Lucie Diamond (UK)

== ECMA Awards 2006 ==
Announced July 8, 2007

- SONG OF THE YEAR: Faith Hill, "Mississippi Girl"
- ARTIST OF THE YEAR: Troy Cook Jr.
- MALE VOCALIST OF THE YEAR: Todd Fristch
- FEMALE VOCALIST OF THE YEAR: Lucie Diamond
- GROUP/BAND OF THE YEAR: Slow Horses
- DUO OF THE YEAR: Brooks & Dunn
- VOCAL COLLABORATION OF THE YEAR: Roy Rivers & Dolly Parton, "Thank God I'm a Country Boy" (Roy Rivers sent the following message along with Dolly: "Dear Voting Members and Professionals of the ECMA, it is with great excitement and thanks that Dolly and I accept your votes awarding us the 2006 Vocal Collaboration of the Year award! For me personally to have been nominated in so many categories was both a humbling and empowering experience. To actually win this award is a tremendous honor that will always be looked back upon as a cherished highlight of my career in music.I look forward to bringing more music to the great people of Europe in the future. I feel I've found a home there, and like everyone, I'm always anxious to return home. Thank-you for honoring and accepting me! Peace, Roy Rivers")
- COUNTRY PROMOTER OF THE YEAR: Ross Allen
- COUNTRY RADIO DJ OF THE YEAR: Etienne Bertels & Pete Smith
- EUROPEAN COUNTRY ARTIST OF THE YEAR: Lucie Diamond
- ECMA FUTURE STAR AWARD: Lucie Diamond (UK)
- ALBUM OF THE YEAR: "Todd Fristch". Todd Fristch
- COMPOSITION OF THE YEAR: "I Can't Look At That" (Christian Ulrich Schulz & Tom Dyba), sung By Slow Horses

== ECMA Awards 2005 ==
The only year in which the awards were fan-voted Announced April 1, 2006

- Entertainer of the Year: Troy Cook Jr. (USA)
- Song Of The Year: Gretchen Wilson's "Redneck Girl" (USA)
- Vocal Collaboration of the Year: Rustie Blue & Bill Anderson for "Chip Chip" (USA)
- Male Vocalist of the Year: Arly Karlsen (Norway)
- Female Vocalist of the Year: Ashley Robertson (Canada)
- Band/Group of the Year: Slow Horses (Germany)
- European Entertainer of the Year: Tommy The UK Cowboy (UK)
- Duo of the Year: Paul & Helen Mateki (USA)
- Promo Agents/Public Relations Company of the Year: RhonBob Promotions (USA)
- Horizon Award: Gretchen Wilson (USA)
- Most Played Artist Award: Troy Cook Jr. (USA)

== Past ECMA awards ==
For the complete list of previous ECMA awards, check the official site of the ECMA: http://www.europeancma.com/awards.htm
