= List of Barack Obama 2008 presidential campaign staff members =

Coordinates: 41.886199°N 87.62446°W

List of persons holding prominent positions within the Barack Obama presidential primary campaign, 2008.

According to an August 2008 statement by Deputy Campaign Manager Steve Hildebrand, the Obama campaign had "large-scale operations in 22 states, medium operations in many others, and small staffs in only a handful of states," with several thousand paid operatives on the ground between Obama staff and Democratic Party staff. That month, these numbers included "about 200 paid staffers working in Florida and more on the way, 90 in Michigan with plans to expand to 200 by August, at least 200 each eventually in Pennsylvania and Ohio, and 50 in Missouri with plans to expand to 150."

== Inner circle ==
- David Axelrod, media strategist. Founder of Chicago-based AKP Media. Handled Obama's 2004 Senate race. Consultant to Chicago Mayor Daley and Rep. Rahm Emanuel.
- David Plouffe, campaign manager. Partner, AKP Media, lives in Washington.
- Robert Gibbs, communications chief. Spokesman for Obama's Senate and political operations.
- Anita Dunn, handled communications and policy. Principal with Washington-based Squier, Knapp, Dunn Communications.
- Steve Hildebrand, Deputy Campaign Manager. Runs South Dakota–based political consulting firm and is an Iowa specialist.
- Joel Benenson, Chief Pollster, runs the New York City–based Benenson Strategy Group.
- Betsy Myers, chief operating officer. Executive director of the Center for Public Leadership at Harvard Kennedy School. Director of President Bill Clinton's Office for Women's Initiatives and Outreach. Sister of Dee Dee Myers, Clinton's first press secretary.
- Penny Pritzker, National Finance Director.

The vice presidential search committee included:

- Jim Johnson (not accused of any wrongdoing but later resigned to avoid being a distraction)
- Eric Holder
- Caroline Kennedy

== Early advisors ==
An early 2007 article in the Chicago Sun-Times lists the following persons in Obama's White House team:

- Paul Tewes, adviser; business partner of Hildebrand's.
- Bill Burton, national press secretary. Spokesman, Democratic Congressional Campaign Committee this cycle.
- Paul Harstad, pollster. Handled Obama's 2004 campaign.
- Cornell Belcher, pollster. Democratic National Committee pollster.
- Devorah Adler, research director. DNC research director.
- Rakitha Hettiarachchi, The Political Campaign Director of Nevada State Democratic Party.
- Shauna Daly, deputy research director. DNC deputy research director.
- Alyssa Mastromonaco, scheduling and advance. Political director for Obama's Hope Fund political action committee.
- Saul Schorr, media consultant. Runs a Philadelphia firm.
- Julianna Smoot, finance director. Finance director for the Democratic Senatorial Campaign Committee this cycle.
- Cassandra Butts, policy advisor. Previously the Center for American Progress think tank. Obama law school classmate. Former senior policy adviser to House Democratic Leader Richard Gephardt.
- Pete Giangreco, direct mail, Iowa adviser. Partner, the Strategy Group, Evanston. Veteran of several Iowa primaries.
- Dan Pfeiffer, traveling press secretary. Former press chief for Senator Evan Bayh (D-Ind.).
- Matt Rodriguez, New Hampshire state director.

Other key staff positions filled internally and from rival campaigns after the primaries included:

- Henry De Sio, Chief Operating Officer
- Patrick Gaspard, Political Director
- Jon Carson, National Field Director
- Jennifer O'Malley Dillon, Battleground States Director
- Jason Green, 50-State Voter Registration Director
- Josh Earnest, Deputy Communications Director
- Christina Reynolds, Director of Rapid Response
- Hari Sevugan, Senior Spokesperson
- Tommy Vietor, Deputy National Press Secretary
- Cody Keenan, Deputy Speechwriter
- Neera Tanden, Director of Domestic Policy
- Heather Higginbottom, Senior Policy Strategist
- Daniel Gray, Deputy Policy Director
- Jason Furman, Deputy Policy Director
- Dan Carol, Content and Issues Director
- Stephanie Cutter, Senior Advisor and Chief of Staff to Michelle Obama
- Jennifer Goodman, Director of Scheduling for Michelle Obama
- Patty Solis Doyle, Chief of Staff to Joe Biden
- Ricki Seidman, Communications Director for Joe Biden

== Foreign policy ==
By July 2008 the Obama campaign had some 300 persons working on foreign policy, and organized along bureaucratic lines like a "miniature State Department." Notable among these people are:

- Denis McDonough, 38, Obama's "top foreign policy aide."
- Susan E. Rice, assistant secretary of state for African affairs in the Clinton administration.
- Anthony Lake, Clinton's first national security adviser, who was criticized for the administration's failure to confront the genocide in Rwanda in 1994 and now acknowledges the inaction as a major mistake.
- Greg Craig, a former top official in the Clinton State Department; also served as Clinton's lawyer during his impeachment trial.
- Richard J. Danzig, a Navy secretary in the Clinton administration.
- Mark Lippert, Obama's former Senate foreign policy adviser.
- Mark Brzezinski, foreign policy expert and partner at the McGuireWoods law firm. He is the son of former US National Security Advisor Zbigniew Brzezinski
- Samantha Power, Pulitzer Prize-winning journalist, writer, and academic. She is currently affiliated with the Carr Center for Human Rights Policy at Harvard Kennedy School. Resigned in March 2008 after being quoted in an interview with The Scotsman that Hillary Clinton "is a monster."
- Dennis Ross, the Middle East envoy for President Clinton and the first President Bush, now a member of the Obama campaign's Middle East team. He has advised the Obama campaign on legal issues, including the rights available to Palestinians in the Occupied Territories.
- Michael McFaul, a Russia scholar at Stanford University and co-director of Hoover Institute's Iran Democracy Project with Larry Diamond and Abbas Milani, leads the Russia and Eurasia team for the Obama campaign.
- Ivo H. Daalder, a scholar at the Brookings Institution who has organized his 40-member nuclear nonproliferation team into eight working groups.
- Philip H. Gordon, also of Brookings, is in charge of Obama's Europe team.
- Sarah Sewall, a Harvard Kennedy School professor and former Clinton Defense Department official who wrote the introduction to the University of Chicago edition of the new counterinsurgency manual Gen. David Petraeus revised for the military, is advising on counterinsurgency strategy.
- John O. Brennan, president and CEO of the Analysis Corp., advises Obama on foreign policy and intelligence issues. He is also a former CIA official and the current chairman of the Intelligence and National Security Alliance.
- Merrill McPeak, USAF (ret) figures prominently among Obama's military advisors.
- Colin L. Powell, former Secretary of State, "has contributed outside advice."
- As has Zbigniew Brzezinski, National Security Advisor under Jimmy Carter.

Former Hillary Clinton supporters:

- Madeleine K. Albright
- Warren Christopher

== Energy policy ==
- Howard A. Learner, Senior Environmental and Energy policy adviser; prior to the campaign, executive director of the Environmental Law and Policy Center.
- Jason Grumet, formerly executive director of the National Commission on Energy Policy.
- Elwood (Elgie) Holstein Jr, former Assistant Secretary for Oceans and Atmosphere under Bill Clinton.

== Economic policy ==
- Austan Goolsbee, 37, a University of Chicago professor and columnist for The New York Times
- Jason Furman, 38, Brookings Institution scholar and expert on tax and budgetary policy and health care
- Jeffrey Liebman 39, a pension and poverty expert at Harvard University, in Cambridge, Massachusetts
- David Cutler, 41, a Harvard health economist
- Karen Kornbluh, 44, served as policy director in Obama's Senate office, having joined in 2002 after working for the Clinton administration and the New America Foundation in Washington.
- Daniel Tarullo, a professor at Georgetown University in Washington, and a former senior economic adviser in the Clinton administration
- Michael Froman, the chief of staff for former Treasury Secretary Robert Rubin who now works with his old boss at Citigroup.

== Domestic policy ==
- Cassandra Butts, policy advisor. Obama's friend and Harvard Law School classmate. Previously with the Center for American Progress think tank. Former senior policy adviser to House Democratic Leader Dick Gephardt.
- Linda Darling-Hammond, education advisor. Professor of education at Stanford University.
- Arne Duncan, education advisor. CEO of the public school system in Chicago.
- Heather Higginbottom, senior policy strategist, former national policy director on John Kerry's presidential campaign

== New media ==
- Joe Rospars, New Media Director
- Michael Slaby, Deputy Director & CTO
- Macon Phillips, Deputy Director
- Chris Hughes, developer of Facebook
- John Slabyk, Art Director
- Stephen Geer, Email Director
- Sam Graham-Felsen, Blog Director

== Former members ==
- Samantha Power, journalist, academic; resigned in April 2008 after calling Hillary Clinton a "monster."
- Jim Johnson, tapped by Obama to lead his vice presidential search committee. However, Johnson soon became a source of controversy when it was reported that he had received loans directly from Angelo Mozilo, the CEO of Countrywide Financial, a company implicated in the U.S. subprime mortgage lending crisis., and resigned abruptly on June 11, 2008.

== See also ==
- List of John McCain presidential campaign staff members, 2008
- Presidential transition of Barack Obama
- Obama administration
