= Ted Newman =

Ted Newman may refer to:

- Ezra T. Newman (1929–2021), American physicist
- Ted Newman (singer) (born 1939), American singer and musician

== See also ==
- Edward Newman (disambiguation)
- Theodore R. Newman Jr. (born 1934), chief judge of the District of Columbia Court of Appeals
