= Mid-Century Sounds: Deep Cuts From the Desert =

Compilation album by Various Artists
- Released: June 16, 2017
- Recorded: 1957–1973
- Studio: Audio Recorders of Arizona
- Genre: Pop, rock, R&B/soul, funk, country, jazz
- Label: Fervor Records
- Producer: David Hilker, Jeff Freundlich, Marmoset

Mid-Century Sounds: Deep Cuts From The Desert is a two volume compilation album (Vinyl, LP) released in 2017 by independent record label Fervor Records in collaboration with Marmoset. Several songs on this LP charted in Billboard Magazine including "Plaything" by Ted Newman in 1957 and "Cookin" by the Al Casey Combo in 1962. Since the album's release, multiple songs have been featured in popular TV shows and films including Lionsgate Films The Glass Castle, the Netflix Original Series Orange is the New Black, and short film, Made Back East, released December 2020.

== Background and production ==
Mid-Century Sounds: Deep Cuts From the Desert profiles the career of the late music entrepreneur Floyd Ramsey (March 22, 1926 – April 16, 2008) The album features songs from the Phoenix, Arizona music scene from 1957 to 1973. During this time, Ramsey was instrumental in launching the careers of artists including Sanford Clark, Duane Eddy, Lee Hazlewood, Waylon Jennings, Wayne Newton, and Donna Fargo. Sanford Clark, Waylon Jennings, and a young Wayne Newton are featured on the album.

All songs on this compilation have direct ties to one of Floyd Ramsey's many music enterprises. He was the owner of Audio Recorders of Arizona in Phoenix, Arizona where most of the songs were recorded. He was the founder of several record labels including Liberty Bell Records, REV Records, Ramco Records, and ARA Records and he later acquired MCI Records, a label which had released many singles recorded at his studio. Most of the songs on this album were originally released by one of these record labels. Ramsey also owned publishing on most songs through his companies Renda Music, BMI, and Desert Palms Music, BMI. Floyd Ramsey was inducted into the Arizona Music and Entertainment Hall of Fame in 2005 for his many accomplishments.

== TV, film, and advertising ==
Song title	Artist	Mid Century Sounds	Program	Type	Network/Source	Episode	Air date
"Never With Your Heart"	Ralph Smith w/ Bob Taylor's Western Aces	Vol. 1	na	na	na	na	na
"How Many Times"	Patti LaSalle	Vol. 1	na	na	na	na	na
"I Got the Blues"	Glenn Morris	Vol. 1	Lost Boys: The Thirst	Film	Warner Premiere	na	2010
"I Got the Blues"	Glenn Morris	Vol. 1	Cold in July	Film	Independent	na	2014
"Night Creatures"	The Gigolo's	Vol. 1	Staten Island Summer	Film	Paramount Pictures	na	na
"Night Creatures"	The Gigolo's	Vol. 1	Work For It	Advertising	Amazon	na	2017
"Two Time Loser"	Joe Montgomery	Vol. 1	Being Human	TV	SyFy	110	3/21/11
"Two Time Loser"	Joe Montgomery	Vol. 1	12 Monkeys	TV	SyFy	212	7/11/16
"Two Time Loser"	Joe Montgomery	Vol. 1	The Astronaut Wives Club	TV	ABC	105	7/16/15
"Two Time Loser"	Joe Montgomery	Vol. 1	The Glass Castle	Film	Lionsgate	na	2017
"You'll Never Wear a Halo"	Nick Landers	Vol. 1	na	na	na	na	na
"She Is My Dream"	The Tads	Vol. 1	The Playboy Club	TV	NBC	105	
"She Is My Dream"	The Tads	Vol. 1	Parks and Recreation	TV	NBC	510	
"She Is My Dream"	The Tads	Vol. 1	Scorpion	TV	CBS	318	2/27/17
"She Is My Dream"	The Tads	Vol. 1	Orange is the New Black	SVOD	Netflix	504	6/9/17
"She Is My Dream"	The Tads	Vol. 1	Orange is the New Black	SVOD	Netflix	505	6/9/17
"She Is My Dream"	The Tads	Vol. 1	American Gods	TV	Starz	107	6/11/17
"She Is My Dream"	The Tads	Vol. 1	Killjoys	TV	SyFy	308	8/18/17
"She Is My Dream"	The Tads	Vol. 1	Vegas	TV	CBS	Pilot	
"Do It Twist"	Ritchie Hart and His Hartbeats	Vol. 1	DSquared	Ad	SS18 Video	na	2017
"Four in the Morning"	Dave Moore	Vol. 1	The Astronaut Wives Club	TV	ABC Studios	104	7/9/15
"Four in the Morning"	Dave Moore	Vol. 1	The Meddler	Film	Sony Classics	na	2015
"Four in the Morning"	Dave Moore	Vol. 1	Girlfriend's Guide to Divorce	TV	Bravo	205	12/29/15
"Drifting Heart"	Roosevelt Nettles	Vol. 1	Saving Hope	TV	NBC	218	2/17/14
"Drifting Heart"	Roosevelt Nettles	Vol. 1	The Wannabe	Film	Independent	na	2015
"A Better Man Than Me"	Gary Trexler	Vol. 1	The Birder	Film	Independent	na	2013
"A Better Man Than Me"	Gary Trexler	Vol. 1	The Astronaut Wives Club	TV	ABC	110	
"Old Enough to Have a Broken Heart"	Judy Lunn	Vol. 1	The Pretty One	Film	Provenance Pictures, Schorr Pictures	na	2013
"Start at the Bottom"	The Newton Brothers	Vol. 1	Arthur (2011 film)	Film	Warner Bros.	na	2011
"Start at the Bottom"	The Newton Brothers	Vol. 1	The Dudesons in America	TV	MTV2	112	
"Start at the Bottom"	The Newton Brothers	Vol. 1	Preacher	TV	AMC	103	6/19/16
"Cookin'"	Al Casey Combo	Vol. 1	30 for 30	TV	ESPN	na	
"Cookin'"	Al Casey Combo	Vol. 1	12 Monkeys	TV	SyFy	210	6/20/16
"Cookin'"	Al Casey Combo	Vol. 1	Stranger Things	SVOD	Netflix	203	10/27/17
"Plaything"	Ted Newman	Vol. 1	Wynonna Earp	TV	SyFy	205	2017
"Once Upon a Time"	Sanford Clark	Vol. 2	na	na	na	na	na
"My World"	Waylon Jennings	Vol. 2	The Glass Castle	Film	Lionsgate	na	2017
"My World"	Waylon Jennings	Vol. 2	The Player	TV	NBC	108	11/12/15
"My World"	Waylon Jennings	Vol. 2	Justified	TV	FX	407	2/19/13
"My World"	Waylon Jennings	Vol. 2	Criminal Minds	TV	CBS	923	5/7/14
"My World"	Waylon Jennings	Vol. 2	NCIS	TV	CBS	1419	3/28/17
"I'm Glad I Knew You"	P-Nut Butter	Vol. 2	The Astronaut Wives Club	TV	ABC	108	8/6/15
"What's Happening"	Phil & The Frantics	Vol. 2	na	na	na	na	na
"Boo Hoo"	Donnie Owens	Vol. 2	na	na	na	na	na
"One More Time"	Tommy Strange	Vol. 2	Monte Carlo	Film	20th Century Fox	na	2011
"One More Time"	Tommy Strange	Vol. 2	A Single Shot	Film	Unified Pictures, Media House Capital, A Single Shot Production	na	2013
"One More Time"	Tommy Strange	Vol. 2	Parenthood	TV	NBC	311	11/29/11
"One More Time"	Tommy Strange	Vol. 2	Good Behavior	TV	TNT	206	11/19/17
"So Goes My Dream"	Nadine Jansen	Vol. 2	I'm Dying Up Here	TV	Showtime	106	6/16/17
"So Goes My Dream"	Nadine Jansen	Vol. 2	Life in Pieces	TV	CBS	203	11/10/16
"So Goes My Dream"	Nadine Jansen	Vol. 2	Workin' Moms	TV	CBC	201	1/9/18
"Happy Just to Be Alive"	Christopher Blue	Vol. 2	Hot in Cleveland	TV	TV Land		
"Happy Just to Be Alive"	Christopher Blue	Vol. 2	Autopsy of Jane Doe	Film	Independent	na	2016
"Happy Just to Be Alive"	Christopher Blue	Vol. 2	Cathouse: The Series	TV	HBO	402	12/1/11
"Happy Just to Be Alive"	Christopher Blue	Vol. 2	The Mick	TV	FOX	111	2/21/17
"Happy Just to Be Alive"	Christopher Blue	Vol. 2	An American Girl Story- Ivy and Julie: 1976 A Happy Balance	Film	Amazon	na	2017
"Happy Just to Be Alive"	Christopher Blue	Vol. 2	Ashby	Film	Independent	na	2015
"Happy Just to Be Alive"	Christopher Blue	Vol. 2	Vacation	Film	Warner Bros.	na	2015
"Happy Just to Be Alive"	Christopher Blue	Vol. 2	American Express	Ad	American Express		2016
"Too Good to Be True"	Lon Rogers & The Soulblenders	Vol. 2	Murder in the First	TV	TNT	309	8/28/16
"Too Good to Be True"	Lon Rogers & The Soulblenders	Vol. 2	Girlfriend's Guide to Divorce	TV	Bravo	203	12/15/15
"Too Good to Be True"	Lon Rogers & The Soulblenders	Vol. 2	Supernatural	TV	The CW	1311	1/24/18
"Get Up"	The Harvey Truitt & Jack Miller Project	Vol. 2	na	na	na	na	na
"One Afternoon"	Motion	Vol. 2	Pike's Peak	Ad	Pike's Peak	na	2018
"Blending Soul"	The Soul Blenders	Vol. 2	Grounded	Film	Independent	na	2013
"Blending Soul"	The Soul Blenders	Vol. 2	Sirens	TV	USA	Pilot	
"Blending Soul"	The Soul Blenders	Vol. 2	The Listener	TV	CTV	207	4/1/11
"Blending Soul"	The Soul Blenders	Vol. 2	Grudge Match	Film	Warner Bros.	na	2013
"Blending Soul"	The Soul Blenders	Vol. 2	The L.A. Complex	TV	The CW	210	
"Blending Soul"	The Soul Blenders	Vol. 2	It's Always Sunny in Philadelphia	TV	FXX	1209	3/1/17
"Blending Soul"	The Soul Blenders	Vol. 2	The Wannabe	Film	Independent	na	2015
"Blending Soul"	The Soul Blenders	Vol. 2	The Guest Book	TV	TBS	03	8/10/17
"Blending Soul"	The Soul Blenders	Vol. 2	NBA 2K18 Handshakes Campaign	Ad	NBA	na	9/8/17
"Blending Soul"	The Soul Blenders	Vol. 2	The Deuce	TV	HBO	103	9/24/17
"Blending Soul"	The Soul Blenders	Vol. 2	Good Girls' Revolt	SVOD	Amazon	106	10/28/16
"Blending Soul"	The Soul Blenders	Vol. 2	Ex-Girlfriends	Film	Independent	na	2012
"Blending Soul"	The Soul Blenders	Vol. 2	A Futile and Stupid Gesture	Film	Netflix	na	1/26/18
"Ain't No Time for Stoppin'"	Fat City	Vol. 2	12 Monkeys	TV	SyFy	206	5/23/16
"Loaded Back"	Michael Liggins & The Supersouls	Vol. 2	Levi's Skateboarding Oakland	Ad	Levi's	na	2015
"Loaded Back"	Michael Liggins & The Supersouls	Vol. 2	The Deuce	TV	HBO	102	9/17/17
"Loaded Back"	Michael Liggins & The Supersouls	Vol. 2	Kusama: Infinity	Film	Independent	na	1/21/18

== Advertising ==
The 1968 recording "Blending Soul" by the Soul Blenders (Side D) was featured as the "Ad of the Day" on September 11, 2017, in Adweek Magazine.

== Track listing ==
Side A (1957–59)

1. “Never With Your Heart” — Ralph Smith w/ Bob Taylor's Western Aces
2. “I Got the Blues” — Glen Morris
3. “Two Time Loser” — Joe Montgomery
4. “She is My Dream” — The Tads
5. “Four in the Morning” — Dave Moore
6. “A Better Man Than Me” — Gary Trexler
7. “Start at the Bottom” — The Newton Brothers
8. “Plaything” — Ted Newman

Side B (1960–64)

1. “How Many Times” — Patti Lasalle
2. “Night Creatures” — The Gigolo's
3. “You’ll Never Wear a Halo” — Nick Landers
4. “Do It Twist” — Ritchie Hart and His Hartbeats
5. “Drifting Heart” — Roosevelt Nettles
6. “Old Enough to Have a Broken Heart” — Judy Lunn
7. “Cookin” — Al Casey Combo

Side C (1964–67)

1. “My World” — Waylon Jennings
2. “I’m Glad I Knew You” — P-Nut Butter
3. “What’s Happening” — Phil & The Frantics
4. “Boo Hoo” — Donnie Owens
5. “One More Time” — Tommy Strange
6. “Once Upon a Time” — Sanford Clark
7. “So Goes My Dream” — Nadine Jansen

Side D (1968–73)

1. “Happy Just to Be Alive” — Christopher Blue
2. “Too Good To Be True” — Lon Rogers & The Soul Blenders
3. “Get Up” — The Harvey Truitt & Jack Miller Project
4. “One Afternoon” — Motion
5. "The Soul Blenders” — Blending Soul
6. “Ain’t No Time for Stopping’” — Fat City
7. “Loaded Back” — Michael Liggins & The Supersouls

=== Production ===
- Mastering - Telegraph Mastering by Adam Gonsalves
- Design - Always with Honor
- Manufacturing - Cascade Record Pressing
- Executive Producers - David Hilker, Jeff Freundlich
- Co-Producer / Collaborator - Marmoset
