= Eddie Newman (disambiguation) =

Eddie Newman may refer to:

- Eddy Newman (born 1953), former member of the European Parliament
- Eddie Newman (horse racing), Supreme Novices' Hurdle
- Eddie Newman, political aide, List of John McCain presidential campaign staff members, 2008

== See also ==
- Edward Newman (disambiguation)
