= Philip Levy =

Phil or Philip Levy may refer to:

- Phil Levy, American discus thrower in 1937 and 1938 USA Outdoor Track and Field Championships
- Philip Marcus Levy (1934–2011), English psychologist
- Philip Levy (cricketer) (born 1943), South African player for Border
- Phil Levy, American economist on List of John McCain 2008 presidential campaign staff members
- Philip Levy (historian), American archeologist since 1990s
