= List of John McCain 2008 presidential campaign staff members =

John McCain was the Republican Party candidate for President of the United States in 2008. His campaign manager Rick Davis projected at one point that his staff would eventually increase to about 450. By early July 2008, it had opened 11 regional offices in key states and some 84 offices total across the country in a joint effort with the Republican National Committee.

== National leadership team ==
Persons listed on the John McCain for President website:

- Former Secretary of Commerce Robert Mosbacher – Chairman
- Frederic V. Malek – Finance Director
- Jill Hazelbaker – Spokeswoman

== Inner circle ==
According to New York Times reporter John M. Broder:

- Steve Schmidt, head of campaign from July 2, 2008, veteran campaign manager
- Rick Davis, ran McCain's 2000 campaign
- Bill McInturff, chief pollster
- Mark Salter, McCain's Senate chief of staff
- John Weaver, chief political analyst (left campaign in 2007)
- Trevor Potter, chief counsel

Others joining later or listed in other sources include:

- Charles R. Black, Jr., senior political adviser
- Carly Fiorina, former CEO of Hewlett Packard

== The Bush team ==
- Wayne L. Berman, lobbyist and Bush fund-raiser
- Mark McKinnon, Bush's media consultant
- Terry Nelson, Bush's political director 2004 campaign
- Gerald L. Parsky, California chairman, Bush's 2000 and 2004 campaigns
- Nicolle Wallace, née Nicolle Devenish, White House communications director
- Ron Weiser, Ambassador to Slovakia and Bush fund-raiser

== Policy advisers ==
- Dan L. Crippen, director, Congressional Budget Office 1999–2003
- Douglas Holtz-Eakin, director, Congressional Budget Office 2003–2005
- Kevin Hassett, economist, American Enterprise Institute
- Lisa Graham Keegan, Arizona education official
- John Thain, CEO, Merrill Lynch

== Foreign policy advisers ==
In October 2007, the Washington Post listed the following as McCain's foreign policy advisers.

- Randy Scheunemann, national security aide to then-Senate Majority Leaders Bob Dole and Trent Lott and now a lobbyist, defense and foreign policy coordinator (for this cycle and 2000)"
- Richard L. Armitage, "President George W. Bush's deputy secretary of state and an international business consultant and lobbyist, informal foreign policy adviser"; [24] deputy to former secretary of state Colin Powell
- Bernard Aronson, former Assistant Secretary of State for Inter-American affairs; currently managing partner of private equity investment company ACON Investments
- William L. Ball III, Secretary of the Navy during President Reagan's administration, and managing director of lobbying firm the Loeffler Group
- Stephen E. Biegun, Aspen Strategy Group, Council on Foreign Relations, Council of the Americas, former national security aide to then-Sen. Bill Frist, currently VP international affairs, Ford Motors
- Steven Bogden, speechwriter
- Max Boot, Council on Foreign Relations, former Wall Street Journal editor
- Brig. Gen. Tom Bruner
- Lorne W. Craner
- Lawrence Eagleburger, Secretary of State under George H. W. Bush, now a senior public policy adviser with law firm Baker Donelson
- Brig. Gen. Russ Eggers
- Maj. Gen. Merrill Evans
- Niall Ferguson, Harvard historian and Hoover Institution senior fellow
- Michael Jonathan Green, former Asia adviser to President George W. Bush and now Japan chair at the Center for Strategic and International Studies
- Gen. Alexander M. Haig, Jr., Secretary of State under Reagan
- Maj. Gen. Evan "Curly" Hultman
- Robert Kagan, senior associate with the Carnegie Endowment for International Peace
- Brig. Gen. Robert Michael Kimmitt, current deputy Treasury secretary
- Henry A. Kissinger, Secretary of State under Richard Nixon
- Col. Andrew F. Krepinevich, President of the Center for Strategic and Budgetary Assessments
- William Kristol, editor, The Weekly Standard
- Adm. Charles R. Larson
- Robert McFarlane, National Security Adviser under Ronald Reagan
- Brig. Gen. Warren "Bud" Nelson
- Brig. Gen. Eddie Newman
- Maj. Gen. John Peppers
- Maj. Ralph Peters
- Brig. Gen. Maurice Phillips
- Gen. Colin Powell, Secretary of State (2001–2005)
- Kori Schake Research fellow at Stanford University's Hoover Institution
- James R. Schlesinger, "President Nixon and President Ford's secretary of defense, energy and national security adviser"[24]
- Gary Schmitt, former staff director of the Senate Intelligence Committee, currently American Enterprise Institute scholar
- Lt. Gen. Brent Scowcroft, National Security Adviser to Presidents Ford and George H. W. Bush and founder of business consultancy the Scowcroft Group
- George P. Shultz, Secretary of State under Ronald Reagan
- Brig. Gen. W.L. "Bill" Wallace
- Maj. Gen. Gary Wattnem
- R. James Woolsey, former CIA director, now a VP at Booz Allen Hamilton

Other advisers:

- Lisa Curtis

== Economic policy advisers ==
From a July 12, 2007 press release:

- Grant Aldonas — Managing Director for Split Rock International; former Undersecretary for International Trade at the U.S. Department of Commerce
- Carlos Bonilla — Senior Vice President for The Washington Group; former Special Assistant To President George W. Bush; a lobbyist
- Jeff Brown — Associate Professor of Finance at the College of Business, University of Illinois at Urbana-Champaign
- Juan Buttari — Independent consultant and researcher In development economics
- Kathleen Bell Cooper — Dean, College of Business, University of North Texas
- Steve Davis — CRA International and University of Chicago Graduate School of Business
- Richard Dekaser — Senior VP and Chief Economist, National City Corporation
- John Diamond — Edward A. and Hermena Hancock Kelly Fellow in Tax Policy, Baker Institute of Public Policy, Rice University
- Emil Frankel — Transportation Consultant and Former Assistant Secretary for Transportation Policy, Department of Transportation
- Luke Froeb — Professor, Vanderbilt University
- Kevin Hassett — Resident Scholar and Director of Economic Policy Studies, American Enterprise Institute (AEI)
- Greg Jenner — former Executive Vice President, American Council of Life Insurers and Acting Assistant Secretary (Tax Policy), U.S. Treasury Department
- David John — Senior Research Fellow, The Heritage Foundation
- Tim Kane — Director, Center for International Trade and Economics, The Heritage Foundation
- Melissa Kearney — Assistant Professor of Economics, University of Maryland, College Park
- Anne Krueger — Professor at The Johns Hopkins School of Advanced International Studies (SAIS) and Former First Deputy Managing Director at the International Monetary Fund
- Adam Lerrick — Visiting Scholar for the American Enterprise Institute (AEI) and Friends of Allan H. Meltzer Professor of Economics for Carnegie Mellon
- Phil Levy — Resident Scholar for the American Enterprise Institute (AEI) and Former Senior Economist for Trade on the President's Council of Economic Advisers
- Will Melick — Gensemer Associate Professor of Economics, Kenyon College
- Michael Owen Moore — Professor of Economics and International Affairs, George Washington University
- Thomas P. Miller — Resident Fellow for American Enterprise Institute (AEI)
- Tim Muris — Foundation Professor, George Mason University School of Law
- Gerry Parsky — Senior Economic Adviser
- Nancy Pfotenhauer — Former President, Independent Women's Forum
- James Rill — Partner, Howrey LLP and Former Assistant Attorney General (Antitrust), U.S. Department of Justice
- Kenneth Rogoff — Professor of Public Policy, Harvard University
- Harvey S. Rosen — Professor of Economics and Business Policy, Princeton University
- John Silvia — Managing Director, Chief Economist, Wachovia Bank
- Acquiles Suarez — Vice President for Government Affairs for National Association of Industrial and Office Properties and former Special Assistant to the President for Domestic Policy
- John B. Taylor — Professor of Economics at Stanford, Senior Fellow at the Hoover Institution and Former Under Secretary of Treasury
- Anthony Villamil Chief Executive Officer, The Washington Economics Group and Former Under Secretary of Commerce for Economic Affairs
- Joseph Wright — Chairman of the Board of Intelsat
- Mark Zandi — Chief Economist for Moody's Analytics (formerly known as Moody's Economy.Com)
- James Rill — Antitrust attorney at Howrey LLP; Former Assistant Attorney General in charge of the U.S. Department of Justice's Antitrust Division
- Sean O'Keefe — former Secretary of the Navy, NASA Administrator, and Deputy Director of Office of Management and Budget, The White House
- Matthew Lockwood — Director of Contributions Processed

== National Campaign co-chairs ==
- John Chambers, California
- Gov. Jon Huntsman Jr., Utah
- Gov. Tim Pawlenty, Minnesota
- Former Gov. Tom Ridge, Pennsylvania
- Former Senator Warren Rudman, New Hampshire
- Frederick W. Smith, Tennessee
- Charlie Condon, South Carolina

== National Finance Committee co-chairs ==
- Former Rep. George Argyros, California
- Michael Ashner, New York
- Brian D. Ballard, Florida (lobbyist)
- Lawrence E. Bathgate II, New Jersey
- Wayne Berman, Washington, D.C.
- Donald L. Bren, California
- John Chambers, California
- James A. Courter, New Jersey
- Donald R. Diamond, Arizona
- Ray Dalio, Connecticut
- Lewis M. Eisenberg, New Jersey
- Jon Hammes, Wisconsin
- James B. Lee, Jr., New York
- John A. Moran, Florida
- Carter Pate, Virginia
- A. Jerrold Perenchio, California
- Frederick W. Smith, Tennessee
- J. Gary Shansby, California
- John Thain of Merrill Lynch; New York
- Ronald Weiser, Michigan

== Former members ==
- Senator Phil Gramm – General Co-chair, resigned July 18 after remarks calling Americans "whiners"
- Robert Zoellick
- Tom Loeffler
- Susan E. Nelson, "continued to collect payments from [the Loeffler Group] this year while she was on the McCain-campaign payroll as its fund-raising coordinator" The Loeffler Group is a lobbying firm that has "received $990,000 in lobbying fees and another $3,000 in expenses from the Saudi government".
- Mark McKinnon, citing a pledge not to work against an Obama candidacy.
- Doug Davenport and Doug Goodyear of the DCI Group resigned on May 10, 2008, after revelation of DCI's ties to the Myanmar military junta. Davenport, the regional campaign manager for the mid-Atlantic states, founded the DCI Group's lobbying practice and oversaw the contract with Myanmar in 2002. Goodyear was asked to become convention CEO after campaign manager Rick Davis's lobbying firm partner, Paul Manafort, was nixed because of his own close ties to foreign governments and controversial companies
- Carlos Bonilla, economic policy adviser. Left in May 2008 after the campaign imposed new rules restricting the involvement of lobbyists.
- Michael P. Dennehy, national political director and founder of the political consulting and lobbying firm The Dennehy Group. Left in May 2007 explaining that his family obligations conflicted with his arduous, 24/7 political job in Washington, D.C.

== See also ==
- List of Barack Obama presidential campaign staff members, 2008
