= David Tell =

American journalist

David Tell is an American conservative political journalist. Tell served as a speechwriter in the Reagan presidency, and as an aide to William J. Bennett when he was Secretary of Education. In the presidential election of 1992, Tell was director of The Opposition Research Group for the Republican National Committee, in charge of a massive data base devoted to voter research and opposition research, contributing to the unsuccessful candidacy of incumbent George H. W. Bush against Gov. Bill Clinton. Tell was a co-founder of the Project for the Republican Future, a high-level advocacy group modeled on the Democratic Leadership Council. He later was opinion editor of The Weekly Standard magazine, owned by Rupert Murdoch and the News Corporation, from 1995 to 2006.

Tell earned a B. A. in journalism from Columbia University in 1982. He lives in Bethesda, Maryland, with his wife and two sons.
