= Robert Gibbs =

27th White House Press Secretary

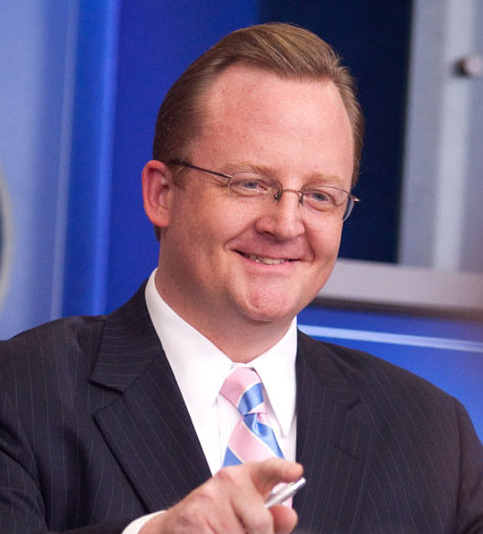

27th White House Press Secretary
- In office January 20, 2009 – February 11, 2011
- President: Barack Obama
- Deputy: Jen Psaki; Bill Burton
- Preceded by: Dana Perino
- Succeeded by: Jay Carney

Personal details
- Born: Robert Lane Gibbs; March 29, 1971 (age 55) Auburn, Alabama, U.S.
- Party: Democratic
- Spouse: Mary Gibbs
- Children: 1
- Education: North Carolina State University (BA)

Robert Lane Gibbs (born March 29, 1971) is an American communication professional who served as executive vice president and global chief communications officer of McDonald's from 2015 to 2019 and as the 27th White House press secretary from 2009 to 2011.

As executive vice president, Gibbs was in charge of public relations at McDonald's. Before McDonald's, Gibbs was an American political advisor and commentator, who served as White House Press Secretary during the first term of the Obama administration. Gibbs had worked with Obama since 2004 and previously served as the communications director for then-senator Obama and his campaign during the 2008 presidential election. He later served as a senior campaign adviser for Obama's campaign during the 2012 presidential election.

Prior to becoming a member of the Obama team he was press secretary for John Kerry's 2004 presidential campaign and was a part of several Senate campaigns, having served as communications director for the Democratic Senatorial Campaign Committee and for four individual Senate campaigns, including those of Obama in 2004 and Fritz Hollings in 1998. Gibbs was also the press secretary of Representative Bob Etheridge. Gibbs was announced as the press secretary for President Obama on November 22, 2008, and officially assumed the role on January 20, 2009, giving his first official briefing on January 22. In 2024, he joined Warner Brothers Discovery as communications chief.

== Early life and education ==
Gibbs was born in Auburn, Alabama. His parents, Nancy Jean (née Lane) and Robert Coleman Gibbs, worked in the Auburn University library system and involved their son in politics at an early age. Nancy Gibbs would take Robert, then known as "Bobby," to local League of Women Voters meetings rather than hire a babysitter, and involved him in "voter re-identification" work at the county courthouse.

Gibbs attended Auburn City Schools and Auburn High School. At Auburn High, Gibbs played saxophone in the Auburn High School Band, was a goalkeeper on the Tigers' soccer team, and participated in the school's debate squad. Gibbs graduated from Auburn High in 1989, in the same class as novelist Ace Atkins and LEGO artist Eric Harshbarger.

Gibbs attended North Carolina State University, serving as goalkeeper for the North Carolina State Wolfpack soccer team from 1990 to 1992. Gibbs graduated from North Carolina State cum laude with a B.A. in Political Science in 1993.

While a student at North Carolina State in 1991, Gibbs became an intern for Alabama's 3rd congressional district Congressman Glen Browder. Gibbs quickly rose through the ranks of Browder's staff, rising to become the representative's executive assistant in Washington, D.C. Gibbs returned to Alabama in 1996 to work on Browder's unsuccessful Senate campaign that year.

== Career ==
=== Congressional Press Secretary, 1997 ===
In 1997, Gibbs was press secretary for Congressman Bob Etheridge of North Carolina and, in 1998, was spokesman for Senator Fritz Hollings' successful re-election campaign. He worked in the campaigns of two other senators, and served as communications director for the Democratic Senatorial Campaign Committee, before taking the position of press secretary of John Kerry's 2004 presidential campaign.

=== 2004 U.S. Presidential election ===
Early in the 2004 presidential campaign, Gibbs was the press secretary of Democratic candidate John Kerry. On November 11, 2003, Gibbs resigned from Kerry's campaign after the candidate abruptly fired his campaign manager, Jim Jordan. Gibbs was replaced by Stephanie Cutter, a former spokeswoman for Ted Kennedy. After leaving the Kerry campaign, Gibbs became spokesman for a 527 political group formed to stop the presidential campaign of Howard Dean. For his involvement in this group, Gibbs was criticized during the Obama presidential campaign by some left leaning bloggers.

=== Advisor to Senator Barack Obama, 2004 ===
Gibbs joined Barack Obama's 2004 U.S. Senate campaign as communications director in mid-April 2004 and remained with the senator through the first two years of Obama's term. Gibbs is credited with guiding Obama through those first years and molding his rise on the national scene. According to The New York Times, Gibbs advised Obama on politics, strategy and messaging, and spent more time with Obama than any other advisor.

=== 2008 U.S. Presidential election ===
The appointment of Gibbs by Obama to the post of Communications Chief was met with mild controversy by some critics in the Democratic National Committee, who cited Gibbs' role in the aggressive campaign tactics used to block the nomination of Howard Dean in the 2004 race. Obama, however, referred to Gibbs as his "one-person Southern focus group" and welcomed him as part of his close-knit team that included strategist David Axelrod, campaign director David Plouffe, and research director Devorah Adler. In his communications role, Gibbs became known as "the enforcer" because of his aggressive rapid-response methods for countering disinformation tactics from opponents. Gibbs assumed responsibility for "shaping the campaign message, responding to the 24/7 news cycle, schmoozing with the press and fighting back when he disagree[d] with its reporting." As the chief intermediary between the Obama campaign and the press, Gibbs sought to counter the Republican National Committee's opposition research tactics against Obama in early 2007.

Gibbs adopted a policy of rapid response to claims by conservative news outlets that questioned Obama's religious upbringing. In response to the "Obama is a Muslim" meme suggested by these claims, Gibbs disseminated information to other news networks that Obama is not nor has ever been Muslim. At the time, Gibbs said, "These malicious, irresponsible charges are precisely the kind of politics the American people have grown tired of."

After comments by George W. Bush to the Israeli Knesset questioning Obama's foreign policy platform's focus on international diplomacy, Gibbs responded, calling Bush's comments "astonishing" and "an unprecedented attack on foreign soil." Gibbs argued that Bush's policy amounted to "cowboy diplomacy" that had been discounted by Bush's own Secretary of Defense, Robert Gates, and quoted with Gates' own words: "We need to figure out a way to develop some leverage ... and then sit down and talk...if there is going to be a discussion, then they need something, too. We can't go to a discussion and be completely the demander, with them not feeling that they need anything from us."

He was widely blamed by news media executives for "holding hostage" reporters, while Obama and Hillary Clinton met for the first time after a heavily contested Democratic primary season. He countered back, "It wasn't an attempt to deceive in any way ... It was just private meetings."

=== White House Press Secretary, 2008 ===
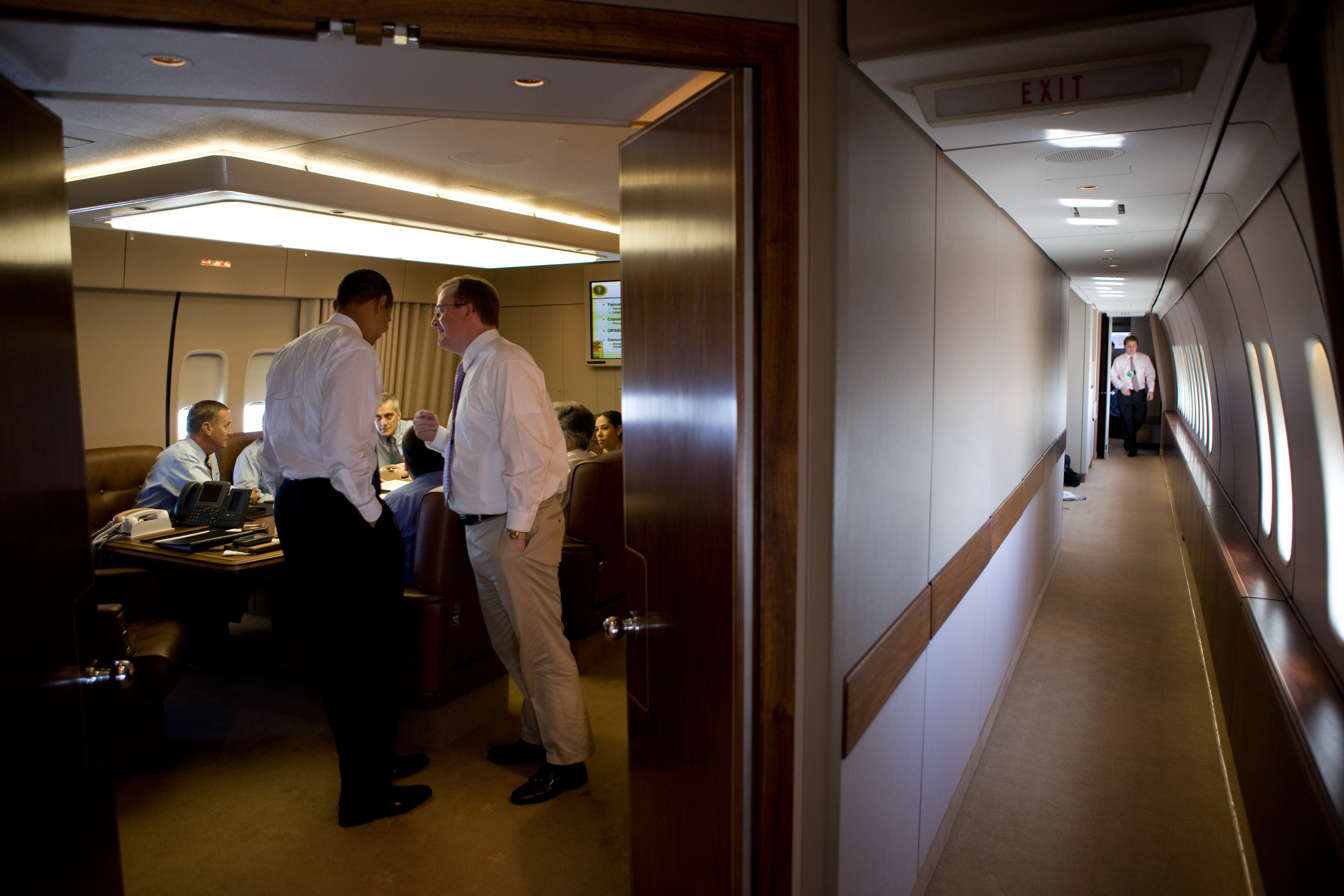
Obama and Gibbs in the conference room of Air Force One in July 2009

On 22 November 2008, it was announced by the Obama transition team that Gibbs would be the White House Press Secretary for the Obama administration. He assumed the role of press secretary on 20 January 2009, and gave his first official briefing on January 22, 2009.

In an interview with The Hill, Gibbs derided the "professional left" and "liberals," who "wouldn't be satisfied if Dennis Kucinich was president." He said that people who compare Obama's policies to George W. Bush's "ought to be drug tested."

Gibbs stirred controversy when he stated that the drone killing of 16-year-old son of Anwar al-Awlaki was justified, and that the boy "should [have] had a more responsible father."

On 5 January 2011, Gibbs announced that he would leave the White House to become an outside adviser to the Administration. He formally left the position on February 11, 2011.

=== Post-government career, 2013–present ===
On February 12, 2013, it was announced that Gibbs had been hired as a contributor for cable news channel MSNBC. His first appearance was on the same night prior to the 2013 State of the Union Address. In June 2012, Gibbs was appointed to the board of directors of Yelp. In June 2013, it was announced that Gibbs and Ben LaBolt co-founded a strategic communications practice called The Incite Agency, where he was a partner until 2015. He left Incite in 2015 to become chief communications officer for McDonald's Corporation, an office he held until his departure from the company in October 2019. In March 2020, he became senior counsel at Bully Pulpit Interactive, which had acquired The Incite Agency in 2016.

In August 2020, Gibbs became a third co-host of the U.S. political podcast "Hacks On Tap", joining David Axelrod and Mike Murphy. In June 2024, Gibbs was announced as Head of Communications for Warner Bros. Discovery.

== Personal life ==
Gibbs was married to Mary Catherine Gibbs, an attorney, and lived in Alexandria, Virginia with their son, Ethan. He owns a vineyard in Oregon with his partner Ann Yu. His parents live in Apex, North Carolina, where his mother Nancy is acquisitions director for Duke University Libraries.

Political offices
Preceded by Dana Perino	White House Press Secretary; 2009–2011	Succeeded by Jay Carney
