= The Fool (Sanford Clark song) =

Single by Sanford Clark
- B-side: "Lonesome for a Letter"
- Released: June 1956
- Genre: Rockabilly
- Length: 2:42
- Label: Dot
- Songwriters: Naomi Ford, Lee Hazlewood

Sanford Clark singles chronology
"The Fool" (1956)	"Usta Be My Baby" (1956)

"The Fool" is a song written by Naomi Ford and Lee Hazlewood and performed by Sanford Clark. It reached No. 5 on the U.S. R&B chart, No. 7 on the U.S. pop chart, and No. 14 on the U.S. country chart in 1956.

Al Casey played guitar on the record and it was ranked No. 42 on Billboard magazine's Top 50 singles of 1956.

== Other charting versions ==
- The Gallahads, reaching No. 62 on the U.S. pop chart in 1956.
- Don Gibson, hitting No. 22 on the U.S. country chart in 1978.

== Other versions ==
- Edna McGriff in 1956; her single did not chart.
- Joe Seneca on his 1956 EP.
- Mac Wiseman on his 1960 album Mac Wiseman Sings 12 Great Hits.
- Johnny Burnette on his 1961 album Johnny Burnette Sings.
- Bob Luman put out a single in 1962; it did not make the charts.
- Bonnie Guitar's single in 1963 did not chart.
- Johnny Kidd & The Pirates' recorded two versions - the first was in the beat group style in 1964, for an album that was subsequently aborted. This track has been issued on various compilations since the 1980s.
- Chris Farlowe in 1965; this did not make singles charts
- Johnny Kidd & the Pirates as the B-side to their 1966 single "Send for That Girl".
- Bobby Bare on his 1970 album This is Bare Country.
- Roger Miller on his 1970 album 1970.
- Elvis Presley on his 1971 album Elvis Country (I'm 10,000 Years Old).
- The Animals (credited as The Original Animals) released a version on their 1977 reunion album Before We Were So Rudely Interrupted.
- Robert Gordon as the B-side to his 1977 single "Endless Sleep".
- Johnny Lee on his 1984 album Til' the Bars Burn Down
- Mano Negra on their 1991 album King of Bongo.
- Bedlam on their 1999 compilation album Anthology.
- Richard Thompson on his 2003 album 1000 Years of Popular Music.
- The Iveys on their 2017 live album Badfinger Origins: The Iveys Anthology, Volume 1 – Live at The Empire, June 7, 1966, Neath, South Wales.
