= Edward Newman =

Edward Newman may refer to:

- Edward A. Newman (1853–1909), American businessman
- Edward Newman (entomologist) (1801–1876), English entomologist, botanist and writer
- Edward Newman (New Zealand politician) (1858–1946), Reform Party Member of Parliament
- Edward Newman (Australian politician) (1832–1872), businessman and accountant in colonial Western Australia
- Edward Newman (political scientist), British political scientist
- Eddy Newman (born 1953), former member of the European Parliament
- Ed Newman (born 1951), offensive guard

== See also ==
- Eddie Newman (disambiguation)
- Ted Newman (disambiguation)
