= Opposition Research Group =

The Opposition Research Group (ORG) refers to the division within the Republican National Committee formed in 1984 with its own budget of $1.1 million, to create a master data bank of computerized voter research and opposition research. ORG staff amassed data on eight Democratic presidential candidates, sourced from voting records, Congressional Record speeches, media clippings and transcripts, and campaign materials. In this way, the RNC was able to track inconsistencies of its opponents for use in political campaigns. This data base evolved into a network that linked information gleaned by Republicans in all 50 states, creating a master data base accessible to high-ranking Republican staff, even aboard Air Force One when Ronald Reagan was president.

In the 1992 presidential election, independent candidate Ross Perot repeatedly accused the Republicans of "dirty tricks" and spying on him, but Republicans dismissed Perot's accusations as a "paranoid fantasy." David Tell, who headed ORG at the time said, "Mr. Perot is suggesting we are sitting here in the middle of this great spider web, calling newspaper reporters and planting these things, and that is baloney."
