= Sanford Clark =

American rockabilly singer (1935–2021)

- Born: October 24, 1935; Tulsa, Oklahoma, U.S.
- Died: July 4, 2021 (aged 85) Joplin, Missouri, U.S.
- Genres: Rockabilly, country
- Years active: 1955–1969
- Formerly of: Lee Hazlewood

Sanford Clark (October 24, 1935 – July 4, 2021) was an American country-rockabilly singer and guitarist, best known for his 1956 hit "The Fool".

== Biography ==
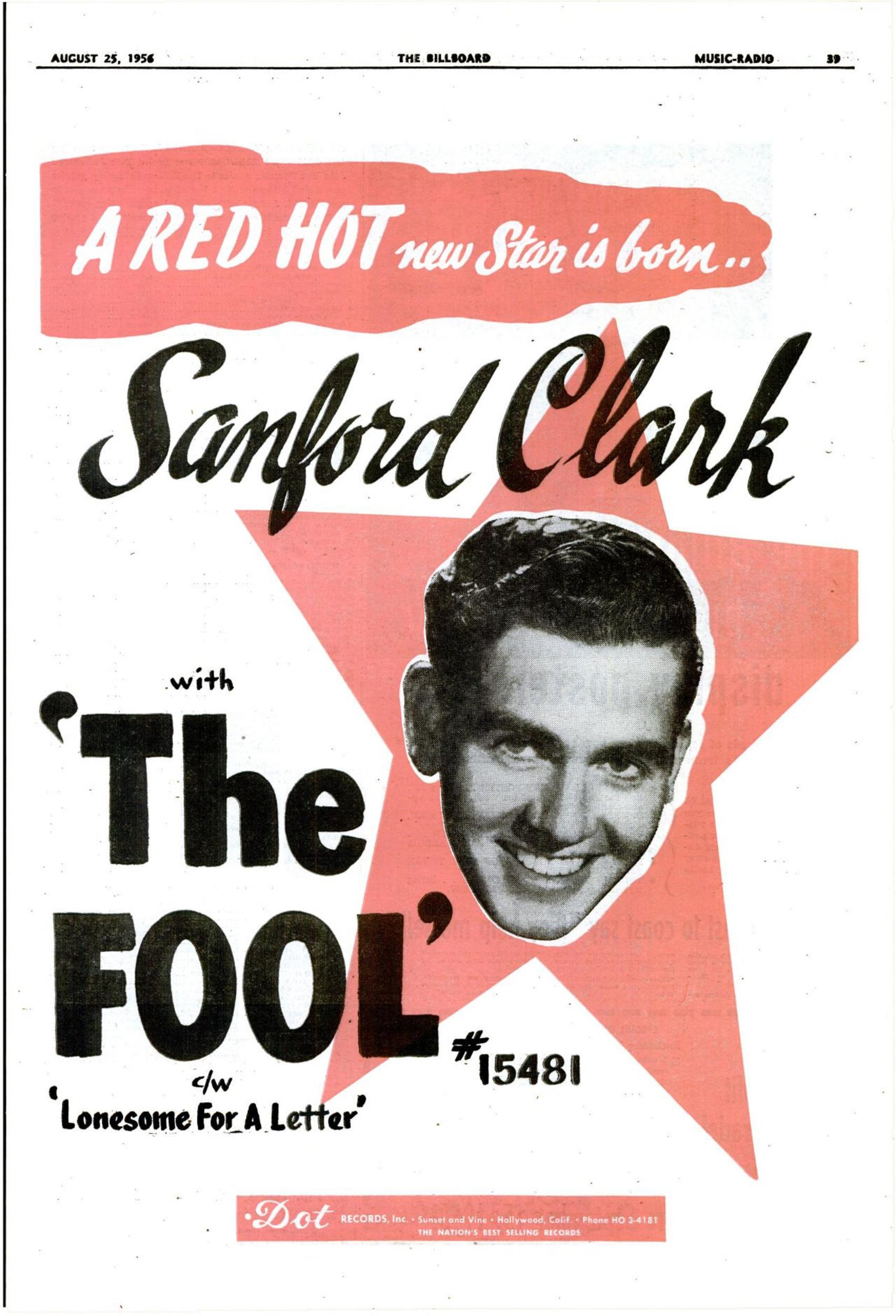
Advertisement featured in Billboard magazine, 25 August 1956

Clark was born in Tulsa, Oklahoma, and was raised in Phoenix, Arizona, from the age of nine. He first began performing in the Phoenix area in the early 1950s. He spent time in the Air Force in the South Pacific; he formed a band there which won a talent show in Hawaii. Returning to Phoenix, he and his friend Al Casey met Lee Hazlewood, then a local DJ. Clark, with Casey on guitar, recorded one of Hazlewood's songs, "The Fool", in Floyd Ramsey's Audio Recorders studio on MCI Records in 1956. Dot Records picked the song up for national distribution after a Philadelphia deejay tipped them off. The song became a hit in the U.S., peaking at No. 14 on the Country Singles chart, No. 5 on the R&B Singles chart, and No. 7 on the Billboard Top 100. Following the song's success, Clark opened on tour for Ray Price and Roy Orbison.

Clark's 1957 follow-up single, "A Cheat", gave him a second minor hit, peaking at No. 74 Pop. He and Dot Records' owner Randy Wood quarreled over the singer's image, and he eventually signed to Jamie Records in 1958, continuing to work with Hazlewood. In 1959 Clark recorded a song, "Son of a Gun", about the son of a western gunslinger. This song is also referenced in Keith Richards' book Life, published in October 2010. He credits the song as being one of the first songs he learned and performed on stage prior to forming the Rolling Stones.

Moving to Hollywood, he recorded for several other labels and had several almost-comebacks; his 1964 version of Hazlewood's "Houston" was eclipsed by Dean Martin's version, and in 1965 he re-recorded "The Fool" with Waylon Jennings on guitar. Hazlewood, by now an established songwriter, signed Clark to his own label, LHI, on which Clark released "The Black Widow" b/w "The Son of Hickory Holler's Tramp" in 1967, and "Farm Labor Camp #2" and the album Return of the Fool in 1968.

A few years later Clark left the music business and worked in construction, though he occasionally recorded in later decades on his own label, Desert Sun Records.

On July 4 2021 Clark's publicist and fellow performer, Johnny Vallis, said that Clark died at Mercy Hospital in Joplin, Missouri, where he had been receiving cancer treatment before contracting COVID-19 amidst the COVID-19 pandemic in Missouri, according to NewsTalk KZRG radio.

== TV and film ==
Clark's most popular and well-known song, "The Fool", was featured in the Netflix film Win It All (2017) and the Focus Features film Dallas Buyers Club (2013). His song "Calling All Hearts" has been played in various TV and film productions including the NBC series Aquarius: Episode 107, the ABC series Nashville: Episode 310, the FXX series It's Always Sunny in Philadelphia: Episode 1209, and in the 20th Century Fox film, Walking with Dinosaurs (2013). His song "The Big Lie" was featured in the FX series Justified: Episode 409, in the Freestyle Releasing film From the Rough (2011), and in Sony Pictures Home Entertainment film The Driftless Area (2015). "Bad Case of You" was featured in the Amazon Studios series Transparent episodes 308 and 310.

== Discography ==
=== 1950s ===
Date: Title	Record label	Details
1955: "The Fool"	MCI Records / Dot Records	7", Single, 10", Shellac
1956: "The Fool" / "Bad Luck"	London Records / Reo Records	10", Shellac
1956: "9lb. Hammer" / "Ooo Baby"	Dot Records	7", Single, 10", Shellac
1956: "A Cheat" / "Usta Be My Baby"	Dot Records	7", Single, 10", Shellac
1957: "The Glory of Love" / "Darling Dear"	Dot Records	7", Single
1957: "Lou Be Doo" / "Love Charms"	Dot Records	7", Single
1957: "Swanee River Rock" / "The Man Who Made an Angel Cry"	Dot Records	7", Single
1958: Presenting Sanford Clark	London Records	7", EP
1958: "Modern Romance"	Dot Records	7", Single
1959: "Still As the Night"	Jamie Records / Reo Records	7", Single
1959: "Run, Boy Run"	London Records / London American Recordings	7", Single, 4 P, Tri
1959: "Son-of-a-Gun"	London Records / London American Recordings	7", Single
1959: "My Jealousy"	Jamie Records	7"

=== 1960s ===
Date: Title	Record label	Details
1960: "Go On Home" / "Pledging My Love"	London Records / London American Recordings	7" Single / Promo
1961: "Guess It's Love" / "It Hurts Me Too"	Trey Records	7" Single
1964: "She Taught Me" / "Just Bluesin'"	Warner Bros. Records	7" Single / Promo
1965: "Houston" / "Hard Feelings"	Warner Bros. Records	7" Single / Promo
1966: "The Fool" / "Step Aside"	Ramco Records	7" Single / Promo
1966: "Shades" / "Once Upon a Time"	Ramco Records	7" Single / Promo
1966: "It's Nothing To Me" / "Calling All Hearts"	Ramco Records	7" Single / Promo
1967: "The Black Widow Spider" / "The Son of Hickory Holler's Tramp"	LHI Records	7" Single / Promo
1967: "(They Call Me) Country" / "Climbin' The Walls"	Ramco Records	7" Single / Promo
1968: "Farm Labor Camp #2" / "Love Me Till Then"	LHI Records	7" Promo
1968: They Call Me Country	Ember Records	Cassette / Album / LP
1968: Return of The Fool	LHI Records	Album / LP

=== 1970s ===
Date: Title	Record label	Details
1975: Modern Romance	Do-Ja Records	LP, Compilation

=== 1980s ===
Date: Title	Record label	Details
1983: The Fool	Ace Records	LP, Compilation, Mono
1986: Rockin' Rollin' Vol. 1	Bear Family Records	LP, Compilation
1986: Rockin' Rollin' Vol. 2 (The Complete Dot & Jamie Recordings, Vol. 2)	Bear Family Records	LP, Compilation
1988: Sanford Clark / The Crickets - "The Fool" / "It's So Easy!"	American Pie Records	7", Single, RE, Mono

=== 1990s ===
Date: Title	Record label	Details
1992: The Fool	Bear Family Records	CD, Compilation
1993: Shades	Bear Family Records	CD, Compilation

=== 2010s ===
Date: Title	Record label	Details
2014: Waylon Jennings / Sanford Clark - Zia Records Presents: Audio Recorders Archive Vol. 1	Zia Records	
2016: Once Upon a Time	Fervor Records	
2017: Mid-Century Sounds: Deep Cuts From the Desert	Fervor Records	Compilation

=== Unknown date ===
Date: Title	Record label	Details
Unknown: "The Fool" / "A Cheat"	Collectables, MCA Special Markets & Products	7", Single
Unknown: Sanford Clark / Robin Luke - "The Fool" / "Susie Darlin'"	Underground Records	7", RE
Unknown: Sanford Clark / Ocean - "The Fool" / "Put Your Hand in The Hand"	Underground Records	7", Single
