= Confirmation (film) =

2016 film by Rick Famuyiwa

- Television release poster
- Written by: Susannah Grant
- Directed by: Rick Famuyiwa
- Starring: Kerry Washington; Wendell Pierce; Greg Kinnear; Jeffrey Wright; Eric Stonestreet; Bill Irwin; Zoe Lister-Jones; Grace Gummer; Treat Williams; Dylan Baker; Erika Christensen; Jennifer Hudson
- Theme music composer: Harry Gregson-Williams
- Country of origin: United States
- Original language: English

Production
- Producer: Darren M. Demetre
- Cinematography: Rachel Morrison
- Editor: Dirk Westervelt
- Running time: 110 minutes
- Production companies: HBO Films; Groundswell Productions; ABC Signature

Original release
- Network: HBO
- Release: April 16, 2016

Confirmation is a 2016 American television political thriller film, directed by Rick Famuyiwa and written by Susannah Grant. It is about Clarence Thomas's Supreme Court nomination hearings, and the controversy that unfolded when Anita Hill alleged she was sexually harassed by Thomas. It stars Kerry Washington as Hill and Wendell Pierce as Clarence Thomas, with Erika Christensen, Jennifer Hudson, Greg Kinnear, Jeffrey Wright, Bill Irwin, and Eric Stonestreet in supporting roles. The film aired on HBO on April 16, 2016. It received generally positive reviews from critics.

== Plot ==
Anita Hill, a law professor at the University of Oklahoma, is contacted and questioned about Clarence Thomas. Hill, a former employee of Thomas, is prompted to speak about his workplace treatment. Anita Hill tells the Senate Judiciary Committee that, inter alia, Clarence Thomas had spoken to her about pornographic movies and actors such as Long Dong Silver. A psychologist tells a U.S. senator that Anita Hill has erotomania.

A hearing takes place at which Anita tells the Senate Judiciary Committee that, inter alia, Clarence Thomas sexually harassed her 10 years prior. From there, a slew of events unfolds as the Committee tries to determine who is telling the truth, with the world watching. The subpoena to Angela Wright, another accuser of Thomas, is withdrawn.

== Cast ==
- Kerry Washington as Anita Hill
- Wendell Pierce as Clarence Thomas
- Greg Kinnear as Joe Biden, U.S. Senator (D-DE)
- Jeffrey Wright as Charles Ogletree
- Eric Stonestreet as Kenneth Duberstein, former White House Chief of Staff
- Kristen Ariza as Judy Smith, White House Deputy Press Secretary.
- Bill Irwin as John Danforth, U.S. Senator (R-MO)
- Zoe Lister-Jones as Carolyn Hart, aide to Senator Biden
- Grace Gummer as Ricki Seidman, aide to Senator Kennedy
- Dylan Baker as Orrin Hatch, U.S. Senator (R-UT)
- Treat Williams as Ted Kennedy, U.S. Senator (D-MA)
- Erika Christensen as Shirley Wiegand, friend of Anita Hill
- Alison Wright as Ginni Thomas, Thomas' wife
- Malcolm Gets as Arlen Specter, U.S. Senator (R-PA)
- Peter McRobbie as Alan K. Simpson, U.S. Senator (R-WY)
- Kimberly Elise as Sonia Jarvis
- Jennifer Hudson as Angela Wright
- Tom Virtue as Patrick Leahy, U.S. Senator (D-VT)
- Jan Radcliff as Pat Schroeder, U.S. Representative (D-CO)
- Frank Hoyt Taylor as Strom Thurmond, U.S. Senator (R-SC)
- Matthew Hennessy as an aide to U.S. Senator Joseph I. Lieberman
- Michael G Starr as Howell Thomas Heflin, United States Senator from Alabama

== Production ==
=== Casting ===
On March 12, 2015, it was announced that Kerry Washington would star as Anita Hill in an HBO television film. Washington's role on ABC Network's hit television show Scandal was loosely based on Judy Smith, who appears as a character in the film. On April 28, Wendell Pierce was cast as Clarence Thomas. On May 12, Eric Stonestreet joined as Kenneth Duberstein. Greg Kinnear, Jennifer Hudson, and Jeffrey Wright were reported to have joined the cast as Joe Biden, Angela Wright, and Charles Ogletree, respectively, on May 29. On June 5, Bill Irwin and Treat Williams were added, to respectively portray John Danforth and Ted Kennedy. Later that same day, Erika Christensen, Cobie Smulders, Dylan Baker, and Grace Gummer were announced as cast as Shirley Wiegand, Biden aide Harriet Grant, Orrin Hatch, and Ricki Seidman, respectively. On June 16, Kimberly Elise, Kristen Ariza, and Malcolm Gets joined the cast, as Sonia Jarvis, Judy Smith, and Arlen Specter, respectively. On July 2, Daniel Sauli was cast as Mark Paoletta. On July 9, it was reported that Smulders had exited the film due to breaking her leg; Zoe Lister-Jones replaced her in the Harriet Grant role (a composite of aides to Biden).

=== Filming ===
Principal photography began in Atlanta, Georgia on June 14, 2015, and was completed on July 24. Actual news footage taped by CNN of United States Senate staff during the lead-up to the hearings was used, to give the film a more realistic tone.

== Reception ==
The review aggregator website Rotten Tomatoes gave the film an approval rating of 84%, based on 49 reviews, with an average rating of 6.9/10. The site's critical consensus reads, "Stellar performances and gripping subject matter help Confirmation overcome production values that occasionally feel as dated as the infamous real-life case it covers." On Metacritic, the film has a score of 72 out of 100, based on 25 critics, indicating "generally favorable" reviews.

=== Awards and nominations ===
Year	Award	Category	Nominee(s)	Result	Ref.
2016	Critics' Choice Television Awards	Best Movie Made for Television or Limited Series		Nominated	
2016	Critics' Choice Television Awards	Best Actress in a Movie Made for Television or Limited Series	Kerry Washington	Nominated	
2016	Online Film & Television Association Awards	Best Motion Picture		Nominated	
2016	Online Film & Television Association Awards	Best Actress in a Motion Picture or Limited Series	Kerry Washington	Nominated	
2016	Primetime Emmy Awards	Outstanding Television Movie	Michael London, Janice Williams, Kerry Washington, Susannah Grant, and Darren M. Demetre	Nominated	
2016	Primetime Emmy Awards	Outstanding Lead Actress in a Limited Series or Movie	Kerry Washington	Nominated	
2017	Black Reel Awards	Outstanding TV Movie or Mini-Series	Darren M. Demetre	Nominated	
2017	Black Reel Awards	Outstanding Actor, TV Movie or Mini-Series	Wendell Pierce	Nominated	
2017	Black Reel Awards	Outstanding Actress, TV Movie or Mini-Series	Kerry Washington	Won	
2017	Golden Globe Awards	Best Actress – Miniseries or Television Film	Kerry Washington	Nominated	
2017	NAACP Image Awards	Outstanding Television Movie, Limited Series or Dramatic Special		Nominated	
2017	NAACP Image Awards	Outstanding Actor in a Television Movie, Limited Series or Dramatic Special	Jeffrey Wright	Nominated	
2017	NAACP Image Awards	Outstanding Actress in a Television Movie, Limited Series or Dramatic Special	Kerry Washington	Nominated	
2017	NAACP Image Awards	Outstanding Directing in a Motion Picture (Television)	Rick Famuyiwa	Won	
2017	Satellite Awards	Best Miniseries or Motion Picture Made for Television		Nominated	
2017	Satellite Awards	Best Actor in a Miniseries or a Motion Picture Made for Television	Wendell Pierce	Nominated	
2017	Satellite Awards	Best Actress in a Miniseries or a Motion Picture Made for Television	Kerry Washington	Nominated	
2017	Screen Actors Guild Awards	Outstanding Performance by a Female Actor in a Television Movie or Miniseries	Kerry Washington	Nominated	
2017	Writers Guild of America Awards	Long Form – Original	Susannah Grant	Won	
2017	Writers Guild of America Awards	Paul Selvin Award	Susannah Grant	Won	

== Credits ==
During the film credits, the onscreen text states that as a result of Hill's accusation of sexual harassment, more women were elected to public office in 1992 than previous periods, official sexual harassment complaints doubled, and an important workplace discrimination law was passed (referring to the Civil Rights Act of 1991).

== See also ==
- Strange Justice
