= Sam Graham-Felsen =

American blogger and journalist

Samuel Graham-Felsen is an American blogger and journalist who was the blog director of the presidential campaign of Barack Obama in 2008.

== Biography ==
=== Early life ===
Graham-Felsen grew up in Jamaica Plain, a neighborhood in Boston, Massachusetts. He attended Boston public schools, including the William Monroe Trotter school and Boston Latin School. He graduated cum laude from Harvard University in 2004 with a degree in social studies. He was a writer and columnist for The Harvard Crimson, the daily student newspaper of the university.

=== Career ===
From 2004 to 2007, he worked for The Nation magazine, covering youth politics. He also produced videos for Current TV, filing reports from France, Cambodia, and Pakistan.

From 2008 to 2009 he was content director at Blue State Digital, a Washington, D.C.–based Internet strategy and technology firm. He is currently a featured speaker for the American Program Bureau and travels worldwide covering his experience with the Obama campaign and other new media campaigns.

His debut, coming-of-age novel, Green, was published in January, 2018, by Random House. A tale of growing up in Boston as one of few white students in a predominantly Black and Hispanic middle school, his book received praise from The New York Times, The Boston Globe, and the New Yorker, which called it,“A coming-of-age tale of uncommon sweetness and feeling.”

== Obama campaign ==
Graham-Felsen was a member of the presidential campaign staff of Barack Obama in 2008. As the blog director of the New Media committee, he wrote for and oversaw BarackObama.com/blog, worked with key national and state bloggers to promote the campaign's message, helped direct the campaign's online rapid response operation, and produced and collaborated on dozens of online videos for the campaign.

== Personal life ==
Graham-Felsen is married. He lives in New York.
