= Terry Lenzner =

American attorney (1939–2020)

Terry Falk Lenzner
- Born: August 10, 1939; New York City, US
- Died: April 23, 2020 (aged 80); Washington, D.C., US
- Education: Harvard University (B.A., J.D.)
- Occupation: Attorney
- Spouse: Margaret Rood
- Children: 3

Terry Falk Lenzner (August 10, 1939 – April 23, 2020) was an American attorney and founder of Investigative Group International.

== Biography ==
Lenzner was born in Manhattan, the son of Eleanor (Falk), a homemaker, and Joseph Lenzner, a dentist. His paternal grandparents were from Lithuania. He was raised in a secular Jewish family in Manhattan and attended Philips Exeter Academy. He graduated with a B.A. from Harvard University, where he was captain of the football team in 1960, and with a J.D. from Harvard Law School. After school in 1964, following the advice of attorney Lloyd K. Garrison, he worked for the civil rights division of the Justice Department where he investigated the murders of three civil rights workers in Mississippi. He then worked as an assistant U.S. attorney under Bob Morgenthau in the organized crime unit in New York before becoming the director of the federal office of Legal Services in the Richard Nixon administration. In 1971, he served on a team under U.S. Attorney General Ramsey Clark that defended the Harrisburg Seven and in 1973, under Samuel Dash, as the chief counsel on the Senate Watergate Committee.

=== Investigative Group International ===
In 1984, he founded Investigative Group International, an investigation agency with seven offices in the US as well as in London, Sydney, Australia, and Wiesbaden, Germany. IGI activities range from conducting background investigations, corporate takeovers, internal fraud investigations and "opposition research". In 1994, the law firm of Williams & Connolly, which was representing President Bill Clinton, retained his firm to investigate the source of the financing for Paula Jones' sexual misconduct lawsuit against the president. President Clinton also used the firm to investigate monies contributed by Yah Lin "Charlie" Trie to Clinton's legal defense fund.

Although he did work for Republicans at times, he mostly worked for Democrats and was a close personal friend of Clinton lawyer Mickey Kantor. Several former IGI employees have links to the Clinton administration including Ricki Seidman; Interior Department official Brooke Shearer (wife of Clinton's United States Deputy Secretary of State, Strobe Talbott); undersecretary of the Treasury Raymond W. Kelly, and Howard Shapiro, general counsel to the FBI. Independent counsel Kenneth W. Starr subpoenaed Lenzner (along with Sidney Blumenthal) regarding allegations that his firm was paid to find negative information regarding Starr's team and possibly "obstructing justice"; after failing to demonstrate attorney–client privilege, Lenzner testified that his firm was doing "nothing inappropriate" with the research he was doing for Clinton. In 1994, The Clinton administration was criticized for awarding IGI a no-bid grant from the State Department to train police officers in Haiti (sending its then president, former New York City police chief, Raymond Kelly).

Over the years he has been retained by numerous high-profile clients to conduct opposition research. In 1991, the firm was retained in investigating United Way president William Aramony. Also in 1991, Mike Tyson used the firm to investigate the activities of his accusers and whether his jurors acted appropriately. In 1994, he was retained by Senator Ted Kennedy to investigate his opponent, which stoked some controversy when the Kennedy campaign denied employing the firm and when no record of payments to IGI were found. It was discovered that Washington lawyer James Flug had hired IGI and was reimbursed by the campaign. In 1993, he was hired by tobacco giant Brown & Williamson to investigate whistleblower Jeffrey Wigand, however it was found that many of the allegations of misconduct in the dossier he produced appeared to be unsubstantiated or simply trivial. In 1997, the Democratic National Committee used IGI to audit political contributions. In 1996, Republican Senate candidate Robert Monks hired him to investigate his opponent's alleged sexual assault. In 1997, Lenzner was asked to find derogatory information on Republican Senator Don Nickles and his wife; Senator Joseph Lieberman criticized Lenzner's tactics as an "intrusion into the system." Ivana Trump hired him to investigate Donald Trump's relationship with Marla Maples and to determine his financial assets.

== Personal life and death ==
Lenzner was married to Margaret Rood Lenzner; they had three children. His son Jonathan is married to Washington Post writer Matea Gold.

Lenzner died age 80 on April 23, 2020.
