= Ricki Seidman =

American political activist

- Born: Ricki Lynn Seidman; August 24, 1955 (age 70)
- Education: Miami University (BA); University of Georgia (JD)
- Occupations: Political activist, adviser
- Political party: Democratic
- Parent(s): Eileen Joan (née Ladenson) and Frank Seidman

Ricki Lynn Seidman (born August 24, 1955) is an American political adviser, government official, and Democratic Party activist. Seidman is known for her involvement in the Supreme Court confirmation hearings of Robert Bork, Clarence Thomas, Sonia Sotomayor, and Brett Kavanaugh.

Seidman's role in Democratic politics over the past four decades has led her to be represented in media such as the HBO film Confirmation, where she was depicted an as adviser to Anita Hill during the Clarence Thomas Supreme Court nomination.

== Early life and career ==
Seidman was born on August 24, 1955, to a Jewish family, the daughter of Eileen Joan (née Ladenson) and Frank Seidman. She earned a Bachelor of Arts from Miami University and a Juris Doctor from the University of Georgia School of Law.

After graduation, she worked as a senior investigator for the investigation firm, Investigative Group International and later for the People for the American Way.

== Political career ==
=== Presidential politics ===
She has been involved in presidential campaigns beginning with Walter Mondale in 1984, Michael Dukakis in 1988, and Bill Clinton in 1992. Seidman worked for President Clinton as assistant to the president, as the director of scheduling and advance, and as the deputy communications director and assistant to the president. She served as deputy communications director during the Clinton–Gore presidential campaign transition, and worked on the failed nominations of Lani Guinier and Webster Hubbell.

She appeared in the 1993 documentary film about the 1992 Clinton campaign for president, The War Room, and the 2008 film The Return of the War Room documenting Barack Obama's presidential campaign.

=== Supreme Court ===
Seidman worked as an assistant to Senator Ted Kennedy and chief investigator for the Senate Labor and Human Resources Committee where she worked against the Robert Bork (1987) and Clarence Thomas (1990) nominations to the U.S. Supreme Court. Nan Aron from Alliance for Justice asserts that she was the one that tipped Seidman off about Thomas' alleged harassment.

In 1991, she prepped Anita Hill before she testified. She was played by Grace Gummer in the HBO film Confirmation, depicting her role as adviser to Anita Hill during the Clarence Thomas Supreme Court nomination.

In September 2018, Politico reported that she is serving as an adviser to Christine Blasey Ford, who has accused Supreme Court nominee Brett Kavanaugh of sexually assaulting her in 1982 when they were teenagers. Her involvement was criticized by Cassie Smedile, press secretary for the Republican National Committee, who stated, "If you're concerned about an appearance of partisanship, hiring a Democratic operative with a history of smearing conservative judges doesn't exactly mitigate that."

=== Department of Justice ===
Subsequently, she was named as a deputy associate attorney general at the U.S. Department of Justice. In 2000, she served as a senior principal at TSD Communications, a position she maintains today. She served as then-Senator Joe Biden's communications director during the Obama presidential campaign in 2008. In 2009, she advised President Barack Obama during the successful nomination of Sonia Sotomayor to the Supreme Court. In 2021, Seidman rejoined the Department of Justice under the Biden administration.

=== Other activities ===
She also served as a fellow of the Harvard Institute of Politics at the John F. Kennedy School of Government, and for three years as executive director of Rock the Vote. Seidman served as an advisor to Google from 2006 to 2011 and her firm, TSD Communications, included Facebook among its clientele.
