= Al Casey (rock guitarist) =

American guitarist (1936–2006)

- Born: Alvin Wayne Casey; October 26, 1936; Long Beach, California, U.S.
- Died: September 17, 2006 (aged 69) Phoenix, Arizona, U.S.
- Genres: Rock, pop, rockabilly
- Occupation: Musician
- Instrument: Guitar
- Years active: 1950-c. early 2000s
- Formerly of: The Wrecking Crew

Alvin Wayne Casey (October 26, 1936 – September 17, 2006) was an American guitarist. He was mainly known for his work as a session musician, but also released his own records and scored three Billboard Hot 100 hits in the United States. His contribution to the rockabilly genre has been recognized by the Rockabilly Hall of Fame.

== Early life ==
Casey was born in Long Beach, California and moved to Phoenix, Arizona when he was two years old. His father played the guitar and tried to teach six-year-old Casey to play, but when he realized his son's fingers were too small, he gave him a ukulele instead. At the age of eight, Casey switched to the steel guitar and began taking formal music lessons. By the time he was 14, he was playing the steel guitar for various clubs in Phoenix, and in his later teens he performed five to six nights a week. When Casey was 20 he became serious about playing a traditional guitar.

== Career ==
=== "The Fool" ===
In his teens, Casey joined a local group, the Sunset Riders, and worked with vocalist Jody Reynolds. Around 1956, Casey crossed paths with Lee Hazlewood, a Coolidge, Arizona radio DJ who was looking for a singer to record his song, "The Fool". Casey suggested his schoolmate and friend Sanford Clark for the lead vocals. Casey played guitar for the recording and suggested a guitar riff which he had taken from Howlin' Wolf's song "Smokestack Lightnin". "The Fool" became a national hit and reached number No. 9 on the Billboard Top 10 pop charts. It also put the Phoenix music scene in the national spotlight. Due to the song's success, Casey went on a week long rockabilly tour with Carl Perkins, Gene Vincent, Eddie Cochran, Johnny Burnette, and Sonny James, traveling the country in Sanford Clark's Ford Mercury.

=== Duane Eddy and the Rebels ===
In 1955, Casey met Duane Eddy and joined his band, Duane Eddy and the Rebels. For five years, Casey worked on and off with Eddy's band and performed for the Alan Freed and Dick Clark shows. Casey was also part of the backup for other Eddy recordings, playing bass, piano, and rhythm guitar. Casey wrote one of Eddy's earliest hits, "Ramrod" (1958), and when Eddy performed the song on American Bandstand he was flooded with requests for the single. "Ramrod" peaked at No. 27 on the Billboard Hot 100 and No. 17 on the Billboard R&B charts in 1958. Casey also co-wrote another Eddy hit, "Forty Miles of Bad Road", which peaked at No. 9 on Billboard's Hot 100 on July 27, 1959. In 1958 he also played guitar on Jody Reynolds's hit song "Endless Sleep".

=== Al Casey Combo ===
In the early 1960s, Casey began working with his own ensemble, the Al Casey Combo. With this group he scored three instrumental hits: "Cookin" (U.S. No. 92, 1962), "Jivin' Around" (peaked at No. 71 on the Billboard Hot 100 and No. 22 on the Hot R&B/Hip Hop charts in 1962), and "Surfin' Hootenanny" (U.S. #48, 1963). The Surfin' Hootenanny album featured Casey mimicking the styles of Dick Dale, the Ventures, and Duane Eddy. Drummer Hal Blaine and organist Leon Russell played on many of these recordings; the backup vocal group, named the K-C-Ettes, were in fact the Blossoms. Casey recorded many of his albums with Stacy Records, which folded in 1964.

=== Studio session musician ===
In 1958, The Arizona Republic noted that Casey performed on 95% of recording sessions held in Phoenix that year. In 1964, he gave up touring and began to play a variety of music styles for studio sessions. In 1965, Casey moved to Los Angeles and became part of the group of session musicians which became known as the Wrecking Crew. He worked with this group for 18 years playing a variety of music styles including jazz, country, rock, and pop. As a member of the Wrecking Crew, he worked for artists such as the Beach Boys (including on their 1966 album Pet Sounds, the 1966 non-album single "Good Vibrations", and their 1970 album Sunflower), Phil Spector, Elvis Presley, Glen Campbell, the Association, the Monkees, Johnny Cash, Eddy Arnold, Simon & Garfunkel, the 5th Dimension, Harry Nilsson, the Partridge Family, Frank Sinatra, and Nancy Sinatra. During this time, Casey also worked for three years as a member of the band on The Dean Martin Show.

=== Guitar teacher and music store owner ===
In the late 1960s, Casey owned a music store in Hollywood called Al Casey's Music Room.

On August 3, 1967, George Harrison went with Neil Aspinall to Western recorders studio to gate crash a session with Lou Adler and John Philips. Mike Deasy, one of the session players, was playing a prototype Bartell Fretless Guitar that Harrison was very interested in. Aspinall immediately ordered one of the new 'Secret' guitars from Al Casey. It was Casey's wife Maxine who delivered the Bartell to Harrison on Blue Jay Way. A couple of weeks later Casey took out an advertisement in the Los Angeles Free Press saying, "George Harrison got the first guitar, maybe if you hurry you can get the second one!" The Bartell became one of the rarest Beatles guitars and was played by both John Lennon and George Harrison on The Beatles' White Album — it sold in 2020 for $300,000.

In 1968, Casey loaned his red Hagström Viking II guitar to Elvis Presley for his '68 Comeback Special. Casey also played guitar on the "stand-up" live shows and studio sessions for the special's corresponding album.

In 1983, Casey moved back to Phoenix, where he taught guitar lessons at Ziggie's Music and performed for occasional shows.

=== Later recordings and legacy ===
Casey continued recording into the 1990s, including an LP release, Sidewinder, for Bear Family Records. In 2001, he played guitar, dobro, mandolin, and banjo on Al Beasley's A Rainbow in the Clouds album, recorded live at the Kerr Cultural Center in Scottsdale, Arizona. He was a featured guitarist on the Exotic Guitars series of albums on the Ranwood Records label.

In 2005, Casey was inducted into the Arizona Music Hall of Fame. He was also inducted into the Rockabilly Hall of Fame.

Casey died on September 17, 2006, in Phoenix, Arizona.

In 2008, Casey, along with many of his fellow studio musicians, was featured in the documentary film The Wrecking Crew.

Independent Record label, Fervor Records, has placed many of his recordings in TV and film.

== Discography ==
Al Casey	Nola b/w Shine on Harvest Moon		Old Timer Records	S8151	1955
Al Casey	If I Told You (Wouldn't Know It All By Myself) b/w The Pink Panther		MCI	45-1004	1956
Al Casey	Guitar Man b/w Come What May		Dot Records	45-15563	1957
Al Casey	(Got The) Teen-Age Blues b/w The Adventures of Frank N. Stein (Record Label Shown as Al Casey and the Bats)		Highland	M-2033	1958
Al Casey	Surfin' Hootenanny	LP, Album, Mono	Barry	B-319 (C)	1963
Al Casey	Surfin' Hootenanny	LP	Stacy Records	STM 100-1	1963
Al Casey	Surfin' Hootenanny	LP, Mono	Stacy Records	STM 100-1	1963
Al Casey	Surfin' Hootenanny	LP, Album	Troubadour	TRL E 1232	1963
Al Casey	Surfin' Hootenanny	7"	Discostar	1066	1963
Al Casey	Surfin' Hootenanny	7"	CNR	A 9028	1963
Al Casey	Surfin' Hootenanny	7", Single	CBS	1237	1963
Al Casey	Surfin' Hootenanny	LP, Album, RE, Unofficial, Pac, Mono	Stacy Records	STS-100	Unknown
Al Casey	Surfin' Hootenanny	CD, Album	Sundazed Music	SC 6114	1996
Al Casey	Surfin' Hootenanny	LP, Album, RE, Red, Gre	Sundazed Music	LP 5026	1996
Al Casey	Surfin' Hootenanny	LP, Album, Gre, Mono	Sundazed Music	LP 5531	2016
Al Casey	Surfin' Hootenanny/Easy Pickin'/ Doin' It/ Monte Carlo	7", EP	Philips	434818 BE	1963
Al Casey	Sidewinder	CD, Album	Bear Family Records	BCD 15889 AH	1995
Al Casey	Juice/A Fool's Blues	7"	Dot Records	45 15524	1956
Al Casey	Willa Mae/She's Gotta Shake	7", Single	Liberty	F-55117	1957
Al Casey	Come What May	7"	Dot Records	45-15563	1957
Al Casey	The Stinger/Keep Talking	7", Single, Promo	United Artists Records	UA 158	1959
Al Casey	Guitars, Guitars, Guitars/The Hearse	7", Single	CBS	1304	Unknown
Al Casey	Jivin' Around	CD, Comp	Ace	CDCHD 612	1995
Al Casey	Surfin' Hootenanny	CD, Comp, RE	Stacy Records	STS 100	1995
Al Casey	A Man For All Sessions	CD, Comp	Bear Family Records	BCD16579 AH	2001
Artist	Album	Format	Record label	CAT#	Release date
Al Casey Combo	Jivin' Around/Doin' the Shotish	7', Single	Barry	B-3124X	1962
Al Casey Combo	Jivin' Around/Doin' the Shotish	7"	Stacy Records	936	1962
Al Casey Combo	Cookin'/Hotfoot	7", Single	Stacy Records	925 X	1962
Al Casey Combo	Cookin'	7", Single	Barry	B-3109X	1962
Al Casey Combo	Laughin'/ Chicken Feathers	7", Single, Promo	Stacy Records	950	1962
Al Casey Combo	Doin' It/ Monte Carlo	7", Single, Promo	Stacy Records	956	1963
Al Casey Combo	Indian Love Call/Full House	7", Single	Stacy Records	961	1963
Al Casey with the K-C Ettes	Guitars, Guitars, Guitars/Surfin' Blues (Part 1)	7", Single, Promo	Stacy Records	964	1963
Al Casey with the K-C Ettes	Guitars, Guitars, Guitars/Surfin' Blues (Part 1)	7", Single	Barry	B-3218X	1963
Al Casey with the K-C Ettes	Surfin' Hootenanny/Easy Pickin'	7"	Discostar	1066	1963
Al Casey with the K-C Ettes	Surfin' Hootenanny/Easy Pickin'	7"	CNR	A 9028	1963
Al Casey with the K-C Ettes	Surfin' Hootenanny/Easy Pickin'	7", Single	CBS	1237	1963
Al Casey with the K-C Ettes	Surfin' Hootenanny/Easy Pickin'	7", Single, Red, Promo	Stacy Records	962	1963
Al Casey with the K-C Ettes	Surfin' Hootenanny/Easy Pickin'	7", Single	Barry	B-3196X	1963
Al Casey with the K-C Ettes	Surfin' Hootenanny/Easy Pickin'	7", Single	W&G	WG-S-1645	1963
Al Casey with the K-C Ettes	Surfin' Hootenanny/Easy Pickin'	7", Single	Pye International	7N.25215	1963
Al Casey With the K-C Elites/Al Casey Combo	What Are We Gonna Do in '64?/Cookin'	7", Single	Stacy Records	971	1964
Chet Baker (with Al Casey)	Blood, Chet, and Tears		Verve Records		1970
Duane Eddy and His Rockabillies Featuring Al Casey	The Ford Single	7"	Sleazy Records	SR52	2013
Don Cole, Al Casey	Snake-Eyed Mama/Kiss of Love	7", Single	RPM Records	45x502	Unknown
Lee Hazlewood & Al Casey Combo	Farmisht, Flatulence, Origami, ARF!! And Me	CD, Album	Smells Like Records	SLR 031	1999
Various	Almost Big Hits of 1962, Vol. 8 (Original Recordings)		Six Week Smile		2013
Various	Mid-Century Sounds: Deep Cuts From the Desert (Vol. 1)	CD, Vinyl, LP, Whi + LP, Comp, Bla	Fervor Records	FVRLP001	2017
Various	Amazing Hits of the Transistor Era Vol. 1	12xFile, MP3, Album. 256 kbps	Fervor Records		2007
Various	Amazing Hits of the Transistor Era Vol. 2	13xFile, MP3, Compilation, 256 kbps	Fervor Records		2007

== Collaborations ==
With Glen Campbell

- Burning Bridges (Capitol Records, 1967)
- Wichita Lineman (Capitol Records, 1968)
- Hey Little One (Capitol Records, 1968)
- A New Place in the Sun (Capitol Records, 1968)
- Galveston (Capitol Records, 1969)
- Try a Little Kindness (Capitol Records, 1970)
- The Glen Campbell Goodtime Album (Capitol Records, 1971)
- I Knew Jesus (Before He Was a Star) (Capitol Records, 1973)

With Jennifer Warnes

- I Can Remember Everything (Parrot Records, 1967)

With Nancy Sinatra

- Sugar (Reprise Records, 1966)
- Nancy (Reprise Records, 1969)

With Michael Nesmith

- Nevada Fighter (RCA Records, 1971)

With Delaney & Bonnie

- Genesis (GNP, 1971)

With Bobby Darin

- If I Were a Carpenter (Atlantic Records, 1966)

With The Beach Boys

- Pet Sounds (1966)
- "Good Vibrations" (1966 non-album single; later included on the 1967 album Smiley Smile)
- Sunflower (1970)

== Tv and Film ==
Artist	Song title	Show Title	Media	Network	Episode	Air Date
Al Casey	"If I Told You"	NCIS Los Angeles	TV	CBS	200	11/19/2017
Al Casey Combo	"Cookin'"	30 for 30	TV	ESPN		9/1/2014
Al Casey Combo	"Cookin'"	12 Monkeys	TV	SyFy	210	6/20/2016
Al Casey Combo	"Cookin'"	Stranger Things	SVOD	Netflix	203	10/27/2017
Al Casey Combo	"Laughin'"	The Astronaut Wives Club	TV	ABC	101	6/18/2015
Al Casey Combo	"Doin' It"	The Playboy Club	TV	NBC	104	10/2011
