= Ted Newman (singer) =

American singer

Ted Newman (born May 6, 1939) is an American singer, guitarist, songwriter, teacher, and cowboy poet. In 1957, his single “Plaything” was released on Rev Records and reached No. 45 on the Billboard Top 100. The same year he made two appearances on Dick Clark's American Bandstand. In January, 2009 The Associated Press selected Newman's poem "Plea to the Pres" as a winner in their poetry contest regarding the inauguration of President Barack Obama. In 2012, the Arizona Historical Society named him as one of 100 Arizona Culture Keepers for the Arizona Centennial celebration.

== Early life ==
Newman was born in South Dakota, spent much of his childhood in Wyoming, and then moved to Arizona. He attended Holbrook High School for three years and then moved to Phoenix, Arizona, where he attended North Phoenix High School. He played quarterback at Holbrook, and was a celebrated fullback for North Phoenix High. He also performed and sang baritone solos for his high school's A Cappella Choir. In 1957, The Arizona Republic reported that he was voted Most Outstanding Senior (male) at his high school.

== Recording success ==
While still in high school, Newman got his start in the music business recording a few jingles for local commercials. During his senior year he recorded the single "Plaything" (written by Henry and Samuel Underwood) b/w "Unlucky Me" (written by Connie Conway) with Rev Records at Ramsey's Recording Studio (later Audio Recorders). The single sold 20,000 copies in the first ten days. After two and a half weeks it sold 100,000 copies, and eventually over 250,000 copies were purchased. In 1957, "Plaything" peaked at No. 45 on the Billboard Top 100. Building on his chart success, Newman performed on Dick Clark's American Bandstand, the Guy Mitchell Show, and The Milt Grant Show. He also opened for Johnny Cash and Carl Perkins on a six-week tour of Texas. His follow up album with Rev Records, "I Double Dare You" was considered a "flop". He later recorded "Why Did You Break My Heart?" b/w "It's Hot in Here" and "Brigette" b/w 'Hey Little Freshman" with RCA Victor.

== College ==
Newman attended Arizona State University (ASU) on a football scholarship, but the NCAA prohibited student athletes on scholarships from collecting income from outside sources. Due to the success of "Plaything", he was already making money with his music. For this reason, and a knee injury, Newman chose to stop playing football and pursue his music career.

While at ASU, Newman was part of a folk-song trio, the Balladeers, with fellow singers John Southern and Toby Constance.

In 1960, Newman and two fellow ASU students decided to tour the world with their stringed instruments. Newman sold one of his guitars and an amplifier to help fund their six-month trip. Newman played guitar, John Southern played the banjo, and Ron Iverson provided vocals. They started out with $160 cash and paid for their rest of their travel expenses by performing and finding money-making opportunities along the way. While in Spain, he recorded an album which made 17,400 pesetas, which was equal to about US$300. He also spent a week working as a coal miner in Cologne, Germany.

During Christmas break, Newman worked at the Arizona Biltmore Hotel as a host taking care of children and teens whose parents were vacationing there. He took them on desert picnics, swimming parties, and other events.

== Career ==
=== Performing music ===
For several years, Ted Newman performed regularly at the Ramada Inn and The Other Place restaurant, both in Scottsdale, Arizona.

In 1993 he recorded a new album of his original songs entitled Where Does Love Go? The album was arranged and produced by guitarist Billy Williams (who also worked with Lyle Lovett, Wanda Jackson, Mel Tillis) and recorded by Grammy Award winning recording engineer, Jack Miller, at Jack Miller Productions in Phoenix.

In 1996, he got together with Al Casey and Del Shannon to perform as the Ted Newman Trio. For a while, they performed every Thursday night at Monti's at the Ranch, in Mesa, Arizona.

=== Military ===
Newman flew a helicopter for ten years in the Air National Guard, and was a Captain in the U.S Army Reserve at Fort Huachuca in Sierra Vista, Arizona. He has toured veterans hospitals on many occasions to sing and perform for the hospitalized veterans.

=== Teacher ===
While working on his teaching credential from Western New Mexico University, he worked a variety of odd jobs including teaching ballroom dancing, running a chili plant, and managing a K-Mart. He worked for six years at a grade school in Deming, New Mexico, and then worked for many more years at Nevitt Elementary School, and later at Aguilar Elementary School in the Tempe Elementary School District. He used his music in the classroom as a teaching tool and wrote songs about the vulnerable childhood years, including warning against drug use and self-pity. He also wrote songs about academic subjects.

=== Poet and songwriter ===
Newman has written over 500 songs and poems. One of Newman's songs "The Great Sonoran Desert" has been illustrated and made into a children's book. He also created and performed "The Great Sonoran Desert Critter Show" in which he gave children an educational presentation about desert animals.

In January 2009, The Associated Press selected Newman's poem "Plea to the Pres" and nine other poems as winners in their poetry contest which asked for entries about the inauguration of President Barack Obama. Newman used the opportunity to ask President Obama to "be the President our country needs." One of his poems, a tribute to actor Ben Johnson, titled "Ben Johnson Evening Star", which he co-wrote with historian Marshall Trimble, was printed in American Cowboy Magazine and True West Magazine.

Newman wrote 18 original songs for a musical play, The Lost Dutchman, about the Superstition Mountains legend of the Lost Dutchman gold mine. The Arizona Musical Theatre Institute presented the musical in January 2001.

His song "Those Who Served So Well" written for fallen police officers, has been shared with police departments across the country.

=== Ranch hand ===
He has spent many summers working in Colorado as a wrangler, guide, and entertainer for special events.

== Awards and legacy ==
In 2012, the Arizona Historical Society named him as one of 100 Arizona Culture Keepers for the Arizona Centennial.

== Discography ==
Artist	Album title	Format	Cat #	Record label	Release date
Doug Harden/Ted Newman	The Storm/Plaything	7", Single	5061	Moonglow Records	1957
Ted Newman	Plaything	7", Single	45-3505	Rev Records	1957
Ted Newman	I Double Dare You/None of Your Tears	7"	45-3511	Rev Records	1957
Ted Newman	Brigitte/Hey Little Freshman	7", Single	47-7251	RCA Victor	1958
Ted Newman	It's Hot in Here/Why Do You Break My Heart	7", Single	47-7197	RCA Victor	1958
Ted Newman	Where Does Love Go?	CD		Jack Miller Productions	2004

== TV song placements ==
Two of Newman's Rev Records recordings, "Plaything" and "None of Your Tears" have been licensed by Fervor Records to television shows. His song "None of Your Tears" was played on episode 110 of the show Killing Kennedy, on the National Geographic channel. His song, "Plaything" was played on episode 205 of the show Wynonna Earp on the SyFy channel.
