= Marmoset (music agency) =

- Industry: Music; advertising; film; broadcast
- Founded: 2010
- Founders: Ryan Wines; Brian Hall
- Headquarters: Portland, Oregon, US
- Area served: Worldwide
- Services: Music licensing; original music production; music clearances; sound design; music composition; music education; sync licensing
- Number of employees: 27
- Website: www.marmosetmusic.com

Marmoset is a music agency with headquarters in Portland, Oregon. Founded in 2010, by Ryan Wines and Brian Hall, Marmoset represents vintage, emerging, and independent artists, bands, and record labels for licensing. In 2019, Marmoset became the first Certified B Corporation music agency on the planet providing tangible metrics, social sustainability and environmental standards, and committing to public transparency in the global B Corp community.

== Capabilities ==
Marmoset's Music Production Team specializes in creating soundtracks and scores for brand campaigns, film, and television. The agency has also developed a music search and licensing platform at marmosetmusic.com. The search tool offers advanced music filtering technology, allowing users to find and license music easily with custom search elements.
