= Carlos Bonilla =

Carlos E. Bonilla (July 26, 1954 – February 28, 2018) was an American lobbyist, an advisor on economic policy to U.S. president George W. Bush, and senior vice president at The Washington Group, a lobbying firm.

== Early life and education ==
Carlos Bonilla was born July 26, 1954, in Washington, D.C. He obtained an undergraduate degree from American University and a Masters in Economics from Georgetown University, both in Washington, D.C.

== Career ==
=== George W. Bush administration ===
In January 2001, Bonilla joined the George W. Bush administration, where he served as Special Assistant for Economic Policy until early 2003. He worked on the first two tax bills, aviation issues, and pension issues including post-Enron reforms to 401(k) plans and issues related to defined benefit plans. In the aftermath of the September 11 attacks, he was responsible for ensuring that trade flows across the borders and through the ports were maintained in light of enhanced security concerns, and participated in a working group on West Coast ports during a 2003 labor dispute, leading to a Taft-Hartley Act injunction.

=== Lobbyist ===
In March 2003, Bonilla rejoined the private sector as a lobbyist for The Washington Group, where he represented BioMarin Pharmaceutical and Ranbaxy Pharmaceuticals.

=== McCain presidential campaign ===
In 2007, he joined the John McCain presidential campaign as an economic advisor, and resigned in May 2008 after exposure of his ties to convicted lobbyist Jack Abramoff. The House Oversight Committee reported that Bonilla had accepted two tickets to a football game but did not report any improper actions by Bonilla on behalf of Abramoff.

=== Other affiliations ===
Bonilla's other professional affiliations include:

- Senior fellow at The Heritage Foundation
- Chief economist for the National Chamber Foundation at the United States Chamber of Commerce and at the Institute for Research on the Economics of Taxation (IRET).
- Chief economist for the Employment Policies Institute focusing on health care and employment issues.
- Economist for the House Committee on the Budget under then-chairman John Kasich.
- Advisor to the Bush-Cheney campaign on the Economic Growth and Tax Relief Reconciliation Act.

== Death ==
He died on February 28, 2018, at the age of 63.
