= Bill Burton (political consultant) =

American political consultant

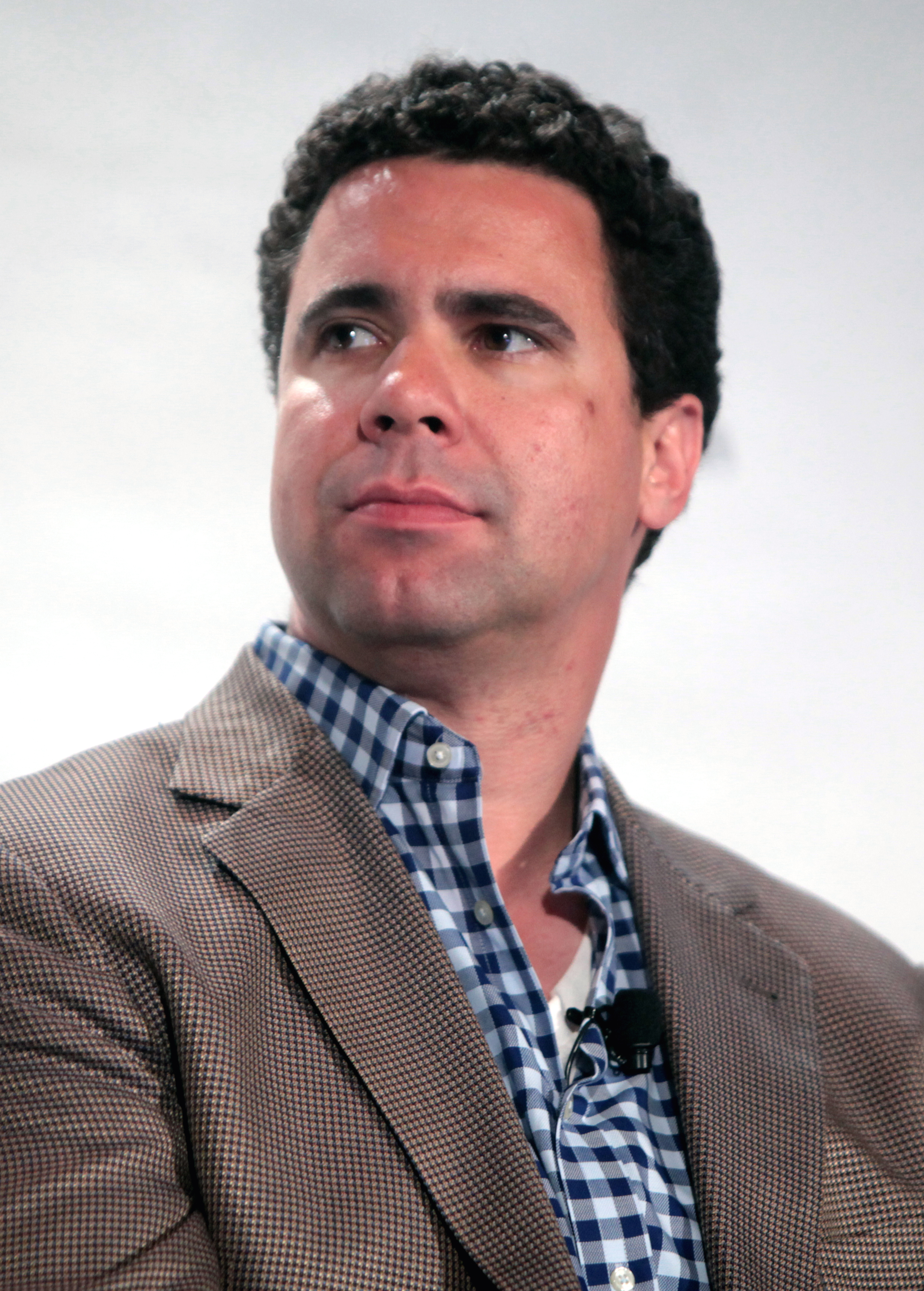

White House Deputy Press Secretary
- In office December 19, 2009 – February 11, 2011
- President: Barack Obama
- Secretary: Robert Gibbs
- Preceded by: Jen Psaki
- Succeeded by: Josh Earnest

Personal details
- Born: August 9, 1977 (age 48) Buffalo, New York, U.S.
- Political party: Democratic
- Spouse: Kelly Ward (m. 2019)
- Education: University of Minnesota (BA)

Bill Burton (born August 9, 1977) is an American political consultant and communication strategist who served as Deputy White House Press Secretary in the Obama administration from 2009 to 2011.

Burton is the founder and president of Bryson Gillette, a political and strategic communications firm based in Los Angeles.

== Early life and education ==
Burton was born in Buffalo, New York, on August 9, 1977. He is the son of Troy Burton, who is African American, and a white mother. Burton graduated from the University of Minnesota, earning a bachelor's degree in English literature with a focus on African American literature.

== Career ==
Burton worked as a press secretary for Bill Luther. He was press secretary for Tom Harkin from 2001 to 2003, and communications director for the Democratic Congressional Campaign Committee (DCCC) in the 2006 election cycle. He has worked on the campaigns of Richard Gephardt, John Kerry, and Barack Obama. Burton signed on with candidate Sen. John F. Kerry (D-Mass.) after Gephardt dropped out of the presidential race of 2004. Kerry lost the White House to incumbent George W. Bush after winning the Democratic nomination. In 2007, Burton joined the presidential campaign of Barack Obama, where he worked as national press secretary.

During the Obama administration, Burton served as Deputy White House Press Secretary under Robert Gibbs from December 2009 until February 2011. He was also a Special Assistant to the President during the same time. In the role, Burton served as an adviser to the president and was tasked with briefing reporters. Burton also frequently traveled with the president on domestic and international visits. Burton was the first White House employee to have an official Twitter account.

Burton left the White House in February 2011. He was a co-founder and senior strategist with the Priorities USA Action super PAC, Referring to Priorities USA Action's "Stage" ad criticizing Mitt Romney before the 2012 presidential election, Frank Luntz said “that ad alone has killed Mitt Romney in Ohio.” In January 2013, Burton helped open the Washington, D.C. office of Global Strategy Group, a Public Relations firm based in New York City.

SKDKnickerbocker later hired Burton to open their California office in Los Angeles. In 2020, he launched Bryson Gillette, a minority-owned political and strategic communications firm in Los Angeles.

=== Howard Schultz's possible 2020 run ===
On January 28, 2019, it was reported that Burton, along with Steve Schmidt, had been hired to help consider a potential presidential run by former Starbucks CEO Howard Schultz. In September 2019, Schultz officially announced that he would not run in 2020, citing health concerns.

== Personal life ==
In 2007, he married Laura Capps, daughter of former California congresswoman Lois Capps. They have one son, Oscar, and lived in Santa Barbara, California, before divorcing.

Burton married Kelly Ward Burton, president of the National Democratic Redistricting Committee, on April 6, 2019.
