= Edward Newman (political scientist) =

British political scientist

Edward Newman is a British political scientist who is Professor of International Security at the School of Politics and International Studies at the University of Leeds. He is also an International Associate at the Center for Peace and Human Security, Institut d'Études Politiques de Paris. Newman was previously Senior Lecturer in International Relations and former Deputy Head of the Department of Political Science and International Studies at the University of Birmingham and, before that, Director of Studies on Conflict and Security in the Peace and Governance Programme of the United Nations University in Tokyo. He is the editor-in-chief of the journal Civil Wars.

Newman specialises in the study of human security, international organisations and multilateralism, and peacebuilding. He has written three monographs, The UN Secretary-General from the Cold War to the New Era (Macmillan, 1998), A Crisis of Global Institutions? Multilateralism and International Security (Routledge, 2007) and Understanding Civil Wars. Continuity and Change in Intrastate Conflict (Routledge, 2014), and edited numerous books including Refugees and Forced Displacement: International Security, Human Vulnerability, and the State (co-edited, UNU Press, 2003), Challenges to Peacebuilding: Managing Spoilers During Conflict Resolution (co-edited, UNU Press, 2006) and New Perspectives on Liberal Peacebuilding (co-edited, UNU Press, 2009). In addition, he has published articles in journals including Global Dialogue, Global Society, International Peacekeeping, the International Journal of Human Rights, International Studies Perspectives, Security Dialogue, Studies in Conflict and Terrorism, Review of International Studies and Global Responsibility to Protect.'
