= Gerry Parsky =

American financier and public servant

- Born: Gerald L. Parsky; October 18, 1942 (age 84); Hartford, Connecticut, U.S.
- Education: Princeton University; University of Virginia
- Political party: Republican

Gerald L. Parsky (born 1942) is an American financier and former public servant. He is chairman of Aurora Capital Group, a Los Angeles–based private investment firm managing over $2.0 billion of private equity capital.

== Personal ==
Parsky was born in Hartford, Connecticut, in 1942 to Jewish parents who were unable to attend college because of the depression. For this reason, Mr. Parsky's parents dedicated themselves to providing the finest education possible to Parsky, who graduated from Princeton University and the University of Virginia Law School, and has devoted voluntary time to education.

Parsky resides in Rancho Santa Fe, California. He has two children, Laura Parsky of San Diego, California, and David Parsky of Los Angeles, California and two grandchildren, Annabelle and Izzy Parsky.

== Professional career ==
After working for three years for a Wall Street law firm, he was recruited to the United States Department of the Treasury in 1971. He served in various positions from 1971 to 1974 in the U.S. Treasury Department and the Federal Energy Office.

From 1974 until 1977 he served as assistant secretary of the U.S. Treasury, responsible for capital markets policy; all of the Treasury Department's international affairs, including trade policy; international monetary policy; investment and energy policy; relations with industrial and developing countries; and U.S. policy relating to the international financial institutions, such as the World Bank and the International Monetary Fund.

From 1977 until 1992, Parsky was affiliated with the law firm of Gibson, Dunn & Crutcher, where he was a senior partner and a member of the executive and management committees. In 1992, Parsky founded Aurora Capital Group.

== Public service ==
Parsky has volunteered for numerous community, educational and public service activities. He received appointments from five U.S. presidents. In addition to serving Presidents Nixon and Ford, Parsky received appointments to the President's Council on Productivity (Reagan); the President's Export Council (George H.W. Bush) and the President's Commission to Strengthen Social Security (George W. Bush). Parsky serves as a trustee to both the Ronald Reagan Presidential Foundation in California and the George (H.W.) Bush Presidential Library Foundation in Texas.

He served as chairman of the 1996 Republican National Convention Host Committee in San Diego. He also served as the California chairman of President George W. Bush's campaigns in 2000 and 2004.

His other public service activities in California include appointments by California's governor to be: chairman of The commission on the 21st Century Economy (2009); and chairman of The Public Employee Post-Employment Benefits Commission (2007).

== Educational activities ==
Appointed in 1996 to a twelve-year term as regent of the University of California, Parsky was elected unanimously by his peers to serve as their chairman. Parsky oversaw the regents' governance of the university, including oversight and negotiations on behalf of the U.S. nuclear labs at Los Alamos and Lawrence Livermore, student admissions, expansion of the U.C. Merced campus, as well as budget and fiscal issues, including pension plans for the faculty and staff. Parsky retired as a Regent in 2008, and received a resolution from the Regents.

Parsky also served as a charter trustee of Princeton University from 1981 to 1991; serves as a trustee of the Salk Institute; and the advisory council of Woodrow Wilson School at Princeton University.

== Philanthropy ==
Parsky and his family have established the Parsky Family Scholarship at Princeton University; the Parsky Family Scholarship at UCLA's Anderson School of Business and Management and the Parsky Family Scholarship at Sidwell Friends School in Washington, D.C.

== Awards ==
Parsky has been awarded the Woodrow Wilson Institute Corporate Citizen Award; the Alexander Hamilton Award (the highest award presented in the U.S. Treasury Department); and was voted One of Ten Outstanding Young Men in America by U.S. Jaycees.

Parsky holds a Juris Doctor degree from the University of Virginia School of Law and a Bachelor of Arts in English from Princeton University.
