= Wayne Berman =

American lobbyist (born 1956)

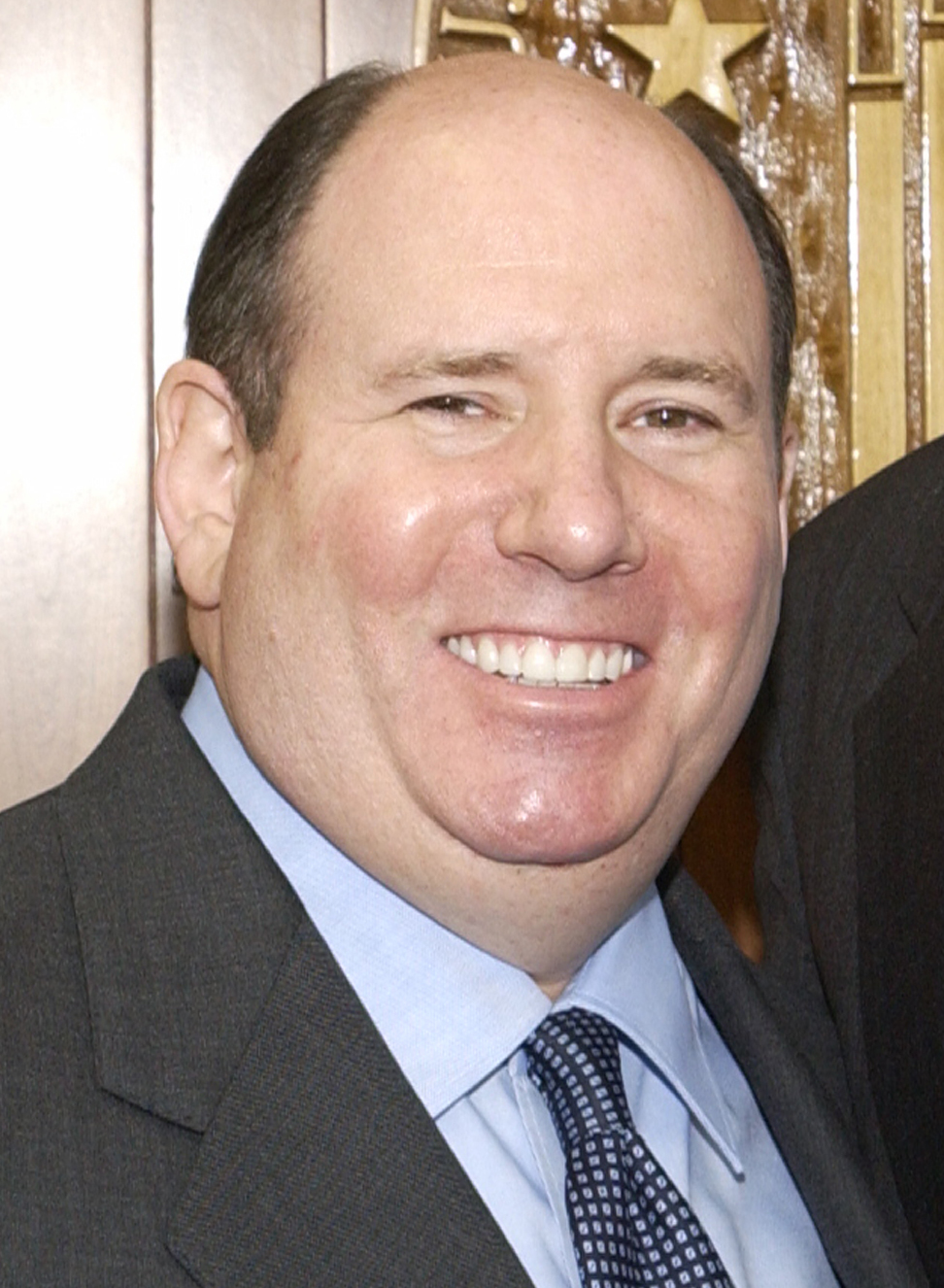
- Berman in 2003
- Born: November 8, 1956 (age 69); Rochester, New York, U.S.
- Education: State University of New York, Buffalo (BA); Georgetown University
- Political party: Republican

Wayne Lee Berman is an American businessman and former lobbyist. He is the senior managing director for government relations at the Blackstone Group. He was formerly the chairman of Ogilvy Government Relations, a division of Ogilvy & Mather. Berman is considered a key figure in Republican political advocacy, serving as a senior advisor on the 2000 and 2004 Bush-Cheney campaigns, Finance Chairman of the 2008 John McCain presidential campaign, and Chairman of Marco Rubio's 2016 presidential campaign.

Berman, a native of Rochester, New York, is married to Lea Berman, who served as the Social Secretary and Special Assistant to the President under George W. Bush. Prior to that she was chief of staff for Dick Cheney's wife, Lynne Cheney.

Berman was a close friend of McCain. In October 2008, Berman made an anonymous comment to the press calling Sarah Palin, McCain's vice presidential nominee, a "diva". The quote received considerable media attention and infuriated Palin and others within the campaign.
