= Opposition research =

Political negative campaigning practice

In politics, opposition research (also called oppo research) is the practice of collecting information on a political opponent or other adversary that can be used to discredit or otherwise weaken them. The information can include biographical, legal, criminal, medical, educational, or financial history or activities, as well as prior media coverage, or the voting record of a politician. Opposition research can also entail using trackers to follow an individual and record their activities or political speeches.

The research is usually conducted in the time period between announcement of intent to run and the actual election; however political parties maintain long-term databases that can cover several decades. The practice is both a tactical maneuver and a cost-saving measure. The term is frequently used to refer not just to the collection of information but also how it is utilized, as a component of negative campaigning.

== Origins and history ==
In the 1st century BC, Cicero is said to have gathered information that was damaging to opponents and used it in attacks against them. He accused one political opponent, Catiline, of murdering one wife to make room for another. He attacked Mark Antony in speeches known as the Philippicae, eventually prompting Antony to chop off his head and right hand and display them at the Roman Forum.

Opposition research also has its origins in military planning, as evident in such ancient texts as The Art of War, published in the 5th century BC by Sun Tzu. This manual for warriors describes the necessity for understanding an opponent's weaknesses, for using spies, and for striking in moments of weakness.

In 18th-century England and Ireland, opposition research took the form of scandal-mongering pamphlet wars between the Whig and Tory parties. Writers such as Daniel Defoe, Jonathan Swift, and Henry Fielding participated, often writing under assumed names. This tradition of robust attack was replicated later in the American colonies, when writers such as Thomas Paine and Benjamin Franklin conducted opposition research and published their results.

The first appearance of the phrase "opposition research" in The New York Times occurred on December 17, 1971, in an article that describes the infiltration of the Edmund Muskie presidential campaign by a female Republican volunteer: "...an article appeared in a Washington newspaper describing the 'opposition research' program at Republican headquarters..."

Opposition research became systematized in the 1970s, when Ken Khachigian, a speechwriter in the Nixon Administration, suggested that the GOP keep files on individuals as insurance against future races, rather than "scramble" in an ad hoc fashion, race by race.

== Methods ==
Opposition research differs immensely depending on the size and funding of a campaign, the ethics of the candidate, and the era in which it is conducted. Information gathering can be classified into three main categories: open-source research enabled by the Freedom of Information Act, covert operations or "tradecraft, " and maintenance of human systems of informants. Increasingly, data-mining of electronic records is used. Information is then stored for future use, and disseminated in a variety of ways. A local election sometimes has a staff member dedicated to reading through all of the opponents' public statements and their voting records; others initiate whisper campaigns that employ techniques of disinformation or "black ops" to deliberately mislead the public by advancing a pre-determined "narrative" that will present the opponent in a negative light.

Another technique is to infiltrate the opposition's operations and position a paid informant there. "Gray propaganda" techniques are often used to release damaging information to news media outlets without its source being identified properly, a technique inherited from disinformation tactics employed by intelligence agencies such as the Office of Strategic Services during World War II.

File-sharing between operatives of political parties is quite common. In the 2008 presidential election, a dossier of opposition research against Republican vice-presidential nominee Sarah Palin was posted in its entirety on a political blog site, Politico.com. The file was compiled by the staff of her opponent in the 2006 Alaska gubernatorial race, Tony Knowles.

"Oppo dumps" are used by political campaigns to systematically supply files of damaging information to press outlets, including matters of the public record, video footage from party archives and private collections, as well as private intelligence gathered by operatives. Many prime time television and radio news commentaries rely on this supply of party-generated material because it is free, and therefore more cost-effective than paying investigative reporters.

Candidates and incumbents who benefit from opposition research often choose to remain uninformed about their campaign's operations and tactics, to ensure plausible deniability should criminal charges be brought against researchers.

=== Trackers and videography ===
Another technique is to position information or personnel within media outlets. Often the information is video footage gathered in campaign-funded "tracker programs" wherein videographers use candidates' itineraries to track them and record as many remarks as possible, since anything they say can and will be used against them, as was the case in former Senator George Allen's "macaca moment." In the 2006 election cycle, a Virginia senator, George Allen, was unseated because of videotape of the senator calling a videographer/opposition researcher a "macaca" or monkey. The name was considered to be an ethnic slur, and Allen's campaign could not overcome the damage when the incident was broadcast widely in mainstream media and on the internet.

In the 2021 New Jersey gubernatorial election, a tracker working for Governor Phil Murphy’s campaign regularly attended Republican nominee Jack Ciattarelli’s public events to record his statements for potential opposition research use. The Ciattarelli campaign, aware of the tracker’s role, chose to publicly acknowledge him during town halls—an indication of how routine and embedded trackers have become in modern campaign strategy.

=== Digital media and Wikipedia ===
A 2005 analysis of digital media strategies published by the American Academy of Political Science took the view that new technologies enable "political elites" to use database and Internet technologies to do opposition research more easily, but they use data-mining techniques that outrage privacy advocates and surreptitious technologies that few Internet users understand. Data becomes "richer" about political actors, policy options, and the diversity of actors and opinion in the public sphere, but citizenship is "thinner" by virtue of "the ease in which people can become politically expressive without being substantively engaged."

Facebook photos became a tool of opposition researchers in California's 32nd congressional district special election, 2009 to replace Hilda Solis. Front-runner Democrat Gil Cedillo sent out mailers targeting 26-year-old Emanuel Pleitez, grouping Pleitez's Facebook photos to suggest that he parties to excess with alcohol, and fraternizes with gangs. The text of the mailer suggested Pleitez, posing with a Latino stage actress and using a Latino voter registration drive hand sign, was "flashing gang signs".

In 2006, the campaign manager of Georgia Democratic gubernatorial candidate Cathy Cox, Morton Brilliant, resigned after Cox's opponent, Lt. Gov, Mark Taylor, revealed Cox's campaign had added information from an opposition research dossier to a Wikipedia page on Taylor. Wikipedia co-founder Jimmy Wales confirmed that the material had come from an IP address affiliated with the Cox campaign. Citing an Associated Press analysis, CNN reported that Wikipedia being used as a "popular tool" for opposition researchers became so widespread a problem that Wikipedia altered its submission guidelines and set up alerts so that its operators know when Capitol Hill staffers alter Wikipedia content. However, anyone who wanted to could simply bypass this by using an IP address not associated with Capitol Hill.

=== Grassroot campaigns ===
Opposition research is a necessary component of grassroots activist groups. Research on corporate or political opponents may enable activist groups to target neighborhoods from which to increase their numbers, to refine their focus or "target", to pinpoint the target's vulnerabilities, to reveal hidden sources of funding or little-known connections, to investigate scare tactics, and to augment a legislative initiative.

In the presidential election of 2008, the blog Talking Points Memo pioneered "collaborative citizen-reporting projects" based on groups of volunteers examining public documents that shed light on the George W. Bush administration's U.S. attorneys firings controversy. Other organizations such as the Sunlight Foundation encouraged citizen examination of such public domain records as Mitt Romney's financial disclosure statements and Bill Clinton's income statements.

=== Preventive measures ===
Political strategies for campaigns often include coaching on preventive measures to avoid providing too much information in public disclosure procedures that can provide ammunition for opponents' opposition researchers, particularly in itemized expenditure reports. "To eliminate some of these potential issues your campaign should take the time to review the wording of your campaign finance reports", advises one strategist writing for The Hill:

Instead of reporting that you spent $3,000 on a 'background check and public records search on Congressman X,' list the expenditure as 'issue research' or simply 'research'... One bonus financial filing tip: warn your candidate about spending campaign funds on fancy restaurants for 'strategy meetings.' Eating at Ruth's Chris or Morton's Steak House on your campaign's dime just looks bad. The press may poke a little fun at your candidate's expense; your donors may feel their donation in being misspent and may never give again.

=== Funding and institutions ===
Congressional and presidential opposition research is often conducted by or funded by a political party, lobbying group, political action committee (PAC), or a 527 group that coalesces around a certain issue. In the U.S., both the Republican and Democratic parties employ full-time "Directors of Research" and maintain databases on opponents. In recent years the task of opposition research has been privatized in many areas. Full-time companies with permanent staff specializing in media productions or "grassroots" operations have replaced volunteers and campaign officials. Political media consultants may also opt for astroturfing techniques, which simulate wide popular appeal for a candidate's platform.

== Australia ==
In October 2011, a media storm erupted in Australia over the leaking of 'dirt files' compiled by the Liberal National Party and further revelations that a former Australian Labor Party operative had been engaged to help compile the dossiers.

Despite protestations that key party personnel had no knowledge of the dossiers it was later revealed a Liberal National Party opposition research strategist had been compiling the files as part of a SWOT analysis at previous elections which formed the basis of negative attack messaging for a 'rapid response unit'.

== South Africa ==
In January 2017, the African National Congress (ANC) was exposed when Sihle Bolani filed an affidavit in the Johannesburg High Court, demanding payment for her part in project War Room. The War Room's mandate was to "disempower DA and EFF campaigns" and set a pro-ANC agenda using a range of media, without revealing the ANC's hand.

== United States ==
=== Presidential elections ===
Opponents of Andrew Jackson in the 1824 and 1828 presidential elections unearthed his marriage records to imply that he was an adulterer for marrying Rachel Robards before she was legally divorced from her first husband. Jackson had married her in 1791 on the strength of a statement from her husband that he had divorced her; Jackson had two wedding ceremonies, the not-recognizable one of 1791 and the legally corrective one of 1794. His political opponents used this information decades later against him, and he fought many duels over his wife's honor. Rachel Robards died before Jackson took office in his first term; he maintained that the stress of the opposition had killed her.

In 1858, William Herndon, the law partner of Abraham Lincoln, did research in the Illinois State Library to collect "all the ammunition Mr. Lincoln saw fit to gather" to prepare for the run against Stephen A. Douglas in the 1860 presidential race.

In preparation for Ronald Reagan's debate with President Jimmy Carter in the presidential race 1980, Reagan's campaign staff acquired under mysterious circumstances a 200-page briefing book, including information on Carter's strategy, which staffers David Stockman and David Gergen had used to prepare Reagan. The Federal Bureau of Investigation and the Justice Department investigated to see how the information had been obtained by the Reagan camp. Two law professors filed suit in federal district court in Washington to request a special investigation, based on the 1978 Ethics in Government Act. Carter's staff believed the book to have been stolen from the White House, but the inquiry did not uncover any credible evidence that any law had been violated. The House of Representatives conducted its own investigation, and concluded in a 2,314-page report that the Reagan staff had two copies of the book, one from Reagan's campaign director William J. Casey, future head of the Central Intelligence Agency. James Baker attributed the acquisition of the documents to Casey, who claimed to know nothing about them, and an analysis of Carter campaign documents found in the "Afghanistan" files of Reagan aide David Gergen indicated they came from three White House offices: the National Security Council, Vice President Walter Mondale and Domestic Adviser Stuart Eizenstat. Many years afterward, Carter himself stated in a PBS interview that the book had been taken by columnist George Will, but Will denied it, calling Carter "a recidivist liar."

Lee Atwater is considered to be the "father" of modern aggressive "oppo" techniques. Atwater honed his style working in his native South Carolina for Senator Strom Thurmond and to elect Congressman (later Governor) Carroll Campbell. From his posts on the 1984 and 1988 presidential campaigns of Ronald Reagan and George H. W. Bush, Atwater encouraged and helped direct what was then the advanced oppo work of the Republican National Committee against Democrats Walter Mondale and Michael Dukakis. During the 1988 presidential campaign, dozens of RNC researchers worked three shifts around the clock to feed the then-burgeoning 24-hour news cycle. The now-infamous "Willie Horton" TV ads crafted by Floyd Brown helped turn voters away from Dukakis and towards the Republican, although Atwater and Bush were protected by plausible deniability because Brown's ads were independently funded and produced. Academic research into the Bush archives decades later revealed that a Bush staffer, Candice Strother, had released a dossier of information on Willie Horton to Elizabeth Fediay, of the non-profit group that contracted for the ad. (The Horton story had been completely public for an entire year, part of news coverage that won a Pulitzer Prize for the Lawrence (Massachusetts) Eagle-Tribune newspaper.) Willie Horton was an African-American convicted murderer released on a weekend furlough during Governor Dukakis's tenure, who escaped and committed a brutal rape in Maryland, also stabbing his victim's husband. Atwater is also credited with originating "push polls" and "whisper campaigns" that use disinformation strategies to alienate voters from opponents. A biography of Atwater, quotes him as saying in an interview toward the end of his life that he regretted some of his less ethical techniques.

In the 1992 presidential campaign, Republicans reported that they spent $6 million on a "state of the art (opposition research) war machine" to investigate Bill Clinton, who was running against George H. W. Bush. In the same election, the Clinton campaign paid more than $100,000 to a private investigator to look into allegations about Clinton's womanizing, investigating more than two dozen women.

In the 2000 presidential election, longtime opposition researcher and Nixon loyalist Roger Stone was recruited by former Secretary of State James Baker to oversee the recount of the disputed Presidential election in Miami-Dade County in 2000. Stone is credited with organizing the street demonstrations and eventual shut-down of the recount in that pivotal county.

In the 2004 presidential race, Chris Lehane, a Democratic opposition researcher attracted notoriety and built a reputation not for deploying his skills against Republican opponents, but for using them against other Democrats in the primary races. Working for retired Army general Wesley Clark, Lehane sought to establish a media "narrative" that Howard Dean was hypocritical and dishonest, based on surveys of his administrative archive as governor of Vermont.

A protege of Atwater's, Karl Rove, is considered to be the "architect" of George W. Bush's election to the governor's office in Texas, and to the presidency in 2000 and 2004. In the 2000 race, Rove is credited with masterminding the push poll that initiated the "John McCain has a black love child" whisper campaign in South Carolina. Anonymous telephone pollsters, upon determining that a voter was pro-McCain, asked the question, "Would you be more or less likely to vote for John McCain if you knew he had fathered a black child out of wedlock?" The question was not overt slander, but it prompted the president of Bob Jones University to launch his own internet campaign against McCain, and succeeded in crippling the trust of voters McCain had attracted. The Bush camp knew, as the general public did not, that in reality, John McCain was the adoptive father of a dark-skinned Bangladeshi refugee who was rescued by his wife Cindi.

In the 2008 presidential election, opposition researchers for Barack Obama unearthed the fact that John Edwards had paid $400 for haircuts at campaign expense, and supplied Politico's Ben Smith with the tip, according to a memoir later published by campaign manager David Plouffe. Though the Democratic National Committee continues to fund a research department, after the 2008 presidential election, The New York Times reported that "The legacy of the Democratic National Committee itself is hardly clear going forward. Mr. Obama effectively subsumed all the responsibilities in his campaign: fundraising, voter turn-out and opposition research.

=== U.S. executive examples ===
- Franklin Roosevelt Administration: In 1940, the White House accidentally taped a conversation of President Franklin D. Roosevelt instructing a lower level aide to disseminate a rumor about his opponent Wendell Willkie having an extramarital affair: "We can't have any of our principal speakers refer to it, but the people down the line can get it out."
- Johnson Administration: In 1964, President Lyndon B. Johnson sent 30 Federal Bureau of Investigation (FBI) agents to the Democratic National Convention in Atlantic City, N.J., to avert assassination attempts, and to monitor his political rival Robert F. Kennedy and civil rights activists. Johnson later also placed his Republican challenger, Barry Goldwater, under FBI surveillance, with a federal wiretap.
- Nixon Administration: During the Richard Nixon administration, White House staffers compiled lists of names of political opponents, journalists who had criticized Nixon, and artists and actors (such as Jane Fonda and Paul Newman) who had dissented with Nixon policy, especially on the subject of Vietnam, with the intent of prompting Internal Revenue Service investigations. The full extent of Nixon's surveillance of private citizens solely on the basis of their dissent was not known until years after Nixon was forced to resign, as former staff members such as Charles Colson and John Dean began to disclose details. Nixon's Enemies List is the informal name of what started as a list of President Richard Nixon's major political opponents compiled by Charles Colson, written by George T. Bell [1] (assistant to Colson, special counsel to the White House) and sent in memorandum form to John Dean on September 9, 1971. The list was part of a campaign officially known as "Opponents List" and "Political Enemies Project." The official purpose, as described by the White House Counsel's Office, was to "screw" Nixon's political enemies, by means of tax audits from the IRS, and by manipulating "grant availability, federal contracts, litigation, prosecution, etc."
- Ford Administration: During the Gerald Ford presidency, Deputy Assistant Dick Cheney suggested in a now-infamous memo to Donald Rumsfeld that the White House use the United States Justice Department to conduct opposition research and retaliate against political opponents and critical journalists such as Seymour Hersh and The New York Times, arguing that the executive branch had the power to prosecute journalists as they saw fit, under the provisions of the Espionage Act of 1917.
- Reagan Administration: In 1984, during the Ronald Reagan presidency, the Republican National Committee formed The Opposition Research Group, with its own budget of $1.1 million. These staff amassed information on eight Democratic presidential candidates based on data from voting records, Congressional Record speeches, media clippings and transcripts, campaign materials, all of which was stored on a computer for easy access. In this way the Reagan team was able to track inconsistencies and attack them. This original data base evolved into a network that linked information gleaned by Republicans in all 50 states, creating a master data base accessible to high-ranking Republican staff, even aboard Air Force One. Though this RNC database was accessible to both the Reagan White House and campaign team, no evidence has surfaced that U.S. federal dollars funded The Opposition Research Group or its efforts.
- Clinton Administration: During the Bill Clinton administration, the "Filegate" scandal erupted when White House staffers said to be acting on the directions of First Lady Hillary Clinton improperly accessed 500 FBI files compiled for security checks of Reagan and Bush staffers in previous administrations. Craig Livingstone, said to be hired by Mrs. Clinton with dubious credentials, resigned amid public outcry. In testimony under oath during the Kenneth Starr special prosecutor's investigation, Mrs. Clinton stated that she had neither hired Livingstone nor improperly perused the files.
- George W. Bush Administration: Two former opposition researchers for the RNC appointed to Justice Department posts, Timothy Griffin and Monica Goodling, were implicated in efforts to use data collected on Democratic-appointed federal attorneys as ground for dismissal. Also during this administration, Counterintelligence Field Activity (CIFA), an intelligence gathering arm of the Pentagon was disbanded in 2008, after investigations into the bribery activities directed at Duke Cunningham revealed that the U.S. government kept a sizeable database of information about 126 domestic peace activist groups, including Quakers, about 1,500 "suspicious incidents" including peace demonstrations outside armed forces recruiter offices, even though the groups posed no specified threat to national security. The program was known as Talon. About two years elapsed between the program's disbanding and the Post report. The Washington Post quoted an unnamed "official" as saying, "On the surface, it looks like things in the database that were determined not to be viable threats were never deleted but should have been", the official said. "You can also make the argument that these things should never have been put in the database in the first place until they were confirmed as threats."
- Barack Obama Administration: In February 2009, Shauna Daly, a former opposition researcher for the Democratic National Committee was appointed as a researcher for the White House's Office of Legal Counsel. Daly was Barack Obama's deputy research director during the presidential campaign, spent much of the cycle rebutting viral online attacks on Obama's character and biography under the rubric of "Stop the Smears." Shortly thereafter, amid speculations that she would be conducting research against political opponents, she was reassigned as Research Director to the DNC. Politico.com reported on February 27, 2009, that "the counsel's office – which doesn't face the sort of rapid-response demands that were common in the late Clinton years – doesn't plan to fill the research post." The American Spectator reported on its "Washington Prowler" blog that Daly was posted in the White House Counsel's Office for "about a month", and thus had access to "reams of Bush administration documents related to such things as the firings of U.S. Attorney, the use and internal debate over the USA PATRIOT Act, FISA and the Scooter Libby and Karl Rove investigations. The "Prowler" quoted "a DNC staffer" as saying, "She realized that she could do more with all the material she saw outside of the building than inside where she'd be bound by the rules and legalities of the White House Counsel's Office. Now she isn't. She's good at what she does; her time at the White House means we've got a mother load (sic) of material that will have Republicans scrambling. At least that's what we hope."

=== U.S. Supreme Court examples ===
In 1916, after President Woodrow Wilson nominated Louis Brandeis for the Supreme Court, "concerned" citizens seeking to block his confirmation offered information that Brandeis was a "radical Zionist", even though he was not a practicing Jew. Brandeis aggressively outmaneuvered his detractors by mounting his own opposition research efforts, including a carefully constructed chart that exposed the social and financial connections of the group, mostly from Boston's Back Bay, and including Harvard president Lawrence Lowell, as well as a group headed by former President William Howard Taft and a host of American Bar Association past presidents. Brandeis sent the chart to Walter Lippmann at the New Republic who penned an editorial condemning "the most homogeneous, self-centered, and self-complacent community in the United States." Brandeis was confirmed after four months of hearings, in a Senate vote of 47–22.

Ronald Reagan nominated Judge Robert Bork for appointment to the U.S. Supreme Court in 1987, prompting a Senate floor speech from Democratic Massachusetts senator Ted Kennedy, which later became known as the "Robert Bork's America" speech:

Robert Bork's America is a land in which women would be forced into back-alley abortions, blacks would sit at segregated lunch counters, rogue police could break down citizens' doors in midnight raids, schoolchildren could not be taught about evolution, writers and artists could be censored at the whim of the Government, and the doors of the Federal courts would be shut on the fingers of millions of citizens for whom the judiciary is – and is often the only – protector of the individual rights that are the heart of our democracy.

Kennedy's speech prompted a rapid-response opposition research effort from Democrats, but the White House waited two and a half months to respond. The Senate Judiciary Committee, under the direction of Delaware senator and presidential hopeful Joseph Biden, commissioned a report in response to the materials Reagan's staff had released in support of Bork's nomination. Prepared by a panel of lawyers, including two Duke University law professors, the 78-page became known as "The Biden Report." The report detailed Bork's record, and analyzed the pattern of his rulings, and deeming him to be a conservative "activist" rather than an impartial jurist. Ultimately, Bork's embattled nomination failed, and Anthony Kennedy (no relation to Ted) was later confirmed to fill the position. The fierce research-based opposition to Bork's nomination attracted significant media attention, even though a Gallup Poll on the eve of the confirmation vote showed that very few Americans could name the nominee in question, much less recall his rulings. A new verb was later coined; "to bork" a candidate or nominee by mounting such voluminous research and vocal opposition that the person in question would be forced to withdraw.

After President George W. Bush nominated Harriet Miers to the U.S. Supreme Court, the Boston Globe reported that Republican conservative advocacy groups were conducting opposition research against her: "Groups are circulating lists of questions they want members of the Senate Judiciary Committee to ask Miers at her confirmation hearings. The activists' thinly veiled hope is that Miers will reveal ignorance of the law and give senators a reason to oppose her." Miers later withdrew her name from consideration for the court.

On July 7, 2005, soon after the resignation of Justice Sandra Day O'Connor, the Democratic National Committee gathered and circulated information on the "anti-civil rights" and "anti-immigrant" rulings of Samuel Alito, by then nominated by President George W. Bush to replace her. Upon inspection, the documents were revealed to have been amended by Devorah Adler, research director for the DNC. Alito's "record" had been pointedly altered to present him in a negative light. While the incident was not unusual, it received publicity in prominent places because it drew attention to the "meta-data" that is often unwittingly stored in documents that are altered and forwarded electronically.

On May 2, 2009, after Supreme Court Justice David Souter announced his intent to retire from the court, The New York Times reported that Curt Levey, executive director of the Committee for Justice, had noted that conservatives were "focusing opposition research efforts on 17 women, whom they have divided into two tiers based on their perceived chances."

=== U.S. states ===
Seven aides to members of the Pennsylvania House of Representatives pleaded guilty on January 7, 2010, to illegal use of state resources for campaign activities, including opposition research against the political opponents of incumbent officeholders during 2007. These seven were Democrats; a total of 25 indictments have been handed down to a mix of Democrats and Republican politicians.

During Lamar Alexander's 2002 campaign for the U.S. Senate, Alexander's campaign staff received an anonymous mailing of a photograph of opponent Bob Clement obviously serving as a board member of a failed bank whose owners had been imprisoned for bank fraud. When the Alexander campaign raised the issue of Clement's financial ties with the convicted felons, Clement denied any connection. When the Alexander campaign produced the photograph as evidence, Clement claimed his role was only an informal advisory one.

In early July 2009 Alaska governor Sarah Palin announced that she would be resigning as governor, partly due to complications from opposition research and ethics inquiries after her inclusion on the 2008 GOP presidential race ballot as John McCain's running mate. At a later news conference Palin told reporters, "Obviously conditions had changed so drastically on August 29, the day I was tapped to be VP", she said. "The opposition research and the games that began there — which I think is the new normal in Alaska politics, until I hand the reins over to Sean Parnell — have been so distracting."

In the Pennsylvania state legislature in July 2009, former state House Democratic Campaign Committee Chair, Rep. Stephen Stetler found himself amidst an investigation when he rejected a plan that would have shifted the job of opposition research from employees on the state payroll to private firms. Attorney General Tom Corbett alleged that millions in public funds were paid to state employees who did such research on the 2006 and 2004 campaigns of Democrats in the state. Stetler left the House after 2006 to become the state's revenue secretary. A former aide, Dan Wiedemer testified before grand jurors that the suggestion to remove politically motivated research from the hands of public employees "was more or less shot down." Though Stetler has not been charged, 12 former House members and members of their staff were charged with diverting public funds for political campaign work. Stetler was among those subpoenaed, said Chuck Ardo, a spokesman for Democratic Gov. Ed Rendell. The hearing will be held before President Judge Richard Lewis in September.

== Mass media ethics ==
The practice of using tips from opposition research sources was examined in 1994 by Howard Kurtz, media analyst for The Washington Post. Kurtz surveyed the major networks, Newsweek, The Wall Street Journal, the Los Angeles Times, and other influential media outlets, and found varying levels of use of oppo research information on David Hale as a witness in the Whitewater controversy. At this time, Brown confirmed that he had been the source of four mainstream media stories that had received attention from the Columbia Journalism Review because they bore striking resemblance to the opposition research being disseminated by Citizens United.

"Far from being detached observers, reporters constantly call oppo staffs looking for tidbits and sometimes trading information", wrote three reporters, Matthew Cooper, Gloria Borger, and Michael Barone, for U.S. News & World Report in 1992.

== Political infighting ==
In spring 2007, Roger Stone, a political consultant in the employ of New York state senator Joseph Bruno, resigned after leaving threatening phone messages on the answering machine of the 85-year-old father of New York Governor Eliot Spitzer, alleging that Spitzer's campaign finances were conducted improperly. In November of that same year, Stone sent a letter to the FBI detailing Spitzer's sexual preferences with prostitutes and sexual props, right down to his black calf-length socks. Stone was considered to be an authoritative source because he frequented the same prostitutes himself as a client. A subsequent Justice Department investigation produced evidence that ultimately led to Spitzer's resignation as governor. Bruno, Stone's client, has been a longtime political enemy of Spitzer.
