= Devorah Adler =

Political consultant

- Occupations: Political consultant and opposition research specialist
- Known for: Founder of Beehive Researchers; Political consultant hired during Obama's 2008 campaign
- Political party: Democratic

Devorah Adler is a political consultant and was opposition research specialist for the Democratic National Committee in the United States. Adler is the founder of Beehive Researchers. A former assistant director for health policy during the Bill Clinton presidency, Adler later served as director of research for the Democratic National Committee in the 2006 election cycle, and served as Director of Research for the Barack Obama campaign for the 2008 Democratic presidential nomination.

Adler was one of the Obama 2008 campaign's first hires in January 2007, assigned to debunk a widely circulated anonymous set of emails that rumored Obama was Muslim. Interviewed at that time by Politico.com, Adler said, "We've been bird-dogging it from the beginning; the first research document that I put together was a response to the 'Who is Barack Obama?' email."

She served as the Executive Secretary at the U.S. Trade Representative (USTR) in 2009.
