= Tom Cochran (technologist) =

American technologist and former government official (born 1977)

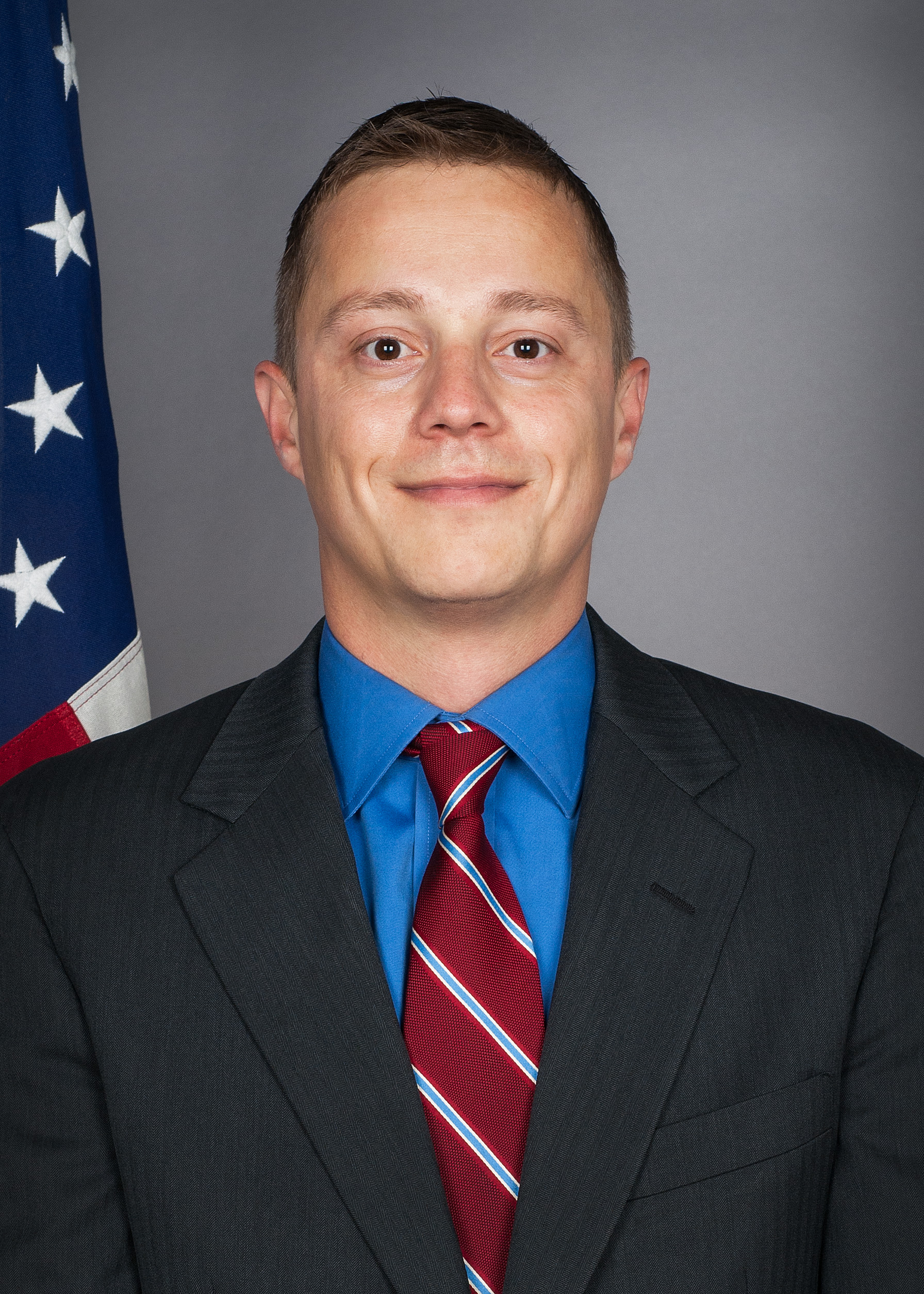
- Official U.S. Department of State Photo
- Born: Thomas Cochran; 1977 (age 48–49)
- Education: Vanderbilt University
- Website: www.thomascochran.com

Tom Cochran (born 1977) is an American technologist and former Obama administration appointee who served in the White House and Department of State between 2011 and 2016. He later co-founded Civic Sunlight, a service that uses artificial intelligence to summarize local government meetings.

== Early life and education ==
Cochran grew up both in Japan and Thailand due to his father's job as a foreign service officer. He attended a British Anglican school in Kobe, and International School Bangkok while living in Thailand. He graduated from Phillips Exeter Academy in New Hampshire in 1996. Following high school, he went to Vanderbilt University in Nashville, Tennessee, graduating with a degree in economics.

== Career ==
Following university, he moved to the Washington, D.C., area to work as an IT consultant for now-defunct American Management Systems. While there, he worked as the lead developer on a patented content management system and a patent-pending feedback management system.

He was hired by Blue State Digital as their first employee, shortly after the company was founded, following the end of Howard Dean's 2004 presidential campaign. There, he was a senior developer, helping design and build the technology to power the Democratic National Committee's digital engagement efforts for the 2006 mid-term elections. This software eventually evolved into the platform behind the 2008 Obama presidential campaign.

=== Obama administration ===
Cochran joined the Obama White House in 2011 as the first director of new media technologies, responsible for the technology behind WhiteHouse.gov. He also led the engineering team charged with designing and building We the People to allow Americans to directly petition the government on any issue.

He left in 2012 to join Atlantic Media as their chief technology officer. As CTO, he performed a study on the company's use of email, calculating that each email actually cost the company the equivalent of 95 cents in lost labor, and added up to over a million dollars. The study ended up as part of Cal Newport's book Deep Work: Rules for Focused Success in a Distracted World (2016).

In 2014, he was appointed by President Obama to the State Department, helping "take the lessons of the Obama campaign and apply them for American foreign policy around the globe" joining former White House digital colleague, Macon Phillips. While at the department, he was responsible for launching ShareAmerica, a government Upworthy clone that is a "digital-first platform with socially-optimized content that was policy relevant," available in seven languages to cover an audience of 4 billion people.

=== Post-administration ===
After leaving the Obama administration in 2016, Cochran was tapped to lead the public sector practice as chief digital strategist for Acquia, a Boston-based software-as-a-service company. In October 2018, he was hired to run the digital and integrated marketing practice for Edelman in Washington, DC. In July 2019, he left Edelman to rejoin 720 Strategies as partner and chief growth officer.

After relocating to Maine, Cochran co-founded Civic Sunlight in 2024, a service that uses large language models to produce summaries of local government meetings as free email newsletters. The service launched in Camden, Maine, and expanded to cover communities across several states, but early summaries contained factual errors, prompting a partnership with local newsrooms including the Midcoast Villager to add human editorial oversight.

Cochran speaks internationally on his government experience pushing digital and cultural transformation. He emphasizes a change management approach focusing on establishing credibility, embracing risk, and adopting emerging technologies. He was an adjunct professor at American University and a writer, having contributed to publications including Harvard Business Review, Quartz, and Entrepreneur.
