= Leigh Heyman =

American government official

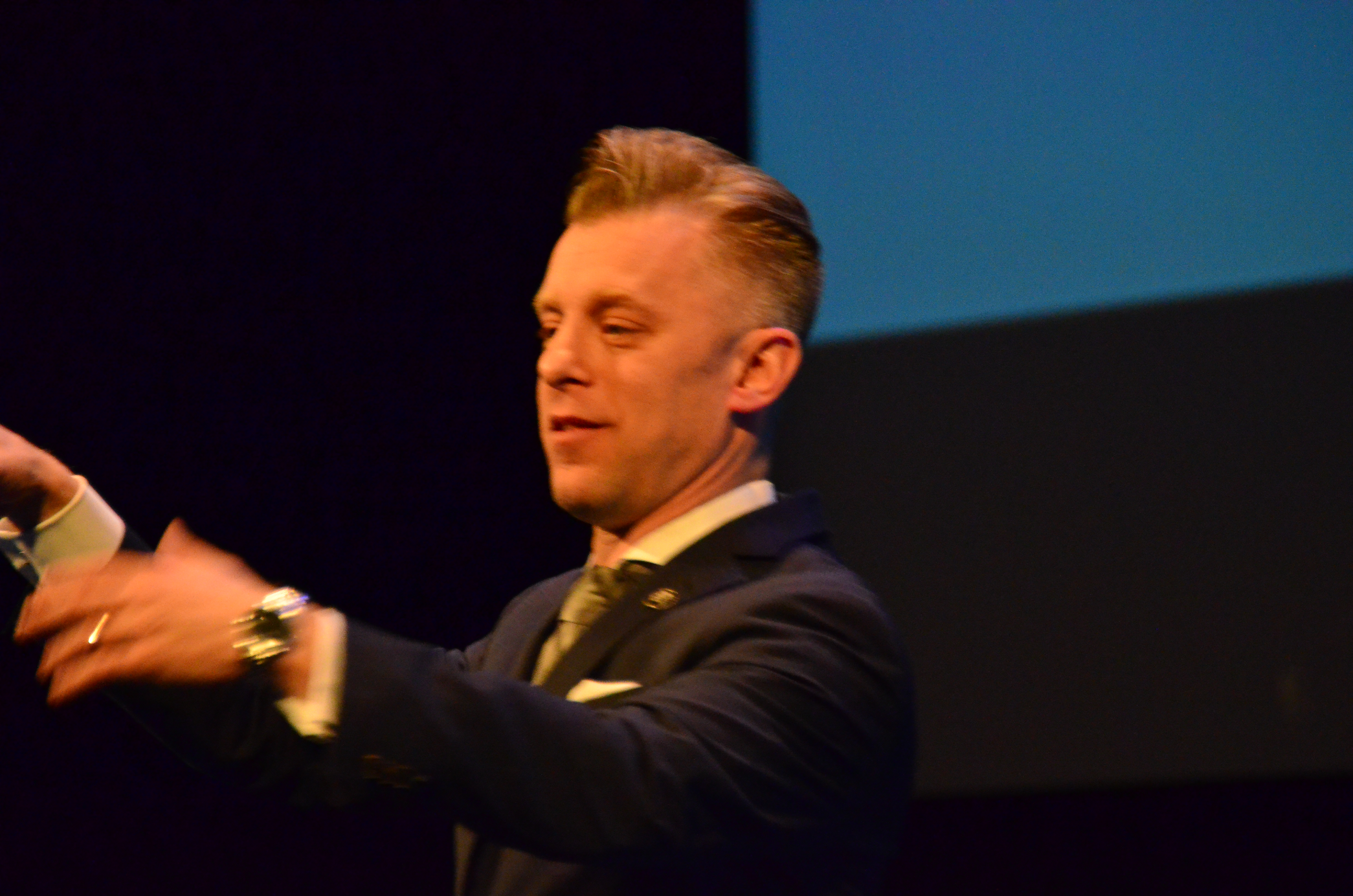
- Leigh Heyman speaking at Digital Summit AZ (2015)
- Education: Sarah Lawrence College (BA) Massachusetts Institute of Technology (MBA)
- Occupation: digital transformation consultant

Leigh Heyman is the former Director of New Media Technologies for the Obama White House, where he served from 2011 to 2015, and a retired U.S. National Team coxswain.

Prior to serving in the Obama administration, Heyman ran the technology infrastructure for Blue State Digital, a digital political consulting firm for Democratic clients, including the Democratic National Committee and the Barack Obama presidential campaign. At MySQLConf 09, Heyman stated that his team managed the technology platform for the winning campaign.

In 2011, he joined the White House digital team. At the White House, Heyman focused on supporting the digital program for President Obama, focusing largely on Whitehouse.gov leveraging open source technology like Drupal to launch We the People to allow people to petition the administration on any issue. He and his team were also responsible for the high-traffic live stream of the State of the Union speech.

Heyman oversaw the release of APIs permitting external access to data created by the We the People petition website. The release of the "write API" exposed the first U.S. government API permitting data to be written on systems by outside third-party applications.

Heyman coxed the U.S. National Team Lightweight Men's Eight to 5th place at the 2007 World Rowing Championships in Munich, Germany.
