= Mollom =

Web service that analysed website content

- Owner: Acquia
- Website: www.mollom.com
- Commercial: Yes
- Registration: Required
- Launched: 31 March 2008; 18 years ago
- Current status: Offline

Mollom was a web service that analyzed the quality of content posted to websites. This included comments, contact-form messages, blogs, and forum posts. Mollom screened all contributions before they were posted to participating websites.

== Overview ==
Mollom was originally developed by Dries Buytaert, who was also the founder and lead developer of the Drupal CMS. It used three specific technologies to detect spam and malicious content - machine learning, text analytics, and CAPTCHA. According to Acquia, between Mollom's launch in March 2008 and its acquisition by Acquia in August 2012, Mollom had blocked over one billion spam messages for its customers, including Sony Music, Stanford University, and Twitter.

Mollom was acquired by Acquia in August 2012. On April 27, 2017, the company announced it would stop the sale of Mollom service on May 1, 2017. The service shut down completely on April 2, 2018, having blocked more than 13.5 billion spam comments since its inception.
