= Blog for America =

- Blog post from Christmas Day, 2003
- Website type: Campaign Blog
- Website: http://www.blogforamerica.com/
- Current status: Archived

Blog for America was the title of the official Howard Dean campaign blog from March 2003 to March, 2004. It was previously known as the Dean Call To Action blog, the first presidential campaign weblog, founded by Mathew Gross on March 15, 2003, but became BFA when it was rebuilt using Movable Type by Marc Chadwick and Mathew Gross. It is widely recognized as the first effective campaign blog, and is credited (along with the Howard Dean Meetup) with enabling a new paradigm for grassroots campaigning. Using the blog, Dean campaign members were able to effectively communicate with supporters, posting frequent updates on the candidate, his supporters, his organization, his views, and his detractors. The comments section of Blog for America was noted for high activity and loyalty, and was an effective means of self-organization for Dean's committed followers. The blog is also credited with powering the Dean campaign's impressive fundraising abilities during the 2004 Democratic presidential primary.

However, the limits of the blog's effectiveness as a campaign tool were seen in Iowa and New Hampshire, where despite a large financial, media, and organizational head start, Dean made a poor showing in voter support.

Technological issues often created havoc for the blog's administrators and visitors. For example, a common device used by trolls was to spoof the usernames of existing members using a loophole in the member naming conventions. Although the bug in the blog software was never found, to the administrators' credit, these trolls were quickly blocked. In October 2006, new blog software was released which corrected the spoofing problems of the previous version.

Blog for America was transformed in March, 2004 into the house blog for the grassroots recruitment organization Democracy for America, paralleling the conversion of the campaign into a Democratic non-profit organization.

== Selected Bloggers ==
- Mathew Gross (March 2003 - January 2004)
- Zephyr Teachout (March 2003 - February 2004)
- Joe Rospars (July 2003 - February 2004, as a consultant April 2004 - February 2005)
- Alison Stanton (March 1, 2004 - July 31, 2004)
- Tanner Brooks (March 1, 2004 - July 2004)
- Tara Liloia (July 2004 – present)

== See also ==
- Internet activism
