= Ben Self =

Chair of the Kentucky Democratic Party

Chair of the Kentucky Democratic Party
- In office November 11, 2017 – November 14, 2020
- Preceded by: Sannie Overly
- Succeeded by: Colmon Elridge

Personal details
- Born: 1977 (age 48–49) Lexington, Kentucky, U.S.
- Party: Democratic
- Spouse: Becca
- Children: 2
- Education: Massachusetts Institute of Technology (BS, MS)

Ben Self is the former chairman of the Kentucky Democratic Party, having been elected in November 2017. He was a co-founder for digital strategy firm Blue State Digital and is co-founder of West Sixth Brewery in Lexington, Kentucky.

== Early life ==
He grew up in Lexington his entire youth and after graduating from high school, went off to Boston to study electrical engineering and computer science at Massachusetts Institute of Technology, graduating with a bachelor's in 1999 and completing a master's in 2000.

After university, Self moved to the Washington, D.C. suburbs, starting a job as a government IT consultant for now-defunct American Management Systems.

== Dean Campaign & Blue State Digital ==
His shifted industries when he departed professional consulting and volunteered for the Howard Dean presidential campaign, starting in the fall of 2003. Because of the application of new media and digital to political campaigns, in a 2011 interview with PBS's One-on-One, Self stated "we didn't know at the time, but [it] was changing the world of politics forever." It was on the ill-fated, but technologically progressive campaign that he crossed paths with Jascha Franklin-Hodge, Clay Johnson, and Joe Rospars.

The four of them would go on to found Blue State Digital following the end of the Dean campaign in early 2004, to commercialize the technology powering the campaign and apply them to Democratic political campaigns and causes around the United States. He remained a partner in the firm while serving as the Democratic National Committee's (DNC) technology director from 2005 to 2009. As director, he oversaw the overhaul of critical platforms to help power the Democrats to regaining the majority in Congress during the United States elections of 2006.

His final year at the DNC, he and his team helped support the presidential campaign for Barack Obama, in partnership with his firm, Blue State Digital and the technology staff for the campaign. He left the DNC following Obama's first inauguration, spending a little over a year working back with his company. His final year involved work in Australia to help then-prime minister Kevin Rudd engage the public and use technology in political campaigns.

== After Blue State Digital ==
In January 2010, he sold his stake in Blue State Digital and planted himself full-time back in his hometown of Lexington. While living in Kentucky, he founded a brewery, West Sixth Brewery.

Self is a native of and currently lives in Lexington with his wife, Becca, and their two children.

Party political offices
Preceded by Sannie Overly	Chair of the Kentucky Democratic Party; 2017–2021	Succeeded by Colmon Elridge
