= Jeremy Curtin =

American diplomat

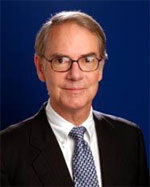

4th Coordinator for International Information Programs
- In office April 19, 2007 – December 2009
- President: George W. Bush
- Preceded by: Alexander C. Feldman
- Succeeded by: Dawn McCall

Personal details
- Education: University of Toronto; University of Virginia
- Awards: Superior Honor Award; Meritorious Honor Award; GLIFAA Equality Award

Jeremy F. Curtin is a career member of the Senior Foreign Service of the United States with the rank of Career Minister. Curtin has held a number of positions in the U.S. Information Agency, the National Security Council, and the U.S. State Department. From 2007 to 2009, he served as the State Department's Coordinator for International Information Programs. He has served the United States in various diplomatic posts overseas - namely, South Korea, Finland and Poland.

== Education ==
Curtin holds an undergraduate degree from the University of Toronto and a Ph.D from the University of Virginia.

== Career ==
Curtin joined the U.S. Foreign Service in 1975. Curtin served overseas in Seoul, Helsinki, and Warsaw. In the mid-1980s, he was Executive Secretary and spokesman for the U.S. Delegation to the Stockholm Conference on Disarmament in Europe, which successfully negotiated military confidence-building measures between NATO and the Warsaw Pact.

From 1986 to 1991, Curtin held a number of positions, including Director of International Programs for the National Security Council and Special Assistant to the Deputy Secretary of State. After the fall of the Berlin Wall, Curtin worked with the U.S. Agency for International Development, directing a program to support independent media in Eastern Europe. From 2002 to 2005, Curtin was chief of staff and senior adviser to the Under Secretary of State for Public Diplomacy and Public Affairs.

Curtin was appointed the Coordinator of International Information Programs in the State Department on April 19, 2007, succeeding Alexander C. Feldman. Curtin served as the head of the Bureau of International Information Programs until December 2009.

Under Secretary of State Hillary Clinton, Curtin served as a human resources adviser on LGBT issues for the State Department. He assisted in implementing Secretary Clinton's policy on extending benefits such as U.S. diplomatic passports, access to medical care, and housing to the partners of gay and lesbian Foreign Service Officers.

Curtin is currently a senior fellow at the USC Annenberg School for Communication and Journalism.

== Awards ==
In June 2012, Curtin was awarded the annual Equality Award by Gays and Lesbians in Foreign Affairs Agencies for promoting benefits for LGBT diplomats and their partners.

Curtin has also been awarded a Superior Honor Award from the U.S. Information Agency for his work on the Stockholm Conference, a Meritorious Honor Award for his work on democracy-building in Eastern Europe, and a Presidential Meritorious Service Award for his service in Korea.

Government offices
Preceded by Alexander C. Feldman	Coordinator for International Information Programs; April 19, 2007–December 2009	Succeeded by Dawn McCall
