= Clay Johnson (technologist) =

American computer programmer (born 1977)

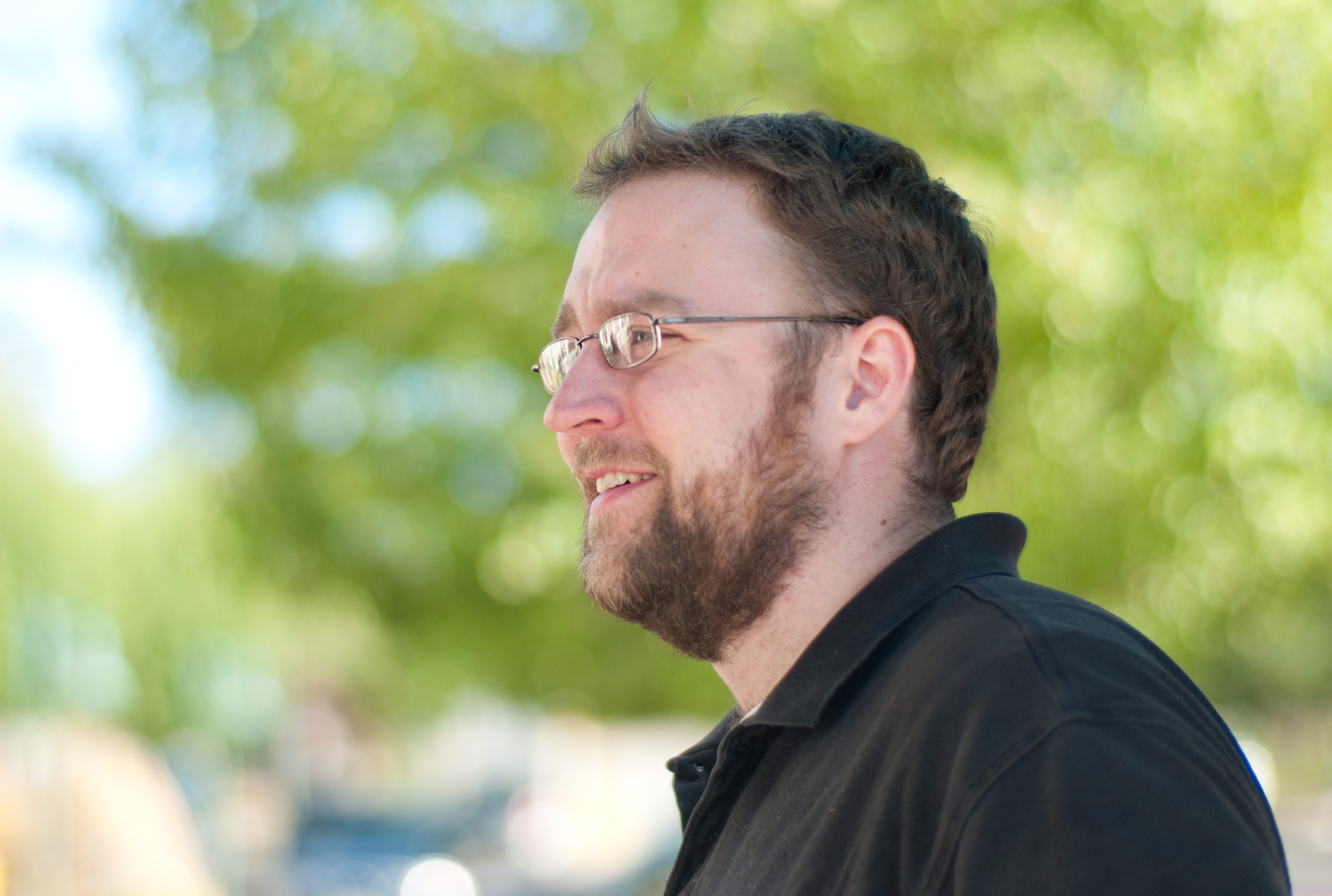
- Johnson, 2009
- Born: 1977 (age 48–49)
- Education: University of Rhode Island Pace Academy
- Political party: Democratic

Clay Johnson is a former American Democratic technologist who played a role in prominent national campaigns.

== Career ==
In 2004, Johnson was the lead programmer for Howard Dean’s unsuccessful bid for the Democratic nomination for president.

After the Dean campaign ended, Johnson joined three other Dean for America staff members (Ben Self, Jascha Franklin-Hodge, and Joe Rospars), to found Blue State Digital, a company that provides technology services and online strategy for Democratic campaigns, including the 2008 Barack Obama Presidential Campaign. In 2006, Blue State Digital was one of Fast Company’s Fast 50. In 2007, Johnson was "asked to leave" the company due to issues with other members of the partnership.

From 2008 until 2010, he worked for the Sunlight Foundation as director of Sunlight Labs, an open source community that collected and organized public data. In August 2012, Johnson became a Presidential Innovation Fellow and worked on a project called RFP-EZ, a digital utility to improve the success rate of small IT firms in acquiring government contracts. In 2014, Johnson was named a senior fellow of the Center for American Progress.

Johnson co-founded the Department of Better Technology (DOBT), a for-profit company that provides technology services to government agencies. DOBT was acquired by CityBase in 2017.

Over several election cycles, Johnson contributed to Democratic political candidates including Brian Forde and Doug Jones in 2017, Michelle Nunn in 2014, as well as Zephyr Teachout in 2016. Teachout was involved in informing Dean campaign leadership of Johnson's sexual misconduct during the 2004 presidential campaign.

== Sexual misconduct accusations ==
Johnson has been accused of sexual misconduct and mistreatment by multiple women during his tenure on the Howard Dean campaign and employment at the Sunlight Foundation. In 2018, HuffPost reported the stories of several women who alleged Johnson engaged in sexual misconduct, including attempted rape, sexual assault and verbal abuse in the workplace. Johnson stated to HuffPost in interviews that his overall behavior during that period of his life "filled him with shame, hurt and regret", attributing some behavior to substance abuse. He disputed many details of the accusations made against him.

== Other professional accomplishments ==
Prior to his work in political campaigns, Johnson worked at Ask Jeeves, now Ask.com, as a technologist helping with web syndication. Along with John Petropoulos, Johnson invented the use of mouseover preview ability in search results for which they were granted a patent in 2006.

In January 2012, Johnson published The Information Diet: A Case for Conscious Consumption.

== Recognition ==
In 2009, he was the Google-O’Reilly Open Source Community Builder of the Year, and in 2010, one of Federal Computer Week's Fed 100.
