= Jascha Franklin-Hodge =

American civil servant (born 1979)

- Born: 1979 (age 46–47)
- Education: Massachusetts Institute of Technology (did not graduate)

Jascha Franklin-Hodge is an American civil servant. He served as the chief information officer for the city under Mayor Marty Walsh, chief of streets for the City of Boston, Massachusetts under Mayor Michelle Wu, and co-founded digital consulting firm Blue State Digital. In his role as Chief of Streets, he oversaw the Boston Transportation Department and Public Works Department.

== Early life and career ==
Franklin-Hodge entered Massachusetts Institute of Technology to study computer science. His passion for software began before university when he worked for Software Tool & Die, based in Brookline, Massachusetts. He continued his software development career at Art Technology Group through his first year at MIT. Before his sophomore year, he left school in 1998 to work full-time at Spinner in the Bay Area before the company was acquired by AOL to become AOL Music, an early digital venture into online music.

== Dean campaign and Blue State Digital ==
He left AOL in 2003 to join the upstart and dark-horse presidential campaign for Howard Dean, heading to Vermont to lead the technology team powering the first new-media focused political campaign. At the campaign he was introduced to his eventual co-founders of Blue State Digital, Clay Johnson, Joe Rospars, and Ben Self.

After the campaign folded in early 2004, the four founded Blue State Digital, with offices in Boston and Washington, D.C. The mission was to replicate the new media success of the Howard Dean presidential campaign and provide the same technology to progressive and democratic political candidates across the country.

Franklin-Hodge spent 10 years as a partner and chief technology officer for the company, including the infrastructure powering the company's biggest client, the 2008 Obama presidential campaign. The company was acquired by WPP in 2010. By the time he left the company, the technology he oversaw had raised over $1.6 billion and sent over 24 billion emails on behalf of over 500 clients.

== Post-Blue State Digital and public service ==
He left the company in 2014 when Mayor Marty Walsh of Boston named him the new chief information officer for the city, with the mandate of modernizing the IT infrastructure for the city government, and creating the first digital office to implement 21st-century digital citizen services for city residents. He focused city technology teams on data and analytics to drive citizen-focused decisions. In January 2018, he stepped down from his position, leaving public service.

He once again joined the City of Boston when Mayor Michelle Wu appointed him as Chief of Streets in December 2021. His tenure during Mayor Wu's first term, from January 2022 through November 2025, was marked by the expansion of bus and bike lanes throughout the city.
