= Digitizing AAR Archive =

The Archives at the American Academy in Rome (AAR) are digitized archaeological and photographic collections assisting in the preservation and conservation of the cultural heritage of Rome.

== Background and history ==
The rich cultural heritage of Rome compelled a group of American architects and artists led by architectural mogul Charles F. McKim to establish the American Academy in the city of Rome, Italy. Established in 1894, the American Academy in Rome is a research and arts institute and a member of the Council of American Overseas Research Centers.

The Academy promotes intellectual and artistic freedom, interdisciplinary exchange and innovation amongst scholars and artists at the institution and around the world. The School of Fine Arts, the first of the Academy's two main schools, exposes its fellows to literature, historic preservation and conservation, architecture, musical composition and the visual arts. Its counterpart, the School of Classical Studies, immerses scholars in Rome’s exquisite history and culture both modern and ancient, mainly in the fields of archaeology and the humanities.

The United States Congress under President Roosevelt passed bills in 1905, marking the Academy as a national institution.

== Archaeological archives ==
As an institution of the arts and classics, fellows at the Academy practice the study of archaeology. The American Academy in Rome has consolidated documents pertaining to archaeological excavations performed at the ancient colony of Cosa and the ancient Roman headquarters, the Regia. Some of these documents were digitized to preserve and disseminate their contents.

The ancient Latin colony of Cosa was located in southwestern Tuscany in Italy. The Regia was an ancient building that served initially as a royal palace to the kings of Rome and was subsequently occupied by the Pontifex Maximus, most notably Julius Caesar.

The Cosa archaeology archives are a collection of documents pertaining to the excavations performed at the site by Frank E. Brown and Elizabeth Fentress. The Cosa collection consists of 1260 gelatin plates, 2500 film negatives and 13000 prints. Frank E. Brown again led the excavations of Regia’s Forum Romanum and left an archive consisting of photos, plans, notebooks, section and find cards. The Regia collection consists of 70 contacts, 97 digital images, and 7 films. The physical archives of both Cosa and Regia excavations are safeguarded by the Academy. Photographs of the Cosa archives have been digitized, while the contents from Brown’s Regia physical archive were digitized in 2014. The digitized versions of the Cosa and Regia Archives are available in the Academy's Digital Humanities Center.

== Photographic archives ==
The Photo Archive of the American Academy in Rome contains more than eighty thousand images. The Photo Archive consolidates various photographic images relating to the arts, architecture, archaeology, and history. Photos collected from various donors were digitized and made accessible to researchers and scholars around the world. The majority of the photographic images in the collection were amassed during the 19th century and 20th century. Only a few recent images portraying archaeological excavations and antiquities were obtained from the Vermeule, Aronson and Knauer, Ludwig and McCann collections and added to the collection since the end of the twentieth century. The archaeology archives of Cosa and Regia were obtained as part of the McCann collection.

== Digitizing the archives ==
The Digital Humanities Center employs Drupal software and ArchiveSpace for management of their data, which are then stored on the Academy's Fedora repository. ArchiveSpace enables the Academy to provide online access to their repository to researchers, scholars and artists worldwide. The Fedora Repository system allows for the management, dissemination and preservation of the Academy's digital contents.
