= American Spaces =

American public diplomacy program

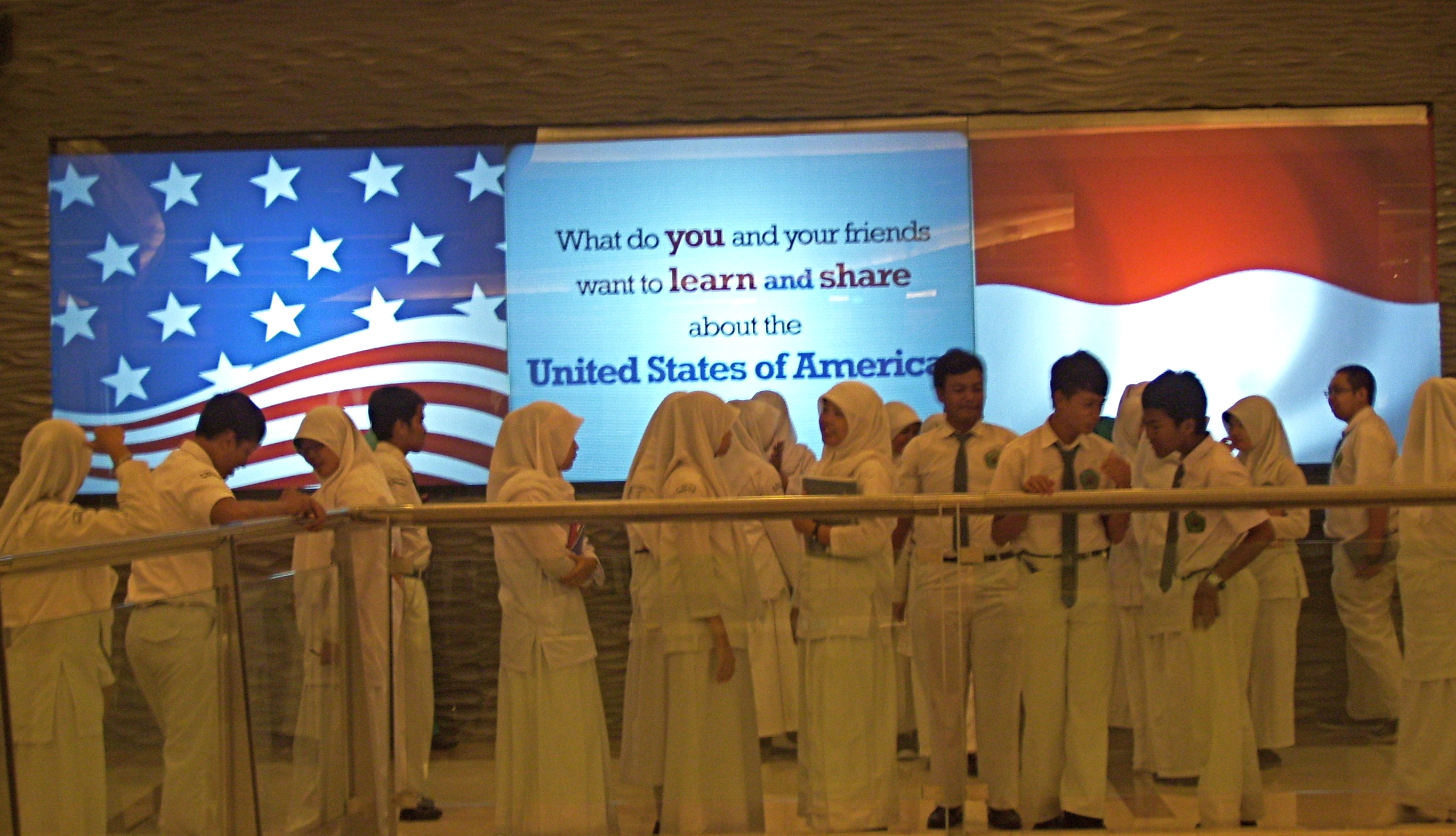
Students at @america in Jakarta, Indonesia

American Spaces is an umbrella program of the Bureau of Educational and Cultural Affairs, a bureau within the United States Department of State, to provide physical locations and applicable media with which to conduct public diplomacy. Created in the early 20th century for "countering disinformation and influencing international public opinion," these spaces, of various types and sizes, often feature unrestricted internet access as well as the rental of American books, periodicals, and DVDs.

Following World War II, these spaces proliferated in the form of libraries, Binational Centers, standalone American Centers, and America Houses all of which were brought under the "American Spaces" program in 2008. The threat of terrorism directed against these facilities resulted in the transfer of locations into either American Corners within local libraries or Information Resource Centers within US embassies. Each of these spaces exists to spread US soft power abroad.

== Overview ==
The American Corner in the Bayalinov National Library of Kyrgyzstan hosts a "talking club" between U.S. service members deployed to the Transit Center at Manas and Kyrgyz students, offering the students a chance to practice their English with native speakers.

The Office of American Spaces, subordinate to the Bureau of International Information Programs, oversees the operation of hundreds of U.S. public diplomacy locations worldwide. American Spaces was created in 2008 by Judith McHale, then the Under Secretary of State for Public Diplomacy and Public Affairs, as an umbrella program for a host of preexisting public diplomacy initiatives. The American Spaces portfolio includes three groups of entities (American Centers, Bi-national Centers, and American Corners), some of which predate the 1953 establishment of the United States Information Agency with which some of these programs had been associated. Coupled with small literature desks in U.S. embassies called Information Resource Centers (IRCs), these spaces, as tools of public diplomacy, started as large open libraries for mass consumption in the early 20th century but shifted in the 1970s-1980s into smaller public policy-oriented reference desks aimed to influence decision-makers and professionals abroad.

The American Spaces provide physical space to support U.S. priorities through the conduct of the five main public diplomacy activities: the provision of news and information about the U.S., English-language instruction as well as EducationUSA advisement, cultural programming and events, and the continued recruitment of local nationals into U.S. exchange programs with ongoing alumni engagement. A study at American Spaces across East Asia and the Pacific published in 2016 by the International Federation of Library Associations and Institutions indicated that massive open online courses hosted in those American Spaces " increased open educational engagement with library users."

Paired with increased security concerns Post-9/11, the United States has returned to providing broader content for the mass audience as, some in the U.S. Government have concluded, American culture better carries the message of the nation than its spokespeople do. During fiscal year 2014, the Office of American Spaces operated a US$9 million budget while also directing $15 million in other funding for the renovation of existing spaces. During that year, the 715 American Spaces worldwide received 31.7 million visitors and, not counting bi-national centers, most of those visits were to the 37 standalone American Centers. As of 2017, the American Spaces program consisted of 659 American Centers, 111 Binational Centers, 443 American Corners, and 105 IRCs receiving more than 58.9 million visitors that year. Among public diplomacy programs, only the American Spaces and China's Confucius Institutes utilize a model of cost-sharing with local partners.

== World Wars, libraries, and Binational Centers ==
=== Binational Centers ===
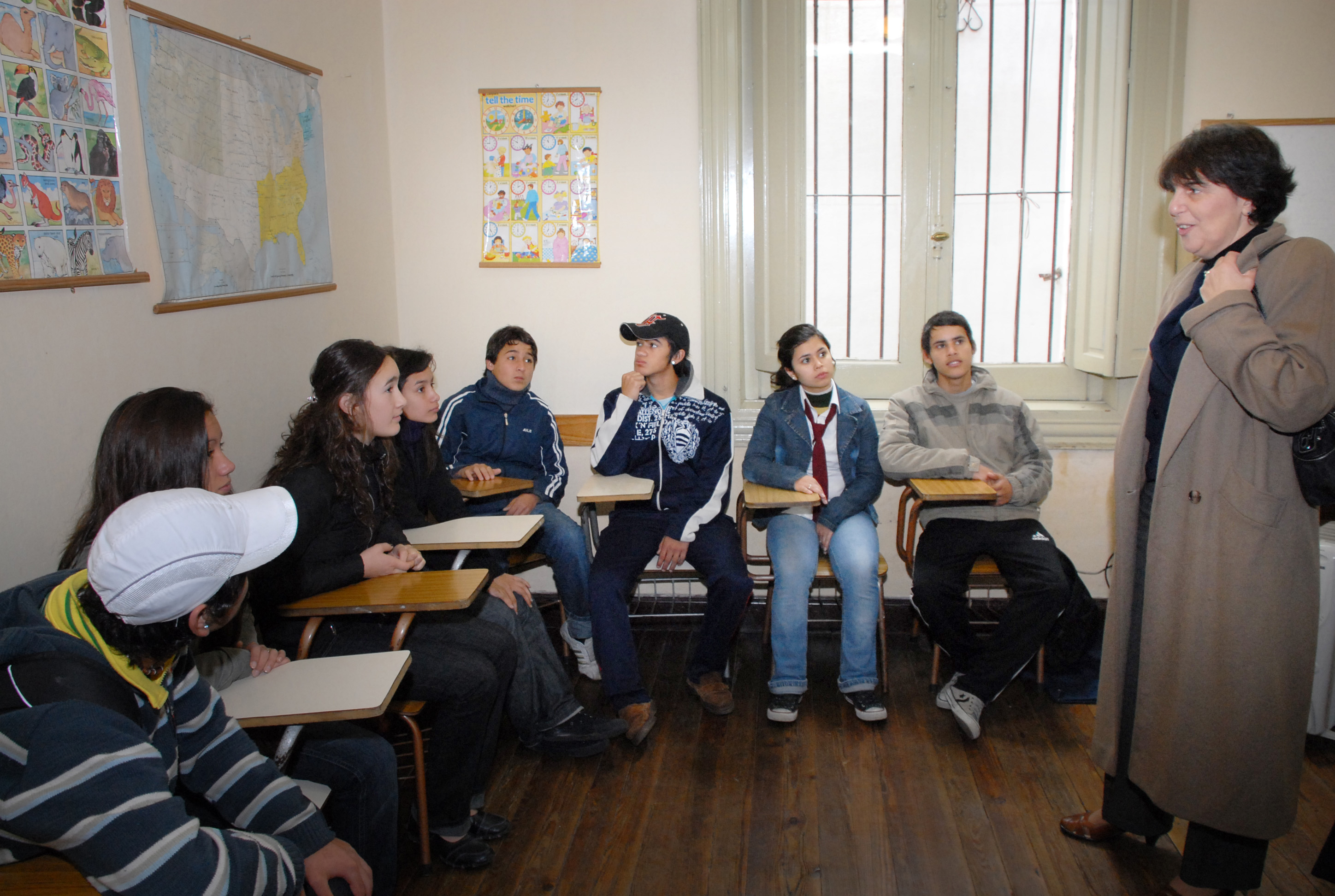
The Chargé d'affaires of the U.S. Embassy in Montevideo speaks to a group of ACCESS scholarship students at the Alianza Binational Center in Melo, Uruguay in 2009.

Binational Centers are privately founded English-language educational institutes, generally located in Latin America. The oldest of these, the Instituto Cultural Argentino-Norteamericano in Buenos Aires was founded October 17, 1927 by Cupertino del Campo, then the president of the Rotary Club of Buenos Aires. Further centers were established across Argentina including Córdoba, Mendoza, Rosario, Tucumán, Salta, and Santiago del Estero. As of 2016, there are more than a hundred of these centers in the Western Hemisphere which the U.S. Government considers "major hubs for English language learning and cross-cultural dialogue". Binational Centers were spread across many countries; in 1974 there were such centers in Freiberg, Heidelberg, Nuremberg, Saarbrücken, Tübingen.

On March 11, 1990 an un-detonated bomb was discovered at the Binational Center at Chillán. On May 15, 1990 a Molotov cocktail was used against this same location. On May 24, 1990 an explosive damaged the Binational Center in Talca. The Túpac Amaru Revolutionary Movement attacked American Spaces twice, in the first attack on July 18, 1990, perhaps 600-800 grams of dynamite was detonated at the Binational Center in Cuzco, Peru wounding four Peruvian students. On August 8, 1990 they bombed the Binational Center in Trujillo, Peru. As of 2013, there were 112 operating centers across 19 countries. Although the Binational Centers program does not provide operational funding, it does pay academic specialists to teach English. The Binational Centers' provision of English-language lessons as a method of cultural diplomacy has been compared the Confucius Institutes' similar method with Mandarin. As of 2009, these centers became self-supporting based upon the tuition they collect. With the contraction of U.S. engagement, many locals are unaware these centers had any link to U.S. diplomacy.

=== Benjamin Franklin Library ===
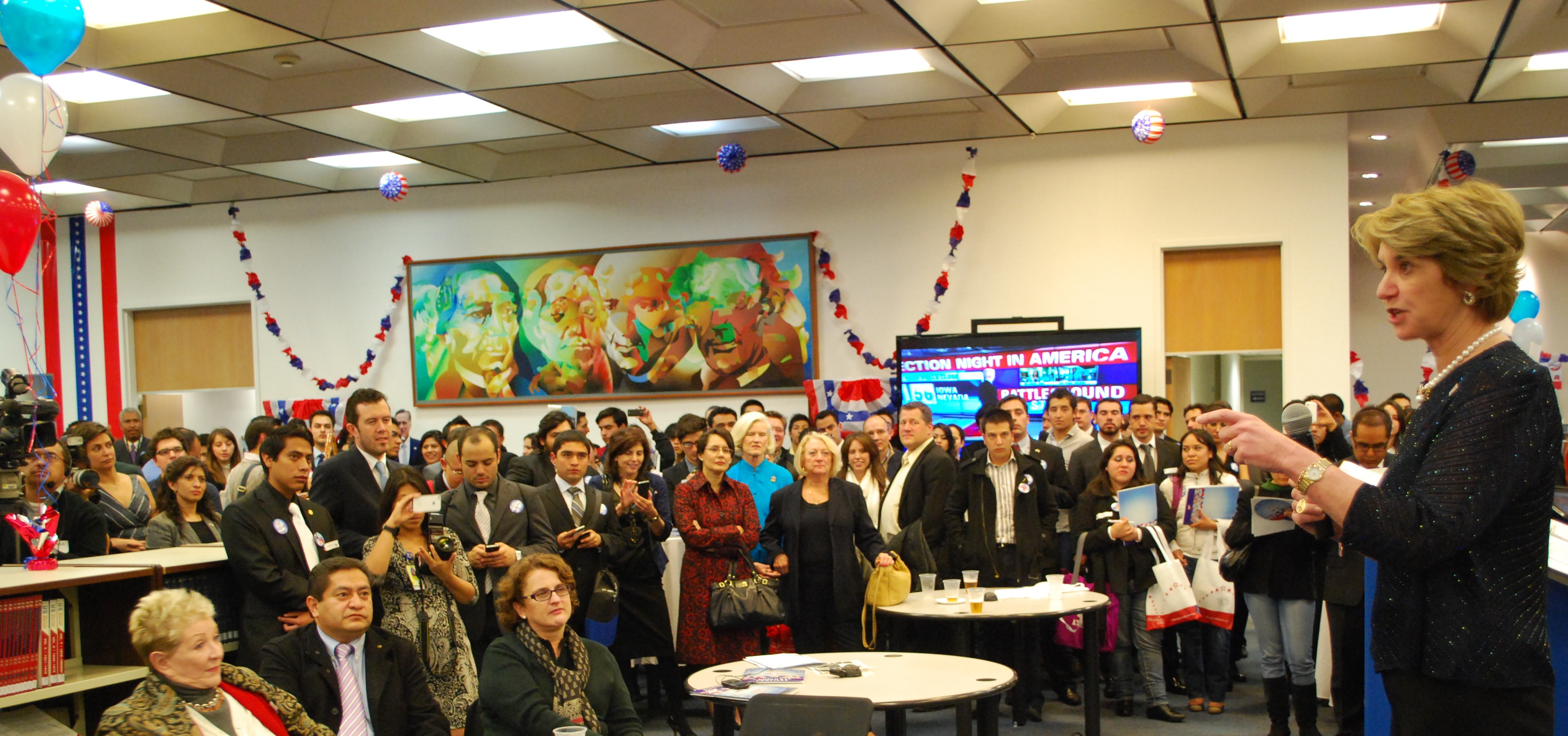
This event at the Benjamin Franklin Library on the evening of the 2012 United States elections and hosted by the U.S. Embassy in Mexico City celebrated democracy and education. Kathleen Kennedy Townsend, former Maryland Lieutenant Governor and Special Advisor for "100,000 Strong in the Americas," speaks to undergraduate students and professors representing 21 local colleges and universities.

The first American Center, the Benjamin Franklin Library in Mexico City, was the brain child of Carl H. Milam, then president of American Library Association (ALA), out of concern for the lack of both professional librarians and standardized book filing systems in Mexico. The price of books from private booksellers in Mexico remained out of reach for most and free lending libraries were rare. Milam's plan to build an American library in Mexico, modeled on the American Library in Paris, stalled for years until the 1936 signing of the Buenos Aires Convention, which encouraged Pan-American links between educational institutions. The Convention spurred the Department of State's creation of a general advisory committee within their Division of Cultural Relations (the forerunner to the Bureau of Educational and Cultural Affairs). Milam joined the committee alongside James T. Shotwell of the Carnegie Endowment for International Peace, an early ally of the ALA's Pan-American educational outreach plans, framing libraries in Mexico as a good-faith gesture. Also on the committee were Stephen P. Duggan (co-founder of the Institute of International Education), archivist and Carnegie alum Waldo Gifford Leland, and U.S. Commissioner of Education John Ward Studebaker.

A grant from the Rockefeller Foundation allowed the ALA to survey library holdings across Latin America with an eye to building a library in Mexico City. The plan involved a commitment from the Mexican government for the construction of the building, originally two separate libraries (later pared down to two reading rooms in a single library) with the funding for books from private sources. As tensions rose in the lead up to World War II, the idea of creating U.S.-style libraries in Latin America aligned well with the U.S. Good Neighbor policy. Nelson Rockefeller, then leading Franklin D. Roosevelt's Office of the Coordinator of Inter-American Affairs (OIAA), saw the ALA's library plan his foundation had funded as a way to show concrete U.S. support to Mexico as a library would serve as a platform for American information programs to retain access to Latin American raw materials markets. The OIAA took over the funding originally offered by the Mexican government. Rockefeller saw the library envisioned for Mexico City as the first of many to be built in Latin America to fill the gap left by the flagging Alliance française. A contract between OIAA and ALA was signed in August 1941, purchasing a residence at Paseo de la Reforma 34. The library opened in April 1942. At the opening ceremony, the President of Mexico, Manuel Ávila Camacho gave remarks welcoming the library as an "embassy of ideas" restraining the "present day imperialisms."

From the start the library proved very popular despite the fact that the library's initial collection of around 6,000 books were entirely in English. This success caused the OIAA to accelerate plans for further libraries in the region. The Biblioteca Americana de Nicaragua in Managua opened in October 1942 and the Biblioteca Artigas-Washington opened in Montevideo in 1943. The contract between the Department of State and the ALA for these three libraries was terminated at the end of 1946, handing sole control of the libraries to the U.S. Government. Three more branches of the Ben Franklin library were established in Monterrey, Guadalajara, and Puebla. In 1962, at the height of the Cuban Missile Crisis, the Guadalajara branch library was set on fire during a student demonstration.

== Cold War America Houses and American Centers ==
American Centers are overseas U.S.-owned or -leased facilities that are apart from the local U.S. chancery or consulate and publicly accessible. The centers are staffed by employees or the embassy or contracted staff supervised by U.S. diplomats. Following the end of World War II, American Centers were established in Allied-occupied areas of Germany, Austria, and Japan.

=== America Houses ===
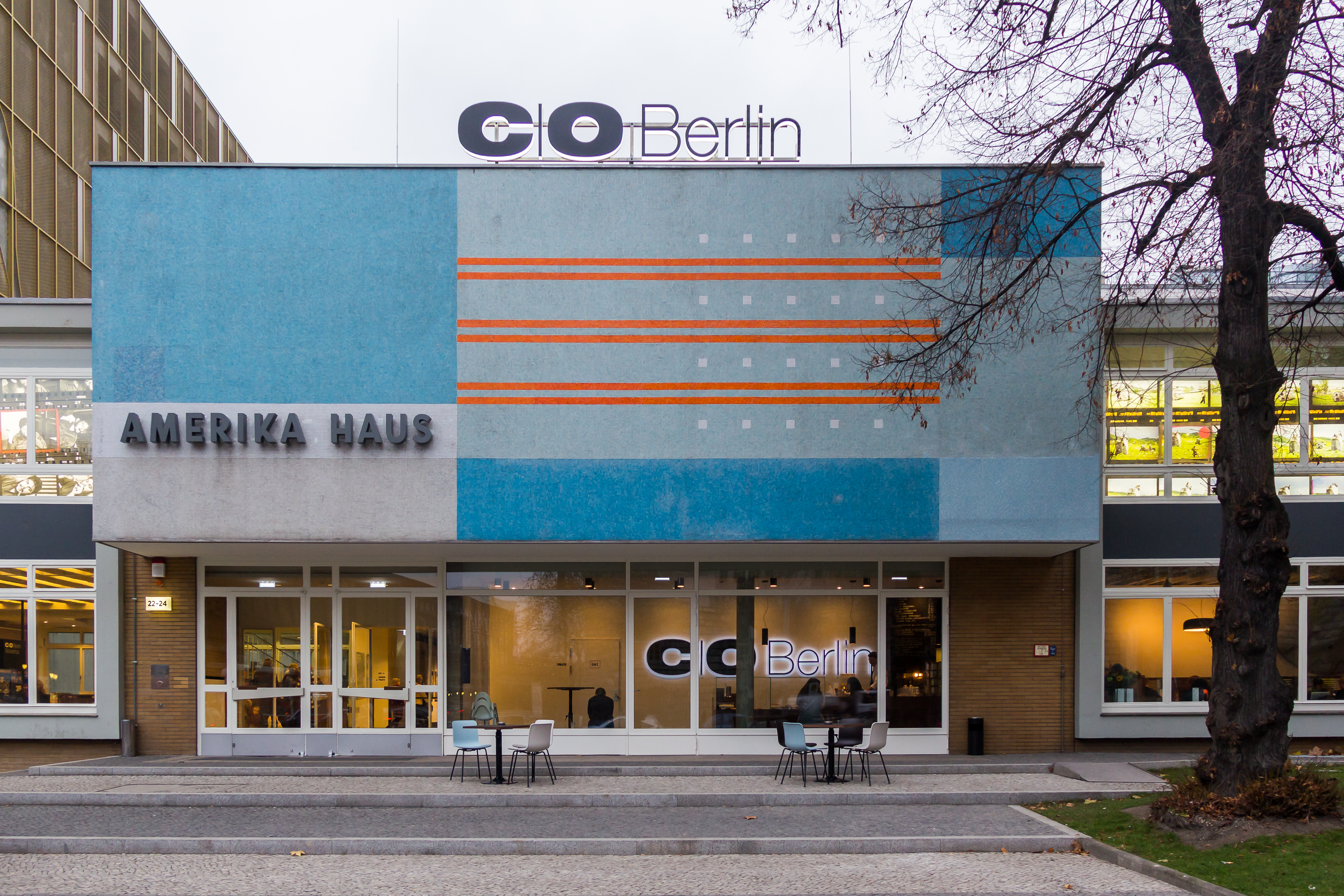
America House in Berlin

In Germany, the U.S. Occupation forces created the first of the postwar America Houses (called Amerikahäuser in German). The purpose of these Amerikahäuser was "to further the democratic reorientation of Germany, and to foster the assimilation of the German people into the society of peaceful nations. . ." with which the libraries would assist. With the official establishment of West Germany concurrent with the end of occupation in 1949, U.S. Forces had created 28 Amerikahäuser as well as 136 associated reading rooms and bookmobiles, usually co-located with U.S. military installations in Germany. Survey data in the late 1940s indicated that these centers reached urban professional men rather than the majority of the population which lived in smaller towns and rural areas.

During the immediate postwar reconstruction of Germany, the Amerikahäuser as well as their British and French analogues served as important incubators of the German art scene as many art houses had been looted and reduced to rubble during the war. By 1974, there were Amerikahäuser in Cologne, Düsseldorf, Frankfurt, Hanover, Hamburg, Munich, Stuttgart under the United States Information Service as well as several in West Berlin. The Amerika Haus Berlin was a symbol of outreach to the German people, much as the British Council and Maison de France were doing in their sectors. During the social foment of the 1960s, several America Houses in Germany were attacked and disrupted by left-wing student protesters. A Government Accountability Office in the 1990s recommended closing some America Houses worldwide to cut costs and shifting the public diplomacy effort to extant Binational Centers. With the disestablishment of the United States Information Agency in 1999, the Amerikahäuser were tuned over to local German control from which since 2014 they receive a majority of their funding. One author suggests that, over time, these houses and the Binational Centers that replaced them became as much a conduit for Germany to influence the U.S. as they were ways for the U.S. to influence Germany.

=== American Centers ===
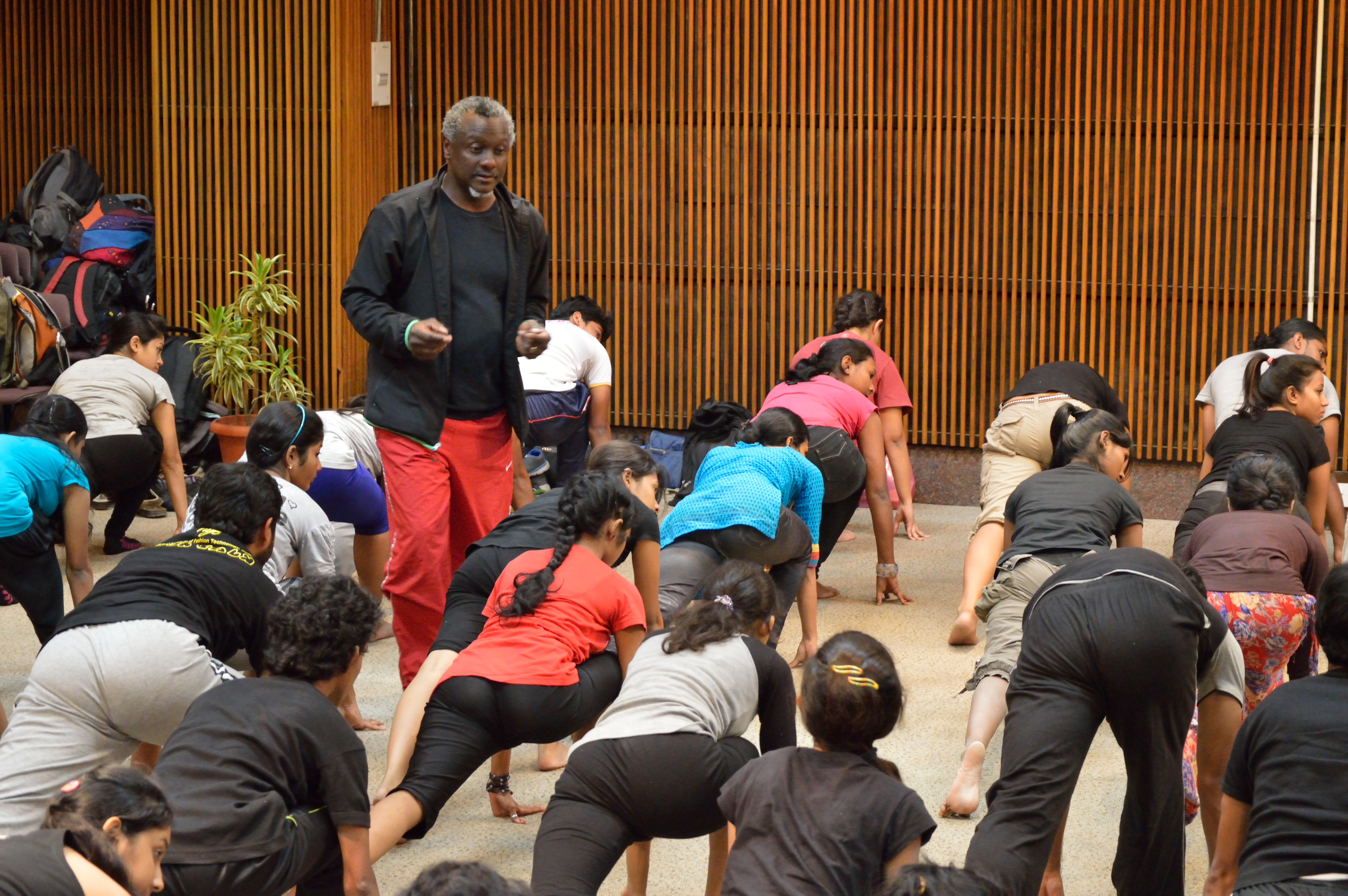
At the American Center in Kolkata, Robert Moses, American choreographer of the Robert Moses' Kin dance company conducts a workshop immediately after the press conference for Kolkata artists entitled Dancing to Connect.

In and after the latter half of the 20th century, American Centers often located in the center of foreign capital cities have been the primary tool of U.S. public diplomacy officers. Located outside of the American embassy, American Centers were established within facilities owned and operated by the U.S. Government. These centers are staffed by U.S. foreign service officers and librarians trained to provide reference material to the library visitors, as well as some local hires familiar with the United States. The centers are also used to host film screenings and lectures, as well as provide counseling for prospective exchange students. American Centers, with their trained public diplomats and services offered, are often the only American contact local nationals would make as a neutral-space away from the embassy was a more-inviting place to visit.

The American Center in Tokyo, for example, said that it "hosts lectures, film screenings and other events on topics of importance to the U.S.-Japan relationship." However, those familiar with the post have criticized its focus on operating as the embassy's "propaganda shop" by featuring lectures by speakers friendly to U.S. interests at the expense of cultural events that had been more popular with the Japanese visitors. In 2009, the Senate Foreign Relations Committee asserted that the uncensored nature of these centers' book collections, often containing serious literature and research material, often led locals "in countries either too poor or too repressive" to enjoy access to such vast information to call them American libraries because such access was emblematic of American wealth and openness. In early 1953, Joseph McCarthy complained about the presence of books in the American Spaces written by avowed communists, such as a paperback written by Dashiell Hammett found in a U.S. library in France. Based upon the testimony of Freda Utley, Harvey Matusow, and Louis Budenz, McCarthy sent associates Roy Cohn and G. David Schine to Europe to investigate the library holdings, embarrassing U.S. Ambassadors across the continent. Librarians were required to enforce a vague blacklist of authors including Hammett, Ilya Ehrenburg, Howard Fast, Langston Hughes, Anna Lee Jacoby, Jean-Paul Sartre, Edgar Snow, Theodore White, and many others. The removal of books from shelves by librarians was noted in 1953 by The New York Times, which commented that the growing list of banned books grew and without reasonable oversight. The libraries of these American Centers proved to be a draw with Arab audiences, specifically professionals and students. The foot traffic for English-language instruction and student counseling would also feed the audience for lectures and film screenings.

==== James Baldwin Library ====
Another American center, the James Baldwin Library in Yangon, Myanmar, has proved popular with the locals despite heavy government surveillance. George Packer, writing for The New Yorker in 2008, said that the Baldwin Library featured 13,000 books and periodicals and boasted a membership of 22,000 Burmese. The center, allowing for open political speech in a country under dictatorial rule, served as a meeting place for member of the 88 Generation Students Group and the National League for Democracy, as well as Burmese students, business-people, and ethnic minorities. Members are able to read books and DVDs banned by the Burmese government. The center's internet access has also been used to contribute to the Burmese-language Wikipedia. Burmese government-run news outlets have denounced the center's English for Journalism classes as propaganda designed to harm "young Myanmar brains" and ultimately "poison, because the course is nothing but sugar-coated bitter medicine." As of 2008, the Center in Yangon, formerly the North Korean embassy to Myanmar, was one of the few American Centers not yet affected by the Secure Embassy Construction and Counterterrorism Act of 1999. Credited to Public Affairs Officer Todd Pierce, the Center in Yangon has focused on openness and customer service to undercut the restrictiveness of the Burmese government.

==== @america ====
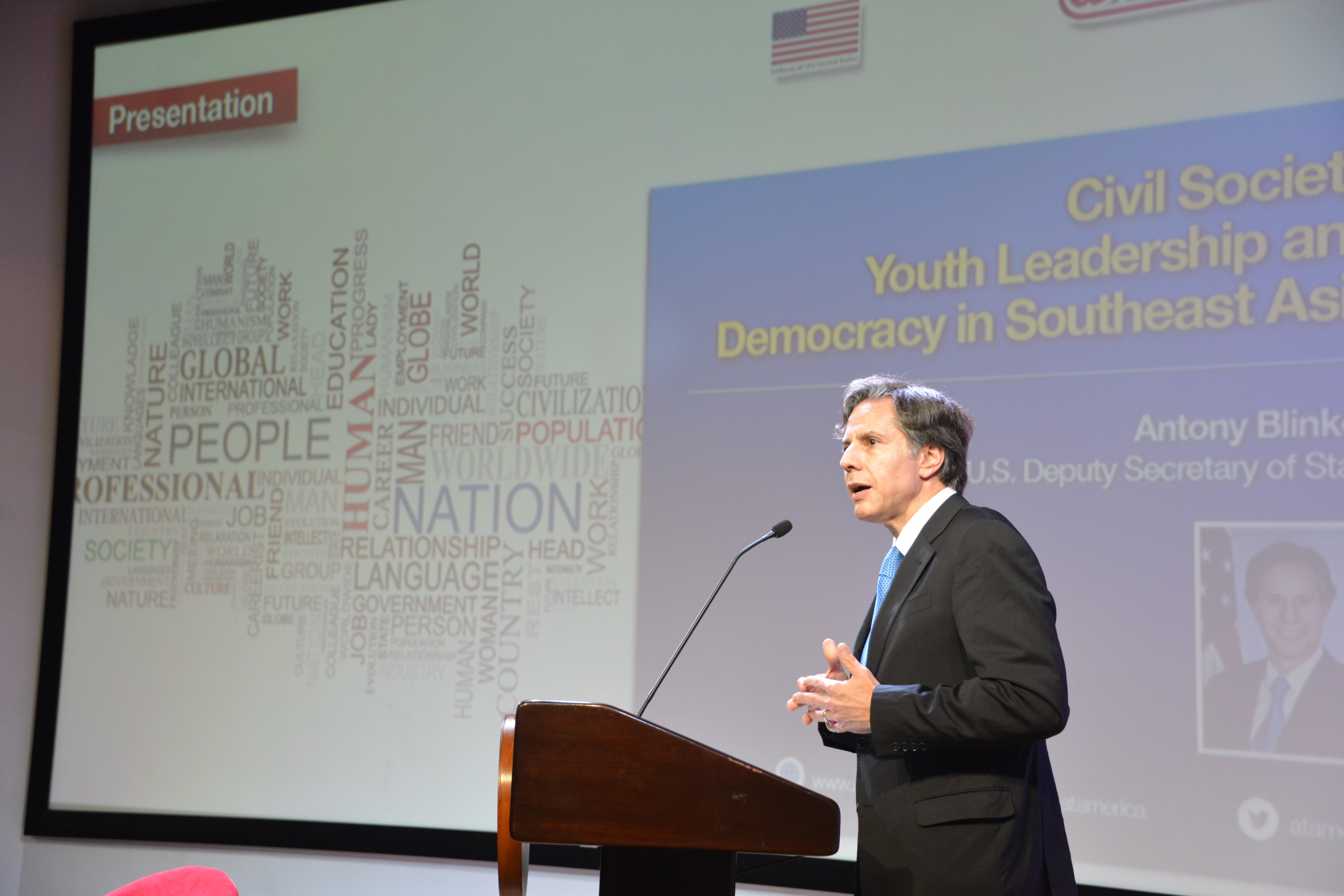
Deputy Secretary of State Antony Blinken talks about Civil Society, Youth Leadership and Democracy in Southeast Asia at @america cultural enter in Jakarta.

In December 2010, an American center in Jakarta opened called "@america" to provide a larger, but more secure, space for public diplomacy beyond the embassy compound. Housed on an upper-level of Pacific Place Jakarta mall, the facility is staffed by young bi-cultural and bilingual Indonesians under the direction of the State Department. With the guidance of focus groups of Indonesian youth, the center leverages technology provided through partnerships with Microsoft and Google to inform and entertain the customers, as evidenced by Judith McHale's comments at the opening ceremony. Unlike the rest of the mall, the storefront of @america has been described as "pretty forbidding." Heavy security including baggage checks separate the general public in Indonesia, the world's most-populous Muslim country, from the center. Open from the afternoon into the evening, the space's walls are covered with flat-screen TVs playing numerous programs and the center features free Wi-Fi. It also provides traditional services like student counseling, guest lectures, and other cultural attractions.

In the first six months of operation, the public affairs officer reported almost 44,000 visitors. The project also maintains a social media presence including Twitter and Facebook. Cameron R. Hume, the U.S. Ambassador to Indonesia at the time, was on hand for the opening. Dino Patti Djalal described the space as "hip, modern and open – a place where young people want to hang out." The use of communications technology, especially the U.S. provision overseas of connectivity to social media, has been described as reflective of a post-9/11 push to spur audience engagement in foreign lands in pursuit of U.S. public diplomacy objectives. The success of @america is credited with the 2011 revamp of American Spaces with a focus on exhibiting American technology and culture, although @america has been criticized for posting high visit numbers without visible public diplomacy achievements.

== Post–Cold War draw-downs ==
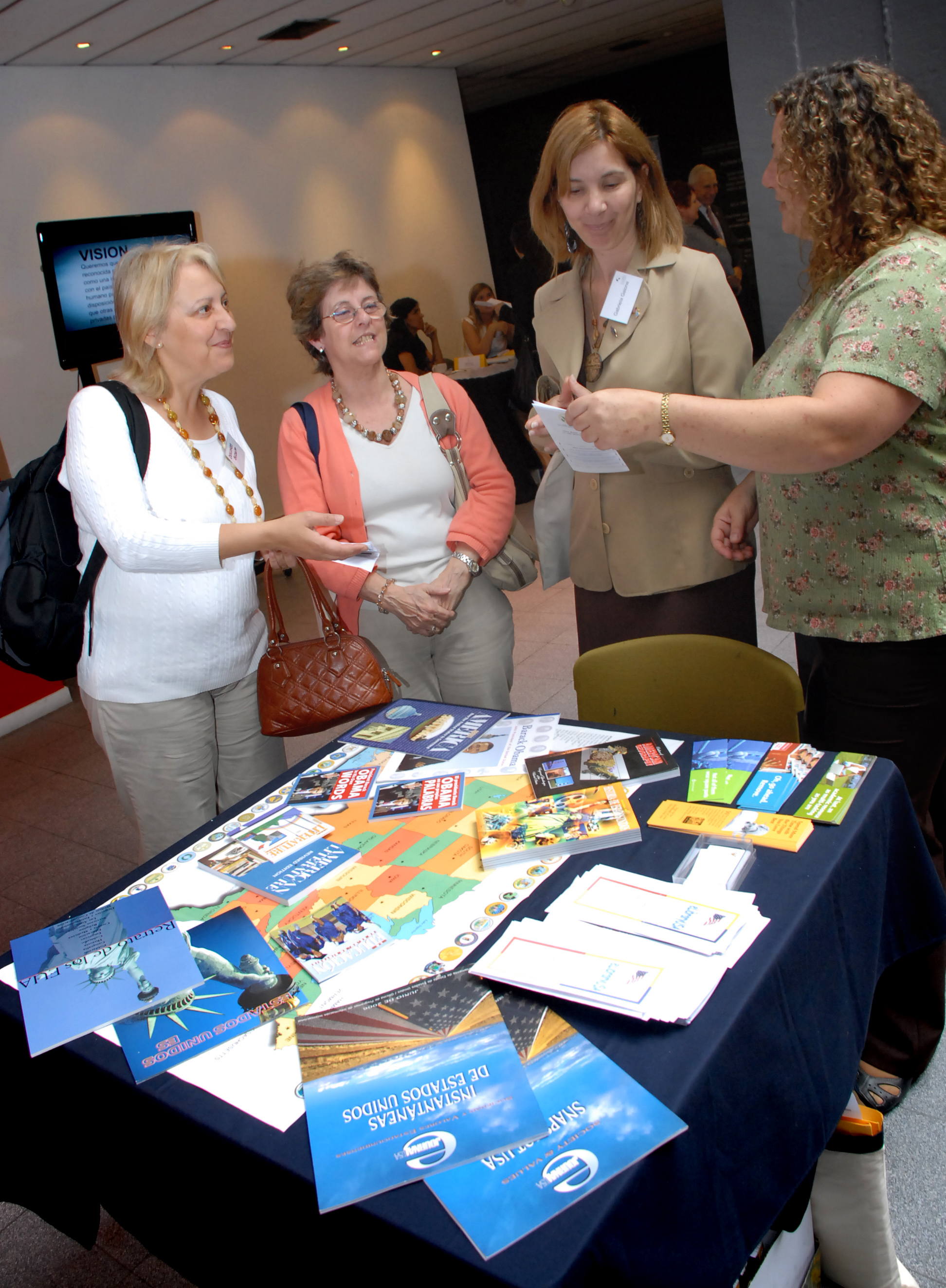
The Information Resource Center at the US Embassy in Montevideo distributes brochures and information about education opportunities in the United States during the 1st Alumni Uruguay Conference, November 17–18, 2011.

Following the end of the Cold War, proclamations about the assumed end of history and an anticipated peace dividend precipitated the absorption of the USIA back into the Department of State in 1999 and, coupled with the rise of the internet, the American Centers program headed towards closure. One State Department official told an advisory group: "I have never served in a country where people have not said 'you blew it when you closed the cultural centers and libraries.' They tell me, 'no wonder my kids don't know the truth about the United States.'" In the wake of the 1998 United States embassy bombings, the Secure Embassy Construction and Counterterrorism Act of 1999 (SECCA) placed additional restrictions upon the physical security of US installations abroad such as standoff distance to prevent vulnerability to the car bomb tactics responsible for those 1998 attacks. Presaged by the Inman Report a decade earlier, the law forced the closure of hundreds of US cultural centers that had been located in easily-accessible downtown real estate.

The security requirements resulted in these functions being moved into fortified remote outposts thereby killing their public diplomacy value. For example, the refitting of the embassy in Berlin was criticized for having an unwelcoming appearance, countering the outreach effort for which the State Department is responsible. Roger Boyes of The Times opined that the fortified design seemed "planned for another, more unsettled part of the world." One Pakistani surveyed compared a visit to the American Center under these increased security conditions "like going to jail or getting into Fort Knox."

Following the implementation of SECCA, some public diplomatic activity was forced into Information Resource Centers (IRCs) within the fortified embassies. Restrictions against public access proved to be cost-prohibitive and American Corners were developed to carry forward the American public diplomacy mission. In 2009, Richard Lugar, former chairman of the United States Senate Committee on Foreign Relations, issued a report written by staffer Paul Foldi with recommendations to revamp the U.S. public diplomacy programs. One recommendation directed the relocation of public diplomacy activities within embassies to secure external sites more easily-accessible to the public. The report also recommended a reclamation of the Bi-national Centers originally founded by the State Department but since delegated to host nation entities which are, as of 2009, positioned to compete with U.S. Government efforts to influence the local populace. This served as the impetus for the 'American Spaces' umbrella concept.

Writing for The Hill, Lynne Weil summarized a 2015 report from the U.S. Advisory Commission on Public Diplomacy, who is responsible for oversight of U.S. public diplomacy programs. She concluded that efforts like American Spaces are hampered by security and funding challenges despite the fact that the content they provide overseas including uncensored access to the internet is "valuable, especially in countries that restrict access to information." As of 2016, the program claimed 700 spaces across 169 countries. The inaccessibility of these spaces due to security has decreased foot traffic to them, hampering their outreach effort. In January 2016, the United States took diplomatic action against what it described as "widespread harassment" of American personnel in Russia which had forced the closure of 28 American Spaces throughout Russia.

=== American Corners ===
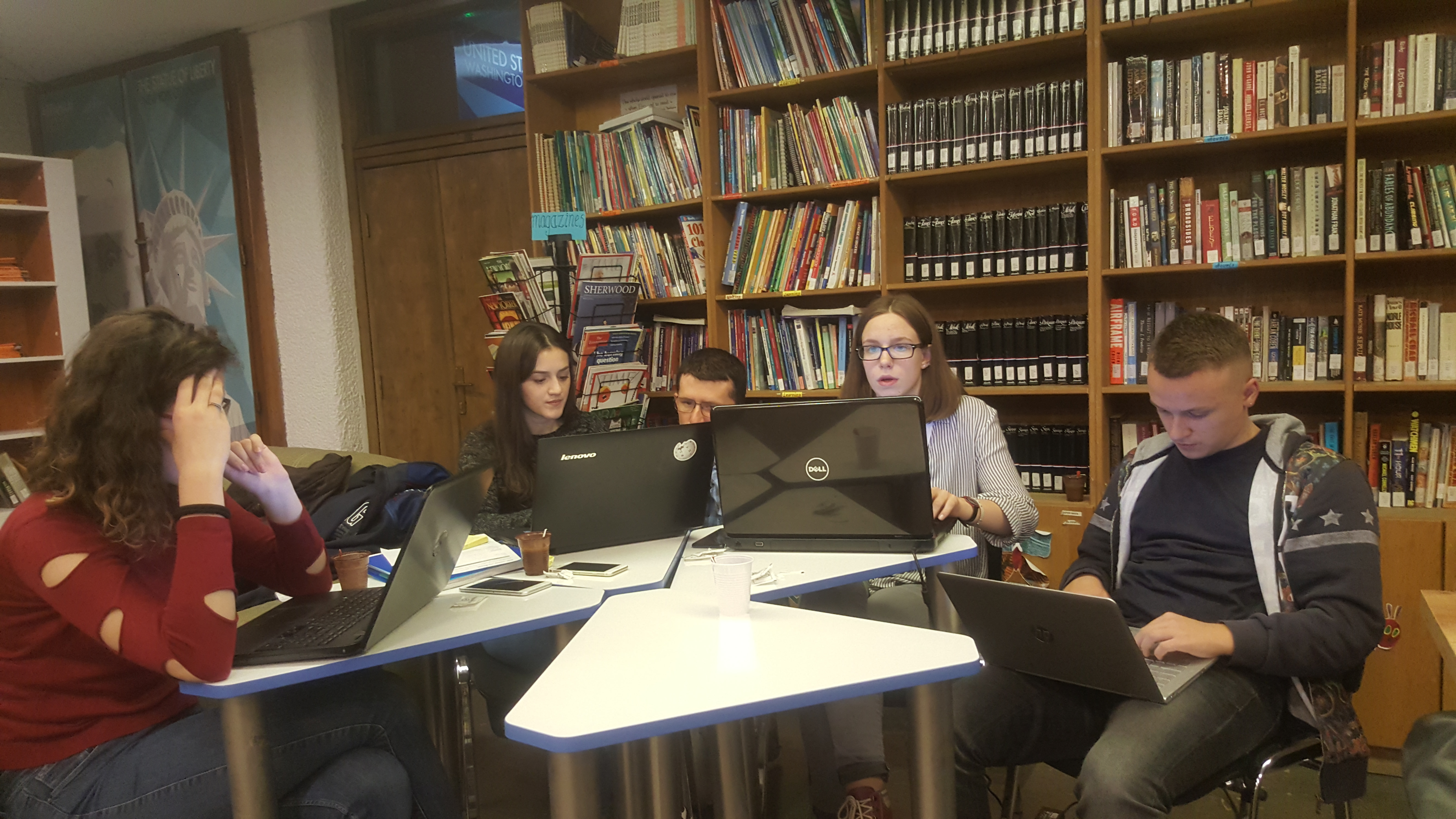
A Wikipedia edit-a-thon at the American Corner in the National Library of Kosovo.

American Corners are areas within existing libraries or other institutions to provide information to the target populace located far from U.S. embassies. At a start-up cost of US$35,000 the local U.S. embassy furnishes a space in a local library with several hundred books as well as six computers with internet access. While the U.S. government provides the books and other materials, they are not staffed by Americans. The concept proliferated across Eastern Europe and Central Asia in the early 21st century. In 2008, American Corners across Belarus (Babrujsk, Brest, Homel, Hrodna, Mahilyou, Malazhechna, Minsk, Pinsk, Polatsk and Vitsebsk) were closed without explanation. As of February 2009, there were 414 such corners in existence. A 2017 doctoral thesis posited a utilization analysis showing a cost-savings in American Corners, paired with a native institution and more-accessible to the general public than the spaces within heavily fortified embassies, indicating the former as more economical than the latter. In 2002, then–Under Secretary of State for Public Diplomacy and Public Affairs Charlotte Beers proposed, in cooperation with the Smithsonian Institution, a program of "American Rooms" located within universities and other venues in the Middle East aimed at young adults to virtually display true American life as opposed to the fiction found on TV shows and movies. In December 2016, one such room was opened at the University of Sarajevo providing students there an opportunity to observe U.S. public corruption trials.

=== Information Resource Centers ===
Excepting the American Corners and the preexisting Binational Centers, SECCA forced much public diplomacy work into Information Resource Centers (IRCs), most of which were located within the U.S. Embassy and half available by appointment only. Local nationals interested in U.S. programs had to pass through security screening at the embassy to reach the IRC and temporarily surrender their smartphones and other electronic devices which would have been used with online access. With decreased accessibility, foot traffic to the IRCs dwindled and the local demand for English-language instruction which used to be a key factor in public diplomacy was picked up by the British Councils. IRCs provide EducationUSA advising and serve as an administrative link between the U.S. embassy and any other American Spaces in the region. In 2013, there were a total of 853 American Spaces (including all varieties herein described). In May 2015, the State Department warned only 17 percent of the then-715 American Spaces were within U.S. installations, placing the others at risk of closure due to security concerns. In particular, they posited that American Centers open and available to the public accomplished far more outreach than the Information Resource Centers cloistered within U.S. embassies, which were only one-sixth as popular. Usage rates regarding American Centers which converted to IRCs dropped in many locales by 50 to 90 percent.
