= Blue State Digital =

Washington, D.C.-based Internet strategy and technology firm

- Type: Subsidiary
- Industry: Consulting
- Founded: 2004
- Founders: Jascha Franklin-Hodge; Clay Johnson; Joe Rospars; Ben Self; Thomas Gensemer
- Headquarters: New York, NY, United States; Washington, D.C., United States
- Key people: Joe Rospars, founding partner and Chief Executive Officer
- Parent: WPP
- Website: www.bluestate.co

Blue State Digital is an advertising company that specializes in online fundraising, and campaign consultancy. The company was founded by 4 former staffers of the Howard Dean 2004 presidential campaign. The company became notable after providing digital strategy and technology services for the 2008 and 2012 Barack Obama presidential campaigns.

Blue State Digital has offices in New York City, Washington, D.C., Boston, San Francisco, Chicago and London, and in December 2010, Blue State Digital was acquired by WPP plc.

== History ==
Howard Dean's 2004 presidential campaign pioneered new applications of new media to engage voters and raise campaign funds. In 2004, four former Dean staffers—Jascha Franklin-Hodge (CIO), Clay Johnson, Joe Rospars (CEO), and Ben Self—founded Blue State Digital to provide campaign technology (voter database, fundraising technology, and campaign recruitment) and strategic services. In July 2014, Jascha Franklin-Hodge (CTO) left to become the CIO for the City of Boston.

In 2005, Thomas Gensemer from America Coming Together (a Democratic-allied advocacy organization) became the managing partner. Their earliest clients included Ted Kennedy's Senate campaign, the Communications Workers of America, the Democratic National Committee (chaired by Howard Dean), Harry Reid, and AT&T.

In 2007, the company was recruited in the early phases of the Barack Obama'2008 US Presidential campaign to provide technology services, and for Rospar to create and lead the internal new media strategy team. These technology services included web hosting, an online fundraising product called BSD tools, and a custom social networking platform. Over the course of the campaign, more than $500 million was raised, millions of volunteers were mobilised, and an online database of 13 million supporters was created, This was reported in the media as being, in large part, due to their platform, and services.

After their work in the successful Obama Campaign, the company opened offices in New York, Los Angeles, and London. Their portfolio of clients now included American Red Cross, United Way, Carnegie Hall, and Vogue Magazine. By 2010, the company had offices in London. Washington, and Boston, and on December 30, 2010, they announced that they were to be wholly acquired by the multinational public relations company WPP Digital.

The European expansion of US Voter information companies (such a Nation builder, Change.org, and Blue State Digital) depended on the International Safe Harbor Privacy Principles. This agreement allowed the companies to avoid the complexity of Europe’s patchwork of privacy protections, and allow them to provide detailed voter information (from social media habits to voting records) to the U.K.'s Labour Party, French President Francois Hollande, and Swedish Social Democratic Party. In October 2015, this agreement was declared invalid by the European Court of Justice in October 2015. The result was "Uncertainty over whether the talks can succeed has U.S. political tech firms scrambling to find ways to keep doing business in Europe."

By 2019, the company had expanded into nonprofit fundraising, with United Kingdom clients United Nations Refugee Agency as well as Tommy's (charity) which raises funds for the St Thomas' Hospital in London .

In 2019, Blue State Digital was rebranded as Blue State, and BSD Tools was sold to Every Action. In September 2020, Brooklyn office started the process of forming a union with CODE-CWA in September 2020, at a time when less than 5% of WPP employees (its parent company) are unionized, with the majority of them in Europe.

== Notable alumni ==
- Tom Cochran – White House director of new media technologies
- Jascha Franklin-Hodge – founding partner, former chief information officer for city of Boston
- Leigh Heyman – former White House director of new media technologies
- Clay Johnson – founding partner
- Macon Phillips – first White House digital director
- Ben Self – founding partner, chairman Kentucky Democratic Party
