= The Information Diet =

2012 book by Clay Johnson

The Information Diet: A Case for Conscious Consumption
- Author: Clay Johnson
- Subject: Media consumption
- Publisher: O'Reilly Media
- Publication date: 2012
- Publication place: United States
- Pages: 160
- ISBN: 978-1449304683

The Information Diet: A Case for Conscious Consumption is a 2012 book on media consumption by Clay Johnson.

== Reception ==
Various commentators have reviewed the book. It has received generally good reviews.
