= Dries Buytaert =

Belgian software programmer (born 1978)

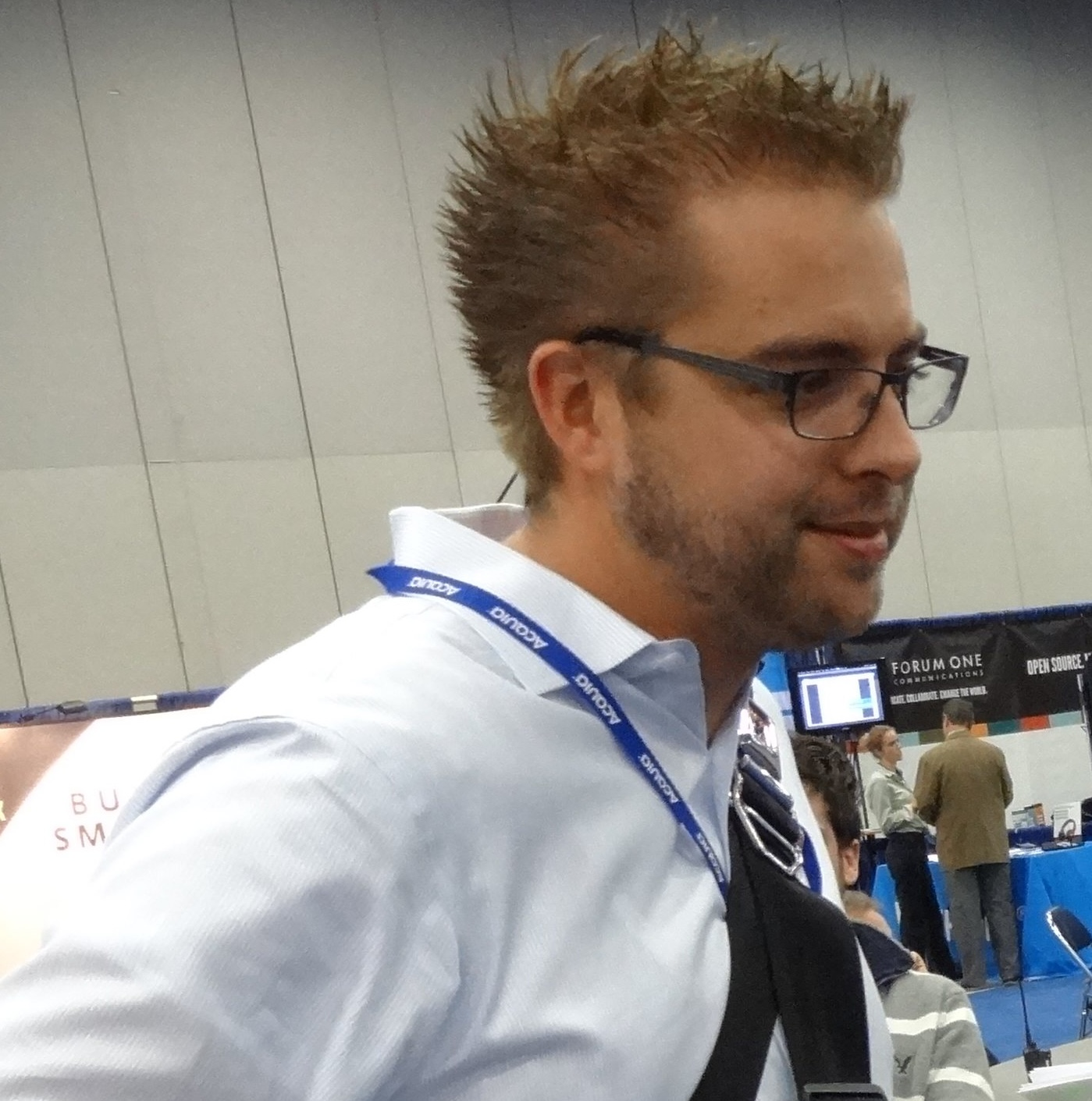
- Dries at DrupalCon talking to Drupal developers
- Born: 19 November 1978 (age 47); Wilrijk, Antwerp, Belgium
- Education: PhD dissertation in computer science
- Alma mater: Ghent University

Dries Buytaert (born 19 November 1978) is a Belgian open-source software programmer. He is the founder and lead developer of the Drupal content management system. He previously served as the CTO and CSO of Acquia, and currently serves as its Executive Chairman.

As a long-time advocate for the open web, Buytaert has emphasized the need to preserve the internet as a public good, warning against growing consolidation by proprietary platforms. In his leadership role, he has drawn attention to the “maker/taker” imbalance in the open-source ecosystem—where a small group of contributors (makers) build and maintain critical software used by a much larger group of organizations (takers) who benefit without giving back. He has called for greater institutional responsibility, particularly from governments and large corporations, to ensure the sustainability of open digital infrastructure.

== Career ==
Buytaert was born in Wilrijk, Antwerp, Belgium. He defended his PhD dissertation in computer science on 27 January 2008, at Ghent University in Belgium.

From 1999 to 2000 he was the maintainer of the Linux-WLAN FAQ.

On 1 December 2007, Dries announced, together with co-founder Jay Batson, the launch of a start-up called Acquia. Acquia is a commercial open-source software company providing products, services, and technical support for Drupal. Acquia tries to be to Drupal what Red Hat has been to Linux. In 2009, Acquia helped re-launch Whitehouse.gov on Drupal.

On 31 March 2008, Dries launched Mollom, a service dedicated to stopping website spam: "Mollom's purpose is to dramatically reduce the effort of keeping your site clean and the quality of your content high. Currently, Mollom is a spam-killing one-two punch combination of a state-of-the-art spam filter and CAPTCHA server." Over 59,000 websites were protected by the Mollom service, including all of Netlog's messages. Mollom support ended 2 April 2018.

In 2008, Buytaert was elected "Young Entrepreneurs of Tech" by BusinessWeek. He was also named to the MIT Technology Review TR35 as one of the top 35 innovators in the world under the age of 35.

=== Dismissal of Larry Garfield ===
In February of 2017, Buytaert privately asked developer Larry Garfield to leave the Drupal project, shortly after forum posts came to light that outed Garfield as a participant in the Gorean subculture. In a March 22 blog post, Garfield accused Buytaert of tolerating doxing and wrote that Drupal's Community Working Group had not found any Code of Conduct violations in his history. Buytaert made a post the next day which defended the decision as necessary for fostering an inclusive community. He also wrote that his precise reasoning was confidential and that he "did not make the decision based on the information or beliefs conveyed in Larry's blog post." Several commentators disputed this characterization citing Buytaert's deleted sentence "further participation in a leadership role implies our community is complicit with and/or endorses these views, which we do not." 85 Drupal developers posted an open letter criticizing Buytaert for his handling of the situation. On April 9, Buytaert apologized "for causing grief and uncertainty, especially to those in the BDSM and kink communities who felt targeted by the turmoil". On July 13, Buytaert and Drupal Association Executive Director Megan Sanicki issued statements providing additional information about the situation and clarified that while Garfield's technical leadership roles had been removed, he could continue to participate in the development of Drupal as an individual contributor.

== Personal life ==
Buytaert lives in Boston, USA.
