= Jesse Lee (politician) =

American politician (born 1979)

White House Director of Progressive Media & Online Response
- Incumbent
- Assumed office April 23, 2011
- President: Barack Obama

Personal details
- Born: 1979 (age 46–47)
- Party: Democratic
- Education: Trinity College

Jesse Lee (born 1979) was named the White House Director of Progressive Media & Online Response on May 23, 2011. This was a newly created position to help maintain Barack Obama’s online presence for his 2012 Presidential reelection bid. The duties of this position, dealing with negative or factually incorrect stories about the President, was formerly handled by the Democratic National Committee's rapid response team. Lee’s first tweet about his new position included a picture of The Terminator.

Lee was formerly the Online Programs Director under the Barack Obama Administration. Lee spent his early life in Takoma Park, Maryland, and graduated with a degree in philosophy from Trinity College in Hartford, Connecticut in 2002. He was hired to do Internet work for the Democratic Congressional Campaign Committee (DCCC) in 2003, and worked in their online division from 2004 to 2006.

Lee served as Senior New Media Advisor to Speaker of the United States House of Representatives Nancy Pelosi during the 110th United States Congress. During the 2008 United States presidential election, Lee performed online response for the Democratic National Committee. He worked in online outreach during the Presidential transition of Barack Obama, in the New Media department. On February 23, 2009, President Barack Obama announced Lee was hired as Online Programs Director for his administration.

== Early life and education ==
Lee was raised in Takoma Park, Maryland. In 2002, Lee graduated from Trinity College in Hartford, Connecticut. Lee graduated with an academic major in philosophy from Trinity College, and was also close to obtaining a major in politics from the college but was short one thesis. After college, Lee did temporary work as a paralegal.

== Political career ==
Lee was hired in 2003 to do Internet-related work for the Democratic Congressional Campaign Committee (DCCC). From 2004 to 2006, Lee worked for the online division of the DCCC. Rahm Emanuel became DCCC chair in 2005, and allowed Lee discretion in his online postings. Lee served as the Senior New Media Advisor to Speaker of the United States House of Representatives Nancy Pelosi during the 110th United States Congress. Lee blogged for Pelosi on the Speaker's official blog called "The Gavel". During the 2008 United States presidential election, Lee performed online rapid response for the Democratic National Committee. Lee worked in the Presidential transition of Barack Obama, in the New Media department, performing online outreach during the transition and work on the website Change.gov. The Washington Post noted "Lee is well respected in the blogosphere". Greg Sargent, a blogger with The Washington Post partner WhoRunsGov.com, wrote positively of Obama's choice of Lee for his transition team. "Lee, meanwhile, is highly regarded by liberal bloggers. He wrote the first-ever blog for the House Speaker, and in the closing days of the campaign he did online rapid response for the DNC, helping the Obama camp frame its message outreach to the blogosphere," wrote Sargent on Talking Points Memo.

On February 23, 2004, President Barack Obama announced Lee was hired as Online Programs Director for his administration, in a release from the White House Press Secretary of "key White House staff". Part of Lee's duties as White House Online Programs Director include running Whitehouse.gov, and innovating techniques to engage individuals on the Internet. Lee came up with a program called "Open for Ideas", and this led to a town hall meeting in March 2009 where President Obama answered questions that had been submitted online. "I think the online town hall is the coolest thing I've seen come to fruition. I'd like to get to the point where that kind of stuff replaces the comment forums you typically find on government websites," said Lee to the National Journal. In September 2009, Lee posted to the White House blog defending the Obama Administration against criticism from conservative political commentator, Glenn Beck. Lee criticized Beck for what he asserted to be factual inaccuracies, and recommended the Pulitzer Prize-winning website PolitiFact.com for further information about "Fox lies ... repeated by Glenn Beck and others on the network". Jim Kuhnhenn of the Associated Press wrote that "calling a news networks' assertions 'lies' is unusually confrontational".

== Personal life ==
Lee has been married to Nita Chaudhary, former campaign director at MoveOn.Org and co-founder of UltraViolet, a community to fight sexism and to expand women's rights.

== See also ==
- Macon Phillips
- New media
- Presidency of Barack Obama
- Whitehouse.gov
