= Coordinator for International Information Programs =

U.S. government position

United States Coordinator for International Information Programs
- Seal of the United States Department of State
- Reports to: Under Secretary for Public Diplomacy and Public Affairs
- Nominator: President of the United States
- Abolished: May 28, 2019
- Succession: Assistant Secretary of State for Global Public Affairs
- Website: Official Website

The Coordinator for International Information Programs was the head of the Bureau of International Information Programs within the United States Department of State. The Coordinator for International Information Programs reported to the Under Secretary of State for Public Diplomacy and Public Affairs. As the head of the bureau, the Coordinator for International Information Programs had a rank equivalent to Assistant Secretary. On May 28, 2019, the Bureau of International Information Programs merged with the Bureau of Public Affairs into the Bureau of Global Public Affairs, and the duties of the position merged into the duties of the Assistant Secretary of State for Global Public Affairs.

== List of Coordinators for International Information Programs ==
| # | Name | Assumed office | Left office | President(s) served under |
|---|---|---|---|---|
| 1 | John Dwyer | January 11, 2000 | March 30, 2002 | George W. Bush |
| 2 | Stuart Holliday | May 13, 2002 | December 18, 2003 | George W. Bush |
| 3 | Alexander C. Feldman | June 14, 2004 | September 11, 2006 | George W. Bush |
| 4 | Jeremy Curtin | June 19, 2007 | December 2009 | George W. Bush, Barack Obama |
| 5 | Dawn McCall | July 27, 2010 | September, 2013 | Barack Obama |
| 6 | Macon Phillips | September 23, 2013 | January 20, 2017 | Barack Obama |
| - | Jonathan Henick | January 20, 2017 (acting) | May 28, 2019 | Donald Trump |
