= Drush =

Command-line shell interface for Drupal

- Original author: Arto Bendiken
- Developer: Moshe Weitzman
- Release: 2007; 19 years ago
- Stable release: 10.3.4
- Written in: PHP
- License: GPL
- Website: DRUSH Homepage
- Repository: github.com/drush-ops/drush

Drush (DRUpal SHell) is a computer software shell-based application used to control, manipulate, and administer Drupal websites.

== Details ==
Drush was originally developed by Arto Bendiken for Drupal 4.7. In May 2007, it was partly rewritten and redesigned for Drupal 5 by Franz Heinzmann. Drush is maintained by Moshe Weitzman with the support of Owen Barton, greg.1.anderson, jonhattan, Mark Sonnabaum, Jonathan Hedstrom and Christopher Gervais.
