= We the People (petitioning system) =

Online communications system for the White House

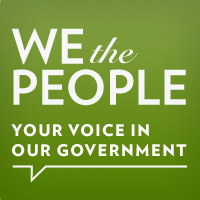
- Website logo in 2011

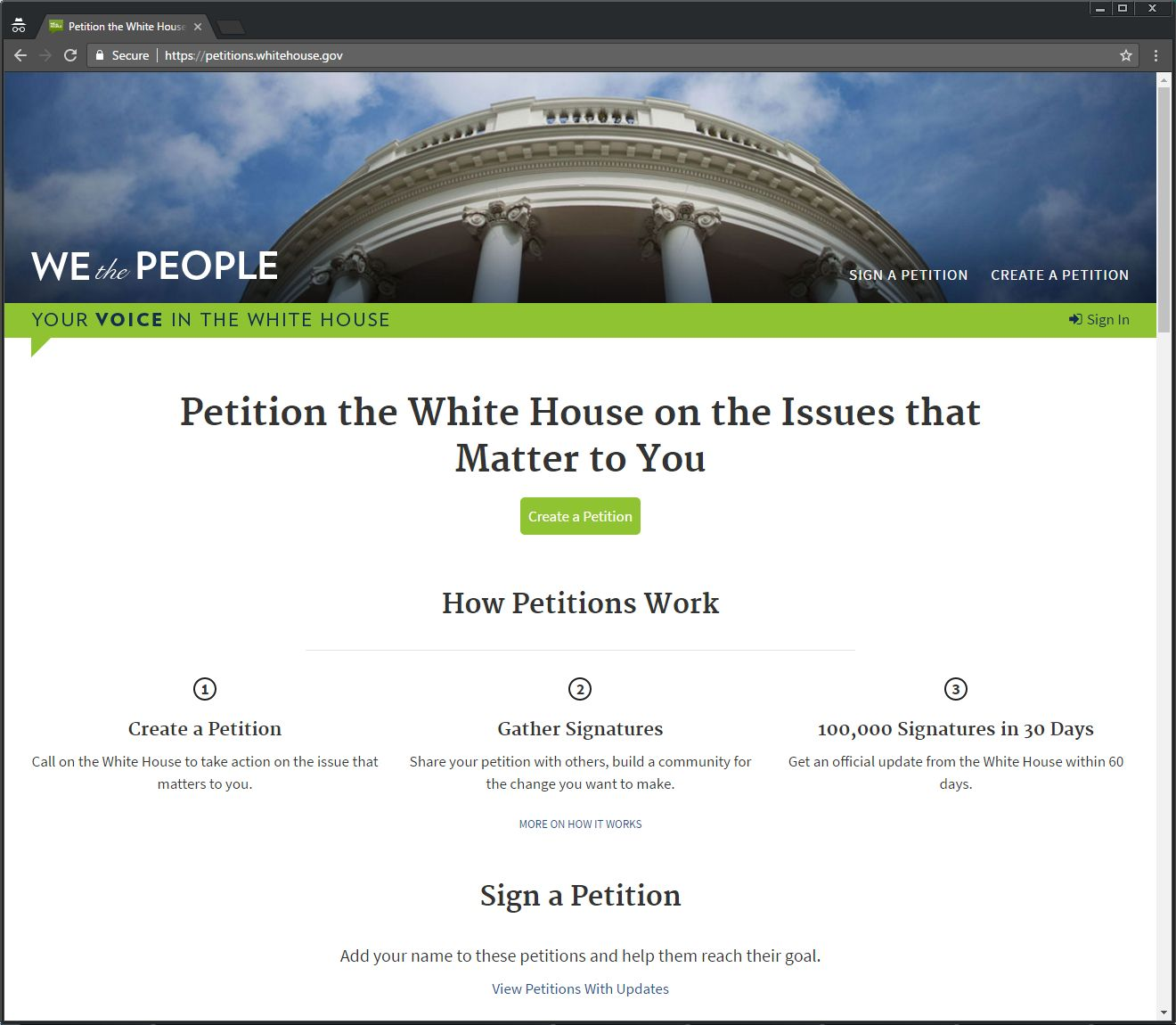
- Screenshot Screenshot of website homepage (2017)
- Website type: Government site
- Available in: English
- Dissolved: January 20, 2021
- Owner: United States government
- Creator: Obama administration
- Website: https://petitions.whitehouse.gov/about
- Commercial: No
- Registration: Required
- Launched: September 22, 2011; 15 years ago
- Content license: U.S. government content: Public domain User submissions: Creative Commons Attribution 3.0 Source code: Public domain or GPLv2
- Written in: Drupal 7

We the People, launched by the Obama administration on September 22, 2011, active until January 20, 2021, the day of the inauguration of Joe Biden, is a defunct section of the whitehouse.gov website used for petitioning the administration's policy experts. Petitions that reached a certain threshold of signatures were reviewed by Administration officials who in most instances would subsequently provide an official response. Legal proceedings in the United States were not subject to petitions, rather, the site served as a public relations mechanism for the presidential administration to provide a venue for citizens to express themselves. On August 23, 2012, the White House Director of Digital Strategy Macon Phillips released the source code for the platform. The source code is available on GitHub, and lists both public domain status as a work of the United States federal government and licensing under the GPL v2.

On December 19, 2017, the Trump administration announced its intention to temporarily shut down the website and replace it with a "new platform [that] would save taxpayers more than $1m a year", though ultimately it was retained in its initial form. On January 20, 2021, the day of the inauguration of Joe Biden, the website's address started redirecting to the main whitehouse.gov domain, marking the discontinuance of the feature by the incoming administration. It has not been relaunched since.

== Overview ==
The right "to petition the Government for a redress of grievances" is guaranteed by the United States Constitution's First Amendment. Users who wished to create a petition are required to register a free whitehouse.gov account. To sign a petition, users only need to provide their name and their email address, and they will receive an email with a link that they must click to confirm their signature. It is not necessary to have a whitehouse.gov account to sign a petition.

=== Thresholds ===
Under the Obama administration's rules, a petition had to reach 150 signatures (Dunbar's Number) within 30 days to be searchable on WhiteHouse.gov, according to Tom Cochran, former director of digital technology. It had to reach 100,000 signatures within 30 days to receive an official response. The original threshold was set at 5,000 signatures on September 1, 2011, was raised to 25,000 on October 3, 2011, and raised again to 100,000 as of January 15, 2013. The White House typically would not comment when a petition concerned an ongoing investigation.

"It's unclear whether Trump's advisors will make a tradition of publicly responding to petitions from the American people", Dell Cameron wrote for The Daily Dot on the day that Trump was inaugurated, noting that the Trump administration that same day "archived" (that is, deactivated) all petitions in progress on the 'We the People' site. New petitions were created, but only two petitions—both created on Inauguration Day—soared above the 100,000-signature threshold within the Trump administration's first week, while other petitions created subsequently seemed not to count signatures at all. The website was later fixed to count signatures but the Trump administration did not respond to any of the petitions until March 2018.

== Notable petitions ==
=== Death Star ===
In November 2012, a petition was created urging the government to create a Death Star as an economic stimulus and job creation measure gained more than 25,000 signatures, enough to qualify for an official response. The official (tongue-in-cheek) response released in January 2013 noted that the cost of building a real Death Star has been estimated at $852 quadrillion and that at current rates of steel production it would not be ready for more than 833,000 years. The response also noted that "the Administration does not support blowing up planets" and questions funding a weapon "with a fundamental flaw that can be exploited by a one-man starship" as reasons for denying the petition.

=== Sandy Hook Elementary School shooting ===
Following the Sandy Hook Elementary School shooting on December 14, 2012, a petition for new gun control measures achieved 100,000 signatures within 24 hours.

=== Cell phone unlocking bill ===
In February 2013, a petition started by OpenSignal co-founder and digital rights activist Sina Khanifar reached the 100,000-signature threshold required for a response from the White House. Two weeks later, the Obama administration issued a response urging the FCC and Congress to legalize cell phone unlocking. A year later, Congress passed the Unlocking Consumer Choice and Wireless Competition Act, the first piece of legislation driven by an online petition. The bill was signed into law by President Obama on August 1, 2014.

=== Prosecute 47 senators under the Logan Act ===
In March 2015, as the United States and the P5+1 group were negotiating with Iran on an agreement to restrain Iran's nuclear program, 47 Republican Senators sent an open letter to the leaders of Iran strongly suggesting that a future president or Congress could nullify any such agreement. This action was widely construed as deliberate interference with the negotiations, and possibly a violation of the Logan Act. In response, several similar petitions were posted on March 9, 2015. One petition, entitled "File charges against the 47 United States Senators in violation of the Logan Act in attempting to undermine a nuclear agreement", passed the 100,000-signature threshold within one day. The petition had reached the number 1 spot, garnering more than 320,000 signatures by April 8, 2015, more than three times the number of signatures required to qualify for a response from the White House.

=== Trump taxes ===
"Within hours" of President Donald Trump's inauguration on January 20, 2017, two petitions had been started on the site. One, for the release of his taxes, "with all information needed to verify emoluments clause compliance" reached the 100,000 signature threshold within twenty-four hours. Another, for the President to divest himself of his assets or put them in a blind trust, had some seventy-seven thousand. On January 22, Presidential aide Kellyanne Conway declared that the tax returns will not be released. On January 27, the petitions had over 385,000 and 119,000 signatures, respectively, with the former being a record number of signatures for any petition on the site. By the February 17 deadline to reach 100,000 signatures, it had exceeded one million signatures, making it the first petition on the site to do so.

=== American Antifa ===
In August 2017, a petition requesting that Antifa be classified by the Pentagon as a terrorist organization was launched. The petition had over 100,000 signatures within three days. The final count before White House responded was 368,423. The originator of the petition, who goes by the pseudonym "Microchip", remarked to Politico that getting conservatives to share and discuss the petition was the entire point, rather than prompting any concrete action by the government. The White House responded to the petition, stating "Although Federal law provides a mechanism to designate and sanction foreign terrorist organizations and foreign state sponsors of terrorism, there is currently no analogous mechanism for formally designating domestic terrorist organizations. Nonetheless, law enforcement has many tools at its disposal to address violent individuals and groups."

== Criticism ==
Concerns about the efficacy of We the People have been raised since before the first White House responses were published.

On August 13, 2013, the Washington Post website published an article about 30 petitions that had been left unanswered for an average of 240 days despite each having met the signature goals. The article refers to the website www.whpetitions.info for taking "its own tally and highlights petitions that have received enough signatures but have not received responses."

As of 16 October 2016, 323 White House petitions have met their signature thresholds. The White House has responded to 321 of them (99%) with an average response time of 117 days. Average waiting time for unanswered petitions was 23 days, according to whpetitions.info.

The Obama White House faced criticism for the choice of administration official selected to answer petitions regarding the legalization of marijuana. Gil Kerlikowske, the Director of the Office of National Drug Control Policy, was chosen to craft the administration's response. The criticism stemmed from the Office of National Drug Control Policy Reauthorization Act of 1998, which legally required that the Director oppose all attempts to legalize the use of illicit drugs in any form.

Other complaints of We the People focused on its technical glitches, democratic rationale, and political dilemmas. There was criticism about the willingness of the administration to answer petitions that meet the threshold for response, when several qualifying petitions have been unanswered for months or years. In addition, the digital divide means that poor communities may have had difficulty participating equally in We The People.

During the first weeks of the presidency of Donald Trump, The Independent and The A.V. Club reported that many popular petitions did not appear to be receiving any signatures. Additionally, certain URLs to the petitions led to error pages. Macon Phillips, the man behind We the People, told BuzzFeed News that the issue stemmed from issues with its cache. He also thought that Trump's administration "is still trying to get their heads around how it works".

== Discontinuation ==
On January 20, 2021, the day the Inauguration of Joe Biden took place, the website's address started redirecting to the White House's main web address. First reported by the Ron Paul Institute, the White House declined comment when a reporter from Newsweek asked about the apparent discontinuation of the website.

== See also ==
- UK Parliament petitions website
- Right to petition in the United States
