= Bureau of Global Public Affairs =

U.S. State Department division

- Seal of the United States Department of State

Bureau overview
- Formed: May 28, 2019
- Preceding agencies: Bureau of Public Affairs; Bureau of International Information Programs
- Jurisdiction: Executive branch of the United States
- Bureau executives: Dylan Johnson, Assistant Secretary of State for Global Public Affairs; Camille P. Dawson, Principal Deputy Assistant Secretary of State for Global Public Affairs
- Parent department: U.S. Department of State
- Website: Official website

The Bureau of Global Public Affairs is a bureau of the United States Department of State that communicates the department's policy decisions to the public. The bureau was formed on May 28, 2019, in a merger between the Bureau of Public Affairs and the Bureau of International Information Programs. It is led by the assistant secretary of state for global public affairs.

== History ==
When the Foreign Affairs Reform and Restructuring Act of 1998 abolished the United States Information Agency (USIA) on October 1, 1999, USIA's broadcasting functions were moved to the then newly created Broadcasting Board of Governors (BBG), and its non-broadcasting information functions were given to the then newly created Under Secretary of State for Public Diplomacy and Public Affairs. The Bureau of International Information Programs was created as a part of this restructuring.

On May 28, 2019, the Bureau of Public Affairs merged with the Bureau of International Information Programs into the Bureau of Global Public Affairs, and the duties of the assistant secretary of state merged into the duties of the assistant secretary of state for global public affairs.

=== Bureau of International Information Programs ===
Bureau of International Information Programs
- Seal of the United States Department of State

Bureau overview
- Dissolved: May 28, 2019
- Superseding bureau: Bureau of Global Public Affairs
- Jurisdiction: Executive branch of the United States
- Employees: 458 (As of 2013)
- Annual budget: $55 million
- Parent department: U.S. Department of State

The U.S. Department of State's Bureau of International Information Programs (IIP) supported the department's public diplomacy efforts by providing and supporting the places, content, and infrastructure to influence foreign audiences. It was headed by the Coordinator for International Information Programs. IIP was one of three bureaus that reported to the Undersecretary for Public Diplomacy and Public Affairs. The Bureau of Educational and Cultural Affairs and the Bureau of Public Affairs were its sister bureaus. On May 28, 2019, IIP merged with the Bureau of Public Affairs into the Bureau of Global Public Affairs, and the duties of IIP Coordinator merged into the duties of the Assistant Secretary of State for Global Public Affairs.

==== Mission and purpose ====
According to the bureau's page on the Department of State website, IIP "provides and supports the places, content, and infrastructure needed for sustained conversations with foreign audiences to build America's reputation abroad".

Physical and virtual places include over 700 American Spaces around the world, as well as a large social media community that numbers over 12 million followers. Content includes publications, video, and U.S. expert speakers, who engage foreign audiences both in person and through virtual programs. An example of this is the Arabic-language Twitter channel @USAbilAraby. IIP managed the infrastructure for all embassy and consulate websites, translations of public remarks by the President and Secretary, and maintains internal websites with resources for use by public diplomacy officers for overseas programs.

==== Responsibilities ====
The Bureau of International Information Programs provided public diplomacy materials and support in three primary areas:

Digital

IIP operates the department's embassy and consulate websites (http://usembassy.gov) in over 60 languages. IIP also supports embassy social media efforts with Facebook pages and Twitter sites in six languages.

IIP also operates an interactive web-chat platform that links foreign audiences to U.S. subject matter experts, opinion-makers, community leaders, and government officials in more than 800 programs each year. In September 2014, the bureau launched a new social sharing platform ShareAmerica to distribute public diplomacy content.

American Spaces

American Spaces exemplify the United States commitment to a core tenet of democracy: the citizen's right to free access to information. Hosting more than 16 million visits each year, American Spaces supports public diplomacy by creating a place for in-person engagement with foreign audiences. Over 700 Spaces are hosted in embassies, schools, libraries, and other partner institutions in 169 countries. They provide information about United States' policy, culture, and values as well as study in the United States. They also support English language learning and activities for alumni of international visitor programs.

Public Diplomacy (PD) Content

IIP creates and curates content that provides context and information on U.S. foreign policy topics in a variety of formats ranging from video to print publications to audiobooks, reaching more than one billion people a year. Much of this content, along with transcripts of the Secretary's and President's speeches, is available to embassies in multiple languages. IIP also produces more than 125 video products each year and recruits more than 650 speakers annually, including Supreme Court justices, renowned authors, innovators, scholars, entrepreneurs, journalists, and sports figures who connect directly with more than 160,000 people in local markets via in-country and virtual events.

Analytics

IIP has an advanced analytics capacity to measure output, campaign performance, perform audience analysis and track over 2,000 Department of State social media properties.

==== Leadership ====
Macon Phillips served as IIP coordinator from 2013 to 2017.

Todd Leventhal, Chief of the Misinformation Team, U.S. Department of State and Dante Chinni, Senior Associate, Project for Excellence in Journalism at Washington Foreign Press Center Briefing on "Accuracy in the Media: Misinformation, Mistakes, and Misleading in American and Other Media."

==== Sub-agencies ====
The Counter Misinformation Team or Counter Mis-information Team (CMT), headed by Todd Leventhal, was part of the Bureau of International Information Programs. CMT was originally formed to counter Soviet misinformation during the Cold War. and was tasked with responding to alleged misinformation and disinformation about the United States government. It was discontinued at the end of the Bush administration.

In an attempt to debunk 9/11 conspiracy theories, CMT released "The Top September 11 Conspiracy Theories" report on August 28, 2006.

=== Bureau of Public Affairs ===
Bureau of Public Affairs
- Seal of the United States Department of State

Bureau overview
- Formed: 1944; 82 years ago
- Dissolved: May 28, 2019
- Superseding bureau: Bureau of Global Public Affairs
- Jurisdiction: Executive branch of the United States
- Headquarters: Harry S. Truman Building, Washington, D.C., United States
- Employees: 209 (as of 2010)
- Annual budget: $13.5 million (FY 2009)
- Parent department: U.S. Department of State

The Bureau of Public Affairs (PA) was the part of the United States Department of State that carries out the secretary of state's mandate to help Americans understand the importance of foreign policy. The bureau was led by the assistant secretary of state for public affairs.

The PA Bureau pursued the State Department's mission to inform the American people and to feed their concerns and comments back to the policymakers. It accomplished this in a variety of ways, which included:

- Strategic and tactical planning to advance the Administration's priority foreign policy goals;
- Conducting press briefings for domestic and foreign press corps;
- Pursuing media outreach, enabling Americans everywhere to hear directly from key Department officials through local, regional and national media interviews;
- Managing the State Department's websites and developing web pages with up-to-date information about U.S. foreign policy;
- Answering questions from the public about current foreign policy issues by phone, email, or letter;
- Arranging town meetings and scheduling speakers to visit communities to discuss U.S. foreign policy and why it is important to all Americans;
- Producing and coordinating audio-visual products and services in the U.S. and abroad for the public, the press, the Secretary of State, and Department bureaus and offices;
- Preparing historical studies on U.S. diplomacy and foreign affairs matters.

==== Office of Regional Media Outreach ====
The Office of Regional Media Outreach (RMO) provided local, regional, specialty, and national media a central connection point to department newsmakers.

Their database of newsmakers enabled members of the media to quickly find an expert at the department to provide insight, analysis, and expertise on foreign affairs, news and events. Searches could be made by name, issue, position or language spoken. Once an expert was identified, their staff would set up an interview for television, radio, or print media.

They listed their forty-seven available experts.

==== Office of Electronic Information ====
The Office of Electronic Information and Publications oversaw the State Department's website, gathering information from all other parts of the Department, as well as participating in the process of publishing printed documents.

==== Issues and press ====
This tab of the State Department's website gives the official U.S. position on the major issues in the news. As it is the official publication of opinion from the U.S. State Department, it offers its own view of an issue, and any reports that support it. It is a start for preliminary research. On this same tab you can find daily press briefings from the major outlets of official statement. A record of "Remarks, Testimony: Senior Officials" since 2001, "Daily Briefings" and "Remarks, Testimony: Senior Officials" Also available is a statement from Secretary Rice. RSS Feeds and press releases from the Foreign Press Center, USAID, and the U.S. Mission to the United Nations (USUN). There is a section dedicated to audio and video content, including podcasts. "Major State Department Publications" giving information on past bribery charges and a "Guide to Doing Business" in the U.S. are all available online.

==== Travel and business ====
This tab of State's website offers important information and tips for traveling and business. For travel, they offer information on properly documenting your identity on trips. Also included is information on visas, and the developing technology of "e-passports".

For business, they offer studies on major foreign markets and subsequent regulations, and provide a tool for international market research.

== See also ==
- Public diplomacy
- United States Information Agency
