= USAbilAraby =

USAbilAraby is the name used by the US Department of State's Arabic Media Hub for its Twitter account and YouTube channel. The name, "USAbilAraby," means "USA in Arabic." As this suggests, the Twitter account tweets messages from the US government, primarily in Arabic and typed in Arabic script. Similarly, the YouTube channel broadcasts official messages in Arabic. USAbilAraby's first tweet appeared on February 9, 2011; its first video was posted on May 4, 2011.

== History ==
The USAbilAraby Twitter account began tweeting on February 9, 2011. Its first tweet read:

#Egypt #Jan25 تعترف وزارة الخارجية الأمريكية بالدور التاريخي الذي يلعبه الإعلام الإجتماعي في العالم العربي ونرغب أن نكون جزءاً من محادثاتكم

In English: "The US State Department recognizes the historic role that social media is playing in the Arab world and we want to be part of your conversations #Jan25 #Egypt"

Within hours of that first tweet, the account had close to 300 followers; as of April 17, 2011, the account had 6,208 followers and was included on 194 lists. By 2022 this had grown to over 1.5 million followers.

The USAbilAraby YouTube channel began posting content on May 4, 2011. Its first video was titled "USG Official discusses death of former al Qa'ida leader Osama bin Laden (May 4, 2011)."

== Political Context ==
=== Arab Spring ===
The USAbilAraby Twitter account began tweeting during Arab Spring. This was triggered in part by the self-immolation of Mohamed Bouazizi on December 17 in Sidi Bouzid, Tunisia. When USAbilAraby began tweeting, the Tunisian Revolution had led to the ousting of then-president Zine El Abidine Ben Ali. The hashtags "#Egypt" and "#Jan25" in USAbilAraby's first tweet are references to the 2011 Egyptian Revolution, which began on January 25, 2011, and was, at that time, underway. Major protests in Yemen and Algeria, were also currently occurring. Protests in Bahrain, Iraq, and Kuwait began soon afterward, on February 9. On the same day, the Syrian government lifted its four-year ban on YouTube and Facebook.

=== Death of Osama bin Laden ===
The USAbilAraby YouTube channel posted its first content three days after Osama bin Laden was killed by US Navy SEALs in Abbottabad, Pakistan.

=== US State Department ===
USAbilAraby can be considered part of US Secretary of State, Hillary Clinton's 21st Century Statecraft project. 21st century statecraft is defined as "complementing traditional foreign policy tools with newly innovated and adapted instruments of statecraft that fully leverage the networks, technologies, and demographics of our interconnected world." In the same vein, four days after USAbilAraby began tweeting, USAdarFarsi (meaning "USA in Persian") was launched.

The USAbilAraby Twitter profile describes the account as being connected to the US Department of State's Arabic Media Hub. However, the State Department's website doesn't specifically provide any information about such an organization by name. As a result, it is unclear what responsibilities it may have. Its set of responsibilities may, for example, resemble those of the US State Department's East Asia and Pacific Media Hub, the mission of which "is to help media organizations in the East Asia and Pacific region find U.S. Government officials to interview, on whatever topic or issue is of interest." The East Asia and Pacific Media Hub offers to arrange film, radio, and telephone interviews with US officials for the media, and currently has presences on both Twitter and Facebook and can be reached by email. The use of the word "hub" in "US Department of State Arabic Media Hub" suggests that the USAbilAraby Twitter account and YouTube channel may be joined by additional Arabic-language presences in social media in the future.

== Reactions ==
The launch of the USAbilAraby Twitter account received more attention in US media than in Arab media. However, an article on AlBaghdadiya.com attributes the appearance of the USAbilAraby Twitter account to the events in Tunisia and Egypt and the value of channels like Twitter and Facebook for publishing news quickly and widely within this context. Similarly, an article on Raya.fm locates USAbilAraby within a larger phenomenon of new Arabic-language offerings from Western news outlets and bloggers, inspired by these events.

== Language ==
It has been noted that USAbilAraby's tweets employ Modern Standard Arabic, a formal register commonly used in media and official discourse. This contrasts with other forms of Arabic used in social media contexts, particularly by non-institutional actors; these forms often employ dialect and may be typed in the Roman alphabet (see, for example, Arabizi).
