= Macon Phillips =

American government official

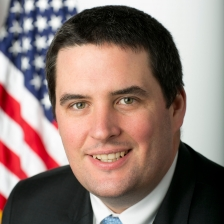

6th Coordinator for International Information Programs
- In office September 23, 2013 – January 20, 2017
- President: Barack Obama
- Preceded by: Dawn McCall
- Succeeded by: Position abolished

White House Director of New Media
- In office January 20, 2009 – September 23, 2013
- President: Barack Obama

Personal details
- Born: June 29, 1978 (age 47) Huntsville, Alabama, U.S.
- Political party: Democratic
- Education: Duke University (BA)

Macon Phillips (born June 29, 1978) is an American political strategist who served as the Coordinator of the United States Department of State Bureau of International Information Programs from 2013 to 2017. He reported to Rick Stengel, the Under Secretary for Public Diplomacy and Public Affairs. Phillips is the former White House Director of New Media, in which capacity he had oversight responsibility for WhiteHouse.gov.

Phillips' work on WhiteHouse.gov closely coordinated with internet operations at the Democratic National Committee, which has responsibility for administration of the BarackObama.com domain and website. At precisely 12:00 p.m. ET during the inauguration of Barack Obama, Phillips oversaw the conversion of Whitehouse.gov, the official website of the President of the United States. At 12:01 p.m., he posted the site's first blog entry, titled: Change has come to WhiteHouse.gov.

== Early life and education ==
Phillips is a 1996 graduate of the Randolph School in Huntsville, Alabama, and a sociology graduate of Duke University.

== Political career ==
Phillips is a former director of strategy and communications for Washington, D.C.–based Blue State Digital, a private web design firm that eventually became closely tied to the 2008 Barack Obama presidential campaign for whom he worked for as an internet strategist. Phillips had previously worked for Democratic Florida State Senator Rod Smith as a senior strategist during the 2006 Florida gubernatorial election. He had also worked for Ted Kennedy.

Phillips was the Director of New Media for the Presidential transition of Barack Obama and had oversight responsibility for Change.gov. In fact, he turned the website on the morning after the 2008 Barack Obama election victory speech. Prior to that he was involved in BarackObama.com and directed the technological initiative to announce the selection of Joe Biden as the Democratic nominee to be Vice President of the United States. Philips' new media efforts during the 2008 United States presidential election helped raise vast sums of money for the Obama presidential campaign, while his text messaging, online videos and social networking skills led the campaign in many organizational and informational ways. Blue State Digital created and managed Obama's campaign site, which brought in a million Facebook friends and about $500 million. In 2012 Phillips featured in TechCrunch's list of "20 Most Innovative People in Democracy."

In early August 2009, Phillips was publicly criticized for asking members of the public—via a blogpost at whitehouse.gov—to forward "fishy" emails regarding healthcare reform, raising privacy concerns in the process. On August 17, 2009, the White House closed down flag@whitehouse.gov, the e-mail address created to receive those reports.

In September 2013, United States Secretary of State John Kerry hired Philips as the head of the Bureau of International Information Programs in order to spearhead the overhaul of America's "digital diplomacy" efforts. On November 20, 2013, he met with the Russian participants of the U.S.-Russia Young Journalist Exchange.

== Personal ==
Phillips is the brother of Metropolitan Opera lyric soprano Susanna Phillips. He is married to Emily Price Phillips. They had a son, Max, in November 2012. His parents are Dr. Macon and Barbara Phillips.

== See also ==
- Jesse Lee (politician)

Political offices
Preceded by Dawn McCall	Coordinator for the Bureau of International Information Programs; 2013–2017	Succeeded by Jonathan Henick; Acting
