= Joe Rospars =

American businessman (born 1981)

- Born: Joseph Rospars; April 15, 1981 (age 45)
- Education: George Washington University (BA)
- Occupation: CEO of Blue State Digital

Joe Rospars (born 15 April 1981) is one of the founders of Blue State Digital and formerly the "Chief Strategist" for Elizabeth Warren's 2020 presidential campaign. Rospars was the New Media Director for Barack Obama's presidential campaigns in both 2008 and 2012. Rospars also was Barack Obama's principal digital strategist and adviser. He managed the digital integration of fundraising, communications, and mobilization of grassroots effort. Prior to Obama's campaign, he worked with Governor Howard Dean at the Democratic National Committee, Dean's campaign for party chairman, and at Democracy for America, and on Howard Dean's 2004 presidential campaign. Rospars has a bachelor's degree in political science from the George Washington University.
