= Twitter usage =

Applications for the service

Since the launch of Twitter on July 15, 2006, there have been many notable uses for the service in a variety of environments, including political, economic, social and cultural uses. As users tweet their messages on Twitter, they encourage other people to respond and engage in online discussions as well as offline activities. User engagement on Twitter is usually measured with likes, replies and retweets and is a form of social power.

After the 2022 acquisition of Twitter by Elon Musk, Twitter was rebranded as X; however, the X platform is still widely referred to as Twitter.

== In legal proceedings ==
The first criminal prosecution arising from Twitter posts was started in April 2009. FBI agents arrested Daniel Knight Hayden, who was accused of sending threatening tweets in connection with his plan to attend a Tea Party protest in Oklahoma City, Oklahoma.

In July 2009, Horizon Realty Group, a Chicago real estate management company, sued a former tenant, Amanda Bonnen, for libel based on a Twitter message she sent to friends. Horizon contended that Bonnen defamed Horizon by posting a tweet to her friends that said, "You should just come anyway. Who said sleeping in a moldy apartment was bad for you? Horizon realty thinks it's ok." Horizon asked for at least $50,000 for the alleged libel. The lawsuit prompted widespread comment from journalists, bloggers, and legal experts. In January 2010, Cook County Circuit Court Judge Diane J. Larsen granted Bonnen's motion to dismiss, stating that the statement was "too vague" to amount to defamation.

In October 2010, PhoneDog unsuccessfully sued employee Noah Kravitz in PhoneDog v. Kravitz for misusing trade secrets after he quit his job and began using the PhoneDog Twitter account to post Tweets for a competitor.

In February 2012, Hamza Kashgari, a Saudi poet and a former columnist for the Saudi daily newspaper Al-Bilad, became the subject of a religious and legal controversy after being accused of insulting the prophet Mohammad in three tweets published on Twitter. Kashgari risks the death penalty for his three tweets. King Abdullah of Saudi Arabia ordered that Kashgari be arrested "for crossing red lines and denigrating religious beliefs in God and His Prophet." Kashgari left Saudi Arabia, trying to seek political asylum in New Zealand. He was deported from Kuala Lumpur back to Saudi Arabia on February 12, about three and a half hours before a Malaysian High Court injunction against the deportation was issued.

In November 2013, Agence France-Presse and Getty Images were ordered to pay $1.2 million compensation to freelance photojournalist Daniel Morel for using his images posted on Twitter related to the 2010 Haiti earthquake without his permission, in violation of copyright and Twitter's terms of service.

== In education ==
Research on using Twitter in education has been conducted by Dr. Reynol Junco and his colleagues. Using a controlled experimental design with random assignment, they found that classroom use of Twitter in specific ways such as continuing course discussions outside of class led to significant increases in student engagement and grades for all of their courses. Junco and his colleagues have also found that these benefits only apply when professors interact with students on Twitter, when they require Twitter use as part of a course, and when Twitter is integrated into the curriculum in ways that make sense for that particular course. This data shows the benefits of Twitter as compared to other static educational technology tools such as blogs, wikis, and learning management systems.

The Distance College of Shanghai Jiao Tong University, China, used Twitter with native Chinese students to train communicative and cultural competence. Students had to post a number of English tweets and react to the tweets of their fellow students. Twitter was viewed as a supplement to practice different aspects of the target language in authentic environment.

Mia Moody states that Twitter can be used to teach students. They will be more involved in lectures and lessons if they have a chance to use social media throughout the course. Social media has changed the way people live, connect, and do business. She also explains how it is a good way to improve student participation. Shy students are more likely to open up behind a computer screen or the screen of their smartphone.

The University of Vienna, Austria, used Twitter as an evaluation platform for student ratings. Every student had to send a tweet after each course unit with feedback to the teacher. Twitter's simplicity and electronic data handling required small administrative effort and turned out to be "a useful tool for evaluating a course formatively."

At the University of Texas at Dallas, Twitter has been incorporated into the classroom setting of History courses with large groups of students. This allows more students to express their views in the class discussions and forces them to focus on the central point due to the character limit.

According to The Daily Telegraph, Twitter is put on the new primary school curriculum. Children should be able to "organise and adjust" speaking and writing skills depending on the technology being used, including using "emails, messaging, wikis and twitters." During the primary years, children should also be taught to speak, write and broadcast using "blogs, podcasts, websites, email [and] video."

In 2009, higher education faculty began using Twitter to help establish social presence and just-in-time interaction with students who are not bound by a learning management system.

Educational organizations in Spain and other countries also use Twitter in the virtual classrooms. Such is the cause of Universidad Oberta de Catalunya, Postgraduate School. Students utilize Twitter to summarize courses learning outcomes.

An example of an educational Twitter account is @RealTimeWWII, which tweets the events of World War II on a daily basis from 2011 until 2017.

== In health and medicine ==
There have been many applications of social media within health contexts, ranging from the World Health Organization using Twitter during the H1N1 pandemic, with more than 11,700 followers, to medical practices and health professionals obtaining information to inform their clinical practice.

The use of web 2.0 tools and especially Twitter is in full expansion. Twitter has jumped from the personal field to the professional with great success, joining as a means of regular dissemination in scientific congresses. Although initially the tweeted community was small and a few were responsible for a majority of tweets, the progressive growth and penetration of Twitter has made that in recent congresses, these influencers and institutional accounts are no longer the main driver of the use of Twitter in the congresses. Given the global trend, it is expected that tools such as Twitter play an increasingly important role in the management and transmission of knowledge, as well as in the creation of collaborative networks between professionals.

== In emergencies ==
Research reported in New Scientist in May 2008 found that blogs, maps, photo sites and instant messaging systems like Twitter did a better job of getting information out during emergencies than either the traditional news media or government emergency services. The study also found that those using Twitter during the fires in California in October 2007 kept their followers (who were often friends and neighbors) informed of their whereabouts and of the location of various fires minute by minute. Relief effort organizations are also using Twitter. The American Red Cross started using Twitter to exchange minute-by-minute information about local disasters including statistics and directions.

During the 2008 Mumbai attacks, eyewitnesses sent an estimated 16 tweets every second. Twitter users on the ground helped compile a list of the dead and injured. In addition, users sent out vital information such as emergency phone numbers and the location of hospitals needing blood donations. CNN called this "the day that social media appeared to come of age" since many different groups made significant use of Twitter to gather news and coordinate responses.

In January 2009, US Airways Flight 1549 experienced multiple bird strikes and had to land in water in the Hudson River. Janis Krums, a passenger on one of the ferries that rushed to help, took a picture of the downed plane as passengers were still evacuating and sent it to Twitpic before any other media arrived at the scene. For this he won the Shorty Award for Real-Time Photo of the Year.

The Victorian Country Fire Authority in Australia used Twitter to send out regular alerts and updates regarding the February 2009 bushfires. The then Prime Minister of Australia Kevin Rudd used his Twitter account to send out information on the fires, how to donate money and blood, and where to seek emergency help.

In April 2009, public health departments used Twitter to provide updates on H1N1 cases.

Twitter was also massively used in 2014 Balkan floods. Its efficiency and speed was considered to be "very useful" in exchanging information about flood victims and missing persons.

== In public opinion and trends ==
During the CBC News television coverage of the Canadian federal election on October 14, 2008, the CBC cited tweets regarding Elizabeth May and Stéphane Dion along with a graph of items mentioned on Twitter as evidence that people were calling for Dion to step down in response to the election results.

As of April 26, 2010, the Australian television program Q&A began showing selected tweets on screen during the live broadcast, which carried the hashtag "#qanda".

=== Ratio ===
The ratio is a tongue-in-cheek rule-of-thumb method of judging how popular a Twitter post is, by comparing the number of replies and/or quote retweets to likes. A comment that has many replies but few likes is judged likely to be unpopular and the replies are likely those expressing disapproval. Another common form of ratio is when a reply or quote retweet (typically expressing an opposing viewpoint to the original post) gets more likes than the post it is replying to, signifying that more people agree with the reply than the original post. Twitter users may "initiate" a ratio by replying or quote retweeting a tweet with the text "ratio" in the hopes that their tweet acquires more likes and/or retweets than the tweet being replied to. They may not always succeed; a "ratio" tweet that does not achieve this is known as a failed ratio or flop.

=== Social trends ===
Analyzing frequency, content and other metrics of how users interact with Twitter can uncover social trends and social networks. "As users interact via social media spaces, like Twitter, they form connections that emerge into complex social network structures. These connections are indicators of content sharing, and network structures reflect patterns of information flow."

== Politics and protests ==
Twitter has been instrumental in politics and protests. One of Twitter's mission statements is, "At Twitter, we believe that the open exchange of information can have a positive global impact." People around the world have taken this idea, using the 140-character tweet (later doubled to 280 characters) to spark an interest or gain attention for a cause or issue.

Politicians have used it in attempts to influence their followers and persuade their opponents.

=== Campaigning ===
Twitter was used by candidates in the 2008 U.S. presidential campaign throughout the race. Democratic Party nominee Barack Obama used it for publicity. The Nader–Gonzalez campaign updated its ballot access teams in real time with Twitter and Google Maps. Twitter use increased by 43% on the day of the United States 2008 election.

In 2009, the Republican Party in Connecticut set up 33 fake Twitter accounts in the names of the Democratic Party members of the state legislature. The Republicans used the accounts to send out tweets in the names of the Democrats. When Twitter discovered the scheme, it shut down the fake accounts, quoting the applicable company policy. The Hartford Courant editorialized: "Republicans get an A for innovation, but a D for ethics."

During the 2010 federal election campaign in Australia, the New South Wales Opposition Leader Barry O'Farrell publicly tweeted comments about the Liberal party's readiness for the election, thinking he was sending a private message to a journalist.

=== Examples of impact ===
During the 13th Federal Assembly in May 2009, two members of the German Bundestag leaked the result of the German presidential election via Twitter before the president of the Bundestag officially announced Horst Köhler as the winner. In June 2009, following the allegations of fraud in the Iranian presidential election, protesters used Twitter as a rallying tool and method of communication with the outside world after the government blocked several other modes of communication.

On June 15, 2009, Twitter rescheduled a planned 90-minute maintenance outage after a number of Twitter users and the U.S. State Department asked Twitter executives to delay the shutdown because of concerns about the service's role as a primary communication medium by the protesters in Iran. CNN's coverage of the conflict was criticized in tweets with the hashtag "#CNNfail". Twitter was also used to organize DDoS attacks against Iranian government websites.

In August 2009, when American opponents of President Barack Obama's health insurance reform proposals attacked the British National Health Service, thousands of NHS users took part in a Twitter campaign expressing their support for the NHS with use of the "#welovetheNHS" hashtag. The hashtag was initiated by Irish comedy writer Graham Linehan, who said he wanted to use a Twitter campaign "as a counterweight against the lies of the American right". The campaign also received the support of several politicians including British prime minister Gordon Brown.

New York City activist Elliott Madison used Twitter to message an order to disperse from the Pittsburgh police during the 2009 G-20 Pittsburgh protests. Police raided Madison's hotel room, and one week later Madison's New York home was raided by FBI agents, who conducted a sixteen-hour search. Police claim Madison and a co-defendant used computers and a radio scanner to track police movements and then passed on that information to protesters using cell phones and Twitter. Madison is being charged with hindering apprehension or prosecution, criminal use of a communication facility, and possession of instruments of crime. The FBI collected miscellany such as refrigerator magnets, and a Curious George stuffed animal, despite that the warrant issued asked for evidence that indicated potential violations of federal rioting laws. In light of the United States Department of State's recent public support of Twitter use in the politics of Iran, Moldova, and Honduras, it is asked whether the State Department supports free speech in the United States.

In October 2009, after The Guardian newspaper was served with an injunction banning it from reporting on a parliamentary matter, it published a cryptic article with the few details it was allowed to report. The paper claimed that this case appears "to call into question privileges guaranteeing free speech established under the 1688 Bill of Rights". The paper's editor Alan Rusbridger credited Twitter users with taking the initiative to provide details that the press was not allowed to print, namely, that the injunction was taken out by the London solicitor Carter-Ruck on behalf of commodities trader Trafigura, who did not want public discussion of the 2006 Côte d'Ivoire toxic waste dump scandal and the resulting Minton Report (available on WikiLeaks). The reporting injunction was withdrawn by Carter-Ruck the next day before The Guardian could challenge it in the High Court. Rusbridger credited the rapid back-down of Carter-Ruck to Twitter, as did a BBC article.

Twitter came to the attention of the House of Commons of Canada in October 2009 when Member of Parliament Ujjal Dosanjh apologized on the floor for improperly "tweeting about matters that ought not to have been tweeted about" during "in camera" proceedings of a parliamentary committee.

In October 2009, Twitter once again came to the attention of the Canadian public when Vancouver Councilor Andrea Reimer tweeted regarding the British Columbia Minister of Housing and Social Development Rich Coleman's weight in response to provincial legislation proposed by Coleman to bring homeless people to shelters during extreme weather. Reimer posted that instead of police bringing homeless people to shelters during extreme weather that she was thinking of introducing legislation to have the police bring Coleman to Jenny Craig, an international weight loss company, on his next visit to Vancouver. Coleman responded by calling the comment amateurish and from a Councilor that "doesn't know any better." Reimer later apologized for the posting.

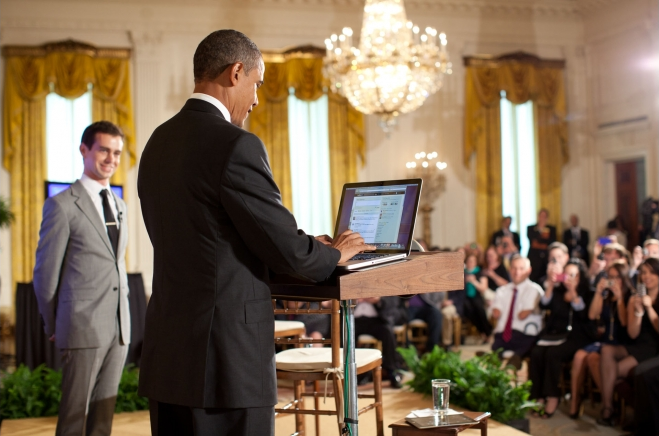
Dorsey said after the Twitter Town Hall with Barack Obama held in July 2011, that Twitter received over 110,000 tweets with #askobama.

In December 2009, the Supreme Federal Court of Brazil became the first court in the world to display items on the day planner of the ministers, to inform the actions that arrive daily to the Court, and the most important decisions made by them on Twitter.

In late December 2009, the Ukrainian non-profit organization Internet-Ukraine launched a project aimed at monitoring the 2010 Ukrainian presidential election based on Twitter.

On April 22, 2010, during the 2010 United Kingdom general election, several right-wing British newspapers including the Daily Telegraph, the Daily Express, and The Sun reported several news stories regarding the leader of the Liberal Democrats Nick Clegg, including political donations made to his private bank account. This was seen by users on Twitter as a personal attack on Clegg on the day that the second Prime Ministerial television debate was to take place after he performed well in the first. In response to the articles, Twitter users set up the hashtag "#nickcleggsfault", in which people made ironic comments claiming that Clegg was to blame for everything wrong in the world. A Daily Mail article claiming Clegg had made a Nazi slur was criticised for being based on an article that Clegg wrote in November 2002 in which, "he criticises attitudes to Germany which seem stuck in the 1950s—and fail to recognise how it has reinvented itself since", and made references to the Daily Mail's support for Adolf Hitler in the 1930s. By midday on 22 April, the "#nickcleggsfault" was the second-most tweeted hashtag on Twitter globally, second to Earth Day, and the most tweeted hashtag in the United Kingdom.

Twitter was used during the Egyptian Revolution of 2011; it was used as a tool to disseminate information and coordinate participants in the uprising, although Twitter was blocked by Egyptian mobile phone operators for a period of time. After the Egyptian Revolution, the most important people, ministries and the president started to have accounts on Twitter and publicize information. The then-newly-created Arabic-language account of the U.S. Department of State, @USAbilAraby, was used to provide American commentary directed toward Arabic speakers.

Since September 21, 2011, Twitter has had a way for politicians to advertise via the site, through "politically flavored" promoted tweets; they are marked with a purple icon. Candidates and political committees are also able to pay Twitter for Promoted Accounts and Promoted Trends. As of September 2011, "About 85 U.S. Senators use Twitter, and 360 members of the House of Representatives also have accounts. The vast majority of state governors—42 of 50—are on Twitter, too. And of course, all the current major presidential contenders are using the microblogging service."

In the 2012 Presidential election after news agencies declared that Ohio had been won by Barack Obama giving him enough electoral votes to win, the first statement of his reaction was released on Twitter, "We're all in this together. That's how we campaigned, and that's who we are. Thank you. -bo" A second Tweet with a picture of Obama hugging his wife with the caption "four more years" became the most re-tweeted tweet in Twitter history (later surpassed), and the election became one of the most tweeted political events in history.

In December 2012, Green MP Russel Norman tabled a tweet during New Zealand parliament's question time, a first for the country.

The @feministhulk Twitter account drew attention to funding problems for WIC food and nutrition programs during the 2013 US government shutdown, and its owner set up a directory for women in need to find food banks and infant formula.

== In public relations ==
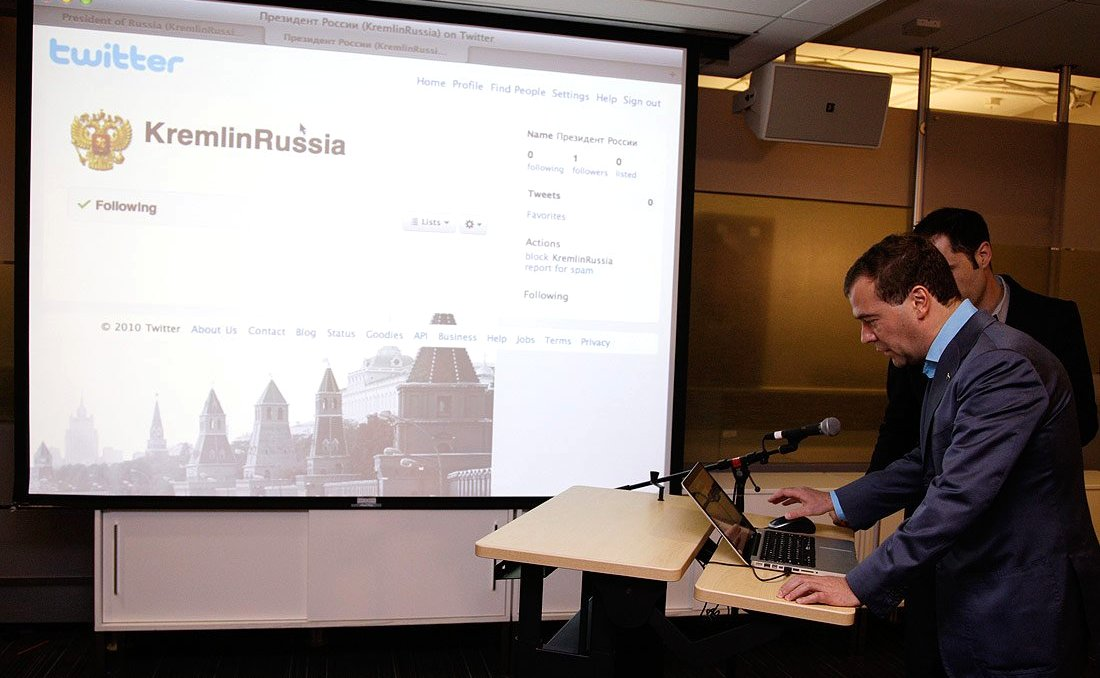
Russian president Dmitry Medvedev opens a Twitter account in Twitter's offices on 23 June 2010.

In Britain the Department for Business, Innovation and Skills released a Twitter strategy document written for other departments. The strategy advised the departments on why Twitter was used by the Government and how they could tweet and promote their doing so effectively. The ICAEW suggested that the document could also be useful to the private sector or as a general introduction to Twitter.

In the United States a number of environment agencies and NGOs are using Twitter. At the local level, police and fire departments are beginning to use Twitter to keep the public informed of incidents. Some of these departments, such as the Los Angeles Fire Department, issue up to 10 tweets per day.

In October 2008, a draft U.S. Army intelligence report identified Twitter as a "potential terrorist tool". The report said it "is already used by some members to post and/or support extremist ideologies and perspectives."

David Saranga of the Israeli Ministry of Foreign Affairs announced on December 30, 2008, that Israel would be the first government to hold a worldwide press conference via Twitter to take questions from the public about the war against Hamas in Gaza.

Doctors Chao Guo and Gregory D. Saxton have conducted a study of how nonprofit organizations use Twitter in their public relations campaigns. "Tweeting Social Change: How Social Media Are Changing Nonprofit Advocacy (2014)" has supported earlier studies that tweets sent out by nonprofit organizations fall into three categories of information, community, and action. Their sample included 188 "Civil Rights and Advocacy" organizations, and they used both quantitative and qualitative research in their study at the organizational and message levels. They found that information messages were the most frequent with an emphasis on public education, followed by community messages, and then action messages. Guo and Saxton also discuss how nonprofit organizations use certain aspects of Twitter such as direct messages, retweets, and hashtags (#) in building their campaigns.

=== Image repair ===
Many studies have documented the use of social media platforms for image repair. Mia Moody-Ramirez and Hazel Cole (2018) explored the use of Twitter to repair the image of Yahoo Finance in January 2017, when the online publication misspelled "bigger" with an "n", in a Twitter link to a story on President-elect Donald Trump's plans to enlarge America's navy. The tweet containing the highly offensive racial slur "nigger" gained more than 1,000 retweets before Yahoo Finance deleted it, almost one hour after it was shared (Mezzofiore, 2017). Yahoo Finance published a mortified apology for the mistake shortly after. The company managed to keep the crisis confined to the social media platform. Much of the image repair for Yahoo Finance occurred after Twitter users began to share memes addressing the incident. Light-hearted humor shared on what is known collectively as Black Twitter provided comic relief that defused the situation. On the anniversary of the crisis, Twitter users continued to frame the incident as one of the all-time funniest moments on "Black Twitter." Social media can be a two-edged sword—creating the need to repair a tarnished image while also providing the platform to do so.

== In reporting dissent ==
On April 10, 2008, James Buck, a graduate journalism student at University of California, Berkeley, and his translator, Mohammed Maree, were arrested in Egypt for photographing a protest against the Egyptian authority's detention of protestors. On his way to the police station Buck used his mobile phone to send the message "Arrested" to his 48 Twitter followers. Those followers contacted UC Berkeley, the U.S. Embassy in Cairo, and a number of press organizations on his behalf. Buck was able to send updates about his condition to his followers while being detained. He was released the next day from the Mahalla jail after the college hired a lawyer for him.

On April 7, 2009, thousands of students stormed the presidency and the parliament building in Chișinău, the capital of Moldova, accusing the government of electoral fraud. Information about these events was disseminated through Twitter using hashtag "#pman", from the name of the central square in Chișinău: Piața Marii Adunări Naționale. Twitter was also used to mobilize the protests.

== In the science community ==
=== Space mission news ===
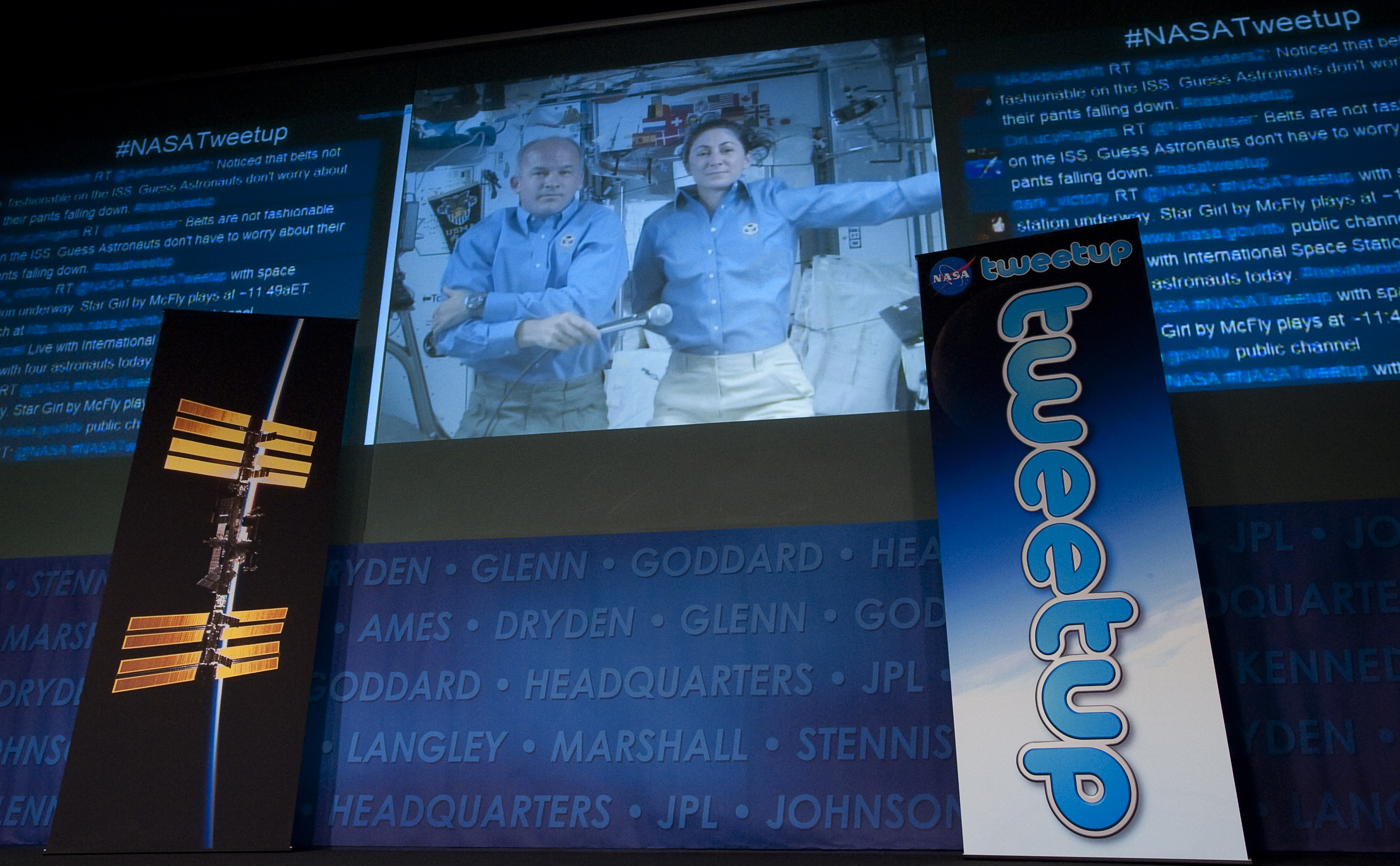
NASA's Space Station crew tweetup, October 21, 2009

In February 2009, NASA won a Shorty Award for its near real-time status updates in 2008 of the unmanned Mars Phoenix Lander mission.

In May 2009, astronaut Mike Massimino used Twitter to send updates during the Hubble Space Telescope repair mission (STS-125), the first time Twitter was used by an astronaut in space. The STS-125 mission marked another NASA/Twitter first—a post-mission tweetup held July 21, 2009, at NASA headquarters in Washington, D.C., attended by about 200 members of the general public. The crew of STS-125 was on hand to answer questions.

On October 21, 2009, Nicole Stott and her Expedition 21 crewmate Jeff Williams participated in the first tweetup from the International Space Station with about 35 members of the public at NASA headquarters. This involved the first live Twitter connection for the astronauts. Previously, astronauts aboard the Space Shuttle or ISS had sent the messages to Mission Control which then posted the messages via the Internet to Twitter.

In November 2009, the launch of STS-129 marked NASA's fifth tweetup, and its first such event ever held during a Shuttle launch at Kennedy Space Center in Cape Canaveral, Florida. One hundred members of the general public, representing Morocco, New Zealand, and 21 U.S. states, in addition to the District of Columbia, attended the two-day event and, for a time, the "#nasatweetup" hashtag reached #3 on Twitter's Trending Topics.

In May 2010, NASA organized a tweetup for the STS-132 Space Shuttle Atlantis mission to the International Space Station.

=== In robotics ===
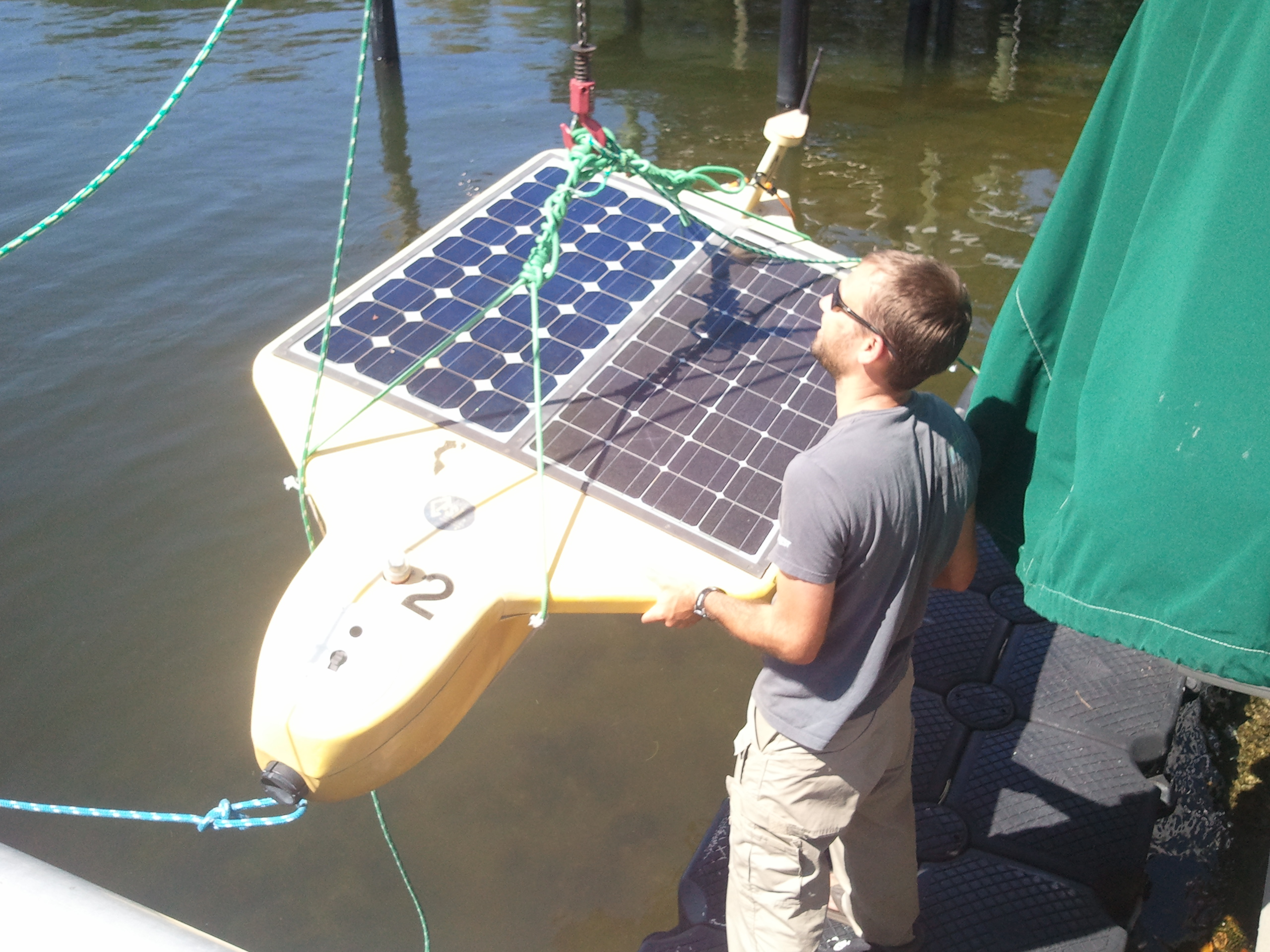
A University of South Florida researcher deploys Tavros02, a solar-powered "tweeting" AUV (SAUV).

Given its IM-like functionality, Twitter provides a unique platform to communicate real-time information from robotic machines to human managers, engineers and/or other interested parties. Numerous examples exist of robots whose sensor data is interpreted offline and tweeted by human operators. For example, NASA's humanoid-robot "Robonaut" has a Twitter feed with tweets posted by human operators. However, relatively few projects involve robots that post their own tweets without human intervention. The Japanese counterpart to Robonaut, Astrobot is expected to monitor health parameters of crew members and tweet photos back to Earth automatically, when it launches in 2013. Engineers at the University of Massachusetts Amherst developed the MARC 5.0 robot with RFID tracking to inventory laboratory assets and identify nearby personnel. It automatically tweets when personnel with proper identification badges come within close proximity of its location in an assigned room. For environmental monitoring applications in harsh environments, researchers at the University of South Florida College of Marine Science deploy a solar-powered autonomous underwater vehicle (SAUV) to tweet water-quality data from its on-board sensors via long-range radio communications. Its Twitter feed is interspersed with periodic interjections by a human operator.

== In business ==
Twitter is increasingly being used as a business promotional tool. Twitter encourages this through "Twitter 101", a web-based tutorial aimed at business users. For example, one of the notable business Twitter users is Dell, which reported $9m of its 2009 sales coming directly through Twitter and Facebook combined. It has been argued that smaller businesses also benefit from using Twitter, since they can compete on equal terms with larger businesses within the Twitter platform. In the UK, a survey indicated that 17% of small British businesses were using Twitter, mainly to attract new customers.

Small businesses can employ evangelists using a variety of techniques to reach more followers, and sometimes produce industry leaders. Ford has elevated their global head of social media, Scott Monty, into the public spotlight as an evangelist of the use of technology in the automotive industry. Robert Scoble has kept his own company, Rackspace in the public eye and maintained his own publicity primarily through Twitter.

However, increased use of social networking sites has provoked concern about privacy in the workplace, and the protection of company data. A survey of 1,400 chief information officers also revealed concerns about the potential for employee distraction, if they were given unlimited access to social networking sites such as Twitter.

Twitter started showing advertising to users on April 13, 2010, in the company's first significant attempt to turn its microblogging service into a profitable business.

== In terror recruiting ==
In a 2015 European Foundation for Democracy–European Policy Centre policy dialogue panel in Brussels, Mark Wallace, CEO of the "Counter Extremism Project" and former U.S. ambassador to the United Nations, said: "Twitter is currently the 'gateway drug' for those seeking to recruit fighters for Islamic terrorism and this must be stopped."

== In fundraising ==
Fundraising campaigns have been held on Twitter, where users are encouraged to tweet about and donate to a particular cause for a specified period of time. This is sometimes known as a "Tweet-a-thon", which is a portmanteau of the words "tweet" and "marathon".

Scott Stratten, author of UnMarketing: Stop Marketing, Start Engaging, started the 12for12K tweet-a-thon along with Danny Brown, founder of the 12for12K organization. 12for12K is an organization that combines social media and raising funds to impact and change the lives of millions worldwide. It first began in 2009 and uses social media platforms to run events for different charity each month to meet their goal of $12,000 within a twelve-hour time frame. In order to participate, one follows the #12for12K hashtag and re-tweets about the tweet-a-thon. For every twelve dollars donated, one is entered into a raffle with varying prizes. One hundred percent of the donation is given to the specified charity. In result, Stratten started a tweet-a-thon for the charity Share Our Strength. He was able to raise $12,000 within five and half hours of the twelve-hour period. In the end of the twelve-hour period he was able to raise $15,500. During the tweet-a-thon, traffic for 12for12K.org increased by 4,000%. On the website a Twitter avatar frame helped bring in 3,600 followers. In 2009, 12for12K.org raised $91,275 for Share Our Strength and several other charities.

The UK non-profit sector used Twitter to update supporters and potential donors when user BigDaveSB used hashtag "#charitytuesday", for which he later shared in a Justgiving Award 2010 for innovative fundraising, using Twitter to keep supporters up to date with regard to progress in a charity jailbreak.

Sue Black and others have used Twitter and other social media to raise the profile and funding for Bletchley Park.

In June 2010, Onlineshoes.com and Saucony collaborated to raise awareness and funds for childhood obesity through a tweet-a-thon. For every tweet, Onlineshoes.com donated a dollar to Saucony's "Run for Good" program, a grant program for encouraging active and healthy lifestyles for children.

== In journalism ==
=== Reporting of current events ===
In September 2010, Twitter was a key stream of communication by the media inside a Connecticut courtroom during the Cheshire, Connecticut, home invasion murders trial.

While video cameras were not allowed, Connecticut State Supreme Court Judge Jon C. Blue allowed electronic devices for text transmission during the Stephen Hayes trial. Hayes was convicted of the murders of Jennifer Hawke-Petit and her daughters Hayley and Michaela and sentenced to death. His alleged accomplice, Joshua Komisarjevsky, is scheduled to stand trial for the murders in February 2011.

While a few news organizations in other parts of the country have live blogged for years, this was the first high-profile case in Connecticut in which Twitter played an important role in keeping those interested in the court proceedings updated with information from the courtroom with the use of Twitter.

A second notable example was news organisations—including ABC News, CNN, BBC, ITV, and BSkyB—using Twitter during the Royal Wedding of Prince William and Kate Middleton in April 2011. ABC News' Tweet tracker was shown on screen, with total Tweets about the royal wedding as well as Tweets per minute.

A Pew Research study indicated, however, that the vast majority of news outlets (93%) use Twitter as a means of promoting their sites vs sharing other relevant news and stories.

In April 2013 the Associated Press' Twitter account was briefly hacked into, sending out a message that U.S. president Barack Obama had been injured in an attack on the White House. Stocks lost $134 billion in value almost instantly, before recovering in value when it was discovered the report was false.

=== Reporting of entertainment news ===
Twitter is also used by many celebrities and others in the entertainment industry (news magazines, journalists, entertainment news shows, etc...) as a way to personally connect with fans, promote projects, and break news. Celebrity tweets are often subjects of headline news and sometimes used by the mainstream media and several news outlets as a primary source for confirming information pertaining to a particular story about a celebrity. CNN Breaking News, E! Online, Perez Hilton, and People magazine are a few entertainment news outlets that have millions of Twitter followers. In June 2010, 24-year-old actress Amanda Bynes shocked the entertainment industry by announcing her retirement via Twitter. She tweeted "I don't love acting anymore so I've stopped doing it." However, a month later, Bynes announced to her followers that she had "unretired." Various news sources reported on this story, breaking the news directly from the actress's Twitter page. During the 83rd Academy Awards there were 1,269,970 tweets related to the event.

=== Conducting interviews ===
Twitter can be used to host interviews, referred to as a Twitterview. It is a type of interview for which the medium restricts the interviewer and interviewee to short-form responses. The concise style of this form of interview encourages participants to be more direct with their statements. Unlike traditional interviews, a Twitterview allows the public to join in on the conversation and become participants themselves. It is typically conducted with a reliance on hashtags, marking the subject, so that online browsers may collectively search, view and track the ongoing dialogue.

Although some sources say ABC News Correspondent George Stephanopoulos is credited with conducting the first official Twitterview in March 2009, when he spoke with Senator John McCain, the truth is there had been twitterviews with such name before. One of the first was conducted in English and later translated to Spanish by Alain Ochoa at Diariomedico.com—a Spanish healthcare news site—when he spoke to blogger Bertalan Meskó on December 10, 2008. Another earlier Twitterview was hosted by a blogger named Carl Ocab interviewing John Chow.

Music blogger Derek Michael Sheldon from The World As I Der See It! created the first pictorial transformation of the twitterview in an article with music artist Jann Arden. Sheldon transformed the interview platform to an easy to read visual presentation utilizing images of the actual Twitter timeline feed. He continues to be the leading blogger to use the Twitterview format with musicians.

== In entertainment ==
=== Sports ===
Sportspeople, teams, promoters and sponsors have used Twitter to communicate with fans. Twitter allows to direct communication, letting sportspeople themselves reply to comments by fans and show them their everyday life. Some team mascots even have accounts: Butler Blue, the mascot of Butler University, and Pork Chop, the old Dallara chassis that IndyCar driver Simona de Silvestro used in 2011.

In 2009, IndyCar Series team Vision Racing began using a Twitter account to post reports throughout race weekends. That year, teams, track owners and fans started to organize tweetups. By 2010, most IndyCar drivers and teams had their own Twitter account.

At the 2012 Daytona 500 NASCAR Cup Series race, Brad Keselowski tweeted while driving behind the pace car, posting a picture of a jet dryer truck burning after being hit by another car. The driver tripled his Twitter followers from 60,000 to 200,000 in a few days after the race.

Dallas Mavericks owner Mark Cuban has used Twitter to criticize National Basketball Association officiating; he was fined $50,000 by the league in January 2013 after tweeting "I've tried for 13 years to fix the officiating in this league and I have failed miserably."

=== Television ===
Twitter is used by TV operators and broadcasters to try to encourage viewers to get involved. This can take the form of on-screen hashtags, having celebrities tweet while a show airs, or contests around a TV show. Notable examples include Comedy Central using Twitter hashtags during the Comedy Awards and BBC QuestionTime encouraging political debate. During the 2011 Oscars, there were over 10,000 tweets per minute—with the event racking up 1.8 million tweets overall. During the 2011 Super Bowl, tweets peaked at 4,000 per second. In the UK, daily television shows also receive attention on Twitter, although the levels of activity is lower than a major TV event like the Oscars.

However, it is unclear if integrating Twitter-based strategies into broadcasting impacts TV ratings.

=== Pranks ===
American Duke basketball player Jon Scheyer played a prank after his team won the 2010 NCAA basketball championship in April 2010. He tweeted his more than 6,700 Twitter followers to call him on a fake phone number, which belonged to his former high school teammate Zach Kelly. For example, Sports Illustrated was taken in by the ruse. After Kelly had received more than 2,000 text messages and several hundred calls, Scheyer tweeted his fans to stop texting and calling his friend.

In 2010, a rumor spread via Twitter that teen celebrity Justin Bieber had died. Hashtag "#JustinBieber" remained a Trending Topic for many months until Twitter changed their formula to show newer topics more prominently; however, this resulted in fans creating new hashtags to get around the solution.

== Oldest user ==
At the age of 104, Ivy Bean of Bradford, England was the oldest user of the website. She quickly became more widely known, and several fan pages were made in her honour. At the time of her death, she had 4,962 friends on Facebook and more than 56,000 followers on Twitter. Her death was widely reported in the media and she received tributes from several notable media personalities.

== See also ==
- Black Twitter
