= NASA Social =

NASA-hosted events for social media influencers

NASA has hosted many events for its social media enthusiasts called NASA Socials (formerly NASA Tweetups) beginning in 2009. These events are targeted at the social media followers of NASA through platforms such as Twitter, Facebook, Google Plus, Instagram, YouTube and more. They provide guests with VIP access to NASA facilities and speakers with the goal of leveraging participants' social networks to further the outreach requirements of NASA as laid out in the National Aeronautics and Space Act. NASA re-branded these events as "Socials" in March 2012 as it expanded participation to services beyond just Twitter.

As of 2015, all NASA field centers and NASA Headquarters have hosted NASA Tweetup/Social events. There were 5 NASA Tweetups in 2009, 10 in 2010, 16 in 2011, 21 in 2012, 22 in 2013, and 23 in 2014. In August 2011, over 2,000 participants had been part of official NASA Tweetups. By July 2014, that number had swelled to over 6,000 total participants in over 5 years of NASA Social programs.

Many NASA Social events are at least partially broadcast on NASA TV and UStream. NASA Socials are held at NASA centers, NASA Headquarters, observatories, engine test sites, museums such as the Newseum and National Air and Space Museum, and during larger events such as SXSW and World Space Week. The length of socials range from a few hours to a couple days to much longer in the case of some events, such as the STS-133 launch tweetup.

== History ==
The first NASA Tweetup was held at the Jet Propulsion Laboratory in Pasadena, California, in January 2009. During this event, guests were given exclusive tours and access to JPL scientists and engineers.|

In an attempt to measure the impact of tweetups, NASA tracked 10,665 tweets originating from 150 participants in the August 2011 Juno Tweetup as well as the subsequent retweets and found 29.9 million potential impressions.

== Speakers and participants ==
Speakers at NASA tweetup/social events have included NASA engineers, scientists, executives and well over 80 NASA astronauts. Notable speakers include NASA Administrator Charles Bolden, SpaceX President Gwynne Shotwell, Senator and astronaut John Glenn, Bill Nye, and final Space Shuttle crew members Sandy Magnus and Chris Ferguson.

While the majority of participants in NASA tweetups/socials have been space enthusiasts, there have also been many "celebrity" participants, including Neil deGrasse Tyson, LeVar Burton, Trey Ratcliff, Robert Scoble, Bill Prady, Kevin Clash, Miles O'Brien, Seth Green, will.i.am, and many others.

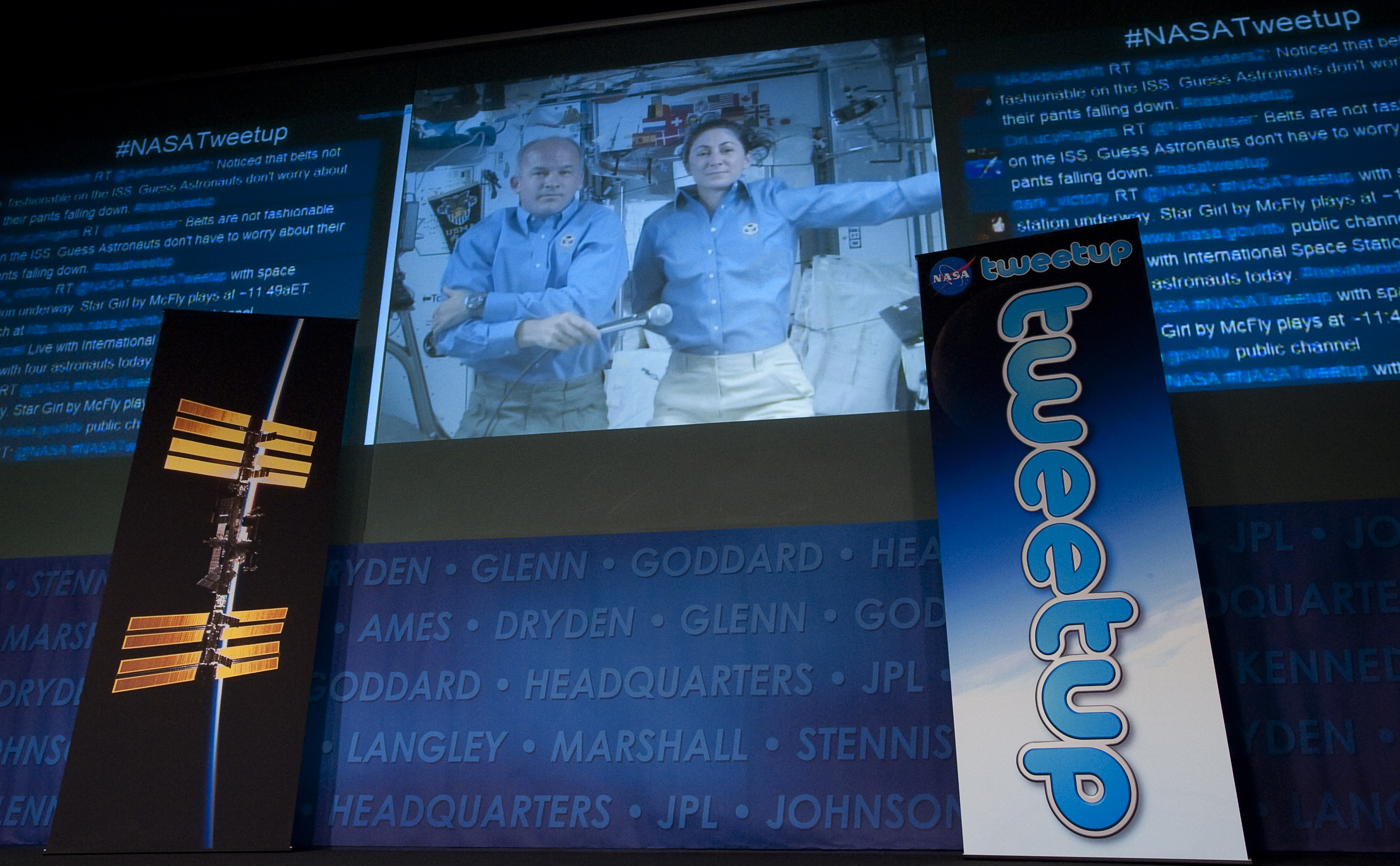
Tweetup with ISS Astronauts in 2009

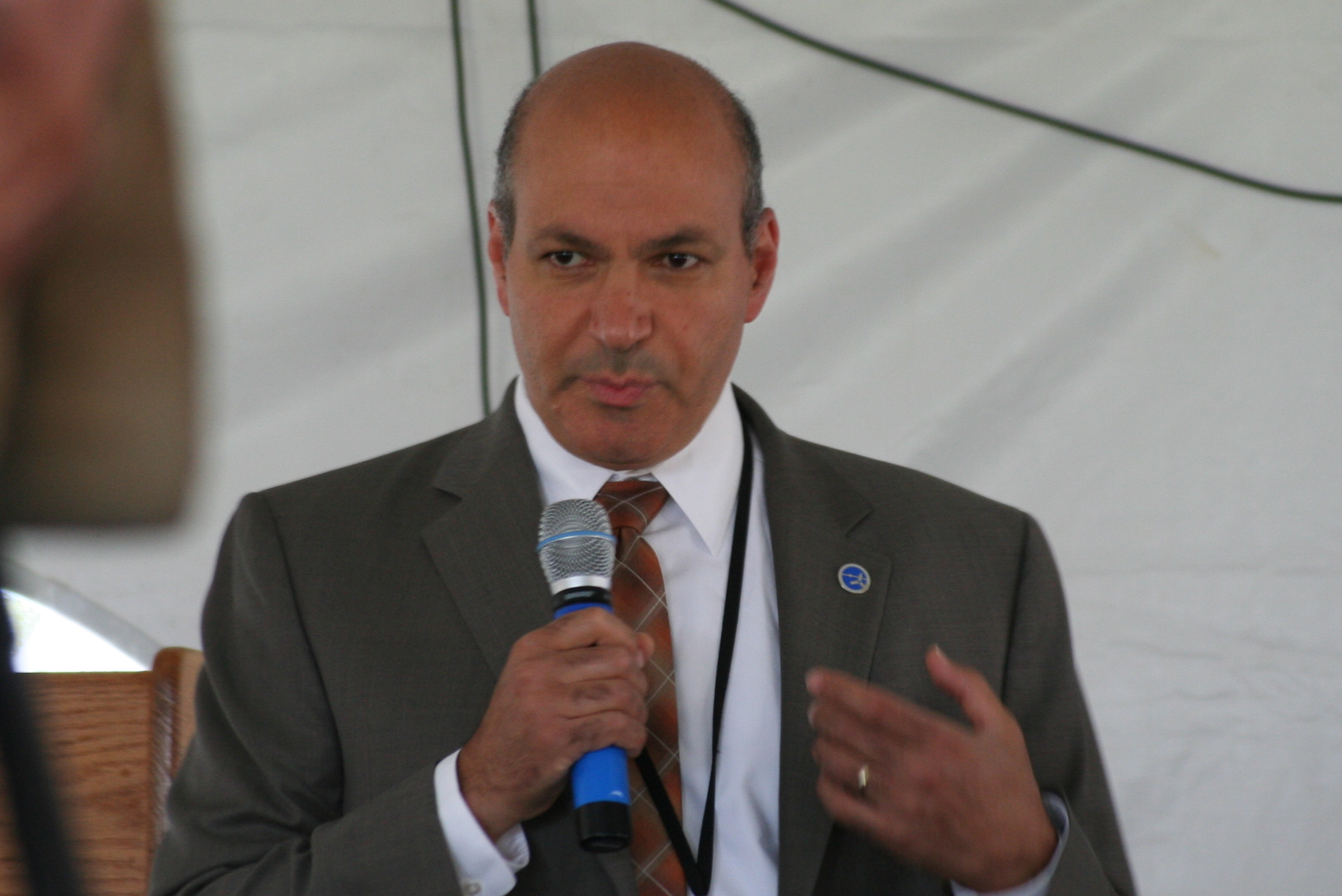
Former NASA Chief Scientist Waleed Abdalati speaking at the Juno Tweetup

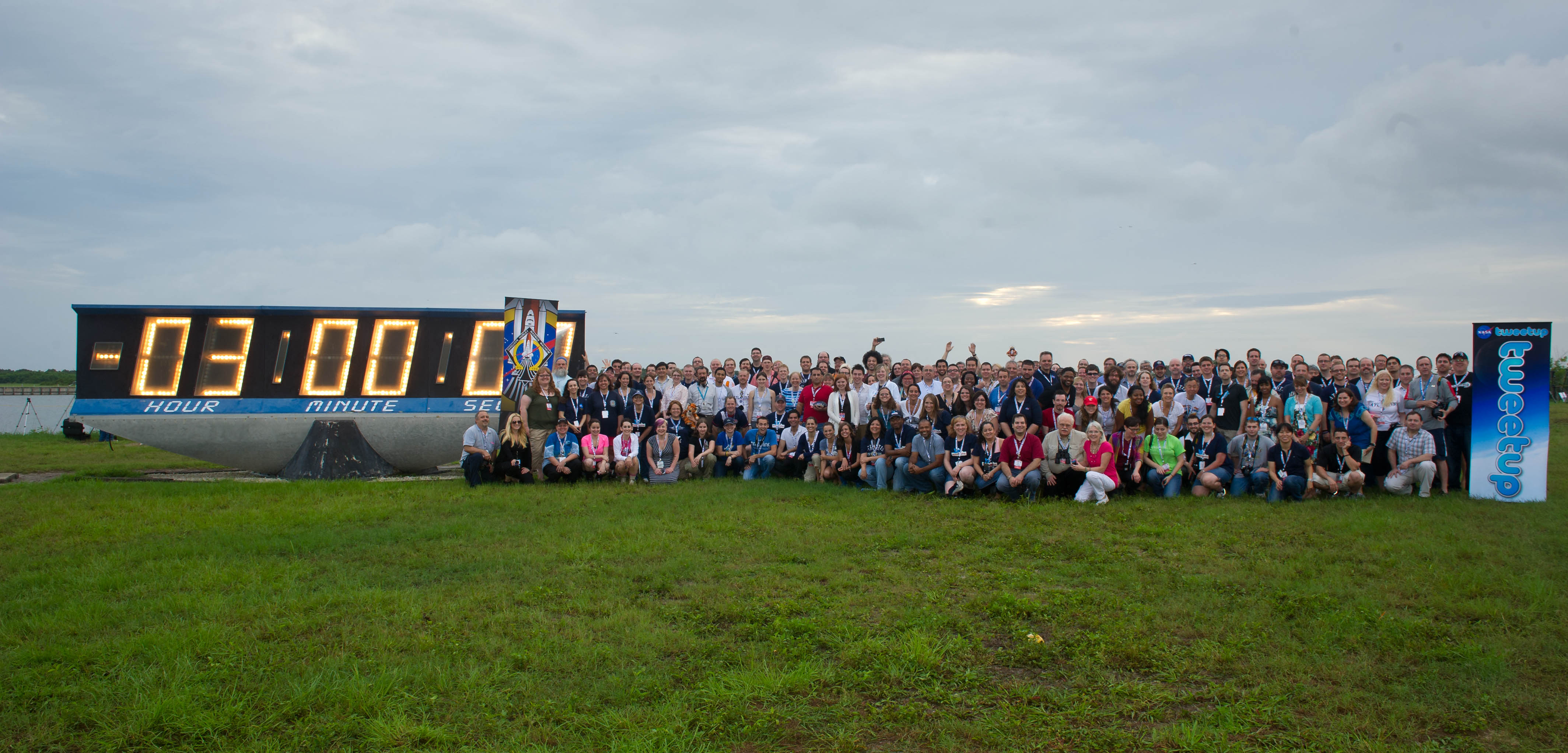
Group picture in front of Countdown clock of STS-135 Tweetup participants

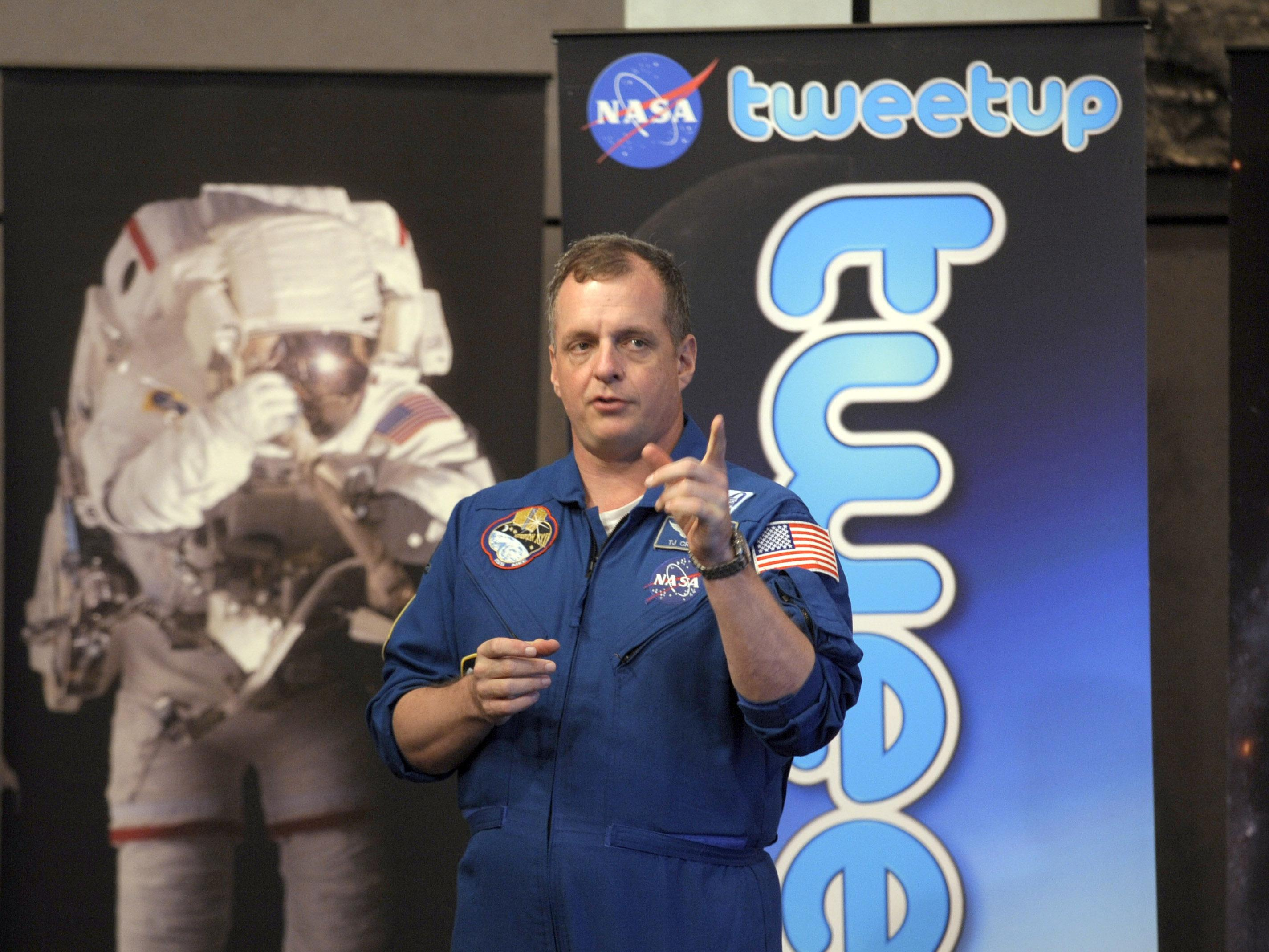
Astronaut TJ Creamer speaks to tweetup participants in July 2010 at NASA Headquarters

== List of NASA Socials and Tweetups ==
#	Date	Event	Location	Official speakers	Notes	Attendees
120	February 1, 2017	JSC #SpaceBowl #SB51 Behind the Scenes at JSC Social	Johnson Space Center	Astronaut, NASA experts are scheduled		50
117	April 29, 2016	OSIRIS-REx Preview Social	Lockheed Martin Space Systems	To Be Added		25
116	April 7–8, 2016	SpaceX CRS-8	KSC	To Be Added		50
115	March 21–22, 2016	Cygnus CRS Orb-6 Launch Social	KSC	To Be Added		50
114	February 9, 2016	State of NASA Multi-Center Social	10 NASA Field Centers	To Be Added		12-40 each
113	January 25, 2016	James Webb Space Telescope Mirror Installation Social	GSFC	To Be Added		Unk
112	December 2–3, 2015	Cygnus CRS Orb-4 Launch Social	KSC	To Be Added		50
111	November 11, 2015	NASA DC-8 & OLYMPEX #EarthRightNow Social	University of Washington in Seattle	To be Added		40
110	August 13, 2015	#SLSfiredup RS-25 Engine Hot Fire Test Social	Stennis (SSC)	To Be Added		40
???	Launch Postponed	Jason-3 Launch Social	Vandenberg Air Force Base (VAFB)	To Be Added		70
109	June 28, 2015	SpaceX CRS-7 Launch Social	KSC	To Be Added		50
108	June 15–16, 2015	#AbSciCon 2015 Astrobiology Science Conference Social	Hilton Chicago, Chicago, Illinois	To Be Added		20
107	June 6, 2015	New Horizons #PlutoFlyby Multi-Site Social	Two locations: Applied Physics Laboratory (APL), Laurel Maryland & Lowell Observatory, Flagstaff, Arizona	James L. Green, Alan Stern		Unk
106	May 12, 2015	Leading Edge Asynchronous Propeller Technology (LEAPTech) #FlyNASA Social	Armstrong Flight Research Center (AFRC)	To Be Added		50
105	April 23, 2015	#Hubble25 Social - Celebrating 25 Years of the Hubble Space Telescope	Newseum in DC & Goddard (GSFC) in Greenbelt, MD	To Be Added		50
104	April 14, 2015	SpaceX CRS-6 Launch Social	KSC	To Be Added		50
103	March 13, 2015	Magnetospheric Multiscale (MMS) Launch Social	KSC	To Be Added		50
102	March 10–11, 2015	#SLSfiredup SLS Booster Hot Fire Test Social	Orbital ATK's test facilities in Promontory, Utah	To Be Added		45
101	February 2, 2015	State of NASA Multi-Center Social	Ames (Ames), Armstrong Flight Research Center, Glenn (GRC), Goddard (GSFC), JPL, JSC, KSC, LaRC, MSFC, & Stennis (SSC)	To Be Added		10 (Ames), AFRS (40), 25 (GRC), 25 (GSFC), JPL (10), JSC (20), KSC (40), 25 (LaRC), 15 (MSFC), & 25 (SSC)
100	January 28–31, 2015	Soil Moisture Active Passive (SMAP) Launch Social	Vandenberg Air Force Base (VAFB)	To Be Added		70
99	January 15, 2015	#ISS1Year Social Social with Astronaut Scott Kelly	JSC	Astronaut Scott Kelly (@StationCDRKelly), Michael Suffredini (ISS Program Manager) - crew news conference		20
98	January 10, 2015	SpaceX CRS-5 Launch Social	KSC	To Be Added		50
97	December 3–4, 2014	Orion Exploration Flight Test 1 (EFT-1) Social	KSC	To Be Added		150
96	December 3, 2014	Multi-Center Social to Preview Orion EFT-1	Ames (Ames), Glenn (GRC), Goddard (GSFC), JPL, JSC, LaRC, MSFC, & Stennis (SSC)	To Be Added		25 (ARC), 50 (GRC), 25 (GSFC), 40 (JPL), 30 (JSC), 30 (LaRC), 30 (MSFC), & 25 (SSC)
95	November 18–19, 2014	#FlyNASA Social	Armstrong Flight Research Center in Edwards, California	To Be Added		30
94	October 19–20, 2014	Cygnus CRS Orb-3 Launch Social	Mid-Atlantic Regional Spaceport at Wallops	To Be Added		50
93	October 17, 2014	Magnetospheric Multiscale (MMS) Preview Social	Goddard (GSFC)	Craig Pollock, Thomas Moore, Jeffrey Newmark, C. Alex Young, Michael Hesse, Yari Collado-Vega, Carmine Mattiello		25
92	October 13, 2014	#MarsComet Social	JPL	To Be Added		50
91	September 21, 2014	Mars Atmosphere and Volatile Evolution (MAVEN) Social	Lockheed Martin in Denver, Colorado	Speakers from NASA, Lockheed Martin and the University of Colorado Laboratory for Atmospheric and Space Physics (LASP) - To Be Added		25
90	September 18–19, 2014	SpaceX CRS-4 Launch Social	KSC	To Be Added		50
89	September 12, 2014	Space Launch System (SLS) & (#WeldingWonder) Social	Michoud Assembly Facility (MAF) & Stennis Space Center	To Be Added	First Michoud Social	25
88	July 21, 2014	45th Anniversary of Apollo 11 (#Apollo45) Social - KSC	KSC	KSC Director Bob Cabana, Astronauts Michael Collins, Buzz Aldrin, Jim Lovell		25
87	July 19, 2014	45th Anniversary of Apollo 11 (#Apollo45) Social - Virginia	Wolf Trap National Park for the Performing Arts in Virginia	Astronaut Buzz Aldrin, National Symphony Orchestra & Emil de Cou, Bob Jacobs (NASA HQ)	Only Social with a live symphony performance	25
86	June 30-July 1, 2014	OCO-2 Launch Social	Vandenberg Air Force Base (VAFB)	To Be Added		70
85	June 17–19, 2014	#ISSRDC Social Media Accreditation for 2014 ISS Research & Development Conference	Denver, Colorado	NASA Associate Administrator for Human Exploration and Operations William Gerstenmaier, NASA Chief Scientist Waleed Abdalati, International Space Station Program Manager Michael Suffredini, Astronaut Ron Garan (@Astro_Ron)		6 (in social)
84	June 10, 2014	Photography Social for Cygnus CRS Orb-2 Launch	Mid-Atlantic Regional Spaceport (MARS) at Wallops	To Be Added		50
83	May 20, 2014	Alternative Fuels & Aeronautics Social	Armstrong (formerly Dryden/DFRC)	To Be Added	First Social since the name change from Dryden Flight Research Center	50
82	April 1–2, 2014	50 Years of Deep Space Network Social	JPL	To Be Added		50
81	March 24, 2014	@AstroKarenN Kid-Friendly Social	NASA HQ	Astronaut Karen Nyberg (@AstroKarenN)	First Social billed as "kid-friendly" Social	100
80	March 15–16, 2014	SpaceX CRS-3 Launch Social	KSC	To Be Added		50
79	March 4, 2014	FY2015 NASA Budget Social	Goddard (GSFC)	Charles Bolden (NASA Administrator), John Grunsfeld (NASA HQ)	Social canceled due to weather converting the briefing to a teleconference	20
78	February 27, 2014	GPM Photo Social	Goddard (GSFC)	To Be Added		15
77	January 23, 2014	TDRS-L Launch Social	CCAFS / KSC	To Be Added		50
76	January 22, 2014	James Webb Space Telescope Social	Goddard (GSFC)	To Be Added		40
75	January 8, 2014	Orbital-1 Antares Launch Social	Mid-Atlantic Regional Spaceport (MARS) at Wallops	To Be Added		50
74	December 10, 2013	2013 AGU Social	Moscone Center	NASA Chief Scientist Ellen Stofan, NASA's Associate Administrator for Science and veteran astronaut John Grunsfeld and more.		20
73	November 16 & 18, 2013	MAVEN Launch Social	CCAFS / KSC	NASA's Planetary Science Chief Jim Green, program executive Lisa May, program scientist Kelley Fast, deputy project manager Sandra Cauffman, system design lead with Lockheed Martin Chris Waters, NASA Chief Scientist Ellen Stofan, NASA's Associate Administrator for Science and veteran astronaut John Grunsfeld, astronaut Wendy Lawrence, Bill Nye, NASA Administrator Charlie Bolden and Kennedy Space Center Director Bob Cabana.		150
72	November 4–5, 2013	JPL Earth Science Social	JPL	To Be Added		100
71	September 17, 2013	Antares Launch Social	Mid-Atlantic Regional Spaceport at Wallops	To Be Added		50
70	September 5–6, 2013	LADEE Launch to Moon Social	Mid-Atlantic Regional Spaceport (MARS) at Wallops	John Grunsfeld(NASA HQ), Charles Bolden(NASA Administrator), Bob Barber(NASA Ames), Tony Colaprete(NASA Ames) ... More To Be Added		50
69	August 21, 2013	Major Airborne Field Campaign Social	EFD	To Be Added		15
68	August 14–15, 2013	Orion Stationary Recovery Test Social	LaRC	Personnel from Naval Station Norfolk, among others		30
67	July 17, 2013	Astronaut Health, Fitness & Rehabilitation Social	JSC	To Be Added		30
66	June 7–8, 2013	Centennial Challenge Sample Return Robot Social	WPI	To Be Added	First Social at WPI	20
65	May 30, 2013	Going Operational - Landsat 8 Social	USGS EROS Center	To Be Added	First Social with the USGS	30
64	May 22, 2013	ISS Research Social at JSC	JSC	To Be Added		30
63	April 25–27, 2013	Great Moonbuggy Race NASA Social	USSRC & MSFC	To Be Added	First Social at MSFC	50
62	April 15–17, 2013	Antares Launch Social	Mid-Atlantic Regional Spaceport at Wallops	To Be Added		25
61	April 12, 2013	JAXA-NASA Cherry Blossoms Social	Goddard (GSFC)	Ramesh Kakar, NASA Earth Sciences; Gail Skofronick Jackson, NASA GPM; Riko Oki, JAXA GPM; Ardeshir Azarbarzin, NASA GPM; Masahiro Kojima, JAXA GPM; Peter Hildeband, NASA Goddard Earth Sciences; Don Figgins, Ball Aerospace; Compton Tucker, NASA Earth Sciences; Dawn Myers, NASA Goddard Solar Science; Horace Mitchell, NASA Goddard Scientific Visualization Studio; Ben Reed, Robotic Refueling Mission; Jason Dworkin, Astrobiology Analytical Lab and OSIRIS-REx; Ed Packard and Janet Thomas, Satellite Integration and Testing; Craig Pollock, MMS; and Paul Geithner, JWST		60
60	March 19, 2013	ISS Social at JSC	JSC	To Be Added		30
59	March 10, 2013	NASA Social at SXSW Interactive	Austin, Texas	To Be Added	First NASA Social at SXSW	20
58	February 28 & March 1, 2013	SpaceX CRS-2 Launch Social	KSC	To Be Added		50
57	February 20, 2013	Science on the ISS Social	NASA HQ & Steven F. Udvar-Hazy Center	William Gerstenmaier, Tara Ruttley, Tom Marshburn, Kevin Ford, Chris Hatfield, Marshall Poterfield		150
56	February 10–11, 2013	Landsat Data Continuity Mission Launch Social	VAFB	To Be Added		80
55	January 29–30, 2013	TDRS-K Launch Social	CCAFS	To Be Added		60
54	January 25, 2013	NASA Airborne Earth Science Event at Dryden Social	Dryden (DFRC)	To Be Added		50
53	January 18, 2013	NASA Open House Social	NASA HQ	To Be Added		75
52	December 4, 2012	AGU Social	Moscone Center	To Be Added		20
51	December 4, 2012	@AstroAcaba Social	NASA HQ	Astronaut Joe Acaba		150
50	November 1–2, 2012	Atlantis Social	KSCVC	To Be Added		45
49	October 15, 2012	Goldstone DSN Social	Goldstone DSN	To Be Added	First Goldstone Social	65
48	October 7, 2012	SpaceX CRS-1 Launch Social	KSC	NASA Administrator Charles Bolden; SpaceX President Gwynne Shotwell	First Media Accreditation for Social Media	50
47	September 19–20, 2012	Dryden Endeavour Social	Dryden (DFRC)	To Be Added		40
46	August 22–23, 2012	Radiation Belt Storm Probes Launch Social	KSC	David Sibeck, NASA Living with a Star Mission Scientist, Nicky Fox, Radiation Belt Storm Probes (RBSP) Deputy Project Scientist, Dave "Kouch" Kusnierkiewiczm Space Dept. Chief Engineer JHU/APL, Aly Mendoza-Hill, Mission Manager NASA Launch Services Program. Astronaut Leland Melvin, Associate Administrator for Education NASA HQ, Charles Bolden, NASA Administrator. Kurt Lindstrom, Civil Space Business Area Executive JHU/APL		50
45	August 2–3, 2012	KSC 50th Anniversary Social	KSC	Caley Burke @RocketCaley (NASA LSP), Si Song (ULA)	First Multi-Site Social	50
44	August 3, 2012	Ames Mars Curiosity Social	Ames (ARC)	Danny Skarka @dannyskarka	First Multi-Site Social	20
43	August 3, 2012	Glenn Mars Curiosity Social	Glenn (GRC)	To Be Added	First Multi-Site Social	30
42	August 3, 2012	Goddard Mars Curiosity Social	Goddard (GSFC)	Jason Dworkin, Astrobiology Analytical Lab, OSIRIS-REx; Chris Johnson & Melissa Trainer, SAM Environmental Chamber; Paul Geithner, James Webb Space Telescope; guides: Lora Bleacher, Ellen Gray, Liz Zubritsky, Rob Garner, Erin Ryan, Rupa Nune, and Aries Keck	First Multi-Site Social	20
41	August 3, 2012	JSC Mars Curiosity Social	JSC	To Be Added	First Multi-Site Social	25
40	August 3, 2012	Langley Mars Curiosity Social	Langley (LaRC)	David Bowles, Associate Site Director; Walt Engelund, Chief Engineer, Neil Cheatwood, MEDLI principal investigator; Steve Gaddis, Game Changing Program Office	First Multi-Site Social	30
39	August 3–5, 2012	Mars Curiosity Landing Social	JPL	JPL Mission Manager Arthur Amador; MSL (Mars Science Laboratory) Deputy Project Scientist Ashwin Vasavada; NASA Administrator Charles Bolden; Project Manager for Curiosity Richard Cook; JPL Director Charles Elachi; Visualization Producer for NASA JPL Doug Ellison; Former NASA Deputy Administrator Lori Garver; NASA's Science Mission Directorate John M. Grunsfeld; Curiosity rover driver and engineer at JPL Matt Heverly; Former Director of NASA's Mars Exploration Program Doug McCuistion; NASA Astronaut Leland D. Melvin; NASA JPL Curiosity Lead Engineer Adam Steltzner; JPL Director of the Engineering and Science Directorate Peter Theisinger; JPL Aerospace engineer Steve Sell; JPL Navigation and Control Systems Manager and Strategic Uplink Lead Steven Lee; JPL Aerospace Engineer Anita Sengupta; JPL Astronautics Systems Engineer Randii Wessen. Non-NASA presentations: Actress Nichelle Nichols; Entrepreneur and musician Will.i.am; TV Host Alex Trebek; Big Bang Theory co-producer Bill Prady; Actress June Lockhart; Actor Jay R. Ferguson; and Actor Wil Wheaton.	First Multi-Site Social	25
38	July 23, 2012	Landsat Social	Newseum in DC & Goddard (GSFC) in Greenbelt, MD	To Be Added		25
37	May 4, 2012	Dryden Social Social	Dryden Flight Research Center	To Be Added	First Dryden Social; sonic boom planned	75
36	May 18–19, 2012	Space X COTS 2 Social	KSC	NASA Deputy Administrator Lori Garver; SpaceX President Gwynne Shotwell; NASA Public Affairs Officer Josh Byerly; NASA Flow Director for Space Shuttle Orbiter Transition and Retirement Stephanie Stilson; NASA Administrator Charles Bolden; KSC Director Bob Cabana	First SpaceX Social	50
35	April 19, 2012	Discovery Welcome Social	Steven F. Udvar-Hazy Center	Director of National Air and Space Museum (NASM), General Jack Dailey; Secretary of NASM, Wayne Clough; NASA Administrator Charles Bolden; Senator John Glenn; France A. Córdova.	First NASA Social; First at Udvar-Hazy Center	30
34	March 2, 2012	Glenn Tweetup	Glenn (GRC)	Astronaut Gregory H. Johnson (@Astro_Box) & more.	First tweetup at Glenn	100
33	February 14, 2012	@Astro_Ron Tweetup	NASA HQ	Astronaut Ron Garan (@Astro_Ron & @FragileOasis)		150
32	February 13, 2012	NASA Budget Tweetup	NASA HQ	NASA Administrator Charles Bolden and NASA Chief Financial Officer Elizabeth Robinson		20
31	November 25 & 26, 2011	Mars Science Laboratory Launch	KSC	Astronauts Doug Wheelock (@Astro_Wheels) and Leland Melvin (@Astro_Flow), NASA Administrator Charles Bolden, Deputy Administrator Lori Garver (@Lori_Garver), Bill Nye (@TheScienceGuy), engineers from JPL, musician will.i.am (@iamwill); Also: @MarsCuriosity	Launch of the Mars Science Laboratory mission carrying the Curiosity rover	151
30	November 8, 2011	Langley Tweetup	Langley (LaRC)	Charles Harris, Director of Research, NASA Langley; Bruce Fisher, Flight Services; Mike Obland, Airborne Science; astronaut Susan Kilrain; Karen Whitley, Inflatable Lunar Habitat; Mary Beth Wusk, Hypersonic Inflatable Aerodynamic Decelerator; Amanda Cutright, Inflatable Reentry Vehicle Experiment; Roman Paryz, National Transonic Facility; Martin Annett, Landing Impact Research/Hydro Impact Basin Facility	First tweetup at Langley, Orion capsule splash test	50
29	October 27, 2011	NPP satellite (Delta II) Launch	VAFB	@NASANPP; NASA Astronaut Piers Sellers, the deputy director of the Sciences and Exploration Directorate at NASA's Goddard Space Flight Center in Greenbelt, Maryland; NPP Project Scientist Jim Gleason; NPP Systems Manager Janice Smith; NASA Launch Director Tim Dunn; Scott Asbury, a senior program manager with Ball Aerospace & Technologies, Corp. in Boulder, Colorado.	First tweetup at Vandenberg; First tweetup for a U.S. West coast launch; Launch of Earth-observing NPP satellite	20-24
28	October 21, 2011	Wallops Tweetup	Wallops (WFF)	Rebecca Powell, Joyce Winterton, Stephanie Schierholz-intro; Harold Cherrix, Ed Lagman, Rob Marshall, Cliff Murphy-NASA Sounding Rocket; Henry Cathey & Debbie Fairbrother-NASA Balloon Program; Sarah Daugherty-Range Control Center; Les Kovacs & Kate Campbell-Taurus II HIF (Orbital Sciences); Bill Wrobel-Wallops Director	First tweetup at Wallops	50
27	October 14, 2011	SOFIA Telescope/Ames Tweetup	Ames (ARC)	David Morse (@drmNASA); Pamela Marcum, SOFIA Project Scientist; Bill Thigpen, NASA Advanced Supercomputing; Steven Beard & Dean Giovannetti, Vertical Motion Simulator; Thomas Roellig, SOFIA Deputy Project Scientist; Roger Hunter, Kepler mission Also: @SOFIATelescope		50
26	October 13, 2011	STS-135 Crew (Magnus & Ferguson)	NASA HQ	Final Space Shuttle crew members Sandy Magnus (@Astro_Sandy) and Chris Ferguson (@Astro_Ferg)		150
25	September 7–8, 2011	GRAIL spacecraft (Delta II) Launch	KSC	Neil deGrasse Tyson (@neiltyson), NASA Administrator Charles Bolden, Nichelle Nichols (@RealNichelle), Jim Adams (@NASAJim), Sally Ride Science (@SallyRideSci), @VeronicaMcG (@NASAJPL), Maria Zuber, @Doug_Ellison (@NASA_Eyes), @TrentPerotto	Launch of twin lunar-bound spacecraft	150
24	August 4–5, 2011	Juno spacecraft (Atlas V Launch)	KSC	Bill Nye (@thescienceguy), @NASAJim, @VeronicaMcG (@NASAJPL), NASA Chief Scientist Waleed Abdalati, @TrentPerotto, @SteveMatousek, @Doug_Ellison (@NASA_Eyes), @CassiniSaturn, @NASA_LSP & Juno Science Team members	Launch of the Jupiter-bound Juno spacecraft	150
23	July 21, 2011	STS-135 Landing	KSC		Final landing of the Space Shuttle	50
22	July 19, 2011	STS-135 Mission	JSC	@Astro_Clay, @StationCDRKelly, @Carbon_Flight, @saroy, @mgrabois, @gnholt, @Astro_Ron (from space), NASA PAO Josh Byerly	Space Shuttle ascent, rendezvous & landing simulators, as well as the Mission Control Center and the Space Vehicle Mockup Facility	30
21	July 7–8, 2011	STS-135 Launch	KSC	Lori Garver (@Lori_Garver), Elmo, @Astro_Mike, @Astro_Wheels, @Phalanx, @ISS_NatlLab, Bill Gerstenmeier, Robert Crippen, @Astro_Ron (from space)	Final launch of the Space Shuttle	152
20	June 6, 2011	JPL Tweetup	JPL	Aquarius, GRAIL, Juno, Mars Science Laboratory / @MarsCuriosity, Dawn, @SOFIATelescope, @NASAJPL, @MarsRovers, @AsteroidWatch	A few of the tweetup attendees were also invited to attend the June 8, 2011, SOFIA Telescope Media Day at Dryden Flight Research Center.	120
19	Apr. 28–29, 2011 May 16, 2011	STS-134 Launch	KSC	@Astro_Clay @Astro_Flow, Astronaut Ricky Arnold; NASA Chief Scientist, Waleed Abdalati	The Shuttle launch was delayed, but participants were invited back for its successful May launch attempt—the final flight of Space Shuttle Endeavour.	150
18	Mar. 19, 2011	Sun-Earth Day 2011	Goddard (GSFC); NASM	Aleya Littleton, Vicky Portway (NASM); Troy Cline, Michelle Thaller (GSFC); NASA EDGE (live show broadcast) @SunEarthDay @NASA_SDO, @Camilla_SDO,	First tweetup at GSFC (see SDO is GO, #6 below)	100
17	Mar. 16, 2011	@Astro_Wheels Tweetup	NASA HQ	Expedition 25 Commander Doug Wheelock (@Astro_Wheels)	"Wheels" was the first person to check-in in space, using Foursquare	100
16	Feb. 11, 2011	Ames Planet Hunters	Ames (ARC)	@worden, @NASAKepler, David Morrison, Director of the Carl Sagan Center at SETI, @SOFIAtelescope	First tweetup at ARC	100
15	Nov. 10, 2010	STS-133 Mission	JSC	@Astro_Clay, @AstroRobonaut, Flight Director @Tungsten_Flight & PAO Rob Navias	Although STS-133 was delayed, the tweetup went on as scheduled.	19
14	Oct. 31-Nov. 5, 2010 Feb. 24, 2011	STS-133 Launch	KSC	@Astro_Ron, @Astro_Soichi, @Astro_Flow, @Astro_Bones, Shannon Walker & @AstroRobonaut	First extended tweetup Discovery's launch was delayed, but participants were invited back for successful Feb. launch attempt—the final flight of Space Shuttle Discovery.	146
13	July 29, 2010	@Astro_TJ Tweetup	NASA HQ	Expedition 22/23 Flight Engineer & Science Officer, @Astro_TJ	TJ was the first astronaut to send a live tweet from space (and set up the Station's live Internet)	100
12	June 5, 2010	World Science Festival	NYU's Kimmel Center	@Astro_Flow, @Astro_Sandy, John C. Mather, Brian Greene		73
11	May 19, 2010	STS-132 Mission	JSC	@Astro_Ron (Answered Questions by Tweet), Talat Hussain (Boeing - Presented on TDRS), Ellen Ochoa, Deputy JSC Director and Former Astronaut, @Astro_Jeff		82
10	May 13–14, 2010	STS-132 Launch	KSC	@Bobby_Braun, @Lori_Garver, @Rocky_Sci, astronauts Dave Wolf & Janice Voss	2nd Tweetup at a Shuttle Atlantis launch	143
9	May 3, 2010	SDO First Light	DC - Newseum	Dean Pesnell, SDO project scientist, NASA GSFC; Madhulika Guhathakurta, SDO program scientist, NASA HQ	Hosted by Goddard Space Flight Center.	16
8	April 18, 2010	Earth Day - 40th	DC - National Mall	James Balog, Rob Simmon, Compton Tucker		40
7	Feb 17, 2010	STS-130 Mission	JSC	@Astro_Bones/@ZeroG_MD	First tweetup at JSC	100
6	Feb 11, 2010	"SDO is Go" Launch	KSC		First launch tweetup for uncrewed vehicle Organized by GSFC	15 35 (GSFC)
5	Nov 15–16, 2009	STS-129 Launch	KSC	@Astro_Mike, Scott Kelly (@StationCDRKelly), Jon Cowart (@Rocky_Sci), @MarsPhoenix's @VeronicaMcG, Miles O'Brien, Wayne Hale	First tweetup at KSC; First Shuttle launch tweetup First 2-day event	101
4	Oct. 21, 2009	ISS Crew	NASA HQ	@Astro_Nicole & @Astro_Jeff aboard ISS	First tweetup featuring live downlink from ISS Link with ISS was cut short due to a false alarm aboard Station during tweetup.	24
3	Sept. 24, 2009	STS-127 Crew	NASA HQ	@Astro_127 & the rest of STS-127 crew		58
2	July 21, 2009	STS-125 Crew	NASA HQ	@Astro_Mike & rest of STS-125 crew	First tweetup at NASA HQ	120
1	Jan. 21, 2009	JPL Tweetup	JPL	@MarsPhoenix's @VeronicaMcG	First NASA tweetup First tweetup at JPL	130

== Awards ==
1. 2009 Shorty Awards for science for updates on the Mars Phoenix Lander
2. Space Foundation's 2012 Douglas S. Morrow Public Outreach Award
3. 2012 Shorty Awards for best social media manager to NASA's Stephanie Schierholz
4. 2012 and 2013 Shorty Awards for best government use of social media.
5. Space Flight Awareness Award
6. NASA Exceptional Service Medal
7. NASA Group Achievement Award

== Cultural references ==
In the 2015 film The Martian, Donald Glover's character Rich Purnell, a NASA Jet Propulsion Laboratory employee, wore a #NASASocial lanyard. This lanyard was frequently given out to NASA Social participants and NASA employees who supported the events. Per Veronica McGregor, NASA JPL News/Social Media Manager, "when the producers came to @NASAJPL for film research, [Stephanie L. Smith, NASA JPL Digital & Social Media Supervisor,] slipped the #NASASocial lanyards into their swag bags. :)"
