= The Hawkeye Initiative =

Satirical Tumblr page

- Website type: Tumblr
- Available in: English
- Owner: Skjaldmeyja (Note: Internet pseudonym)
- Website: thehawkeyeinitiative.tumblr.com
- Commercial: No
- Registration: None
- Launched: December 2012
- Current status: Active (offline as of Dec. 5 2018)

The Hawkeye Initiative is a satirical Tumblr page similar to Women in Refrigerators that comments on the depiction and treatment of female characters and superheroes in comic books. The site features fan art of Marvel character Clint Barton / Hawkeye in various poses held by female characters that the artists believe to be impossible or sexually provocative. The site's intent is phrased as "to draw attention to how deformed, hypersexualized, and unrealistically dressed women are drawn in comics". The site further states that these poses are considered normal and often go unnoticed by many readers when performed by female superheroes.

== Origins ==
A series of commentators had discussed the absurdity of the "Strong Female Superhero Pose" in 2011–2012, with some photographic gender-swapped recreations produced. The Hawkeye initiative page lists four blog posts on its 'Origins' page, including the suggestion of the specific formula by comic artist ND Stevenson in late 2012. The first such gender-swapped image was drawn by the comic artist Blue. The reason behind choosing Hawkeye in particular (though in cases of poses that involve more than one female character, Captain America and other well-known Avengers are also used) is due to the fact that Blue's first example involved swapping Black Widow and Hawkeye on the cover of the eponymous comic.

Stevenson and Blue then asked other artists to do the same.

The Hawkeye Initiative website followed soon after, created and maintained by Skjaldmeyja. On December 5, 2018, the website's domain name expired, with the blog still accessible under thehawkeyeinitiative.tumblr.com address.

== Critical reception ==
In December 2012, The Daily Dot called ND Stevenson one of the "top 10 most influential fans of 2012" for his work in the Hawkeye Initiative.

== Reception ==
Reception towards the website has been mixed. A few readers have criticized the site while others such as Gail Simone have openly supported the site as "the best thing in the history of historical anything ever in the universe or elsewhere". The A.V. Club commented that although the choice of Hawkeye was arbitrary, "making him the face of a feminist comic-book project fits with the character Matt Fraction has established in this series."

The site's detractors have commented that some of the images are counterproductive to the site's intent. People have argued that the images "miss the mark" by being played more for laughs or by being drawn sexy "for kicks", which may make it even harder for people to understand that the issue goes deeper than humor.

== See also ==
- Portrayal of women in American comics
- Feminist Hulk
