= Arkunir =

French internet personality (2002-)

- Born: Florian; August 25, 2002 (age 23)
- Occupations: Twitch streamer, Twitter user, community manager
- Years active: 2020-present
- Known for: Ratioed Elon Musk 2 times in 2022

Florian (born August 25, 2002), known online as Arkunir, is a French Twitter user, streamer, and Internet phenomenon.

He achieved notoriety in November 2022 after he received twice as many likes as Elon Musk on Twitter by replying to his tweets.

== Online presence ==
On July 17, 2021, he offered to make a video in which he travels the world on Google Maps if he received a response from French President Emmanuel Macron. On July 20, 2021, he received his answer in a tweet: "Banco". He ratioed Emmanuel Macron's tweet, replying, "Merci monsieur le président! But ratio now". He garnered 77,000 likes versus 38,000 likes for Emmanuel Macron.

The stream began on September 24, 2021. During the 126-hour stream, he raised 47,500 euros for the Fondation 30 Millions d'Amis and covered 24,000 kilometers. On September 30, 2021, Emmanuel Macron congratulated him in a private message.

In January 2022, his Twitter account was the only account followed by the official Twitter account.

In June 2022, he challenged Burger King to let him sell his own burger. The community manager of the Burger King France account responded, asking for 100,000 retweets on his tweet. On September 13, 2022, Burger King launched the Arkunir Burger. Marketing was discontinued on September 26, 2022.

On November 7, 2022, he ratioed a tweet from Elon Musk, then-recent CEO of Twitter. In the tweet, Elon Musk writes: "What do you call someone who is a master provocateur?" Arkunir replied, "I don't know, but call it ratio". A few hours later, Elon Musk deleted his tweet after his tweet got 82,400 likes against Arkunir's 83,400 likes.

The next day, he ratioed it again with this tweet: "Where are you going? Get a ratio again and don't delete this time" in response to his tweet: "Twitter is the worst, but also the best". His tweet got over 600,000 likes and over 70,000 retweets, compared with 491,000 likes and 42,000 retweets for Elon Musk. Multiple institutional Twitter accounts (such as the Eiffel Tower Twitter account, Prime Video France, Domino's Pizza France) applauded his feat.

On March 12, 2023, he proposed that his subscribers become shareholders in Angers SCO, in order to buy the club.

In July 2023, MrBeast launched a Twitter challenge to get the most likes under his tweet in 48 hours to collect all his Twitter revenue for August 2023. With a single point, Arkunir manages to get the most likes with almost 500K likes. In a separate tweet, he mentioned donating everything he earns to the charity 30 millions d'amis. The foundation congratulated him on his achievement. The amount paid was €23,192.

From November 28 to December 1, 2024, in Paris in partnership with the Établissement français du sang (EFS) and streamer Farès Bichard, they broke European blood donation record by exceeding 4,000 donations (4,034 donations) in four days of collection, beating the previous record set in Toulouse in 2017 (3,900 donations). This enabled a young public to take part in this action, often for the first time, in a context of very low stocks for the EFS. The initiative boosted registration rates at other blood drives in France compared with previous months.
