= Global Precipitation Measurement =

Joint mission between JAXA and NASA

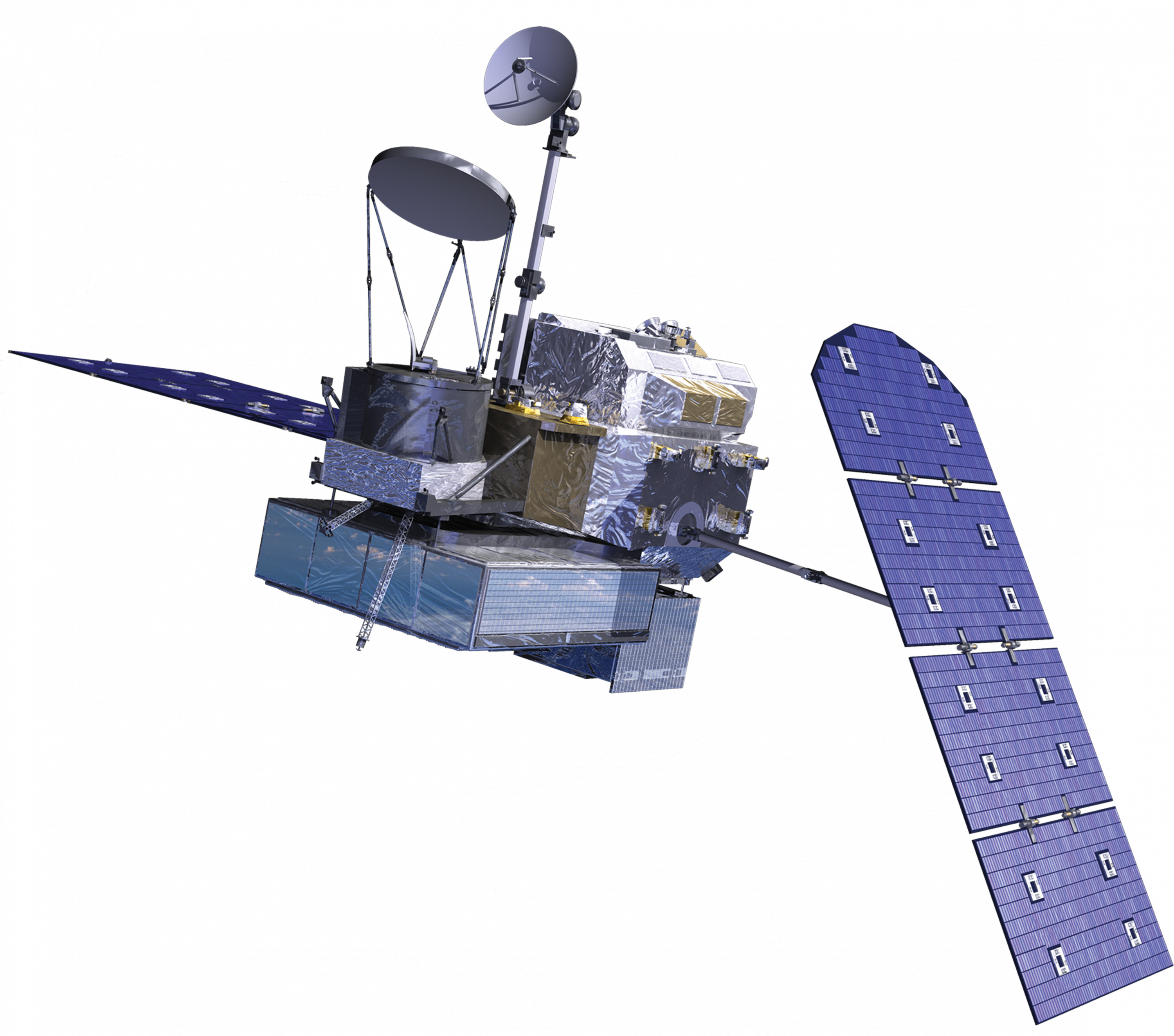
- Artist's concept of the GPM Core Observatory
- Mission type: Environmental research
- Operator: JAXA / NASA
- COSPAR ID: 2014-009C
- SATCAT no.: 39574
- Mission duration: Planned: 3 years Elapsed: 12 years, 5 months, 21 days

Spacecraft properties
- Manufacturer: NASA GSFC / Ball Aerospace / JAXA / NICT / NEC Toshiba Space Systems
- Launch mass: 3,850 kilograms (8,490 lb)
- Power: 1.95 kW

Start of mission
- Launch date: February 27, 2014, 18:37 UTC
- Rocket: H-IIA 202 F-23
- Launch site: Tanegashima Yoshinobu 1
- Contractor: Mitsubishi

Orbital parameters
- Reference system: Geocentric
- Regime: Low Earth
- Semi-major axis: 6,779 kilometres (4,212 mi)
- Perigee altitude: 400.9 kilometres (249.1 mi)
- Apogee altitude: 415.3 kilometres (258.1 mi)
- Inclination: 65°
- Period: 92.60 minutes
- Epoch: 26 March 2017

Global Precipitation Measurement (GPM) is a joint satellite mission between JAXA and NASA as well as other international space agencies to make frequent (every 2–3 hours) observations of Earth's precipitation from orbit. It is part of NASA's Earth Systematic Missions program and works with a satellite constellation to provide full global coverage. The project provides global precipitation maps to assist researchers in improving the forecasting of extreme events, studying global climate, and adding to current capabilities for using such satellite data to benefit society. GPM builds on the notable successes of the Tropical Rainfall Measuring Mission (TRMM), which was also a joint NASA-JAXA activity.

The project is managed by NASA's Goddard Space Flight Center, and consists of a GPM Core Observatory satellite assisted by a constellation of spacecraft from other agencies and missions. The Core Observatory satellite measures the two and three dimensional structure of Earth's precipitation patterns and provides a new calibration standard for the rest of the satellite constellation. The GPM Core Observatory was assembled and tested at Goddard Space Flight Center, and launched from Tanegashima Space Center, Japan, on a Mitsubishi Heavy Industries H-IIA rocket. The launch occurred on February 28, 2014, at 3:37 am JST on the first attempt. Agencies in the United States, Japan, India and France (together with Eumetsat) operate the remaining satellites in the constellation for agency-specific goals, but also cooperatively provide data for GPM.

== Science objectives ==
GPM has five broad science objectives:

- advance precipitation measurement from space
- improve knowledge of precipitation systems, water-cycle variability and freshwater availability
- improve climate modeling and prediction
- improve weather forecasting and climate reanalysis
- improve hydrological modeling and prediction

== Main instruments ==
Visualization of GPM collecting data on March 17th, 2014 over the last major snow storm of winter 2013–2014 to hit the U.S. east coast.

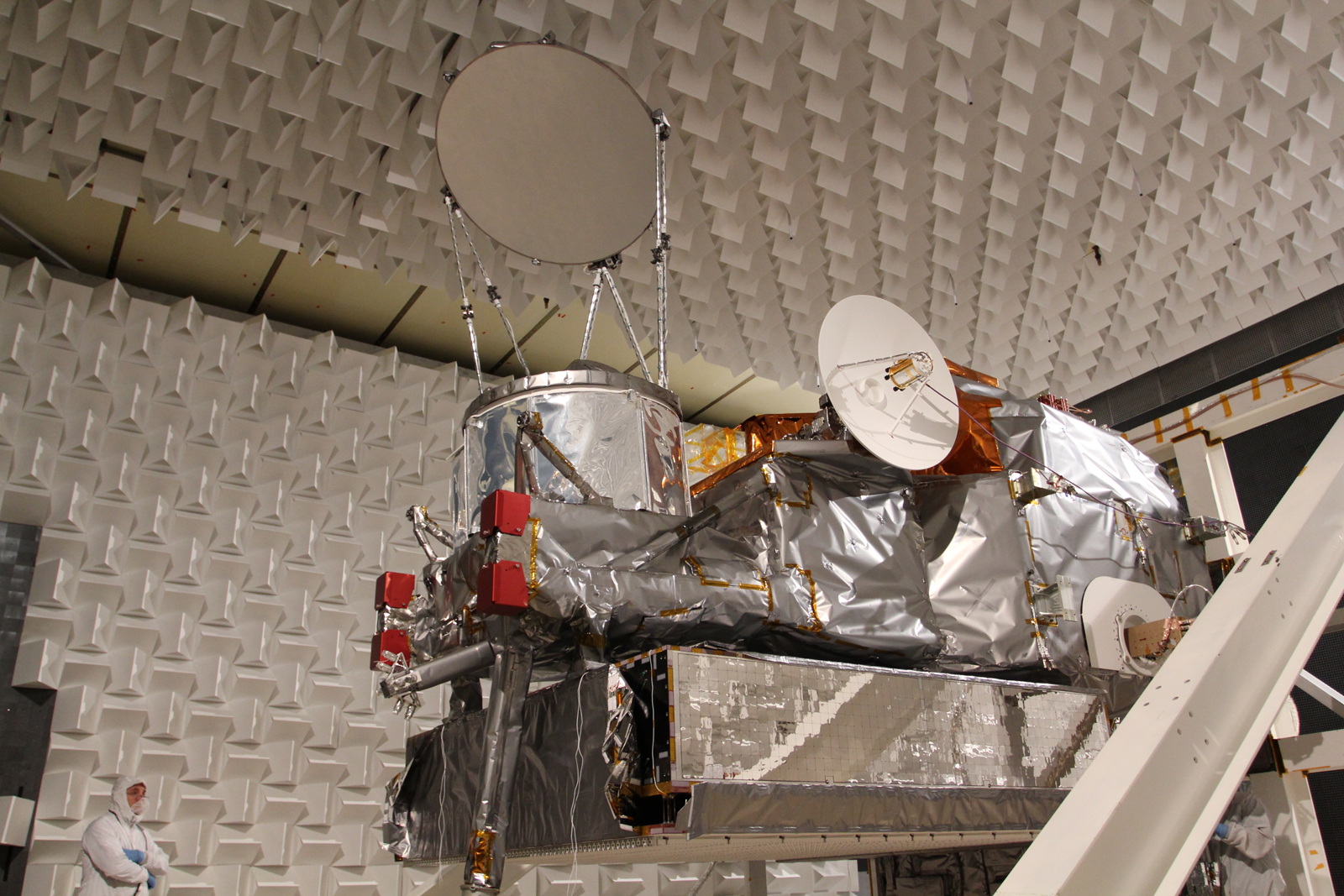
The GPM Core Observatory in the electromagnetic testing chamber at NASA Goddard Space Flight Center in March 2013. The silver disc and drum (center) is the GPM Microwave Imager, and the large block on the base is the Dual-frequency Precipitation Radar.

=== Dual-Frequency Precipitation Radar (DPR) ===
The DPR is a spaceborne radar, providing three-dimensional maps of storm structure across its swath, including the intensity of rainfall and snowfall at the surface. The DPR has two frequencies, allowing researchers to estimate the sizes of precipitation particles and detect a wider range of precipitation rates. The Ku-band radar, similar to the PR on TRMM, covers a 245 km (152 mile) swath. Nested inside that, the Ka-band radar covers a 120 km (74.5 mile) swath. Data from the DPR is sent to the ground via a single-access link with TDRSS relay satellites.

=== GPM Microwave Imager (GMI) ===
The GMI is a passive sensor that observes the microwave energy emitted by the Earth and atmosphere at 13 different frequency/polarization channels. These data allow quantitative maps of precipitation across a swath that is 885 km (550 miles) wide. This instrument continues the legacy of TRMM microwave observations, while adding four additional channels, better resolution, and more reliable calibration. Data from the GMI is continuously sent to the ground via a multiple-access link with TDRSS relay satellites. It has a spin rate of 32 RPM

== Precipitation data sets ==
GPM produces and distributes a wide variety of precipitation data products. Processing takes place at the Precipitation Processing System (PPS) at NASA Goddard Space Flight Center, as well as at the JAXA facility in Japan. Data is provided at multiple "levels" of processing, from raw satellite measurements to best-estimate global precipitation maps using combinations of all the constellation observations and other meteorological data. All data from the mission is made freely available to the public on NASA websites. Precipitation data is made available in a variety of formats, spatial and temporal resolutions, and processing levels which are accessible on the Precipitation Measurement Missions "Data Access" webpage. Several data visualization and analysis tools have been made available to provide easy access for the science and applications communities, which include the in-browser Earth science data analysis tool Giovanni, a web API, and a 3D near-realtime global precipitation viewer.

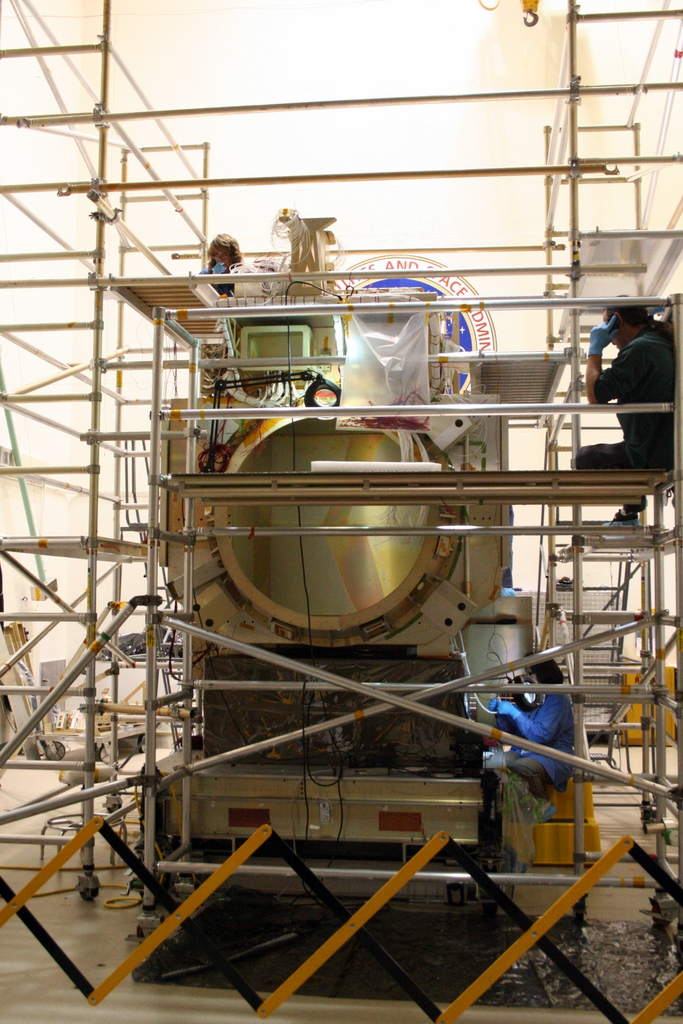
Full-Scale Harness Mockup Model of the Core GPM Spacecraft being used for harness assembly inside the Acoustic Chamber at GSFC.

== Social media and outreach ==
This animation shows GPM collecting some of its first data on March 10th over a Pacific storm east of Japan.

In addition to maintaining social media accounts and the GPM Road to Launch Blog, JAXA and NASA developed several outreach activities specific to this mission prior to launch that the public could participate in. After launch a series of featured articles and videos were produced to highlight various scientific goals and discoveries of the mission, and an "Extreme Weather" blog is maintained to provide timely updates about the latest extreme precipitation events and natural disasters occurring around the world. A Precipitation Education website is also maintained to provide teachers and students with lesson plans, animations, and other resources to teach about the water cycle, Earth science, and the GPM mission.

- NASA Socials
  - JAXA-NASA DC Cherry Blossom Event
    - April 12, 2013, at NASA's Goddard Space Flight Center in Greenbelt, Maryland
  - GPM Media Day
    - Friday, Nov. 15, 2013, at NASA's Goddard Space Flight Center in Greenbelt, MD
    - Social media users were invited to apply for credentials to attend the media day activities and share their experiences via their own accounts.
- Photo Contests
  - Extreme Weather
  - Let it Snow
  - Unique Perspectives
- GPM Anime Challenge

== In popular culture ==
The main character Mohan Bharghav (Shahrukh Khan) in 2004 Indian film Swades: We, the People is a Project Manager in NASA's GPM project. The movie starts with a press conference pertaining to NASA's GPM, and its upcoming launch. Bharghav discuss the importance of GPM and its positive impact on Earth. In the movie the GPM satellite is launched by the Space Shuttle.

A short anime film of 6 minutes, Dual frequency Precipitation Radar Special Movie, was produced by JAXA and White Fox in 2013.
