= Gail Skofronick Jackson =

American electrical engineer

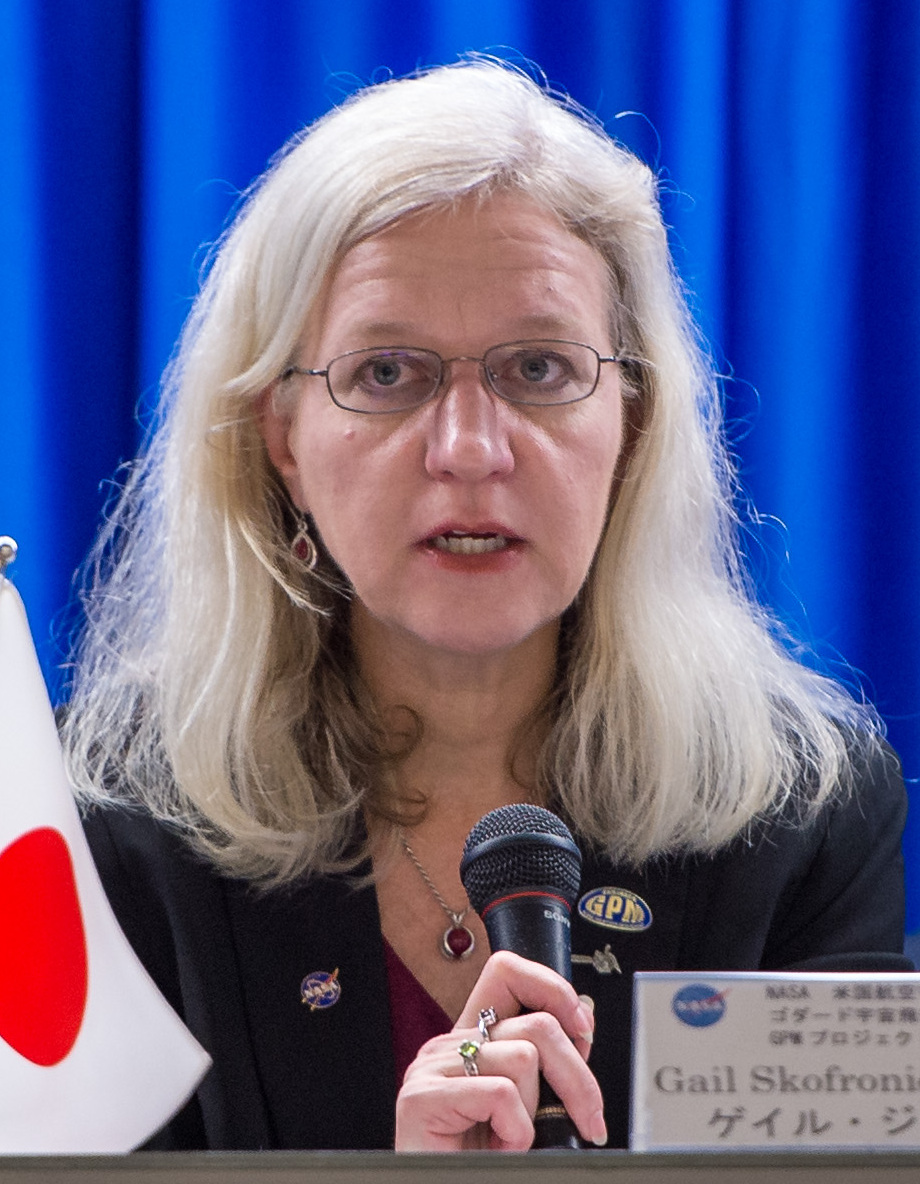
Gail Skofronick Jackson in 2014

Gail Skofronick Jackson from the NASA Goddard Space Flight Center, Greenbelt, MD was named Fellow of the Institute of Electrical and Electronics Engineers (IEEE) in 2015 for contributions to microwave remote sensing of snow. She died in 2021.
