= Horizon Group v. Bonnen =

U.S. libel suit

Horizon Group Management v. Bonnen, No. 2009 L 008675 (Ill. Cir. Ct. July 20, 2009), was a libel suit brought by Horizon Realty Group, a Chicago real estate management company, against one of its former tenants, Amanda Bonnen, in Cook County Circuit Court. This case has received extensive publicity and touches on issues such as consumer protection, limits of libel, free speech, and strategic lawsuits against public participation. The lawsuit was dismissed after a judge determined that the actions did not meet the definition of libel.

Horizon contended that Bonnen defamed Horizon by posting a "tweet", or Twitter message, on May 12, 2009, to her friends that said, "You should just come anyway. Who said sleeping in a moldy apartment was bad for you? Horizon realty thinks it's ok." Horizon asked for at least $50,000 for the alleged libel characterized by the plaintiff's attorney as "liable [sic] per se." The story was first made public by the ChicagoNow columnist Marian Wang.

Jeffrey Michael, whose family runs Horizon, said the suit was warranted and that Horizon is "a sue first, ask questions later kind of an organization."

The lawsuit prompted widespread comment from journalists, bloggers, and legal experts. Sam Bayard, assistant director of Harvard's Citizen Media Law Project called the suit "foolhardy", adding "They chose to file a lawsuit, instead drawing more attention to it," rather than handling the matter as a consumer complaint.

Michael later stated that Bonnen's Twitter post emerged from an earlier lawsuit by Bonnen that Horizon violated the Chicago Residential Landlord Tenant Ordinance, although Michael denied his suit was a strategic lawsuit against public participation. The exact cause of Bonnen's lawsuit was not discussed by Michael, but he acknowledged a leaky roof at the apartment complex caused by a contractor in March 2009. Court documents revealed that Bonnen originally sued Horizon for failing to pay interest on security deposits and failing to provide tenants with required porch safety disclosures.

Bonnen was represented by the Balough Law Offices, LLC, the Center for Information Technology and Privacy Law at John Marshall Law School and The Law Offices of Jeffrey S. Sobek, P.C. On January 21, 2010, Horizon's suit was dismissed; the judge felt the original tweet was too vague to meet the strict definition of libel.

== See also ==
- Streisand effect
