= Waleed Abdalati =

American academic and NASA chief scientist

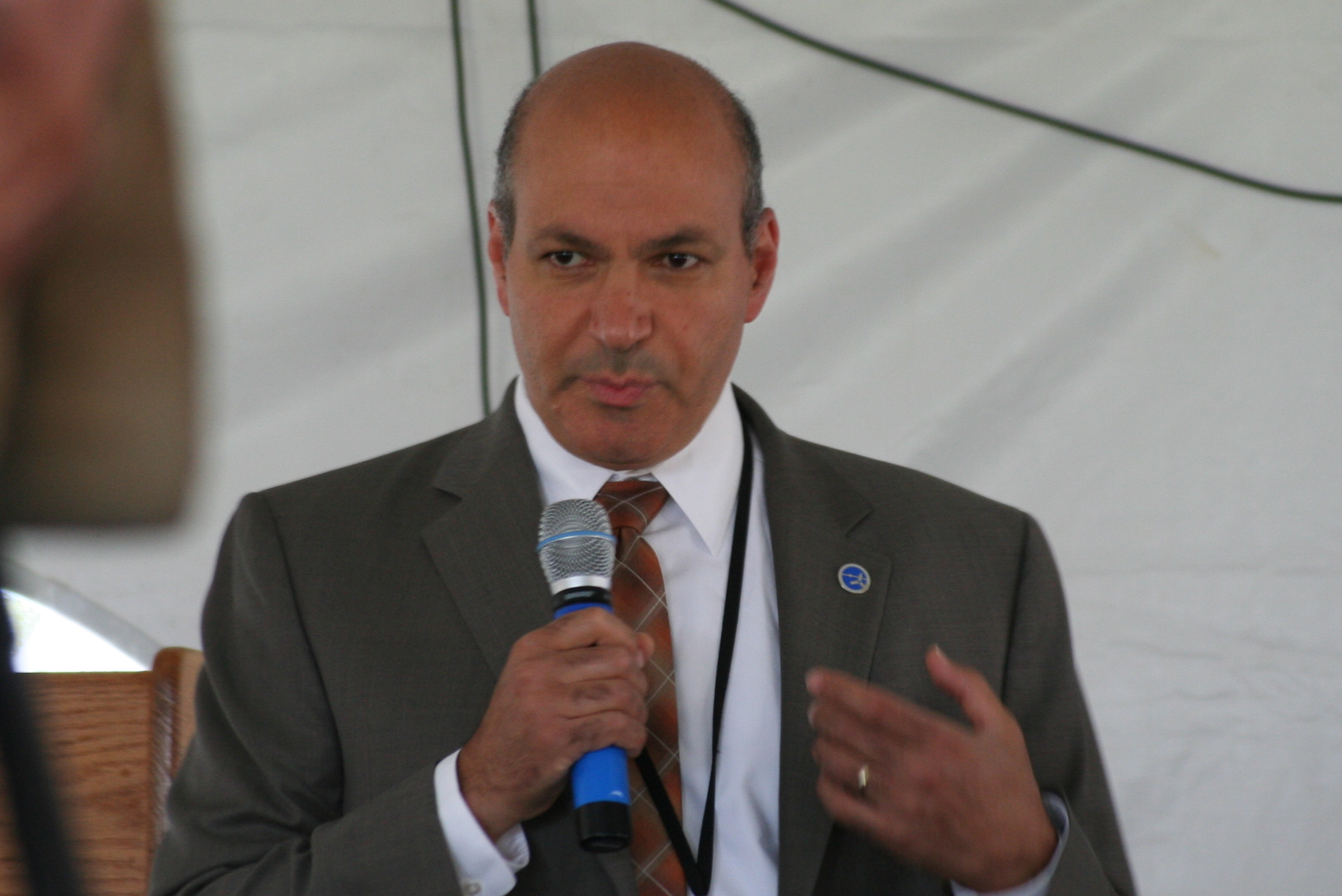
- Education: Syracuse University (B.S., 1986); University of Colorado Boulder (M.S., 1991; Ph.D., 1996)
- Known for: Satellite remote sensing of polar ice sheets NASA Chief Scientist (2011–2012); Director of the CIRES
- Awards: Presidential Early Career Award for Scientists and Engineers (1999); NASA Exceptional Service Medal (2004); AAAS Fellow (2019)

Waleed Abdalati is an Earth scientist and professor at the University of Colorado at Boulder, who held the position of NASA Chief Scientist from 3 January 2011 through December 2012. Abdalati was named to this position on 13 December 2010 by NASA Administrator Charles Bolden. Abdalati previously served NASA as Head of Cryospheric Sciences at Goddard Space Flight Center between January 2004 and June 2008.

== Early life and education ==
Abdalati grew up in New Hartford, New York and lost his father at age 12.

Abdalati earned a Bachelor of Science (cum laude) from Syracuse University Department of Mechanical and Aerospace Engineering in 1986, and later completed his graduate studies at the University of Colorado, where he received a M.Sc. in 1991 from the Department of Aerospace Engineering Sciences and a Ph.D. in 1996 from the Department of Geography. In his doctoral research, Abdalati developed an algorithm to use the ratio of two microwave bands of the Special Sensor Microwave/Imager (SSM/I) sensor aboard Defense Meteorological Satellite Program (DMSP) vehicles to remotely detect changes in the spatial extent of the Greenland ice sheet's annual melt.

== Career ==
Abdalati is seconded to NASA from the University of Colorado at Boulder, where he is Director of the Earth Science and Observation Center at the Cooperative Institute for Research in Environmental Sciences and associate professor in the Department of Geography. He is the current director of the Cooperative Institute for Research in Environmental Sciences. His research is particularly focused on how ice and glaciers affects the Earth.

In November 2020, Abdalati was named a member of the Joe Biden presidential transition Agency Review Team to support transition efforts related to the National Aeronautics and Space Administration.

In May 2026, Abdalati spoke with radio program Living on Earth about the Trump administration's recent plans to dismantle the National Center for Atmospheric Research (NCAR). Abdalati expressed concern to the radio program that dismantling the center could potentially hinder the nation's ability to predict and understand future weather events and implications.

== Honors and awards ==
- Fellow, American Association for the Advancement of Science (since 2019)
- NASA GSFC Center Director's Team Recognition Award, 2007
- American Institute of Aeronautics and Astronaustics Space Systems Award, 2006
- National Aeronautics and Space Administration Exceptional Service Medal, 2004
- NASA Group Achievement Award, ICESat Science Team, 2004
- NASA Office of Earth Science Award, 2003
- NASA Group Achievement Award, Honor Award Team 2003
- NASA Office of Earth Science Terra Peer Award, 2002
- NASA Office of Earth Science Award, 2002
- NASA Office of Earth Science Award, 2001
- Presidential Early Career Award for Scientists and Engineers, 1999
- Tau Beta Pi National Engineering Honor Society (since 1985)
