= Feminist Hulk =

Suspended Twitter account

The profile picture of Feminist Hulk

Feminist Hulk (@feministhulk) was a parody Twitter account written from the perspective of a feminist incarnation of the Hulk, a Marvel Comics superhero with boundless rage and strength but a limited vocabulary. Feminist Hulk incorporated feminist theory into tweets, notably threatening to smash the patriarchy and gender binary. Blogger Christopher Shea observed that part of the humor "comes from hearing feminist theory spouted by such a hypermasculine figure."

== Overview ==
The Feminist Hulk Twitter profile read "HULK SAYS FUCK PATRIARCHY. HULK SMASH GENDER BINARY." The Twitter avatar for Feminist Hulk was an image of the Marvel Comics superhero holding a copy of philosopher and gender theorist Judith Butler's book Gender Trouble. Feminist Hulk tweeted in all caps, but made an exception for feminist author bell hooks, tweeting "HULK MAKE CAPITALIZATION EXCEPTION FOR bell hooks. HULK LOVE HER ESSAY ON MADONNA AND RACIST APPROPRIATION".

== History ==
Feminist Hulk started tweeting on May 11, 2010, quickly followed by the online magazine Salon. By June 2010, the account had gained over 15,000 followers and had been interviewed on Ms. magazine and Feministing blogs.

By 2011, Feminist Hulk garnered over 40,000 followers and was included in Amanda Palmer's "Most Amusing Tweets of the Year" song. In another interview with Ms. in August 2011, the writer of the Feminist Hulk revealed her identity as University of Iowa Ph.D candidate Jessica Lawson. She described herself as a "white, vegan, queer, woman-identified female." In the interview, she described the Feminist Hulk as more a place where people can test their ideas than a translator for theory, saying "If that just makes Hulk the green doorman for an internet speakeasy of feminist brain-nuzzling, so be it!" Lawson incorporates her own life experiences into Feminist Hulk, tweeting about motherhood, vegan baking, and her love for kale.

By 2013, Feminist Hulk had 74,000 followers on Twitter.

As of 2021, the Feminist Hulk account is no longer active, having been suspended for violating the Twitter rules.

=== WIC/Formula Resource Project ===
In the wake of the United States federal government shutdown of 2013, insufficient funding disrupted some WIC food and nutrition programs. Lawson, herself a single mother, set up the website feministhulk.net, using the site as a directory for women who need to find resources during the shutdown and for people who would like to make donations. The site includes links to lists of food banks and a state-by-state guide to resources for infant formula and updates on the status of WIC.

== See also ==
- She-Hulk
