= White House Iraq Group =

Bush White House task force formed in Aug. 2002 preceding March 2003 Iraq invasion

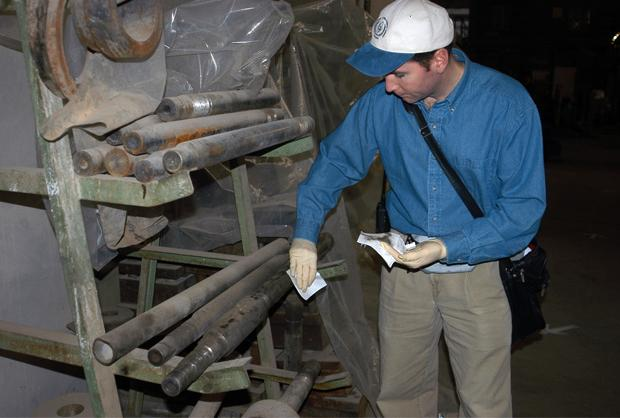
A UN weapons inspector in Iraq

The White House Iraq Group (a.k.a. White House Information Group or WHIG) was a working group of the White House set up in August 2002 and tasked with disseminating information supporting the positions of the George W. Bush administration relating to a possible invasion of Iraq, which would subsequently take place in March 2003.

The task force was set up by White House Chief of Staff Andrew Card and chaired by Karl Rove to coordinate all of the executive branch elements in the run-up to the war in Iraq. However, it is widely speculated that the intention of the task force was "escalation of rhetoric about the danger that Iraq posed to the U.S., including the introduction of the term 'mushroom cloud'".

== Timeline ==
Soon after WHIG was formed, the Bush administration's claims about the danger Iraq posed escalated significantly:

- September 5, 2002: In a WHIG meeting, chief Bush speechwriter Michael Gerson proposes the use of a "smoking gun/mushroom cloud" metaphor to sell the American public on the supposed nuclear dangers posed by Saddam Hussein. According to Newsweek columnist Michael Isikoff, "The original plan had been to place it in an upcoming presidential speech, but WHIG members fancied it so much that when the Times reporters contacted the White House to talk about their upcoming piece [about aluminum tubes], one of them leaked Gerson's phrase — and the administration would soon make maximum use of it." (Hubris, p. 35.)
- September 6, 2002: In an interview with the New York Times, White House Chief of Staff Andrew Card did not mention the WHIG specifically but hinted at its mission: "From a marketing point of view, you don't introduce new products in August." On September 17, 2002, commentator Matt Miller stated on NPR that the Card's statement was in response to the question: "... why the administration waited until after Labor Day to try to sell the American people on military action against Iraq"
- September 7–8, 2002: President Bush and a plurality of top advisers blanketed the airwaves, talking about the dangers posed by Iraq.

== Members ==
The members of the White House Iraq Group include:

- Karl Rove
- Karen Hughes
- Mary Matalin
- Andrew Card
- Dan Bartlett
- James R. Wilkinson
- Condoleezza Rice
- Stephen Hadley
- I. Lewis (Scooter) Libby
- Michael Gerson
- Rendon Group
- Ari Fleischer

== Response to yellowcake forgery issue ==
In response to the yellowcake forgery issue, the White House Iraq Group devised a strategy to combat critics:

"There is a strategy now, devised by White House communications director Dan Bartlett, Mary Matalin, a former aide to Vice President Cheney, and former Bush aide Karen Hughes. Both advise the White House as a consultants to the Republican National Committee.

The plan: Release all relevant information. Try to shift attention back to Bush's leadership in the war on terrorism. Diminish the significance of that single piece of iffy intelligence by making the case that Saddam was a threat for many other reasons. Put Republican lawmakers and other Bush allies on TV to defend him.

Most important: Question the motives of Democrats who supported the war but now are criticizing the president."

From British Report:

From our examination of the intelligence and other material on Iraqi attempts to buy uranium from Africa, we have concluded that:

a. It is accepted by all parties that Iraqi officials visited Niger in 1999.

b. The British Government had intelligence from several different sources indicating that this visit was for the purpose of acquiring uranium. Since uranium constitutes almost three-quarters of Niger's exports, the intelligence was credible.

c. The evidence was not conclusive that Iraq actually purchased, as opposed to having sought, uranium and the British Government did not claim this.

d. The forged documents were not available to the British Government at the time its assessment was made, and so the fact of the forgery does not undermine it.

== CIA leak scandal ==
Records and notes of White House Iraq Group activities were subpoenaed by Special Counsel Patrick Fitzgerald as part of the investigation into the leak of CIA operative Valerie Plame's identity.
