= Scott McClellan =

American press secretary (born 1968)

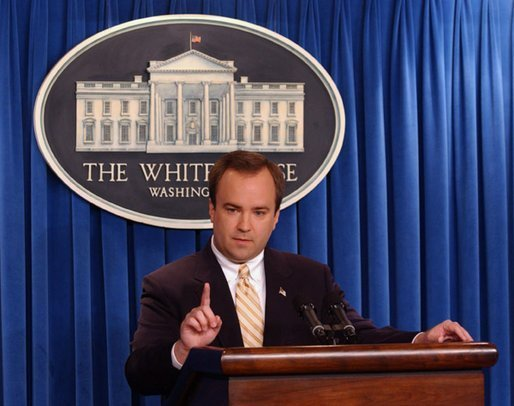
- McClellan in 2003

24th White House Press Secretary
- In office July 15, 2003 – May 10, 2006
- President: George W. Bush
- Preceded by: Ari Fleischer
- Succeeded by: Tony Snow

White House Deputy Press Secretary
- In office January 20, 2001 – July 15, 2003
- President: George W. Bush
- Secretary: Ari Fleischer
- Preceded by: Jake Siewert
- Succeeded by: Dana Perino

Personal details
- Born: February 14, 1968 (age 58) Austin, Texas, U.S.
- Party: Republican (Formerly); Independent
- Spouse: Jill Martinez (m. 2003)
- Children: 3
- Parents: Barr McClellan (father); Carole Keeton Strayhorn (mother)
- Relatives: W. Page Keeton (grandfather)
- Education: University of Texas at Austin (BA)

Scott McClellan (born February 14, 1968) is an American politician who served as the 24th White House press secretary from 2003 to 2006. He was also the author of a controversial No. 1 New York Times bestseller about the Bush administration titled What Happened. He replaced Ari Fleischer as press secretary in July 2003 and served until May 10, 2006. McClellan was the longest serving press secretary under George W. Bush.

He is now the Vice President for Communications at Seattle University.

== Family ==
Born in Austin, Texas, McClellan is the youngest son of Carole Keeton, former Texas State Comptroller and former 2006 independent Texas gubernatorial candidate, and attorney Barr McClellan. McClellan's brother Mark headed the Centers for Medicare and Medicaid Services and was formerly Commissioner for the Food and Drug Administration. McClellan is the grandson of the late W. Page Keeton, longtime Dean of the University of Texas School of Law and renowned expert in tort law. He married Jill Martinez in November 2003. They have three sons.

== Career ==
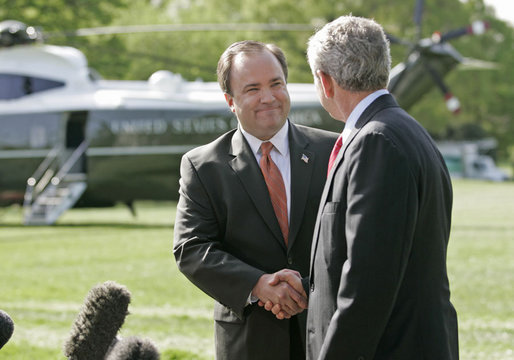
McClellan with President Bush as he announced his resignation as White House Press Secretary.

McClellan graduated from Austin High School in 1986. He was a top-ranked tennis player there and served as student council president. He later graduated from The University of Texas at Austin, where he was president of Sigma Phi Epsilon and a member of the tennis team in his early college years, with a B.A. in 1991. He served as campaign manager for three of his mother's successful campaigns for statewide office. In addition, he worked on political grassroots efforts and was the Chief of Staff to a Texas State Senator.

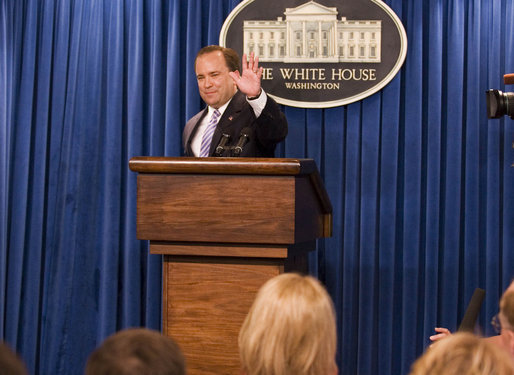
McClellan waves farewell following his final press conference, May 5, 2006.

Karen Hughes, then-Governor of Texas George W. Bush's communications director, hired McClellan to be Bush's deputy communications director. McClellan served as Bush's traveling press secretary during the 2000 presidential election. McClellan became White House Deputy Press Secretary in 2001. McClellan replaced Ari Fleischer, who stepped down as White House Press Secretary on July 15, 2003. McClellan announced his resignation as Press Secretary on April 19, 2006, and was replaced with Tony Snow.

== Memoir and criticism of Bush administration ==
McClellan criticized the Bush administration in his 2008 memoir, What Happened. In the book, he accused Bush of "self-deception" and of maintaining a "permanent campaign approach" to governing rather than making the best choices. McClellan stopped short of saying that Bush purposely lied about his reasons for the 2003 invasion of Iraq, writing that the administration was not "employing out-and-out deception" to make the case for war in 2002, though he did assert the administration relied on an aggressive "political propaganda campaign" to sell the Iraq War. His book was also critical of the White House press corps for being too accepting of the administration's perspective on the war, and of Condoleezza Rice for being "too accommodating" and overly careful about protecting her own reputation.

In a Washington Post article on June 1, 2008, McClellan said of Bush: "I still like and admire George W. Bush. I consider him a fundamentally decent person, and I do not believe he or his White House deliberately or consciously sought to deceive the American people."

Speaking frequently on the TV circuit, McClellan told Keith Olbermann in an interview on June 9, 2008, regarding the Iraq War planning: "I don't think there was a conspiracy theory there, some conspiracy to deliberately mislead. I don't want to imply a sinister intent. There might have been some individuals that knew more than others and tried to push things forward in a certain way, and that's something I can't speak to. I don't think that you had a bunch of people sitting around a room, planning and plotting in a sinister way. That's the point I make in the book. At the same time, whether or not it was sinister or not, it was very troubling that we went to war on this basis."

As a result of his assertions in his book, McClellan was invited to testify before the U.S. House Committee on the Judiciary. During the actual testimony McClellan said: "I do not think the president had any knowledge" (of the revelation of Valerie Plame Wilson's identity as a C.I.A. agent); "In terms of the vice president, I do not know."

=== Response to criticisms ===
The Bush administration responded through Press Secretary Dana Perino, who said, "Scott, we now know, is disgruntled about his experience at the White House. We are puzzled. It is sad. This is not the Scott we knew."

Critics of McClellan's book included former White House staffers such as Karl Rove, Dan Bartlett, Ari Fleischer and Mary Matalin. Fleischer and Matalin have claimed that McClellan had not shared similar doubts during his tenure in the White House, and that if he had held such doubts then he ought not to have replaced Fleischer as Press Secretary. McClellan has responded by stating that he, like many other Americans, was inclined to give the administration the "benefit of the doubt" on the necessity of the Iraq War, and did not fully appreciate the circumstances until after leaving the "White House bubble".

Bob Dole penned an excoriation of McClellan's book, writing, "Bottom line is that I have little respect for turncoats like McClellan who have it both ways. Some in public (and private) life have no shame when big bucks are involved. If their motive is 'good government,' O.K. but that's rarely the case." Dole likened the experience to a personal one, referring to a book, "Senator for Sale," written in 1995 by his ex-staffer, Stanley Hilton, who worked for him in 1979 and 1980. Dole's spokesperson, Nelson Warfield, responded to the book by characterizing it, in the Boston Globe, as "pure garbage," a "lame attempt at character assassination."

On May 28, 2008, The O'Reilly Factor host Bill O'Reilly presented a clip from an interview with Fleischer, who suggested that the book was heavily influenced by the publisher's editor. In a subsequent interview on The O'Reilly Factor days later, McClellan told O'Reilly that contention was not true. McClellan further testified under oath before the House Judiciary Committee that Fleischer's assertion was false. McClellan stated on MSNBC's Countdown with Keith Olbermann that "everything in the book is a clear reflection of my views and everything in the book is mine."

== 2008 election cycle ==
McClellan endorsed Barack Obama for president on CNN's D.L. Hughley Breaks the News aired on October 25, 2008. The endorsement was reported in the press two days earlier as the show had been taped prior to airing.

Political offices
Preceded by Ari Fleischer	White House Press Secretary; 2003–2006	Succeeded by Tony Snow
