= Kate Berner =

American political advisor

White House Principal Deputy Communications Director
- In office January 20, 2021 – May 31, 2023
- President: Joe Biden
- Director: Kate Bedingfield; Ben LaBolt
- Preceded by: Brian Morgenstern
- Succeeded by: Kristen Orthman

Personal details
- Party: Democratic
- Education: University of Chicago (BA)

Kate Berner is an American political advisor who served as a White House principal deputy communications director in the Biden administration.

== Early life and education ==
A native of Hastings-on-Hudson, New York, Berner is the sister of Jack Berner. She graduated from Hastings High School and earned a Bachelor of Arts degree from the University of Chicago.

As a child, Berner performed voice work for Between the Lions, the American animated/live-action/puppet educational children's television series designed to promote reading literacy.

== Career ==
Berner was previously a vice president at SKDK. During the Obama administration, Berner was the director of outreach and in the Office of the Vice President of the United States and special advisor in the United States Department of Commerce. She also worked as a spokeswoman for the Obama Foundation. Berner was deputy director of communications for the Joe Biden 2020 presidential campaign, where she managed campaign messaging.
