= Dan Bartlett =

American political advisor (born 1971)

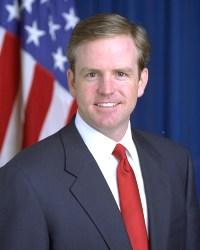

Counselor to the President
- In office January 5, 2005 – July 5, 2007
- President: George W. Bush
- Preceded by: Karen Hughes (2002)
- Succeeded by: Ed Gillespie

White House Communications Director
- In office October 2, 2001 – January 5, 2005
- President: George W. Bush
- Preceded by: Karen Hughes
- Succeeded by: Nicolle Wallace

Personal details
- Born: Daniel Joseph Bartlett; June 1, 1971 (age 55) Waukegan, Illinois, U.S.
- Party: Republican
- Spouse: Allyson
- Children: 4
- Education: University of Texas, Austin (BA)

Daniel Joseph Bartlett (born June 1, 1971) is an American political advisor who served as counselor to the president and communications director in the administration of George W. Bush.

== Early life and education ==
Bartlett grew up in Rockwall, Texas and is a 1989 graduate of Rockwall High School. He earned a bachelor of arts degree in political science from the University of Texas at Austin.

== Political career ==
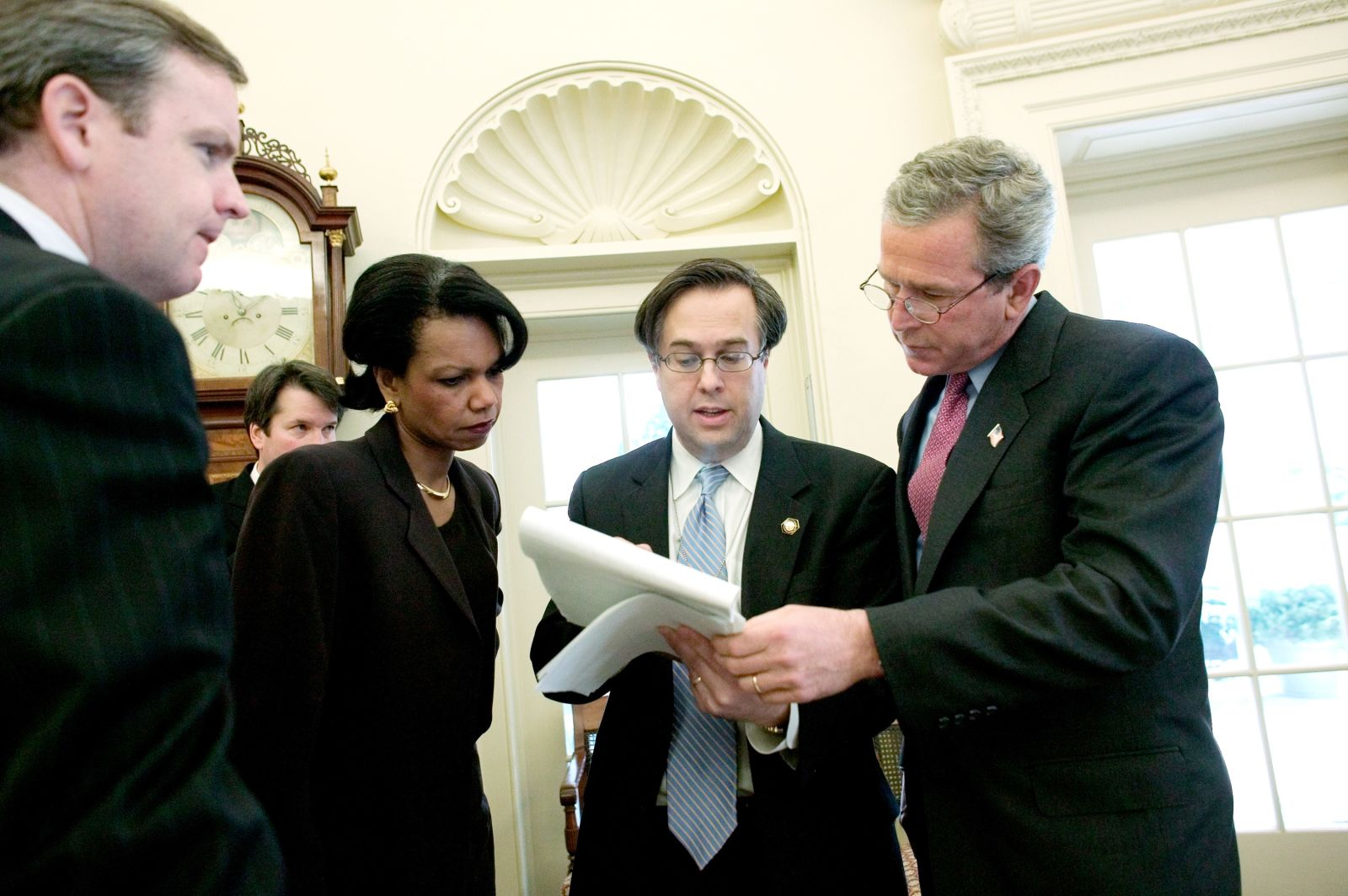
Bartlett, Brett Kavanaugh, Condoleezza Rice, and Mike Gerson review President George W. Bush's State of the Union speech in 2004.

=== Bush gubernatorial staff (1990s) ===
Bartlett worked on George W. Bush's first campaign for governor in 1994, when Bush unseated Ann W. Richards. He was appointed as deputy to the policy director in the governor's office and was issues director for Bush's 1998 gubernatorial re-election campaign.

=== Bush 2000 presidential campaign ===
Bartlett was the director of rapid response for George W. Bush's 2000 presidential campaign.

=== White House communications director (2001-2005) ===
After Bush assumed office as president, he worked as a deputy to advisor Karen Hughes before being named White House communications director. During 9/11, Bartlett accidentally took a week's worth of anti-anthrax tablets provided by Dr Richard Tubb whilst onboard Air Force One, leading to false allegations of him attempting to overdose on the plane.

Following the July 6, 2003, editorial by former ambassador Joseph Wilson, Bartlett (with Ari Fleischer) pushed reporters to pursue who in the CIA sent him to Niger, but stopped short of revealing that his wife worked for the agency.

On September 1, 2004, Bartlett appeared on the Daily Show with Jon Stewart on the second night of the 2004 Republican National Convention, where he discussed the convention and campaign.

=== Counselor to the president (2005-2007) ===
On January 5, 2005, the White House announced that Bartlett would assume the role of counselor to the president, which allows him to focus more broadly on strategic communication and the formulation of policy. He has also worked for Karl Rove's political consulting firm. On June 1, 2007, Bartlett announced his resignation as Counsel to the President.

=== Post-resignation controversies ===
At the end of 2007, during an interview after having left the White House, Bartlett implied some conservative bloggers, such as Hugh Hewitt, were unfiltered mouthpieces for the GOP and the Bush White House.

I mean, talk about a direct IV into the vein of your support. It's a very efficient way to communicate. They regurgitate exactly and put up on their blogs what you said to them. It is something that we've cultivated and have really tried to put quite a bit of focus on.

In May 2008, Bartlett appeared on various media outlets casting aspersions on the contentions raised by Scott McClellan in his book What Happened that the administration had repeatedly "shaded the truth" in connection with justifying the Iraq War, and describing the role that various administration officials played in the Valerie Plame leak case. In a May 2008 telephone interview with CNN, Bartlett "asserted that McClellan did not play a major role in key events, noting that the former aide was serving as deputy press secretary for domestic issues during the run-up to the war in Iraq, raising questions about how McClellan could claim the President used 'propaganda' to sell the war."

== Consulting ==
On October 28, 2007, Public Strategies, Inc., a business advisory firm, announced they had hired Bartlett as a senior strategist. In March 2009, Bartlett was named president and CEO of Public Strategies.

== Academia ==
In January 2009, Bartlett was named an adjunct faculty member at the Lyndon B. Johnson School of Public Affairs at the University of Texas at Austin, at which he taught a seminar on media and politics.

== Walmart (2013–present) ==
In May 2013, Walmart announced that Bartlett would become the company's new executive vice president of corporate affairs in late June. He has held this position for just over a decade, and has written numerous articles regarding Walmart and his career.

== Personal life ==
In 2000, Bartlett married Allyson Elizabeth Sikes (born 1975). The couple has four sons Jake, Sutton, Whit, and Wynn Bartlett, They reside in Austin, Texas.
