= Tony Snow =

American journalist and speechwriter (1955–2008)

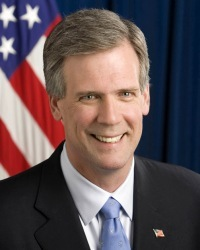
- Snow in 2006

25th White House Press Secretary
- In office May 10, 2006 – September 14, 2007
- President: George W. Bush
- Preceded by: Scott McClellan
- Succeeded by: Dana Perino

White House Director of Speechwriting
- In office February 19, 1991 – January 20, 1993
- President: George H. W. Bush
- Preceded by: Chriss Winston
- Succeeded by: David Kusnet

Personal details
- Born: Robert Anthony Snow; June 1, 1955 Berea, Kentucky, U.S.
- Died: July 12, 2008 (aged 53) Washington, D.C., U.S.
- Party: Democratic (formerly); Republican
- Spouse: Jill Walker (m. 1987)
- Children: 3
- Education: Davidson College (BA); University of Chicago (attended)

Robert Anthony Snow (June 1, 1955 – July 12, 2008) was an American journalist, political commentator, anchor, columnist, musician, and the 25th White House press secretary under President George W. Bush, from May 2006 until his resignation in September 2007. Snow also worked for the President George H. W. Bush as chief speechwriter and Deputy Assistant of Media Affairs, from 1991 to 1993.

Between his two White House stints, Snow was a broadcaster and newspaper columnist. After years of regular guest-hosting for The Rush Limbaugh Show and providing news commentary for National Public Radio, he launched his own talk radio program, The Tony Snow Show, which went on to become nationally syndicated. He was also a regular personality on Fox News Channel beginning in 1996, hosting Fox News Sunday and Weekend Live, and often substituting as host of The O'Reilly Factor. In April 2008, Snow briefly joined CNN as a commentator.

He also made several notable speeches, including keynote addresses at the Conservative Political Action Conference in 2007 and 2008. In his journalistic and governmental capacities, Snow generally supported conservative causes.

== Early life and education ==
Snow was born in Berea, Kentucky, and raised in Cincinnati, Ohio. His father, Jim, was a social studies teacher, guidance counselor, and an assistant principal at Princeton High School in Sharonville, Ohio. His mother was an inner-city nurse who died of colon cancer in 1973, when Snow was 17. Snow developed an early interest in journalism, public policy, and politics, and was editor of his high school newspaper.

After graduating from Princeton High School in 1973, Snow obtained in 1977 a Bachelor of Arts in philosophy from Davidson College in North Carolina. He then taught physics in high school. He attended graduate programs in philosophy and economics at the University of Chicago.

In Ohio, Snow originally registered to vote as a Democrat. He was a convert to Roman Catholicism.

== Career ==
=== Journalism and broadcasting ===
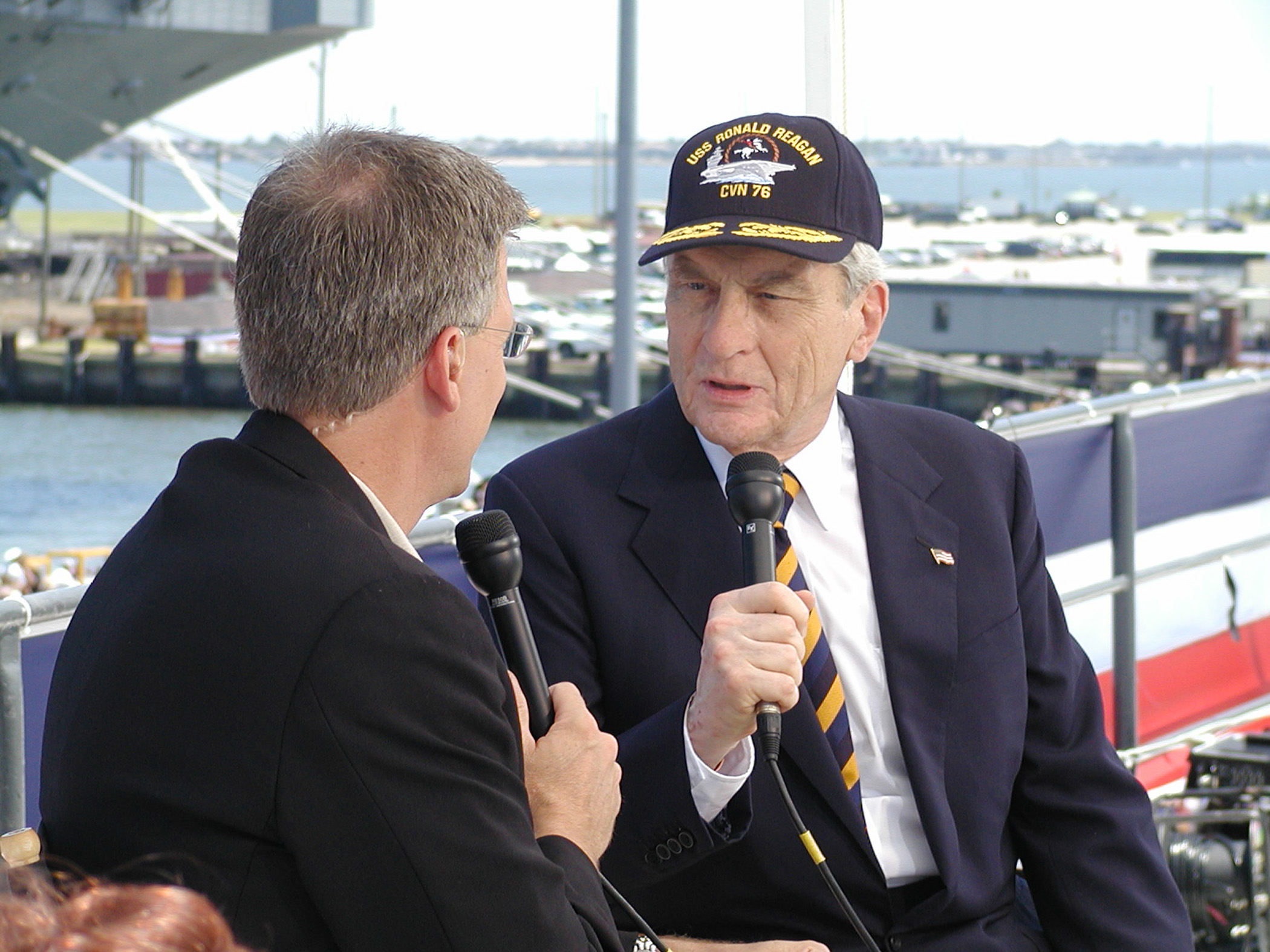
Snow interviewing John Warner in 2003

Snow began his journalism career in 1979 as an editorial writer for The Greensboro Record in Greensboro, North Carolina, next working as an editorial writer at The Virginian-Pilot in Norfolk, Virginia (1981–82), editorial page editor of The Daily Press in Newport News (1982–84), deputy editorial page editor of The Detroit News (1984–87), and editorial page editor of The Washington Times (1987–91).

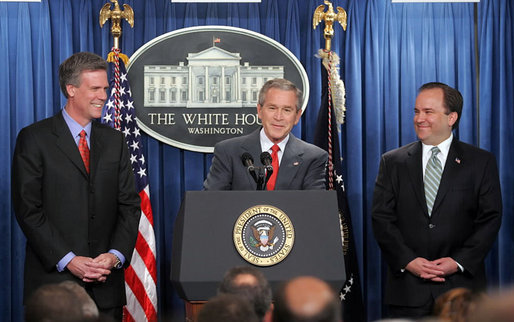
Snow pictured with President George W. Bush and outgoing Press Secretary Scott McClellan, April 2006

In 1991, Snow took a sabbatical from journalism to work in the White House for President George H. W. Bush, first as chief speechwriter (Deputy Assistant to the President for Communications and Director of Speechwriting) and later as Deputy Assistant to the President for Media Affairs (1992–1993).

From 1993 to 2000, The Detroit News published his commentaries, and from 1994 to 2000 he was a Counterpoint Columnist for USA Today. Snow also wrote a syndicated column for Creators Syndicate between 1993 and 2000; his commentaries appeared in more than 200 newspapers nationwide. Snow won numerous awards during his print career, including those from the Virginia Press Association, the Detroit Press Club, the Society of Professional Journalists, the American Society of Newspaper Editors, The Associated Press, and Gannett.

Snow appeared on radio and television programs worldwide including The McLaughlin Group, The MacNeil–Lehrer NewsHour, Face the Nation, Crossfire, and Good Morning America. Until 1994, Snow was the writer, correspondent and host of the PBS news special The New Militant Center.

From 1996 to 2003, Snow was the first host of FOX News Sunday, a Sunday morning interview and roundtable program produced by Fox News, airing on affiliates of the Fox Broadcasting Company and later in the day on Fox News Channel.

Snow was the primary guest host of Rush Limbaugh's program beginning in the mid-1990s. He was also a frequent commentator on National Public Radio. Snow's own Tony Snow Show on Fox News Radio premiered in late 2003. It ended when he became White House Press Secretary in April 2006.

=== White House Press Secretary ===
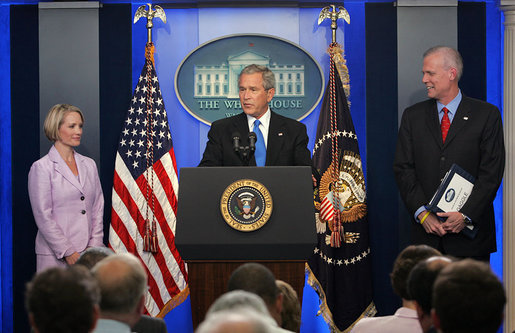
Snow pictured with President George W. Bush and Deputy Press Secretary Dana Perino, August 2007

In April 2006, Snow was named White House Press Secretary in the George W. Bush administration, replacing Scott McClellan. His appointment to the position was formally announced on April 26, 2006. His selection was initially criticized because of some of his past comments about Bush. Bush acknowledged Snow's criticisms during the announcement of Snow's appointment, saying that Snow was "not afraid to express his own opinions".

Snow began his new press secretary duties on May 8, 2006. He decided to leave the position of press secretary after new White House Chief of Staff Josh Bolten asked all staff members to either commit to staying through the end of Bush's second term, in January 2009, or to leave by Labor Day of 2007. On September 13, 2007, Snow gave his final press briefing, saying that he would miss the duties of his position, and that "I love these briefings".

== Personal life ==
Snow was an avid musician. He played the trombone, flute, piccolo, saxophone, and guitar, and belonged to a cover band, Beats Workin', which featured fellow Washington, D.C.-area professionals. Beats Workin' played publicly with a number of rock bands, including Snow's friends Skunk Baxter (The Doobie Brothers, Steely Dan) and Ian Anderson of Jethro Tull. Snow was featured on an episode of VH1 Classic's Rock 'n Roll Fantasy Camp.

In 1987, Snow married Jill Ellen Walker, who survived him. They had three children.

=== Illness and death ===
In February 2005, while still at Fox News, Snow was diagnosed with colon cancer. He returned to broadcasting in April 2005 after undergoing surgery. On March 23, 2007, after almost a year as press secretary, Snow once again took a leave of absence to seek treatment for recurrent cancer. Treatment for the spreading cancer in his final few months forced periodic absences from Snow's duties as press secretary, his subsequent position as a CNN commentator, and his public speaking engagements.

On July 12, 2008, Snow died at Georgetown University Hospital as a result of colon cancer that had spread to his liver. He was 53 years old. Reacting to Snow's death, President George W. Bush praised Snow's ability to bring "a certain civility to this very contentious job".

Media offices
| New office | Anchor of Fox News Sunday; 1996–2003 | Succeeded by Chris Wallace |
Political offices
| Preceded by Scott McClellan | White House Press Secretary; 2006–2007 | Succeeded by Dana Perino |
