= Gerald Lee Warren =

American journalist

Jerry Warren

White House Director of Communications
- In office November 4, 1974 – August 15, 1975
- President: Gerald Ford
- Preceded by: Ken Clawson
- Succeeded by: Margita White

Personal details
- Born: Gerald Lee Warren; August 17, 1930 Hastings, Nebraska, U.S.
- Died: March 20, 2015 (aged 84) Arlington, Virginia, U.S.
- Party: Republican
- Spouse: Euphemia Brownell
- Education: University of Nebraska (BA)

Gerald Lee Warren (August 17, 1930 – March 20, 2015) was an American journalist and newspaper editor at The San Diego Union-Tribune. He served under Ron Ziegler as deputy press secretary in the Richard Nixon administration until 1974. He served as Nixon's de facto final White House Press Secretary after Ron Ziegler's appointment as assistant to the president in June 1974, though Zielger kept the title. He then held the same position as well as White House Director of Communications in the Gerald Ford administration until 1975.

== Early life ==
On August 17, 1930, Warren was born in Hastings, Nebraska.

== Career ==
Warren served as a pilot in the United States Navy during the Korean War. Warren graduated from St. Edward High School, St. Edward, Nebraska, in 1948. He graduated from the University of Nebraska in 1952 with a Bachelor of Arts degree in journalism. In 1951, Warren served as the editor of The Daily Nebraskan while also working as a reporter for The Lincoln Star. From 1952 to 1956, he served as a pilot in the US Navy. Warren joined the San Diego Union in 1956 as a reporter and eventually worked his way up to becoming the assistant city editor. He worked up to become assistant managing director at the paper in 1968, when he was invited to become deputy press secretary at the White House.

In 1969, Warren became a deputy press secretary during the Nixon administration. Warren was the principal presidential spokesman during Nixon administration.

From 1974 to 1975 Warren also served as deputy press secretary to President Gerald Ford. Warren later returned to work for the San Diego Union as an editor from 1975 to 1995. During his time here, he worked towards promoting San Diego and building the community. He was also a strong supporter of University of California, San Diego programs.

Warren was one of three original recipients of the Nixon enemies list memo.

Following his service at the White House, he returned to the Union-Tribune until his retirement in 1995. In 2002, he went into the ministry in Alexandria, Virginia.

== Organizations ==
From 1982 until his death in 2015, Warren was a member of the Chancellor's Associates at UCSD.

== Personal life ==
In 1965, Warren married Euphemia Florence Brownell.

Political offices
Preceded by Ken Clawson	White House Director of Communications; 1974–1975	Succeeded by Margita White
