= Loretta Ucelli =

American communications and management advisor

White House Communications Director
- In office March 10, 1999 – January 20, 2001
- President: Bill Clinton
- Preceded by: Ann Lewis
- Succeeded by: Karen Hughes

Personal details
- Born: New York City, New York, U.S.
- Party: Democratic
- Education: West Virginia University (BS)

Loretta M. Ucelli is a senior communications and management advisor who served as Assistant to the President and Director of White House Communications during the Presidency of Bill Clinton from 1999 – 2001. She currently serves as the Executive Vice President of Strategy and Communications for the Peter G. Peterson Foundation.

== Early life ==
Ucelli began her career as the Anchor and News Director of WCLG-FM Radio in Morgantown, West Virginia and later as News Editor for KDKA Radio in Pittsburgh, Pennsylvania. She received a Bachelor of Science in Journalism in 1976 from West Virginia University. She has appeared as a communications expert on television and in print, including as a guest contributor on CNBC. Ucelli lives in New York City.

== Biography ==
While at the White House, Ucelli advised President Clinton on media and messaging strategies for issues including the economy, environment, healthcare, education and foreign policy. She was also responsible for initiating the use of the internet in President Clinton’s communication strategy, including the incorporation of “web side” chats. Prior to the White House, Ucelli worked as associate administrator for the United States Environmental Protection Agency (EPA), where she led efforts to transform the EPA’s overall communications strategy. She also served as a senior ranking communications executive for the American Federation of Government Employees and the National Association of Broadcasters (NAB).

Since serving in the Clinton administration, she has held executive vice presidential roles within global corporations and educational institutions including Columbia University and Pfizer. An alumnus of West Virginia University (WVU) – where Ucelli won the Distinguished Alumni Award in 2002 – she is also a member of the WVU School of Journalism’s Professional in Residence program, where Ucelli works with students and faculty on issues such as the future of journalism.

Ucelli has served as a member of Baruch College's MA in Corporate Communications Advisory Board; on the Executive Committee of the Public Relations Society of America's New York Chapter; and as a senior advisor to public relations firm Gutenberg Communications. She serves as a board member of the Kips Bay Boys and Girls Club, a member of the Women’s Forum of New York, a member of the Economic Club of New York, and a member of Wise Ones. She is currently the Executive Vice President of Strategy and Communications at the Peter G. Peterson Foundation.

Political offices
Preceded by Ann Lewis	White House Communications Director; 1999–2001	Succeeded by Karen Hughes
