= Kate Bedingfield =

American political advisor (born 1981)

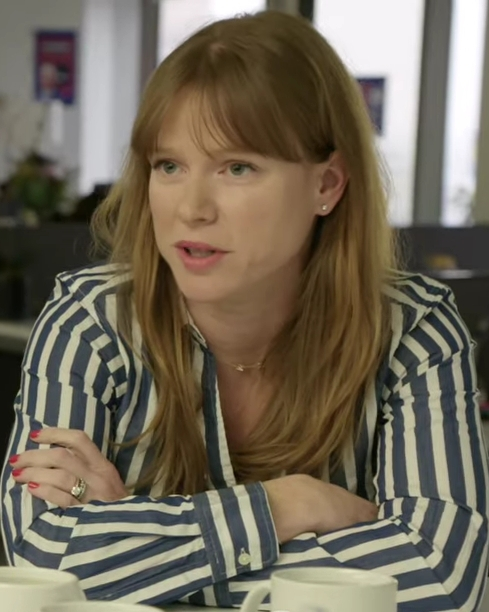
- Bedingfield in 2020

White House Communications Director
- In office January 20, 2021 – March 1, 2023
- President: Joe Biden
- Deputy: Kate Berner (Principal Deputy)
- Preceded by: Stephanie Grisham
- Succeeded by: Ben LaBolt

Personal details
- Born: Katherine Joan Bedingfield; October 29, 1981 (age 45) Georgia, U.S.
- Party: Democratic
- Spouse: David Kieve (m. 2013)
- Children: 2
- Education: University of Virginia (BA)

Katherine Joan Bedingfield (born October 29, 1981) is an American political advisor who served as the White House Communications Director in the Biden administration from 2021 to 2023. She previously served as deputy campaign manager for the Joe Biden 2020 presidential campaign and as communications director for Biden when he was vice president in the Obama administration.

== Early life and education ==
Kate Bedingfield was born on October 29, 1981, and raised in Sandy Springs, Georgia. Her parents are Dana H. and Sid E. Bedingfield. Her father is a journalism professor and a former CNN executive. Her mother is a social media consultant. Bedingfield attended Sandy Springs Middle School and graduated from Riverwood High School. She earned her bachelor's degree from the University of Virginia.

== Career ==
=== Career in politics ===
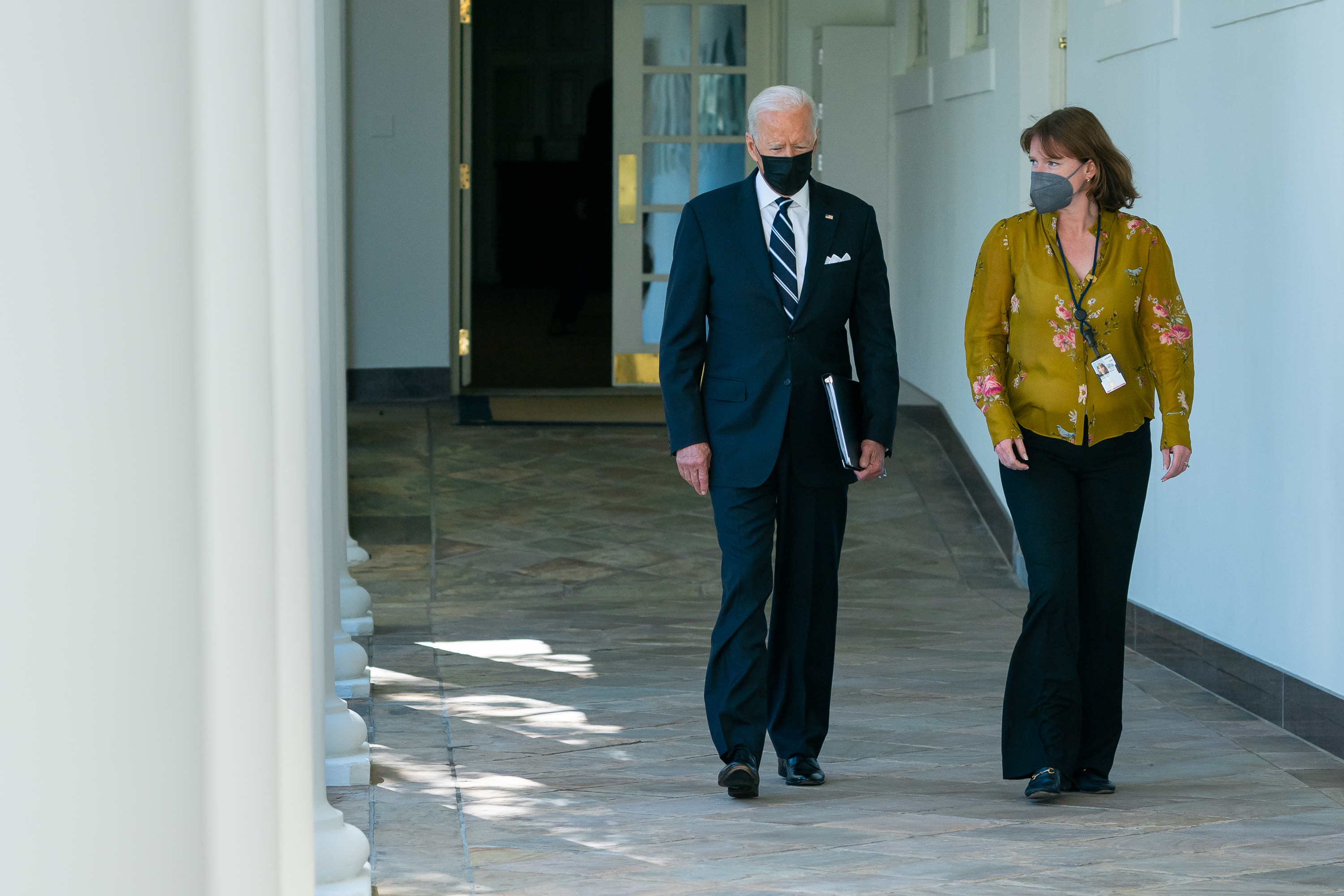
Bedingfield walks along the Colonnade of the White House with President Joe Biden in August 2021

Bedingfield worked on the John Edwards 2008 presidential campaign as spokesperson. She also served as communications director for the 2008 senate campaign for Jeanne Shaheen. In 2015, Bedingfield was named communications director for then Vice President Joe Biden. She also held two additional roles in the Obama administration: director of response, and deputy director of media affairs.

Bedingfield served as deputy campaign manager for the Joe Biden 2020 presidential campaign. Her work on the campaign led to Fortune naming Bedingfield one of the most influential people under the age of 40 in government and politics.

==== Biden administration ====
In November 2020, Bedingfield was designated White House Communications Director for the Biden administration. In late July 2022, Bedingfield reversed the decision announced weeks earlier to leave her position as White House Communications Director.

In February 2023, Bedingfield announced that she would leave the administration at the end of the month. Her position was filled by Ben LaBolt. In July 2023, Bedingfield joined CNN as a political commentator.

=== Private sector ===
In November 2011, Bedingfield started working at the Motion Picture Association of America (MPAA). In May 2013, Bedingfield was named spokesperson and vice president of corporate communications at the MPAA. After working in the Obama administration, Bedingfield returned briefly to sports and entertainment communications.

== Personal life ==
Bedingfield married David Kelley Kieve on January 12, 2013, at St. John's Episcopal Church, Lafayette Square in Washington, D.C. Bedingfield and Kieve have two children together. Kieve currently serves as the President of the Environmental Defense Action Fund.

Government offices
Preceded by Dan Scavino as White House Deputy Chief of Staff for Communications	White House Communications Director; January 20, 2021 – March 1, 2023	Succeeded by Ben LaBolt
