= Permanent campaign =

American political concept

In the United States, the permanent campaign describes the focus which recent presidents have given to electoral concerns during their tenures in office, with the distinction between the time they have spent governing and the time they have spent campaigning having become blurred. Political observers who bolster the opinion that a permanent campaign has had a significant impact on recent presidencies argue that decisions by presidents have increasingly been made with considerations to their impact on voter approval. Political observers consider the rise in presidential fundraising as a symptom of the permanent campaign.

The disproportionately large amounts of time that presidents have spent visiting key electoral states (and comparatively small amount of time they have spent visiting states that pose little electoral importance to them) has been pointed to as evidence of ulterior electoral motives influencing presidential governance, demonstrating the blurred lines between campaigning and governance in the White House.

== History ==
=== Sidney Blumenthal ===
The phrase "the permanent campaign," its concept and history, were first defined by journalist and later presidential senior adviser Sidney Blumenthal in his 1980 book, The Permanent Campaign. In it, he explained how the changes in American politics from old-style patronage and party organization to that based on the modern technology of computer driven polling and media created a fundamentally new system. He explained that political consultants had replaced the party bosses and brought with them a new model by which campaigning became the forms of governing.

Blumenthal's work resolved the problem in political science of "critical realignment." According to Walter Dean Burnham, the leading political scientist of realignment theory,

If we view the arena of American electoral politics in historical perspective, we can say that the contemporary status quo extends back to some point in the mid-to-late 1960s. In his recent study The Permanent Campaign, Sidney Blumenthal has advanced the argument that a critical realignment in fact occurred at about the point—1968—where many analysts had been expecting. They were, however, looking for realignment in the wrong place. For crucial to this one, and the 'sixth electoral era' which he argues followed from it, was the exact opposite of all previous events of this type. Instead of being channeled through, and thus revitalizing the political parties, this realignment involved the conclusive marginal displacement of these parties by the permanent campaign... The older linkages between rulers and ruled become ever hazier, ever more problematic.

Strategies of this nature have been in active development and use since Lyndon Johnson, where priority is given to short term tactical gain over long-term vision. The frenzied, headline grabbing atmosphere of presidential campaigns is carried over into the office itself, thus creating a permanent campaign that limits the ability of policies to deviate from the perceived will of the people (hence, intensive polling).

=== Patrick Caddell ===
Patrick Caddell claims to have conceived the "permanent campaign" as a theory of political science while as a young pollster for U.S. President Jimmy Carter, in a memo on December 10, 1976, entitled "Initial Working Paper on Political Strategy". "Essentially," Caddell wrote, "it is my thesis governing with public approval requires a continuing political campaign."

== American examples ==
=== Bill Clinton ===
The permanent campaign is frequently associated with Bill Clinton, stretching from his long political career, first as Governor of Arkansas, then President of the United States, and his continued prominence on the national stage as a former president and surrogate for his wife Hillary Clinton.

A famous example that illustrates just how strongly this mind-set has come to influence politics was during the Clinton Administration when pollster Dick Morris asked voters to help decide where Bill Clinton would go on vacation. In the words of columnist Joe Klein, "The pressure to 'win' the daily news cycle—to control the news—has overwhelmed the more reflective, statesmanlike aspects of the office."

Robert Reich has suggested that Bill Clinton is in a state of "permanent election", due to the impeachment proceedings during his presidency and his continuing support in the campaigns of his wife Hillary Clinton.

=== George W. Bush ===
Scott McClellan, former White House Press Secretary for U.S. President George W. Bush, wrote in his 2008 memoir What Happened: Inside the Bush White House and Washington's Culture of Deception that the Bush White House suffered from a "permanent campaign" mentality, and that policy decisions were inextricably interwoven with politics.

Bush's presidency offers an example of how presidential travel can disproportionately target states of electoral importance. George W. Bush embarked on 416 domestic trips during his first three years in office. This was 114 more than his predecessor had in his first three years. In his first year, 36% of Bush's domestic trips were to the 16 states that were considered swing states after having been decided the closest margins during the 2000 election. In his second year, 45% of his domestic travel was to these states, and his third year 39% of his domestic travel was to these states.

=== Donald Trump ===
Following his unexpected success at the 2016 presidential election, Donald Trump almost immediately commenced an informal re-election campaign, bringing the notion of a permanent campaign to its logical endpoint. Trump filed the paperwork establishing his 2020 reelection committee the day he took office. He began to hold campaign rallies almost immediately after taking office. Online advertisements have featured heavily – according to The Guardian, "the Trump campaign's spending on Facebook and Google advertisements leading up to the 2018 midterm elections dwarfed every other candidate besides Beto O'Rourke – and Trump wasn't even on the ballot." ThinkProgress observed that "Since his inauguration, the administration has operated in a state of permanent campaign, with no hint of the usual honeymoon hiatus during which newly-elected presidents typically pause to focus exclusively on governing and to hone their policy priorities.", while in The Atlantic, David A. Graham wrote that "Trump never stopped campaigning long enough to govern."

== Other countries ==
Permanent campaigning has been documented in Australia, Canada and the United Kingdom.

== See also ==
- Political campaign
- Invisible Primary
