= Margita White =

American White House press official

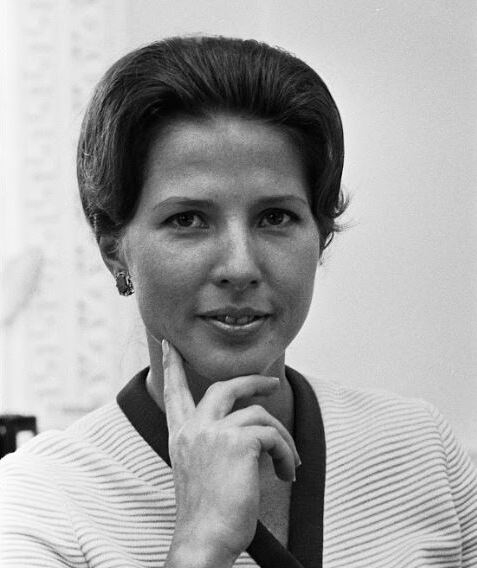
- Margita White in 1972

White House Communications Director
- In office August 15, 1975 – July 12, 1976
- President: Gerald Ford
- Preceded by: Gerald Lee Warren
- Succeeded by: David Gergen

Personal details
- Born: Ulla Margareta Eklund; June 27, 1937; Linköping, Sweden
- Died: November 20, 2002 (aged 65); Arlington, Virginia, U.S.
- Political party: Republican
- Education: University of Redlands (BA); Rutgers University–New Brunswick (MA)

Margita White (born Ulla Margareta Eklund; June 27, 1937 – November 20, 2002) was an American White House press official under Presidents Richard M. Nixon and Gerald R. Ford. She was the first female Communications Director serving under President Ford from August 15, 1975 to July 12, 1976. She was later commissioner with the Federal Communications Commission (FCC) and the president of a lobbying group for new television technologies. She was a founding member of Executive Women in Government. White died of cancer on November 20, 2002.

== Early life ==
Margita White was born Ulla Margareta Eklund in Sweden. She immigrated to the U.S. with her family in 1948 at the age of ten. After, she grew up in Southern California and was always called Margita.

== Education ==
White attended the University of Redlands in California. She started as an economics major, but changed to a government major after spending a semester in Washington, D.C. She graduated magna sum laude in 1959. It was at the University of Redlands that she decided to devote her life to public service. She continued her studies at Rutgers University in New Jersey. She was a Woodrow Wilson National Fellow and received her M.A. in political science in 1960.

== Life and career ==
White worked in both Nixon's 1960 presidential run and Goldwater's 1964 run. Briefly, between the two campaigns, White lived in Hawaii to marry her husband, Stuart C. White (later divorced) who was stationed there with the Navy. While in Hawaii, White worked for a Senate campaign and in the office for a U.S. House Representative.

In 1968 she tried again and worked in the 1968 Nixon campaign. With his victory, she was appointed to the position of assistant to the Communications Director in the White House. Herbert G. Klein was the White House Communications Director at the time.

She was invited to work as the Assistant Director for Public Information at the U.S. Information Agency in 1973. She worked there for two years until she was appointed as the Assistant Press Secretary under Ford in 1975. She was assigned to the position with the understanding that she would take over the Communications Office in six months, which she did and became the first female Communications Director in 1975.

In 1976, White was appointed to a two-year term on the Federal Communications Commission. After her term, she moved on to work in the private sector.

White had two children, Suzanne Morgan and Stuart White.

== Controversy ==
In her first appointment to the White House as Assistant to the Communications Director, White was paid $36,000, which was less than her predecessor. Additionally, she was not given the title of deputy assistant to the president that was the norm for her position. The Ford Administration rejected the claim that both the lesser pay and title were because she was a woman.

Political offices
Preceded by Jerry Warren	White House Director of Communications; 1975–1976	Succeeded by David Gergen
