= Steven Cheung =

American political advisor (born 1982)

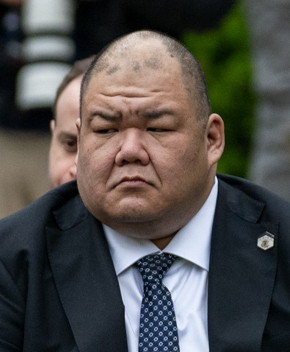
- Cheung in 2025

White House Communications Director
- Incumbent
- Assumed office January 20, 2025
- President: Donald Trump
- Preceded by: Ben LaBolt

Personal details
- Born: June 23, 1982 (age 44) South Sacramento, California, U.S.
- Party: Republican
- Education: California State University, Sacramento (attended)

Steven Cheung (born June 23, 1982) is an American political advisor who has served as the White House communications director since 2025.

Cheung was born in California. He began his political career working as a communications and speechwriting intern for California governor Arnold Schwarzenegger in college. Cheung later worked for Arizona senator John McCain's 2008 presidential campaign, Steve Poizner's campaign in the 2010 California gubernatorial election, Sharron Angle's campaign in the 2010 United States Senate election in Nevada, and Texas lieutenant governor David Dewhurst's campaign for the 2012 United States Senate election in Texas. In 2013, he was hired as the director of communications and public affairs for Ultimate Fighting Championship. In July 2016, Cheung joined Donald Trump's 2016 presidential campaign. Since working for Trump, Cheung has taken a combative and aggressive style in communicating to the press.

Cheung served as the White House assistant communications director and later the director of strategic response in Trump's first presidency. According to former White House aide Cliff Sims, Cheung was instrumental in ensuring Neil Gorsuch's Supreme Court nomination and the passage of the Tax Cuts and Jobs Act. In June 2018, Cheung was fired by John F. Kelly amid broader staff changes. After leaving the White House, Cheung consulted for several campaigns, including Trump's 2020 presidential campaign and Caitlyn Jenner's campaign in the 2021 California gubernatorial recall election. In September 2022, he began leading communications for MAGA Inc., Trump's super PAC. Cheung later became the director of communications for Trump's 2024 presidential campaign. In November 2024, Trump named Cheung as his White House communications director.

== Early life and education (1982–2004) ==
Steven Cheung was born on June 23, 1982, in South Sacramento, California. He is the son of Chinese parents who immigrated to the United States in the 1960s from Hong Kong and Japan.

Cheung graduated from John F. Kennedy High School in 2000. He played for John F. Kennedy's football team. Cheung later attended California State University, Sacramento, majoring in computer science and political science, but did not earn a degree.

== Career ==
=== Early career (2003–2016) ===
While attending California State University, Cheung worked as a communications and speechwriting intern for California governor Arnold Schwarzenegger. After withdrawing from university, Cheung worked for Arizona senator John McCain's 2008 presidential campaign. Cheung later worked for Steve Poizner's campaign in the 2010 California gubernatorial election and Sharron Angle's campaign in the 2010 United States Senate election in Nevada. By October 2011, he had begun working for Texas lieutenant governor David Dewhurst in his campaign for the 2012 United States Senate election in Texas. In 2013, Cheung was hired as the director of communications and public affairs for Ultimate Fighting Championship. His work included the UFC's effort to legalize mixed martial arts in New York and a messaging campaign against the Culinary Union, which was pressing the company's owners to unionize their hotels.

=== Trump campaign and assistant communications director (2016–2018) ===
In July 2016, Cheung was named as the rapid response director for Donald Trump's 2016 presidential campaign, handling "breaking news and pushing back on false or unbalanced reporting." After Trump's victory in the 2016 presidential election, he was named to Trump's presidential transition team, overseeing rapid response. In January 2017, one day prior to Trump's first inauguration, Cheung was appointed as the White House assistant communications director. He became the director of strategic response in September. According to Cliff Sims, Cheung—an obscure aide—was instrumental in ensuring Neil Gorsuch's Supreme Court nomination and the passage of the Tax Cuts and Jobs Act. Cheung was among those fired by White House chief of staff John F. Kelly in June 2018.

=== Post-government work and Trump campaigns (2018–2024) ===
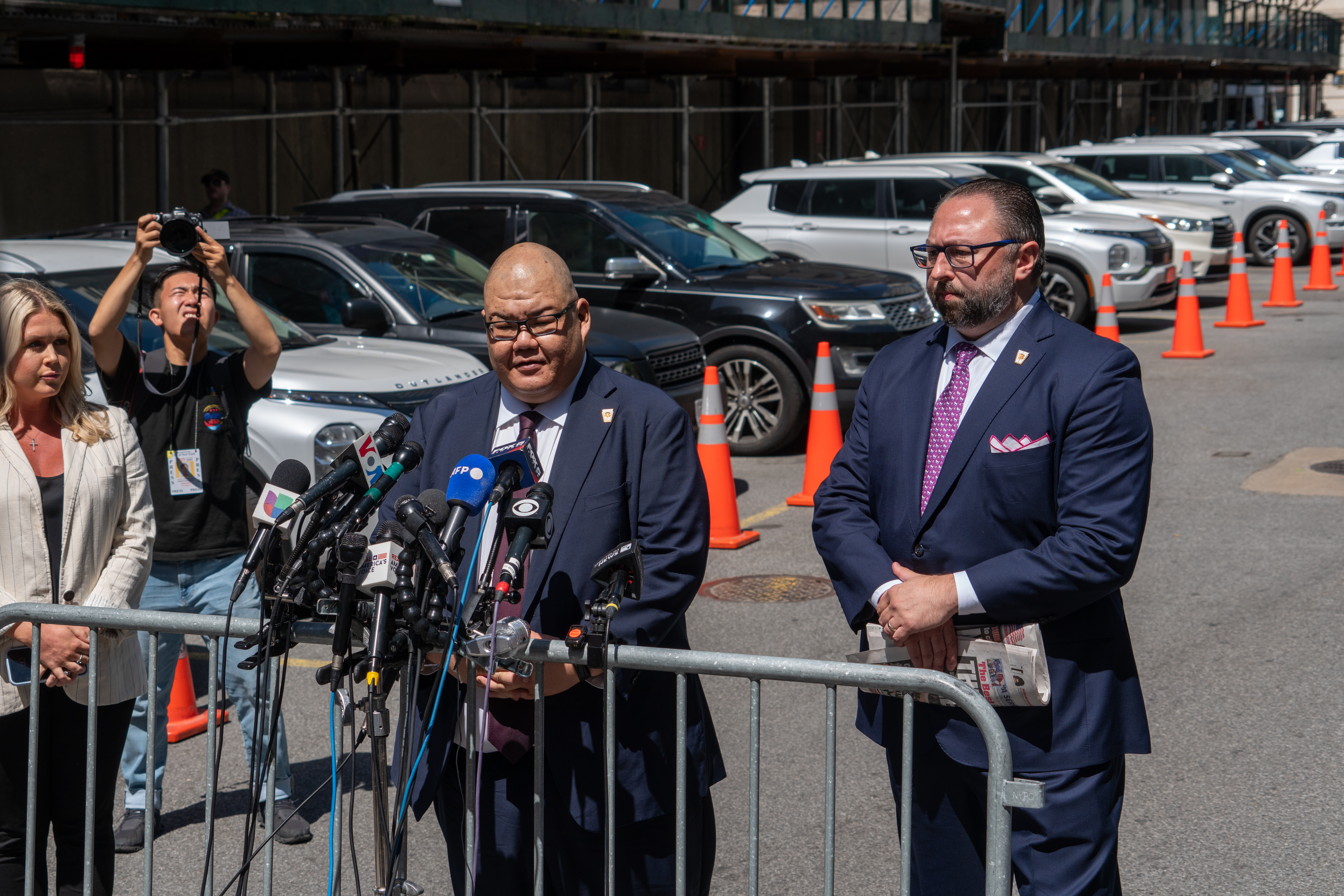
Cheung addresses the media outside the criminal trial of Donald Trump in New York (May 28, 2024).

By August 2019, Cheung had begun consulting on communications for Trump's 2020 presidential campaign through his firm, Solgence. He joined Caitlyn Jenner's campaign in the 2021 California gubernatorial recall election in April 2021. In January 2022, Politico reported that Cheung was considering running in the 2022 United States House of Representatives election for California's ninth congressional district after Representative Jerry McNerney declined to seek a tenth term. Cheung worked for Brock Pierce's tentative campaign in the 2022 United States Senate election in Vermont. He advised former Missouri governor Eric Greitens's campaign in the 2022 United States Senate election in Missouri.

Cheung was involved in the planning of the 2020 Republican National Convention along with several other officials. In September 2022, he was appointed as the director of communications for MAGA Inc., a super PAC for Trump. By March 2023, Cheung had been leading communications for Trump's 2024 presidential campaign. As the campaign's director of communications, he wrote several of Trump's posts on Truth Social.

In August 2024, Donald Trump attended a public wreath-laying ceremony at Arlington National Cemetery. During the visit, Trump and his entourage were photographed and videotaped while among the graves. A Cemetery staffer intervened to stop the filming and the Army said a member of Trump's campaign staff had "abruptly pushed aside" the employee. Cheung stated that his team had been given permission to have an official photographer and videographer outside the main press pool and commented that the staffer seemed to be "clearly suffering from a mental health episode." The staffer declined to press charges. The Army defended the employee, saying she had "acted with professionalism and avoided further disruption".

=== White House Communications Director (2025–present) ===
On November 15, 2024, President-elect Donald Trump named Cheung as his White House communications director. He began serving as the communications director in January 2025. In October, Cheung and White House press secretary Karoline Leavitt signed a memorandum eliminating an office for reporters. Cheung was involved in internal meetings over the Trump administration's handling of the Epstein files, in which he opposed pardoning Ghislaine Maxwell, and in preparation of a war with Iran, in which he stated that overseas conflicts were broadly unpopular but affirmed his support for Trump.

== Communication style ==
Cheung employs a combative style mirroring Donald Trump's own approach to the media. The Atlantic described Cheung's strategy as one of "relentless aggression," and wrote that it "helps quench the base's thirst for lib-owning." Stephanie Grisham, who worked with Cheung in the White House, told NOTUS that he offers "pithy statements that can offend people quickly." In contrast to his predecessors, Cheung's social media posts are often profanity-laden and attack Trump's adversaries. Cheung has referred to various political adversaries and reporters through terms such as "cuck," "dumbass," "dick," and "fucking stupid." He described James Comey, the former director of the Federal Bureau of Investigation, as someone who "might be one of the dumbest motherfuckers in human history," Florida governor Ron DeSantis as a "desperate eunuch", and California governor Gavin Newsom as "a mongoloid who barely registers half a brain cell." According to several reporters, Cheung is cordial in his direct and private communications.

Political offices
Preceded by Ben LaBolt	White House Communications Director; 2025–present	Incumbent
