= Ann Lewis =

American political advisor

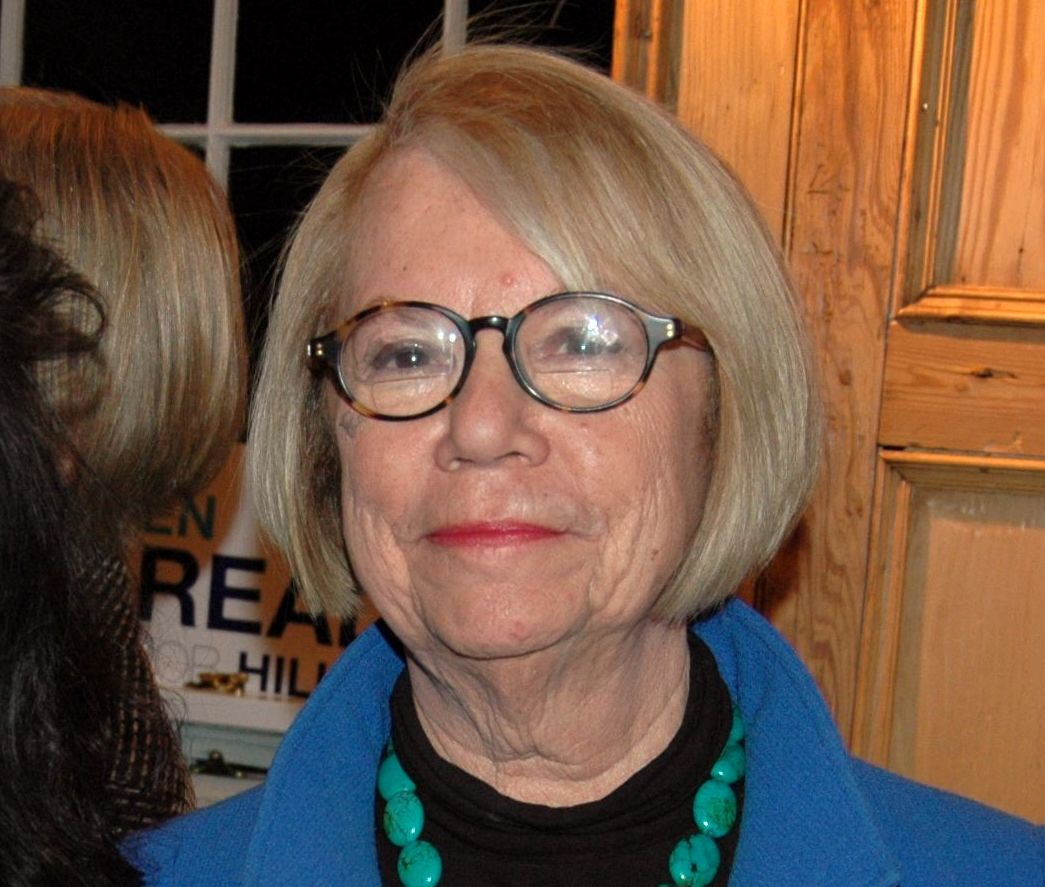

Counselor to the President
- In office March 10, 1999 – January 20, 2001
- President: Bill Clinton
- Preceded by: Paul Begala
- Succeeded by: Karen Hughes

White House Communications Director
- In office July 31, 1997 – March 10, 1999
- President: Bill Clinton
- Preceded by: Donald A. Baer
- Succeeded by: Loretta Ucelli

Personal details
- Born: Ann Frank; December 19, 1937 (age 88) Jersey City, New Jersey, U.S.
- Party: Democratic
- Spouse(s): Gerald Lewis (div. 1968) Myron Sponder
- Relatives: Barney Frank (brother)
- Education: Harvard University (attended)

Ann C. Frank Lewis (born December 19, 1937) is an American Democratic Party strategist. Lewis served as White House Communications Director in the Clinton administration and in senior roles under Hillary Clinton. She was the co-chair and chair emerita of the Democratic Majority for Israel.

== Personal life ==
Lewis was born to a Jewish family in 1937 in Jersey City, New Jersey. She is the older sister of former United States Congressman Barney Frank. She attended Radcliffe College, the former women's college within Harvard University in Cambridge, Massachusetts, but did not graduate. While there, she met Gerald Lewis, whom she married and with whom she subsequently moved to Florida. They divorced in 1968 and Lewis moved back to Massachusetts.

== Career ==
=== Early career ===
From 1994 to 1995, Lewis was the vice president for public policy at the Planned Parenthood Federation of America, where she was responsible for policy, legal and communications initiatives. She has served as the national director of Americans for Democratic Action, as the political director for the Democratic National Committee, and as chief of staff to then Congresswoman Barbara Mikulski.

She served as political director of the Democratic National Committee (DNC) from 1981 to 1985. She worked on the Bill Clinton 1996 presidential campaign and later served as director of communications and counselor to President Bill Clinton in the White House.

=== Hillary Clinton (2000–2008) ===
Lewis served as senior advisor to Hillary Clinton's 2000 campaign for U.S. Senate. She served as director of communications for HillPAC and Friends of Hillary 2005 to 2007. She also served as national chair of the DNC Women's Vote Center, where she led the Democratic Party's major initiative to reach, engage, and mobilize women voters from 2003 to 2004.

==== Hillary Clinton 2008 presidential campaign ====
Lewis was senior advisor for Hillary Clinton's 2008 – 2016 presidential campaign.

Lewis was co-chair for Jewish Women for Hillary 2016.

=== Other work ===
Following the conclusion of Clinton's 2008 presidential campaign, Lewis founded NoLimits.org, an issue-based educational organization encouraging people to support the public policies championed by Clinton. She also served as president of the JAC Education Foundation. In 2001, Lewis was the Richman Visiting professor at Brandeis University.

=== Women's Suffrage Collection ===
Lewis maintains the Ann Lewis Women's Suffrage Collection, an archive of suffrage-related objects and ephemera.

== Affiliations ==
Lewis was a board member of the Jewish Women's Archive. She participated in the 1971 founding meeting of the National Women's Political Caucus in Houston, Texas and was chosen to serve on its operating committee.

Lewis was a supporter of Ready for Hillary, a national grassroots political action committee that organized grassroots support ahead of Hillary Clinton's 2016 presidential campaign.

Lewis is a member of the national advisory board for Emerge America.

Representing Hillary Clinton's campaign in a March 17, 2008 United Jewish Communities forum in Washington, Ann Lewis was quoted as saying "The role of the president of the United States is to support the decisions that are made by the people of Israel. It is not up to us to pick and choose from among the political parties".

== Awards ==
In 2002, Lewis was nominated for an Emmy Award for her work on the script America: A Tribute to Heroes, broadcast on all networks following the September 11 attacks.

In June 2009, Lewis was honored with the inaugural National Jewish Democratic Council's Belle Moskowitz Award in Washington, D.C.

In 2015, Lewis was named as one of The Forward 50.

Political offices
Preceded by Don Baer	White House Director of Communications; 1997–1999	Succeeded by Loretta Ucelli
Preceded by Paul Begala	Counselor to the President; 1999–2001	Succeeded by Karen Hughes
