= Michael Gerson =

American political speechwriter and columnist (1964–2022)

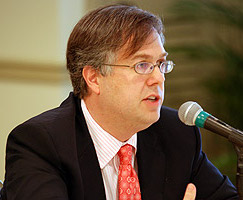
- Gerson in 2014

White House Director of Speechwriting
- In office January 20, 2001 – June 14, 2006
- President: George W. Bush
- Preceded by: Terry Edmonds
- Succeeded by: William McGurn

Personal details
- Born: Michael John Gerson; May 15, 1964 Belmar, New Jersey, U.S.
- Died: November 17, 2022 (aged 58) Washington, D.C., U.S.
- Party: Republican
- Spouse: Dawn Gerson
- Children: 2
- Education: Georgetown University (attended); Wheaton College, Illinois (BA)

Michael John Gerson (May 15, 1964 – November 17, 2022) was an American journalist and speechwriter. He was a neoconservative op-ed columnist for The Washington Post, a Policy Fellow with One Campaign, a visiting fellow with the Center for Public Justice, and a senior fellow at the Council on Foreign Relations. He served as President George W. Bush's chief speechwriter from 2001 until June 2006, as a senior policy advisor from 2000 through June 2006, and was a member of the White House Iraq Group.

Gerson helped write the inaugural address for the second inauguration of George W. Bush, which called for neo-conservative intervention and nation-building around the world to effect the spread of democracy to third world countries.

In 2018, Gerson and commentator Amy Holmes co-hosted In Principle, a politically conservative-oriented television talk show that ran for eight episodes on PBS.

== Early life and education ==
Gerson was born on May 15, 1964, in Belmar, New Jersey, and raised in an Evangelical Christian family in St. Louis, Missouri. He attended Westminster Christian Academy for high school. His paternal grandfather was Jewish. He attended Georgetown University for a year and then transferred to Wheaton College in Illinois, graduating in 1986.

== Career ==
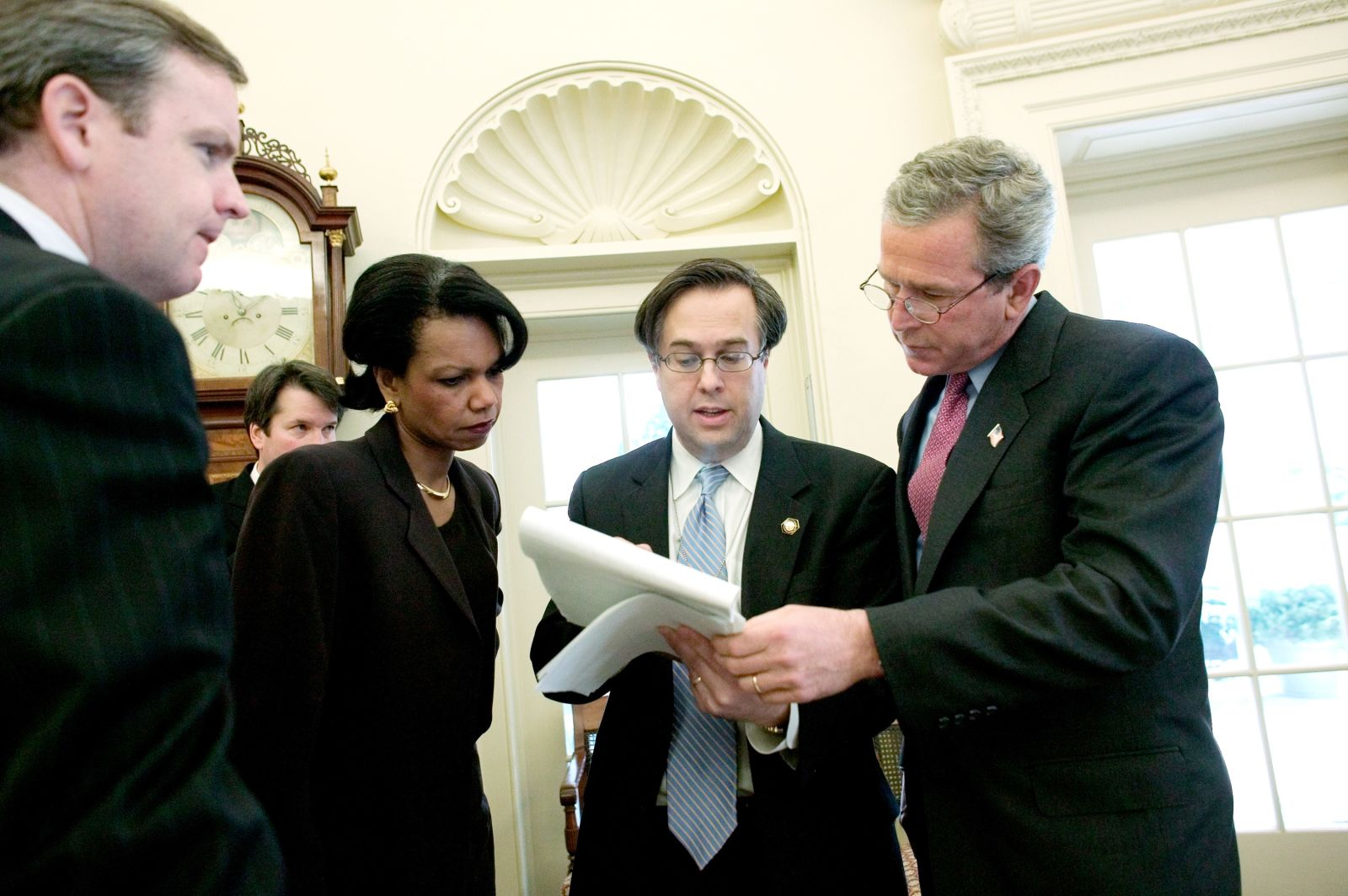
Dan Bartlett, Brett Kavanaugh, Condoleezza Rice, and Gerson review President George W. Bush's State of the Union speech in 2004.

Before joining the Bush administration, he was a senior policy advisor with The Heritage Foundation, a conservative public policy research institution. He also worked at various times as an aide to Indiana Senator Dan Coats and a speechwriter for the presidential campaign of Bob Dole before briefly leaving the political world to cover it as a journalist for U.S. News & World Report. Gerson also worked at one point as a ghostwriter for Charles Colson. In early 1999, Karl Rove recruited Gerson for the Bush campaign.

Gerson was named by Time as one of "The 25 Most Influential Evangelicals In America." The February 7, 2005, issue listed Gerson as the ninth-most influential evangelical that year.

=== Speechwriter ===
Gerson joined the Bush campaign before 2000 as a speechwriter and went on to head the White House speechwriting team. "No one doubts that he did his job exceptionally well," wrote Ramesh Ponnuru in a 2007 article otherwise very critical of Gerson in National Review. According to Ponnuru, Bush's speechwriters had more prominence in the administration than their predecessors did under previous presidents because Bush's speeches did most of the work of defending the president's policies, since administration spokesmen and press conferences did not. On the other hand, he wrote, the speeches would announce new policies that were never implemented, making the speechwriting in some ways less influential than ever.

On June 14, 2006, it was announced that Gerson was leaving the White House to pursue other writing and policy work. He was replaced as Bush's chief speechwriter by The Wall Street Journal chief editor William McGurn.

==== Lines attributed to Gerson ====
Gerson proposed the use of a "smoking gun/mushroom cloud" mixed-metaphor during a September 5, 2002, meeting of the White House Iraq Group, in an effort to sell the American public on the nuclear dangers posed by Saddam Hussein. According to Newsweek columnist Michael Isikoff,

The original plan had been to place it in an upcoming presidential speech, but WHIG members fancied it so much that when the Times reporters contacted the White House to talk about their upcoming piece [about aluminum tubes], one of them leaked Gerson's phrase – and the administration would soon make maximum use of it.

Gerson said one of his favorite speeches was given at the National Cathedral on September 14, 2001, a few days after the September 11 attacks, which included the following passage: "Grief and tragedy and hatred are only for a time. Goodness, remembrance, and love have no end. And the Lord of life holds all who die, and all who mourn."

Gerson was credited with coining such phrases as "the soft bigotry of low expectations" and "the armies of compassion". His noteworthy phrases for Bush are said to include "Axis of Evil," a phrase adapted from "axis of hatred," itself suggested by fellow speechwriter David Frum but deemed too mild.

==== Criticism of Gerson's speechwriting ====
In an article by Matthew Scully, one of Bush's speechwriters, published in The Atlantic in September 2007, Gerson was criticized for seeking the limelight, taking credit for other people's work and creating a false image of himself. "No good deed went unreported, and many things that never happened were reported as fact. For all of our chief speechwriter's finer qualities, the firm adherence to factual narrative is not a strong point." Of particular note is the invention of the phrase "axis of evil." Scully claims that the phrase "axis of hatred" was coined by David Frum and forwarded to colleagues by email. The word "hatred" was changed to "evil" by someone other than Gerson and was changed because "hatred" seemed the more melodramatic word at the time.

Scully also had this to say about Gerson:

My most vivid memory of Mike at Starbucks is one I have labored in vain to shake. We were working on a State of the Union address in John [McConnell]'s office when suddenly Mike was called away for an unspecified appointment, leaving us to 'keep going'. We learned only later, from a chance conversation with his secretary, where he had gone, and it was a piece of Washington self-promotion for the ages: At the precise moment when the State of the Union address was being drafted at the White House by John and me, Mike was off [at a Washington D.C. Starbucks store] pretending to craft the State of the Union in longhand for the benefit of a reporter.

=== Washington Post columnist ===
After leaving the White House, Gerson wrote for Newsweek magazine for a time. On May 16, 2007, Gerson began his tenure as a twice-weekly columnist for The Washington Post. His columns appeared on Wednesdays and Fridays.

Gerson, a neo-conservative, repeatedly criticized other conservatives in his column and conservatives returned the favor. One of Gerson's first columns was entitled "Letting Fear Rule", in which he compared skeptics of President Bush's immigration reform bill to nativist bigots of the 1880s.

In October 2017, Gerson referred to President Donald Trump's "fundamental unfitness for high office" and asked whether he is "psychologically and morally equipped to be president? And could his unfitness cause permanent damage to the country?" He cited "the leaked cries for help coming from within the administration. They reveal a president raging against enemies, obsessed by slights, deeply uninformed and incurious, unable to focus, and subject to destructive whims."

In August 2019, Gerson wrote that it is a "scandal" that "white evangelical Protestants" are not in a state of "panic" about their own demographic decline in the United States. One of the last articles he wrote was an essay on the continuing alliance between evangelical Christians and Donald Trump in 2022 and his belief that such an alliance was foolish and unchristian.

== Personal life ==
Gerson's wife Dawn was born in South Korea. She was adopted by an American family when she was six years old and raised in the Midwestern United States. The couple met in high school, and have two sons. They resided in Northern Virginia.

=== Health and death ===
Gerson suffered from major depressive disorder, and was hospitalized at least once for it.

In 2013, Gerson was diagnosed with kidney cancer. He also had Parkinson's disease. He died from kidney cancer at a Washington, D.C. hospital, on November 17, 2022, at age 58.

== Published works ==
- Gerson, Michael (2007). Heroic Conservatism: Why Republicans Need to Embrace America's Ideals (And Why They Deserve to Fail If They Don't). HarperOne. ISBN 978-0-06-134950-8.
- ——; Peter Wehner (2010). City of Man: Religion and Politics in a New Era. Moody. ISBN 978-0-8024-5857-5.
