= Ken W. Clawson =

American journalist and spokesman for U.S. President Richard Nixon

Ken Clawson

White House Director of Communications
- In office January 30, 1974 – November 4, 1974
- President: Richard Nixon; Gerald Ford
- Preceded by: Herb Klein
- Succeeded by: Jerry Warren

Personal details
- Born: Ken Wade Clawson; August 16, 1936 Monroe, Michigan, U.S.
- Died: December 17, 1999 (aged 63) New Orleans, Louisiana, U.S.
- Party: Republican
- Education: University of Michigan (attended); Bowling Green State University (BA)

Ken Wade Clawson (August 16, 1936 – December 17, 1999) was an American journalist, best known as a spokesman for U.S. President Richard Nixon at the time of the Watergate scandal. He was promoted from Nixon's deputy director of communications to director in early 1974 as the scandal continued to unfold, and following Nixon's resignation in August 1974, Clawson continued in the same role for three months under President Gerald Ford.

== Education and early career ==
Clawson was born into a working-class family in Monroe, Michigan. He attended the University of Michigan, but obtained his undergraduate degree from Bowling Green State University. He became a labor reporter for the Toledo Blade newspaper, and was honored for his work there, winning a Nieman Fellowship to attend Harvard University in 1967. He then joined The Washington Post as a reporter.

== White House staff ==
From 1972 until January 1974 Clawson served as the White House deputy director of communications, under Herbert G. Klein; he succeeded Jeb Stuart Magruder, who had moved to the Committee to Re-Elect the President. From January 30, 1974 to November 4, 1974, he served as Director of the White House Office of Communications.

== The "Canuck letter" ==
Clawson is perhaps best known for an incident which occurred as the Watergate scandal was breaking in late 1972. According to Bob Woodward and Carl Bernstein in their 1974 best-selling book All the President's Men, Clawson bragged about having written the Canuck letter to a friend, Marilyn Berger, who happened to be a Washington Post reporter, whom he had known from his days with the newspaper. Berger passed the information along to Woodward and Bernstein, who were engaged in writing a series of articles in the Post exposing "ratfucking" (dirty tricks) by the Committee to Re-Elect the President (CRP). The Canuck letter was a ploy used to try to disrupt the presidential campaign of Edmund Muskie, who was viewed by many senior Republicans as Nixon's most dangerous potential opponent for the 1972 presidential race. It was published by the Manchester Union Leader, whose publisher, William Loeb III, was a leading Nixon supporter. The ploy was successful and damaged frontrunner Muskie's momentum, causing him to drop out of the race. George McGovern won the Democratic party nomination but was eventually trounced by Nixon in the 1972 election cycle.

Supposedly, when confronted with the information, Clawson tried unsuccessfully to deny it, despite having bragged to Berger about it in the first place. He replied that he did not want Berger revealed as the source, nor did he want made public the circumstances of their conversation, saying it would disrupt his marriage. Clawson had called Berger and was invited to visit her apartment for a drink. He pleaded, unsuccessfully: "I have a wife and a family and a dog and a cat." While the authenticity of this part of the story may be open to some speculation, and was not reported by The Washington Post in its original October 1972 story, it was featured in the 1974 book All the President's Men as well as the 1976 film adaptation of the book.

== Later years ==
In the 1990s, Clawson was the subject of many articles pointing to him as the possible identity of Deep Throat, Bob Woodward's confidential source in the Executive Branch. Woodward's source was conclusively identified in 2005 as being Mark Felt, the second-in-command at the Federal Bureau of Investigation during the investigation into the Watergate scandal.

Clawson died from a heart attack in New Orleans at the age of 63 on December 17, 1999. He was survived by his wife Carol, three living children, his mother and sister, along with six grandchildren. He had suffered from poor health following a stroke in 1975, the year after he left the White House.

Political offices
Preceded by Herb Klein	White House Director of Communications; 1974	Succeeded by Jerry Warren
