= Herb Klein (journalist) =

American journalist and White House official

White House Director of Communications
- In office January 20, 1969 – July 1, 1973
- President: Richard Nixon
- Preceded by: Position established
- Succeeded by: Ken Clawson

Personal details
- Born: Herbert George Klein; April 1, 1918 Los Angeles, California, U.S.
- Died: July 2, 2009 (aged 91) San Diego, California, U.S.
- Party: Republican
- Children: 2 daughters
- Education: University of Southern California (BA)

Military service
- Allegiance: United States
- Years of service: 1946

Herbert George Klein (April 1, 1918 – July 2, 2009), also called Herb Klein, was best known as United States President Richard Nixon's Executive Branch Communications Director. Klein also served as Press Secretary for three of Nixon's campaigns and editor of the Copley Newspapers in San Diego before and after his time in the White House.

== Family life ==
Klein was born on April 1, 1918. He was the son of George J. Klein and Amy Marie Cordes. He married Marjorie G. Galbraith in Long Beach, California, on November 1, 1941. The couple had two daughters. He died aged 91 on July 2, 2009, after suffering a cardiac arrest at his home in La Jolla, California, according to reports from his family.

== Education ==
Klein was a 1935 graduate of Theodore Roosevelt High School (Los Angeles) and earned a B.A. in journalism in 1940 from the University of Southern California, where he was a sports editor for the Daily Trojan.

== Career ==
Prior to his work as a media practitioner, Klein first served in the military. Two years after he graduated from college, he enlisted in the U.S. Navy where he became an officer until 1946. After this stint, he became the news editor of Alhambra Post-Advocate and special correspondent for Copley Newspapers. Klein kept these works until 1950. There was controversy about this part of his career because the Copley Newspaper chain has been rumored to be associated with the Central Intelligence Agency since 1947.

In 1946, while still connected to the Post-Advocate and the Copley Newspapers, Klein was contracted to be the press agent for Richard M. Nixon's campaign for California's 12th congressional district seat. The candidate's victory in this election cemented a relationship with the young California politician. He was chosen to become Nixon's press agent for the California United States Senate seat campaign, which was won against Helen Gahagan Douglas in 1950.

From 1950 to 1968, Klein worked for the San Diego Union serving first as features and editorial writer. He was promoted to editorial page editor, associate editor, and executive editor, before finally rising to the editor position. For the Dwight D. Eisenhower-Nixon California Presidential campaign in 1952, Klein was tapped as the publicity director. During the 1956 reelection campaign, Nixon again selected him as his national assistant press secretary. When Nixon decided to run for the presidency in 1960, Klein became his national press secretary. He was also Nixon's press secretary during his campaign for Governor of California in 1962.

In 1968, Klein served as Nixon's National Communications Manager in his second run for the presidency. After the inauguration in 1969, Klein was chosen to be the new Communications Director for the Executive Branch, a post he held until his resignation on July 1, 1973.

Klein joined the private sector again after his involvement with the Nixon administration. He held the position of vice president of Corporate Relations at Metromedia, Inc. from 1973 to 1977. He became a media consultant from 1977 to 1980 before serving as Copley Press' editor-in-chief until his retirement in 2003.

== Memberships and awards ==
Klein was a National Fellow of the American Enterprise Institute and a member of the American Society of Newspaper Editors, serving on the board of directors from 1966 to 1968. Sigma Delta Chi officer, the national journalism society.

== Publications ==
Klein authored the book Making It Perfectly Clear, an Inside Account of Nixon's Love-Hate Relationship with the Media, released by Doubleday in 1980, ISBN 0-385-14047-9.

== Legacy ==
Klein was a Life Trustee of the University of Southern California, and in 2007, the university established the Herbert G. Klein Lecture Series. The series features lectures at USC and in San Diego. The first lecture, in April 2007, was by J. Stapleton Roy, former U.S. Ambassador to China. The second, in San Diego, was by Tom Johnson, former Los Angeles Times publisher and CNN executive. The April 2008 lecture at USC was by Clark T. Randt, Jr., then U.S. Ambassador to China. Klein helped advise the university as it launched its influential U.S.-China Institute. Klein did much to support USC's efforts to become a global university.

Political offices
New office	White House Director of Communications; January 20, 1969 – July 1, 1973	Succeeded by Ken Clawson
