= Kevin Sullivan (communications professional) =

Former White House Communications Director

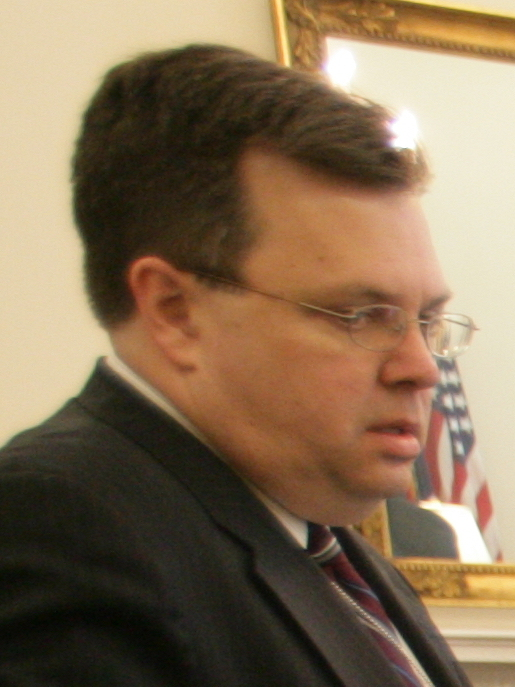

White House Communications Director
- In office July 24, 2006 – January 20, 2009
- President: George W. Bush
- Preceded by: Nicolle Wallace
- Succeeded by: Ellen Moran

Personal details
- Born: November 9, 1958 (age 68) Evergreen Park, Illinois, U.S.
- Party: Republican
- Education: Purdue University (BS); Iona College (MA)

Kevin Sullivan (born November 9, 1958) was the White House Communications Director, also known as the Assistant to the President for Communications, from July 24, 2006, until January 20, 2009. From April 2005 to July 2006 he was the Assistant Secretary for Communications and Outreach at the United States Department of Education.

== Biography ==
=== Education ===
Sullivan was born in Evergreen Park, Illinois. He earned a Bachelor of Science in management from Purdue University and earned an MA in mass communication from Iona College, New Rochelle, New York. He serves as an advisor to The Global War on Terrorism Memorial Foundation.

=== Professional career ===
Before his role in the White House, Sullivan was assistant secretary for communications at the Department of Education. He had previously worked as a chief spokesperson and media relations executive at NBC Universal. He has a background in sports public relations for NBC and prior to that for the Dallas Mavericks of the National Basketball Association. Sullivan was recognized five times by the media as Outstanding Public Relations Director in the NBA's Western Conference and received the NBA's 2004 Splaver/McHugh Tribute to Excellence Award.

In January 2009, he was replaced by Ellen Moran when President Barack Obama took office.

Following his departure from the White House Sullivan founded Kevin Sullivan Communications, a strategic communications consulting firm. He was a frequent guest co-host of "Polioptics," during the political communications show's run on SiriusXM's POTUS channel.

== Publications ==
- Breaking Through: Communications Lessons From the Locker Room, the Board Room & the Oval Office, digital book, 2015 ASIN B00ZJQKJGA

== Sources ==
- President Bush Appoints Kevin Sullivan as Assistant to the President for Communications, White House press release, 11 July 2006
- https://www.ksullivancommunications.com/our-team

Political offices
Preceded by Nicolle Wallace	White House Communications Director; 2006–2009	Succeeded by Ellen Moran
