= Nicolle Wallace =

American TV political commentator (born 1972)

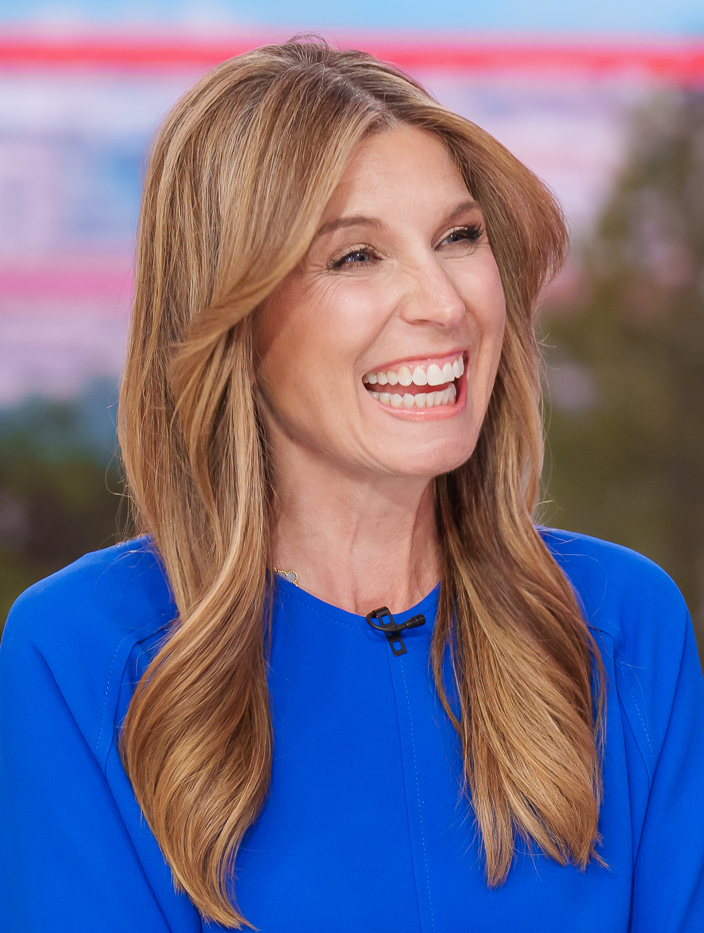
- Wallace in 2023

White House Communications Director
- In office January 5, 2005 – July 24, 2006
- President: George W. Bush
- Preceded by: Dan Bartlett
- Succeeded by: Kevin Sullivan

Personal details
- Born: Nicolle Devenish; February 4, 1972 (age 54) Orange County, California, U.S.
- Party: Republican (before 2021)
- Spouses: Mark Wallace (m. 2005; div. 2019); Michael S. Schmidt (m. 2022)
- Children: 2
- Education: University of California, Berkeley (BA); Northwestern University (MS)

Nicolle Wallace (née Devenish; born February 4, 1972) is an American television political commentator and author. She is the anchor of the MS NOW news and politics program Deadline: White House and a former co-host of the ABC daytime talk show The View. Wallace is a political analyst for MS NOW and NBC News. She was previously a frequent on-air contributor to the programs Today, The 11th Hour with Stephanie Ruhle, and Morning Joe.

Wallace served as the White House Communications Director during the second term of the presidency of George W. Bush, having been the Communications Director for his 2004 re-election campaign. She was a senior advisor for John McCain's 2008 presidential campaign. Additionally, she has authored the contemporary political novels Eighteen Acres, It's Classified, and Madam President.

== Early life, family, and education ==
Nicolle Devenish was born on February 4, 1972, in Orange County, California, to Clive and Veronica (née Zadis) Devenish. She is of English and Greek descent. Her mother was a teacher's assistant for third grade in public schools, and her father was an antiques dealer. Her grandfather Thomas Devenish was a Manhattan antiques dealer, part of Devenish and Company. Nicolle has three younger siblings: Zachary, Courtney, and Ashley. They were raised in Orinda, California, a mostly wealthy San Francisco Bay Area suburb.

After graduating in 1990 from Miramonte High School, Wallace earned a B.A. in mass communications in 1994 from the University of California, Berkeley. Thereafter, she attended Medill School of Journalism at Northwestern University, earning a master's degree in 1996.

== Political career ==
Briefly an on-air reporter in California, Wallace started her political career working in California state politics for Republican Leader, Assemblyman Scott Baugh, who represented California's 67th State Assembly district. In 1999, she moved to Florida to serve as Governor Jeb Bush's press secretary and then became the Communications Director for the Florida State Technology Office in 2000. Wallace worked on the 2000 Florida election recount.

=== White House and Bush 2004 presidential campaign ===
Wallace joined the White House staff during George W. Bush's first term, serving as special assistant to the President and director of media affairs, where she oversaw regional press strategy and outreach. In 2003, Wallace joined Bush's 2004 presidential campaign as its communications director, wherein according to The New York Times she "delivered her political attacks without snarling."

On January 5, 2005, Bush named Wallace White House Communications Director. The New York Times story announcing her presidential appointment carried the headline: "New Aide Aims to Defrost the Press Room" and described Wallace's intentions "to improve the contentious relationship between a secretive White House and the press." According to The Washington Post, Wallace served as "a voice for more openness with reporters", and former colleagues describe Wallace as having been "very persuasive in the halls of the West Wing." She left the White House in July 2006 to relocate to New York City, where her husband Mark was representing the Bush administration at the United Nations. Her White House colleague, presidential political advisor Mark McKinnon, called her a "rare talent in politics."

=== McCain 2008 presidential campaign ===
Wallace served as a senior advisor for the John McCain 2008 presidential campaign. She appeared frequently on network and cable news programs as the campaign's top spokesperson and defender. In late October 2008, campaign aides criticized vice-presidential candidate Sarah Palin. One unnamed McCain aide said Palin had "gone rogue," placing her own perceived future political interests ahead of the McCain–Palin ticket, directly contradicting her running mate's positions, and disobeying campaign managers' directions. In response to reports of dissension within the McCain–Palin campaign, Wallace issued a statement to both Politico and CNN saying, "If people want to throw me under the bus, my personal belief is that the most honorable thing to do is to lie there."

Wallace was portrayed by Sarah Paulson in the 2012 film Game Change. Wallace described the film as highly credible, saying the film "captured the spirit and emotion of the campaign." Wallace also told ABC News Chief Political Correspondent George Stephanopoulos that the film was "true enough to make me squirm". Eight years after the election, Wallace stated that she did not vote for a presidential candidate in 2008 because Palin gave her "serious pause".

== Media career ==
=== White House novel series ===
She is the author of the 2010 novel Eighteen Acres (a reference to the 18 acres on which the White House complex sits), a fictional narrative about three powerful women at the top of their careers: the first female U.S. president (named Charlotte Kramer), her chief of staff, and a White House correspondent. Wallace said, "It's my best attempt at a story that I hope people will pick up and read and enjoy and maybe feel like they're getting to see what it's really like in the White House in this entirely fictional story."

Patrick Anderson of The Washington Post wrote, "To say that Nicolle Wallace's Eighteen Acres is one of the best novels I've read about life in the White House may be faint praise—there haven't been many good ones—but her book is both an enjoyable read and a serious look at what high-level political pressures do to people." Craig Wilson of USA Today wrote, "Nicolle Wallace actually knows what she's talking about" and Ashley Parker of The New York Times called the book "an engaging, easy read." TV personalities, such as George Stephanopoulos, Rachel Maddow, John King, and Andrea Mitchell, also praised Eighteen Acres. In September 2011, Wallace published the sequel to Eighteen Acres, It's Classified, about a fictional presidential campaign troubled by a mentally ill vice presidential candidate. Wallace said the premise was inspired by her experience as a senior adviser to the McCain/Palin campaign. Her third novel, Madam President, was released in April 2015.

=== Television ===
Since May 9, 2017, Wallace has been the anchor of the afternoon news and opinion program Deadline: White House, which airs on MS NOW (known as MSNBC until August 2025).

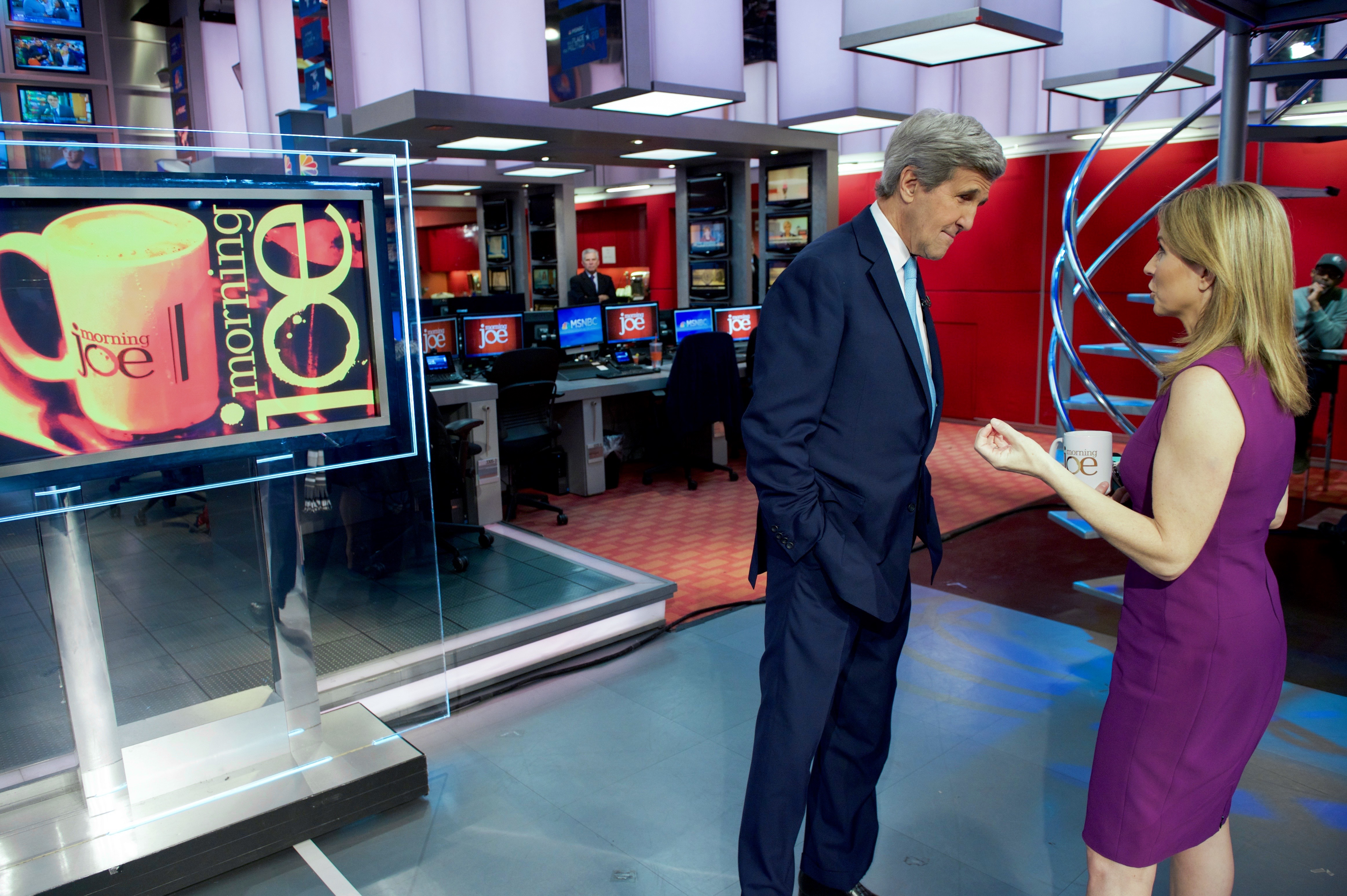
Wallace chats with John Kerry in April 2016

On September 3, 2014, ABC announced Wallace would join The View as a new co-host alongside newcomer Rosie Perez. Wallace made her debut as a co-host on the premiere of the series' 18th season on September 15, 2014. Wallace exited the series at the end of the season.

Following her departure from The View, Wallace joined NBC News and its cable network MSNBC as a political analyst. She was also a frequent contributor and guest host on MSNBC programs The 11th Hour with Brian Williams and Morning Joe as well as on NBC's Today Show. In November 2016, Wallace served as an analyst for MSNBC's live coverage of election results, which was anchored by Brian Williams, Rachel Maddow, and Chris Matthews. Since May 9, 2017, Wallace has been the anchor of the afternoon news and opinion program Deadline: White House on MSNBC. Deadline: White House garnered a total of 2 million viewers in July 2020, and in the following month, it was expanded to two hours.

Wallace was an executive producer on the July 3, 2022, MSNBC primetime special "Ukraine: Answering the Call", a fundraiser to support Ukraine during the 2022 invasion by Russia.

== Podcast ==
In late May 2025, MSNBC announced the debut of a new podcast hosted by Wallace. It was called The Best People, and each week, it features Wallace sitting down for an interview with a news-maker from the media, or sports, or technology, or the entertainment industry. Wallace's goal was to have informative conversations, many of which were not political, with people she believed her audience would find interesting. Among her first scheduled guests were Jason Bateman, Sarah Jessica Parker, Jimmy Jam, Joan Baez, and Doc Rivers.

== Personal life ==
Wallace married American businessman, former diplomat, and lawyer Mark Wallace in 2005. In 2011, the couple had a son. In February 2013, both Wallace and her husband publicly supported the legalization of same-sex marriage in an amicus curiae brief submitted to the U.S. Supreme Court. She and Mark divorced in 2019.

Wallace described herself as a "self-loathing former Republican" in March 2021. In April 2022, she married The New York Times journalist Michael S. Schmidt. In November 2023, Wallace announced that she and her husband had just welcomed a daughter, born via surrogate.

== Published works ==
- Wallace, Nicolle (2010). Eighteen Acres: A Novel. Atria Books. ISBN 978-1439194829.
- Wallace, Nicolle (2011). It's Classified: A Novel. Atria Books. ISBN 978-1451610963.
- Wallace, Nicolle (2015). Madam President: A Novel. Atria Books/Emily Bestler Books. ISBN 978-1476756899.

Political offices
Preceded by Dan Bartlett	White House Director of Communications; 2005–2006	Succeeded by Kevin Sullivan
Media offices
Preceded by Jenny McCarthy; Sherri Shepherd; Barbara Walters	The View co-host 2014–2015	Succeeded by Joy Behar; Candace Cameron Bure; Michelle Collins; Paula Faris
