= Ben LaBolt =

American political advisor (born 1981)

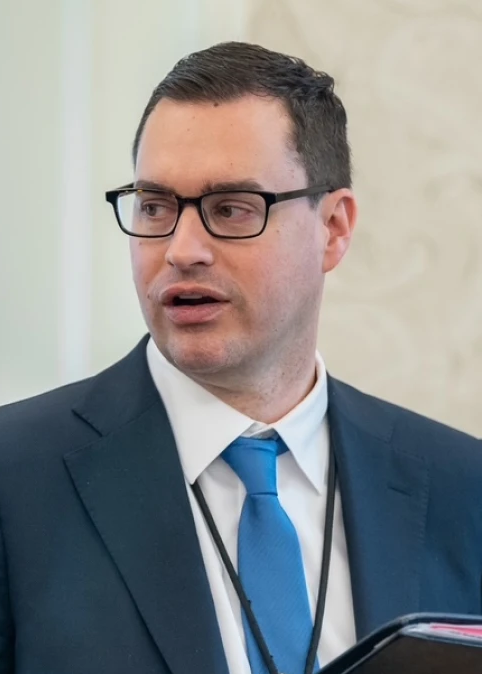
- LaBolt in 2024

Senior Advisor to the President for Communications
- In office August 8, 2024 – January 20, 2025
- President: Joe Biden
- Preceded by: Anita Dunn

White House Communications Director
- In office March 1, 2023 – January 20, 2025
- President: Joe Biden
- Deputy: Kate Berner; Kristen Orthman; Herbie Ziskend
- Preceded by: Kate Bedingfield
- Succeeded by: Steven Cheung

Personal details
- Born: August 20, 1981 (age 45) Illinois, U.S.
- Party: Democratic
- Education: Middlebury College (BA)

Ben LaBolt (born August 20, 1981) is a political advisor. He served as the White House Communications Director for President Joe Biden, succeeding Kate Bedingfield in the role when she stepped down at the end of February 2023. In August 2024, LaBolt was promoted to Senior Advisor to the President, succeeding Anita Dunn after her departure. After leaving the White House, LaBolt joined Bully Pulpit International as President.

Previously, LaBolt served as deputy White House Press Secretary in the Obama administration and worked on presidential campaigns for Barack Obama and Howard Dean, as well as for Jan Schakowsky, Sherrod Brown, and Rahm Emanuel.

== Early life ==
LaBolt was born August 20, 1981. He is from La Grange, Illinois. He graduated from Lyons Township High School and Middlebury College, earning a bachelor's degree in political science in 2003. At Middlebury, he was president of the College Democrats and volunteered on governor of Vermont Howard Dean's 2000 reelection campaign.

== Career ==
LaBolt's first job out of college was for Dean's 2004 presidential campaign. He worked as the press secretary for U.S. Representative Jan Schakowsky, for Sherrod Brown's 2006 Senate campaign, and for Barack Obama's Senate office.

After working as then-Sen. Obama's press secretary, LaBolt served as Obama's senior national spokesman during the 2008 presidential campaign. He joined the White House team as assistant press secretary, specializing in justice, energy, and the environment, as well as spokesman for the White House Counsel, and helping with the confirmation efforts of Justices Sonia Sotomayor and Elena Kagan.

In October 2010, LaBolt became communications director for Rahm Emanuel during the 2011 Chicago mayoral election. After the campaign, he served as the national press secretary for Obama's 2012 presidential campaign, building the communications team from the ground up and served as the on-camera spokesperson.

In June 2013, LaBolt and Robert Gibbs co-founded a strategic communications practice called The Incite Agency, which later merged with Bully Pulpit International (BPI). LaBolt became a partner at BPI. There, he advised high-growth startups such as Instacart, Airbnb, Sonos, Uber, Coinbase, Meta, Google, YouTube, Bloomberg Philanthropies, and others.

LaBolt worked on the presidential transition of Joe Biden following the 2020 United States presidential election and as head of communications for the Ketanji Brown Jackson Supreme Court nomination in 2022. He succeeded Kate Bedingfield as White House Communications Director on March 1, 2023. In August 2024, LaBolt was promoted to Senior Advisor to the President, taking on broad strategy and advising the president.

Following the end of the Biden administration in 2025, LaBolt rejoined Bully Pulpit. In his new role as President at BPI, he supports international communications and policy priorities, shares BPI's point of view at events and meetings around the world, and leverages his public- and private-sector relationships to grow the business.

== Personal life ==
LaBolt is openly gay, and is the first openly gay White House Communications Director. Growing up, he was trained at the Players Workshop of The Second City and in college he was a member of the Otter Nonsense Players, which has spawned a number of writers for late night show hosts from David Letterman to Stephen Colbert.

Government offices
Preceded by Kate Bedingfield	White House Communications Director; 2023–2025	Succeeded by Steven Cheung
