= Michael S. Schmidt =

American journalist and author (born 1983)

Michael Schmidt
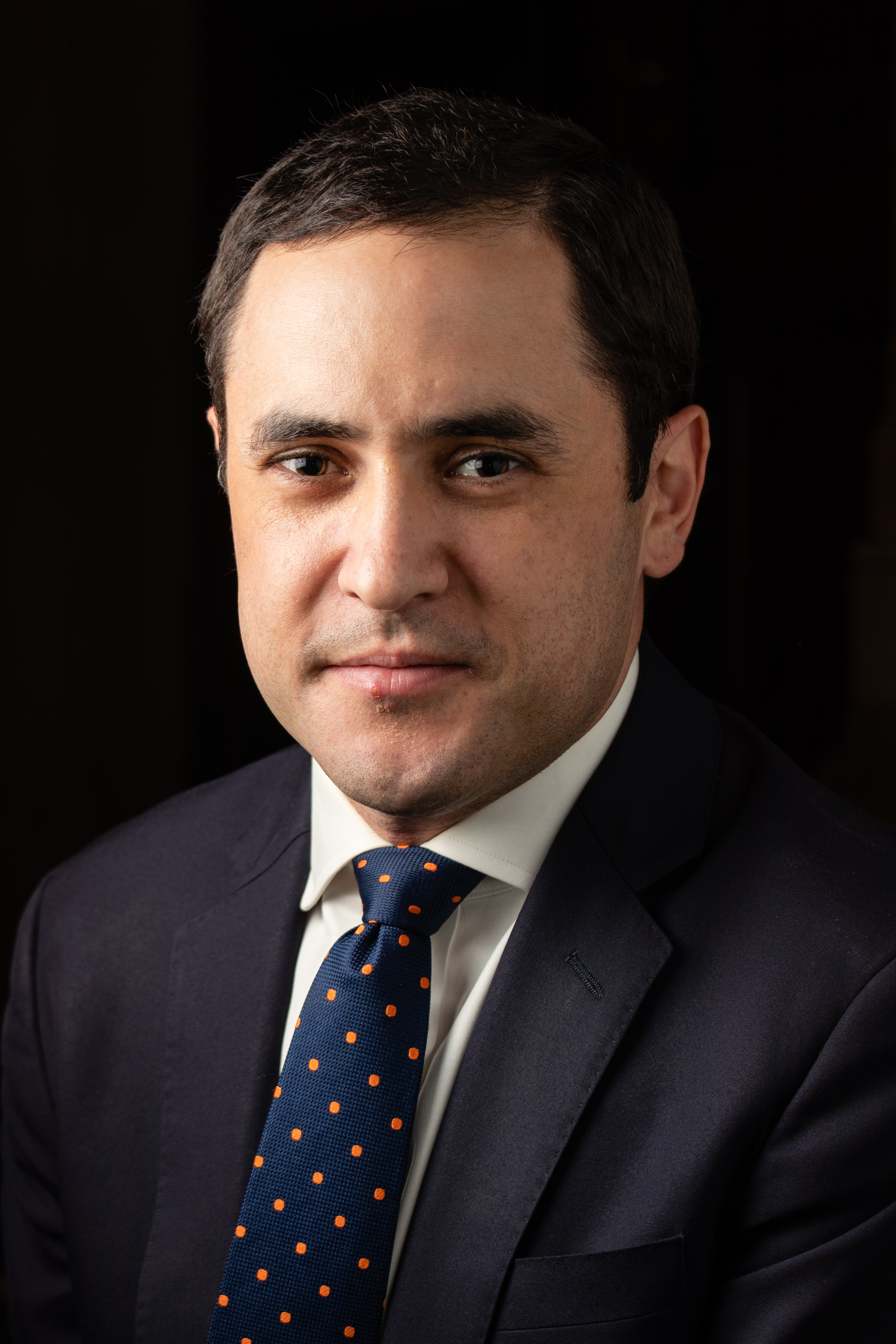
- Schmidt in 2018
- Born: September 23, 1983 (age 43); Nyack, New York, United States
- Education: Lafayette College (AB)
- Occupations: Journalist, author
- Spouse: Nicolle Wallace (m. 2022)
- Children: 1 daughter

Michael S. Schmidt (born September 23, 1983) is an American journalist, author, television producer and correspondent for The New York Times in Washington, D.C. He covers national security and federal law enforcement, has broken several high-profile stories about politics, media and sports and has won two Pulitzer prizes. He is also a national security contributor for MS Now.

Among the major stories he has broken was the existence of a private email server used by Hillary Clinton. During the Trump presidency, he broke several major stories including details of the Mueller investigation, investigations of Trump and Trump's efforts to overturn the election and Trump's attempts to weaponize the federal government against his enemies. He also has written extensively about Trump's retribution campaign against universities and law firms and the efforts by those around Trump to contain him during his first term.

In June 2026, he broke the story that the Ultimate Fighting Championship star Conor McGregor used performance-enhancing drugs and was supported in doing that by Neal ElAttrache, the Dodgers team doctor and one of the most high profile doctors in sports. In 2024, he broke the story that nearly two dozen elite Chinese swimmers -- including gold medalist -- secretly tested positive for banned drugs.

Schmidt was among a group of four New York Times reporters Trump sued in Sept. 2025 for $15 billion.Trump sued Schmidt for publishing an interview with former White House chief of staff John Kelly on the brink of the 2024 election in which Kelly said Trump met the definition of a fascist. Schmidt was later dropped from the suit.

In 2023, he broke the story about the contents of text messages sent by Tucker Carlson that led to his ouster at Fox.

In 2018, Schmidt won two Pulitzer Prizes for his work in the previous year. One of the Pulitzer Prizes was awarded for breaking the news that President Trump had asked the FBI director James Comey for a loyalty pledge and to close the federal investigation into Michael Flynn. That story led the Justice Department to appoint Robert S. Mueller III as a special counsel to investigate President Trump.

With Emily Steel at The New York Times, Schmidt won a Pulitzer Prize for a story about sexual harassment allegations against Fox News personality Bill O'Reilly that led to Fox firing O'Reilly. He shared the 2018 Pulitzer Prize for Public Service and the 2018 Gerald Loeb Award for Investigative business journalism for stories on the sexual predator allegations against film producer Harvey Weinstein that led to the rise of the Me Too movement.

In 2025, Netflix released "Zero Day," a limited series starring Robert De Niro that Schmidt co-created and served as an executive producer on.

In September 2020, Schmidt's first book, Donald Trump v. The United States: Inside the Struggle to Stop a President, was released by Penguin Random House. The book received positive reviews and rose to number three on The New York Times Best Seller list and number two on both Amazon's and the Wall Street Journal 's best-seller lists.

Earlier in Schmidt's career, he was a sports reporter and broke several major stories about doping in baseball including that Sammy Sosa, David Ortiz and Manny Ramirez had tested positive for performance-enhancing drugs.

== Early life and education ==
Schmidt was born to a Jewish family in Nyack, New York. His parents are Rachel and James Schmidt, a wealth manager. Michael Schmidt went to high school at John Randolph Tucker High School in Richmond, Virginia, where he played baseball. He graduated from Lafayette College in Easton, Pennsylvania in 2005 with an AB in international affairs while also co-founding and editing Marooned with classmate Erin Koen.

== Career ==
In 2004, Schmidt worked at The Boston Globe.

Schmidt began working for The New York Times as a news clerk in 2005. In December 2007, he was made a staff reporter, covering performance-enhancing drugs and legal issues in sports.

In 2009, Schmidt broke the stories that David Ortiz, Manny Ramirez and Sammy Sosa were among the roughly 100 players who tested positive for a performance-enhancing drug in 2003.

In 2010, Schmidt broke the story about how the firm of baseball super agent Scott Boras had provided tens of thousands of dollars in loans to a young prospect, raising questions about whether Boras' firm had broken rules designed to prevent players from being exploited.

Schmidt was a correspondent for The Times in Iraq during 2011. During his time in Iraq, he uncovered a series of classified documents in a junkyard in Baghdad. The documents were testimony from Marines about the 2005 Haditha Massacre. In that incident, the Marines had killed 26 Iraqi civilians. An Iraqi junkyard attendant had used other classified American documents to cook smoked carp. The story, which ran as American troops were leaving Iraq in 2011, was widely praised.

In May 2015, Schmidt was part of a group of Times reporters who broke a series of stories about the Justice Department charging FIFA executives. Schmidt was in the lobby of a hotel in Switzerland when law enforcement officers arrested the executives.

In December 2015, a New York Times story by Schmidt and Matt Apuzzo (written together with Julia Preston) criticized the US government for missing crucial evidence during the visa vetting process for Tashfeen Malik, who would later become one of the shooters in the 2015 San Bernardino attack. The director of the FBI dismissed the reporting as "garble" and it turned out that rather than having "talked openly on social media about her views on violent jihad" as stated in the article, she had mentioned these in private communications. The New York Times' public editor called for "systemic changes" after these articles by Schmidt and his coauthors (both of which had relied on anonymous government sources).

Schmidt has been one of the Times' lead reporters on the federal and Congressional investigations into connections between Donald Trump's associates and the Russians. On March 5, 2017, Schmidt broke the story that the FBI director James Comey had asked the Justice Department to publicly refute Trump's false claims that President Obama had him wire-tapped during the 2016 campaign. Schmidt also broke several other stories about the Trump presidency, including that Trump ordered his chief of staff, John Kelly, to give his son-in-law, Jared Kushner, a security clearance despite widespread concerns in the intelligence community about Kushner having access to the country's most closely guarded secrets.

=== Clinton email story ===
In March 2015, Schmidt broke the story that Hillary Clinton had exclusively used a personal email account when she was secretary of state. The story said that Clinton "may have violated federal requirements that officials' correspondence be retained as part of the agency's record." In response to the story, Clinton announced that she would release all of her work related emails from her time in office.

After breaking the story, he was the lead reporter covering the Hillary Clinton email controversy. Defenders of Hillary Clinton have said that Schmidt's coverage of her was not fair and he has been frequently criticized by the group Media Matters and other liberals. After breaking the Clinton email story, Media Matters's founder and chairman, David Brock, wrote an open letter to The New York Times about the story, asking for a "prominent correction as soon as possible". The Times did not run a correction. The inspector general for the State Department said in May 2016 that Clinton's use of the account had violated State Department's record keeping policies.

=== Comey–Trump story ===
On May 16, 2017, Schmidt broke the story that James Comey, the former FBI director in the Trump Administration, had written an FBI memo detailing President Donald Trump's alleged ordering of Comey to end the FBI's investigation of Michael Flynn prior to the conclusion of the investigation's findings. The story led the Justice Department to appoint the former FBI director Robert Mueller to investigate Trump, which eventually produced the Mueller report. Emails and text messages released in November 2025 show Comey encouraging friend and law professor Daniel Richman to serve as an anonymous proxy source for Schmidt's reporting.

== Personal life ==
In April 2022, he married American cable TV news anchor Nicolle Wallace. In November 2023, they welcomed a baby girl via a surrogate.

== Bibliography ==
- Donald Trump v. The United States: Inside the Struggle to Stop a President (Penguin Random House, 2020, ISBN 978-1-9848-5468-1)
