= Ellen Moran =

Former White House Communications DirectorEdit

White House Communications Director
- In office January 20, 2009 – April 21, 2009
- President: Barack Obama
- Preceded by: Kevin Sullivan
- Succeeded by: Anita Dunn (acting)

Personal details
- Born: May 1, 1966 (age 60) Troy, New York, U.S.
- Party: Democratic
- Education: Wheaton College, Massachusetts (BA)

Ellen Moran (born May 1, 1966) is the Vice-Chancellor for Strategic Communications and Marketing at the University of Pittsburgh. She previously served as Chief of Staff at the US Department of Commerce under Secretary Gary Locke from April 2009 to August 2011. She previously held the position of White House Communications Director. Her predecessor was Kevin Sullivan, who held the position under the Bush administration. Prior to her post at the White House, she was executive director of EMILY's List.

== Biography ==
=== Early life and education ===
A native of Amherst, Massachusetts, Moran holds a degree in political science and English literature from Wheaton College.

=== Professional career ===
Before joining White House staff, Moran was executive director of EMILY's List, where she oversaw the national staff and charted the overall strategic direction of the organisation to provide financial assistance to female candidates in the Democratic Party who take liberal, pro-choice political stances. This was Moran's second tenure at EMILY's List, rejoining the organisation from the AFL-CIO, where she coordinated Wal-Mart corporate accountability activities and served in the Political Department. In 2004, she took a leave of absence from the AFL-CIO to direct independent expenditures for the Democratic National Committee, managing placement of presidential advertising and directed television, radio, mail, and phoning efforts in 20 states. In 2000, Moran directed the Democratic Congressional Campaign Committee's $50 million issue advocacy campaign.

Moran's political experience includes managing campaigns for governor, US Senate, and US House of Representatives; working on the national campaign staff of Tom Harkin's 1992 presidential campaign; helping plan both Clinton inaugurals; and conducting international democracy work in Indonesia for the US Agency for International Development. In 1993, Moran designed EMILY's List's campaign staff training program and served as its first director. Moran also oversaw EMILY's List's first foray into voter mobilisation in 1994.

==== Obama administration ====
She was announced as the new White House Communications Director on November 22, 2008.

On April 21, she announced she would resign her post to accept the position of Chief of Staff to the Secretary of Commerce.

== University of Pittsburgh ==
On May 2, 2018, Moran became the Vice-Chancellor for Strategic Communications and Marketing at the University of Pittsburgh.

Political offices
Preceded by Kevin Sullivan	White House Communications Director; 2009	Succeeded by Anita Dunn; Acting
