= What Happened (McClellan book) =

2008 memoir by Scott McClellan

What Happened: Inside the Bush White House and Washington's Culture of Deception
- First edition cover
- Author: Scott McClellan
- Language: English
- Genre: Memoir
- Publisher: PublicAffairs
- Publication date: June 2, 2008
- Publication place: United States
- Media type: Print (hardback)
- Pages: 400
- ISBN: 978-1-58648-556-6
- Dewey Decimal: 973.931 22
- LC Class: E902 .M393 2008

What Happened: Inside the Bush White House and Washington's Culture of Deception is an autobiographical bestseller by Scott McClellan, who served as White House Press Secretary from 2003 until 2006 under President George W. Bush. The book was scheduled to be released on June 2, 2008; however, excerpts were released to the press a week before publication. The book quickly became a media sensation for its candid, insider's critique of the Bush administration and ran as a leading story on most top news outlets days after the content became public. It was listed as a number-one bestseller by The New York Times and on Amazon.com when it first went on sale.

== Content ==
McClellan harshly criticizes the Bush administration over its Iraq war-making campaign, though he writes in detail about his personal admiration for President Bush. He accuses Bush of "self-deception" and of maintaining a "permanent campaign approach" to governing, rather than making the best choices. McClellan stops short of saying Bush purposely lied about his reasons for invading Iraq (in fact, stating flatly that he did not believe that Bush would intentionally lie), writing that the administration was not "employing out-and-out deception" to make the case for war in 2002, though he does assert the administration relied on an aggressive "political propaganda campaign" instead of the truth to sell the Iraq War. The book is also critical of the press corps for being too accepting of the administration's perspective on the Iraq War, and of Condoleezza Rice for being "too accommodating" and overly careful about protecting her own reputation.

== Reaction ==
McClellan's transformation from White House Press Secretary to prominent critic was a shock to most political observers, and his public changeover "startled Washington".

=== White House reaction ===
The Bush administration issued a statement about the book through McClellan's successor, Press Secretary Dana Perino, who said, "Scott, we now know, is disgruntled about his experience at the White House. We are puzzled. It is sad. This is not the Scott we knew." The administration additionally took exception to the claim that they had misled the nation in the lead-up to the war in Iraq, as Perino said, "He's suggesting that we purposely misled. There is no new evidence of that."

=== Congressional reaction ===
In response to the claims made by McClellan in the book, Congressmen Robert Wexler (D-FL) and Jerry Nadler (D-NY), then the Chair of the House Judiciary Subcommittee on the Constitution, Civil Rights and Civil Liberties, called upon McClellan to testify under oath in front of Congress. McClellan testified publicly under oath before the House Judiciary Committee in July 2008.

== McClellan response ==
McClellan has responded by stating that his role as Deputy White House Press Secretary during the lead-up to the Iraq War was not to make policy, contending that he was inclined to give the Administration the "benefit of the doubt" like most Americans, and that he did not fully appreciate the circumstances until after leaving the "White House bubble" and being able to reflect with a more clear-eyed view of events.

== Sales ==
While McClellan's book advance was for a comparatively low $75,000, What Happened reached the number-one position on the sales chart of Amazon.com, and its printing was quadrupled to more than 300,000 copies by its publisher, PublicAffairs.
