= White House Communications Director =

U.S. presidential staff member in charge of the White House's media campaign

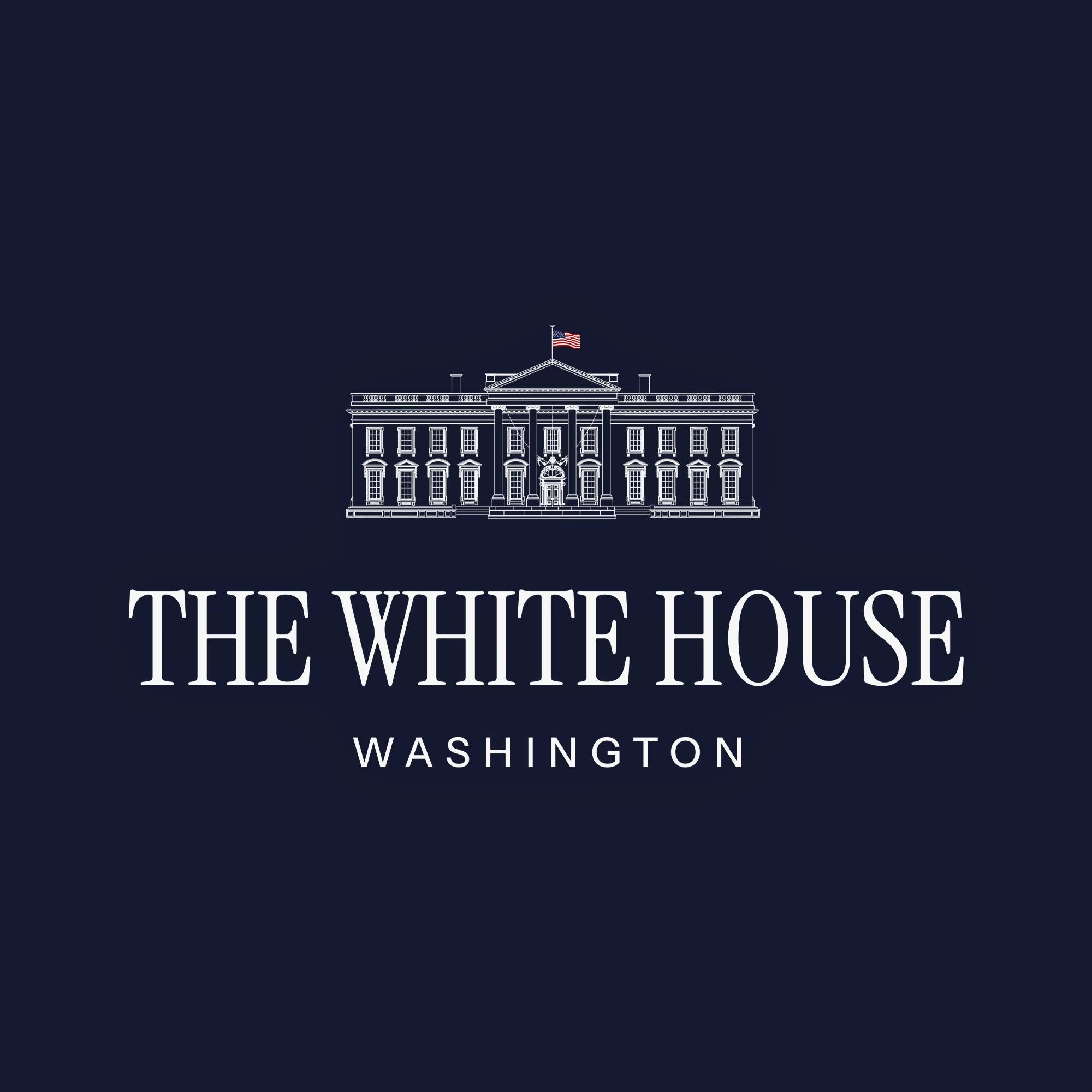

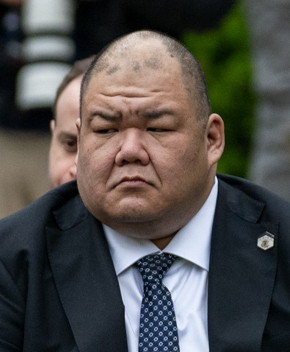
- Incumbent; Steven Cheung since January 20, 2025
- Executive Office of the President; White House Office
- Reports to: White House Chief of Staff
- Appointer: President of the United States
- Formation: 1969 (White House Office); 1974 (White House Office of the Press Secretary)
- First holder: Herbert G. Klein

The White House communications director, known officially as Assistant to the President for Communications, is part of the senior staff of the president of the United States. The officeholder is responsible for developing and promoting the agenda of the president and leading its media campaign.

The director, along with their staff, works on major political speeches such as the inaugural address and the State of the Union Address. The communications director, who is appointed by and serves at the pleasure of the president, without the need for United States Senate confirmation, is usually given an office in the West Wing of the White House.

== History ==
The White House Office of Communications was established by Herbert G. Klein in January 1969 during the Nixon administration. It was separate from the Office of the Press Secretary from 1969 to 1974.

== Key staff ==
- Assistant to the President and Senior Advisor to the President and White House Communications Director: Steven Cheung
- Assistant to the President and Senior Advisor to the President and White House Press Secretary: Vacant

== List of directors ==
Denotes acting capacity.

| Image | Name | Start | End | Duration | Ref(s) | President |
|---|---|---|---|---|---|---|
| | Herb Klein | January 20, 1969 | July 1, 1973 | 4 years, 162 days | | Richard Nixon (1969–1974) |
| | Ken Clawson | January 30, 1974 | August 9, 1974 | 191 days | | Richard Nixon (1969–1974) |
| | Ken Clawson | August 9, 1974 | November 4, 1974 | 87 days | | Gerald Ford (1974–1977) |
| | Jerry Warren | November 4, 1974 | August 15, 1975 | 284 days | | Gerald Ford (1974–1977) |
| | Margita White | August 15, 1975 | July 12, 1976 | 332 days | | Gerald Ford (1974–1977) |
| | David Gergen | July 12, 1976 | January 20, 1977 | 192 days | | Gerald Ford (1974–1977) |
| | Gerald Rafshoon | July 1, 1978 | August 14, 1979 | 1 year, 44 days | | Jimmy Carter (1977–1981) |
| | Frank Ursomarso | February 23, 1981 | June 17, 1981 | 114 days | | Ronald Reagan (1981–1989) |
| | David Gergen | June 17, 1981 | January 15, 1984 | 2 years, 212 days | | Ronald Reagan (1981–1989) |
| | Michael McManus | January 15, 1984 | February 6, 1985 | 1 year, 22 days | | Ronald Reagan (1981–1989) |
| | Pat Buchanan | February 6, 1985 | March 1, 1987 | 2 years, 23 days | | Ronald Reagan (1981–1989) |
| | Jack Koehler | March 1, 1987 | March 13, 1987 | 11 days | | Ronald Reagan (1981–1989) |
| | Tom Griscom | April 2, 1987 | July 1, 1988 | 1 year, 90 days | | Ronald Reagan (1981–1989) |
| | Mari Maseng Will | July 1, 1988 | January 20, 1989 | 203 days | | Ronald Reagan (1981–1989) |
| | David Demarest | January 20, 1989 | August 23, 1992 | 3 years, 216 days | | George H. W. Bush (1989–1993) |
| | Margaret Tutwiler | August 23, 1992 | January 20, 1993 | 150 days | | George H. W. Bush (1989–1993) |
| | George Stephanopoulos | January 20, 1993 | June 7, 1993 | 138 days | | Bill Clinton (1993–2001) |
| | Mark Gearan | June 7, 1993 | August 14, 1995 | 2 years, 68 days | | Bill Clinton (1993–2001) |
| | Don Baer | August 14, 1995 | July 31, 1997 | 1 year, 351 days | | Bill Clinton (1993–2001) |
| | Ann Lewis | July 31, 1997 | March 10, 1999 | 1 year, 222 days | | Bill Clinton (1993–2001) |
| | Loretta Ucelli | March 10, 1999 | January 20, 2001 | 1 year, 316 days | | Bill Clinton (1993–2001) |
| | Karen Hughes | January 20, 2001 | October 2, 2001 | 255 days | | George W. Bush (2001–2009) |
| | Dan Bartlett | October 2, 2001 | January 5, 2005 | 3 years, 95 days | | George W. Bush (2001–2009) |
| | Nicolle Wallace | January 5, 2005 | July 24, 2006 | 1 year, 200 days | | George W. Bush (2001–2009) |
| | Kevin Sullivan | July 24, 2006 | January 20, 2009 | 2 years, 180 days | | George W. Bush (2001–2009) |
| | Ellen Moran | January 20, 2009 | April 21, 2009 | 91 days | | Barack Obama (2009–2017) |
| | Anita Dunn | April 21, 2009 | November 30, 2009 | 223 days | | Barack Obama (2009–2017) |
| | Dan Pfeiffer | November 30, 2009 | January 25, 2013 | 3 years, 56 days | | Barack Obama (2009–2017) |
| | Jen Palmieri | January 25, 2013 | April 1, 2015 | 2 years, 66 days | | Barack Obama (2009–2017) |
| | Jen Psaki | April 1, 2015 | January 20, 2017 | 1 year, 294 days | | Barack Obama (2009–2017) |
| | Sean Spicer | January 20, 2017 | March 6, 2017 | 45 days | | Donald Trump (2017–2021) |
| | Michael Dubke | March 6, 2017 | June 2, 2017 | 88 days | | Donald Trump (2017–2021) |
| | Sean Spicer | June 2, 2017 | July 21, 2017 | 49 days | | Donald Trump (2017–2021) |
| | Anthony Scaramucci | July 21, 2017 | July 31, 2017 | 10 days | | Donald Trump (2017–2021) |
| | Hope Hicks | August 16, 2017 | September 12, 2017 | 225 days | | Donald Trump (2017–2021) |
| | Hope Hicks | September 12, 2017 | March 29, 2018 | 225 days | | Donald Trump (2017–2021) |
| | Bill Shine | July 5, 2018 | March 8, 2019 | 246 days | | Donald Trump (2017–2021) |
| | Stephanie Grisham | July 1, 2019 | April 7, 2020 | 281 days | | Donald Trump (2017–2021) |
| | Kate Bedingfield | January 20, 2021 | March 1, 2023 | 2 years, 40 days | | Joe Biden (2021–2025) |
| | Ben LaBolt | March 1, 2023 | January 20, 2025 | 1 year, 325 days | | Joe Biden (2021–2025) |
| | Steven Cheung | January 20, 2025 | Incumbent | 1 year, 302 days | | Donald Trump (2025–present) |
