= Karen Hughes =

American diplomat (born 1956)

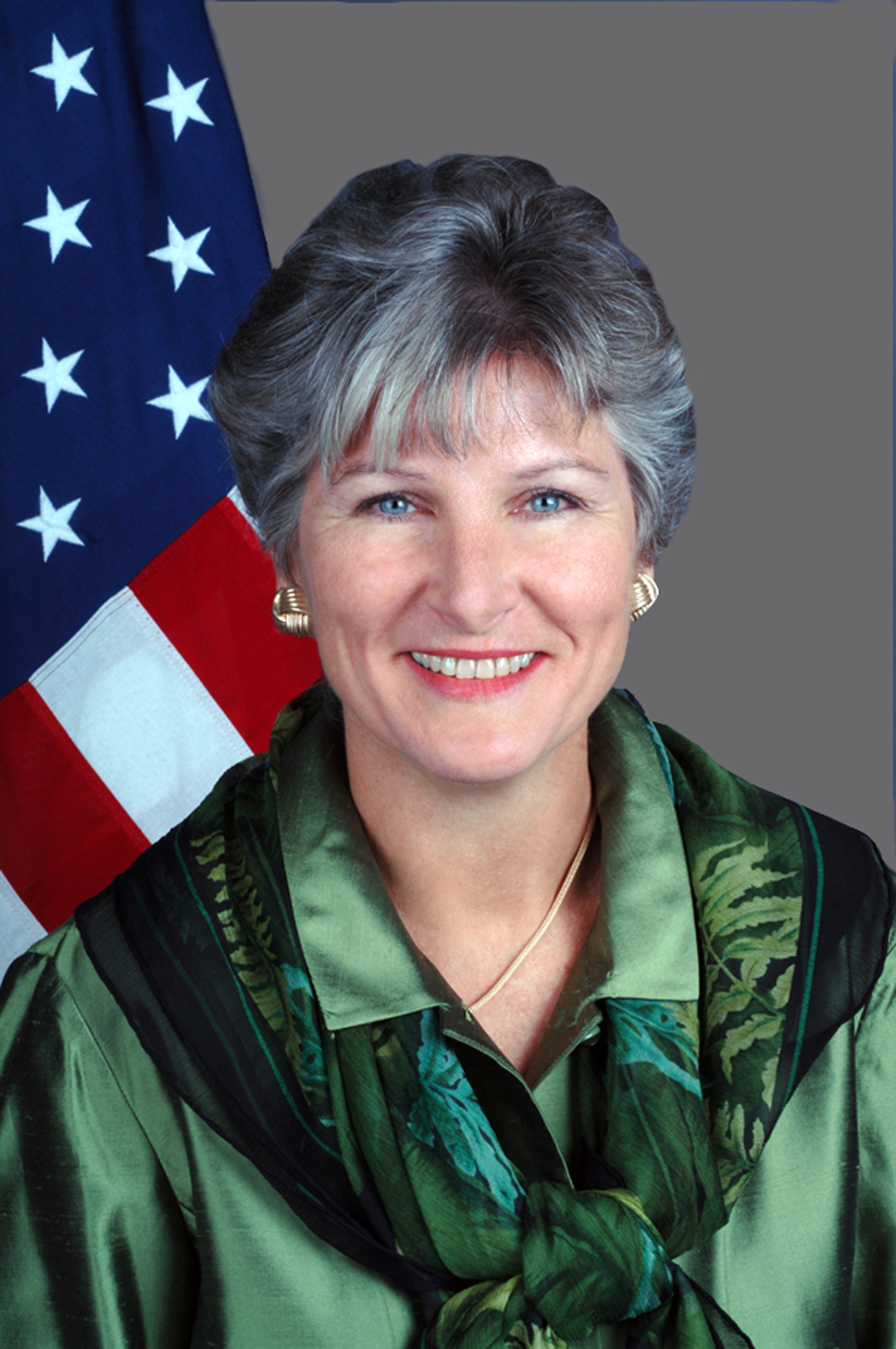
- Official portrait, 2005

4th Under Secretary of State for Public Diplomacy and Public Affairs
- In office July 29, 2005 – December 14, 2007
- President: George W. Bush
- Preceded by: Margaret D. Tutwiler
- Succeeded by: James K. Glassman

Counselor to the President
- In office January 20, 2001 – July 8, 2002
- President: George W. Bush
- Preceded by: Ann Lewis
- Succeeded by: Dan Bartlett

White House Communications Director
- In office January 20, 2001 – October 2, 2001
- President: George W. Bush
- Preceded by: Loretta Ucelli
- Succeeded by: Dan Bartlett

Personal details
- Born: Karen Parfitt; December 27, 1956 (age 69) Paris, France
- Party: Republican
- Education: Southern Methodist University (BA)

Karen Parfitt Hughes (born December 27, 1956) is an American public affairs executive and communications strategist who served as the Under Secretary of State for Public Diplomacy and Public Affairs in the U.S. Department of State and as a counselor to President George W. Bush.

== Early life ==
Born in Paris, France, Hughes is the daughter of American parents Patricia Rose (Scully) and Harold Parfitt, the last U.S. Governor of the Panama Canal Zone. After graduating from W. T. White High School in Dallas, Texas, Hughes earned a bachelor's degree at Southern Methodist University in 1977 where she was a member of Alpha Delta Pi sorority. She is of partial Irish and English descent.

== Early career ==
Hughes worked as a television news reporter from 1977 to 1984. As a reporter, Hughes followed the 1980 presidential campaign. In 1984, she went to work as the Texas press coordinator for the Reagan-Bush campaign in the 1984 United States presidential election. In 1992, she became Executive Director of the Republican Party of Texas. In 1994, Hughes began working with George W. Bush, as a communications strategist in his campaign for Texas governor. From 1995 to 1999, she served in his gubernatorial administration as Director of Communications.

== George W. Bush Administration ==
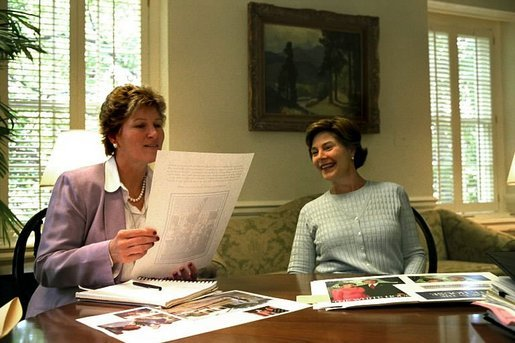
Karen Hughes with First Lady Laura Bush, June 28, 2002

When Bush ran for President in 2000, Hughes served as his Communications Director. She has been credited with developing and shaping his image as a "compassionate conservative." She would later work as a counselor to the president from 2001 to 2002, involved in major domestic and foreign policy issues. She led the communications effort in the first year of the war against terror, and managed the White House Offices of Communications, Media Affairs, Speechwriting and Press Secretary.

Hughes left the Bush administration in July 2002 to return to Texas, but remained in daily contact with the Bush reelection campaign by telephone and e-mail, and spoke personally with Bush several times a week. In August 2004, Hughes returned to full-time service with the Bush campaign, setting up office on Air Force One, from where she planned the 2004 Republican National Convention and the late stages of the 2004 election. She has been described by The Dallas Morning News as "the most powerful woman ever to serve in the White House", and by ABC News as Bush's "most essential advisor."

== Ten Minutes from Normal ==
In March 2004, Hughes published Ten Minutes from Normal, which includes an account of her decision to leave the White House. While promoting her book, she appeared on CNN on April 25, 2004 – the same day as the March for Women's Lives – and said "I think after September 11th the American people are valuing life more and realizing that we need policies to value the dignity and worth of every life. And President Bush has worked to say, let's be reasonable, let's work to value life, let's try to reduce the number of abortions, let's increase adoptions. And I think those are the kind of policies that the American people can support, particularly at a time when we're facing an enemy, and really the fundamental difference between us and the terror network we fight is that we value every life. It's the founding conviction of our country, that we're endowed by our creator with certain unalienable rights, the right to life and liberty and the pursuit of happiness."

== State Department ==
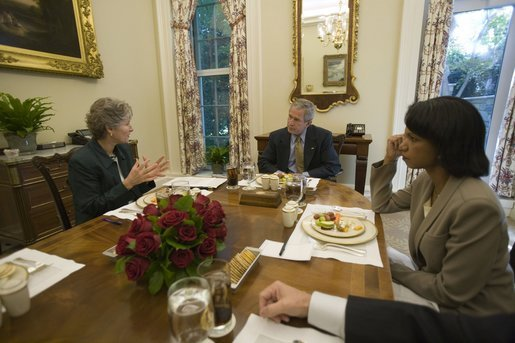
Karen Hughes (L) at White House luncheon with President George Bush (C) and United States National Security Advisor and United States Secretary of State Condoleezza Rice (R)

On March 14, 2005, Bush announced his intention to nominate Hughes for the undersecretary of state for public diplomacy with the rank of ambassador — a job focused on changing foreigners' perceptions about America. The Senate confirmed her nomination in July 2005. In her new capacity, Hughes spoke of improving the world's perception of the United States via creation of a "rapid-response unit" and a plan to "forward-deploy regional SWAT teams". During a town hall meeting on September 8, 2005, a State Department employee complained that "recently, we've had tremendous amount of difficulty in some cases getting clearance for our ambassadors to speak." Hughes replied, "If they make statements based on something I sent them, they're not going to be called on the carpet."

At the end of her tenure in the State Department, Hughes said that one of her greatest accomplishments had been "transforming public diplomacy and making it a national security priority central to everything we do in government". Hughes was the keynote speaker at the October 22, 2007, Public Relations Society of America's International Conference and discussed, "Waging Peace – The New Paradigm for Public Diplomacy."

== 2005 tour of the Middle East ==
Starting with a September 26, 2005, stop in Egypt, Hughes went on a "listening tour" of the Middle East to speak with leaders and people from the region. This was a response to growing fears in America about rampant anti-Americanism in the Middle East. Hughes was the third person chosen for this task by President Bush, following unsuccessful attempts by Charlotte Beers and Margaret Tutwiler. For her tour, Hughes asked two Citizen Ambassadors to accompany her: a Georgetown PhD student, Tina Kareema Dauod, and William O'Brien, a retired high school geography teacher.

On her September 27 stop in Jeddah, Saudi Arabia, during a Q&A with students in which a student shared her appreciation of women being allowed to drive in the United States, Karen Hughes acknowledged that every country has to chart its own course and choose what's right for its own citizens, but also shared in the women's sentiment about the United States. Another woman shared: "The general image of the Arab woman is that she isn't happy [...] Well, we're all pretty happy."

In a press conference in Jakarta, Indonesia, Hughes incorrectly stated that Saddam Hussein "had murdered hundreds of thousands of his own people using poison gas." Conventional sources attest that Saddam did order the deaths of several hundred thousand Iraqis during the al-Anfal Campaign and other violent suppressions, but casualties from his infamous gas attack on Halabja numbered in the thousands.

== Breast cancer research advocacy ==
Hughes met business representatives from the United Arab Emirates (UAE) to create the U.S.-U.A.E. Partnership for Breast Cancer Awareness and Research. It aims to develop breast cancer awareness campaigns and expand research in the Middle East by linking U.S. medical experts, fundraisers, health research activists, and businesses with their U.A.E. counterparts.

== Post White House ==
In late October 2007, Hughes made it known that she would be resigning from her position in the Bush White House. Secretary of State Condoleezza Rice was quoted as saying she accepted the resignation "with a great deal of sadness but also a great deal of happiness for what she has achieved."

Hughes served as Worldwide Vice Chair for Burson-Marsteller, a public relations company from 2008 to 2022. She also served on the Parsley Energy Board of Directors from 2017 to 2021.

== Footnotes ==
1. Rootsweb.com. Record on Karen (Parfitt) Hughes .
2. Lauerman, Kerry (September 13, 2003). "You burn out fast when you demagogue". Salon. Archived from the original on May 12, 2009.
3. Interview of Karen Hughes. Transcript of Late Edition with Wolf Blitzer, CNN.com, Aired April 5, 2004.
4. Dana Milbank. Hughes is Varnishing the Nation's Tarnish, The Washington Post, September 9, 2005.
5. Transcript of Interview of Bob Garfield. Scuttle Diplomacy, On the Media, June 1, 2007.
6. U.S. Department of State Transcript. Briefing En Route Ankara, Turkey. September 26, 2005
7. Steven R. Weisman. Saudi Women Have Message for U.S. Envoy, New York Times, September 28, 2005.
8. Alan Sipress. Hughes Misreports Iraqi History, Washington Post, October 22, 2005.
9. Elizabeth Kelleher. State's Hughes Joins Dubai Businesswomen To Fight Breast Cancer, U.S. Department of State, November 1, 2006.
10. USME Partnership for Breast Cancer Awareness and Research. US Middle East Partnership Website.

Political offices
Preceded by Loretta Ucelli	White House Director of Communications; 2001	Succeeded by Dan Bartlett
Preceded by Ann Lewis	Counselor to the President; 2001–2002	Succeeded by Dan Bartlett
Preceded by Margaret Tutwiler	Undersecretary of State for Public Diplomacy and Public Affairs; 2005–2007	Succeeded by James Glassman
