= Gergen =

Gergen is the surname of several persons and a village:

- David Gergen (1942–2025), American political consultant
- John Jay Gergen, American mathematician
- Kenneth J. Gergen (born 1935), American psychologist and professor
- Mary Gergen, American social psychologist
- Gergen, Araç, a village in Araç District, Kastamonu province, Turkey
