= Draft Bloomberg movement =

Political draft movement in the US

The Draft Bloomberg movement was a political draft movement in the United States that launched in 2007 as an effort to convince New York City Mayor Michael Bloomberg to run for President of the United States as an independent candidate in the 2008 election. The movement ended for that election cycle on February 28, 2008, when Bloomberg formally announced that he would not run for president.

The movement relaunched in late 2010 as an effort to persuade Bloomberg to make a presidential bid and/or lead in the formation of a viable third party in 2012. Eight years later, he eventually entered the 2020 Democratic Party presidential primaries and lost, after winning only the territory of American Samoa, while missing the 15% threshold for proportional delegates in several states.

== Support from Independent Greens of Virginia ==
In January 2008, the Independent Greens of Virginia launched the first state petition drive in the nation to put Michael Bloomberg on the ballot for president. The party collected and submitted more than the minimum number of required petition signatures with Bloomberg's name to the Virginia State Board of Elections, prior to the Board's deadline, to put the party on the ballot for president in Virginia. Despite these efforts, Bloomberg did not appear on the Virginia ballot in the 2008 election as a presidential candidate because, one day prior to the State's deadline for ballot submissions, he requested that the party remove his name.

== Unity08 splinter group ==
There had been speculation of drafting Bloomberg to run as a presidential candidate on the Unity08 ticket. On January 10, 2008, the organization released a statement announcing that two of its co-founders, Doug Bailey and Gerald Rafshoon, were leaving Unity08 and launching a national draft movement to entice Bloomberg to run as an independent candidate.

== Support for the movement in 2008 ==
Support for the movement came primarily from independent voters unhappy with the choices the two major parties were offering. Scott Adams, creator of the comic strip Dilbert, and entrepreneur Mark Cuban acknowledged the movement on their respective blogs and made favorable comments regarding a potential Bloomberg presidential campaign. Political consultants Doug Bailey and Gerald Rafshoon quit the Unity08 movement to work to draft Bloomberg.

== Relaunch for 2012 election campaign ==
In October 2010, The Committee to Draft Michael Bloomberg announced it was relaunching the movement in hopes of persuading Bloomberg to lead in bringing together independents, members of the Independence Party of America and Greens to form a viable third party. The Draft Bloomberg Committee choose this approach as polls in October 2010 showed 58% of Americans want a third major party, and Bloomberg has stated that he does not intend to seek the presidency in 2012.

== See also ==
- Michael Bloomberg 2020 presidential campaign
- Draft Condi movement
- Draft Ron Paul movement
