= Roger Craver =

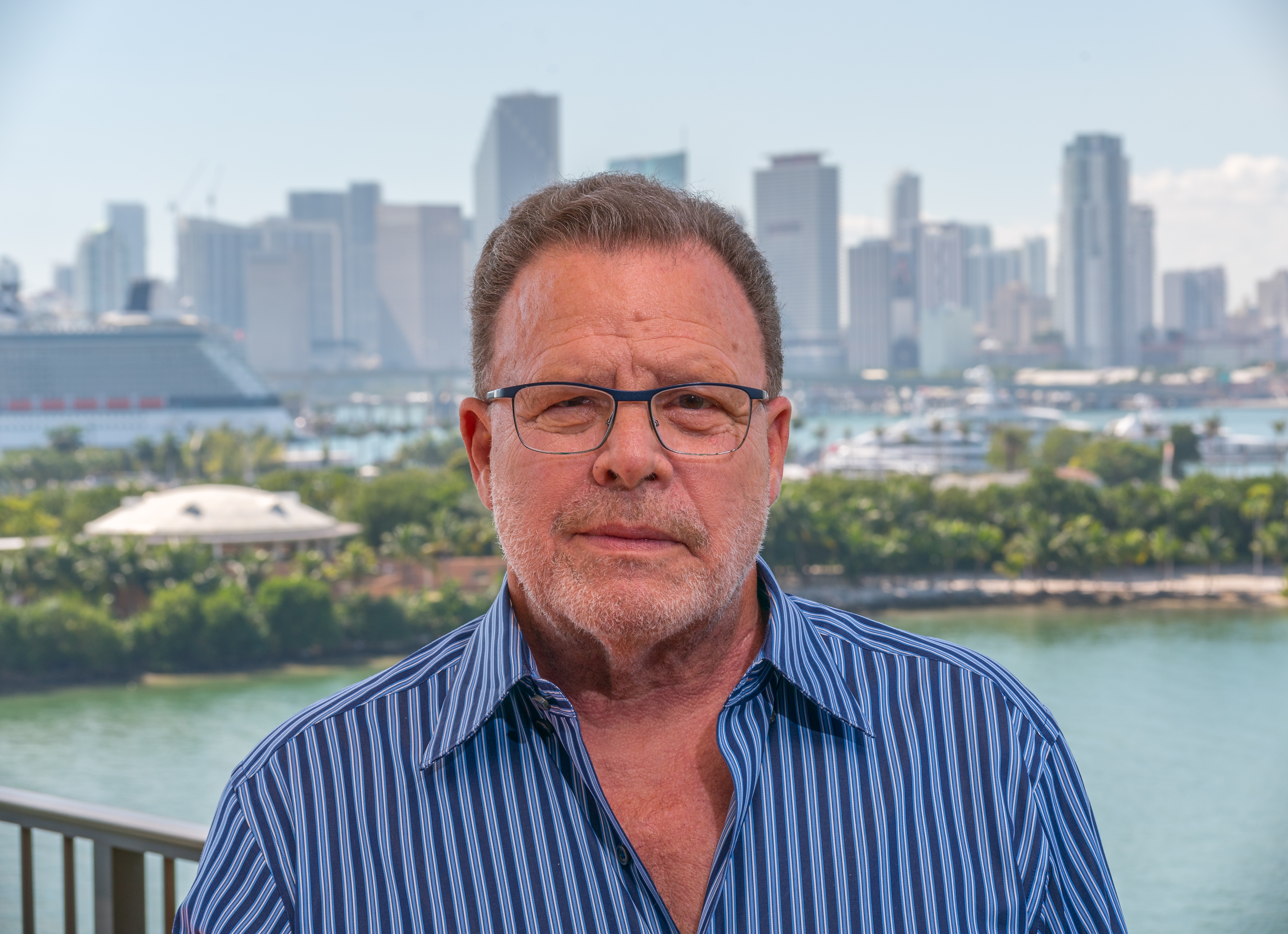
- Born: Roger Moore Craver
- Education: Dickinson College
- Occupations: Fundraiser and Author

Roger Moore Craver is an American fundraiser and campaigner for progressive causes. A pioneer of liberal political and movement direct mail and co-founder of The Hotline, a bipartisan online briefing on American politics, Craver is currently Editor of TheAgitator.net.

== Background ==
Craver received his bachelor's degree from Dickinson College.

== Career ==
Along with his conservative counterpart, Richard Viguerie, Craver was among the first to apply direct mail methodology to movement and political fundraising. He has said that the frustration and alienation that Americans felt during the 1960s developed a social environment that encouraged the success of the fundraising method. Later scholars would call Craver an early pioneer for Democratic and progressive direct mail efforts.

In 1969 Craver joined John W. Gardner in creating Common Cause. He familiarized himself with the techniques of veteran commercial direct mail marketer Lester Wunderman and figured out how to apply them to marketing nonprofit causes. The success of Common Cause -- $2 million and a donor list of 100,000 in the first six months—proved to be a catalyst for the founding and growth of similar citizen action organizations.

In 1972, Craver left Common Cause to found Craver, Mathews, Smith & Company (CMS), the consulting firm that helped launch the National Organization for Women (NOW), The National Abortion Rights Action League (NARAL) The National Council to Control Handguns (now the Brady Campaign) and grow the ACLU, Planned Parenthood, Sierra Club, Amnesty International, Greenpeace, The Southern Poverty Law Center, and help dozens more nonprofits like Habitat for Humanity and Heifer International gain traction through direct mail fundraising.

The post-Watergate campaign finance reforms limiting the amount of money individuals could contribute to political campaigns boosted the importance of mass direct mail with its smaller individual gifts and found Craver and Tom Mathews, his business partner, actively engaged in fundraising for the Democratic Party and liberal candidates.

By the late 1970s, his firm raised significant amounts for Democratic Senate candidates, including Frank Church (Idaho), George McGovern (South Dakota), Birch Bayh (Indiana), and John Culver (Iowa). They repeated the process from the mid-70s through 1980 for the presidential campaigns of Morris Udall, Edward Kennedy, and John Anderson.

Through most of 1980s and early 1990s Craver and his firm worked on programs for the Democratic National Committee (DNC), the Democratic Senatorial Campaign Committee (DSCC), and the Democratic Congressional Campaign Committee (DCCC). But they resigned after working with the Democratic National Committee for six years and building its donor base from 60,000 to 750,000. Craver discovered that DNC chairman Charles Manatt and former vice president Walter Mondale were lobbyists for the Alyeska Pipeline Company, and that this constituted a conflict of interest with a CMS client, the Sierra Club.

After working with the Democratic Congressional Campaign Committee for ten years, CMS resigned because its client Common Cause had filed a conflict of interest complaint against Speaker of the House Jim Wright, who was ex-officio chair of the DCCC. In 1991, after twelve years, CMS resigned from the Democratic Senatorial Campaign Committee over the Democrats’ failure to respond quickly and forcefully to the sexual abuse allegations by Anita Hill against Justice Clarence Thomas during his Supreme Court nomination hearings. Craver told The New York Times, “Women constitute a substantial portion of the donors to the D.S.C.C. For years, they have been reaching deep into their pockets to help protect the Democratic majority in the Senate because they truly believed only a Democratic Senate could protect them from an increasingly conservative judiciary and an outwardly hostile executive branch. That faith was shattered by the way the Democratically controlled Senate handled the entire Thomas nomination."

In 2006 Craver returned to politics to help launch a Unity08 a political reform movement aimed at offering voters the opportunity to directly engage in politics online, and through a secure vote nominate an alternative bipartisan ticket to the Democratic and Republican Parties’ presidential tickets for the 2008 Presidential election. The Unity08 ticket was to consist of two candidates from the two parties. The bipartisan team was to propose a bipartisan cabinet in an effort to end paralysis in government. The organization suspended operations in early 2008 over disputes with the Federal Election Commission, lack of adequate funding and the resignation of two of its top leaders.

In September 1987, Craver partnered with Doug Bailey, a Republican consultant, to found The Hotline.

== Publications ==
Craver is Editor of the fundraising and communications blog and website The Agitator, which for 11 years has provided daily insight into fundraising trends.

In 2014, Emerson & Church published Craver's book Retention Fundraising: the new art and science of keeping your donors for life in which he explores why donors quit an organization, what can be done to retain donors, and identifies the key drivers that deepen a donor's commitment.

In 2010, John Wiley & Sons published Internet Management for Nonprofits: Strategies, Tools and Trade Secrets to which Craver contributed the chapter “Insight Tools for Surviving and Thriving” and, served as a contributing author in the John Wiley & Sons 1st edition of the book Achieving Excellence in Fundraising.

== Recognition ==
- 2017: Growing Philanthropy Award presented by the Hartsook Institutes for Fundraising
- 2011: The American Association of Political Consultants Hall of Fame
- 2002: Direct Marketing Association Max Hart Nonprofit Achievement Award
