= Kwame Heshimu =

Musical artist (born 1954)

Kwame
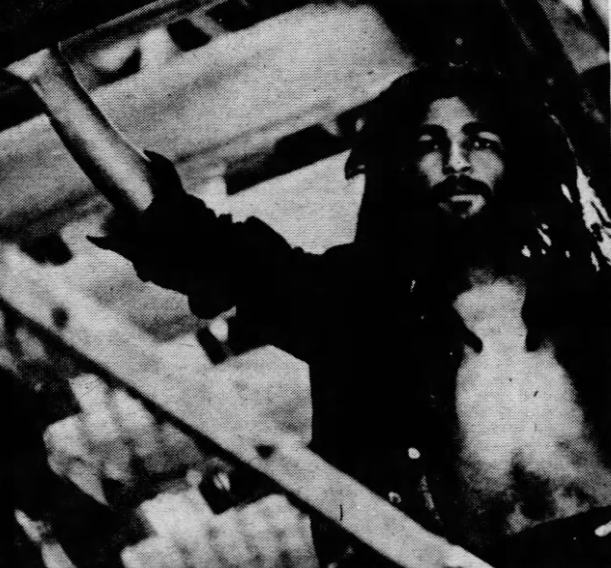

Background information
- Also known as: Kwame, Kiname Heshimu, Synthesis Inc.
- Born: Kwame Heshimu; January 17, 1954 (age 72); Saint Ann's Bay, Saint Ann Parish, Colony of Jamaica
- Genres: Reggae
- Occupations: musician, songwriter, producer, adjunct instructor
- Years active: 1970–present
- Labels: Polydor, Chanti Music
- Formerly of: Full Hand Band

Kwame Heshimu (born January 17, 1954) is a Jamaican-American musician, songwriter, and adjunct instructor at the Pratt Institute's School of Liberal Arts & Sciences. He formed the band Full Hand in 1975 and released a solo album, Follow I, in 1980, which received high praise.

== Early life ==
Kwame Heshimu was born on January 17, 1954, in Saint Ann Parish, Jamaica to a Cuban father and a Jamaican Maroon mother. At the age of sixteen, he became musical director of "Sing Out Jamaica", a group that toured in several Caribbean island nations and enjoyed mild success. He briefly moved to New York City for a year before returning to Jamaica in order to work with Augustus Pablo and Linval Thompson on several songs at the Harry J Studio in Kingston. In 1974, once production on each record had finished, Heshimu began studying at the Hartford Conservatory of Music in Hartford, Connecticut. He also holds a Bachelor of Arts in English (specialization in writing) from New York University.

== Career ==
=== Full Hand Band ===
Upon his return to New York in 1976, Heshimu formed the Full Hand Band alongside fellow Jamaican Winston Gardner and six Americans. Proctor Lippincott of The New York Times wrote, "Mr. Heshinu's tenor voice can be caressing and seductive, like Smokey Robinson's, more often carries a raspy, staccato urgency reminiscent of the vocal style of Mr. Marley, who has been a big influence". For the first few years of its existence, the band played primarily in Long Island clubs and grew a cult following. Al Anderson of The Wailers joined the band in 1977 and Heshimu would leave the following year to found a record label, Chanti Music.

=== Solo career ===
After leaving Full Hand in order to "reassess his direction", Heshimu founded Chanti Music in 1978. It was while with the label that he wrote, produced, and arranged three singles, two being sung by himself and another sung by Nadine Hart. Polydor Records signed Heshimu in 1980, making him their first reggae artist. Around the same time, he was a songwriter on The Bar-Kays' album, As One.

The following November Heshimu released his debut album, Follow I, produced by Lee Jaffe and Karl Pitterson. He announced his intent to tour drummer Balford Breadwood, guitarist Joe Ortiz and ex-Full Hand bassist Winston Gardner. The record was met with generally favorable reviews.

=== Adjunct instructor ===
As of 2025, Heshimu is the adjunct instructor of Humanities and Media Studies and a tutor at the Pratt Institute's School of Liberal Arts & Sciences in Brooklyn.

== Personal life ==
Heshimu's daughter, Kyoko Heshiimu, is a poet and artist based in New York City. He voiced his support of Michael Bloomberg's potential presidential candidacy in 2006 in an interview with Staten Island Advance.

Heshimu is not religious, although he has acknowledged Rastafari culture as a major inspiration for his music.
