= Diageo/Hotline Poll =

American political public opinion poll

The Diageo/Hotline Poll is an American public opinion poll that surveys and tracks public opinion surrounding the important political and economic issues of the day. Conducted by FD, a business and financial communications consultancy, the poll is a result of a partnership between corporate sponsor Diageo, a spirits, beer and wine company, and media partner The Hotline, published by National Journal. The poll has been conducted monthly since January 2005, via telephone among a random national sample of 800 or more registered voters aged eighteen and older.

== The Diageo/Hotline Daily Tracker Poll ==
The Diageo/Hotline Daily Tracker Poll is a daily tracking poll that surveyed important issues surrounding the 2008 general election. The poll started fielding on September 2, 2008, and was conducted until Election Day, November 4, 2008. The last poll results on November 3 found Obama-Biden leading McCain-Palin by 5 points, coming within one point of the actual election results (in which Obama-Biden led McCain-Palin by 6 points).
