= Frank Ursomarso =

American political strategist

White House Communications Director
- In office February 23, 1981 – June 17, 1981; Acting: February 23, 1981 – March 27, 1981
- President: Ronald Reagan
- Preceded by: Gerald Rafshoon (1978)
- Succeeded by: David Gergen

Personal details
- Born: September 19, 1942 (age 83) Philadelphia, Pennsylvania, U.S.
- Party: Republican
- Education: Gettysburg College (BA); University of California, Los Angeles (JD)

Frank Ursomarso (born September 19, 1942) is an American political strategist who served as White House Communications Director in 1981.

Political offices
Vacant Title last held by Gerald Rafshoon	White House Director of Communications; 1981	Succeeded by David Gergen
