= David Gergen =

American political consultant and presidential advisor (1942–2025)

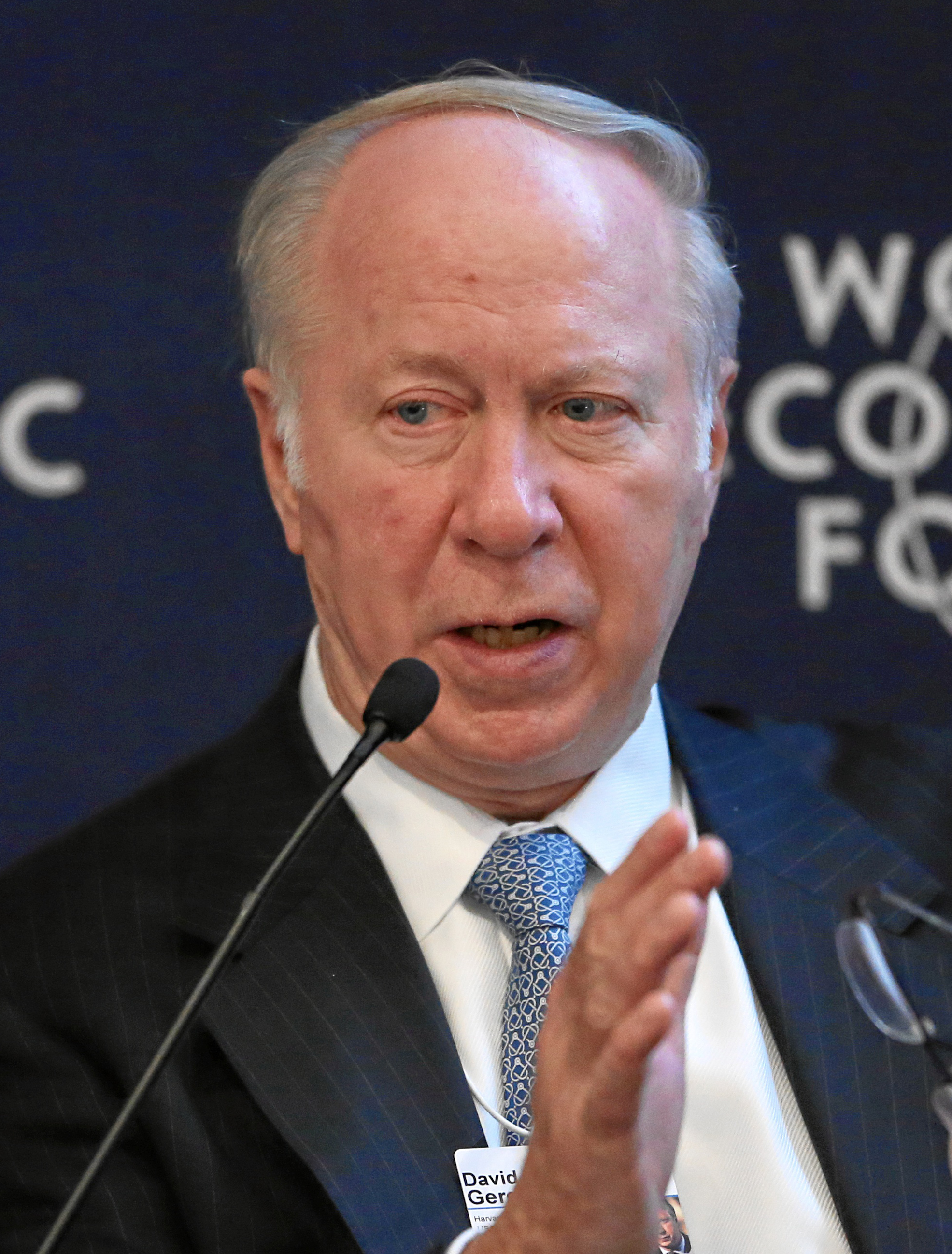
- Gergen at the 2013 World Economic Forum

Counselor to the President
- In office May 29, 1993 – June 28, 1994
- President: Bill Clinton
- Preceded by: Clayton Yeutter
- Succeeded by: Mack McLarty

White House Communications Director
- In office June 17, 1981 – January 15, 1984
- President: Ronald Reagan
- Preceded by: Frank Ursomarso
- Succeeded by: Michael A. McManus Jr.
- In office July 4, 1976 – January 20, 1977
- President: Gerald Ford
- Preceded by: Margita White
- Succeeded by: Gerald Rafshoon (1978)

White House Staff Secretary
- In office January 20, 1981 – June 17, 1981
- President: Ronald Reagan
- Preceded by: Richard Hutcheson
- Succeeded by: Richard Darman

White House Director of Speechwriting
- In office February 6, 1973 – August 9, 1974
- President: Richard Nixon
- Preceded by: Ray Price
- Succeeded by: Robert Hartmann

Personal details
- Born: David Richmond Gergen; May 9, 1942 Durham, North Carolina, U.S.
- Died: July 10, 2025 (aged 83) Lexington, Massachusetts, U.S.
- Party: Republican (before 2017); Independent (2017–present)
- Spouse: Anne Gergen (m. 1967)
- Relations: Kenneth J. Gergen (brother)
- Children: 2
- Parent: John Jay Gergen (father)
- Education: Yale University (BA); Harvard University (LLB)
- Website: Official website

Military service
- Allegiance: United States
- Branch/service: United States Navy

David Richmond Gergen (May 9, 1942 – July 10, 2025) was an American political commentator and longtime presidential adviser who served during the administrations of Richard Nixon, Gerald Ford, Ronald Reagan, and Bill Clinton. He was later a senior political analyst for CNN and a professor of public service and the founding director of the Center for Public Leadership at the Harvard Kennedy School. Gergen was also the former editor at large of U.S. News & World Report and a contributor to CNN and Parade Magazine. He was twice a member of election coverage teams that won Peabody awards: in 1988 with MacNeil–Lehrer (now PBS News Hour), and in 2008 with CNN.

Gergen joined the Nixon White House in 1971, as a staff assistant on the speech-writing team, becoming director of speechwriting two years later. He served as director of communications for both Ford and Reagan, and as a senior adviser to Clinton and Secretary of State Warren Christopher. He graduated with honors from Yale University and Harvard Law School, and was awarded 27 honorary degrees.

== Early life ==
David Gergen was born on May 9, 1942, in Durham, North Carolina. His parents were John Jay Gergen, the chairman of the mathematics department at Duke University from 1937 to 1966, and Aubigne Munger (née Lermond). He was the youngest of four children. One of his brothers, Kenneth J. Gergen, is a psychologist and professor emeritus at Swarthmore College in Swarthmore, Pennsylvania.

== Education ==
Gergen was educated at Durham High School, a former public high school in his hometown of Durham where he edited the school newspaper, Hi-Rocket. After high school graduation, he went to Yale University, from which he earned his B.A. degree in American studies in 1963, and was a member of the Manuscript Society. At Yale, he was managing editor of the Yale Daily News, whose staff at the time included Joe Lieberman, Stephen Bingham, Robert G. Kaiser, and Paul Steiger. Gergen received his LL.B. degree from Harvard Law School in 1967 and married Anne Elizabeth Gergen, a native of London, England, the same year.

== Life and career ==
For three summers, Gergen was an intern in the office of North Carolina Governor Terry Sanford, where he became deeply involved in civil rights efforts. Gergen called this work his "most satisfying experience in public service." He served in the U.S. Navy for three-and-a-half years and was stationed on a ship home-ported in Japan. Gergen wrote in his book of his time as a damage control officer on a repair ship, USS Ajax: "Learning to control damage, it turned out, was the best possible preparation for my coming years in the White House".

=== Political activity ===
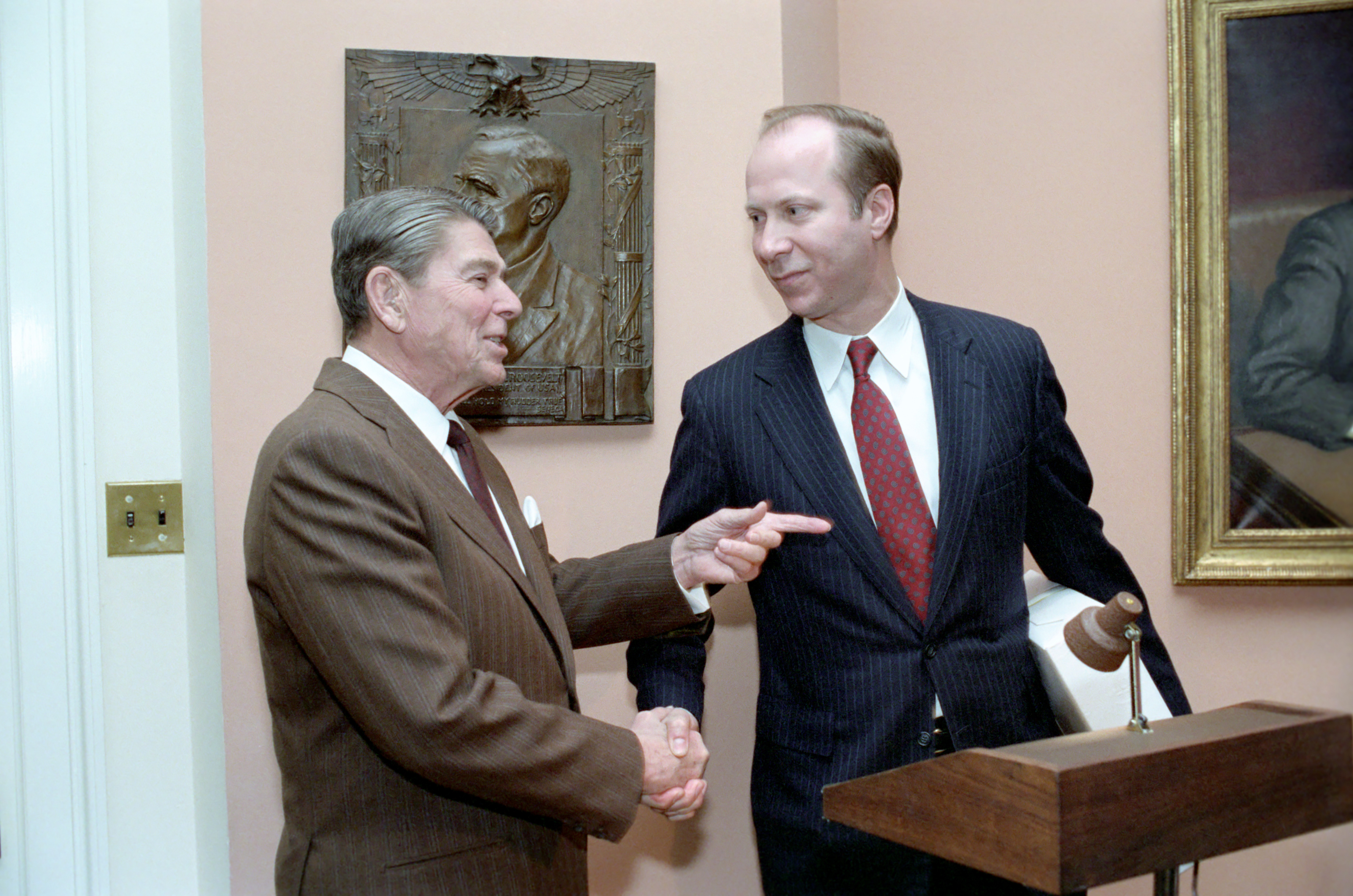
Gergen with President Ronald Reagan in 1984

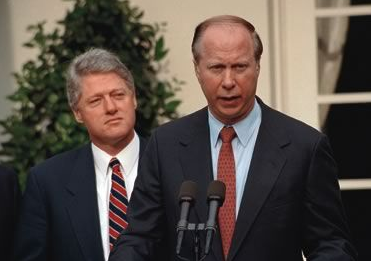
Gergen with President Bill Clinton, May 1993

Gergen began his political career in 1971 when he went to work for Richard Nixon as a staff assistant in the office of speechwriters headed by Ray Price—a group which included Pat Buchanan, Ben Stein, and William Safire. In 1973, became the director.

In 1974, Gergen took a brief hiatus from the White House to write speeches for Treasury Secretary William E. Simon. Gergen wrote in his book, "For me it was a great trade—the Treasury team taught me all about free markets and fiscal discipline." Gergen returned to the White House in 1975 as director of communications for President Gerald Ford. In 1980, Gergen was an adviser to the George H. W. Bush presidential campaign and went on to join the Reagan White House in 1981. Beginning as a staff director, he eventually became director of communications. In 1993, Gergen returned to the White House, serving as counselor to President Bill Clinton and Secretary of State Warren Christopher.

=== Journalism ===
Gergen was a senior political analyst for CNN, regularly appearing on Anderson Cooper 360, Erin Burnett OutFront, and other shows.

After his years in public service, Gergen worked as a political journalist, commentator, and editor. After leaving the White House in 1977, he worked as a freelance writer and, in 1978, as the first managing editor of Public Opinion, a magazine published by the American Enterprise Institute. From 1985 to 1986, he worked as an editor at U.S. News & World Report, where he became editor at large after his service in the Clinton administration. There, he worked with publisher Mort Zuckerman to achieve record gains in circulation and advertising.

Gergen's career in television began in 1985, when he joined the MacNeil/Lehrer NewsHour for Friday night discussions of politics, where he remained a regular commentator for five years. In addition to CNN, he was a frequent guest on NPR and CBS’ Face the Nation. He wrote for Parade Magazine and was published in an array of other publications including The New York Times and Newsweek. Twice he was a member of election coverage teams which won Peabody awards in 1988 with MacNeil/Lehrer Newshour and in 2008 with CNN.

=== Academia ===
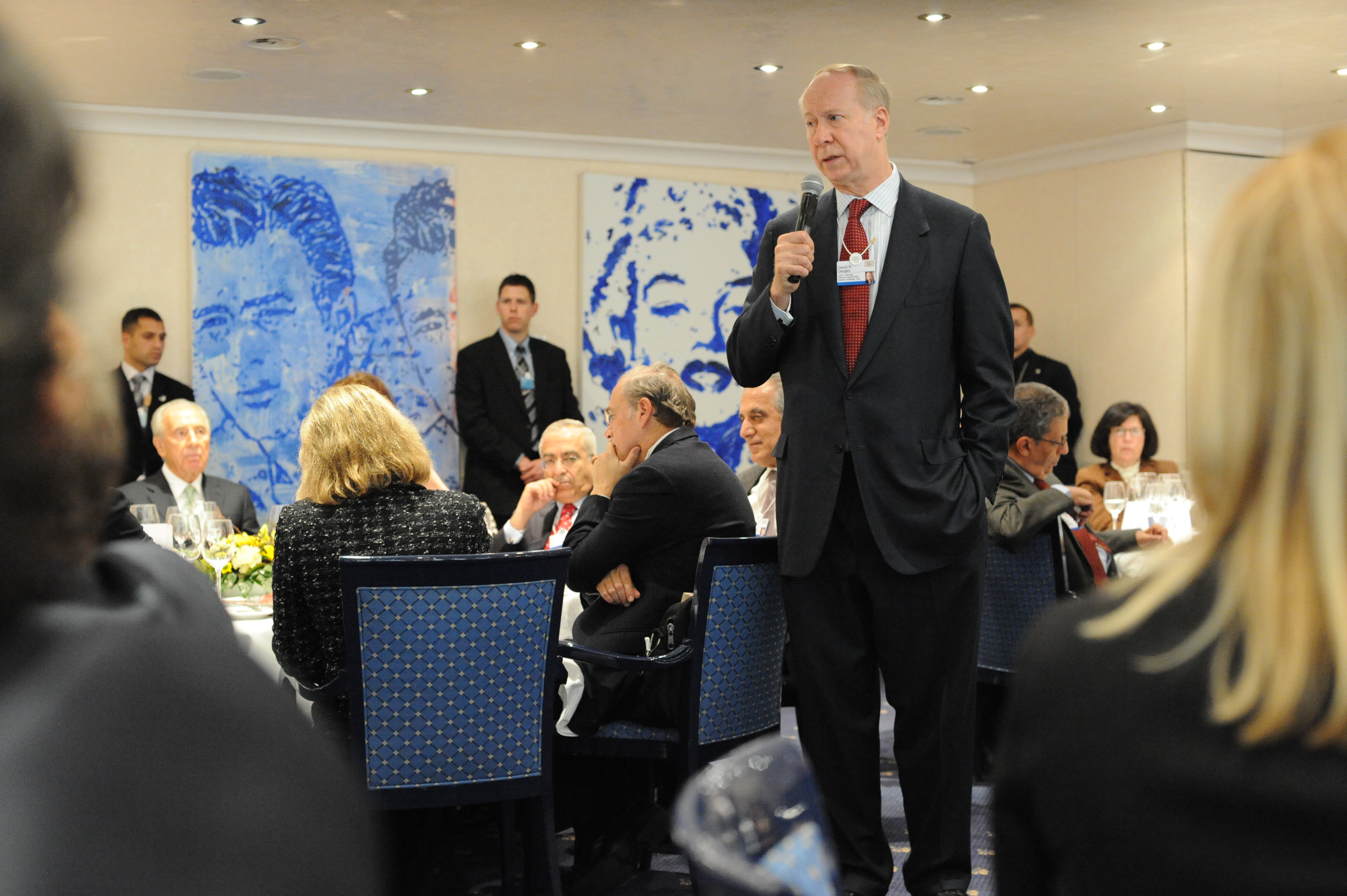
Gergen at the 2008 World Economic Forum

Gergen taught at Duke University from 1995 to 1999 and then joined the Harvard University faculty in 1999. He was also a professor of public service at the Harvard Kennedy School, where he taught courses on leadership, public service, and U.S. politics. During election years, he co-taught a course called Contemporary Issues in American Elections with Elaine Kamarck. In January 2014 he taught a Harvard short-term course in New York City titled "Leadership for a Livable City."

At Harvard Kennedy School, he served as the co-director of the Kennedy School Center for Public Leadership, which seeks to enhance leadership teaching and research. The Center helps to provide scholarships to 100 fellows a year, preparing them to serve as leaders for the common good.

Gergen served as the inaugural Isabella Cannon Distinguished Visiting Professor of Leadership at Elon University and was a fellow at Harvard University's Institute of Politics in 1984.

=== Books ===
Gergen is the author of the New York Times bestseller book Eyewitness to Power: The Essence of Leadership, Nixon to Clinton, published in 2000. The book recounts his time in the Nixon, Ford, Reagan, and Clinton administrations. Gergen argued that, as the 21st century began, the success of the United States as a country would depend heavily upon the success of a new generation in power. Drawing upon his many experiences in the White House, he offered seven vital elements that future leaders must possess: inner mastery; a central, compelling purpose rooted in moral values; a capacity to persuade; an ability to work within the system; a sure, quick start; strong, prudent advisers; and a passion that inspires others to carry on the mission. Gergen's second book, Hearts Touched with Fire: How Great Leaders are Made, was published in 2022.

- Gergen, David (September 6, 2000). Eyewitness to Power: The Essence of Leadership, Nixon to Clinton. Simon & Schuster. ISBN 978-0-684-82663-9.
- Gergen, David (May 10, 2022). Hearts Touched with Fire: How Great Leaders are Made. Simon & Schuster. ISBN 978-1-982-17057-8.

== Personal life and death ==
Gergen and his wife Anne Elizabeth Gergen (nee Wilson), a family therapist, married in 1967. They lived in Cambridge, Massachusetts and had two children.

In December 2024, Gergen's daughter revealed that Gergen had Lewy body dementia. He died at a retirement home in Lexington, Massachusetts, on July 10, 2025, at age 83.

He is known to have been a correspondent with convicted sex criminal Jeffrey Epstein and appears in the US Department of Justice's released Epstein Files published by the DOJ in 2026.

== Awards and memberships ==
Gergen was active on many non-profit boards, and served on the boards of Yale and Duke Universities. Among them were Teach for America, City Year, Schwab Foundation, the Aspen Institute, and the advisory board for the Harvard Graduate School of Education. He also chaired the advisory board for the new School of Law at Elon University. He was a member of the D.C. Bar, the Council on Foreign Relations, and the North American executive committee for the Trilateral Commission. Gergen was awarded 27 honorary degrees.

=== Non-profit boards ===
Gergen was a member of the following non-profit boards:

- Aspen Institute
- Boston Museum Project
- Center for Global Development
- Center for the Study of the Presidency
- City Year
- The Mission Continues
- The National Campaign to Prevent Teen and Unplanned Pregnancy
- Morehouse College Leadership Institute
- Schwab Foundation for Social Enterprise,
- World Economic Forum
- Teach for America
- World Resources Institute
- Yale Corporation (former)

=== Advisory roles ===
Gergen also served as an advisor to the following groups:

- Chair, National Advisory Board, Elon University School of Law
- Co-chair, Inclusive America Project, Aspen Institute
- Member, Advisory Board, Harvard Graduate School of Education
- Member, North American Executive Committee, Trilateral Commission
- Former Chair, National Selection Committee for Innovations in American Government
- Former Co-chair, National Selection Committee, Top American Leaders (co-sponsored by The Washington Post and Center for Public Leadership)
- Former Chair, Smithsonian's National Portrait Gallery Peck Presidential Awards (for service to the U.S. presidency)
- Member, Selection committees for Fast Companys Social Capitalist Awards (best social entrepreneurs, U.S.)
- Judge, Civic Venture Purpose Prize Awards (citizens over 60 creating social change)
- Judge, Gleitsman Awards

== See also ==
- List of U.S. political appointments that crossed party lines

Political offices
Preceded by Margita White	White House Communications Director; 1976–1977	Vacant Title next held by Gerald Rafshoon
Preceded by Richard G. Hutcheson III	White House Staff Secretary; 1981	Succeeded by Richard Darman
Preceded by Frank Ursomarso	White House Communications Director; 1981–1984	Succeeded by Michael A. McManus Jr.
Preceded by Clayton Yeutter	Counselor to the President; 1993–1994	Succeeded by Bill Curry
