= State of Emergency (book) =

State of Emergency: The Third World Invasion and Conquest of America
- Author: Patrick Buchanan
- Language: English
- Subject: Illegal immigration
- Published: 2006
- Publication place: United States
- Media type: Print
- Pages: 320
- ISBN: 978-0312374365

State of Emergency: The Third World Invasion and Conquest of America is a 2006 book by American conservative Patrick Buchanan, in which the author criticizes the large number of illegal immigrants entering the United States, alleging that the influx constitutes a crisis with profound cultural, political, and economic impact on the country.

The book also contains a chapter called "Eurabia", which states that "Islamization of Europe is an unavoidable consequence, indeed, an inevitability, once Europe ceased to reproduce itself."

== Publication history ==
- Thomas Dunne Books (US), hardcover, 2006, ISBN 0-312-36003-7
- St. Martin's Griffin (US), paperback, 2007, ISBN 0-312-37436-4
