= Michael A. McManus Jr. =

American politician

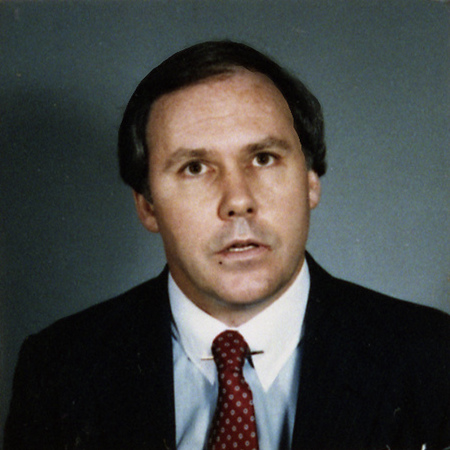

White House Communications Director
- In office January 15, 1984 – February 6, 1985
- President: Ronald Reagan
- Preceded by: David Gergen
- Succeeded by: Pat Buchanan

Personal details
- Born: March 11, 1943 (age 83) Boston, Massachusetts, U.S.
- Party: Republican
- Education: University of Notre Dame (BA); Georgetown University (JD)

Michael A. McManus Jr. (born March 11, 1943) is an American political strategist who served as White House Communications Director from 1984 to 1985 and now a Director at Novavax.

Political offices
| Preceded by David Gergen | White House Director of Communications; 1984–1985 | Succeeded by Pat Buchanan |
