= The Nightmare Years =

- Genre: Docudrama
- Based on: The Nightmare Years by William L. Shirer
- Screenplay by: Ian Curteis
- Story by: Christian Williams; Bob Woodward
- Directed by: Anthony Page
- Starring: Sam Waterston; Marthe Keller; Kurtwood Smith
- Composer: Vladimir Cosma
- Country of origin: United States
- Original language: English
- No. of episodes: 4

Production
- Executive producers: Boudjemaa Dahmane; Jacques Méthé; Gerald Rafshoon
- Producer: Graham Ford
- Production locations: Budapest, Hungary
- Cinematography: Ernest Vincze
- Editor: Keith Palmer
- Running time: 400 minutes
- Production companies: Consolidated Productions; Finnegan/Pinchuk Productions; Rafshoon Communications
- Budget: $12 million

Original release
- Network: Turner Network Television
- Release: September 17 – September 20, 1989

The Nightmare Years is a 1984 book by William L. Shirer, recounting his pre-WW2 years as a journalist in Nazi Germany.

It is also a 1989 American television miniseries directed by Anthony Page. It stars Sam Waterston as Shirer, the American reporter stationed in Nazi Germany in the 1930s. The supporting cast comprises Marthe Keller, Kurtwood Smith, Ronald Pickup, Peter Jeffrey, Walter Gotell and Garrick Hagon.

The miniseries premiered on Turner Network Television on September 17, 1989, as a four-part miniseries and was later released on VHS and DVD.

== Cast ==
- Sam Waterston as William L. Shirer
- Marthe Keller as Tess Shirer
- Kurtwood Smith as Joseph Goebbels
- Ronald Pickup as Ernst Hanfstaengl
- Peter Jeffrey as Norman Ebbutt
- Frederick Jaeger as Wilfred Bade
- Walter Gotell as Werner von Fritsch
- Garrick Hagon as Edward R. Murrow
- Michael Wolf as Hermann Göring
- Frances Barber as Helga Bauer

== Production ==
Principal photography took place in Budapest, Hungary. The production budget of the miniseries cost $12 million, of which TNT bought the television rights for $3 million.

== Episodes ==
No.	Title	Directed by	Written by	Original release date	U.S. viewers (millions)
1	"Part 1"	Anthony Page	Ian Curteis	September 17, 1989	Unknown
2	"Part 2"	Anthony Page	Ian Curteis	September 18, 1989	Unknown
3	"Part 3"	Anthony Page	Ian Curteis	September 19, 1989	Unknown
4	"Part 4"	Anthony Page	Ian Curteis	September 20, 1989	Unknown
