= Mary Gergen =

American psychologist (1938–2020)

Mary McCanney Gergen (December 12, 1938 – September 22, 2020) was an American social psychologist specializing in feminist studies women's studies and social constructionism. She is known for her contributions to the field of feminist studies, organization development, and social process.

== Biography ==
Gergen grew up on the plains of southwestern Minnesota, and later moved with her family to St. Louis Park, a suburb of Minneapolis. She obtained her B.S. in English and Education with a minor in speech and theatre at the University of Minnesota, where she was elected Phi Beta Kappa. She was a member of Delta Gamma sorority. Gergen later obtained her M.S. in Educational Psychology with a specialization in counseling at the University of Minnesota. Mary Gergen earned a Ph.D. at Temple University in social psychology.

Moving to Boston with her first husband, Michael Gebhart, and their two children, Lisa and Michael, she worked at Harvard University as a research assistant in the Social Relations Department, and later at the Harvard Business School in marketing. In 1969 she married Kenneth J. Gergen and moved to Rose Valley, Pennsylvania.

From the 1970s, she was a member of the American Psychological Association, and a founding member and fellow of Div. 35, The Society for the Psychology of Women.

In 1980, Mary Gergen earned a Ph.D. in psychology at Temple University, with a specialization in social psychology. She also worked for four years as a psychological consultant for AT&T on their longitudinal study of managers' lives.

Gergen began her teaching career at Penn State, Brandywine in 1984 as an assistant professor in psychology and women's studies. In 1988-89, Gergen was a fellow at the Netherlands Institute for Advanced Study. She won the George W. Atherton teaching award, a university wide honor, in 1966, and became a full professor. Gergen was given the title of Emerita upon retiring from the college in 2006.

In the early 1990s, she was one of the seven founders of The Taos Institute, a non-profit organization dedicated to the development of social constructionist ideas within diverse practice areas, including therapy, organizational consulting, and education. She was a co-creator of the positive aging newsletter healthandage.com, an electronically distributed news source designed to reconstruct the negative stereotype of aging, and to provide an alternative that is more promising in potential. She also edited the Tempo Book series. Mary Gergen traveled internationally to give lectures and workshops and served on examination committees and as an external examiner for Ph.D. theses from many countries, in addition to supervising several doctoral dissertations and teaching in a theoretical psychology program at Massey University, NZ.

== Work ==
Gergen’s major contributions focused on the intersection of feminist theory, and social constructionist ideas. Her attempt, at the outset, was to develop an alternative in studies of gender to both the hegemonic empiricist mode and the feminist standpoint orientation. This alternative grew from her engagement with social constructionist theory.

=== Towards a feminist methodology ===
Her first major effort to address this shift “Towards a feminist methodology” appeared in her edited book, Feminist Thought and the Structure of Knowledge in 1988. Later, her reader, Toward a New Psychology of Gender (1997), edited with Sara N. Davis, attempted to exemplify the new potentials for the field. Her work on gender issues was primarily qualitative, with a special emphasis on narrative methods. A major focus of this work was on gendered narratives, and their implications for women's careers. Towards the end of her life, her interest in narrative led her to a greater concern with narratives of nature, and the human-environmental connection.

=== Performative psychology ===
Gergen was an important figure in developing the field of performative psychology, in which dramatic presentations are featured as a way of both carrying out research and communicating with peers and the public. A pioneer of this approach in psychology, her first solo performance, “From Mod-Masculinity to Post-Mod Macho: A Feminist Re-play” was presented at a symposium on ‘Postmodernity and Psychology” in Aarhus, Denmark, June, 1989. In her writing she also attempted to expand beyond conventional forms in order to bring forth multiple perspectives and to challenge existing forms of order. Examples of this approach can be found in what may be her most important work, Reconstructing Psychology: Narrative, Gender and Performance (2001).

== Selected publications ==
- Feminist Reconstructions in Psychology. Narrative, Gender & Performance, Thousand Oaks, CA: Sage. ( 2001).
- Social Constructionism: A Reader. London: Sage, (2003) (Edited with K. J. Gergen).
- Social Constructionism: Entering the Dialogue (2004) Chagrin Falls, OH: Taos Institute Publications (With K. J. Gergen) Translated into Italian: La Costruzione Sociale come Dialogogo by Sadi Marhaba (2005). Padova: Logos Edizioni; Translated into French: Le Constructionism Social: Un Guide Pour Dialoguer by Alain Robiolio (2006). Brussels: SATAS.
- Communication as Social Construction: Readings, Research, Reconstruction 2008). Allyn & Bacon, (With K. J. Gergen & Stuart Schrader).
- Toward a New Psychology of Gender, New York: Routledge, 1997. (with Sara N. Davis).
- Feminist Thought and the Structure of Knowledge (Ed.).(1988) New York: NYU Press.
