= The Hotline =

Newspaper

- Type: Newsletter
- Format: electronic
- Owner: Atlantic Media
- Founders: Doug Bailey; Roger Craver
- Publisher: National Journal Group
- Editor-in-chief: Kirk Bado
- Founded: 1987; 38 years ago
- Language: English
- Headquarters: The Watergate; Washington, D.C., U.S.
- Sister newspapers: The National Journal
- ISSN: 1946-3472
- OCLC number: 45191522
- Website: www.nationaljournal.com/hotline

The Hotline is a daily political briefing published by Atlantic Media from its headquarters at the Watergate complex in Washington, D.C. Founded in 1987, It is currently led by editor-in-chief Kirk Bado and published independently until its acquisition in 1996 by National Journal Group, now a subsidiary of Atlantic Media. It is notable for being "the first aggregation of political news ever produced in the United States" and for being a leader in converting political newsletters from mere aggregations to include detailed analysis.

== Description ==
The Hotline is a bipartisan daily digest of the political events relating to upcoming statewide and national elections. In addition to condensing newspaper, magazine and digital political coverage from the previous 24 hours, it also includes analysis, both of specific races and broad trends. In addition to mass media, it includes analysis of TV ads and polls.

The Hotline's target audience includes Congressional staffers, political operatives and pundits. The Hotline reporters also contribute to its companion publication the National Journal. It comes out with two daily editions, the "Wake-Up Call" with headlines, and the "Latest Edition" with additional text and analysis.

== History ==
The Hotline was founded in 1987 as The Presidential Campaign Hotline, with he first edition in November 1987. It founded by Doug Bailey and Roger Craver who hired Bob Balkin as its editor.

Early issued were delivered by fax machine, and now it's delivered via the Internet.

Notable alumni include: Josh Kraushaar, Reid Wilson, Amy Walter, Chuck Todd, Stephen F. Hayes, Jonathan Martin, Mike Memoli, Shira T. Center, Marc Ambinder, Craig Crawford, Norah O'Donnell, Ken Rudin, John Mercurio and Adam Wollner.

== Criticism and acclaim ==
As editor, Bob Balkin helped turn The Hotline "into a must-read for anyone involved in politics and one that transcended the simple spreading of information to become an analytical and trusted voice among Washington insiders."

"I've always thought of Hotline fondly," reflected former President Bill Clinton in a 25th-anniversary video. "The day before the first cattle-call of the 1992 campaign, you all called me 'a Little Rock in a big pile.' So you can see why I'm both surprised and delighted that you've lasted 25 years. I'm a little surprised I've lasted 25 years. And I sincerely hope that you and I last another 25 more."
