= Kenneth J. Gergen =

American social psychologist

- Born: 12 December 1935 (age 90); Rochester, New York
- Citizenship: American
- Occupation: Psychologist

Academic background
- Education: Yale University; Duke University
- Thesis: Interactive goals and personalistic feedback as factors affecting the presentation of self (1963)
- Doctoral advisor: Edward E. Jones

Academic work
- Discipline: Social Psychology
- Sub-discipline: Social constructionism
- Institutions: Harvard University; Swarthmore College

Kenneth J. Gergen (born 1935) is an American social psychologist and emeritus professor at Swarthmore College. He obtained his Bachelor of Arts from Yale University (1957) and his PhD from Duke University (1963).

== Biography ==
Gergen was born in Rochester, New York in 1935. His parents were Aubigne Munger (née Lermond) and John Jay Gergen, the chair of the Mathematics Department at Duke University who has a series of lectures named in his honor. He had three brothers, one of whom is David Gergen, the prominent political analyst. Gergen grew up in Durham, North Carolina. After completing public schooling, he attended Yale University. Graduating in 1957, he subsequently became an officer in the United States Navy. He then returned to graduate school at Duke University, where he received his PhD in psychology in 1963. His dissertation advisor was Edward E. Jones. Gergen went on to become an assistant professor in the Department of Social Relations at Harvard University, where he also became the chairman of the board of tutors and advisors for the department and representative to the university's Council on Educational Policy.

In 1967, Gergen took a position as chair of the Department of Psychology at Swarthmore College, a position he held for ten years. Subsequently, he became the Gil and Frank Mustin Professor in Psychology. After his retirement (emeritus) in 2006, he took the position of Senior Research Professor. At various intervals, he served as visiting professor at the University of Heidelberg, the University of Marburg, the Sorbonne, the Sapienza University of Rome, Kyoto University, and Adolfo Ibanez University. At Swarthmore, he spearheaded the development of the academic concentration in interpretation theory. In an attempt to link his academic work to societal practices, he collaborated with colleagues to create the Taos Institute in 1993. He now serves as the president of the institute.

Gergen was married to Mary Gergen, who retired as professor emeritus at Penn State University. She was a major contributor to feminist psychology and performance inquiry, from 1969 until her death in 2020. She was the author of over 50 articles and was the co-author (with her husband) of books on social construction and performative social science. They published the Positive Aging Newsletter with a readership of around 20,000.

== Contributions ==
Gergen's earliest studies challenged the presumption of a unified or coherent self and argued that the person is not only socially constructed but varies depending upon context leading to the concept of the saturated self (Gergen, 1991, 1993). He then raised questions about the value of altruism, by exploring the ways in which helping others leads to the recipient's resentment and alienation.

A major point in Gergen's career was his 1973 article "Social Psychology as History". In the article, he argues that while empirical research attempts to establish general laws or principles, the empirical support is always derived from historically situated observations. Yet, because patterns of human action undergo continuous change, support for any principle may wax or wane over time. Further, the scientific knowledge of the laws and principles of social interaction are variable over time, and that the scientific knowledge generated by social psychologists actually influences the phenomena it is meant to passively describe. For example, studying obedience to authority may reduce the likelihood of obedience. He argued therefore that social psychology was not fundamentally a cumulative science, but was effectively engaged in the recording and transformation of cultural life. The article proved widely controversial, and was ultimately listed as a "citation classic" in the Social Science Citation Index. Also contributing to what was called "the crisis in social psychology"[3] was Gergen's subsequent publication on generative theory. Here he proposed that, because theoretical suppositions were not so much recordings of social life as creators, theories should not be judged so much by their integration of "what is" as their potential to open new spaces of action.

Combining these ideas with developments in literary and critical theory, along with the history of science, Gergen went on to develop a radical view of socially constructed knowledge. This view was proposed as a successor project to what Gergen considered an inherently flawed positivist conception of knowledge. From Gergen's perspective, all human intelligibility (including claims to knowledge) is generated within relationships. It is from relationships that humans derive their conceptions of what is real, rational, and good. From this perspective, scientific theories, like all other reality posits, should not be assessed in terms of truth, but in terms of pragmatic outcomes. Such assessments are inevitably wedded to values, and thus all science is morally and politically weighted in implication. As he saw it, this same form of assessment also applies to social constructionist theory. The question is not its accuracy, but its potentials for humankind.

This latter conclusion informed most of Gergen's subsequent work, in areas including therapy and counseling, education, organizational change, technology, conflict reduction, civil society, and qualitative inquiry. In one form or another, this work is concerned with transforming social life. For the most part, his preferred direction of change is toward more collaborative and participatory relationships. Additionally, he has been concerned with fostering a "relational" view of the self, where the "traditional emphasis on the individual mind is replaced by a concern with the relational processes from which rationality and morality emerge." He is also known for his comment "I am linked therefore I am" as an answer to Descartes' proposition "I think, therefore I am". Most of these developments are summarized in Relational Being, Beyond the Individual and Community, which attempts to demonstrate that what are considered mental processes are not so much "in the head" as in relationships. It also attempts to answer charges of moral relativism with a non-foundational morality of collaborative practice, and to outline a way to bring science together with concerns for the sacred.

He has played a central role in the development of social constructionism, relational theory, and their professional applications. He has also considered relations between ethics in a pluralistic world and qualitative inquiry in the social sciences; explanations of human action, and reconstructing the conception of ageing.

Gergen has been President of two divisions of the American Psychological Association - the Division on Theoretical and Philosophical Psychology and Division of Psychology and the Arts. He has served on the editorial board of 35 journals, was the Associate Editor of The American Psychologist and was co-founder of Theory and Psychology and Qualitative Psychology.

== Notable concepts ==
Concepts that Gergen has written about include:

- Enlightenment effects. The moral and political effects on cultural behavior of disseminating scientific knowledge. ("Social psychology as history")
- Generative theory: Theory that unsettles common assumptions, and opens up possibilities or new forms of action. ("Toward generative theory")
- Deficit discourse: By constructing the world, and particularly individuals, in terms of problems, there is an objectification of deficit and a suppression of positive possibilities. (Realities and Relationships)
- Cycle of progressive infirmity: With the dissemination of information about categories of mental illness, people come to see themselves in these terms. As a result, they seek help from the mental health professions, which are in turn, expanded in numbers. With the expansion of the mental health industry, new diagnostic categories are developed and disseminated. The society becomes progressively infirmed. (Realities and Relationships)
- Multiphrenia: The condition, largely attributed to technologies that increase social contact, of being simultaneously drawn in multiple and conflicting directions. (The Saturated Self)
- Pregression. To unsettle the modernist value placed on progress, the proposal that for every change that is effected in societal life, the repercussions will unsettle multiple conditions that people define as positive. (The Saturated Self)
- Positive aging: As an alternative to the pervasive view of aging as decline (deficit discourse), it is possible to discover and construct myriad ways of creating later life as a period of unparalleled growth and enrichment.
- First and second order morality: All collaborative relationships will be about some understanding of the good. With multiple groups proclaiming their own good, the stage is set for interminable conflict. Second order morality is achieved through practices that bring otherwise embattled groups into a condition of positive collaboration. (Relational Being)
- Transformative dialogue: Forms of dialogic practice that dissolve the barriers of meaning separating otherwise conflicted parties. (Relational Being)
- Co-action. One's actions have no meaning in themselves, but come into meaning through another's collaborative action. At the same time, another's potentially collaborative actions only become so as they are supplemented. All human intelligibility emerges not from individual actors but through co-action. (Relational Being)
- Multi-being. What is commonly viewed as the individual subject is the common intersection of multiple relationships. (Relational Being)
- Future forming research. In a world of increasingly rapid change, research focused on what is currently the case rapidly loses relevance. As a result, research should shift its emphasis to creating the future. Action research is illustrative.

== Awards ==
Gergen has received research grants from the National Science Foundation, the Deutsche Forschungsgemeinschaft, and the Barra Foundation. His work has merited awards from the American Psychological Association, the National Communication Association, the University of Buenos Aires, Adolfo Ibanez University in Santiago, Nanjing Normal University, and Absalon University College in Denmark. Gergen received the Distinguished Alumni Award from the Graduate School of Duke University in 2017, and in 2018 was listed as one of the 50 most influential living psychologists in the world (The Best Schools). He has received fellowships from the Guggenheim Foundation, the Fulbright Foundation, and the Alexander von Humboldt Foundation. He also holds honorary degrees from Tilburg University, Saybrook Graduate School, and the University of Athens.

== Bibliography ==
Books (selected)

- Toward Transformation in Social Knowledge. New York: Springer-Verlag, 1982. Second Edition, London: Sage, 1994. ISBN 978-0-387-90673-7
- Historical Social Psychology. Hillsdale, NJ: Erlbaum 1984, (edited with M. Gergen). ISBN 978-0-89859-349-5
- The Social Construction of the Person. New York: Springer-Verlag, 1985 (edited with K. E. Davis). ISBN 978-0-387-96091-3
- The Saturated Self, Dilemmas of Identity in Contemporary Life. New York: Basic Books. 1991; 2nd. Ed. 2001. ISBN 0-465-07186-4
- Therapy as Social Construction. London: Sage (1991). (edited with S. McNamee). ISBN 978-0-8039-8302-1
- Refiguring Self and Psychology. Hampshire: Dartmouth Publishing.ISBN 1-855-21369-9
- Realities and Relationships, Soundings in Social Construction. Cambridge, Harvard University Press. 1994 ISBN 978-0-674-74930-6
- Relational Responsibility. Thousand Oaks, CA.: Sage. 1999 With S. McNamee ISBN 978-0-7619-1093-0
- An Invitation to Social Construction. London: Sage, 1999. 3d ed 2015 ISBN 0-8039-8377-8
- Social Construction in Context. London: Sage, 2001. ISBN 0-7619-6545-9
- Therapeutic Realities, Collaboration, Oppression and Relational Flow. Chagrin Falls, OH: Taos Institute Publications. 2006 ISBN 978-0-7880-2166-4
- Relational Being. New York: Oxford University Press. 2009 ISBN 978-0-19-530538-8
- Gergen, Kenneth J., & Thatchenkery, Tojo Joseph (2004) [1998], "Organizational Science in a Postmodern Context", in Robert C.H. Chia (ed.), In the Realm of Organisation: Essays for Robert Cooper, London: Routledge, ISBN 0-415-12699-1 ISBN 0-203-26727-3 (Adobe eReader Format). Essay originally published 1996. See article listing below.
- Playing with Purpose: Adventures in Performative Social Science. Lanham, Md: Alta Mira Press. (2012) With M. Gergen

Articles (selected)

- Gergen, Kenneth J (1973), "Social Psychology as History" (PDF), Journal of Personality and Social Psychology, 26 (2): 309–320, doi:10.1037/h0034436, archived from the original (PDF) on 14 April 2011
- Gergen, K.J (1978), "Experimentation in Social Psychology: A Reappraisal", European Journal of Social Psychology, 8 (4): 507–527, doi:10.1002/ejsp.2420080407
- Gergen, K.J (1978), "Toward Generative Theory" (PDF), Journal of Personality and Social Psychology, 36 (11): 1344–1360, doi:10.1037/0022-3514.36.11.1344, archived from the original (PDF) on 14 April 2011 (Scroll down to page 3 for article).
- Gergen, K.J (March 1985), "The Social Constructionist Movement in Modern Psychology" (PDF), American Psychologist, 40 (3): 266–275, doi:10.1037/0003-066X.40.3.266, archived from the original (PDF) on 22 November 2009
- Gergen, K.J (1989), "Social Psychology and the Wrong Revolution", European Journal of Social Psychology, 19 (5): 463–484, doi:10.1002/ejsp.2420190513
- Gergen, Kenneth J., & Thatchenkery, Tojo Joseph (1996), "Organizational Science in a Postmodern Context" (PDF), Journal of Applied Behavioral Science, 32: 356–378, doi:10.1177/0021886396324002, S2CID 145535793, archived from the original (PDF) on 14 April 2011 See also chapter in book, listed above.
- Gergen, K.J (October 2001), "Psychological Science in a Postmodern Context" (PDF), American Psychologist, 56 (10): 803–813, doi:10.1037/0003-066x.56.10.803, PMID 11675987, archived from the original (PDF) on 14 April 2011
- Gergen, K.J (2007), "Relativism, Religion, and Relational Being" (PDF), Common Knowledge, Symposium: "A Dictatorship of Relativism?”, 13 (2–3): 362–378, doi:10.1215/0961754X-2007-011, S2CID 144229840, archived from the original (PDF) on 14 April 2011
- Gergen, K.J. (2015) "From Mirroring to World-Making: Research as Future Forming." Journal for the Theory of Social Behaviour, 45: 287–310.(Winner of the 2014 essay competition, Independent Social Research Foundation, London, UK)
- Gergen, K.J. (2018) The Limits of Language as the Limits of Psychological Explanation. Theory and Psychology. (1–15) DOI: 10.1177/09593543 1881 1641
