= Gerald Rafshoon =

White House Communications Director, TV producer

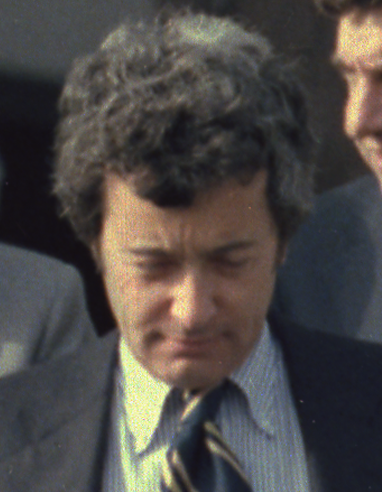

White House Communications Director
- In office July 1, 1978 – August 14, 1979
- President: Jimmy Carter
- Preceded by: David Gergen (1977)
- Succeeded by: Frank Ursomarso (1981)

Personal details
- Born: Gerald Monroe Rafshoon; January 11, 1934 (age 92) New York City, New York, U.S.
- Party: Democratic
- Education: University of Texas at Austin (BA)

Gerald Monroe Rafshoon (born January 11, 1934) is an American television producer and political operative. He is one of the four founding members of Unity08, and was the White House Communications Director under the presidency of Jimmy Carter. In doing so, Rafshoon became the first professional advertising executive to join the White House staff.

== Early life and education ==
Born in New York, Rafhsoon is a graduate of University of Texas. He served in the United States Navy for three years.

== Career ==
Rafshoon started his own advertising agency in Atlanta in 1963, after working at 20th Century Fox in Atlanta and New York.

In 1966, Rafshoon decided to join Carter's 1966 campaign for governor of Georgia, after hearing a bad campaign jingle on the radio while driving. In 1976, Rafshoon was the architect of the advertising and public relations campaign that helped Carter, then a mostly unknown Southern governor and peanut farmer, become President of the United States.

Following his White House years, Rafshoon began producing motion pictures and television programs. He is a specialist in international co-productions working closely with the leading television networks and production companies in Europe and filming in Europe, the Middle East, and Africa.

In January 2008, Rafshoon and fellow Unity08 co-founder Doug Bailey left that organization to launch a national effort to draft New York City Mayor Michael Bloomberg to run for President of the United States as an independent candidate.

== Television productions ==
Rafshoon has produced 52 hours of television and cable entertainment for U.S. and international networks. Among them are two Emmy Award-winning programs and three Emmy nominees. They include:

- Circle of Violence starring Tuesday Weld, Geraldine Fitzgerald, and River Phoenix
- The Atlanta Child Murders starring Morgan Freeman, Jason Robards, Rip Torn, Martin Sheen, and James Earl Jones
- The Nightmare Years starring Sam Waterston, the story of William L. Shirer and the Nazi Germany propaganda machine
- Joseph starring Ben Kingsley and Martin Landau
- Running Mates, a political comedy drama starring Tom Selleck, Laura Linney, Faye Dunaway, and Terry Hatcher.
- Georgetown, a dramatic series for CBS starring Helen Mirren

Rafshoon also produced an Emmy-winning documentary series Decisions That Shook the World about important controversial decisions made by American presidents that defined their character and affected the course of history.

== Television work ==
According to Namebase, Gerald Rafshoon is mentioned in the following books:

- Greider's Secrets of the Temple 1989 (47)
- Hertsgaard's On Bended Knee 1988 (23, 38–9)
- Jones's The Politics of Money 1991 (215)
- Kilian & Sawislak's Who Runs Washington? 1982 (56)

Political offices
Vacant Title last held by David Gergen	White House Communications Director; 1978–1979	Vacant Title next held by Frank Ursomarso
