= John Jay Gergen =

American mathematician (1903–1967)

John Jay Gergen (April 17, 1903 – January 16, 1967) was an American mathematician who introduced the Lebesgue–Gergen criterion for convergence of a Fourier series.

Gergen was born in Saint Paul, Minnesota, the son of Cora (Johnson) and John Andrew Gergen. He received a B.A. from the University of Minnesota in 1925 and a Ph.D. from Rice University in 1928. His doctoral advisors were Griffith C. Evans and Szolem Mandelbrojt. From 1928 to 1930, as a National Research fellow, Gergen visited Princeton University, Oxford University, the University of Paris, and the University of Clermont. From 1930 to 1933 he was a Benjamin Peirce Instructor at Harvard University, and from 1933 to 1936 he was an assistant professor at the University of Rochester. He was the chairman of the Department of Mathematics at Duke University from 1937 to July 1966. His doctoral students include Walter Rudin. He married Aubigne Lermond during 1931, and had four sons: John Andrew Gergen, Stephen Lermond Gergen, presidential adviser and Harvard Kennedy School professor David Richmond Gergen, and Swarthmore College psychology professor Kenneth Jay Gergen.
