= Pat Buchanan =

American politician and commentator (born 1938)

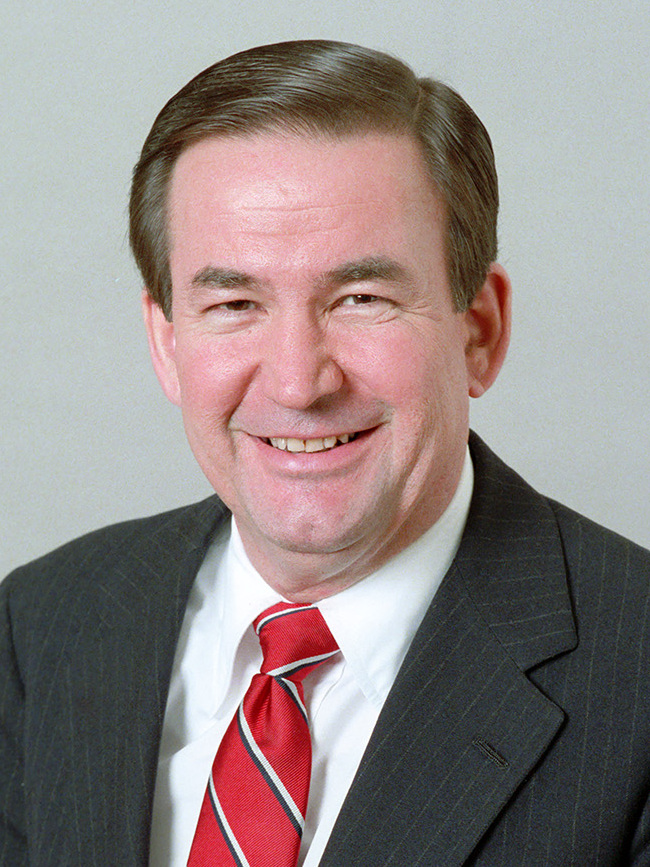
- Buchanan in 1985

White House Communications Director
- In office February 6, 1985 – March 1, 1987
- President: Ronald Reagan
- Preceded by: Michael A. McManus Jr.
- Succeeded by: Jack Koehler

Personal details
- Born: Patrick Joseph Buchanan; November 2, 1938 (age 88) Washington, D.C., U.S.
- Party: Republican (before 1999, 2004–present)
- Other political affiliations: Reform (1999–2002); Independent (2002–2004)
- Spouse: Shelley Scarney (m. 1971)
- Education: Georgetown University (BA); Columbia University (MA)

Patrick Joseph Buchanan (/bjuːˈkænən/ bew-KAN-ən; born November 2, 1938) is an American retired writer, political commentator, and political advisor. He was an assistant and special consultant to U.S. presidents Richard Nixon, Gerald Ford, and Ronald Reagan. An influential figure within paleoconservatism, a nationalist and traditionalist strain of conservatism in the United States, Buchanan is also associated with right-wing populism. Many observers consider Buchanan's politics a predecessor to Trumpism and the contemporary postliberal New Right.

Buchanan was born in Washington, D.C. in 1938. In 1992 and 1996, Buchanan sought the Republican presidential nomination. In 1992, he ran against incumbent president George H. W. Bush, campaigning against Bush's breaking of his "Read my lips: no new taxes" pledge, as well as his foreign policy, his trade and immigration policy, and his positions on social issues. At the 1992 Republican National Convention, Buchanan delivered his "culture war" speech in support of the nominated President Bush. In 1996, he ran against eventual Republican nominee Bob Dole, but withdrew after getting only 21 percent of Republican primary votes. In 2000, he was the Reform Party's presidential nominee. His campaign centered on non-interventionism in foreign affairs, opposition to illegal immigration, and opposition to the outsourcing of manufacturing from free trade. He selected educator and conservative activist Ezola Foster as his running-mate. Despite his own terminology of self-identification, expressed in the desire to be called a "supporter of the doctrine of disengagement", his foreign policy views have been categorized as isolationist.

In 2002, Buchanan co-founded The American Conservative magazine and launched a foundation named The American Cause. He has been published in The Occidental Observer, Human Events, National Review, The Nation, and Rolling Stone. The original host on CNN's Crossfire, he was a political commentator on the MSNBC cable network, including the show Morning Joe until February 2012, later appearing on Fox News. Buchanan was also a regular panelist on The McLaughlin Group. Many of his views, particularly his opposition to American imperialism and the managerial state, echo those of the Old Right Republicans of the first half of the 20th century. Starting in 2006, Buchanan had been a frequent contributor to alt-right and anti-immigration website VDARE until his retirement in 2023.

== Early life and education ==
Patrick Joseph Buchanan was born in Washington, D.C., on November 2, 1938, to William Baldwin Buchanan (1905–1988), a partner in an accounting firm, and Catherine Elizabeth Crum (1911–1995), a nurse and homemaker.

Buchanan had six brothers, Brian, Henry, James, John, Thomas, and William Jr., and two sisters, Kathleen and Angela, who served as U.S. Treasurer during the Presidency of Ronald Reagan. Buchanan's father was of Irish, English, and Scottish ancestry, and his mother was of German descent. He had a great-grandfather who fought in the American Civil War in the Confederate States Army, which earned Buchanan membership in the Sons of Confederate Veterans. He admires Robert E. Lee, Douglas MacArthur, and Joseph McCarthy.

Buchanan described his Southern ancestry, writing:

I have family roots in the South, in Mississippi. When the Civil War came, Cyrus Baldwin enlisted and did not survive Vicksburg. William Buchanan of Okolona, who would marry Baldwin's daughter, fought at Atlanta and was captured by General Sherman. William Baldwin Buchanan was the name given to my father and by him to my late brother. As a member of the Sons of Confederate Veterans, I have been to their gatherings. I spoke at the 2001 SCV convention in Lafayette, LA. The Military Order of the Stars and Bars presented me with a battle flag and a wooden canteen like the ones my ancestors carried.

Buchanan was born into a Catholic family and attended Catholic schools, including the Jesuit-run Gonzaga College High School in Washington, D.C. He then attended Georgetown University, where he participated in, but did not complete, the Reserve Officers' Training Corps (ROTC) program. In 1960, he graduated with a bachelor's degree in English. He subsequently received his draft notice, but the District of Columbia Draft Board exempted Buchanan from military service because of reactive arthritis, classifying him as 4-F. He then attended the Graduate School of Journalism at Columbia University, where he wrote his thesis on the expanding trade between Canada and Cuba and was awarded a master's degree in journalism in 1962.

== Career ==
=== St. Louis Globe-Democrat editorial writer ===
Buchanan in 1968

After receiving his master's degree, at age 23, Buchanan joined the St. Louis Globe-Democrat. In 1961, during the first year of the U.S. embargo against Cuba following the Cuban Revolution, trade between Canada and Cuba tripled. The Globe-Democrat published a rewrite of Buchanan's Columbia master's project under the eight-column banner "Canada sells to Red Cuba — And Prospers" eight weeks after Buchanan started at the paper. In his memoir, Right from the Beginning, he considered the column a career milestone, though he later said the embargo against Cuba strengthened the communist regime and opposed it. In 1964, Buchanan was promoted to assistant editorial page editor, and he supported Barry Goldwater's presidential campaign that year, though the Globe-Democrat did not endorse Goldwater. Buchanan speculated there was a clandestine agreement between the newspaper and incumbent U.S. president Lyndon B. Johnson. Buchanan recalled, "the conservative movement has always advanced from its defeats...I can't think of a single conservative who was sorry about the Goldwater campaign."

Buchanan authored the foreword to several editions of Goldwater's book, The Conscience of a Conservative. He was a member of Young Americans for Freedom, for which he wrote press releases. In 1965, he was executive assistant at Nixon, Mudge, Rose, Guthrie, Alexander, and Mitchell, the law firm where Richard Nixon launched his political comeback following his losses in the 1960 presidential election and 1962 California gubernatorial election.

=== Nixon White House ===
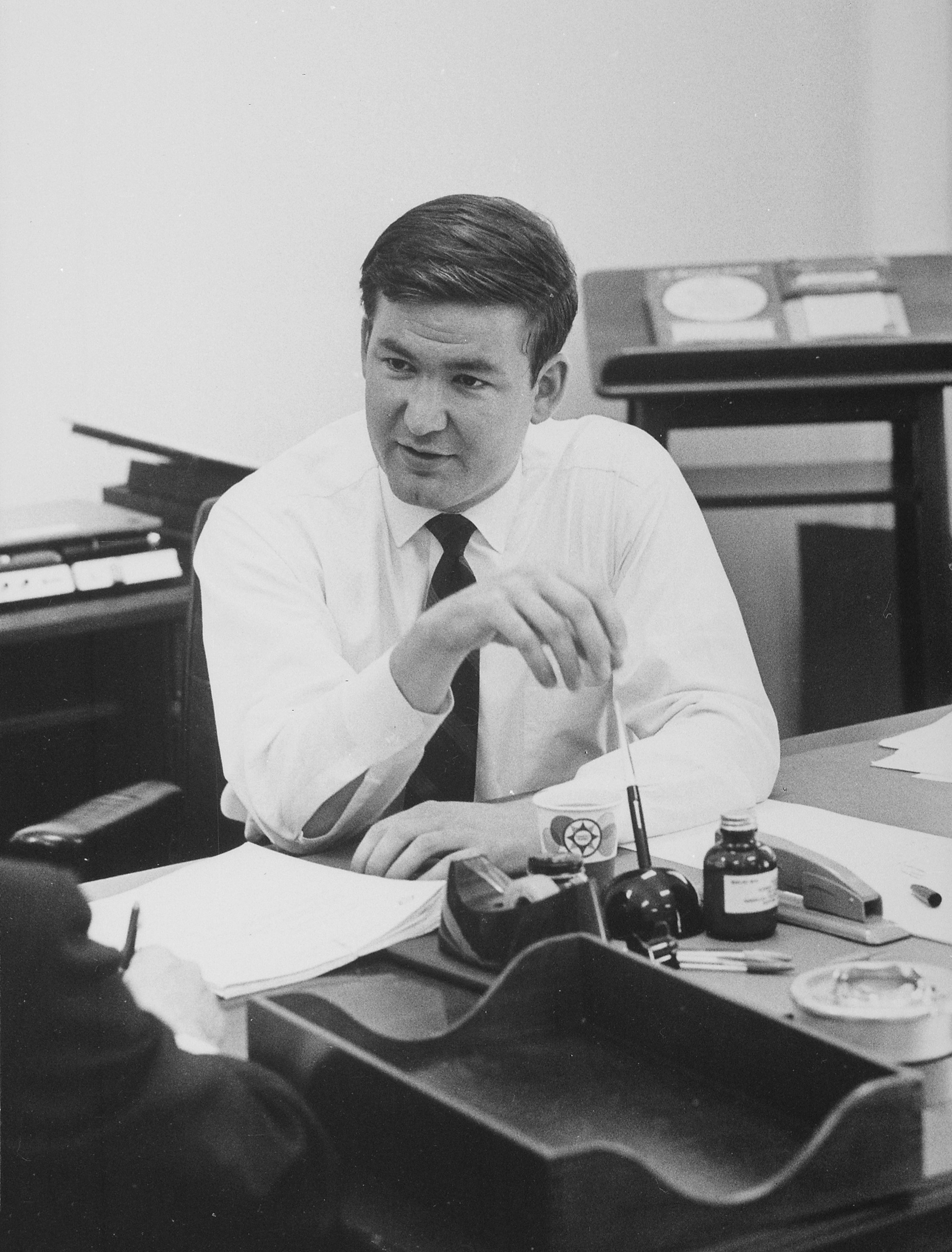
Buchanan in 1969

The next year, he was the first adviser hired by Nixon's presidential campaign; he worked primarily as an opposition researcher. The highly partisan speeches Buchanan wrote were consciously aimed at Richard Nixon's dedicated supporters, for which his colleagues soon nicknamed him Mr. Inside. Buchanan traveled with Nixon throughout the campaigns of 1966 and 1968. He made tours around Western Europe, Africa, and following the Six-Day War, the Middle East.

During the course of Nixon's presidency, Buchanan became entrusted on press relations, policy positions, and political strategy. Early on during Nixon's presidency, Buchanan worked as a White House assistant and speechwriter for Nixon and Vice President Spiro Agnew. He coined the phrase "Silent Majority," and helped shape the strategy that drew millions of Democrats to Nixon. In a 1972 memo, he suggested the White House "should move to re-capture the anti-Establishment tradition or theme in American politics." His daily assignments included developing political strategy, publishing the President's Daily News Summary, and preparing briefing books for news conferences. He accompanied Nixon on his trip to China in 1972 and the summit in Moscow, Yalta and Minsk in 1974. He suggested that Nixon label Democratic opponent George McGovern an extremist and burn the White House tapes. Buchanan later argued that Nixon would have survived the Watergate scandal with his reputation intact if he had burnt the tapes.

Buchanan remained as a special assistant to Nixon through the final days of the Watergate scandal. He was not accused of wrongdoing, though some mistakenly suspected him of being Deep Throat. In 2005 when the actual identity of the press leak was revealed as Federal Bureau of Investigation Associate Director Mark Felt, Buchanan called him "sneaky," "dishonest" and "criminal." Because of his role in the Nixon campaign's "attack group," Buchanan appeared before the Senate Watergate Committee on September 26, 1973. He told the panel: "The mandate that the American people gave to this president and his administration cannot, and will not, be frustrated or repealed or overthrown as a consequence of the incumbent tragedy".

When Nixon resigned in 1974, Buchanan briefly stayed on as special assistant under incoming President Gerald Ford. Chief of Staff Alexander Haig offered Buchanan his choice of three open ambassador posts, including South Africa, for which Buchanan opted. President Ford initially signed off on the appointment, but then rescinded it after it was prematurely reported in the Evans-Novak Political Report and caused controversy, especially among the U.S. diplomatic corps.

Buchanan remarked about Watergate: "The lost opportunity to move against the political forces frustrating the expressed national will ... To effect a political counterrevolution in the capital— ... there is no substitute for a principled and dedicated man of the Right in the Oval Office".

Long after his resignation, Nixon called Buchanan a confidant and said he was neither a racist nor an antisemite nor a bigot or "hater," but a "decent, patriotic American." Nixon said Buchanan had "some strong views," such as his "isolationist" foreign policy, with which he disagreed. While Nixon did not think Buchanan should become president, he said the commentator "should be heard." However, according to a memo President Nixon sent to John Ehrlichman in 1970, Nixon characterized Buchanan's attitude towards integration as "segregation forever." Following Nixon's re-election in 1972, Buchanan himself had written in a memo to Nixon suggesting he should not "fritter away his present high support in the nation for an ill-advised governmental effort to forcibly integrate races."

=== News commentator ===
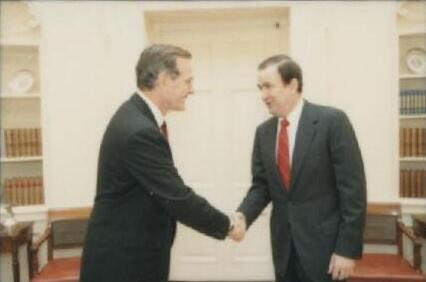
Buchanan greeting President George H. W. Bush in 1989

Buchanan returned to his column and began regular appearances as a broadcast host and political commentator. He co-hosted a three-hour daily radio show with liberal columnist Tom Braden called the Buchanan-Braden Program. He delivered daily commentaries on NBC radio from 1978 to 1984. Buchanan started his TV career as a regular on The McLaughlin Group and CNN's Crossfire (inspired by Buchanan-Braden) and Capital Gang, making him nationally recognizable. His several stints on Crossfire occurred between 1982 and 1999; his sparring partners included Braden, Michael Kinsley, Geraldine Ferraro, and Bill Press.

Buchanan was a regular panelist on The McLaughlin Group. He appeared most Sundays alongside John McLaughlin and the more liberal Newsweek journalist Eleanor Clift. His columns are syndicated nationally by Creators Syndicate.

=== Reagan White House ===
Buchanan served as White House Communications Director from February 1985 to March 1987. In a speech to the National Religious Broadcasters in 1986, Buchanan said of the Reagan administration: "Whether President Reagan has charted a new course that will set our compass for decades—or whether history will see him as the conservative interruption in a process of inexorable national decline—is yet to be determined".

A year later, he remarked that "the greatest vacuum in American politics is to the right of Ronald Reagan." While her brother was working for Reagan, Bay Buchanan started a "Buchanan for President" movement in June 1986. She said the conservative movement needed a leader, but Buchanan was initially ambivalent. After leaving the White House, he returned to his column and Crossfire. Out of respect for Jack Kemp he sat out the 1988 race, although Kemp later became his adversary.

== Political campaigns ==
Logo used for Buchanan's 1992 and 1996 campaigns

=== 1992 presidential primaries ===
Buchanan was highly critical of the foreign and economic policies of the George H. W. Bush administration, particularly Bush's breaking of his 1988 "Read my lips: no new taxes" pledge. In 1990, Buchanan published a newsletter called Patrick J. Buchanan: From the Right; it sent subscribers a bumper sticker reading: "Read Our Lips! No new taxes." In the 1992 Republican Party presidential primaries, Buchanan challenged Bush in his bid for re-nomination by the Republican Party, launching his campaign in December 1991 chaired by William von Raab. He ran on a platform of paleoconservatism that emphasized national sovereignty, limited spending and bringing troops home from abroad. He failed to win any primaries, but finished a strong second in the New Hampshire primary and was regarded as forcing Bush to walk back his economic policies. The Buchanan campaign ran a number of radio and TV spots criticizing Bush's policies; in one, Buchanan accused Bush of being a "trade wimp", while another attacked him for presiding over the National Endowment of the Arts, which he said "invested our tax dollars in pornographic and blasphemous art too shocking to show."

In 1992, Buchanan explained his reasons for challenging the incumbent, President George H. W. Bush:

If the country wants to go in a liberal direction, if the country wants to go in the direction of [Democrats] George Mitchell and Tom Foley, it doesn't bother me as long as I've made the best case I can. What I can't stand are the back-room deals. They're all in on it, the insider game, the establishment game—this is what we're running against.

Buchanan ran on a platform of immigration reduction and social conservatism, including opposition to multiculturalism, abortion, and gay rights. Buchanan challenged Bush (whose popularity was waning) when he won 38% of the New Hampshire primary. In the primary elections, Buchanan garnered three million total votes or 23% of the vote.

Buchanan later threw his support behind Bush and delivered an address at the 1992 Republican National Convention, which became known as the culture war speech, in which he described "a religious war going on in our country for the soul of America." In the speech, he said of Bill and Hillary Clinton:

The agenda Clinton & Clinton would impose on America—abortion on demand, a litmus test for the Supreme Court, homosexual rights, discrimination against religious schools, women in combat units—that's change, all right. But it is not the kind of change America needs. It is not the kind of change America wants. And it is not the kind of change we can abide in a nation we still call God's country.

Buchanan also said, in reference to the then recently held 1992 Democratic National Convention, "Like many of you last month, I watched that giant masquerade ball at Madison Square Garden—where 20,000 radicals and liberals came dressed up as moderates and centrists—in the greatest single exhibition of cross-dressing in American political history."

The contents of Buchanan's speech prompted his detractors to claim that the speech alienated moderate voters from the Bush-Quayle ticket. The newspaper columnist Molly Ivins wrote: "Many people did not care for Pat Buchanan's speech; it probably sounded better in the original German."

=== After the 1992 campaign ===
After the campaign, Buchanan returned to Crossfire, The McLaughlin Group, and his column. To promote the principles of federalism, traditional values, and anti-intervention, he founded The American Cause, a conservative educational foundation, in 1993. His sister Angela serves as the Vienna, VA-based foundation's president and Pat is its chairman.

Buchanan returned to radio as host of Buchanan and Company, a three-hour talk show for Mutual Broadcasting System on July 5, 1993. It pitted him against liberal co-hosts, including Barry Lynn, Bob Beckel, and Chris Matthews, in a time slot opposite Rush Limbaugh's show. To launch his 1996 campaign, Buchanan left the program on March 20, 1995.

=== 1996 presidential primaries ===
Buchanan ran for the Republican nomination again in 1996. He was endorsed by conservative Phyllis Schlafly, and others.

In February, the liberal Center for Public Integrity issued a report claiming Buchanan's presidential campaign co-chairman, Larry Pratt, appeared at two meetings organized by white supremacist and militia leaders. Pratt denied any ties to these individuals, calling the report an orchestrated smear before the New Hampshire primary. Buchanan told the conservative Manchester Union Leader he believed Pratt. Pratt took a leave of absence "to answer these charges," "so as not to have distraction in the campaign."

In the February New Hampshire primary, Buchanan defeated front-runner Bob Dole by about 3,000 votes. Buchanan won three other states (Alaska, Missouri, and Louisiana), and finished only slightly behind Dole in the Iowa caucus. His insurgent campaign used his soaring rhetoric to mobilize grass-roots right-wing opinion against what he saw as the bland Washington establishment (personified by Dole) which he believed had controlled the party for years. At a rally later in Nashua, he said:

We shocked them in Alaska. Stunned them in Louisiana. Stunned them in Iowa. They are in a terminal panic. They hear the shouts of the peasants from over the hill. All the knights and barons will be riding into the castle pulling up the drawbridge in a minute. All the peasants are coming with pitchforks. We're going to take this over the top.

External videos
- Booknotes interview with Buchanan on The Great Betrayal, May 17, 1998, C-SPAN

In the Super Tuesday primaries Dole defeated Buchanan by large margins. Having collected only 21%, or 3.1 million, of the total votes in Republican primaries, Buchanan suspended his campaign in March. He declared that, if Dole were to choose a pro-choice running mate, he would run as the US Taxpayers Party (now Constitution Party) candidate. Dole chose Jack Kemp, and he received Buchanan's endorsement.

=== After the 1996 campaign ===
After the campaign, Buchanan returned to Crossfire, The McLaughlin Group, and his column. He also began a series of books with 1998's The Great Betrayal.

=== 2000 presidential campaign ===
The logo used by Buchanan and the Reform Party in the 2000 presidential election

Buchanan announced his departure from the Republican Party in October 1999, disparaging them (along with the Democrats) as a "beltway party." He sought the nomination of the Reform Party. Many reformers backed Iowa physicist John Hagelin, whose platform was based on Transcendental Meditation. Party founder Ross Perot did not endorse either candidate for the Reform Party's nomination. (In late October 2000, Perot publicly endorsed George W. Bush, but Perot's 1996 running-mate, Pat Choate, would go on to endorse Buchanan.)

Supporters of Hagelin charged the results of the party's open primary, which favored Buchanan by a wide margin, were "tainted." The Reform Party divisions led to dual conventions being held simultaneously in separate areas of the Long Beach Convention Center complex. Both conventions' delegates ignored the primary ballots and voted to nominate their presidential candidates from the floor, similar to the Democratic and Republican conventions. One convention nominated Buchanan while the other backed Hagelin, with each camp claiming to be the legitimate Reform Party.

Ultimately, when the Federal Elections Commission ruled Buchanan was to receive ballot status as the Reform candidate, as well as about $12.6 million in federal campaign funds secured by Perot's showing in the 1996 election, Buchanan won the nomination. In his acceptance speech, Buchanan proposed US withdrawal from the United Nations and expelling the United Nations Headquarters from New York, abolishing the Internal Revenue Service, Department of Education, Department of Energy, Department of Housing and Urban Development, taxes on inheritance and capital gains, and affirmative action programs.

As his running mate, Buchanan chose Ezola B. Foster, an African American activist and retired teacher from Los Angeles. Buchanan was supported in this election run by future Socialist Party USA presidential candidate Brian Moore, who said in 2008 he supported Buchanan in 2000 because "he was for fair trade over free trade. He had some progressive positions that I thought would be helpful to the common man." On August 19, the New York Right to Life Party, in convention, chose Buchanan as their nominee, with 90% of the districts voting for him.

In a campaign speech at Bob Jones University in Greenville, South Carolina, Buchanan attempted to rally his conservative base:

God and the Ten Commandments have all been expelled from the public schools. Christmas carols are out. Christmas holidays are out. The latest decision of the United States Supreme Court said that children in stadiums or young people in high school games are not to speak an inspirational moment for fear they may mention God's name, and offend an atheist in the grandstand ... We may not succeed, but I believe we need a new fighting conservative traditionalist party in America. I believe, and I hope that one day we can take America back. That is why we are building this Gideon's army and heading for Armageddon, to do battle for the Lord.

In the 2000 presidential election, Buchanan finished fourth with 449,895 votes, 0.4% of the popular vote. (Hagelin garnered 0.1% as the Natural Law Party candidate.) In Palm Beach County, Florida, Buchanan received 3,407 votes—which some saw as inconsistent with Palm Beach County's liberal leanings, its large Jewish population and his showing in the rest of the state. Bush spokesman Ari Fleischer stated, "Palm Beach county is a Pat Buchanan stronghold and that's why Pat Buchanan received 3,407 votes there." Reform Party officials strongly disagreed, estimating the number of supporters in the county at between 400 and 500. Appearing on The Today Show, Buchanan said: "When I took one look at that ballot on Election Night ... it's very easy for me to see how someone could have voted for me in the belief they voted for Al Gore". Palm Beach County's butterfly ballot is credited with misdirecting over 2,000 votes from Al Gore to Pat Buchanan, tipping Florida — and the 2000 U.S. presidential election — to George W. Bush.

Some observers said his campaign was aimed at spreading his message beyond his white conservative and populist base, while his views had not changed.

=== Later presidential elections ===
Following the 2000 election, Reform Party members urged Buchanan to take an active role within the party. Buchanan declined, though he did attend their 2001 convention. In the next few years, he identified himself as a political independent, choosing not to align himself with what he viewed as the neo-conservative Republican party leadership. Prior to the 2004 election, Buchanan announced he once again identified himself as a Republican, declared that he had no interest in ever running for president again, and reluctantly endorsed Bush's 2004 reelection, writing: "Bush is right on taxes, judges, sovereignty, and values. Kerry is right on nothing".

Buchanan also endorsed Republican presidential candidate Mitt Romney in 2012, stating in an article that "Obama offers more of the stalemate America has gone through for the past two years" while "Romney alone offers a possibility of hope and change."

Buchanan supported the nomination of Donald Trump, who ran on many of the same positions that Buchanan ran on twenty years prior, as Republican presidential candidate for the 2016 presidential election. Buchanan further supported Trump in 2020 and 2024.

== Later media activities ==
=== MSNBC commentator ===
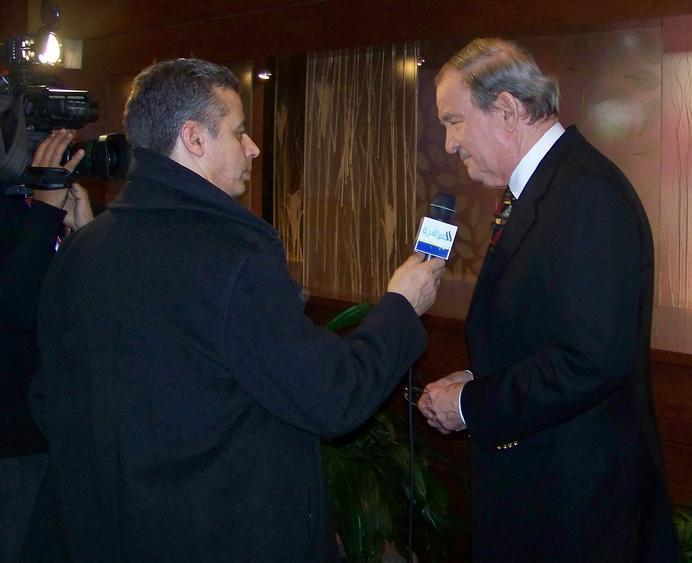
Buchanan being interviewed in 2008

While CNN decided not to take him back following the 2000 election, Buchanan returned to The McLaughlin Group, and his column resumed. A longer variation of the Crossfire format was aired by MSNBC as Buchanan & Press on July 15, 2002, reuniting Buchanan and Press. Billed as "the smartest hour on television", Buchanan and Press featured the duo interviewing guests and sparring about the top news stories. As the Iraq War loomed, Buchanan and Press toned down their rivalry, as they both opposed the invasion. Press claims they were the first cable hosts to discuss the planned attack. MSNBC Editor-in-Chief Jerry Nachman once jokingly lamented this unusual situation:

So the point is why does only Fox [News Channel] get this? At least, we work at the perfect place, the place that's fiercely independent. We try to have balance by putting you two guys together and then this Stockholm syndrome love fest set in between the two of you, and we no longer even have robust debate.

Just hours after his talk show debuted, Buchanan was a guest on the premiere of MSNBC's short-lived Donahue program. Host Phil Donahue and Buchanan debated the separation of church and state. Buchanan called Donahue "dictatorial" and said that the host got his job through affirmative action.

MSNBC President Eric Sorenson canceled Buchanan & Press on November 26, 2003. Buchanan stayed at MSNBC as a political analyst. He regularly appeared on the network's talk shows. He occasionally filled in on the nightly show Scarborough Country during its run on MSNBC. Buchanan also was a frequent guest and co-host of Morning Joe as well as Hardball and The Rachel Maddow Show.

In September 2009, Buchanan wrote an MSNBC opinion column arguing that Adolf Hitler did not want war and the Allied powers' actions were unnecessary. The article was removed from the website after MSNBC was urged to do so in a public statement by the National Jewish Democratic Council. Buchanan had used the occasion of the 70th anniversary of the German invasion of Poland to argue that the United Kingdom should not have declared war on Nazi Germany. This revived charges of antisemitism and helping to legitimize Holocaust denial.

In October 2011, Buchanan was indefinitely suspended from MSNBC as a contributor after the publication of his book Suicide of a Superpower. One of the book's chapters is titled, "The End of White America." The minority advocacy group Color of Change had urged MSNBC to fire him over alleged racial slurs. It was announced on February 16, 2012, that MSNBC's connection with Buchanan had ended.

=== The American Conservative magazine ===
In 2002, Buchanan partnered with former New York Post editorial page editor Scott McConnell and journalist Taki Theodoracopulos to found The American Conservative, a new magazine intended to promote traditional conservative viewpoints on economic, immigration and foreign policies. The first issue was dated October 7, 2002.

=== VDARE ===
From 2006 until his retirement in 2023, Buchanan had been a frequent contributor to VDARE, a far-right website and blog founded by anti-immigration activist and paleo-conservative Peter Brimelow. VDARE is considered a white nationalist news source by the Southern Poverty Law Center.

== Controversies ==
=== Antisemitism ===
In December 1991, a 40,000-word article by William F. Buckley Jr. was published in the National Review discussing antisemitism among conservative commentators focused largely on Buchanan; the article and many responses to it were collected in the book In Search of Anti-Semitism (1992). He wrote: "I find it impossible to defend Pat Buchanan against the charge that what he did and said during the period under examination amounted to anti-Semitism", but concluded: "If you ask, do I think Pat Buchanan is an anti-Semite, my answer is he is not one. But I think he's said some anti-Semitic things."

The Anti-Defamation League has described Buchanan as an "unrepentant bigot" who "repeatedly demonizes Jews and minorities and openly affiliates with white supremacists." In an article for The Washington Post in March 1992, conservative columnist Charles Krauthammer suggested: "The real problem with Buchanan ... is not that his instincts are antisemitic but that they are, in various and distinct ways, fascistic." "There's no doubt," said Krauthammer in 1999 when contacted for a Salon article, "he makes subliminal appeals to prejudice." He added: "The interesting thing is how he can say these things and still be considered a national figure." Buchanan denies assertions that he is an antisemite, and some of his fellow journalists, including Murray Rothbard, Jack Germond, Al Hunt and Mark Shields, have defended him against the charge.

==== Nazi war criminals ====
Around 1982, Buchanan began to defend Cleveland auto-worker John Demjanjuk against the charge that Demjanjuk was a Nazi war criminal nicknamed "Ivan the Terrible" responsible for the mass murder of Jews at Treblinka. In 1986, while he was a senior figure in the Reagan administration, he was highly critical of the charges brought by the Office of Special Investigations (OSI), the Nazi war crimes unit of the Justice Department. He claimed Demjanjuk was the victim of mistaken identity and possibly the victim of a deliberate frame-up by the Soviet Union.

The following year, while still a member of the administration, he made unofficial attempts to stop the deportation of suspected Nazi war criminals from the Eastern Bloc, including Estonian Karl Linnas as well as Demjanjuk. Menachem Z. Rosensaft, in a New York Times op-ed, described Buchanan's "oft-expressed sympathy for a host of Nazi criminals" like Linnas as being "a constitutionally protected perversion." Buchanan referred to such cases as being pursued by "revenge-obsessed Nazi hunters" in 1987. As a member of the Reagan White House, he was accused of having suppressed the Reagan Justice Department's investigation into Nazi scientists brought to America by the OSS's Operation Paperclip.

In 1990, Allan Ryan Jr., a former head of the OSI said Buchanan's accusation of KGB involvement in the Demjanjuk case was "an absolutely cockamamie theory." Ryan accused Buchanan of being "the spokesman for Nazi war criminals in America." Neal Sher, OSI head in 1990 said Buchanan had never contacted them, even when he was a government official. "He essentially took what was fed him by our opponents, sometimes Holocaust-deniers, and just regurgitated it," Sher told The Washington Post. In 1993, however, the Supreme Court of Israel overturned Demjanjuk's war crimes conviction and sentence of death by hanging as a miscarriage of justice based on mistaken identity. Demjanjuk then returned to the United States to fight the revocation of his American citizenship.

Following an elderly Demjanjuk's re-arrest and extradition to the Federal Republic of Germany in 2009, Menachem Z. Rosensaft in The Times of Israel and Jeffrey Goldberg in The Atlantic, objected to an outraged Buchanan again accusing the case of being a frame-up and comparing Demjanjuk to Jesus Christ and calling him an "American Dreyfuss. [sic]" This was alleged by Goldberg as an example of the libel that the Jews as a whole killed Christ. Describing Buchanan's comparison as "strikingly offensive" and an attempt to "revive the charge of blood libel" against Jews, Peter Wehner wrote in Commentary magazine: "Rarely do you find such an obscene mix of blasphemy and bigotry, and all in less than 900 words." Demjanjuk was later convicted of being an accessory to the murder of 28,000 Jewish prisoners at the Sobibor extermination camp. Demjanjuk died in 2012, while the verdict had been overturned and was pending appeal.

==== Bitburg visit by President Reagan ====
Buchanan supported President Reagan's plan to visit a German military cemetery at Bitburg in 1985, where among buried Wehrmacht soldiers were the graves of 48 Waffen SS members. At the insistence of German Chancellor Helmut Kohl and over the vocal objections of Jewish groups, the trip went ahead. In a 1992 interview, Elie Wiesel described attending a White House meeting of Jewish leaders about the trip: "The only one really defending the trip was Pat Buchanan, saying, 'We cannot give the perception of the President being subjected to Jewish pressure.'" Buchanan accused Wiesel of fabricating the story in an ABC interview in 1992: "I didn't say it and Elie Wiesel wasn't even in the meeting ... That meeting was held three weeks before the Bitburg summit was held. If I had said that, it would have been out of there within hours and on the news."

==== Comments on the Holocaust ====
In a 1990 column for the New York Post, Buchanan wrote that it was impossible for 850,000 Jews to be killed by diesel exhaust fed into the gas chamber at Treblinka in a return to his interest in the Demjanjuk case. "Diesel engines do not emit enough carbon monoxide to kill anybody," he wrote. The Washington Post cited experts to the effect that there is more than sufficient carbon monoxide present in the fumes to speedily asphyxiate victims, causing their death. Buchanan once argued Treblinka was not a death camp but a "transit camp" used as a pass-through point for prisoners. In fact, historians have estimated that some 900,000 Jews were murdered at Treblinka. When George Will challenged him on the issue on TV in December 1991, Buchanan did not reply.

==== Comments about Israel ====
In the context of the Gulf War, on August 26, 1990, Buchanan appeared on The McLaughlin Group and said: "there are only two groups that are beating the drums for war in the Middle East – the Israeli defense ministry and its 'amen corner' in the United States." Buchanan on The McLaughlin Group on June 15, 1990, asserted: "Capitol Hill is Israeli occupied territory". He also said in the August 1990 program: "The Israelis want this war desperately because they want the United States to destroy the Iraqi war machine. They want us to finish them off. They don't care about our relations with the Arab world." A. M. Rosenthal, in an article for The New York Times explicitly accused Buchanan of antisemitism on the grounds that he had used the word "Israelis" as a cover for Jews. Abraham Foxman, the director of the ADL, compared Buchanan's comments to insinuations made during the Second World War "that Jews were the only ones who sought American entry in the war against Nazi Germany".

Holocaust survivor Elie Wiesel in September 1990 said Buchanan "leaves the memory of Jewish victims in such disdain; a man who always takes the side of those accused of being killers; a man who is constantly criticizing Israel; a man who always has something nasty to say about the Jewish people".

=== Central Park jogger case ===
In a 1989 column, Buchanan called for the public hanging in Central Park of a 16-year-old Black teenager and the horsewhipping of four other younger African American and Hispanic teenagers for supposedly raping a white jogger in the Central Park Five case. He also called for the civilizing of "barbarians" by putting the "fear of death" in them. Robert C. Smith, professor of political science at San Francisco State University, characterized the column as racist. The five teenagers were convicted, but their charges were later withdrawn, when in 2002 a sociopath said he acted alone and DNA testing affirmed his guilt. All sentences of the Central Park Five were vacated that same year, 13 years after Buchanan called for the public hanging and horsewhipping.

=== On Supreme Court appointments ===
In a 2010 column, Buchanan expressed his disapproval at Barack Obama's nomination of Elena Kagan, to the United States Supreme Court. Pointing out that Democrats had failed to nominate a single black person to the Supreme Court for the last 43 years, Buchanan wrote: "If Kagan is confirmed, Jews, who represent less than 2 percent of the US population, will have 33 percent of the Supreme Court seats. Is this the Democrats' idea of diversity?".

== Personal life ==
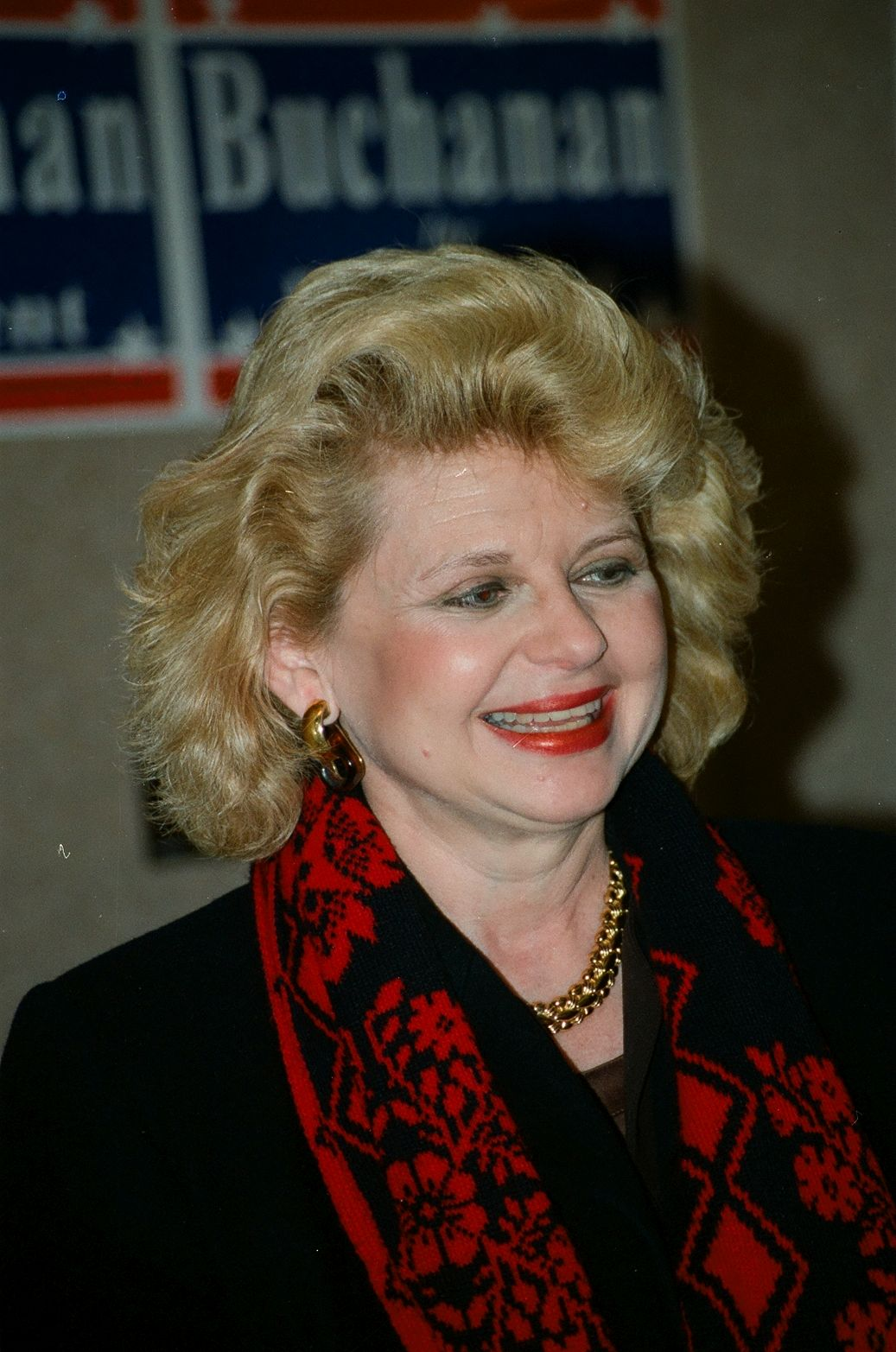
Buchanan's wife Shelley in 1996

Buchanan married White House staffer Shelley Ann Scarney in 1971. They acquired a tabby cat named Gipper, who reportedly would sit on Buchanan's lap during staff meetings. Buchanan identifies as a traditionalist Catholic who attends Mass in the extraordinary form of the Roman Rite, and strongly defended Summorum Pontificum.

Buchanan and his wife have no children.

== Electoral history ==
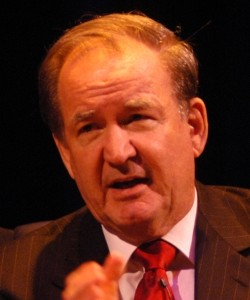
Buchanan in 2004

In 1992, never before having sought elected office, Buchanan challenged incumbent president George H. W. Bush for the Republican Party presidential nomination. Buchanan lost each contest, but received nearly 40 percent of the vote in the New Hampshire primary and ultimately received about 23 percent of the primary vote. He again sought the GOP presidential nomination in 1996, winning three contests and garnering almost 21 percent of the vote; Kansas Senator Bob Dole ultimately won the party's nomination.

Buchanan left the Republican Party in 1999 and joined the Reform Party, founded by two-time independent presidential candidate Ross Perot. He received more than 25 percent of the popular vote in the primary, then secured the nomination at the convention, selecting conservative activist Ezola Foster for his running mate. The Buchanan-Foster ticket received the fourth-most popular votes in the 2000 United States presidential election, though failing to secure any votes in the Electoral College.

=== Presidential primaries (1992) ===
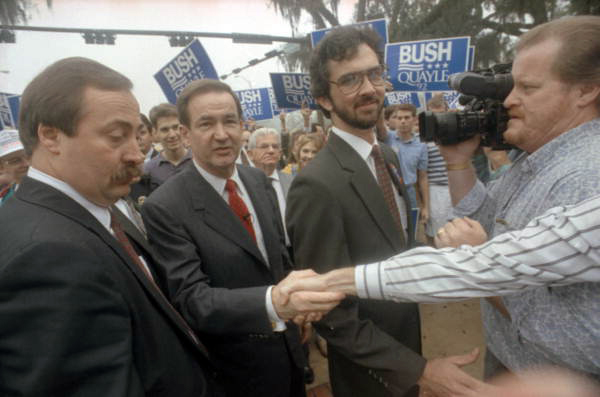
Buchanan, campaigning in Tallahassee, Florida, for the 1992 Republican Party presidential nomination

- George H. W. Bush (inc.) – 9,199,463 (72.84%)
- Pat Buchanan – 2,899,488 (22.96%)
- Unpledged delegates – 287,383 (2.28%)
- David Duke – 119,115 (0.94%)
- Ross Perot – 56,136 (0.44%)
- Pat Paulsen – 10,984 (0.09%)
- Maurice Horton – 9,637 (0.08%)
- Harold Stassen – 8,099 (0.06%)

=== Presidential primaries (1996) ===
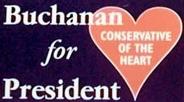
A sticker promoting Buchanan's 1996 primary campaign for president

Gold denotes a state won by Pat Buchanan. Green denotes a state won by Steve Forbes. Purple denotes a state won by Bob Dole. Grey denotes a territory that did not hold a primary.

==== Popular vote ====
- Bob Dole – 9,024,742 (58.82%)
- Pat Buchanan – 3,184,943 (20.76%)
- Steve Forbes – 1,751,187 (11.41%)
- Lamar Alexander – 495,590 (3.23%)
- Alan Keyes – 471,716 (3.08%)
- Richard Lugar – 127,111 (0.83%)
- Unpledged delegates – 123,278 (0.80%)
- Phil Gramm – 71,456 (0.47%)
- Bob Dornan – 42,140 (0.28%)
- Morry Taylor – 21,180 (0.14%)

Won in Alaska, Louisiana, Missouri, and New Hampshire

==== Delegate count ====
- Bob Dole – 1928
- Pat Buchanan – 47
- Steve Forbes – 2
- Alan Keyes – 1
- Robert Bork – 1

=== Presidential primaries (2000) ===
==== Popular vote ====
- Donald Trump – 2,878 (33.39%)
- Pat Buchanan – 2,213 (25.68%)
- Uncommitted – 1,164 (13.51%)
- No preference – 617 (7.16%)
- Charles E. Collins – 535 (6.21%)
- John B. Anderson – 468 (5.43%)
- Robert M. Bowman – 292 (3.39%)
- John Hagelin – 220 (2.55%)
- George Weber – 217 (2.52%)

==== Delegates ====
- Pat Buchanan – 453 (98.69%)
- Abstaining – 6 (1.31%)

=== 2000 United States presidential election ===
Vote percentage received by Pat Buchanan in the 2000 US presidential election by state or territory

- George W. Bush/Dick Cheney (R) – 50,460,110 (47.9) and 271 electoral votes (30 states carried)
- Al Gore/Joe Lieberman (D) – 51,003,926 (48.4%) and 266 electoral votes (20 states and D.C. carried)
- Abstaining – 1 electoral vote (faithless elector from D.C.)
- Ralph Nader/Winona LaDuke (Green) – 2,883,105 (2.7%)
- Pat Buchanan/Ezola B. Foster (Reform) – 449,225 (0.4%)
- Harry Browne/Art Olivier (Libertarian) – 384,516 (0.4%)
- Howard Phillips/Curtis Frazier (Constitution) – 98,022 (0.1%)
- John Hagelin/Nat Goldhaber (Natural Law) – 83,702 (0.1%)

== Publications ==
External videos
- "A Firing Line Debate: Resolved: That the Senate Should Ratify the Proposed Panama Canal Treaties." Firing Line with William F. Buckley, Jr. (January 13, 1978)

=== Books ===
- Buchanan, Patrick J. (1973), The New Majority: President Nixon at Mid-Passage, OCLC 632575.
- Buchanan, Patrick J. (1975), Conservative Votes, Liberal Victories: Why the Right Has Failed, Quadrangle/New York Times Book Company, ISBN 0-8129-0582-2.
- Buchanan, Patrick J. (December 25, 1988), Right from the Beginning, Boston: Little, Brown, ISBN 0-316-11408-1.
- Buchanan, Patrick J. (1998), The Great Betrayal: How American Sovereignty and Social Justice Are Being Sacrificed to the Gods of the Global Economy, Little, Brown, ISBN 0-316-11518-5.
- Buchanan, Patrick J. (1999), A Republic, Not an Empire: Reclaiming America's Destiny, Regnery Pub., ISBN 0-89526-272-X.
- Buchanan, Patrick J. (2002), The Death of the West: How Dying Populations and Immigrant Invasions Imperil Our Country and Civilization, New York USA: St. Martin's Press, ISBN 0-312-28548-5, OCLC 48123033.
- Buchanan, Patrick J. (2004), Where the Right Went Wrong: How Neoconservatives Subverted the Reagan Revolution and Hijacked the Bush Presidency, St. Martin's Press, ISBN 0-312-34115-6.
- Buchanan, Patrick J. (2006). State of Emergency: The Third World Invasion and Conquest of America. New York: Thomas Dunne Books, OCLC 69594056 ISBN 0-312-36003-7. Full text available.
- Buchanan, Patrick J. (November 27, 2007), Day of Reckoning: How Hubris, Ideology, and Greed Are Tearing America Apart, Macmillan, ISBN 978-0-312-37696-3.
- Buchanan, Patrick J. (May 27, 2008), Churchill, Hitler, and The Unnecessary War: How Britain Lost Its Empire and the West Lost the World, New York: Crown, ISBN 978-0-307-40515-9, OCLC 182573642.
- Buchanan, Patrick J. (October 18, 2011), Suicide of a Superpower: Will America Survive to 2025?, St. Martin's Press, ISBN 978-0-312-57997-5.
- Buchanan, Patrick J. (January 1, 2014), The Greatest Comeback: How Richard Nixon Rose from Defeat to Create the New Majority, Crown Forum, ISBN 978-0-553-41863-7.
- Buchanan, Patrick J. (May 9, 2017), Nixon's White House Wars: The Battles That Made and Broke a President and Divided America Forever, Crown Publishing, ISBN 978-1-101-90284-4.

=== Major speeches ===
- 1992 Republican National Convention keynote, August 17, 1992
- The Cultural War for the Soul of America, September 14, 1992
- 1996 campaign announcement, March 20, 1995
- 1996 campaign speech, Georgia primary stump speech February 29, 1996
- Free Trade, Chicago Council on Foreign Relations speech November 18, 1998
- 2000 campaign announcement, March 2, 1999
- A Time for Truth about China, Commonwealth Club speech April 5, 1999
- To Reunite a Nation, Richard Nixon Library speech on immigration January 18, 2000
- 2000 Reform Party nomination acceptance, August 12, 2000
- Death of The West, Commonwealth Club speech January 14, 2002

=== Selected articles ===
- A Lesson in Tyranny Too Soon Forgotten (column), August 25, 1977.
- 'Ivan The Terrible' – More Doubts (column), Real Change, March 17, 1990.
- Ghostbusting the Smoot-Hawley Ogre (column), October 20, 1993.
- Time for Economic Nationalism, June 12, 1995, archived from the original (column) on October 8, 2008.
- "Response to Norman Podhoretz", The Wall Street Journal, November 5, 1999, archived from the original (letter) on May 11, 2008.
- The Sad Suicide of Admiral Nimitz, January 18, 2002, archived from the original (column) on February 12, 2011.
- True Fascists of the New Europe, April 30, 2002, archived from the original (column) on May 18, 2011.
- "Whose War?", American Conservative, March 24, 2003, archived from the original on January 5, 2009.
- "The Death of Manufacturing", American Conservative, August 11, 2003, archived from the original on July 20, 2008.
- "The Death of the West", NBC News (book excerpt), MSN, October 30, 2003.
- The Aggressors in the Culture Wars, March 8, 2004, archived from the original (column) on October 4, 2006.
- What Do We Offer the World?, May 19, 2004, archived from the original (column) on December 28, 2009.
- Where are the Christians?, July 18, 2006, archived from the original (column) on July 25, 2011.
- PJB: A Brief For Whitey, March 21, 2008, archived from the original (column) on August 22, 2008.
- Blowback From Bear Baiting (column), August 15, 2008.
- Several years archives, The American cause, September 2001 – May 2008, archived from the original (newspaper columns) on June 3, 2018.

=== Interviews ===
- Chu, Jefferson 'Jeff' (August 20, 2006), "Ten Questions for Pat Buchanan", Time, archived from the original on September 30, 2007.
- Hannity; Colmes (August 22, 2006), "Pat Buchanan Defends Controversial Immigration Comments" (partial transcript), News, Fox, archived from the original on May 14, 2011.
- Kauffman, William 'Bill' (July–August 1998), "Is This the Face of the Twenty-First Century?", The American Enterprise, archived from the original on January 5, 2006.
- Lamb, Brian (May 17, 1998), "Buchanan on The Great Betrayal", Booknotes, archived from the original (interview) on November 8, 2011.
- Lydon, Christopher (July 7, 2005), "Republicans: Whitman, Buchanan and Terror", Open Source (public radio show audio).
- Slen, Peter. In Depth with Pat Buchanan. C-SPAN, May 2, 2010.
- Pat Buchanan discusses his book State of Emergency, Book TV, August 24, 2006, archived from the original on September 27, 2007.
- Alberta, Tim (April 22, 2017), "The Ideas Made It, But I Didn't", Politico Magazine.

== In popular culture ==
- A fictional version of Buchanan appears in the 2009 film Watchmen, portrayed by James M. Connor.
- Buchanan appears as the final boss of the 1992 video game GayBlade.
- Buchanan was played by Phil Hartman in the Saturday Night Live parodies of The McLaughlin Group. Later during the 1996 campaign Buchanan was portrayed on the show by David Koechner.

== See also ==
- Christian right
- Constitution Party (United States)
- Culture war
- Non-interventionism
- Old Right (United States)
- Paleoconservatism
- Right-wing populism
- Protectionism

Political offices
Preceded by Michael McManus	White House Director of Communications; 1985–1987	Succeeded by Jack Koehler
Party political offices
Preceded by Ross Perot	Reform nominee for President of the United States; 2000	Succeeded by Ralph Nader
