= Unity08 =

Political organization

Unity08 logo

Unity08 was an American political reform movement that sought to offer all voters an opportunity to directly engage in politics by ranking the most crucial issues facing the country, discussing them with the candidates and engaging in an online, secure vote to nominate a bipartisan alternative to the Democratic Party and Republican Party presidential tickets for the 2008 U.S. presidential election. Founded in 2006, the group gained attention from various media outlets, with Newsweek's Jonathan Alter dubbing the group's efforts a kind of open source politics.

In January 2008, Unity08 organizers announced that the group had suspended operations due to funding problems. Americans Elect 2012 is an organization that was formed by many of the individuals that were responsible for Unity 08, and had substantially identical goals for the 2012 presidential election cycle. Americans Elect also failed to nominate a candidate.

== History ==
The political reform movement was founded as a non-profit organization by several political figures: Democrats Hamilton Jordan, Gerald Rafshoon, and Republican consultants Doug Bailey and Jim Jonas and the former two-term independent Maine Governor Angus King. Unity08 attempted to leverage online technology, such as secure voting, to allow American voters to determine the most crucial issues facing the country, discuss them with potential nominees, and participate in an online convention to nominate a bipartisan presidential ticket. In an interview that aired on The NewsHour with Jim Lehrer in May 2006, Unity08's founders said that the group was formed in response to the polarization between the Republican and Democratic political parties. The group also cited a poll it commissioned from Princeton Survey Research and claimed that 82 percent of Americans think that the two major political parties are unable to address the country's problems and that 73 percent of Americans are in favor of alternatives to the two parties.

The group's status as a non-profit organization came into question when they asked the Federal Election Commission whether the group could defer registering as a political action committee until after its candidates for the 2008 presidential election were named. A draft released by the commission in July 2006 concluded that "Unity08 must register as a policy committee and therefore is subject to the reporting requirements and limitations and prohibitions." In October 2006, the commission voted on the matter and declared that the group must register as a political action committee.

However, the decision was appealed to the United States Court of Appeals for the District of Columbia Circuit. On March 2, 2010, the appeals court reversed the lower court and allowed Unity08 (or any entity like it) to operate without having to register with the FEC.

Unity08’s spokesperson was actor Sam Waterston. Waterston discussed the organization on programs such as The O'Reilly Factor and Hardball with Chris Matthews. On June 28, 2007, Doug Bailey, the co-founder of Unity08, appeared on Stephen Colbert's The Colbert Report and spoke about the organization. Shortly after announcing a poll to the "Colbert Nation" about whether Colbert should run for president, the web site servers crashed due to the overwhelming traffic.

=== Suspension of activities ===
In January 2008, Bailey and Rafshoon announced that they were leaving the organization and were planning to launch a national effort to draft New York City Mayor Michael Bloomberg to run for president. Shortly thereafter, representatives for Unity08 announced that the organization was scaling back operations and suspending activities, citing lack of adequate funding and disputes with the Federal Election Commission. Unity08 was unable to resume operations prior to the 2008 presidential election.

== Grassroots presence ==
Prior to the organization's suspension of activities, Unity08's web site was a community for members to communicate and participate via blogs, forums, and polls.

The movement also had a presence on Facebook, MySpace and YouTube.

Unity08 had leveraged the online event tools of Meetup.com and Eventful for members to organize local gatherings.

However, Unity08 was also characterized, by critics, as an example of astroturfing.

== Goals ==
Unity08 had four major goals:

- Enable Americans to rank America’s most crucial issues.
- Empower Americans to draft or evaluate Unity08 candidates and actively engage them in debate about the crucial issues.
- Empower Americans to nominate a bipartisan Unity ticket via an online convention and secure voting process.
- Elect the Unity08 presidential ticket to national office.

The Unity08 presidential ticket was to consist of two candidates that come from different political parties. This bipartisan team was to propose a bipartisan cabinet in an effort to end paralysis in government. Co-founder Doug Bailey explained "What we are trying to do is to create a forum for people who are in the middle who have been left out of politics."

== Speculated candidates ==
Actor and spokesperson Sam Waterston acknowledged in an April 25, 2007, interview on washingtonpost.com's "PostTalk" show that Unity08 would need an appealing candidate at its center to succeed. This was in response to speculation that Unity08 was pursuing New York City Mayor Michael Bloomberg, or Nebraska Senator Chuck Hagel.

Neither Bloomberg nor Hagel chose to run for president. Former Senator Sam Nunn of Georgia, a one-time prospective Unity08 nominee, also chose not to run and instead endorsed Democratic candidate Barack Obama.

== Criticism ==
Campaign watchdog groups such as The Campaign Legal Center and Democracy 21 criticized the group's initial classification as a non-profit organization, "because Unity08 makes clear that its principal purpose is to influence the 2008 presidential election".

The group also came under criticism by political commentators such as David Harsanyi of The Denver Post, who contends that the Unity08 ticket would have served as a "spoiler" for one party's ticket, siphoning off enough votes from one candidate and delivering the election to the other (while failing to win the election itself). Harsanyi points to the third party tickets of Ross Perot in 1992 and Ralph Nader in 2000 that he claims may have delivered those elections to Bill Clinton and George W. Bush, respectively.

Liberal bloggers also expressed frustration with Unity08 because they contend that the group promoted "establishment" centrist or center-right politicians in the molds of Joe Lieberman and Michael Bloomberg while at the same time doing little to promote the progressive values it would seemingly represent. Chris Bowers of the political blog MyDD called the group's supporters "rich, center-right, 'non-partisan' donors who trash progressives and never criticize conservatives in power," and claimed that the movement has no grassroots support. Other bloggers also criticized the heavy representation of lobbyists among the organization's officers.
