= Doug Bailey =

American political consultant (1933–2013)

- Born: October 5, 1933
- Died: June 10, 2013 (aged 79)
- Education: Colgate University; Tufts University
- Occupation: political consultant
- Known for: The Hotline

Doug Bailey (October 5, 1933 - June 10, 2013) was an American political consultant and founder of The Hotline, a bipartisan, daily briefing on American politics.

== Life ==
Douglas Lansford Bailey was born on Oct. 5, 1933, in Cleveland. After receiving a bachelor's degree from Colgate University in 1954, Mr. Bailey received his master's and doctorate degrees in 1957-1962 from The Fletcher School of Law and Diplomacy at Tufts.

From 1968 to 1987, Bailey was President of Bailey Deardourff and Associates, among the first national political consulting firms.

He worked for Republican candidates for Governor, Senate and president including: President Gerald Ford; senators Edward Brooke, Kit Bond, John Danforth, Charles Percy, Richard Schweiker, John Chafee, Richard Lugar, Robert Stafford, Howard Baker; governors Thomas Kean, William Milliken, Jim Rhodes, Otis R. Bowen, James R. Thompson, Lamar Alexander, Richard Snelling, William T. Cahill, Richard Thornburgh, Jim Rhodes, Robert Ray, Al Quie, Pete DuPont.

He started The Hotline, a daily political newsletter delivered by fax, in 1987. It began partly as an experiment in bipartisanship. Each issue, faxed in the late morning, included a roundup of political jokes from the previous night's talk-show monologues. He sold it to the National Journal in 1996.

== Philanthropy ==
After he left day-to-day operations, Bailey was involved in numerous philanthropic activities. Most recently, he was one of the four co-founders of the political reform movement Unity08. He was seeking to start a new centrist party for the 2008 presidential election to try to unite the country. He appeared on The Colbert Report to promote his cause. He founded Freedom's Answer, a non-partisan voter turnout effort, with former Clinton Press Secretary Mike McCurry. He also served on the board of directors of the Fletcher School at Tufts University.

In 1994, Bailey joined Jeffrey Pollack in a venture to start a daily briefing for the sports world called the Sports Business Daily. This venture originally occupied three rooms in the same building as The Hotline, and was sold in 1996.

In January 2008, Bailey and fellow Unity08 co-founder Gerald Rafshoon left that organization to launch a national effort to draft New York City Mayor Michael Bloomberg to run for president as an independent candidate.

Bailey sat on the Council on American Politics, which brings leaders from the political and communications arenas together to address issues facing the growth and enrichment of GW's Graduate School of Political Management.

Bailey died on June 10, 2013.

== Family ==
He was married to Patricia P. Bailey, who was a FTC commissioner from 1979 to 1988; they had two children.
