= Sedler =

Sedler is a surname. Notable people with the surname include:

- Eric Sedler (born 1968), American businessman, son of Robert
- Robert Sedler (1935–2025), American law professor and attorney
