= Pete Rouse =

American political consultant

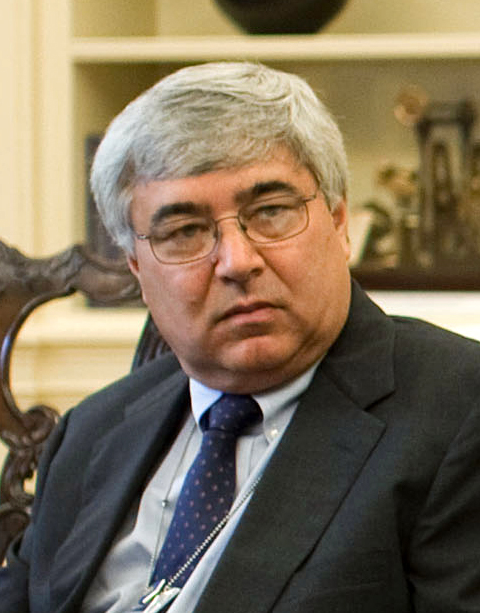
- Rouse in 2009

Counselor to the President
- In office January 13, 2011 – January 1, 2014
- President: Barack Obama
- Preceded by: Ed Gillespie
- Succeeded by: John Podesta

Acting White House Chief of Staff
- In office October 1, 2010 – January 13, 2011
- President: Barack Obama
- Preceded by: Rahm Emanuel
- Succeeded by: Bill Daley

Senior Advisor to the President
- In office January 20, 2009 – October 1, 2010
- President: Barack Obama
- Preceded by: Barry Jackson
- Succeeded by: Brian Deese

Personal details
- Born: Peter Mikami Rouse; April 15, 1946 (age 80) New Haven, Connecticut, U.S.
- Party: Democratic
- Education: Colby College (BA); London School of Economics (MA); Harvard University (MPA)

Peter Mikami Rouse (Japanese surname: 三上, born April 15, 1946) is an American political consultant who served as interim White House Chief of Staff to U.S. President Barack Obama. Rouse previously spent many years on Capitol Hill, becoming known as the "101st senator" during his tenure as Chief of Staff to Senate Democratic leader Tom Daschle.

When Daschle lost his seat in 2004, Rouse was persuaded to stay in Congress as Chief of Staff to then-freshman Senator Barack Obama. Rouse followed Obama to the White House as a senior advisor in 2008 and became interim Chief of Staff there for several months following the departure of Rahm Emanuel in October 2010, and subsequent appointment of William M. Daley the following January. Rouse remained with the White House until late 2013 as Counselor to the President.

== Early life ==
Rouse was born in New Haven, Connecticut, the son of Mary Uta (née Mikami) and Irving Rouse. His father was of English and some Bohemian (Czech) descent, and his mother was of Japanese ancestry (Rouse is a sansei (third generation)). Rouse's mother grew up as a child only speaking Japanese. Rouse's maternal grandfather emigrated from Tokyo to San Francisco in 1885. He returned to Japan in 1910 to marry his wife, before they then moved back to the U.S., eventually settling in Alaska in 1915. The Mikamis retired to Los Angeles shortly before World War II began. They were later sent to an internment camp in Arizona during the War.

Rouse received a B.A. from Colby College in 1968, an M.A. from the London School of Economics in 1970, and an M.P.A. from the John F. Kennedy School of Government at Harvard University in 1977.

== Career ==
Overall, Rouse worked on Capitol Hill for more than 40 years, since 1971. According to Amy Sullivan of Washington Monthly Rouse came to be known as "the 101st Senator" thanks to his knowledge and skills.

=== With Daschle ===
Rouse had worked since 1985 for Daschle, whom he met as a fellow legislative assistant for Senator James Abourezk (D-SD).

On October 15, 2001, Rouse was the Daschle staff member to call the police about a letter that contained anthrax powder. Twenty of Daschle's staff subsequently tested positive for exposure to anthrax spores; it is not known if Rouse was exposed along with his workmates.

=== With Obama in Senate ===
Rouse had been chief of staff to South Dakota Senator Tom Daschle, the former majority leader, and was planning to retire after Daschle lost in 2004. However, in 2004, Rouse was contacted by a law school friend of then-Illinois Senator Obama and chose to work for him as his chief of staff.

Rouse helped prepare a memo, "The Strategic Plan," for Obama's first year in the Senate. Helping Obama navigate Senate politics, Rouse worked with Obama and Senator Russ Feingold (D-WI) on strengthening ethics reform legislation. Similarly, he suggested that Obama speak with Senators Ted Kennedy and Joe Lieberman in the early stages of exploring his presidential candidacy. Rouse also is credited with persuading Obama to vote against the nomination of John G. Roberts, who was nevertheless confirmed and is now Chief Justice of the United States (Bacon 2007).

As with all congressional staff, Rouse's compensation is public information. He has received salary payments above $140,000 during his years with Senator Obama.

As the Obama Presidential Campaign picked up, Rouse was named Chief of Staff of Obama for America. After Obama's victory, Rouse became Co-Chair of the Obama-Biden Transition Project.

=== Role as Senior Advisor ===
During the first two years of the Obama Presidency, Rouse was one of three White House officials with the title Senior Adviser to the President, along with David Axelrod and Valerie Jarrett. In an interview, Rouse said that he "basically does the inside, organizational stuff and strategic stuff internally," adding that he had no desire to be the "outside person" but preferred to leave external relations to Axelrod, Jarrett and Chief of Staff Rahm Emanuel. Rouse said the Deputy Chiefs of Staff, Jim Messina and Mona Sutphen, "who run the place from day to day," report to him. Asked about his overall portfolio, he said "I fix things." He described himself as one of several problem fixers in a collaborative environment.

The Rolling Stone described Rouse as a low profile, calm and legislatively connected manager, quoting one "top Democratic strategist" as saying that "Rouse's the one who brought 'no drama' to Obama. His enforcement makes it work."

In September 2009, the Washington Post reported that Rouse was heading the White House's efforts to close the Guantanamo Bay prison.

=== White House Chief of Staff ===
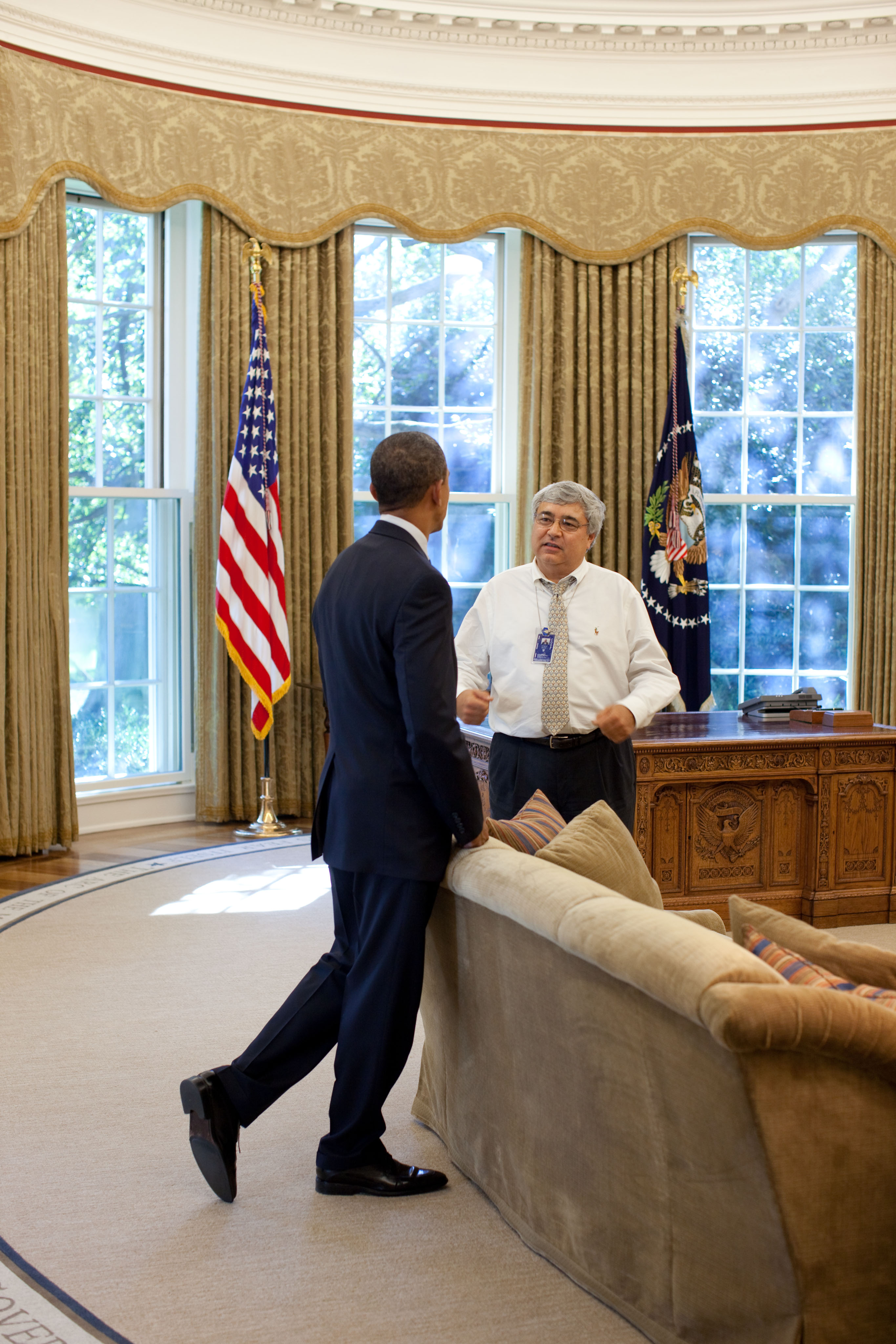
Rouse speaking with President Obama in the Oval Office in October 2010, shortly after becoming Chief of Staff.

When Rahm Emanuel left the White House in October 2010 to run for Mayor of Chicago, Rouse became the "interim" Chief of Staff at the White House. Rouse is the first Asian American Chief of Staff in U.S. history.

=== Counselor to the President ===
On January 6, 2011, it was announced that William M. Daley would succeed Rouse as permanent Chief of Staff. Rouse was promoted to the role of Counselor to the President and remained with the White House through the end of 2013.

=== Post White House ===
After leaving the White House, Rouse went to work for the law firm Perkins Coie, where he advises clients on navigating the federal government.

== Personal life ==
Rouse was born and raised in Connecticut. He has an interest in Maine Coon cats.

Political offices
Preceded by Barry Jackson	Senior Advisor to the President; 2009–2010	Succeeded by David Plouffe
Preceded by Rahm Emanuel	White House Chief of Staff; Acting; 2010–2011	Succeeded by Bill Daley
Vacant Title last held by Ed Gillespie	Counselor to the President; 2011–2014	Succeeded by John Podesta
