= AKPD Message and Media =

American political consulting firm

AKPD Message and Media is an American political and media consulting firm catering to Democratic candidates and related causes. Formerly Axelrod and Associates, it is named after its four original partners: David Axelrod, John Kupper, David Plouffe, and John Del Cecato.

All four partners were staff members on Barack Obama's 2008 presidential campaign, with Plouffe serving as campaign manager, Axelrod as senior strategist, and Del Cecato as media advisor. Axelrod, who is personally close to Obama, left AKPD to serve as senior advisor to the president in the Obama administration and sold the firm to Kupper, Del Cecato and Larry Grisolano.

AKPD's advertising and strategy have been widely credited for significantly altering elections in their clients favor. Time praised one of their most talked-about ads, "Dante", as "The Ad that Won the New York Mayor's Race" for Bill de Blasio.

AKPD's offices are located in Chicago, Washington DC, and New York where it has recently expanded its presence by partnering with Bully Pulpit Interactive and Analytics Media Group. According to OpenSecrets, AKPD was the 37th-ranked campaign vendor of the 2018 election cycle, receiving nearly $23.3 million from federal campaigns and political committees.

== Notable clients ==
- Barack Obama during the 2008 United States presidential election and the 2012 United States presidential election
- Bill de Blasio during the 2013 New York City mayoral election
- Rahm Emanuel during the 2011 Chicago mayoral election
- Deval Patrick during the 2010 Massachusetts gubernatorial election
- John Edwards during the John Edwards 2004 presidential campaign
- Herb Kohl during the 2006 United States Senate election in Wisconsin
- Yulia Tymoshenko during the 2010 Ukrainian presidential election
- Francisco de Narváez and Republican Proposal during the 2009 Argentine legislative election
- Paul M. Simon during the 1988 Democratic Party presidential primaries

== See also ==
- Organizing for America
- Obama for America
- Buffy Wicks
