= Myril Axelrod Bennett =

American executive

- Born: Myril Jessica Davidson; April 4, 1920; Weehawken, New Jersey, US
- Died: January 21, 2014 (aged 93); Newton, Massachusetts, US
- Education: New York University (BA)
- Spouses: Joseph Axelrod (m. 1943; div. 1968) Abner Bennett (m. 1970–1986)
- Children: 2, including David

Myril Axelrod Bennett (born Myril Jessica Davidson; April 4, 1920 – January 21, 2014) was an American journalist and advertising executive. She was one of the first female executives in the advertising industry.

== Biography ==
She was born Myril Jessica Davidson on April 4, 1920, in Weehawken, New Jersey, United States, and was raised in a Jewish family in Jersey City. Her father was a dentist who had fled the pogroms of Russia, and her mother was the daughter of immigrants. Taking inspiration from her elder brother Bill, she followed his lead and graduated from New York University's journalism program, where she edited the student newspaper. After school, during World War II, she wrote mental health survey reports for her husband, who was in the U.S. Army.

After the war, the couple moved to Stuyvesant Town, where she worked at the left-leaning, ad-free daily newspaper PM working under then-journalist Albert Deutsch and I.F. Stone and later at the newspaper's successor, the New York Star. After both papers folded, she wrote free-lance articles before switching to another male-dominated field, advertising. In 1958, she took a job with Compton Advertising and then moved to Young & Rubicam in 1966 where she served as a vice president. She had a successful career focusing on pitching the qualitative and emotional message in advertisements. She retired in the 1980s although she continued to conduct research for the senior housing industry.

She continued to write (as Myril Axelrod) until her death, serving as a guest columnist for Boston.com's Your Town series.

== Personal life ==
In 1943, she married Joseph Axelrod who worked as a psychologist in the U.S. Army; they had two children, Joan Axelrod Lehrich, and David Axelrod, before divorcing in 1968 (Joseph later died in 1974). In 1970, she married marketing executive Abner Bennett; he died in 1986.

Bennett died on January 21, 2014, of heart failure in her home in Newton, Massachusetts. She was buried at the United Jewish Center Cemetery in Brookfield Center, Connecticut.
