= David Axelrod =

American political consultant (born 1955)

- Axelrod at the University of Chicago in 2026

Senior Advisor to the President
- In office January 20, 2009 – January 10, 2011
- President: Barack Obama
- Preceded by: Barry Jackson
- Succeeded by: David Plouffe

Personal details
- Born: February 22, 1955 (age 71) New York City, U.S.
- Party: Democratic
- Spouse: Susan Landau (m. 1979)
- Children: 3
- Parent: Myril Axelrod Bennett (mother)
- Education: University of Chicago (BA)

David M. Axelrod (born February 22, 1955) is an American political consultant and analyst. A member of the Democratic Party, he was the chief strategist to Barack Obama during his 2008 and 2012 presidential campaigns. In addition, during Obama's first term, Axelrod worked in the White House as the senior advisor to the president.

Axelrod, from New York City, started his career as a political reporter for the Chicago Tribune. He subsequently helped lead Paul Simon's successful 1984 bid for the U.S. Senate in Illinois. Forming a political consultancy firm, Axelrod built a reputation as a sought-after Democratic strategist, especially in Illinois. His clients included Chicago Mayors Harold Washington and Richard M. Daley to whom he served as a longtime advisor. Axelrod expanded his national profile advising John Edwards during his 2004 presidential campaign and Rahm Emanuel for the 2006 midterms.

During the 2008 presidential election, Axelrod worked as the chief strategist to Barack Obama, whom he had first met in the early 1990s. After Obama's election, Axelrod was appointed as Senior Advisor to the President. He left the position in early 2011 to become the Senior Strategist for Obama's successful re-election campaign in 2012. After the campaign, Axelrod retired from consulting and served as the director of the University of Chicago Institute of Politics from 2012 until 2023. He has also been a Senior Political Commentator on CNN since 2015.

== Early life ==
David Axelrod was born on the Lower East Side of Manhattan, New York and grew up in its Stuyvesant Town area. He is from a liberal Jewish family and had his bar mitzvah at the Brotherhood Synagogue in Manhattan. His mother, Myril Bennett (née Davidson), was a journalist at PM, a liberal-leaning 1940s newspaper, and later an advertising executive at Young & Rubicam. His father, Joseph Axelrod, was a psychologist and avid baseball fan, who emigrated from Eastern Europe to the United States at 11. David attended Public School 40 in Manhattan. His parents separated when he was eight years old. In 2021, Axelrod disclosed in a CNN op-ed that his father suffered from severe clinical depression, unbeknownst at the time to the family, which led to his suicide when the younger Axelrod was 19.

Describing the appeal of politics, David Axelrod told the Los Angeles Times, "I got into politics because I believe in idealism. Just to be a part of this effort that seems to be rekindling the kind of idealism that I knew when I was a kid, it's a great thing to do. So I find myself getting very emotional about it." At 13, he sold campaign buttons for Robert F. Kennedy. After graduating from Stuyvesant High School in Manhattan in 1972, Axelrod attended the University of Chicago, where he majored in political science. Axelrod described his childhood as "very turbulent", although he did not specify the exact details that elicited this characterization. As an undergraduate, Axelrod wrote for the Hyde Park Herald, covering politics, and earned an internship at the Chicago Tribune.

== Personal life ==
Axelrod lost his father to suicide in 1977 around the time of his college graduation. While at the University of Chicago, he met his future wife, business student Susan Landau (daughter of physician-scientist Richard L. Landau) and they married in 1979.

They have three children. In June 1981, their first child, a daughter, was born. She was diagnosed with epilepsy at seven months of age. Axelrod describes Lauren as having had brutal seizures, requiring a constantly changing regimen of medications for some time. This left her developmentally disabled, but nevertheless mainstreamed in school. For a few years after high school, the family struggled to find programs that would keep her happy and fulfilled, but were able to place her in Misericordia, a large dormitory-style group home in 2002. As of 2021, Axelrod advocates for a flexible, mixed approach to group homes that support environments for people like his daughter, in contrast to the common approach of exclusively moving toward smaller group homes.

== Career ==
=== Prior to first Obama campaign ===
The Chicago Tribune hired Axelrod after his graduation from college. He worked there for eight years, covering national, state and local politics, becoming their youngest political writer in 1981. At 27, he became the city hall bureau chief and a political columnist for the paper. He left the Tribune and joined the campaign of U.S. senator Paul Simon as communications director in 1984. Within weeks he was promoted to co-campaign manager.

In 1985, Axelrod formed the political consultancy firm, Axelrod & Associates. During the 1986 Illinois gubernatorial election, he was hired by the campaign of then-attorney general Neil Hartigan, but switched to work for former senator Adlai Stevenson III when he entered the Democratic primary. In 1987 he worked on the successful reelection campaign of Harold Washington, Chicago's first black mayor, while spearheading Simon's campaign for the 1988 Democratic presidential nomination. This established his experience in working with black politicians; he later became a key player in similar mayoral campaigns of black candidates, including Dennis Archer in Detroit, Michael R. White in Cleveland, Anthony A. Williams in Washington, D.C., Lee P. Brown in Houston, and John F. Street in Philadelphia. Axelrod is a longtime strategist for the former Chicago mayor Richard M. Daley and styles himself a "specialist in urban politics." The Economist notes he also specializes in "packaging black candidates for white voters".

In January 1990, Axelrod was hired to be the media consultant for the all but official re-election campaign of Oregon Governor Neil Goldschmidt. However, in February Goldschmidt decided not to seek re-election. Axelrod was retained by the Liberal Party of Ontario to help Dalton McGuinty and his party in 2002 to be elected into government in the October 2003 election. Axelrod's effect on Ontario was heard through the winning Liberal appeal to "working families" and placing an emphasis on positive policy contrasts like canceling corporate tax breaks to fund education and health.

In 2004, Axelrod worked for John Edwards' presidential campaign. He lost responsibility for making ads, but continued as the campaign's spokesman. Regarding Edwards' failed 2004 presidential campaign, Axelrod has commented, "I have a whole lot of respect for John, but at some point the candidate has to close the deal and—I can't tell you why—that never happened with John." Axelrod worked as a consultant for Exelon, a Chicago utility which operated the largest fleet of nuclear reactors in the United States.

Axelrod contributed an op-ed to the Chicago Tribune in defense of patronage politics after two top officials in the administration of longtime client Chicago mayor Richard M. Daley were arrested for what federal prosecutors described as "pervasive fraud" in City Hall hiring and promotions. In 2006, he consulted for several campaigns, including the successful campaigns of Eliot Spitzer in New York's gubernatorial election and Deval Patrick in Massachusetts's gubernatorial election. Also in 2006, Axelrod served as the chief political adviser for Democratic Congressional Campaign Committee chair U.S. Representative Rahm Emanuel for the U.S. House of Representatives elections, in which the Democrats gained 31 seats.

He was an adjunct professor of communication studies at Northwestern University in Evanston, Illinois, where with Professor Peter Miller, he taught an undergraduate class titled Campaign Strategy, analyzing political campaigns, and their strategies. On June 14, 2009, he received an honorary Doctor of Humane Letters degree from DePaul University, speaking at the commencement exercises of the College of Communication and College of Computing and Digital Media.

=== Barack Obama presidential campaign, 2008 ===
Axelrod first met Obama in 1992, when Bettylu Saltzman, a Chicago Democrat, introduced the two of them after Obama had impressed her at a black voter registration drive that he ran. Obama consulted Axelrod before he delivered a 2002 anti-war speech, and asked him to read drafts of his book The Audacity of Hope.

Axelrod contemplated taking a break from politics during the 2008 presidential campaign, as five of the candidates—Barack Obama, Hillary Clinton, John Edwards, Chris Dodd and Tom Vilsack—were past clients. Personal ties between Axelrod and Hillary Clinton made it difficult, as she had raised significant funds for epilepsy on behalf of a foundation co-founded by Axelrod's wife and mother, Citizens United for Research in Epilepsy (CURE). (Axelrod's daughter has developmental disabilities associated with chronic epileptic seizures.) Axelrod's wife even said that a 1999 conference Clinton convened to find a cure for the condition was "one of the most important things anyone has done for epilepsy." Axelrod ultimately decided to participate in the Obama campaign, and served as chief strategist and media advisor for Obama. He told The Washington Post, "I thought that if I could help Barack Obama get to Washington, then I would have accomplished something great in my life." Axelrod contributed to the start of Obama's campaign by creating a five-minute Internet video released January 16, 2007. He continued to use "man on the street"-style biographical videos to create a sense of intimacy and authenticity in the political ads.

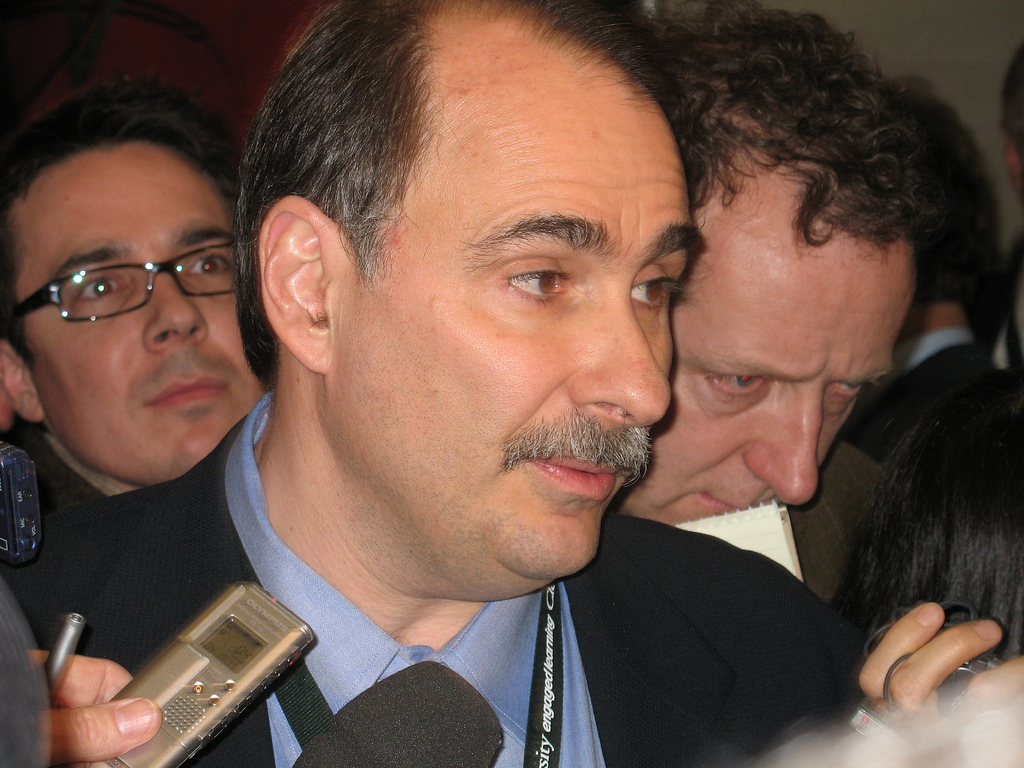
Axelrod talking to reporters in the "spin room" after the Cleveland Democratic debate in February 2008

While the Clinton campaign chose a strategy that emphasized experience, Axelrod helped to craft the Obama campaign's main theme of "change." He was critical of the Clinton campaign's positioning, and said that "being the consummate Washington insider is not where you want to be in a year when people want change...[Clinton's] initial strategic positioning was wrong and kind of played into our hands." The change message played a factor in Obama's victory in the Iowa caucuses. "Just over half of [Iowa's] Democratic caucus-goers said change was the No. 1 factor they were looking for in a candidate, and 51 percent of those voters chose Barack Obama," said CNN senior political analyst Bill Schneider. "That compares to only 19 percent of 'change' caucus-goers who preferred Clinton." Axelrod also believed that the Clinton campaign underestimated the importance of the caucus states. "For all the talent and the money they had over there," says Axelrod, "they—bewilderingly—seemed to have little understanding for the caucuses and how important they would become." In the 2008 primary season, Obama won a majority of the states that use the caucus format.

Axelrod is credited with implementing a strategy encouraging people to participate, a lesson drawn partly from Howard Dean's 2004 presidential campaign as well as a personal goal of Barack Obama. Axelrod explained to Rolling Stone, "When we started this race, Barack told us that he wanted the campaign to be a vehicle for involving people and giving them a stake in the kind of organizing he believed in". According to Axelrod, getting volunteers involved became the legacy of the campaign. This includes drawing on "Web 2.0" technology and viral media to support a grassroots strategy. Obama's web platform allows supporters to blog, create their own personal page, and even phonebank from home. Axelrod's elaborate use of the Internet helped Obama to organize under-30 voters and build over 475,000 donors in 2007, most of whom were Internet donors contributing less than $100 each. The Obama strategy stood in contrast to Hillary Clinton's campaign, which benefited from high name recognition, large donors and strong support among established Democratic leaders.

Politico described Axelrod as 'soft-spoken' and 'mild-mannered' and it quoted one Obama aide in Chicago as saying, "Do you know how lucky we are that he is our Mark Penn?" Democratic consultant and former colleague Dan Fee said of Axelrod, "He's a calming presence." "He's not a screamer, like some of these guys," political advisor Bill Daley said of Axelrod in the Chicago Tribune. "He has a good sense of humor, so he's able to defuse things." In June 2008, The New York Times described Axelrod as a "campaign guru" with an "appreciation for Chicago-style politics."

=== Senior Advisor to the President, 2009–11 ===
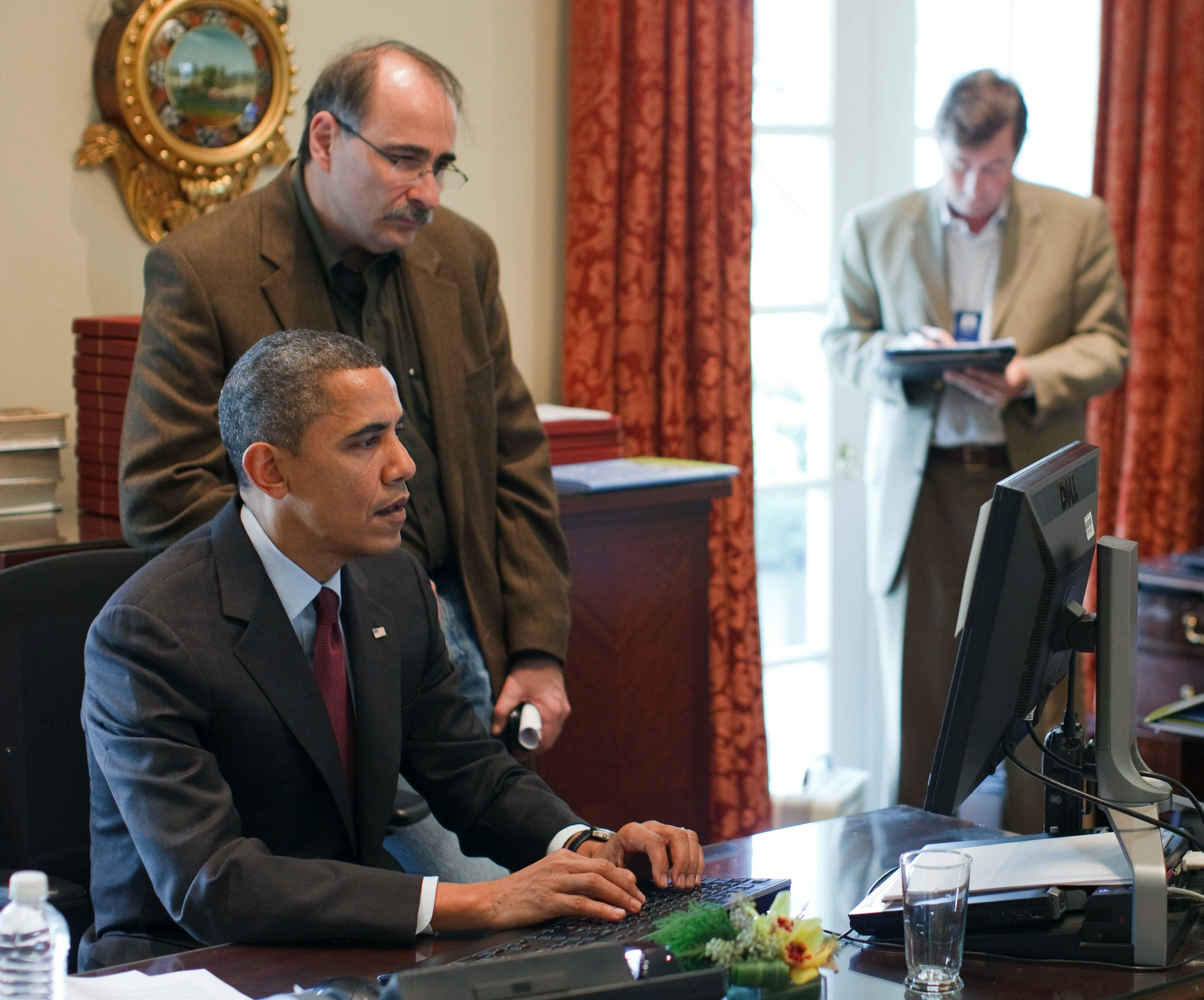
Axelrod with President Barack Obama and speechwriter Terry Szuplat at the White House, December 2010

On November 20, 2008, Obama named Axelrod as a senior advisor to his administration. His role included crafting policy and communicating the President's message in coordination with President Obama, the Obama administration, speechwriters, and the White House communications team.

==== Foreclosure scandal ====
When details of the 2010 United States foreclosure crisis were publicized in 2010, notably robo-signing, Axelrod was widely criticized for downplaying the magnitude of the crisis in his comments to the press, telling the audience of CBS News' Face the Nation that the Obama administration's "hope is this moves rapidly and that this gets unwound very, very quickly" and that he's "not sure that a national moratorium" is called for since "there are in fact valid foreclosures that probably should go forward." Notably, Axelrod made this statement after several banks had voluntarily suspended foreclosures and evictions in order to investigate improprieties.

=== Barack Obama presidential campaign, 2012 ===
Axelrod left his White House senior advisor post on January 28, 2011. He was a top aide to Obama's 2012 re-election campaign. He said that his job as Obama's chief campaign strategist in the 2012 campaign would be his final job as a political operative.

=== After second Obama campaign ===
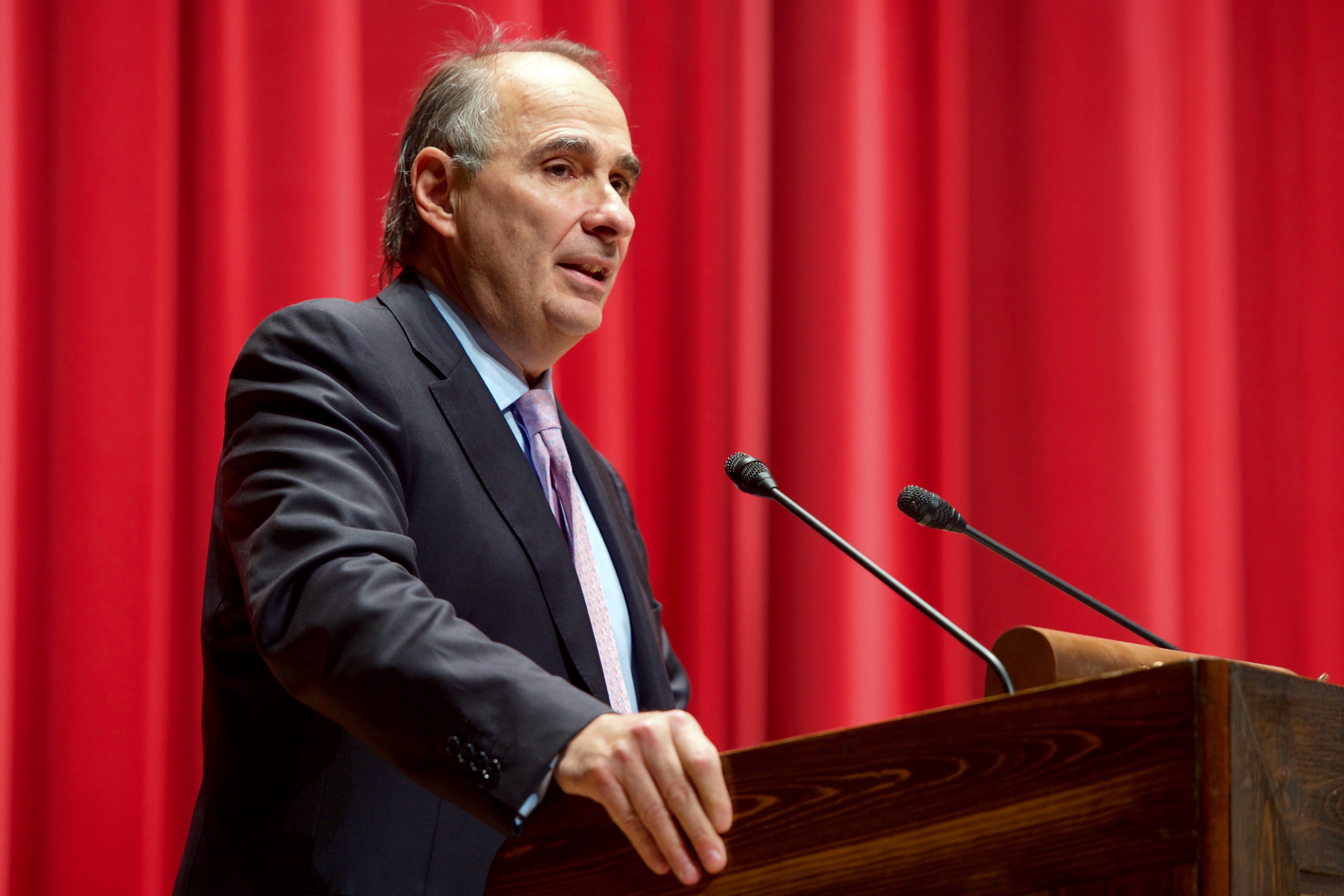
Axelrod at the University of Chicago, October 2016

In January 2013, Axelrod established a bipartisan Institute of Politics at the University of Chicago, where he serves as director. On January 23, 2013, La Stampa reported that he was helping Italian prime minister Mario Monti with his election campaign and had flown to Italy to meet with Monti on January 13. Monti's coalition finished in fourth place with 10.5% of the vote in the Italian general election, 2013. On February 19, 2013, Axelrod joined NBC News and MSNBC as a senior political analyst, a position he held until September 2015 when he moved to CNN. In 2014 Axelrod was appointed senior strategic adviser to the British Labour Party to assist party leader Ed Miliband in the run-up to the 2015 general election.

He is the co-founder of AKPD Message and Media, along with Eric Sedler, and operated ASK Public Strategies, now called ASGK Public Strategies, which were sold in 2009. In February 2015 Axelrod's book Believer: My Forty Years in Politics was published. In 2015, Axelrod began hosting a podcast titled The Axe Files a series of in-depth discussions and interviews with various political figures. In June 2019 he started the podcast Hacks on Tap with co-host Mike Murphy, a show where the two discuss news and updates from the 2020 presidential campaign trail. He also joined CNN as a senior political commentator in September 2015.

In 2018, Axelrod vocally opposed Democratic support for impeachment, arguing that if "we “normalize” impeachment as a political tool, it will be another hammer blow to our democracy". In 2022, he announced his intention to retire as director of the University of Chicago Institute of Politics, and become a senior fellow and chair of its advisory board, effective January 2023. UChicago president Paul Alivisatos said of his tenure that "David’s leadership of the IOP has driven its incredible growth and success over the past decade."

Political offices
Preceded by Barry Jackson	Senior Advisor to the President; 2009–2011; Served alongside: Valerie Jarrett, Pete Rouse	Succeeded by David Plouffe
