= Barry Steven Jackson =

American presidential advisor

Barry Jackson
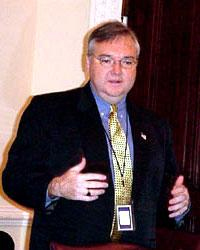

Chief of Staff to the Speaker of the House
- In office January 11, 2011 – June 7, 2012
- Leader: John Boehner
- Preceded by: Terri McCullough
- Succeeded by: Mike Sommers

Senior Advisor to the President
- In office September 1, 2007 – January 20, 2009
- President: George W. Bush
- Preceded by: Karl Rove
- Succeeded by: David Axelrod; Valerie Jarrett; Pete Rouse

Personal details
- Born: October 18, 1960 (age 66) Washington D.C., U.S.
- Party: Republican
- Education: University of Iowa (BA)

Barry Steven Jackson (born October 18, 1960) is an American political operative who served as Chief of Staff to U.S. House Speaker John Boehner and 2011 to 2012, and previously from 1991 to 2001, following Boehner's election to the House of Representatives. He also served as Senior Advisor to the President for George W. Bush.

== Personal ==
Barry Jackson was born in Washington, D.C., but grew up mostly in Ohio. He graduated from the University of Iowa in 1983 with a bachelor's degree from the School of Journalism and Mass Communications.

His father is Cletis M. Jackson of Lebanon, Ohio, currently President and CEO of Hi-Tek Manufacturing, Inc. in Mason, Ohio, a producer of machine components.

== Career ==
=== Early ===
In 1988, Jackson joined with his father in incorporating a now-inactive company, Regal Flush Manufacturing, Inc.

=== Washington ===
From 1991 until his initial appointment to the Bush White House, Jackson was chief of staff to Congressman John Boehner of Ohio. He returned to this position in January 2010 after the death of Boehner's previous chief of staff, Paula Nowakowski.

=== White House ===
Jackson began his White House career in 2001, serving as a deputy to Karl Rove. He continued in that role until Rove's resignation in 2007.

=== Speaker of the House roles ===
In June 2012, Jackson was removed as Chief of Staff and installed as Advisor to the Speaker of the House.

== Controversies ==
=== Abramoff ===
In the Abramoff scandal, Jackson has been cited as a regular participant in lobbying contacts with Jack Abramoff and his staffers.

=== Politicization ===
Jackson's role in the politicization of government under the administration of George W. Bush has been discussed in hearings on Capitol Hill. Jackson has been pointed to as someone who gave advice to Drew DeBerry, a White House liaison in the Agriculture Department, regarding travel for political purposes. Jackson's role in giving presentations on political matters was also discussed in hearings.

Political offices
Preceded by Karl Rove	Senior Advisor to the President; 2007–2009	Succeeded by David Axelrod; Valerie Jarrett; Pete Rouse
