= Karl Rove =

American political consultant and policy advisor (born 1950)

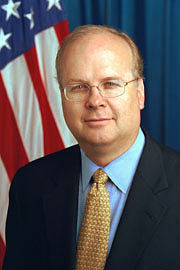

White House Deputy Chief of Staff for Policy
- In office February 8, 2005 – August 31, 2007
- President: George W. Bush
- Preceded by: Harriet Miers
- Succeeded by: Joel Kaplan

Senior Advisor to the President
- In office January 20, 2001 – August 31, 2007
- President: George W. Bush
- Preceded by: Sidney Blumenthal; Joel Johnson; Doug Sosnik
- Succeeded by: Barry Jackson

Chair of the College Republicans
- In office 1973–1977
- Preceded by: Joe Abate
- Succeeded by: John Brady

Personal details
- Born: Karl Christian Rove; December 25, 1950 (age 75) Denver, Colorado, U.S.
- Party: Republican
- Spouses: Valerie Mather Wainwright (m. 1976; div. 1980); Darby Hickson (m. 1986; div. 2009); Karen Johnson (m. 2012)
- Children: 1
- Education: University of Utah (attended); George Mason University (attended)

Karl Christian Rove (born December 25, 1950) is an American Republican political consultant, policy advisor, and lobbyist. He was Senior Advisor and Deputy Chief of Staff during the George W. Bush administration until his resignation on August 31, 2007. He has also headed the Office of Political Affairs, the Office of Public Liaison, and the White House Office of Strategic Initiatives. Rove was one of the architects of the Iraq War.

Prior to his White House appointments, he is credited with the 1994 and 1998 Texas gubernatorial victories of George W. Bush, as well as Bush's 2000 and 2004 successful presidential campaigns. In his 2004 victory speech, Bush referred to Rove as "the Architect". Rove has also been credited for the successful campaigns of John Ashcroft (1994 U.S. Senate election), Bill Clements (1986 Texas gubernatorial election), Senator John Cornyn (2002 U.S. Senate election), Governor Rick Perry (1990 Texas Agriculture Commission election), and Phil Gramm (1982 U.S. House and 1984 U.S. Senate elections). Since leaving the White House, Rove has worked as a political analyst and contributor for Fox News, Newsweek, and The Wall Street Journal.

== Early life and education ==
Rove was born on Christmas Day in Denver, Colorado, the second of five children, and was raised in Sparks, Nevada. His parents separated when he was 19 years old and the man whom Rove knew as his father was a geologist.

In 1965, his family moved to Salt Lake City, where Rove entered high school, becoming a skilled debater. Encouraged by a teacher to run for class senate, Rove won the election. As part of his campaign strategy, he rode in the back of a convertible inside the school gymnasium, sitting between two attractive girls before his election speech. While at Olympus High School, he was elected student council president his junior and senior years. Rove was also a Teenage Republican and served as Chairman of the Utah Federation of Teenage Republicans. During this time, his father got a job in Los Angeles and visited the family during holidays.

Rove's mother suffered from depression and had contemplated suicide more than once in her life. Rove has stated that although he loved his mother, she was seriously flawed, undependable and, at times, unstable. In December 1969, after a heated fight with his wife, the man Rove had known as his father left the family and divorced Rove's mother soon afterwards. It was at this juncture that Rove was finally told that he and his older brother had a different birth father, his mother's prior husband. Rove's relationship with his adoptive father was briefly strained for a few months following the divorce, but they maintained a relationship afterward.

Rove had only infrequent contact with his mother in the 1970s. She frequently withheld child support checks and spent them for herself. She and her second husband lost most of their money due to poor financial decisions on her part and his gambling and overspending. On September 11, 1981, Rove's mother died by suicide north of Reno, Nevada, shortly after she decided to divorce her third and final husband, to whom she had been unhappily married for only three months.

== Early political career ==
Rove began his involvement in American politics in 1968. In a 2002 Deseret News interview, Rove explained, "I was the Olympus High chairman for (former U.S. Sen.) Wallace F. Bennett's re-election campaign, where he was opposed by the dynamic, young, aggressive political science professor at the University of Utah, J.D. Williams." Bennett was reelected to a third six-year term in November 1968. Through Rove's campaign involvement, Bennett's son, Robert "Bob" Foster Bennett—a future United States Senator from Utah—would become a friend. Williams would later become a mentor to Rove.

=== College and the Dixon campaign sabotage incident ===
In the fall of 1969, Rove entered the University of Utah, on a $1,000 scholarship, as a political science major and joined the Pi Kappa Alpha fraternity. Through the university's Hinckley Institute of Politics, he got an internship with the Utah Republican Party. That position, and contacts from the 1968 Bennett campaign, helped him secure a job in 1970 on Ralph Tyler Smith's unsuccessful re-election campaign for Senate from Illinois against Democrat Adlai E. Stevenson III.

In the fall of 1970, Rove used a false identity to enter the campaign office of Democrat Alan J. Dixon, who was running for Treasurer of Illinois. He stole 1000 sheets of paper with campaign letterhead, printed fake campaign rally fliers promising "free beer, free food, girls and a good time for nothing", and distributed them at rock concerts and homeless shelters, with the effect of disrupting Dixon's rally. (Dixon eventually won the election.) Rove's role would not become publicly known until August 1973 when Rove told The Dallas Morning News. In 1999, he said, "It was a youthful prank at the age of 19 and I regret it." In his memoir, Rove wrote that when he was later nominated and confirmed to the Board for International Broadcasting by President George H. W. Bush, Senator Dixon did not kill his nomination. In Rove's account, "Dixon displayed more grace than I had shown and kindly excused this youthful prank."

=== College Republicans, Watergate, and the Bushes ===
In June 1971, after the end of the semester, Rove dropped out of the University of Utah to take a paid position as the executive director of the College Republican National Committee. Joe Abate, who was National Chairman of the College Republicans at the time, became his mentor. Rove then enrolled at the University of Maryland in College Park in the Fall of 1971, but withdrew from classes during the first half of the semester. In July 1999. he told The Washington Post that he did not have a degree because "I lack at this point one math class, which I can take by exam, and my foreign language requirement."

Rove traveled extensively, participating as an instructor at weekend seminars for campus conservatives across the country. He was an active participant in Richard Nixon's 1972 presidential campaign. A CBS report on the organization of the Nixon campaign from June 1972 includes an interview with a young Rove working for the College Republican National Committee.

Rove held the position of executive director of the College Republicans until early 1973. He left the job to spend five months, without pay, campaigning full-time for the position of National Chairman during the time he attended George Mason University. Lee Atwater, the group's Southern regional coordinator, who was two months younger than Rove, assisted with Rove's campaign. His campaign was managed by Daniel Mintz, of the Maryland College Republicans. Karl spent the spring of 1973 crisscrossing the country in a Ford Pinto, lining up the support of Republican state chairs.

The College Republicans summer 1973 convention at the Lake of the Ozarks resort in Missouri was quite contentious. Rove's opponent was Robert Edgeworth of Michigan. The other major candidate, Terry Dolan of California, dropped out, supporting Edgeworth. A number of states had sent two competing delegates, because Rove and his supporters had made credential challenges at state and regional conventions. For example, after the Midwest regional convention, Rove forces had produced a version of the Midwestern College Republicans constitution which differed significantly from the constitution that the Edgeworth forces were using, in order to justify the unseating of the Edgeworth delegates on procedural grounds, including delegations, such as Ohio and Missouri, which had been certified earlier by Rove himself. In the end, there were two votes, conducted by two convention chairs, and two winners—Rove and Edgeworth, each of whom delivered an acceptance speech. After the convention, both Edgeworth and Rove appealed to Republican National Committee Chairman George H. W. Bush, each contending that he was the new College Republican chairman.

While resolution was pending, Dolan went (anonymously) to The Washington Post with recordings of several training seminars for young Republicans where a co-presenter of Rove's, Bernie Robinson, cautioned against doing the same thing he had done: rooting through opponents' garbage cans. The tape with this story on it, as well as Rove's admonition not to copy similar tricks as Rove's against Dixon, was secretly recorded and edited by Rich Evans, who had hoped to receive an appointment from Rove's competitor in the CRNC chairmanship race. On August 10, 1973, in the midst of the Watergate scandal, the Post broke the story in an article titled "GOP Party Probes Official as Teacher of Tricks".

In response, then RNC Chairman George H.W. Bush, had an FBI agent question Rove. As part of the investigation, Atwater signed an affidavit, dated August 13, 1973, stating that he had heard a "20 minute anecdote similar to the one described in The Washington Post" in July 1972, but that "it was a funny story during a coffee break". Former Nixon White House Counsel John Dean, has been quoted as saying "based on my review of the files, it appears the Watergate prosecutors were interested in Rove's activities in 1972, but because they had bigger fish to fry they did not aggressively investigate him."

On September 6, 1973, three weeks after announcing his intent to investigate the allegations against Rove, George H. W. Bush chose him to be chairman of the College Republicans. Bush then wrote Edgeworth a letter saying that he had concluded that Rove had fairly won the vote at the convention. Edgeworth wrote back, asking about the basis of that conclusion. Not long after that, Edgeworth stated "Bush sent me back the angriest letter I have ever received in my life. I had leaked to The Washington Post, and now I was out of the Party forever."

As National Chairman, Rove introduced Bush to Atwater, who had taken Rove's job as the College Republican's executive director, and who would become Bush's main campaign strategist in future years. Bush hired Rove as a Special Assistant in the Republican National Committee, a job Rove left in 1974 to become Executive Assistant to the co-chair of the RNC, Richard D. Obenshain.

As Special Assistant, Rove performed small personal tasks for Bush. In November 1973, he asked Rove to take a set of car keys to his son George W. Bush, who was visiting home during a break from Harvard Business School. It was the first time the two met. "Huge amounts of charisma, swagger, cowboy boots, flight jacket, wonderful smile, just charisma – you know, wow", Rove recalled years later.

=== Virginia ===
In 1976, Rove left D.C. to work in Virginian politics. Initially, Rove was the Finance Director for the Republican Party of Virginia. Rove describes this as the role in which he discovered his love for direct mail campaigns.

== The Texas years and notable political campaigns ==
=== 1977–1991 ===
Rove's initial job in Texas was in 1977 as a legislative aide for Fred Agnich, a Texas Republican state representative from Dallas. Later that same year, Rove got a job as executive director of the Fund for Limited Government, a political action committee (PAC) in Houston headed by James A. Baker III, a Houston lawyer (later President George H. W. Bush's Secretary of State). The PAC eventually became the genesis of the Bush-for-President campaign of 1979–1980.

His work for Bill Clements during the Texas gubernatorial election of 1978 helped Clements become the first Republican Governor of Texas in over 100 years. Clements was elected to a four-year term, succeeding Democrat Dolph Briscoe. Rove was deputy director of the Governor William P. Clements Junior Committee in 1979 and 1980, and deputy executive assistant to the governor of Texas (roughly, Deputy Chief of Staff) in 1980 and 1981.

In 1981, Rove founded a direct mail consulting firm, Karl Rove & Co., in Austin. The firm's first clients included Texas Governor Bill Clements and Democratic congressman Phil Gramm, who later became a Republican congressman and United States Senator. Rove operated his consulting business until 1999, when he sold the firm to take a full-time position in George W. Bush's presidential campaign.

Between 1981 and 1999, Rove worked on hundreds of races. Most were in a supporting role, doing direct mail fundraising. A November 2004 Atlantic Monthly article estimated that he was the primary strategist for 41 statewide, congressional, and national races, and Rove's candidates won 34 races.

Rove also did work during those years for non-political clients. From 1991 to 1996, Rove advised tobacco giant Philip Morris, and ultimately earned $3,000 a month via a consulting contract. In a deposition, Rove testified that he severed the tie in 1996 because he felt awkward "about balancing that responsibility with his role as Bush's top political advisor" while Bush was governor of Texas and Texas was suing the tobacco industry.

==== 1978 George W. Bush congressional campaign ====
Rove advised the younger Bush during his unsuccessful Texas congressional campaign in 1978.

==== 1980 George H. W. Bush presidential campaign ====
In 1977, Rove was the first person hired by George H. W. Bush for his unsuccessful 1980 presidential campaign, which ended with Bush as the vice-presidential nominee.

==== 1982 Bill Clements gubernatorial campaign ====
In 1982, Rove returned to assisting Governor Bill Clements in his run for reelection, but was defeated by Democrat Mark White.

==== 1982 Phil Gramm congressional campaign ====
In 1982, Phil Gramm was elected to the U.S. House of Representatives as a conservative Texas Democrat.

==== 1984 Phil Gramm senatorial campaign ====
In 1984, Rove helped Gramm, who had become a Republican in 1983, defeat Republican Ron Paul in the primary and Democrat Lloyd Doggett in the race for U.S. Senate.

==== 1984 Ronald Reagan presidential campaign ====
Rove handled direct-mail for the Reagan-Bush campaign.

==== 1986 Bill Clements gubernatorial campaign ====
In 1986, Rove helped Clements become governor a second time. In a strategy memo Rove wrote for his client prior to the race, now among Clements' papers in the Texas A&M University library, Rove quoted Napoleon: "The whole art of war consists in a well-reasoned and extremely circumspect defensive, followed by rapid and audacious attack."

In 1986, just before a crucial debate in the campaign, Rove claimed that his office had been bugged by Democrats. The police and FBI investigated and discovered that the bug's battery was so small that it needed to be changed every few hours, and the investigation was dropped. Critics, including other Republican operatives, suspected Rove had bugged his own office to garner sympathy votes in the close governor's race.

==== 1988 Texas Supreme Court races ====
In 1988, Rove helped Thomas R. Phillips become the first Republican elected as Chief Justice of the Texas Supreme Court. Phillips had been appointed to the position in November 1987 by Clements. Phillips was re-elected in 1990, 1996 and 2002.

Phillips' election in 1988 was part of an aggressive grassroots campaign called "Clean Slate '88", a conservative effort that was successful in getting five of its six candidates elected. (Ordinarily there were three justices on the ballot each year, on a nine-justice court, but, because of resignations, there were six races for the Supreme Court on the ballot in November 1988.) By 1998, Republicans held all nine seats on the Court.

==== 1990 Texas gubernatorial campaign ====
In 1989, Rove encouraged George W. Bush to run for Texas governor, brought in experts to tutor him on policy, and introduced him to local reporters. Eventually, Bush decided not to run, and Rove backed another Republican for governor who lost in the primary.

==== Other 1990 Texas statewide races ====
In 1990, two other Rove candidates won: Rick Perry, the future governor of the state, became agricultural commissioner, and Kay Bailey Hutchison became state treasurer.

One notable aspect of the 1990 election was the charge that Rove had asked the Federal Bureau of Investigation (FBI) to investigate major Democratic officeholders in Texas. In his 2010 autobiography, Rove called the whole thing a "myth", saying:

The FBI did investigate Texas officials during that span, but I had nothing to do with it. The investigation was called "Brilab" and was part of a broad anti-corruption probe that looked at officials in Louisiana, Oklahoma, Los Angeles, and Washington, D.C., as well as Texas ... An official for the U.S. Department of Agriculture spotted expenses claimed by Hightower's shop that raised red flags ... enough to indict some of Hightower's top aides; they were later found guilty and sent to prison. ... The myth that I had something to do both with spurring the investigation and with airing all of this has stuck around because it is convenient for some to blame me rather than those aides who ran afoul of the law.

Rove was campaign manager for Florence Shapiro's 1992 campaign for District 2 in the Texas Senate, which included Collin County and counties in East Texas. Shapiro was the top vote-getter in the Republican primary against Don Kent and former Plano mayor Jack Harvard, then defeated Kent by 1 percentage point in a hotly-contested run-off election, during which vandals defaced her campaign signs with swastikas due to Shapiro's Jewish faith.

==== 1991 Richard L. Thornburgh senatorial campaign and lawsuit ====
In 1991, United States Attorney General Dick Thornburgh resigned to run for a Senate seat in Pennsylvania, one made vacant by John Heinz's death in a helicopter crash. Rove's company worked for the campaign, but it ended with an upset loss to Democrat Harris Wofford.

Rove had been hired by an intermediary Murray Dickman to work for Thornburgh's campaign. Subsequently, Rove sued Thornburgh directly, alleging non-payment for services rendered. The Republican National Committee, worried that the suit would make it hard to recruit good candidates, urged Rove to back off. When Rove refused, the RNC hired Kenneth Starr to write an amicus brief on Thornburgh's behalf. Karl Rove & Co. v. Thornburgh was heard by U.S. Federal Judge Sam Sparks, who had been appointed by George H.W. Bush in 1991. After a trial in Austin, Rove prevailed.

=== 1992 George H. W. Bush presidential campaign ===
Rove was fired from the 1992 Bush presidential campaign after he planted a negative story with columnist Robert Novak about dissatisfaction with campaign fundraising chief Robert Mosbacher Jr. Novak's column suggested a motive when it described the firing of Mosbacher by former Senator Phil Gramm: "Also attending the session was political consultant Karl Rove, who had been shoved aside by Mosbacher." Novak and Rove denied that Rove leaked, but Mosbacher maintained that "Rove is the only one with a motive to leak this. We let him go. I still believe he did it." During testimony before the CIA leak grand jury, Rove apparently confirmed his prior involvement with Novak in the 1992 campaign leak, according to National Journal reporter Murray Waas.

=== 1993–2000 ===
1993 Kay Bailey Hutchison senatorial campaign

Rove helped Hutchison win a special Senate election in June 1993. Hutchison defeated Democrat Bob Krueger to fill the last two years of Lloyd Bentsen's term. Bentsen had resigned to become Secretary of the Treasury in the Clinton administration.

1994 Alabama Supreme Court races

In 1994, a group called the Business Council of Alabama hired Rove to help run a slate of Republican candidates for the state supreme court. No Republican had been elected to that court in more than a century. The campaign by the Republicans was unprecedented in the state, which had previously only seen low-key contests. After the election, a court battle over absentee and other ballots followed that lasted more than 11 months. It ended when a federal appeals court judge ruled that disputed absentee ballots could not be counted, and ordered the Alabama Secretary of State to certify the Republican candidate for Chief Justice, Perry Hooper, as the winner. An appeal to the Supreme Court by the Democratic candidate was turned down within a few days, making the ruling final. Hooper won by 262 votes.

Another candidate, Harold See, ran against Mark Kennedy, an incumbent Democratic justice and the son-in-law of George Wallace. The race included charges that Kennedy was mingling campaign funds with those of a non-profit children's foundation he was involved with. A former Rove staffer reported that some within the See camp initiated a whisper campaign that Kennedy was a pedophile. Kennedy won by less than one percentage point.

1994 John Ashcroft senatorial campaign

In 1993, Karl Rove & Company was paid $300,000 in consulting fees by Ashcroft's successful 1994 Senate campaign. Ashcroft paid Rove's company more than $700,000 over the course of three campaigns.

1994 George W. Bush gubernatorial campaign

In 1993, Rove began advising George W. Bush in his successful campaign to become governor of Texas. Bush announced his candidacy in November 1993. By January 1994, Bush had spent more than $600,000 on the race against incumbent Democrat Ann Richards, with $340,000 of that paid to Rove's firm.

Rove has been accused of using the push poll technique to call voters to ask such things as whether people would be "more or less likely to vote for Governor Richards if [they] knew her staff is dominated by lesbians". Rove has denied having been involved in circulating these rumors about Richards during the campaign, although many critics nonetheless identify this technique, particularly as used in this instance against Richards, as a hallmark of his career.

1996 Harold See's campaign for Associate Justice, Alabama Supreme Court

A former campaign worker charged that, at Rove's behest, he distributed flyers that anonymously attacked Harold See, their own client. This put the opponent's campaign in an awkward position; public denials of responsibility for the scurrilous flyers would be implausible. Rove's client was elected.

1998 George W. Bush gubernatorial campaign

Rove was an adviser for Bush's 1998 reelection campaign. From July through December 1998, Bush's reelection committee paid Rove & Co. nearly $2.5 million, and also paid the Rove-owned Praxis List Company $267,000 for use of mailing lists. Rove says his work for the Bush campaign included direct mail, voter contact, phone banks, computer services, and travel expenses. Of the $2.5 million, Rove said, "[a]bout 30 percent of that is postage". In all, Bush (primarily through Rove's efforts) raised $17.7 million, with $3.4 million unspent as of March 1999. During the course of this campaign Rove's much-reported feud with Rick Perry began, with Perry's strategists believing Rove gave Perry bad advice in order to help Bush get a larger share of the Hispanic vote.

2000 Harold See campaign for Chief Justice

For the race to succeed Perry Hooper, who was retiring as Alabama's chief justice, Rove lined up support for See from a majority of the state's important Republicans.

=== 2000 George W. Bush presidential campaign and the sale of Karl Rove & Co. ===
In early 1999, Rove sold his 20-year-old direct-mail business, Karl Rove & Co., which provided campaign services to candidates, along with Praxis List Company (in whole or part) to Ted Delisi and Todd Olsen, two young political operatives who had worked on campaigns of some other Rove candidates. Rove helped finance the sale of the company, which had 11 employees. Selling Karl Rove & Co. was a condition that George W. Bush had insisted on before Rove took the job of chief strategist for Bush's presidential bid.

During the Republican primary, Rove was accused of spreading false rumors that John McCain had fathered an illegitimate black child. Rove denies the accusation.

== George W. Bush administration ==
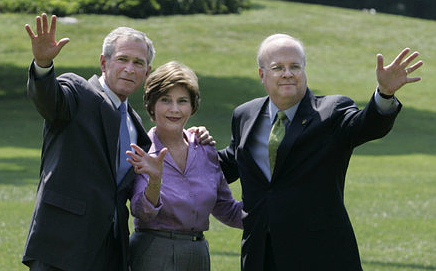
Rove with George W. and Laura Bush

When George W. Bush was first inaugurated in January 2001, Rove accepted an appointment as Senior Advisor. He was later given the title Deputy Chief of Staff to the President after the successful 2004 presidential election. In a November 2004 speech, Bush publicly thanked Rove, calling him "the architect" of his victory over John Kerry in the 2004 presidential election. In April 2006, Rove was reassigned from his policy development role to one focusing on strategic and tactical planning in anticipation of the November 2006 congressional elections.

=== Iraq War ===
Rove played a leading role in the lead-up to the Iraq War. In 2002 and 2003, Rove chaired meetings of the White House Iraq Group (WHIG), an internal White House working group established in August 2002, eight months prior to the 2003 invasion of Iraq. WHIG was charged with developing a strategy "for publicizing the White House's assertion that Saddam Hussein posed a threat to the United States." The group pushed narratives within the administration about the Hussein regime possessing weapons of mass destruction (the regime had no active WMD program) and its ties to international terrorism (the Hussein regime had no operational relationship with al-Qaeda). Members of WHIG included Bush's Chief of Staff Andrew Card, national security advisor Condoleezza Rice, her deputy Stephen Hadley, Vice President Dick Cheney's Chief of Staff Lewis "Scooter" Libby, legislative liaison Nicholas E. Calio, and communication strategists Mary Matalin, Karen Hughes, and James R. Wilkinson.

Quoting one unnamed WHIG member, The Washington Post explained that the task force's mission was to "educate the public" about the threat posed by Saddam and (in the reporters' words) "[to] set strategy for each stage of the confrontation with Baghdad". Rove's "strategic communications" task force within WHIG helped write and coordinate speeches by senior Bush administration officials, emphasizing Iraq's purported nuclear threat. The White House Iraq Group was "little known" until a subpoena for its notes, email, and attendance records was issued by CIA leak investigator Patrick Fitzgerald in January 2004.

In 2015, Rove defended the decision to invade Iraq, telling an Iraq War veteran that Saddam Hussein was a threat to the United States. In 2010, Rove said his biggest mistake regarding the Iraq War was to not push back on the narrative that the Bush administration lied to lead the U.S. into the Iraq War.

=== Valerie Plame affair ===
On August 29, 2003, retired ambassador Joseph C. Wilson IV claimed that Rove leaked the identity of Wilson's wife, Valerie Plame, as a Central Intelligence Agency (CIA) employee, in retaliation for Wilson's op-ed in The New York Times in which he criticized the Bush administration's citation of the yellowcake documents among the justifications for the War in Iraq enumerated in Bush's 2003 State of the Union Address.

In late August 2006, it became known that Richard L. Armitage was responsible for the leak. The investigation led to felony charges being filed against Lewis "Scooter" Libby for perjury and obstruction of justice. Eventually, Libby was found guilty by a jury.

On June 13, 2006, prosecutors said they would not charge Rove with any wrongdoing. Special Counsel Patrick Fitzgerald stated previously that "I can tell you that the substantial bulk of the work of this investigation is concluded."

On July 13, 2006, Plame sued Cheney, Rove, Libby, and others, accusing them of conspiring to destroy her career.

On May 2, 2007, the Senate Judiciary Committee issued a subpoena to Attorney General Gonzales compelling the Department of Justice to produce all email from Rove regarding the dismissal of U.S. attorneys controversy, no matter what email account Rove may have used, with a deadline of May 15, 2007, for compliance. The subpoena also demanded relevant email previously produced in the Valerie Plame scandal and the investigation regarding the CIA leak scandal (2003). On August 31, 2007, Karl Rove resigned without responding to the Senate Judiciary Committee subpoena, saying, "I just think it's time to leave."

Former Bush press secretary Scott McClellan claims in his book What Happened: Inside the Bush White House and Washington's Culture of Deception, published in the spring of 2008 by Public Affairs Books, that the statements he made in 2003 about Rove's lack of involvement in the Valerie Plame affair were untrue, and that he had been encouraged to repeat such untruths. His book has been widely disputed, however, with many key members of McClellan's own staff telling a completely different story. Former CNN commentator Robert Novak has questioned if McClelland wrote the book himself. It was also revealed that the publisher was seeking a negative book to increase sales.

=== 2006 congressional elections and beyond ===
On October 24, 2006, two weeks before the congressional election, in an interview with National Public Radio's Robert Siegel, Rove insisted that his insider polling data forecast Republican retention of both houses. In the election the Democrats won both houses of Congress. The White House Bulletin, published by Bulletin News, cited rumors of Rove's impending departure from the White House staff: "'Karl represents the old style and he's got to go if the Democrats are going to believe Bush's talk of getting along', said a key Bush advisor." However, while allowing that many Republican members of Congress are "resentful of the way he and the White House conducted the losing campaign", The New York Times also stated that, "White House officials say President Bush has every intention of keeping Mr. Rove on through the rest of his term."

In Rove's analysis, 10 of the 28 House seats Republicans lost were sacrificed because of various scandals. Another six, he said, were lost because incumbents did not recognize and react quickly enough to the threat. Rove argued that, without corruption and complacency, the Democrats would have gained around a dozen seats and Republicans could have kept narrow control of the House regardless of Bush's troubles and the war.

=== Torture ===
Rove defended the Bush administration's use of waterboarding, a form of torture.

=== E-mail scandal ===
Due to investigations into White House staffers' e-mail communication related to the controversy over the dismissal of United States attorneys, it was discovered that many White House staff members, including Rove, had exchanged documents using Republican National Committee e‑mail servers such as gwb43.com and georgewbush.com or personal e‑mail accounts with third party providers such as BlackBerry; evasion of U.S. government record-keeping was determined to be a violation of the Presidential Records Act. Over 500 of Rove's e‑mails were mistakenly sent to a parody website, who forwarded them to an investigative reporter.

=== Congressional subpoenas ===
On May 22, 2008, Rove was subpoenaed by House Judiciary Committee Chairman John Conyers to testify on the politicization of the Department of Justice. But on July 10, Rove refused to obey the congressional subpoena, citing executive privilege as his reason.

On February 23, 2009, Rove was required by congressional subpoena to testify before the House Judiciary Committee concerning his knowledge of the controversy over the dismissal of seven U.S. attorneys, and the alleged political prosecution of former Alabama Governor Don Siegelman, but did not appear on that date. He and former White House Counsel Harriet Miers later agreed to testify under oath before Congress about these matters.

On July 7 and July 30, 2009, Rove testified before the House Judiciary Committee regarding questions about the dismissal of seven U.S. attorneys under the Bush administration. Rove was also questioned regarding the federal prosecution of former Alabama Governor Don Siegelman, who was convicted of fraud. The Committee concluded that Rove had played a significant role in the Attorney firings.

== Activities after leaving the White House ==
=== Activities in 2008 ===
Shortly after leaving the White House, Rove was hired to write about the 2008 presidential election for Newsweek. He was also later hired as a contributor for The Wall Street Journal and a political analyst for Fox News. Rove was an informal advisor to 2008 Republican presidential candidate John McCain, and donated $2,300 to his campaign. His memoir, Courage and Consequence, was published in March 2010. One advance reviewer, Dana Milbank of The Washington Post, said of the book that Rove "revives claims discredited long ago". The controversial book inspired a grassroots rock and roll compilation of a similar name, Courage and Consequence, that was released a week before the memoir.

On March 9, 2008, Rove appeared at the University of Iowa as a paid speaker to a crowd of approximately 1,000. He was met with hostility and two students were removed by police after attempting a citizen's arrest for alleged crimes committed during his time with the Bush administration. Near the end of the speech, a member of the audience asked, "Can we have our $40,000 back?" Rove replied, "No, you can't."

On June 24, 2008, Rove said of Democratic presidential nominee Barack Obama, "Even if you never met him, you know this guy. He's the guy at the country club with the beautiful date, holding a martini and a cigarette that stands against the wall and makes snide comments about everyone."

In July 2008, Rove, who was hired by Fox News to provide analysis for the network's November 2008 election coverage, defended his role on the news team to the Television Critics Association.

Rove agreed to debate one-time presidential candidate and former Senator John Edwards on September 26, 2008, at the University at Buffalo. However, Edwards dropped out and was replaced by General Wesley Clark.

=== Since 2009 ===
In September 2009, Rove was inducted into the Scandinavian-American Hall of Fame. The induction became a major dispute as political views clashed over the announcement. Governor John Hoeven was scheduled to introduce Rove during the SAHF banquet but did not attend. At that time, Rove was being investigated by Democrats in Congress for his role in the 2006 dismissal of nine U.S. attorneys.

In 2010, with former RNC chair Ed Gillespie, Rove helped found American Crossroads, a Republican 527 organization raising money for the 2012 election effort. Rove serves as an informal adviser for this Super-PAC.

In a profile which appeared in the December 15, 2011 issue of The New Republic, Rove, with his hands-on involvement with American Crossroads, was described as one of the shrewdest navigators of the political climate after the Supreme Court's Citizens United decision which exempted political broadcasts funded by corporations and unions from campaign finance limits. "Rove had no role in creating this new legal environment... but if Rove and his allies did not invent it, they certainly were adroit at exploiting it."

Following Todd Akin's comments regarding "legitimate rape" and the notion that raped women are unlikely to become pregnant, Rove joked about murdering the Missouri Senate candidate, saying "We should sink Todd Akin. If he's found mysteriously murdered, don't look for my whereabouts!" After multiple news outlets picked up on the story, Rove apologized for the remark. Rove's Crossroads GPS organization had previously pulled its television advertising from Missouri in the wake of the comments.

On November 6, 2012, Rove protested Fox News' call of the 2012 presidential election for Obama, prompting host Megyn Kelly to ask him, "Is this just math that you do as a Republican to make yourself feel better? Or is this real?" Rove claimed that Obama had won the election by "suppressing the vote".

In 2013 Rove and the PAC American Crossroads created the Conservative Victory Project for the purpose of supporting electable conservative candidates. These efforts have attracted criticism, and even personal attacks, from elements within the Tea Party movement.

Rove's history, The Triumph of William McKinley: Why the Election of 1896 Still Matters, was published in 2015.

In 2017, Rove's 501(c)(4) dark money group One Nation nonprofit raised nearly $17 million, according to IRS tax filings released in November 2018.

Rove has lobbied on behalf of Rivada Networks, a communications technology business.

In December 2019, Rove predicted that the 2020 Democratic Party presidential primaries would result in a contested convention; in December 2020, after Joe Biden was nominated at the 2020 Democratic National Convention with a clear majority of delegates, Politico named Rove's prediction one of "the most audacious, confident and spectacularly incorrect prognostications about the year".

Rove was an advisor to Donald Trump's 2020 presidential campaign. In May 2020, Rove accused former president Obama of engaging in a "political drive by shooting" after Obama gave a commencement speech to historically black colleges where he criticized the federal government's response to the coronavirus pandemic.

Rove worked as a guest professor at the University of Texas at Austin in the fall semester of 2021. He taught a course for UT's Plan II Honors department called Modern American Political Campaigns. Each week Rove invited guest speakers for the students to interview including James Carville and Mary Matalin, former Secretary of State James Baker, Jonathan Swan, Ken Mehlman, and others. The class was protested by a variety of students accusing Rove of being a war criminal.

== Personal life ==
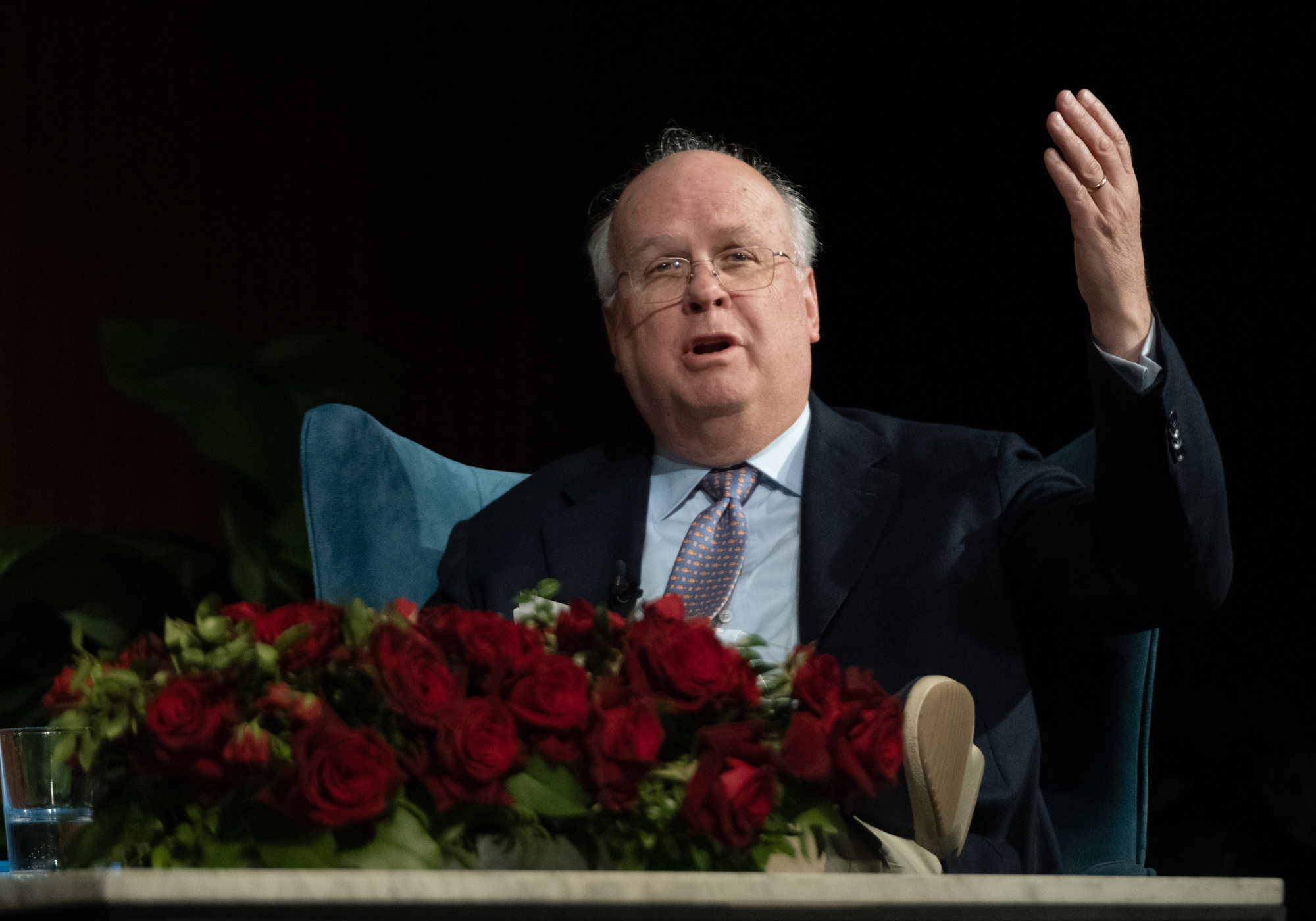
Rove at the LBJ Library in 2024

Rove married Houston socialite Valerie Mather Wainwright, on July 10, 1976. He moved to Texas in January 1977. His sister and father said that "the wedding was so extravagant that [we] ... still recall it with awe". Rove and Wainwright divorced in early 1980. In January 1986, Rove married Darby Tara Hickson, a breast cancer survivor, graphic designer, and former employee of Karl Rove & Company. Rove and Hickson have one son, Andrew Madison Rove, who attended Trinity University in San Antonio, Texas. Rove and Hickson divorced in December 2009. In June 2012, Rove married lobbyist Karen Johnson in Austin, Texas. The wedding was attended by George W. Bush and Steve Wynn.

Rove resides in the Georgetown section of Washington, D.C., and also maintains a house near Austin, Texas. In 2002, Rove built a home in Rosemary Beach, Florida, near Panama City; the home includes a television studio for remote news appearances.

In a 2007 interview with the New York Review of Books, atheist Christopher Hitchens claimed that Rove was "not a believer". However, in 2010, Rove told Kamy Akhavan of ProCon.org, in an e‑mail exchange, that Hitchens had misinterpreted a quote of his about feeling that the faith of other White House staffers was stronger than his own: "I am a practicing Christian who attends a Bible-centered Episcopal church in Washington and an Anglican church in Texas."

Political offices
Preceded by Sidney Blumenthal; Joel Johnson; Doug Sosnik	Senior Advisor to the President; 2001–2007	Succeeded by Barry Jackson
Preceded by Harriet Miers	White House Deputy Chief of Staff for Policy; 2005–2007	Succeeded by Joel Kaplan
