= White House Office of Strategic Initiatives =

Agency of the George W. Bush administration

The White House Office of Strategic Initiatives (OSI) was a staff unit within the Executive Office of the President of the United States during the administration of U.S. President George W. Bush. Karl Rove was the first head of the office as Senior Advisor to the President. Peter Wehner took over as head of the office in 2002 until August 2007.

The Office was located in the Eisenhower Executive Office Building. The Office's function was to focus on ideas and possible presidential actions to address issues which would contribute directly to the President's political standing. Although given no official authority over other Executive functions, the OSI could review and make recommendations on classified national security issues, judicial nominations, and other subjects of potential political significance.

This office was dissolved with the end of the Bush Presidency.
