= Peter Wehner =

American writer (born 1961)

- Born: Peter Hermann Wehner; February 10, 1961 (age 65); Dallas, Texas, U.S.
- Education: University of Washington
- Occupations: Author, essayist, former speech writer
- Spouse: Cindy Wehner
- Writing career
- Notable works: The Death of Politics; City of Man; Wealth and Justice

Peter Hermann Wehner (born February 10, 1961) is an American writer and former speechwriter for the administrations of three Republican U.S. presidents. He is a senior fellow at the Trinity Forum. Wehner is a contributing opinion writer for The New York Times, a contributing editor at The Atlantic, and the author of The Death of Politics.

== Early life and education ==
Wehner was born on February 10, 1961, in Dallas, Texas, to Ingeborg and Alfred Wehner. He is the youngest of his siblings. Wehner grew up in Richland, Washington, and attended Hanford High School. Wehner earned a degree from the University of Washington.

== Career ==
Wehner served in three Republican administrations, those of Ronald Reagan, George H. W. Bush, and George W. Bush. He was a speechwriter for Secretary of Education William Bennett before becoming special assistant to the director at the Office of National Drug Control Policy. Wehner was then executive director for policy for Empower America, a conservative group, which was founded by Bennett, Jack Kemp, and Jeane Kirkpatrick. Wehner served George W. Bush as deputy director of speechwriting in 2001, and became the head of the White House Office of Strategic Initiatives in 2002. After leaving the White House in 2007, Wehner joined the Ethics and Public Policy Center as a senior fellow. He also served as an advisor to several presidential campaigns.

Wehner is the author or the co-author of three books: The Death of Politics: How to Heal Our Frayed Republic After Trump, City of Man: Religion and Politics in a New Era (with Michael J. Gerson), and Wealth and Justice: The Morality of Democratic Capitalism (with Arthur C. Brooks). He is considered a leading conservative critic of Donald Trump. The Death of Politics serves as a "spirited defense of politics" while providing a path toward recovery. In Wealth and Justice, published by American Enterprise Institute Press, Wehner and Brooks argue that the free market and capitalism, when properly functioning, act "as a civilizing agent" that improves the moral condition of society by prizing "thrift, savings, and investment" and discouraging "bribery, corruption, and lawlessness".

During his career, Wehner's work appeared in The Atlantic, Christianity Today, Commentary, the Financial Times, National Affairs, The New York Times, Politico, Time, The Wall Street Journal, The Washington Post, and The Weekly Standard. Wehner also appeared on many cable news channels, C-SPAN, and talk radio. He became a contributing editor at The Atlantic and contributing op-ed writer at The New York Times in 2015.

== Views and positions ==
According to the Institute for Policy Studies, Wehner's work usually centers on "domestic policy and Christian ethics", although he is "a reliable hawk on foreign affairs and he tends to view foreign policy through the prism of moralism". Wehner rejects the idea of pacifism and believes that "self-defense and violence in response to attack—violence even in an effort to promote justice and human dignity and human flourishing—can be justified".

Wehner opposes abortion. Wehner supported the 2003 invasion of Iraq, but later criticized the subsequent U.S. war strategy. He called the President's Emergency Plan for AIDS Relief (PEPFAR)—which allocated $15 billion to promote prevention and treatment of HIV/AIDS and malaria in Africa—as "one of the great achievements of the [George W.] Bush administration." Wehner was a "vocal critic of the Obama administration", contending that President Barack Obama "undermined America's moral self-confidence".

Wehner believes that young evangelicals ought to support Israel based on its record of "human rights, social justice, the advancement of human flourishing, [and] a government that is accountable and based on the rule of law... Young evangelicals whose understanding of Israel is dominated by a narrative of Israeli misdeeds ought to be told the story of Palestinian misconduct, ethical transgressions, authoritarian rule, and horrifying anti-Semitism—and told it in a way that increases the chances they will hear it." Wehner blames Palestinian leadership for what he sees as its betrayal of its own people and for making "anti-Semitism a central, organizing principle of Palestine life—more central, even, than Palestinian statehood."

=== Religion ===
Wehner opposes the view that "the Sermon on the Mount is a political philosophy" and says that "often Christians make the mistake of assuming the words of Christ and the individual commands, or commands that apply to individuals, apply to governments as well". He criticized the "tone and spirit" of Christian right leaders such as Pat Robertson and Jerry Falwell, criticizing them for "apocalyptic language" in the political arena and making "theological errors" (such as blaming the September 11 attacks on abortion and the ACLU). He praised Rick Warren and Tim Keller, saying that their "mode of argumentation and mode of conversation" is better than what "Falwell and Robertson embodied" because it is characterized by a willingness to engage with people of differing views, a "kind of civility and a certain high-mindedness", and a very solid "philosophical as well as theological foundation". Wehner argues that evangelicals' support for Trump "comes at a high cost for Christian witness".

=== Donald Trump ===
Wehner is a staunch critic of Trump. He joined many Republican figures who announced that they would not vote for him when Trump announced that he would seek the Republican nomination. In a January 2016 column in The New York Times entitled "Why I Will Never Vote for Donald Trump", Wehner wrote that, if Trump was the Republican nominee and Hillary Clinton the Democratic nominee, "I would prefer to vote for a responsible third-party alternative; absent that option, I would simply not cast a ballot for President. A lot of Republicans, I suspect, would do the same." In another Times op-ed in July 2016, Wehner wrote that Trump "embodies a Nietzschean morality rather than a Christian one", writing that Trump is "characterized by indifference to objective truth (there are no facts, only interpretations), the repudiation of Christian concern for the poor and the weak, and disdain for the powerless". He also wrote:

it is fair to say that there existed in the Republican Party repulsive elements, people who were attracted to racial and ethnic politics and moved by resentment and intolerance rather than a vision of the good. This group was larger than I ever imagined, and at important moments the Republican Party either overlooked them or played to them. Some may have been hoping to appeal to these elements while also containing and moderating them, to sand off the rough edges, to keep them within the coalition but not allow them to become dominant. But the opposite happened. The party guests took over the party.

A day after Trump was inaugurated as president, Wehner wrote a column in The New York Times in which he expressed doubt that Trump would govern well. In a column appearing a day after the dismissal of James Comey as FBI Director, which Trump did when Comey asked for additional resources to investigate Russian interference in the 2016 U.S. elections, Wehner wrote that his prediction had been accurate. In July 2017, Wehner wrote, "Republican voters and politicians rallied around Mr. Trump in 2016, believing he was anti-establishment when in fact he was anti-order. He turns out to be an institutional arsonist. It is an irony of American history that the Republican Party, which has historically valued order and institutions, has become the conduit of chaos." By February 2019, Wehner lamented that the Republican Party is "now Donald Trump's party, through and through".

After Trump's defeat in the 2020 U.S. presidential election, Wehner wrote that "Trump's most enduring legacy [may be] a nihilistic political culture, one that is tribalistic, distrustful, and sometimes delusional, swimming in conspiracy theories." After reports emerged that Trump was considering imposing martial law to overturn the election and that he might appoint conspiracy theorist Sidney Powell as a special counsel, Wehner wrote that Trump had "begun to lose his mind" and had "become even more destabilizing and dangerous"; he lamented that much of the Republican Party followed Trump's lead and been "radicalized". After the removal of Liz Cheney from the House leadership, Wehner was quoted in The Atlantic's electronic newsletter of May 12, 2021, in a section headed "The new GOP is a threat to American democracy", as having said, "The Trump presidency might have been the first act in a longer and even darker political drama, in which the Republican Party is becoming more radicalized."

== Personal life ==
Wehner and his wife Cindy live in McLean, Virginia; they have three children. He attends McLean Presbyterian Church.

== Works ==
- (with Michael J. Gerson) City of Man: Religion and Politics in a New Era Chicago : Moody Publishers, 2010. ISBN 9780802458575, OCLC 505420332.
- (with Arthur C. Brooks) Wealth and Justice: The Morality of Democratic Capitalism Washington, DC AEI Press, 2010. ISBN 9780844743776, OCLC 837668483.
- The Death of Politics: How to Heal Our Frayed Republic After Trump, New York, NY : HarperOne, 2019. ISBN 9780062820792, OCLC 1097366455.
- The Deepening Crisis in Evangelical Christianity; Support for Trump comes at a high cost for Christian witness. July 5, 2019, The Atlantic.

== See also ==
- List of Republicans who opposed the Donald Trump 2016 presidential campaign
- List of Republicans who opposed the Donald Trump 2020 presidential campaign
