= Robert Sedler =

American law professor and attorney (1935–2025)

- Born: Robert Allen Sedler; September 11, 1935; Pittsburgh, Pennsylvania, United States
- Died: January 4, 2025 (aged 89)
- Occupations: Law professor; attorney
- Spouse: Rozanne
- Children: Eric

Academic background
- Education: University of Pittsburgh; University of Pittsburgh School of Law (JD)

Academic work
- Sub-discipline: Constitutional law
- Institutions: University of Kentucky College of Law (until 1977); Wayne State University Law School (1977–2020)

Robert Allen Sedler (September 11, 1935 – January 4, 2025) was an American law professor and attorney, who taught at Wayne State University Law School for over 40 years, specializing in Constitutional law. Sedler began teaching at Wayne Law in 1977, prior to which he was a professor at the University of Kentucky College of Law. Sedler retired in December 2020, after finishing the fall semester.

== Life and career ==
Sedler was born in Pittsburgh on September 11, 1935.

Sedler graduated from University of Pittsburgh in 1956, and later obtained a Juris Doctor from the University of Pittsburgh School of Law, in 1959.

Sedler taught law courses in Ethiopia at the former Haile Selassie I University (now Addis Ababa University) in the 1960s. Sedler worked with the American Civil Liberties Union (ACLU) in Kentucky starting in the 1960s, serving as the ACLU of Kentucky's first general counsel, from 1967 to 1975. While with the ACLU, Sedler opposed racial segregation and challenges to the First Amendment.

Sedler wrote dozens of essays on First Amendment and civil rights jurisprudence. Sedler also wrote two books and dozens of articles on Ethiopian law. He authored one textbook, Constitutional Law in the United States, and a book on conflict of laws, Across State Lines. Sedler died on January 4, 2025, at age 89.
