= Senior Advisor to the President of the United States =

Title of political advisor to the United States president

Senior Advisor to the President
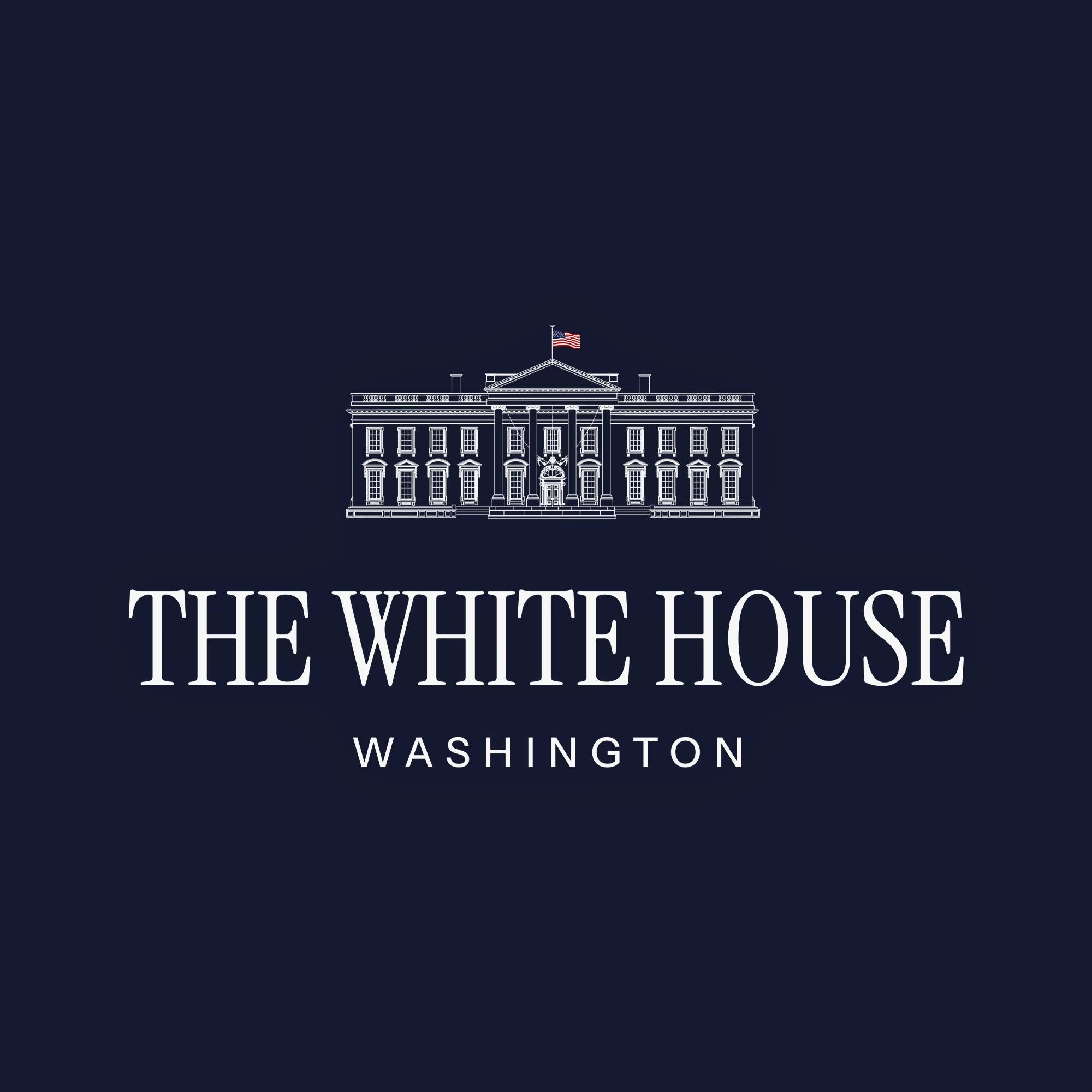

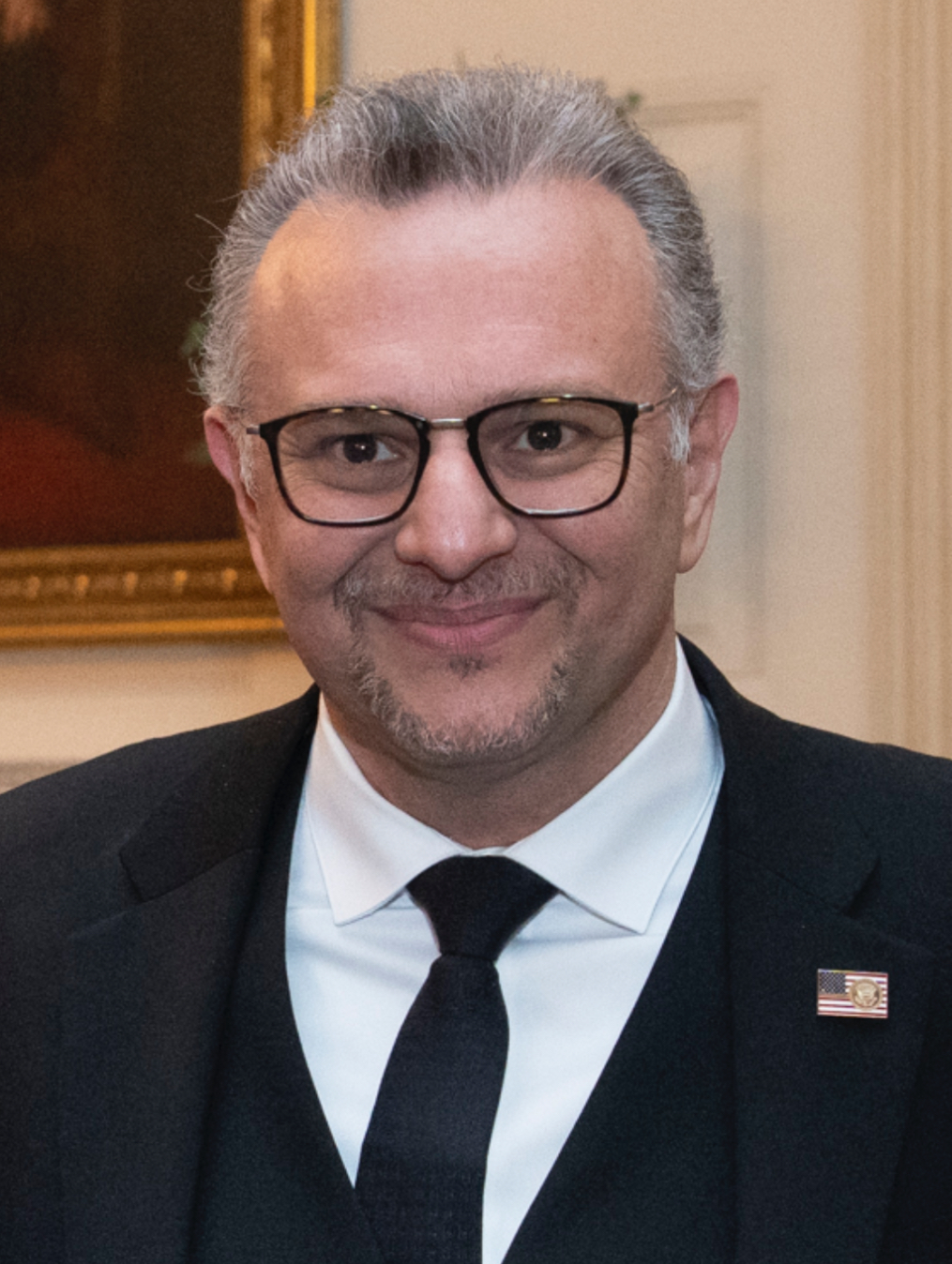
- Incumbent; Massad Boulos since January 20, 2025
- Executive Office of the President; White House Office
- Reports to: President of the United States
- Appointer: President of the United States
- Formation: January 20, 1993; 33 years ago
- First holder: Rahm Emanuel
- Website: The White House

Senior Advisor to the President is a title used by high-ranking political advisors to the president of the United States. Senior advisors to the president do not have formal government decision making authority, but they can have significant influence over decisions. Their role is to provide strategic advice, analysis, and recommendations to the president on key issues.

White House senior advisors are senior members of the White House Office. The title has been formally used since 1993.

== Responsibilities ==
Over time, a senior advisor has had responsibility for the following groups:

White House departments (previously headed by a senior advisor in past administrations)

- American Rescue Plan / COVID-19 Relief
- Office of American Innovation
- White House Office on Clean Energy Innovation and Implementation
- White House Office of Infrastructure Implementation Coordination
- White House Office of Communications
- White House Office of Strategic Initiatives
- White House Office of Intergovernmental Affairs
- White House Office of Political Affairs
- White House Office of Public Engagement
- White House Office of the Staff Secretary

== Prior administrations ==
In prior administrations before 1993, the position of "senior advisor" was a title used for various other purposes. Numerous examples of the position also exist throughout the executive departments and in the branch's independent agencies. For example, the Food and Drug Administration includes a position with the title Senior Advisor for Science; the Department of the Interior has a position with the title Senior Advisor for Alaskan Affairs.

Examples of people who had the responsibilities and/or influence of a senior advisor without the title included Edward M. House (to Woodrow Wilson) and Louis Howe (to Franklin D. Roosevelt)

== List of senior advisors to the president ==
Name		Portfolio	Start	End	Party	President(s)	Ref.
Rahm Emanuel	Rahm Emanuel (born 1959)	Political Affairs; Strategic Planning; Policy	January 20, 1993	November 7, 1998	Democratic	Bill Clinton (1993–2001)	
George Stephanopoulos	George Stephanopoulos (born 1961)	Strategic Planning; Policy	June 7, 1993	December 10, 1996	Democratic	Bill Clinton (1993–2001)	
Sidney Blumenthal	Sidney Blumenthal (born 1948)	Political Affairs; Communications; Policy	August 19, 1997	January 20, 2001	Democratic	Bill Clinton (1993–2001)	
	Doug Sosnik (born 1959)	Political Affairs; Strategic Planning; Policy	November 7, 1998	January 20, 2001	Democratic	Bill Clinton (1993–2001)	
	Joel Johnson (born 1961)	Communications; Policy	May 20, 1999	January 20, 2001	Democratic	Bill Clinton (1993–2001)	
Karl Rove	Karl Rove (born 1950)	Political Affairs; Strategic Initiatives; Communications	January 20, 2001	August 31, 2007	Republican	George W. Bush (2001–2009)	
Barry Steven Jackson	Barry Jackson (born 1960)	Political Affairs; Strategic Planning; Communications	September 1, 2007	January 20, 2009	Republican	George W. Bush (2001–2009)	
David Axelrod	David Axelrod (born 1955)	Political Affairs; Communications	January 20, 2009	January 10, 2011	Democratic	Barack Obama (2009–2017)	
Valerie Jarrett	Valerie Jarrett (born 1956)	Public Engagement; Intergovernmental Affairs	January 20, 2009	January 20, 2017	Democratic	Barack Obama (2009–2017)	
Pete Rouse	Pete Rouse (born 1946)	Strategic Planning	January 20, 2009	October 1, 2010	Democratic	Barack Obama (2009–2017)	
David Plouffe	David Plouffe (born 1967)	Political Affairs; Communications	January 10, 2011	January 25, 2013	Democratic	Barack Obama (2009–2017)	
	Stephanie Cutter (born 1968)	Message and Communications	January 27, 2011	September 2011	Democratic	Barack Obama (2009–2017)	(Note: Stephanie Cutter held the official title of "Assistant to the President and Deputy Senior Advisor" during her time in office.)
Daniel Pfeiffer	Daniel Pfeiffer (born 1975)	Political Affairs; Communications	January 25, 2013	March 6, 2015	Democratic	Barack Obama (2009–2017)	
Brian Deese	Brian Deese (born 1978)	Climate and Energy	February 13, 2015	January 20, 2017	Democratic	Barack Obama (2009–2017)	
Shailagh Murray	Shailagh Murray (born 1965)	Communications	April 3, 2015	January 20, 2017	Democratic	Barack Obama (2009–2017)	
Jared Kushner	Jared Kushner (born 1981)	Strategic Planning; American Innovation	January 20, 2017	January 20, 2021	Republican	Donald Trump (2017–2021)	
Stephen Miller	Stephen Miller (born 1985)	Policy; Speechwriting	January 20, 2017	January 20, 2021	Republican	Donald Trump (2017–2021)	
Ivanka Trump	Ivanka Trump (born 1981)	Women's Issues; Workforce Development; Entrepreneurship	March 29, 2017	January 20, 2021	Republican	Donald Trump (2017–2021)	(Note: President Trump's daughter Ivanka Trump was sometimes called a 'Senior Advisor to the President' (or sometimes a 'senior advisor to the President', without the upper case 'S' and 'A') by unofficial sources, even though that was actually the title of her husband Jared Kushner, while her own title was 'Advisor to the President'.)
Kevin Hassett	Kevin Hassett (born 1962)	Economic Issues	April 15, 2020	July 1, 2020	Republican	Donald Trump (2017–2021)	
Eric Herschmann	Eric Herschmann (born 1962)	Opposition research Legal issues	August 3, 2020	January 20, 2021	Republican	Donald Trump (2017–2021)	
	Mike Donilon (born 1958)	Chief Strategist	January 20, 2021	January 23, 2024	Democratic	Joe Biden (2021–2025)	
	Anita Dunn (born 1958)	Communications	January 20, 2021	August 12, 2021	Democratic	Joe Biden (2021–2025)	
	Anita Dunn (born 1958)	Communications	May 5, 2022	July 31, 2024	Democratic	Joe Biden (2021–2025)	
	Cedric Richmond (born 1973)	Public Engagement (Note: Concurrently served as the Director of the Office of Public Engagement)	January 20, 2021	May 18, 2022	Democratic	Joe Biden (2021–2025)	
	Gene Sperling (born 1958)	COVID-19 Relief; American Rescue Plan	March 15, 2021	August 2024	Democratic	Joe Biden (2021–2025)	
	Neera Tanden (born 1970)	Healthcare Policy; United States Digital Service	May 17, 2021	May 26, 2023	Democratic	Joe Biden (2021–2025)	(Note: Concurrently served as White House Staff Secretary)
	Mitch Landrieu (born 1960)	Infrastructure Implementation Coordination	November 15, 2021	January 8, 2024	Democratic	Joe Biden (2021–2025)	
	Julie Chávez Rodriguez (born 1978)	Intergovernmental Affairs (Note: Concurrently served as the Director of the Office of Intergovernmental Affairs)	June 15, 2022	May 16, 2023	Democratic	Joe Biden (2021–2025)	
	Keisha Lance Bottoms (born 1970)	Public Engagement	July 1, 2022	March 31, 2023	Democratic	Joe Biden (2021–2025)	
	John Podesta (born 1949)	Clean Energy Innovation and Implementation; International Climate Policy Advisor	September 2, 2022	January 20, 2025	Democratic	Joe Biden (2021–2025)	
	Steve Benjamin (born 1969)	Public Engagement	April 1, 2023	January 20, 2025	Democratic	Joe Biden (2021–2025)	
	Tom Perez (born 1961)	Intergovernmental Affairs	June 12, 2023	January 20, 2025	Democratic	Joe Biden (2021–2025)	
	Annie Tomasini	White House Deputy Chief of Staff for Operations	June 2023	January 20, 2025	Democratic	Joe Biden (2021–2025)	
	Ben LaBolt (born 1981)	Communications	August 8, 2024	January 20, 2025	Democratic	Joe Biden (2021–2025)	
	Karine Jean-Pierre (born 1974)	Press Secretary	October 7, 2024	January 20, 2025	Democratic	Joe Biden (2021–2025)	
	Massad Boulos (born 1971)	Arab, Middle Eastern, and African Affairs	January 20, 2025	present	Republican	Donald Trump (2025–present)	
	Elon Musk (born 1971)	Government Efficiency	January 20, 2025	May 30, 2025	Independent	Donald Trump (2025–present)	(Note: Ceased working at White House on April 30, 2025 Left position on May 30, 2025.)

== See also ==
- Counselor to the President
- Senior advisor
