= David Plouffe =

American political and business strategist (born 1967)

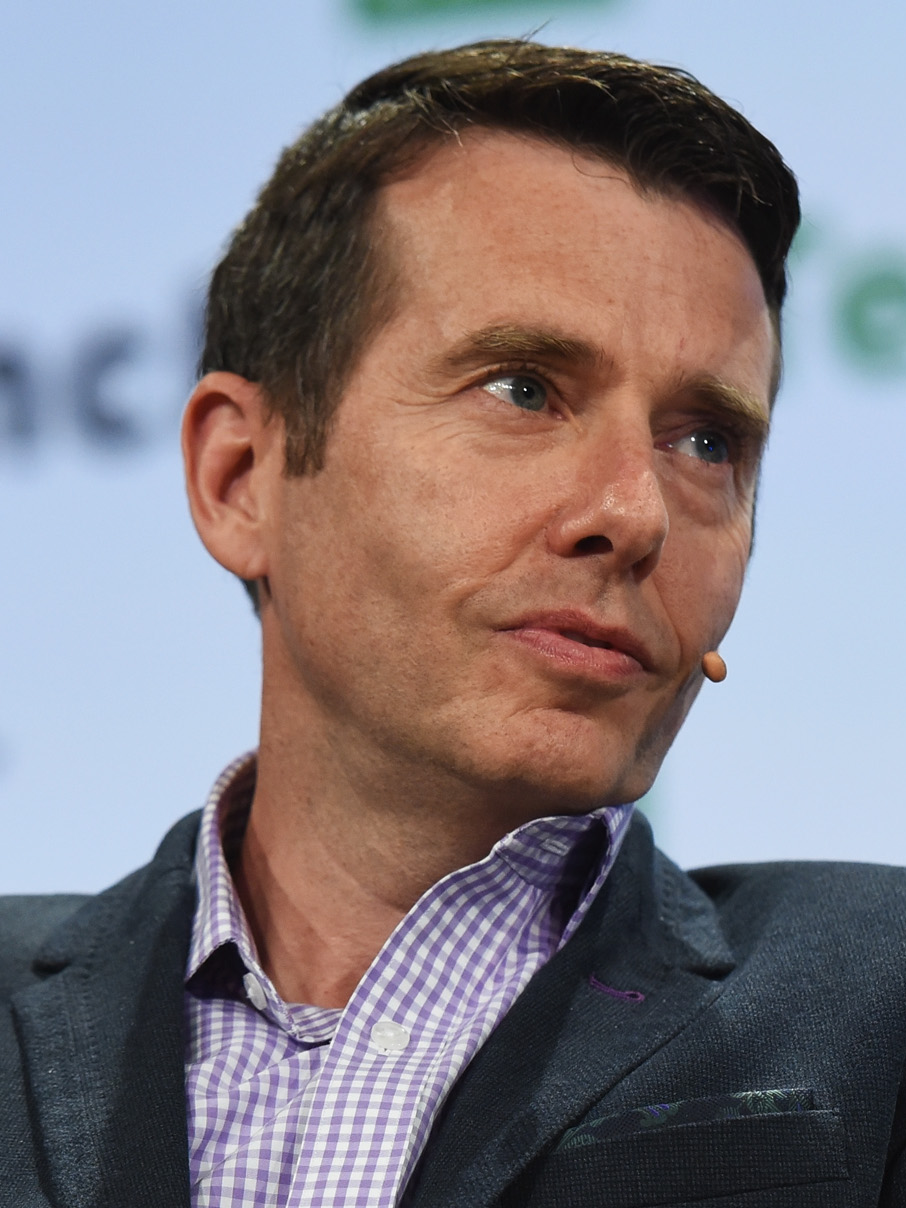
- Plouffe in 2016

Senior Advisor to the President
- In office January 10, 2011 – January 25, 2013
- President: Barack Obama
- Preceded by: David Axelrod
- Succeeded by: Dan Pfeiffer

Personal details
- Born: May 27, 1967 (age 59) Wilmington, Delaware, U.S.
- Party: Democratic
- Spouse: Olivia Morgan
- Children: 2
- Education: University of Delaware (BA)

David Plouffe (/ˈplʌf/; born May 27, 1967) is an American political and business strategist best known as the campaign manager for Barack Obama's successful 2008 presidential campaign. He was the senior advisor to Kamala Harris's 2024 presidential campaign. A long-time Democratic Party campaign consultant, he was a partner at the party-aligned campaign consulting firm AKPD Message and Media, which he joined in 2000.

Plouffe was an outside senior advisor to Obama since the president's first day in office. In 2011, he was appointed to a White House role as a senior advisor to the President following the resignation of David Axelrod, who went on to start Obama's reelection campaign. In September 2014, Plouffe became the Senior Vice President of Policy and Strategy for Uber. In May 2015, he became a full-time strategic adviser for Uber.

In January 2017, Plouffe joined the Chan Zuckerberg Initiative to lead its policy and advocacy efforts. In 2019, Politico reported he had joined the board of directors of liberal nonprofit ACRONYM, where he would advise an anti-Trump digital campaign.

== Early life ==
Plouffe was born and raised in Wilmington, Delaware. He is from a working-class Roman Catholic family (he is now a practicing Episcopalian), the son of Frances (née Vincent), a stay-at-home mother, and James Everett "Jim" Plouffe, a factory worker who later worked in marketing.

Plouffe attended St. Mark's High School. He left the University of Delaware prior to graduation in 1989 to pursue a full-time career in politics and he completed his full undergraduate degree in May 2010.

== Career ==
Plouffe began his political career by working for Senator Tom Harkin's 1990 re-election campaign. He later worked as a state field director for Harkin's unsuccessful 1992 presidential campaign. In the same year, he successfully managed Congressman John Olver's first re-election bid in Massachusetts. In 1994, Plouffe managed Delaware Attorney General Charles M. Oberly's unsuccessful campaign against Senator William V. Roth.

=== 2008 Barack Obama presidential campaign ===
Plouffe was the campaign manager for Barack Obama's successful 2008 presidential campaign. He is credited with the campaign's overall strategy in the race (primarily against then-Senator Hillary Clinton) for the Democratic Party presidential nomination, to focus on the first caucus in Iowa and on maximizing the number of pledged delegates, as opposed to focusing on states with primaries and the overall popular vote. He is also credited by The New Republic for Obama's success in the Iowa caucus and for crafting an overall strategy to prolong the primary past Super Tuesday. The Chicago Tribune wrote "Plouffe was the mastermind behind a winning strategy that looked well past Super Tuesday's contests on Feb. 5 and placed value on large and small states". Plouffe also maintained discipline over communications, including controlling leaks and releasing information about the campaign on its terms. Personally averse to publicity, Plouffe's control over the internal workings of the campaign avoided the publicly aired squabbles that tend to trouble campaigns.

In June 2008, when then-Senator Obama clinched the Democratic Party nomination, he thanked Plouffe for being the one "who never gets any credit, but has built the best political campaign, I think, in the history of the United States". In May 2008, David Axelrod praised Plouffe, stating he had "done the most magnificent job of managing a campaign that I've seen in my life of watching presidential politics. To start something like this from scratch and build what we have built was a truly remarkable thing".

After winning the election on November 4, Obama credited Plouffe in his acceptance speech, calling him "the unsung hero of this campaign, who built the...best political campaign, I think, in the history of the United States of America."

=== 2009–2011 ===
Plouffe began working as an outside senior advisor to the Obama administration in January 2009.

His book The Audacity to Win: The Inside Story and Lessons of Barack Obama's Historic Victory, discussing management strategies and tactics that he used in the 2008 campaign, was published on November 3, 2009, and became a New York Times bestseller. He later issued a video challenge for Obama supporters to buy a copy of his book on December 8, 2009, to "Beat Sarah Palin" and her bestselling book for one day.

Plouffe signed with the Washington Speakers Bureau to give paid speeches and plans to engage in non-government consulting work.

In May 2009, Plouffe delivered the convocation address at Cornell University.

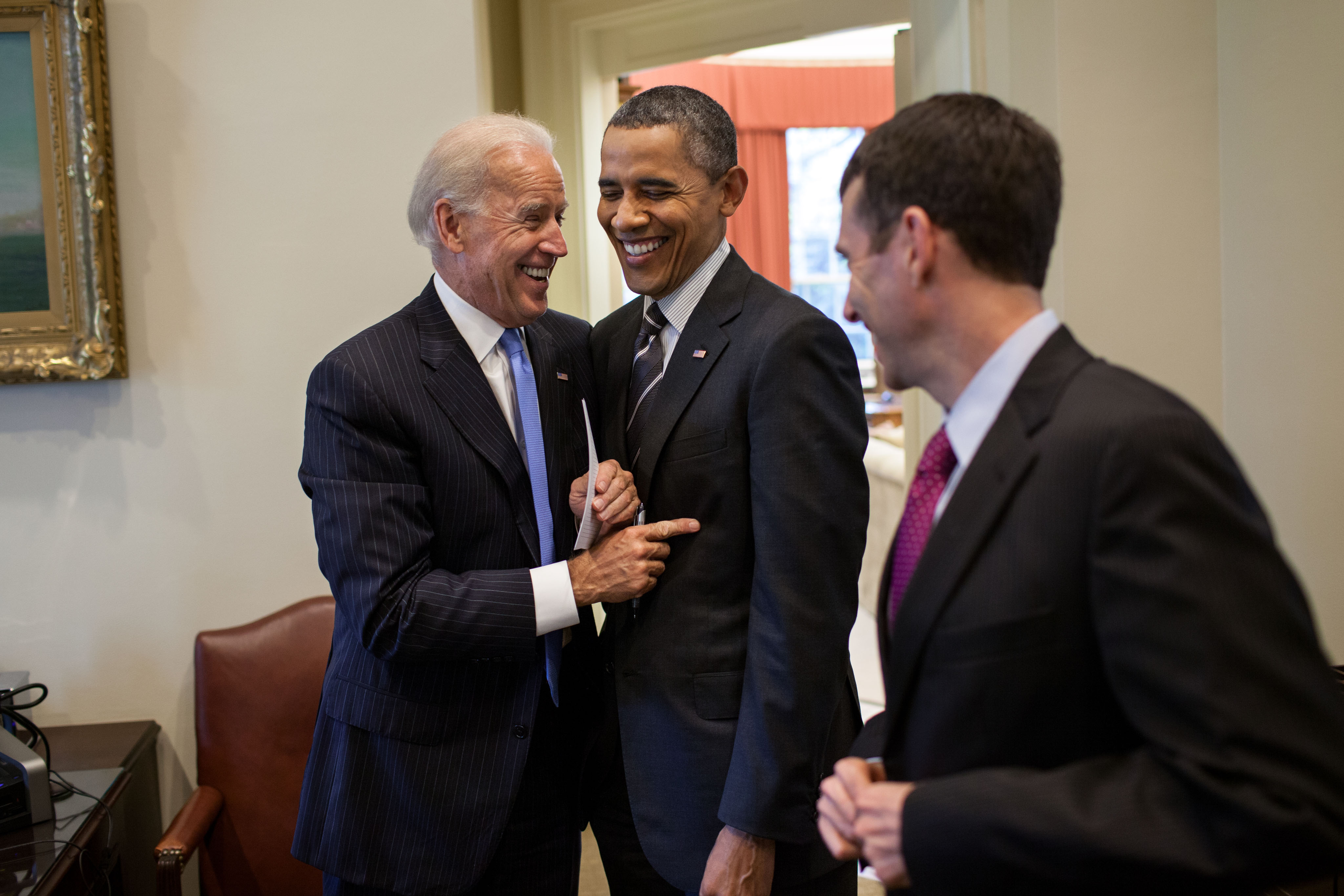
Plouffe with President Obama and Vice President Biden, 2012.

=== 2011–2013: Senior Advisor to President Obama ===
In January 2011, Plouffe joined the White House as Assistant to the President and Senior Advisor. Plouffe replaced David Axelrod as Senior Advisor when Axelrod returned to Chicago to help run President Obama's 2012 re-election campaign.

In his role as senior advisor, Plouffe led the crafting of White House strategy and communicating the president's message. He attended the president on his domestic and overseas visits, including the May 2011 state visit to the UK.

After a successful reelection and inauguration of President Obama, Plouffe departed the White House in January 2013. During a national news event, on his final day in the White House, Plouffe was singled out by the president saying, "What people don't always realize, because he doesn't like to show it, is the reason he does this stuff is because he cares deeply about people. And he cares about justice, and he cares about making sure that everybody gets a shot in life. And, those values have motivated him to do incredible things, and were it not for him, we would not have been as effective a White House and I probably wouldn't be here."

=== Post-White House career ===
After leaving the White House in early 2013, Plouffe became a contributor for Bloomberg TV and ABC News.

In April 2013, Plouffe was inducted into the American Association of Political Consultants Hall of Fame.

Plouffe met with Hillary Clinton in mid-2013 to help out in her campaign for president, having claimed that Clinton approached him first. In September 2015, Plouffe reportedly played a key role in convincing Vice President Joe Biden not to challenge Clinton, telling Biden "not to end his career in embarrassment with a third place finish in Iowa", according to multiple accounts of the meeting.

In the summer of 2014, rumors circulated that Plouffe might return to the White House as Chief of Staff. On August 5, 2014, Plouffe denied he planned to return at a Politico Playbook lunch, and White House Press Secretary Josh Earnest said he did not expect Chief of Staff Denis McDonough to depart.

On August 19, 2014, Plouffe was appointed as Senior Vice President of Policy and Strategy at Uber. The company had just raised $18.2 billion in its most recent funding round. Uber at the time was facing heavy regulatory hurdles and the hiring of Plouffe was seen as a way for the company to get these regulations lifted.

In 2016, Plouffe appeared on Race for the White House in the episode about the 1948 United States presidential election.

In January 2017, Plouffe was hired by Mark Zuckerberg to lead policy and advocacy at the Chan Zuckerberg Initiative. He led a bipartisan policy board alongside Ken Mehlman where they announced policy members and worked to find opportunities to work with the government.

In September 2019, Plouffe was invited to join the board of directors of ACRONYM, a liberal nonprofit group focused on digital messaging, by CEO Tara McGowan. He advises program work at ACRONYM and bolsters the organization's fundraising efforts.

Plouffe hosts a podcast, Campaign HQ with David Plouffe, which is a partnership with Cadence13.

In August 2024, Plouffe joined the Kamala Harris presidential campaign as a senior advisor.

In June 2025, Plouffe joined the global advisory council of Coinbase, a US-based cryptocurrency exchange.

== Controversy ==
Plouffe has drawn criticism for his paid speaking engagements abroad while on hiatus from advising Obama. In early 2009, Plouffe spoke in Baku, Azerbaijan, for $50,000. The event's sponsor had ties to Azerbaijan's authoritarian government. Following complaints from human rights groups, Plouffe donated his speaking fees to the National Democratic Institute.

In December 2010, Plouffe received $100,000 for two speeches in Nigeria from an affiliate of the South African telecommunications company MTN Group. At the time, MTN had been doing business with the government of Iran since 2005. MTN later came under increased scrutiny by the United States due to allegations that the Iranian government used the MTN network to track and monitor dissidents. MTN has been listed on the "Iran Business Registry" of watchdog group United Against Nuclear Iran since 2009. White House spokesman Eric Schultz stated that Plouffe had only spoken to the group about digital communications and cellular technology, and had declined to meet with the company's leadership. Schultz also said the criticism of Plouffe's speeches before he joined the White House was "misplaced."

In 2013, in response to accusations from Congressman Darrell Issa (R-CA) that the Obama administration knew about the IRS targeting of not-for-profit conservative groups for extra scrutiny, Plouffe tweeted: "Strong words from Mr Grand Theft Auto and suspected arsonist/insurance swindler. And loose ethically today", referring to two incidents in Issa's past. In 1972, while a teenager, Issa was accused of stealing a Maserati sports car; the charges were later dropped. In 1982, a Cleveland warehouse belonging to Issa burned to the ground. The fire was ruled suspicious and Issa collected an insurance payout, but he was not charged with any crime.

In February 2017, Plouffe was fined $90,000 by the Chicago Board of Ethics for the violation of ethics rules when he failed to register as a lobbyist after contacting Chicago Mayor Rahm Emanuel to help Uber with regulations for picking up travelers at Chicago airports. The board fined Uber $2,000 as well for hiring a lobbyist who violated the city's lobbying laws.

== Works ==
- Plouffe, David. The Audacity to Win: The Inside Story and Lessons of Barack Obama's Historic Victory, Viking Adult (November 3, 2009); ISBN 978-0-670-02133-8
- A Citizen's Guide to Beating Donald Trump

== Personal life ==
Plouffe is married to Olivia Morgan, a senior advisor to Maria Shriver's A Woman's Nation, a member of Obama's President's Committee on the Arts and Humanities, and Director of Federal Relations to then California Governor Gray Davis. The couple resides in San Francisco, and has two children.

== See also ==
- List of Barack Obama 2008 presidential campaign staff members
- Organizing for America

Political offices
Preceded by David Axelrod	Senior Advisor to the President; 2011–2013; Served alongside: Valerie Jarrett	Succeeded by Dan Pfeiffer
