= Eric Sedler =

American public relations executive and political strategist

- Born: 1968 (age 57–58); Lexington, Kentucky, United States
- Education: University of Illinois Chicago
- Occupation: Public relations executive
- Known for: Co-founder of Avoq
- Title: Managing Partner of Avoq
- Spouse: Marla Sedler
- Children: 2
- Parent(s): Robert Sedler, Rozanne Sedler

Eric Sedler (born 1968) is an American public relations executive and political strategist based in Chicago. He is a co-founder and managing partner of Avoq, a national advocacy and strategic communications firm formed in 2024. He previously served as the founder and CEO of Kivvit.

== Early life and education ==
Sedler was born in 1968 and raised in suburban Detroit, Michigan. He graduated from the University of Illinois Chicago.

His father, Robert Sedler, was a professor of constitutional law at Wayne State University Law School. His mother, Rozanne Sedler, was a social worker.

== Career ==
=== Early career ===
Before entering the private sector, Sedler spent nearly a decade in government and politics working for government officials and candidates including US Senators and on the staff of the Illinois House Democratic leadership.

=== ASGK and Kivvit ===
In 2002, Sedler co-founded ASGK Public Strategies alongside political strategist David Axelrod.

In 2009, following Axelrod's appointment as Senior Advisor to then US President Barack Obama, Sedler and partner John Kupper purchased Axelrod’s share of the firm.

In 2015, ASGK Public Strategies merged with its subsidiary, M Public Affairs, to form Kivvit.

In 2023, Kivvit was acquired by the private equity firm Coral Tree Partners.

=== Avoq ===
In early 2024, Kivvit merged with the agency Subject Matter, which was also owned by Coral Tree Partners, to form Avoq. Avoq is an integrated communications and government relations firm with offices in Chicago, Los Angeles, New Jersey, New York and Washington DC. Sedler currently serves as a Managing Partner at Avoq, focusing on strategic communications, crisis management, and public affairs for corporate and non-profit clients.

== Board and Governance ==
In 2024, Sedler was appointed to the board of directors of World Business Chicago, the city's public-private economic development agency. During a leadership transition in early 2024, he also served as the agency’s interim CEO.

He also serves on the board of the Jewish United Fund of Chicago.

== Personal life ==
Sedler resides in Chicago with his wife, Marla. They have two adult children.
