= Evan Bayh 2008 presidential campaign =

2008 presidential campaign of Evan Bayh

Friends of Evan Bayh
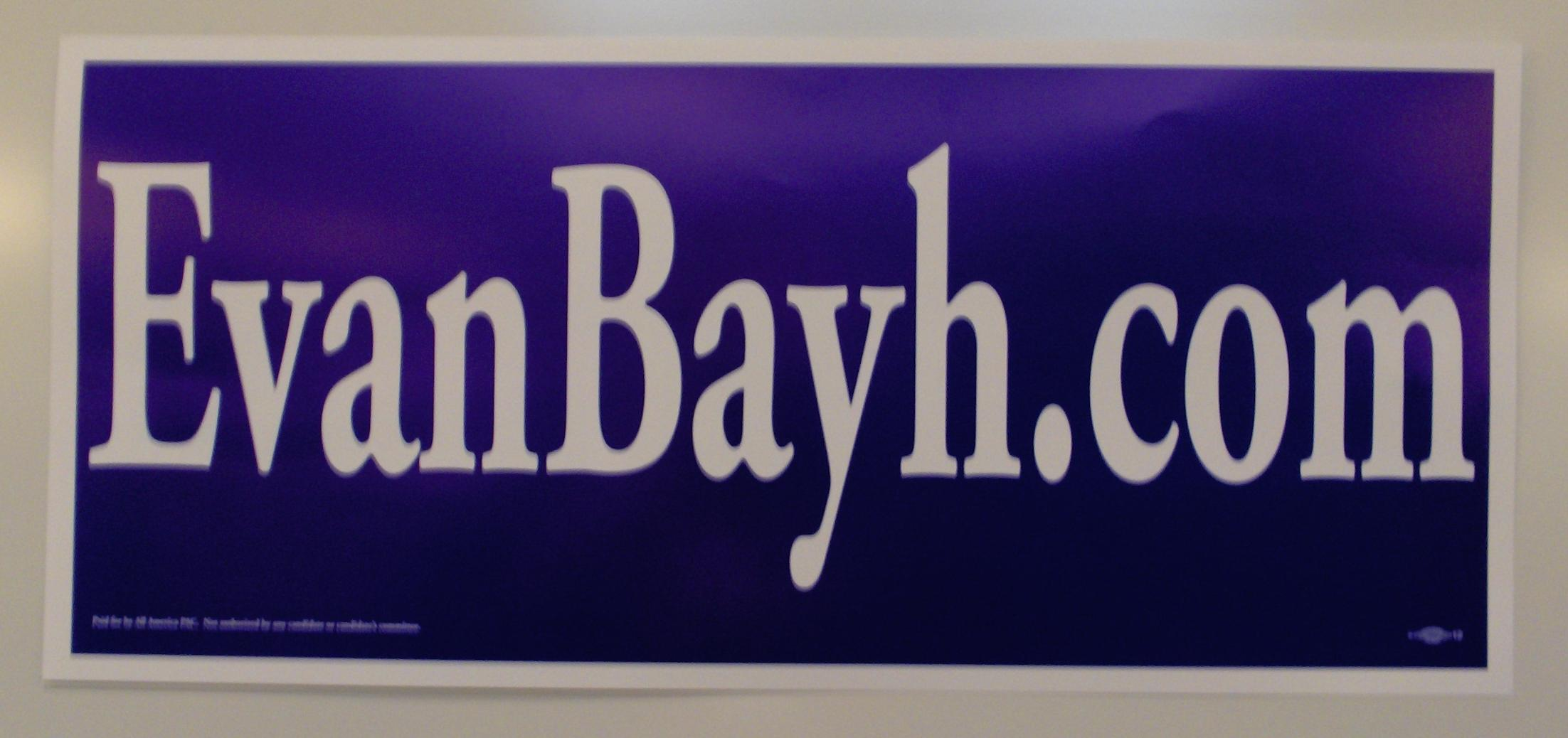
- Campaign: U.S. presidential election, 2008
- Candidate: Evan Bayh; Governor of Indiana (1989–1997); U.S. Senator of Indiana (1999–2011)
- Affiliation: Democratic Party
- Headquarters: Washington, DC
- Key people: Anita Dunn, Thurgood Marshall Jr., David Holtzman, Nancy Jacobson, Dan Pfeiffer, Marc Farinella, Barry Wagman
- Receipts: US$0 (2007-01-31)

Website
- evanbayh.com (archived - December 5th, 2006)

The 2008 presidential campaign of Evan Bayh, Democratic Senator and 46th Governor of Indiana, began shortly after the 2004 presidential election.

Although he was frequently mentioned as a possible challenger to frontrunner Hillary Clinton due to his status as a Senator from a traditionally red state who could appeal to moderates in a general election, Bayh stopped short of a full-fledged candidacy, withdrawing from the race in December 2006 despite accumulating approximately $10.4 million for the campaign. His withdrawal was tied to his public image, which characterized the candidate as "dependable" but "dull".

Bayh spent a considerable amount of time campaigning throughout the early primary states (particularly Iowa and New Hampshire) for most of 2005 and 2006. The staff from his All America Political Action Committee (PAC) worked as his campaign team.

Two weeks prior to his withdrawal, Bayh filed his organization with the Federal Election Commission as an exploratory committee, under the header Friends of Evan Bayh. Following his exit from the race, Bayh endorsed and campaigned for Hillary Clinton for president, switching his support to Democratic nominee Barack Obama following Clinton's withdrawal. He was a finalist to become Obama's running mate, losing, in a close decision, to Delaware Senator Joe Biden.

== Early stages ==
Following the re-election of President George W. Bush and Bayh's re-election as a Senator from Indiana, Bayh considered the possibility of running for president in 2008. Although Bush carried Bayh's home state by 20 points, Bayh won 61% of the vote, solidifying the Senator's appeal to moderate and Republican voters. After serving four years as the chair of the Democratic Leadership Council, Bayh hoped to even further demonstrate his position as a moderate by helping to found the Third Way Political Action Committee in January 2005.

As word increased of Bayh's intentions, political scientists opined on the detractions of a run. Citing the fact that his eight years as governor may be nullified by its distance in time and that his visibility in the Senate was low, critics pondered whether moderate voters may be more inclined to line with possible candidate Mark Warner of Virginia. However, this criticism subsided once Warner decided against a run in October 2006.

== On the campaign trail ==
=== 2005 ===
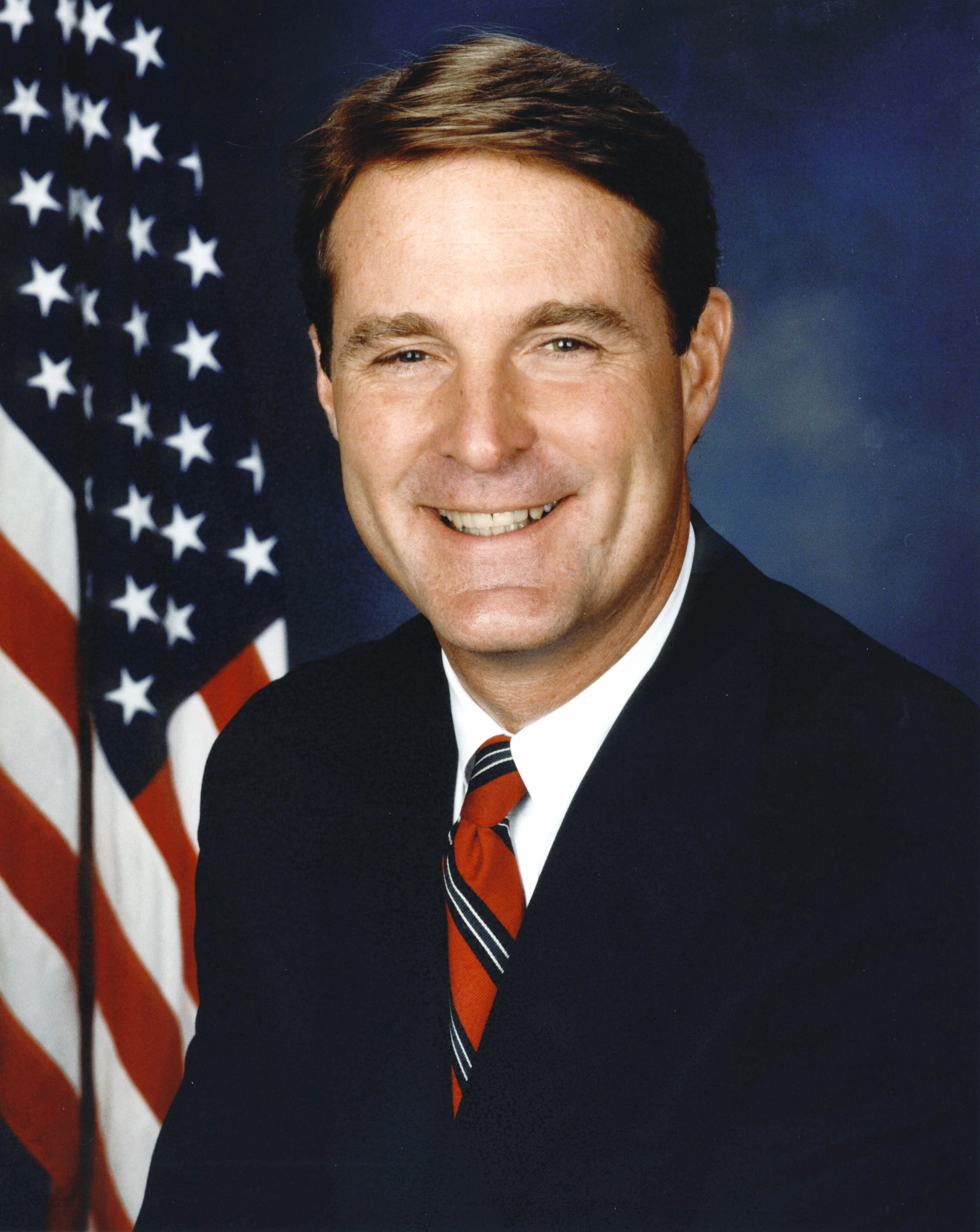
Official Senate portrait of Bayh

Bayh traveled to the first primary state of New Hampshire on July 10, 2005, on his first campaign trip since the 2004 election. He held a "meet and greet" at Democratic headquarters in Manchester, and visited Concord the following day to meet with Governor John Lynch and environmental leaders. The next month he traveled to the first caucus state of Iowa, meeting with Congressman Leonard Boswell to discuss methamphetamine use. He also attended party fundraisers and met with activists during his three-day stay. While in Des Moines, Bayh stated that Democrats must gain credibility on national security, and commented that he would begin a full-fledged presidential campaign if he felt he had the means to win the Democratic nomination. Throughout the month, he visited Iowa and reflected similar rhetoric to the 2004 Kerry campaign, advocating energy independence, fair trade, lowering the federal deficit and an improved handling of the war in Iraq. He explained to reporters that his visits to Iowa were "the beginning of a longer conversation".

The following month, Bayh decided to vote against the confirmation of John Roberts as Chief Justice of the United States. This move was judged by some political commentators as "posturing" for the 2008 race. Detractors stated that Bayh voted against the judge to appeal to the liberals of the party, as other possible candidates voted in a similar manner. The next month, Bayh attended the annual Jefferson-Jackson dinner in New Hampshire. At the event he accused President Bush of dividing the nation and stated that he believed Democrats could win in red states (traditional Republican states) if they stood up for "American values".

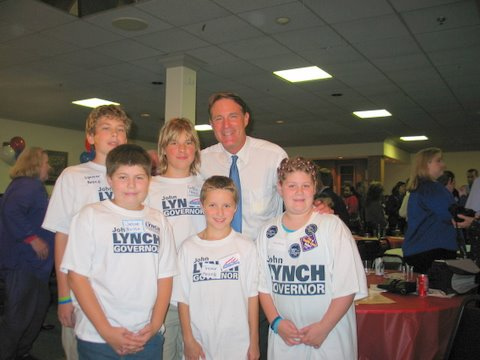
Bayh posing with a group of children in New Hampshire while making an appearance on behalf of John Lynch's gubernatorial campaign

Bayh continued to campaign in Iowa and New Hampshire as November 2005 approached. Media outlets reported that 10 potential presidential candidates had visited Iowa in October. When asked about the attention given to the state 26 months prior to the caucus, Bayh replied that he "wish[ed] the process didn't begin this early, but it does". Later in the month, former chief counsel and master political strategist for Bayh, Federal District Judge David Hamilton ruled that prayer could not be conducted prior to the opening of the state legislature in Indiana, reasoning that the mention of "Jesus Christ" as "Savior" or "Son of God" is unconstitutional. Commentators argued that the decision diminished Bayh's label as the "centrist candidate" for the Democratic nomination due to his connections to the judge.

It was revealed in December 2005 that Bayh had raised $1.2 million in the first two quarters of 2005, more than any other potential candidate with the exception of Senator Bill Frist of Tennessee. But the cash did not translate into high marks among possible voters as a CNN poll conducted December 9–11 found that Bayh had the support of only 1% of self-identified Democrats, placing him seventh among possible candidates. Later in the month, Bayh was criticized by the video game industry for political posturing in his quest along with Senator Hillary Clinton to crack down on explicit content in video games. The manufacturers claimed that the movements were simply attempts to increase his appeal to values voters for his presidential run.

=== 2006 ===
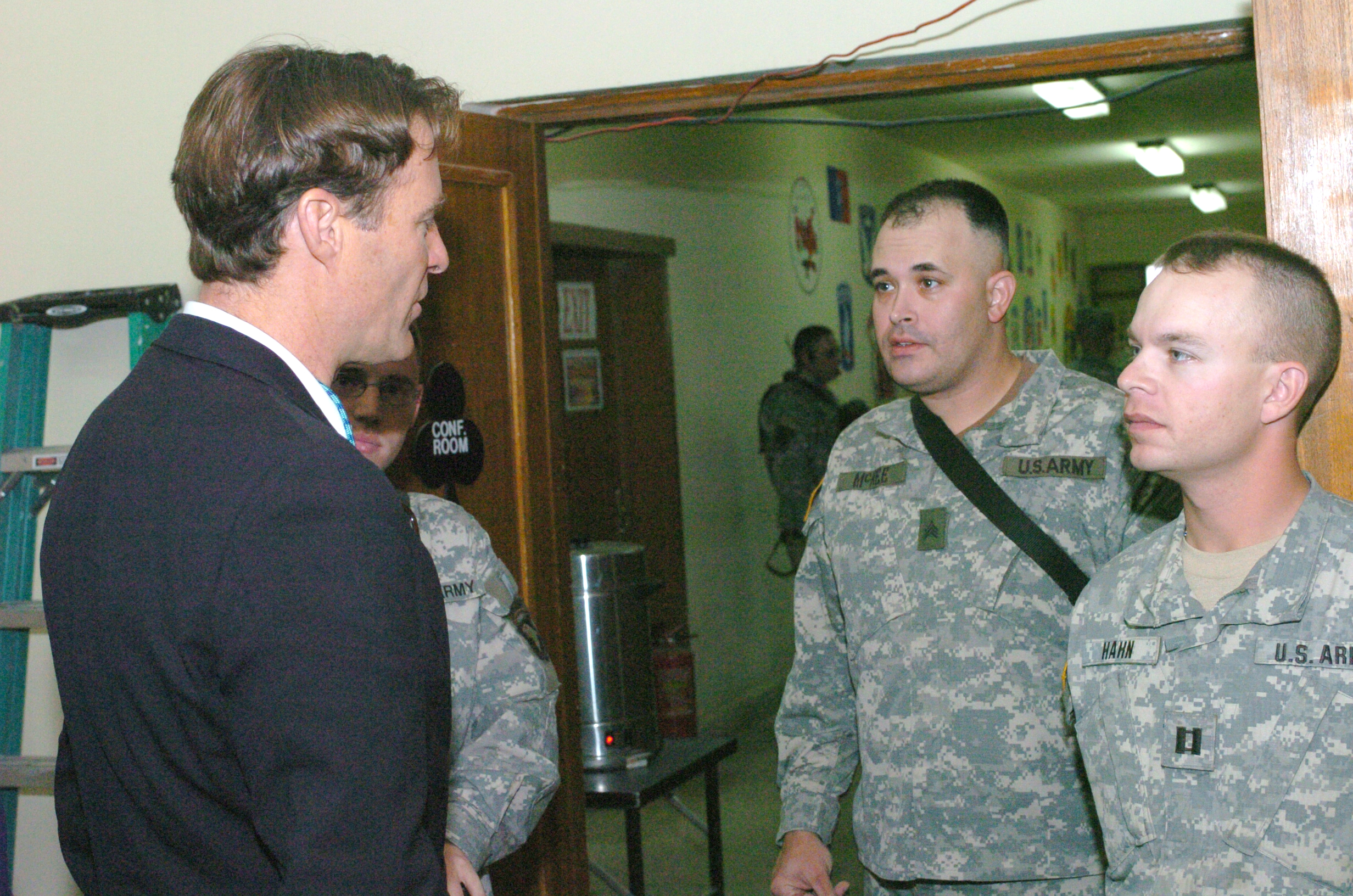
Bayh during a January 2006 trip to Iraq

As 2006 began, Bayh had $9.5 million on hand, $3.1 million of which he had raised the previous year. A large portion of his time in the first month was spent positioning himself. He took a hard-line against the government of Iran, referring to leader Mahmoud Ahmadinejad as having a "radical, almost delusional nature," and then criticized the Bush administration for "ignoring" the situation, stating that "diplomacy, economic sanctions, [and] other means" needed to be used. For balance, just as he had in the previous year, Bayh voted against the appointment of a George W. Bush Supreme Court nominee when he cast his "no" vote for Samuel Alito. However, his fellow potential Democratic presidential peers, voted in a similar fashion. Late in January, Bayh gained the position as speaker at the Jefferson-Jackson dinner in North Carolina for the upcoming April. The gain came as a loss for North Carolinian John Edwards, who also was considered a potential candidate for the Democratic nomination. A Bayh spokesman, commented that the Senator was chosen because he "has a lot of ideas about how to fix Washington and make America better". Prior to the event, in the beginning of February, Bayh made an appearance at the Congressional Black Caucus political action committee, spoke to the United Auto Workers conference, and made a trip back to Iowa for a plethora of events during the February 11–13 weekend. By the end of the month and into March, Bayh criticized the Bush administration from the right, attempting to appeal to all segments of the political spectrum by speaking out against the plan to sell American ports to United Arab Emirates companies.

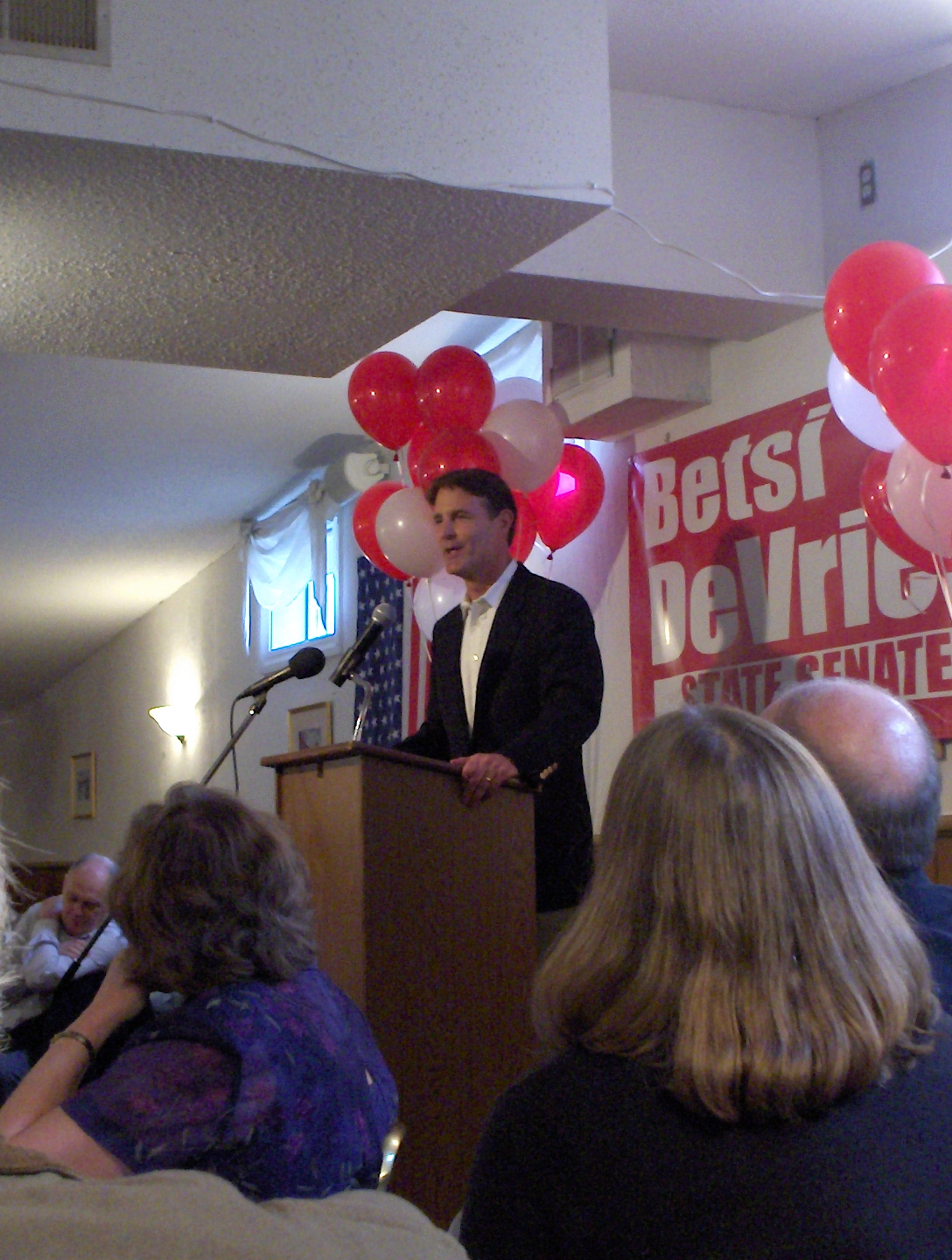
Bayh campaigns for New Hampshire State Representative Betsi DeVries' State Senate campaign in March 2006

March for Bayh began with reports that the potential candidate was one of the most conservative Democrats of the Senate. However, it was later revealed that he was the 19th most conservative Democrat during the 109th Congress, demonstrating a sharp trend to the left during his run. This came as the Senator made the keynote speech at the American Israel Public Affairs Committee, where according to a campaign aide, he "la[id] out a tough and smart approach to deal with Iran and Hamas". While on a campaign stop in Manchester late in March, Bayh revealed to a New Hampshire crowd that he supported the continuation of the New Hampshire Primary as the first in the nation and that he would "do everything" he could "to keep it that way".

Bayh headlined the Jefferson-Jackson dinner for Michigan in the first week of April, and made rounds on political talk shows throughout the month. He weighed in on the immigration debate, stating that the government should come up with a solution "without rewarding [and] violating the law, to bring [illegal immigrants] out of the shadows" and to "impose fines, [perform] criminal background checks" while making sure the immigrants "pay back taxes [and] learn English." He elaborated that it was in America's "national security interest" to give the immigrants "some kind of regular status here." Later in the month, he traveled to North Carolina to deliver the keynote address at the Jefferson-Jackson dinner, just as he planned earlier in the year.

Bayh continued campaigning in Iowa during May, making appearances in Osceola, Council Bluffs, and Sioux City. But polls of Iowa in June showed that the candidate had only single digit support. In an attempt to improve his standing on the unpopular war in Iraq, Bayh along with many of his fellow potential Democratic presidential candidates, voted for a resolution that would set July 2007 as the deadline to remove American forces from the nation. At the end of the month, Bayh traveled to Slidell, Louisiana to view the damage brought about by Hurricane Katrina the previous year. Stating that he "just want[ed] to help," Bayh became the first member of Congress outside of Louisiana to visit the site. On a larger scale, Bayh commented on the rebuilding of the area, conveying that it "is a test of America".

While campaigning in Des Moines during the first week of July, Bayh commented that he would campaign for embattled Senator Joe Lieberman in his Connecticut primary fight against Ned Lamont if asked to do so, but stopped short of proclaiming support for the candidate if he lost the primary and decided to run as an independent. As he completed his fifth trip to Iowa, party officials in the state remarked that he was "making inroads" in the state, commenting that "Democrats are looking for somebody who is new and fresh." The candidate revealed his economic goals during a speech, stating "that creating opportunity for middle-class Americans will be a centerpiece of my campaign." He then listed his objectives including: tax credits to pay for college tuition of low to mid-level income Americans, covering insurance costs of small businesses for its sickest employees, and incentives for saving and buying automobiles with "good gas mileage." However, in order to pay for these proposals, Bayh stated that raising taxes would be "a decision worth making".

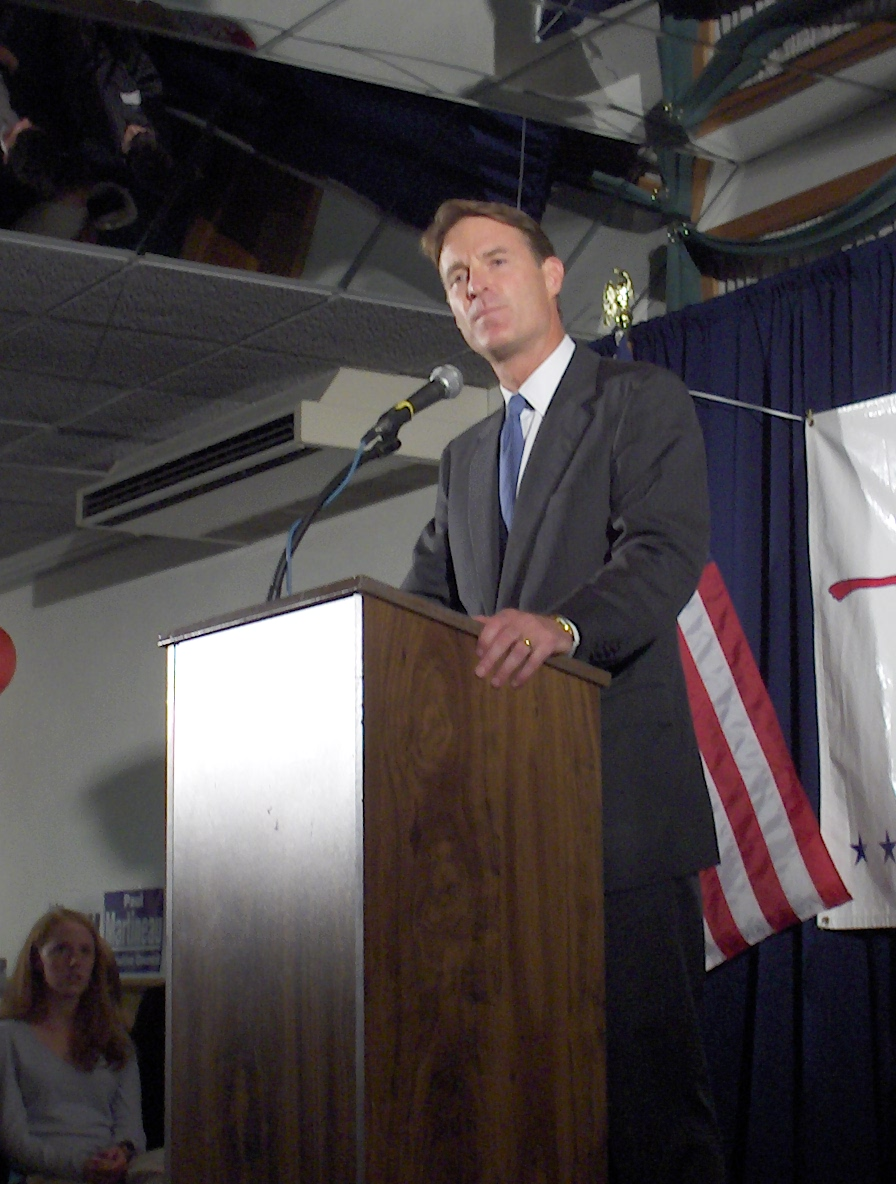
Bayh campaigns in Manchester, New Hampshire during a Democratic Party event in September 2006

In August, Bayh spread his staffers trained at "Camp Bayh" throughout the critical early primary and caucus states, sending 25 to Iowa, 15 to New Hampshire, three to Nevada, two to South Carolina, and leaving five to remain in Indiana. He returned to Iowa in mid-August, with a packed schedule that included fundraisers and a news conference for the "Wake Up Wal-Mart" organization. During the event, Bayh tried to appeal to populist voters stating that "Wal-Mart has become emblematic of the anxiety around the country, and the middle class squeeze." The next month, Bayh traveled to Iowa to speak to the United Auto Workers for a second time in 2006. During a separate trip to New Hampshire later in the month, Bayh tried to appeal to anti-war voters by remarking that the Iraq War was not a central part of the war on terrorism and that it was "taking the focus away from Afghanistan and Iran".

Following Mark Warner's withdrawal from the race in October, Bayh looked to gain the most in the field of candidates. He immediately began to call former Warner supporters, hoping they would support his campaign. During a visit to New Albany, Indiana, the candidate called for the 9/11 Commission's recommendations to be enacted. Later in the month, he made a stop in Nevada to discuss senior issues with Nevada's gubernatorial candidate Dina Titus.

The Democratic takeover of Congress during the 2006 Mid-term elections was a victory for Bayh, who had helped three Iowan congressional candidates win their races during campaigning, and whose efforts culminated in a Democratic majority in the state's legislature. In regards to the election, he stated that "we (the Democrats) won by turning the red states of the heartland blue". In mid-November, the candidate traveled to the West Coast for a fundraising tour. Late in the month, polls revealed that Bayh had a 43.3% likability rating among the American public, slightly ahead of the last placed finisher John Kerry at 39.6%.

=== Exploratory committee ===
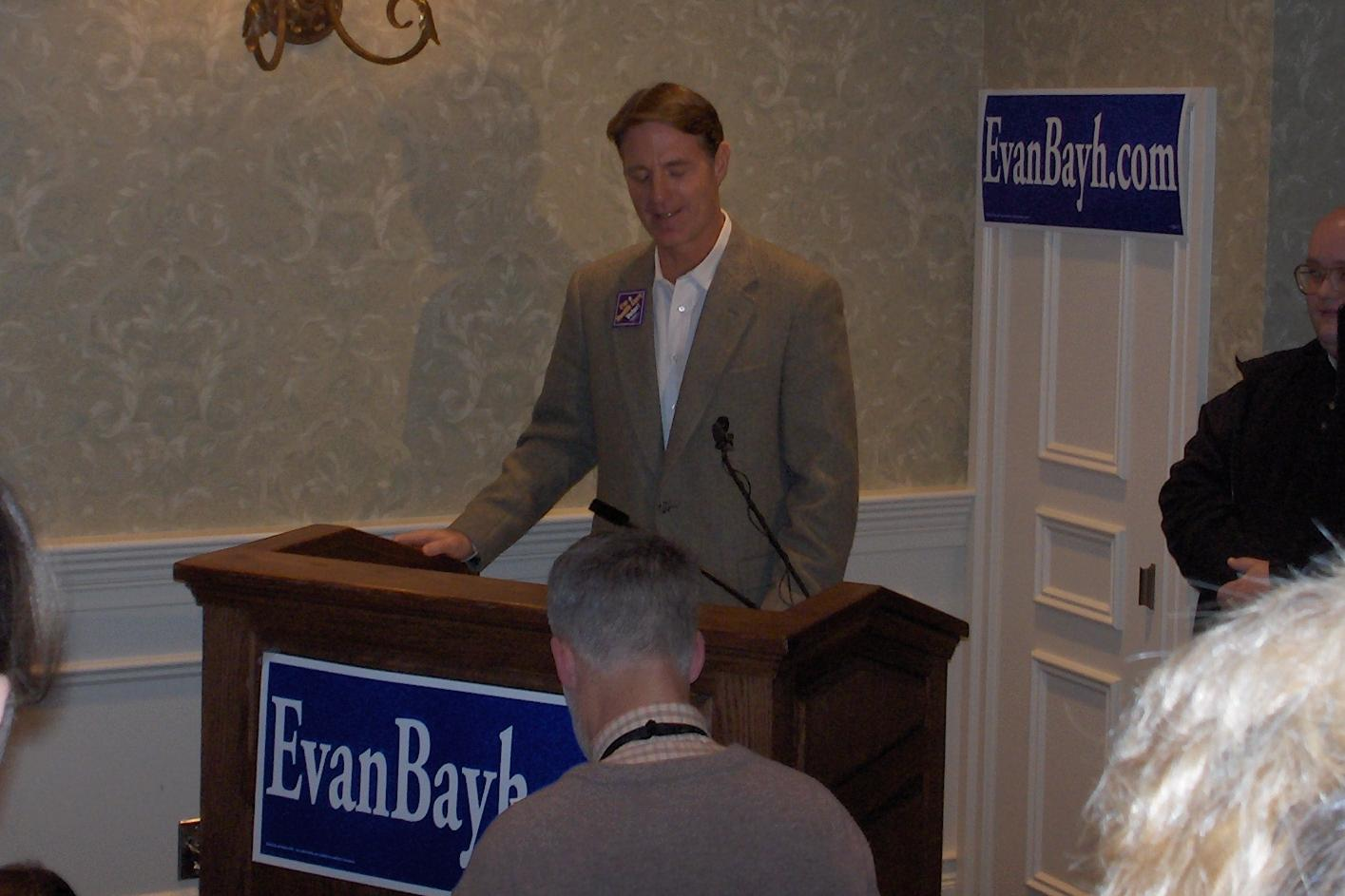
Bayh delivering his campaign stump speech in December 2006

On December 3, 2006, Bayh announced that he would form an exploratory committee in order for him to travel and raise funds more effectively for a presidential run. Upon this declaration, the candidate appeared on This Week, articulating that Americans "need someone who can deal with the dysfunction here in this city (Washington D.C.) so that our government begins to empower our people to fulfill their potential...if I can be that individual, so be it." His spokesman remarked that the committee would help "to put an infrastructure in place" for the campaign. Bayh immediately returned to the campaign trail following his announcement, traveling back to Iowa on December 4 with approximately $10.6 million to continue spreading his message. The next weekend, Bayh visited New Hampshire to discuss his views on energy independence, global warming and the war in Iraq. But due to the two sold out appearances to the state by Barack Obama, who was recently named a potential candidate, Bayh's trip did not garner much media attention.

=== Withdrawal ===
Two weeks following his announcement, Bayh withdrew from the race, citing that "the odds were longer than I felt I could responsibly pursue". He further commented that a run would cause him to be "absent from the Senate...instead of working to help the people of my state and the nation."

== Employees ==
The following individuals worked as advisors to Bayh as members of the All America PAC and at the candidate's Senate office. Media consultant Anita Dunn was slated to be given a promotion and replaced as the Friends of Evan Bayh committee was formed, but the campaign's brevity prevented any notable action. Dunn would go on to serve as President Barack Obama's interim-White House Communications Director, replaced by another Bayh campaign employee, Daniel Pfeiffer, who currently holds the post.

The campaign also featured Thurgood Marshall Jr., son of the late U.S. Supreme Court Justice Thurgood Marshall, the first African-American to serve on the court. Marshall Jr. had previously worked in the Bill Clinton administration.

All America PAC
Position	Employee	Image
Senior Advisor	Nancy Jacobson	
Senior Advisor	Thurgood Marshall Jr.	
Chief Technology Officer	David Holtzman	
Pollster	Paul Maslin	
Media Consultant	Anita Dunn	
Executive Director	Marc Farinella	
Midwest Political Director	Chris Hayler	
Northeast Political Director	Sean Downey	
Communications Director	Daniel Pfeiffer	
Chief Financial Officer	Barry E. Wagman	
Finance Director	Kory Mitchell	
Administrative Director	Tyler Bullen	
Press Writer	Jonathan Kott	
Policy Coordinator	Jennifer Linker	
Technology/Internet Operations	Chris Smith	
Online Organizer/Blogger	Ryan Alexander	

Senate Office

Position	Employee
Chief of Staff	Tom Sugar
Deputy Chief of Staff	Linda Moore Forbes

== Reaction ==
Bayh was criticized throughout his campaign for being "boring" or "dull," but media outlets also described the candidate as "folksy" and displaying a "Midwest charm," that some compared to President Harry Truman. The Washington Post commented that he was "unexciting but very dependable and electable," and that he would "have a great shot" if the Democratic Party was "feeling pragmatic". The Wall Street Journal lauded the Senator as a "genuinely fiscally conservative Democrat." His record as a governor and Senator were also portrayed as desirable assets. Pollster Frank Luntz summed up Bayh's campaign, describing the Senator from the perspective of his audience:

After seeing 20 minutes of Evan Bayh, there wasn't much love or hate...They appreciated his down-to-earth appeal, but they wanted to see more passion.

== Aftermath ==
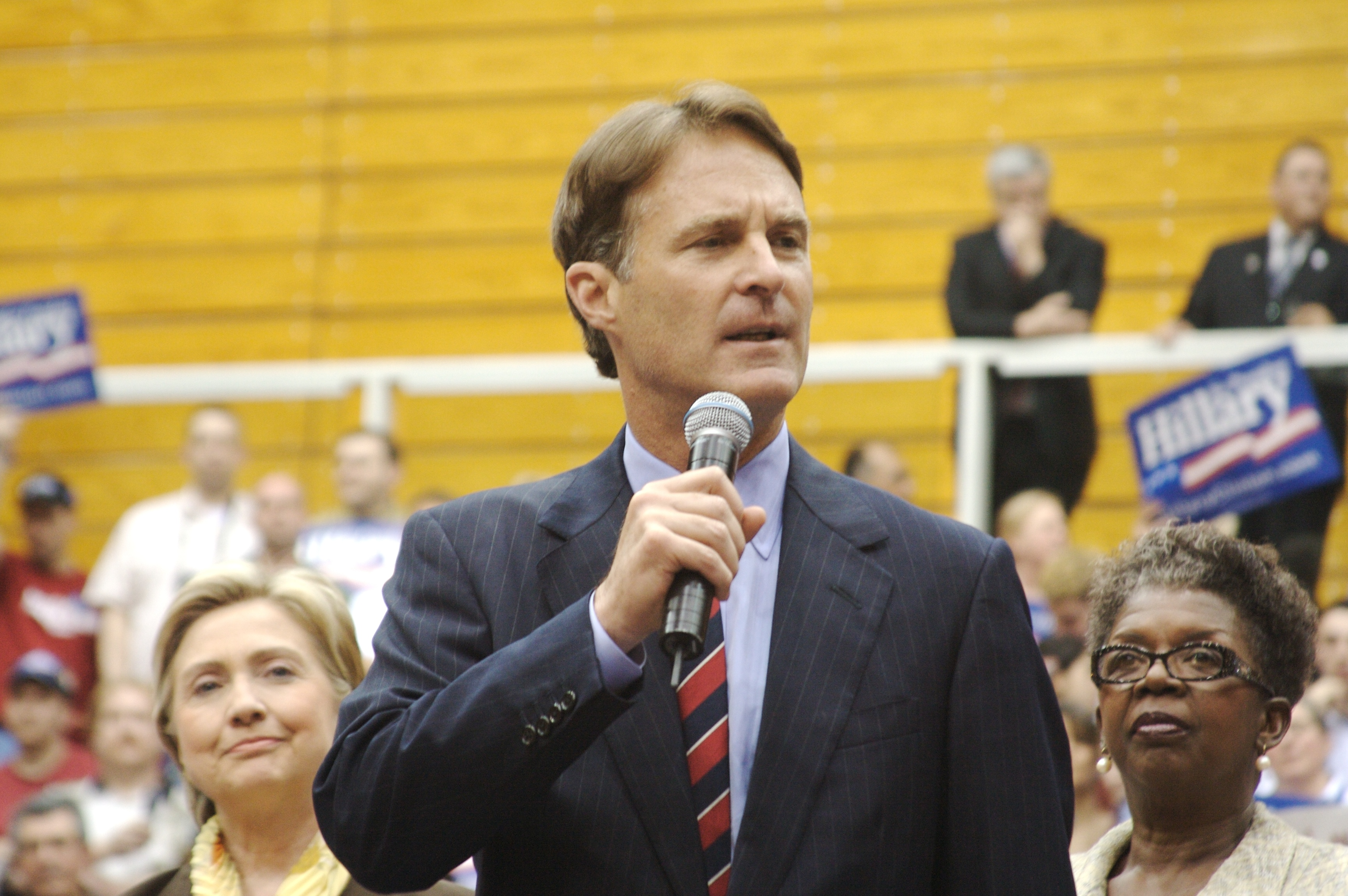
Bayh campaigning with Hillary Clinton

Nine months following his withdrawal, Bayh endorsed Senator Hillary Clinton, stating that he believed she would "run a campaign that is both tough and smart when it comes to protecting our nation's security". He campaigned with the former First Lady, sticking to her when the race tightened with the surging Senator Barack Obama.

After Obama secured the nomination, Bayh endorsed the Senator from Illinois and was mentioned as a possible running mate. He was included on the initial shortlist, which was then whittled down to four names: Bayh, Senator Joe Biden of Delaware, Governor Tim Kaine of Virginia and Governor Kathleen Sebelius of Kansas. On August 22, the eve of Obama's scheduled unveiling of his running mate, NBC News reported that Bayh and Kaine had been informed that they were not chosen. Obama opted instead for Biden. Obama's campaign manager David Plouffe later wrote in his book The Audacity to Win, which was published in November 2009, that Bayh had been a "coin toss" away from becoming Obama's running mate. Plouffe and David Axelrod had interviewed the finalists and Plouffe said that Bayh's answers were "substantively close to perfect, if cautiously so." He recalled that at the time of the interview he thought to himself, "there's no way this guy will color outside the lines... Bayh's up side and down side are probably the closest spread of the three", compared to Biden, who could "reach higher heights but could cause us real pain." As Obama approached a decision, he told Plouffe "it's a coin toss now between Bayh and Biden, but Kaine is still a distinct possibility." On August 17, Obama told Axelrod simply, "I've decided. It's Biden."

Bayh later appeared at the 2008 Democratic National Convention, delivering a speech in support of the Democratic nominee stating: "The time for change has come and Barack Obama is the change we need".
