= Future Forward =

Future Forward may refer to:

- Future Forward PAC, an American super PAC
- Future Forward Party, a Thai political party
