= Shailagh Murray =

American journalist

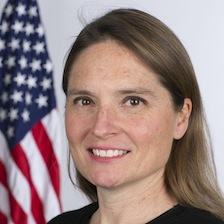

Senior Advisor to the President
- In office April 3, 2015 – January 20, 2017
- President: Barack Obama
- Preceded by: Dan Pfeiffer
- Succeeded by: Ivanka Trump; Jared Kushner; Stephen Miller; Kevin Hassett

Personal details
- Born: Shailagh Jane Murray; October 9, 1965 (age 61) Buffalo, New York, U.S.
- Party: Democratic
- Education: University of Missouri (BA); Northwestern University (MA)

Shailagh Jane Murray (born October 9, 1965) is an American university administrator, former political aide, and journalist who served as a senior advisor to U.S. President Barack Obama. She previously served as deputy chief of staff and communications director for Vice President Joe Biden.

== Education ==
Murray graduated from the University of Missouri-Columbia with a B.A. in humanities and received her M.S. from Northwestern University's School of Journalism.

== Career ==
Murray worked for The Wall Street Journal from 1999 to 2005. She then became Capitol Hill correspondent for The Washington Post, covering the elections of 2006, 2008 and 2010.

She joined the Office of the Vice President in 2011 as communications director and was later promoted to deputy chief of staff.

In March 2015, she was named as the successor to Dan Pfeiffer as senior advisor to the President with a communications portfolio.

In September 2018, she was appointed executive vice president for public affairs of Columbia University. She left the position in 2024 and joined FanDuel in July 2025 as the senior vice president of public affairs.

Political offices
Preceded by Dan Pfeiffer	Senior Advisor to the President; 2015–2017; Served alongside: Brian Deese, Valerie Jarrett	Succeeded by Jared Kushner; Stephen Miller
