= American Association of Political Consultants =

American lobbying group

- Abbreviation: AAPC
- Formation: 1969
- Fields: Organization of political consultants
- President: Kyle Roberts
- Vice President: Kelly Gibson
- Treasurer: Danielle Cendejas
- Secretary: Tracy Dietz
- Website: theaapc.org

The American Association of Political Consultants (AAPC) is an American trade association for the political consulting industry. Founded in 1969, it represents professionals involved in election campaigns, public affairs, opinion polling, political advertising, fundraising and related work. Its membership includes both Democratic and Republican consultants, as well as professionals who work outside the two major parties.

The association was founded during the growth of professional political consulting in the United States, as campaign management increasingly came to involve independent advisers specializing in polling, advertising and voter communications. Among its founders was Joseph Napolitan, a consultant who worked on the presidential campaigns of John F. Kennedy and Hubert Humphrey.

AAPC is known for its annual Pollie Awards, which recognize political advertising and campaign communications. It also maintains a code of professional ethics and has taken positions on the regulation of political advertising, automated telephone calls and the use of artificial intelligence in election campaigns.

The association has been a party to several federal lawsuits concerning political speech and government regulation. In Barr v. American Association of Political Consultants, Inc. (2020), the Supreme Court of the United States ruled that an exemption to federal restrictions on automated telephone calls violated the First Amendment, although it left the underlying restrictions in place.

== History ==
=== Founding ===
The association was established in 1969 by political consultants including Joseph Napolitan and F. Clifton White. Napolitan, a former newspaper reporter from Springfield, Massachusetts, had entered political consulting in the 1950s and subsequently worked on campaigns in the United States and abroad. White was a Republican political organizer who had played an important role in securing Barry Goldwater's nomination for president in 1964.

The creation of AAPC coincided with changes in the organization of American election campaigns. Political parties had traditionally supplied much of the personnel and expertise needed to run elections, but candidates were increasingly employing independent specialists to conduct surveys, produce advertising and advise on campaign strategy. Napolitan was among the figures associated with this shift. His work included the use of public opinion research and television advertising in candidate campaigns, and he helped popularize the occupational title "political consultant".

The AAPC followed the establishment of the International Association of Political Consultants (IAPC), which Napolitan had co-founded with French consultant Michel Bongrand in 1968. Napolitan served as president of both organizations and later became the first inductee into AAPC's Hall of Fame.

Napolitan's 1972 book, The Election Game and How to Win It, was an early account of political campaign management written from the perspective of a professional consultant. His career included work in more than 100 American campaigns, as well as elections overseas. He died in 2013 at the age of 84.

=== Professional ethics and push polling ===
By the 1990s, AAPC had become involved in disputes over the methods used in political campaigns, particularly the use of telephone surveys to influence voters.

In December 1995, the association's ethics committee considered the practice known as push polling, in which callers deliver political messages under the guise of conducting an opinion survey. The committee concluded that deceptive push polling violated its professional code. On May 23, 1996, the association received a letter signed by 31 public opinion pollsters condemning the practice. AAPC's board subsequently adopted a declaration distinguishing legitimate survey research from calls intended to persuade voters while misrepresenting themselves as polling.

The declaration addressed a recurring disagreement within the consulting industry over the boundary between political persuasion and public opinion research. AAPC maintained that campaign calls presented as surveys were deceptive when their primary purpose was to influence voters rather than collect information.

=== Expansion of awards programs ===
During the following decades, the association developed several programs recognizing work in political consulting, including the Pollie Awards and awards for individual professional achievement.

In 2015, AAPC introduced its 40 Under 40 Awards. The inaugural class included consultants and political professionals associated with Democratic, Republican and independent organizations. That year, the Pollie Awards competition received more than 2,400 entries, according to the association.

=== Political consulting in the 2020s ===
AAPC's activities during the 2020s included litigation over automated political calls and federal pandemic relief, as well as disputes concerning regulation of artificial intelligence in political advertising.

In 2020, the association participated in two federal cases involving the legal treatment of political consulting. One reached the Supreme Court and concerned restrictions on automated calls to mobile telephones. The other challenged federal rules that excluded businesses primarily engaged in political or lobbying activities from loans under the Paycheck Protection Program.

In 2023, the association adopted a policy against the use of deceptive AI-generated images, audio and video in political campaigns. The policy was introduced as generative artificial intelligence began attracting greater attention from election officials, political campaigns and media organizations.

In 2026, AAPC reported that its membership had exceeded 2,000. It also held the first separately organized AAPC Hall of Fame Gala, on June 9 at the Willard InterContinental Washington in Washington, D.C.

== Legal cases ==
=== Automated political calls ===
AAPC was one of four plaintiffs that challenged federal restrictions on automated telephone calls in a case that reached the Supreme Court in 2020.

The Telephone Consumer Protection Act of 1991 generally prohibited certain calls to mobile telephones using automated dialing equipment or prerecorded messages without prior consent. In 2015, Congress created an exception for calls made to collect debts owed to or guaranteed by the federal government.

AAPC and the other plaintiffs argued that the exception violated the First Amendment because it treated calls differently according to their content. Political organizations remained restricted from making automated calls to mobile telephones, while callers collecting certain government-backed debts were exempt. The plaintiffs sought to invalidate the restriction rather than merely remove the exception.

The United States District Court for the Eastern District of North Carolina initially upheld the provision. In April 2019, the United States Court of Appeals for the Fourth Circuit found the government-debt exception unconstitutional, but concluded that it could be severed from the rest of the law, leaving the general robocall restriction intact. The Supreme Court agreed to hear the case in January 2020.

The Supreme Court heard arguments on May 6, 2020, and issued its decision on July 6. Six justices agreed that the government-debt exception violated the First Amendment, while seven agreed that the remedy was to remove the exception rather than strike down the broader robocall restriction. Justice Brett Kavanaugh announced the judgment and wrote the principal opinion.

The outcome was narrower than the plaintiffs had sought. Although the Court found that Congress had unconstitutionally favored government-debt collection over political and other speech, it did not give political organizations greater freedom to place automated calls. Instead, the decision subjected government-debt collectors to the same general restrictions that continued to apply to political callers.

=== Paycheck Protection Program litigation ===
AAPC was also a plaintiff in American Association of Political Consultants v. United States Small Business Administration, a 2020 lawsuit concerning access to federal emergency loans during the COVID-19 pandemic in the United States.

The case arose after Congress enacted the CARES Act, which established the Paycheck Protection Program to provide financial assistance to businesses affected by the pandemic. Existing Small Business Administration regulations made businesses primarily engaged in political or lobbying activities ineligible for certain federal loans, including loans under the program.

AAPC and Ridder/Braden, Inc., a Colorado political consulting firm, challenged the exclusion. They contended that the regulation discriminated against political speech and lobbying activity in violation of the First and Fifth Amendments. The plaintiffs requested emergency relief that would prevent the SBA from applying the exclusion to their loan applications.

On April 21, 2020, U.S. District Judge Royce C. Lamberth denied the request for a temporary restraining order and preliminary injunction. The court concluded that the plaintiffs had not shown a likelihood of success on their constitutional claims. It distinguished restrictions on political expression from the government's decision not to subsidize particular activities with public funds.

AAPC and Ridder/Braden appealed. On May 26, 2020, the United States Court of Appeals for the District of Columbia Circuit affirmed the district court's order. The appellate court held that the plaintiffs had not met the requirements for preliminary injunctive relief and were unlikely to prevail on their claim that the regulation imposed an unconstitutional condition on their First Amendment rights.

The case illustrated a different aspect of AAPC's legal advocacy from the robocall litigation. Rather than seeking relief from a restriction on campaign communications, the plaintiffs challenged the exclusion of political consulting businesses from a federal assistance program.

== Political advertising and artificial intelligence ==
=== Deepfake advertising ===
In May 2023, AAPC's board adopted a policy addressing the use of deepfake technology in election campaigns. The policy prohibited members from using deceptive AI-generated audio, imagery or video intended to mislead voters about political candidates, parties or issues. It also made advertising containing such material ineligible for the association's awards.

The policy distinguished deliberately deceptive synthetic media from parody and satire. AAPC argued that political humor and impersonation could be legitimate forms of expression, but that fabricated material presented as authentic violated its ethics rules.

The policy was among the responses by political organizations to the increasing accessibility of generative artificial intelligence tools, which could reproduce a candidate's voice or appearance without requiring traditional video production or audio recording.

=== Regulation of AI-generated political advertising ===
In February 2024, AAPC supported a Federal Communications Commission declaratory ruling that treated AI-generated voices in robocalls as artificial voices under the Telephone Consumer Protection Act. The ruling followed growing concern about synthetic voice messages in political campaigns, including an incident in New Hampshire in which voters received calls impersonating President Joe Biden.

Later that year, AAPC opposed an FCC proposal that would have required disclosures for AI-generated material in certain political advertisements. In comments submitted to the commission, the association argued that the proposed requirements were too broad and could burden constitutionally protected political expression. It also questioned whether the FCC had sufficient authority to regulate the content of political advertisements in the proposed manner.

The position placed AAPC on different sides of two related regulatory questions: it supported applying existing robocall restrictions to synthetic voices, while opposing the proposed disclosure rules for AI-generated political advertisements.

The FCC proposal formed part of a wider debate about political advertising disclosure requirements. The Electronic Privacy Information Center, among other organizations, submitted comments supporting greater transparency regarding AI-generated material in political advertisements.

== Code of ethics ==
AAPC maintains a Code of Professional Ethics to which members are required to agree annually. The code sets out standards for dealings with clients, political opponents, professional colleagues, the media and voters. Members may also be the subject of formal complaints alleging violations.

Among its provisions are prohibitions against discriminatory appeals, false or misleading attacks on opponents, misuse of confidential client information and misappropriation of client funds. The code also requires members to document criticism of political opponents and to maintain honesty in authorized dealings with the news media.

The code includes a provision concerning free and fair elections and the peaceful democratic process. AAPC has interpreted its general prohibition on deceptive practices to cover specific forms of political communication, including push polling and deliberately misleading synthetic media.

In September 2026, the association issued a statement concerning fabricated political polling. It called attention to polling organizations that lacked identifiable principals, established records or publicly available methodological information, and urged journalists and political campaigns to scrutinize the provenance of survey results.

== Awards ==
=== Pollie Awards ===
The Pollie Awards are an annual competition organized by AAPC for political advertising and campaign communications. Entries include work produced for candidates, ballot initiatives, advocacy organizations and public affairs campaigns.

The awards cover several forms of political communication, including television and radio advertising, direct mail, digital media, fundraising and campaign technology. The competition uses separate divisions for candidate and non-candidate work, together with categories open to both. Entries are judged by political and communications professionals, and competitors are required to omit identifying information about their firms from material submitted for judging.

The awards have been presented to Democratic and Republican consulting firms, as well as companies working on issue advocacy and nonpartisan campaigns. Gold, silver and bronze awards may be given within individual categories, depending on the judges' assessments.

In 2015, the association reported receiving more than 2,400 entries, the largest competition in its history at that time. The competition has continued to add categories reflecting changes in campaign communications, including digital advertising, data analytics and artificial intelligence.

=== Hall of Fame ===
AAPC's Hall of Fame recognizes political consultants and other professionals whose work has had a lasting influence on the field. Its first inductee was Joseph Napolitan, who also served as the association's first president.

Inductees have included consultants, pollsters, campaign managers and political advertising professionals affiliated with both major political parties. The awards had historically been presented in connection with the association's conference and other recognition events.

In June 2026, AAPC held its inaugural standalone Hall of Fame Gala in Washington, D.C.

=== Other awards ===
AAPC operates several additional recognition programs.

The Campaign Excellence Awards recognize individual contributions to electoral and public affairs campaigns. The 40 Under 40 Awards, established in 2015, recognize younger professionals working in American politics. Recipients are selected from candidates associated with Democratic, Republican and independent organizations.

The Trailblazer Awards recognize individuals and organizations associated with developments in political consulting and public affairs. The Top Ops Awards focus on campaign operations, including staff members, party committee personnel and professionals working for political action committees and interest groups.

== Conferences and events ==
AAPC holds an annual conference in conjunction with the Pollie Awards. The event includes discussions on political advertising, campaign strategy, polling, technology and other subjects associated with electoral politics. The association also organizes regional meetings, training programs and events examining recent election results.

The 2026 Pollie Awards and Conference took place March 24–26 on Amelia Island, Florida. The 2027 conference is scheduled for April 12–14 in Phoenix, Arizona.

== AAPC Foundation ==
The AAPC Foundation is an organization separate from AAPC that conducts research and educational work concerning political communication and elections. Its research has examined the effects of political advertising disclosures and the use of artificial intelligence as an election information source.

=== Political advertising research ===
One of the foundation's research projects, The Disclaimer Effect, examined how voters interpreted disclosure notices attached to political advertisements containing AI-generated material. The study investigated whether disclosures improved voters' understanding of political advertising or influenced their trust in its content.

The research formed part of a broader debate over whether mandatory labels on AI-assisted advertising effectively distinguish deceptive political content from the routine use of technology in campaign production.

=== 2026 AI Voter Study ===
On October 5, 2026, the foundation released a national study examining voters' use of artificial intelligence in connection with elections. The report was presented at the Power, Politics, & AI Forum at George Washington University in Washington, D.C.

The survey was conducted September 14–22, 2026, among 1,568 likely voters. According to the foundation, approximately one-quarter of respondents used artificial intelligence daily and 61 percent used it at least several times per month. The study also found that AI-generated search summaries had become a source of election information for some voters, although relatively few respondents identified AI as their most trusted source of political information.

The research examined attitudes toward synthetic political media, including fabricated candidate audio and video. Respondents were generally more concerned about the potential effect of political deepfakes on other voters than on their own voting decisions.

== Organization ==
AAPC is governed by a board of directors. The association's governance structure includes representatives associated with both major American political parties. In 2024, it described its board as consisting of 32 members, divided equally between Democrats and Republicans.

Membership is open to professionals working in political consulting and related fields, including campaign management, advertising, opinion research, fundraising, lobbying and public affairs. The association is headquartered in McLean, Virginia.

AAPC reported having more than 1,700 members in 2024 and more than 2,000 in September 2026.

== See also ==
- Political consulting
- Political campaign
- Political advertising
- International Association of Political Consultants
- Campaign management
- Opinion polling
- Telephone Consumer Protection Act of 1991
- Political communication
