= SKDK =

American public affairs and political consulting firm

- Type: Private
- Industry: Public affairs, political consulting
- Founded: 2004
- Founder: Bob Squier; William Knapp
- Parent: Stagwell (since 2015)
- Website: skdknick.com

SKDK (formerly SKDKnickerbocker) is a public affairs and political consulting firm that specializes in working for Democratic Party politicians. It has offices in Washington, D.C., New York City, Los Angeles, California, and Albany, New York. The firm employs notable figures like former Obama White House Communications Director Anita Dunn, and Hilary Rosen.

== History ==
The firm was formed in 2004 through the merger of Squier Knapp Dunn Communications and Knickerbocker Consulting. Before he graduated from college, future New York politician Micah Lasher was a founding partner of the firm. In 2010 The New York Times reported that Lasher "has been called a political whiz kid ever since he helped to found an influential political consulting firm while still in college."

They formalized the merger in 2010, taking the name SKDKnickerbocker.

SKDK's political clients have included Barack Obama and Joe Biden, as well as the campaigns of Michael Bloomberg, Mark Kelly, Ned Lamont, Wes Moore, Laura Kelly, Debbie Dingell, Joe Donnelly, Gary Peters, Michael Bennet, Josh Gottheimer, Seth Moulton, Joseph Morelle, Sara Jacobs, and Christine Quinn. The firm has also worked for several women's rights advocates including Planned Parenthood, lawyer and activist Sandra Fluke, the Center for Reproductive Rights, and the Time's Up Legal Defense Fund.

In 2011 SKDK was hired by New York Governor Andrew Cuomo to lead the public campaign to build support for the state's legalization of gay marriage. In 2014 SKDK lead the communications war room for the Human Rights Council during two landmark Supreme Court decisions affirming the right to marriage for gay couples.

In 2014 SKDK Partner Jill Zuckman led the pro-bono public relations campaign that led to the Cuban government releasing American political prisoner Alan Gross. The release led to an improvement in U.S.-Cuba relations.

In October 2015 the firm was acquired by The Stagwell Group, of which Mark Penn is the principal, for an estimated $75 million.

In 2018 SKDK Partner Hilary Rosen co-founded the Time's Up Legal Defense Fund. The firm also represented Christine Blasey Ford during the Senate confirmation hearings for U.S. Supreme Court Justice Brett Kavanaugh.

In February 2020 the firm acquired Sloane & Co. from MDC Partners. Sloane & Co. operates as an independent unit of SKDK that offers services including mergers and acquisitions support, shareholder activism and governance, regulatory issues, investor relations, restructuring and media campaigns. In May 2023, the firm acquired Jasper Advisors, which also operates as an independent unit of SKDK, focused on clients in business and sports.

On 11 March 2023, Politico reported that TikTok hired SKDK for communications support amidst the app facing legal challenges in Washington, D.C., and a possible federal ban.

In early 2025, SKDK formally registered as a foreign agent to represent Israel. In August 2025, Foreign Agents Registration Act (FARA) filings by SKDK showed that it was a subcontractor for French PR firm Havas in an effort to use a "bot-based program" to promote Israel's Ministry of Foreign Affairs messaging, train spokespeople, liaising with media, and testing the effectiveness of using social media influencers. The contract was worth $600,000 and was to run from April 2025 until March 2026. A day after the report, SKDK stated that the contract was cut short as the work "had run its course".

== Political consulting and communications ==
SKDK provides political consulting services to political candidates, campaigns, and issue advocacy groups. SKDK describes itself as a full-service public affairs practice that offers crisis communications, branding, marketing, media training, digital/social media advice, speech writing, and message development.

Ben White of Politico wrote in an April 2014 email blast that an unnamed senior Democrat said that "It's an open secret in the Dem consultant community that SKD has been signing up clients based on 'perceived White House access' tied to prior relationships and employment." It was reported that Rosen's and Dunn's names appeared frequently on the White House visitor log. According to a 2012 article by Lee Fang for Republic Report, "SKDKnickerbocker is led by a team of former Democratic operatives and key White House figures. But instead of promoting a progressive agenda, or even an Obama agenda, these consultants score huge contracts by helping corporate interests lobby for policies that are not in line with the public interest". However, the firm does not meet the standard, legal definition of lobbying and is not registered to lobby the federal government.

In 2020, SKDK was embroiled in controversy when it received a $35 million no-bid contract for voter turnout-out work in California.
