= Dan Pfeiffer =

American political advisor and commentator (born 1975)

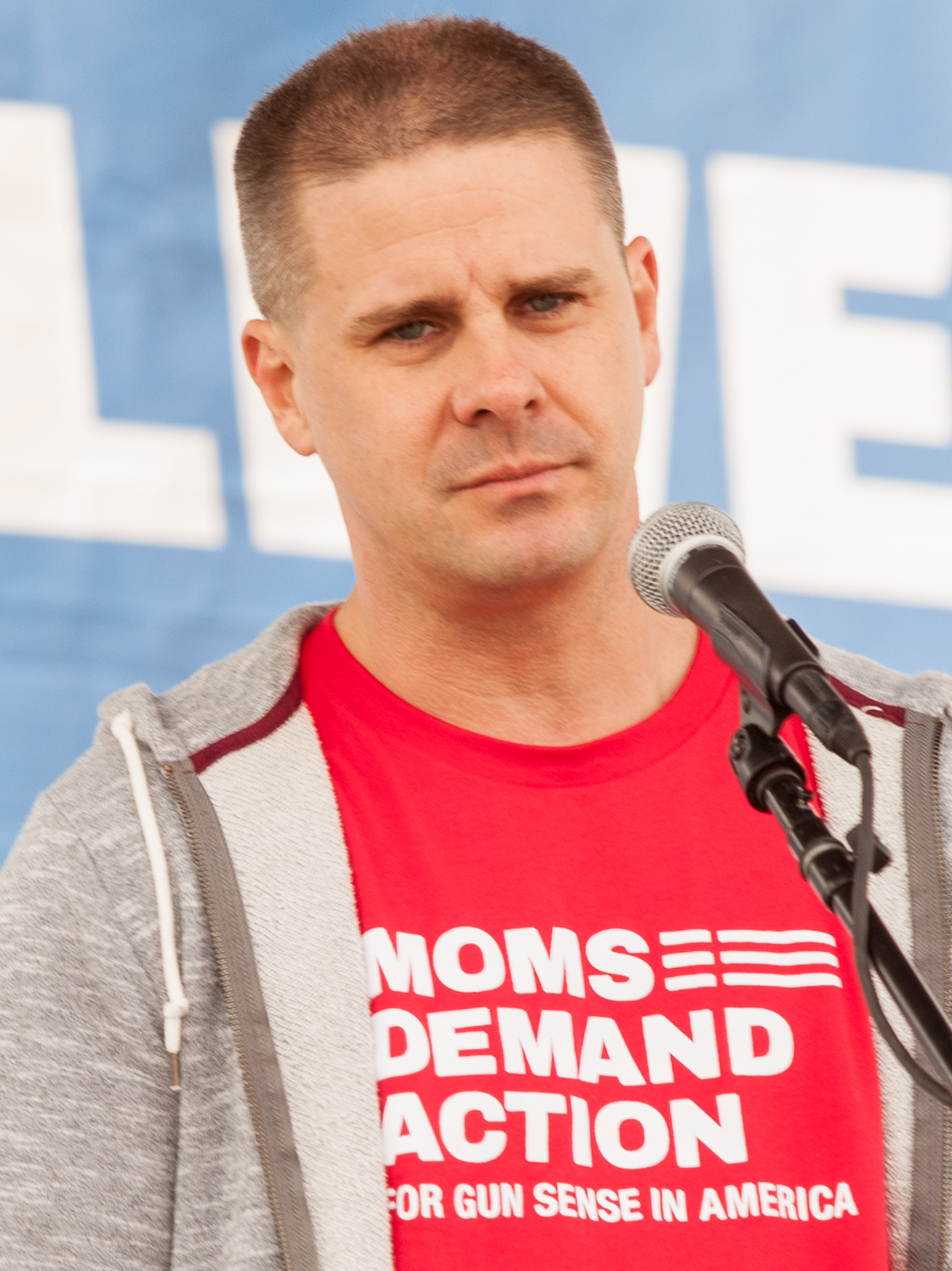
- Pfeiffer in 2018

Senior Advisor to the President
- In office January 25, 2013 – March 6, 2015
- President: Barack Obama
- Preceded by: David Plouffe
- Succeeded by: Shailagh Murray

White House Communications Director
- In office November 30, 2009 – January 25, 2013
- President: Barack Obama
- Preceded by: Anita Dunn (acting)
- Succeeded by: Jennifer Palmieri

Personal details
- Born: Daniel Pfeiffer; December 24, 1975 (age 50) Wilmington, Delaware, U.S.
- Party: Democratic
- Spouses: Sarah Feinberg (m. 2006; div. 2011) Howli Ledbetter (m. 2016)
- Children: 2
- Education: Georgetown University (BA)

Daniel Pfeiffer (born December 24, 1975) is an American political advisor, author, and podcast host. He was senior advisor to President Barack Obama for strategy and communications from 2013 to 2015.

Pfeiffer was a long-time aide to Obama, serving in various press and communications roles on the Barack Obama 2008 presidential campaign, on the presidential transition of Barack Obama, and in the White House Office. He co-hosts Pod Save America, a political podcast, with Jon Favreau, Jon Lovett, and Tommy Vietor. In 2015, Pfeiffer joined CNN as a political contributor. Pfeiffer has also authored three books.

== Early life and education ==
Pfeiffer was born in Wilmington, Delaware, the son of Vivian Lear (née Strange), a learning specialist, and Gary Malick Pfeiffer, a financial officer for DuPont. He graduated from Wilmington Friends School and earned a bachelor of Arts degree from Georgetown University.

== Career ==
Pfeiffer began his career in politics working as a spokesman for the Community Oriented Policing Services during the Clinton administration. In 2000, he joined the communications team of the Al Gore 2000 presidential campaign.

Following the 2000 United States presidential election, he went to work for the Democratic Governors Association, and later worked for Senators Tim Johnson, Tom Daschle, and Evan Bayh. He served briefly as communications director for the Evan Bayh 2008 presidential campaign.

=== Obama administration ===
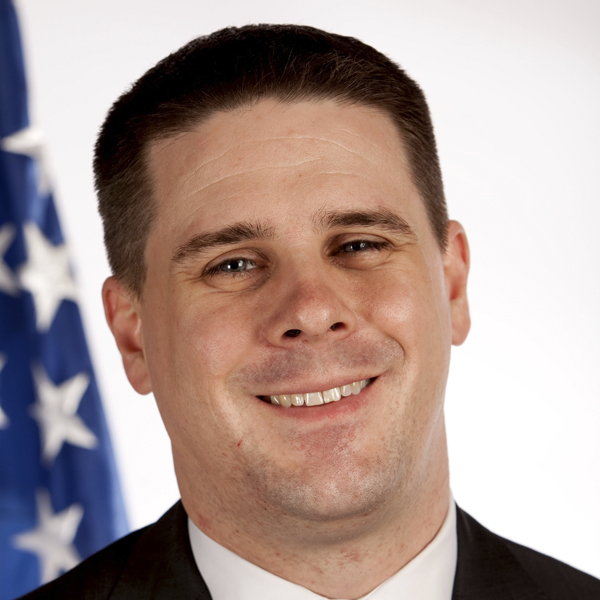
Official White House Photo of Pfeiffer as Assistant to the President Barack Obama

After the 2008 United States presidential election, Pfeiffer ran the communications office for the Obama–Biden Transition team and was then appointed deputy White House communications director after the first inauguration of Barack Obama. Less than a year later, after the departure of Anita Dunn, Pfeiffer was named White House communications director. He remained in the role for the entire first term of the Obama presidency. At the start of President Obama's second term, Pfeiffer was promoted to senior advisor for strategy and communications, taking over most of the portfolio previously managed in the White House Office by David Axelrod and David Plouffe. He left the White House on March 6, 2015.

=== Writing ===
Pfeiffer is the author of a No. 1 New York Times Best Seller, Yes We (Still) Can: Politics in the Age of Obama, Twitter, and Trump (2018). In his first book, Pfeiffer tells the story of "how Barack Obama navigated the insane political forces that created [President] Trump, explaining why everyone got 2016 wrong, and offering a path for where Democrats go from here."

In February 2020, Pfeiffer published his second book, Un-Trumping America: A Plan to Make America a Democracy Again. In it, Pfeiffer outlines how Donald Trump became president because of the current state of American politics, not in spite of it. He also offered a plan for Democrats to win the 2020 United States presidential election and how to prevent the likes of Trump from ever happening again by fixing American democracy.

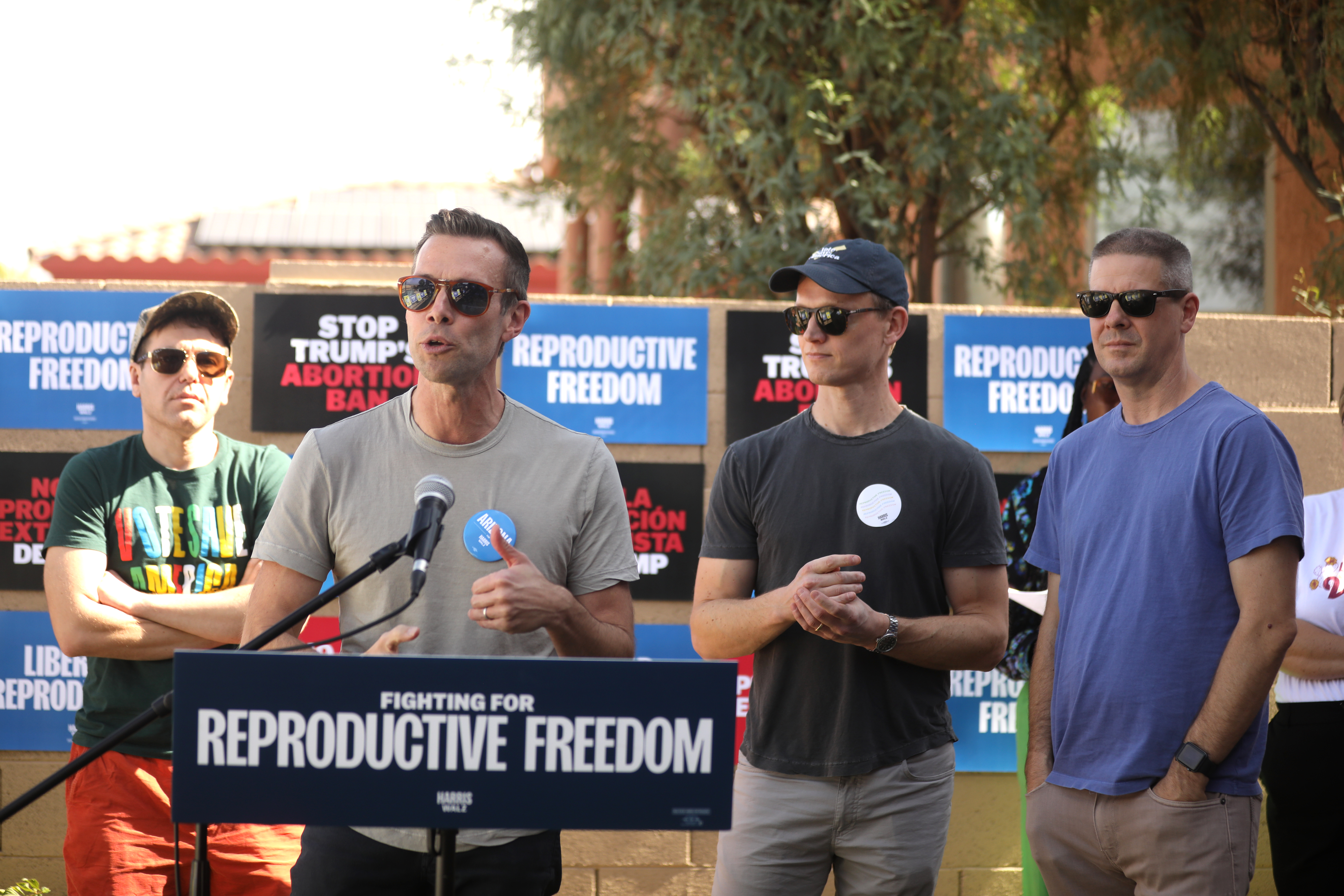
Pfeiffer with his Pod Save America cohosts at a canvass launch for Kamala Harris 2024 presidential campaign in Phoenix, Arizona

Pfeiffer's third book, Battling the Big Lie: How Fox, Facebook, and the MAGA Media Are Destroying America was published in June 2022. It explores the role of disinformation in American politics and the impact it had on elections in 2016 and 2020, as well as presents strategies for fighting back against disinformation.

=== Other work ===
After leaving the White House, Pfeiffer was vice president for communications and Policy at GoFundMe from December 2015 to September 2017. Pfeiffer is a member of the board of advisors of Let America Vote, a voting rights organization.

== Personal life ==
On July 16, 2006, Pfeiffer married Sarah Elizabeth Feinberg, a senior adviser and spokeswoman for Rahm Emanuel. In 2011, Pfeiffer and Feinberg separated, and later divorced.

In 2016, Pfeiffer married Howli Ledbetter, former director of message planning in the White House Office during the Obama administration. In May 2018, Ledbetter gave birth to a daughter, Kyla. In March 2021, their second child, Jack, was born.

== Bibliography ==
- Pfeiffer, Dan (June 19, 2018). Yes We (Still) Can: Politics in the Age of Obama, Twitter, and Trump. New York: Twelve. p. 304. ISBN 978-1538711712.
- Pfeiffer, Dan (February 18, 2020). Un-Trumping America: A Plan to Make America a Democracy Again. New York: Twelve. p. 304. ISBN 978-1538733554.
- Pfeiffer, Dan (June 7, 2022). Battling the Big Lie: How Fox, Facebook, and the MAGA Media Are Destroying America. New York: Twelve. p. 336. ISBN 978-1538707975.

Political offices
Preceded by Anita Dunn; Acting	White House Director of Communications; 2009–2013	Succeeded by Jennifer Palmieri
Preceded by David Plouffe	Senior Advisor to the President; 2013–2015; With: Brian Deese; Valerie Jarrett	Succeeded by Shailagh Murray
