= Linda Moore (businesswoman) =

American businesswoman and political strategist

- Born: 1961 (age 64–65)
- Education: University of Texas
- Occupations: CEO, TechNet
- Political party: Democratic

Linda Moore is an American businesswoman and political strategist, the CEO of tech policy advocacy organization TechNet. Previously, she was Field Director for the Democratic Leadership Council, Deputy Political Director of the Clinton White House, and Senior Advisor to Indiana Senator Evan Bayh, in addition to being a staff member of five U.S. presidential campaigns.

== Early life and education ==
Moore was born in Texas, and graduated from the University of Texas at Austin in 1984. During school she worked for the Lloyd Doggett 1984 campaign for the United States Senate.

== Career ==
=== Early years and Clinton Administration ===
After graduation, Moore moved to Washington, D.C. and continued working with political campaigns, joining the staff of Dick Gephardt's 1988 presidential bid. She later joined the Democratic Leadership Council, a center-left organization that promoted the ideals of the New Democrats and backed Bill Clinton in the 1992 presidential election. She became the field director, turning it into the policy and political backbone of the Clinton campaign.

Moore worked in the White House during both terms of the Clinton Administration. She initially was a special assistant to the President, a styling given to tertiary staffers. During the second term, she became deputy assistant to the President, a second-level staff position, and also in the second term as the deputy political director in the Office of Political Affairs. Moore took a leave in the fall of 1996 as deputy political director for the Clinton-Gore reelection campaign.

=== Post-White House and TechNet ===
In 2001, following her tenure in the White House, Moore joined the staff of Indiana Senator Evan Bayh, at the time a leading force for moderate and centrist Democrats, as his senior advisor until 2011. Her influence in that capacity extended to both his political dealings in Congress and his chairmanship of the Democratic Leadership Council.

She was recruited by John Kerry's 2004 presidential campaign as political director for John Edwards, Kerry's running mate. In 2008, she was brought on to Hillary Clinton's campaign as a senior advisor and director of congressional affairs.

In the fall of 2011, Moore was named a resident fellow at Harvard Institute of Politics (IOP), where she led a weekly seminar on the decline of centrists and the increase of polarization in both parties and its impact on policy and politics. Moore then was on Harvard IOP's Fellows Alumni Advisory Council. In March 2012, Moore was appointed by then-Secretary of State Hillary Clinton to the U.S. National Commission for the United Nations Education, Science and Cultural Organization (UNESCO).

In February 2014, Moore was named president and CEO of TechNet, a technology based advocacy group backing the interests of companies such as Microsoft, Google, and Apple. In May 2014, Moore was named to the board of the Women's High-Tech Coalition, a non-partisan organization of women technology executives. In 2015, she was included in FedScoop's list of Top 50 Women in Technology. In 2016, Wired listed her as one of a new class of tech insiders in the political elite with great influence in the 2016 presidential election.

Moore is an advocate of increasing women's access to and representation in STEM related fields, and has written that the acceptance and inclusion of computer science in secondary schooling curricula is integral in maintaining the United States' competitiveness, as well as ensuring that such curricula are open and available to women and other demographics that remain underrepresented in those fields.

== Publications ==
- "LAX Doesn't Fly in Rideshare Era." Los Angeles Business Journal, November 17, 2015.
- "The Question That Should Be Asked at the GOP Debate… But Probably Won't Be." Morning Consult, August 6, 2015.
- "Trans-Pacific Partnership Will Help Ensure Global Leadership of U.S. Innovation Sector." The Hill, January 26, 2016.
- "Computer Science is the Key to America's Skills Crisis." TechCrunch, March 4, 2016.
- "Computers Will Boost R.I. Students." The Providence Journal, April 16, 2016.
- "Fix America's Ailing International Tax System." The Hill, April 26, 2016.
- "5 Steps Trump Must Take to Grow Jobs and the Economy." CNBC, November 16, 2016.
- "A Million New American Jobs? Our Nation's Startups Can Help With That." The Hill, April 4, 2017.
- "A New Wave of Innovation and Job Creation." Morning Consult, April 28, 2017.
- "Two Years After OPM Cyberattack, More Must Be Done." Morning Consult, June 13, 2017.
- "Tax Reform Could Create 5 Million Jobs." Washington Examiner, June 14, 2017.
- “L.A. Should Make it Easier to Enjoy Home-Sharing Opportunities: Guest Commentary” Los Angeles Daily News, September 29, 2017.
- "Amazon's Headquarters Hunt a Wake-Up Call on U.S. Education" The Hill, October 18, 2017.
- "Modernize NAFTA, Don't Ditch It" Washington Examiner, January 29, 2018.
- "Atlanta's Cyberattack Underscores Our Nation's Cyber Insecurity" Morning Consult, April 13, 2018
- "Financial Innovation Is Key to Empowering Consumers With More Credit Options" Morning Consult, August 16, 2018.
- "Tariffs on Data Centers Threaten Jobs in Every State" Morning Consult, October 29, 2018.
- "Heed Economic Lessons of Shutting Down Government" The Hill, February 20, 2019.
- "One Year On, What Can We Learn from GDPR?" TECHTalk, May 25, 2019.
- "The ADA 29 Years Later: Technology's Growing Role in Supporting Individuals with Disabilities" TECHTalk, July 26, 2019.
- "More Must Be Done to Help Our Nation's Veterans Secure Jobs" TECHTalk, November 11, 2019.
- "TechNet CEO Linda Moore: USMCA Offers Necessary, Modernized Reset for Trade - It Deserves Bipartisan Support" Fox Business, December 4, 2019.
- "During COVID-19, Tech Companies Prioritize Their Workers" "TECHtalk", April 15, 2020.
- "Leave No Small Business Behind in COVID-19 Response" "Morning Consult", May 29, 2020.
- "TechNet's Commitment to Reversing Systemic Racism" "TECHtalk", June 2, 2020.
- "Congress Must Act Now to Protect Dreamers" "Morning Consult", June 23, 2021.
- "Fundamentally Altering Antitrust Laws Will Harm US Startups And Slow the Economy" "TechCrunch", October 28, 2021.
- "Congress should prioritize data privacy protections" "The Hill", February 28, 2022.
- "Opinion: How Congress can help Bay Area innovators fight patent trolls" "Mercury News", December 15, 2022.
- "Guest commentary: Why a congressional AM radio mandate is a bad idea" "Automotive News", June 24, 2024.
