= Future Forward PAC =

Super PAC in the 2024 US presidential election

- Tax ID no.: 824170762 a 501(c)(4); C00669259 a Hybrid PAC
- Legal status: Super PAC
- Leader: Chauncey McLean
- Website: futureforwardusa.org

The Future Forward PAC is the largest Democratic Party Super PAC. It was the Kamala Harris campaign's main Super PAC and leading fundraising vehicle in the 2024 presidential election. It set a record for fundraising as an organization not affiliated with a candidate in 2024 by raising over $950 million.

== History ==
The organization is led by Chauncey McLean, who formerly worked for the Obama campaign. When the PAC was formed in 2020, the Biden campaign initially worried that it was created to support the Trump campaign. It later became apparent that the PAC had instead raised $100 million for Biden campaign ads, mostly from Silicon Valley-based mega-donors. When Guy Cecil stepped down from leading the Priorities USA PAC in March 2024, the Biden campaign communicated to donors that Future Forward should be the new target for large donations.

After Biden withdrew from the election, the PAC shifted its messaging to the 2024 Kamala Harris presidential campaign. It raised over $700 million, conducted millions of voter surveys, and produced thousands of ads. Michael Bloomberg and Bill Gates both reportedly donated $50 million to the PAC. Gates' donation was made to the Future Forward USA Action arm of Future Forward, which does not disclose its donors. Future Forward Action then transfers the funds to Future Forward for use in its ad campaigns. The PAC is notable for its operational secrecy, and its deeply analytical approach.

Pollster David Shor; former Biden adviser Anita Dunn; Katie Perelius, a former Biden fundraiser; and Kara Swisher, a former New York Times opinion columnist, have been described as Future Forward operatives.

== Operations ==
=== Advertisements ===
The PAC is said to be highly data-driven, relying on a process of testing and refining to decide which ads will reach likely voters in ad slots reserved months ahead of the key election season. Voters are surveyed for responses that help in this process. During the 2024 campaign, the PAC utilized the survey services of GCJ Research, a firm founded by Gaurav Shirole and Jon Fromowitz, and ran over 14 million surveys. Once voter sentiments are understood, the PAC generates various potential ads. These are tested, ranked, and refined. For every one ad that aired, twenty potential alternatives are tested.

Future Forward seeks to target "everyone at once" towards the tail end of the race, homing in on messages that resonate with a broad base of voters. This approach was controversial among Harris campaign advisers, who wanted the PAC to target specific demographic groups, like black voters.

=== Other disbursements ===
Future Forward also disburses funds to other democratic organizations. In 2024, in gave tens of millions of dollars to America Votes in an effort to boost field programs.
