= Public affairs =

Public affairs may refer to:

- A broad field encompassing public administration, politics, and advocacy – see outline of public affairs
- Public affairs (broadcasting), radio or television programs that focus on matters of politics and public policy
- Public affairs (military), offices of the US Department of Defense that deal with the media
- Public Affairs (political party), former Czech political party
- Public Affairs Council, American professional association for people working in public administration and policy
- Public affairs industry
- Public relations as a profession

== Publishing ==
- PublicAffairs, American publishing company
- Public Affairs Press, 20th-century publishing house based in Washington, DC
- Public Affairs Quarterly, American philosophy journal

== See also ==
- Public Affairs Council (disambiguation)
- A Public Affair, a 2006 album by Jessica Simpson
  - "A Public Affair" (song), from Simpson's album
