= Anita Dunn =

American political strategist (born 1958)

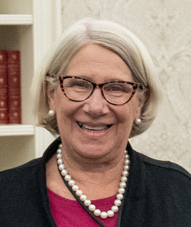
- Dunn in 2023

Senior Advisor to the President for Communications
- In office May 5, 2022 – August 2024
- In office January 20, 2021 – August 12, 2021
- President: Joe Biden
- Preceded by: Jared Kushner; Stephen Miller; Ivanka Trump
- Succeeded by: Ben LaBolt; Karine Jean-Pierre

White House Communications Director
- Acting; April 21, 2009 – November 30, 2009
- President: Barack Obama
- Preceded by: Ellen Moran
- Succeeded by: Daniel Pfeiffer

Personal details
- Born: Anita Babbitt; January 8, 1958 (age 68)
- Party: Democratic
- Spouse: Robert Bauer
- Children: 2
- Education: University of Maryland, College Park (BA)

Anita Dunn (née Babbitt; born January 8, 1958) is an American political strategist who served as a senior advisor to President Joe Biden, holding the post from January 2021 to August 2021, and again from May 2022 to August 2024.

Previously, she served as acting White House Communications Director in the Obama White House. Additionally, she was a founding member of SKDK, a public affairs and political consulting firm in Washington, D.C., where she has also served as managing director. She was also an advisor to the Biden presidential transition. Dunn has worked on six Democratic presidential campaigns over a period of 40 years. She also served as a senior adviser to the Future Forward PAC, the main SuperPAC supporting Kamala Harris's presidential campaign, in 2024.

== Early life and education ==
Dunn was raised in Bethesda, Maryland, the daughter of Albert E. Babbitt and Carol (Hutto) Babbitt. Her uncle was the modernist composer Milton Babbitt. She attended Walter Johnson High School, graduating in 1976. She earned a Bachelor of Arts degree from the University of Maryland, College Park.

== Career ==
Dunn began her career in the Carter White House, first as an intern for White House Communications Director Gerald Rafshoon and then worked for chief of staff Hamilton Jordan.

She worked on the campaign of U.S. Senator John Glenn (D-OH) in 1984, and on Capitol Hill before joining the firm founded by Bob Squier and William Knapp in 1993. She was the adviser and communications director to Senator Bill Bradley (D-NJ), and served as the chief strategist for his presidential campaign.

Dunn also served as advisor to Senator Evan Bayh (D-IN), former Senate Majority Leader Tom Daschle (D-SD) and as communications director for Al Gore's presidential campaign in 2000.

In 2004, Dunn produced the media for Congressman Lloyd Doggett (D-TX). In 2006, she was hired by then-Senator Barack Obama to direct communications and strategy for his political action committee, The Hopefund. This move signaled to many that Obama was planning to run for the presidency. While advising Hopefund and Obama in 2006, she was instrumental in the preparations for the launch of Obama for America, and brought many key staffers to the Obama campaign with whom she had worked in Bayh's and Daschle's offices.

=== Obama campaign ===
In April 2008, it was announced that Dunn, who had joined the Obama campaign in February, would be the director of communications, policy and research operations for Obama for America, where she held the title Senior Adviser and was one of the major decision makers of the Obama campaign. She was featured as one of four top advisers (along with David Axelrod, David Plouffe, and Robert Gibbs) in a 60 Minutes interview held after then-President-elect Obama's November 4, 2008, victory speech at Grant Park, Chicago, Illinois. She was described, in the 60 Minutes interview, as, "a relative newcomer who handled communications, research and policy."

=== White House Communications Director, and Mao Zedong Controversy ===
Dunn served as interim White House Communications Director from April to November 2009. She took the lead in the Obama administration's criticism of the Fox News Channel, leveling harsh criticisms against its apparent bias in favor of the Republican Party and against Bill Ayers and ACORN.

Dunn made controversial comments in reference to Mao Zedong that drew the ire of conservative media during a June 2009 commencement address at St. Andrew’s Episcopal High School, in Washington, D.C. Dunn said: "The third lesson and tip actually come from two of my favorite political philosophers: Mao Zedong and Mother Teresa. [They're] not often coupled with each other, but the two people that I turn to most to basically deliver a simple point, which is, you're going to make choices. You're going to challenge, you're going to say, 'Why not?'. You’re going to figure out how to do things that have never been done before." Dunn replied to the criticism: "The Mao quote is one I picked up from the late Republican strategist Lee Atwater from something I read in the late 1980s, so I hope I don't get my progressive friends mad at me. ... The use of the phrase 'favorite political philosophers' was intended as irony, but clearly the effort fell flat – at least with a certain Fox commentator whose sense of irony may be missing."

Dunn left her interim post one month following the comments, at the end of November 2009 and was replaced by her deputy Dan Pfeiffer.

=== Between campaigns ===
After leaving the White House, Dunn rejoined SKDK. During this interim, Dunn was known as "a close friend of President Obama." Although working for a lobbying firm, White House records show that Dunn maintained strong connections with the administration, having visited over 100 times between her departure in 2009 and 2012. At the same time the firm announced a "major expansion" emphasizing strategic communications and advocacy work for business. The firm added about a dozen Obama administration insiders as the firm's staff doubled in size. Among the major clients the firm took on were General Electric, AT&T, Time Warner, and Pratt & Whitney. In particular, SKDK corporate clients have included such controversial companies as the for-profit Kaplan University and TransCanada Corp., the developer of the Keystone XL pipeline.

Other SKDK clients include New York City landlords and real estate associations resisting stronger rent protections for tenants, big food companies such as General Mills, Pepsi Co, Nestle, Kellogg, Viacom, and McDonalds in their work to resist Obama-era nutritional standards for marketing foods to children, and Google and Pfizer in their campaign to cut taxes on foreign profits. SKDK also produced ads urging citizens and legislators to support charter schools.

=== Media ===
During her career, Dunn has been a guest or panelist on The Daily Show, 60 Minutes, Meet the Press, Face the Nation, CBS This Morning, MTP Daily, At This Hour, Deadline: White House, This Week, and State of the Union. Dunn was also interviewed for two documentaries, The Circus: Inside the Greatest Political Show on Earth and JFK: The Making of Modern Politics.

=== 2012 Obama campaign ===
During the 2012 Obama campaign, Dunn helped Obama prepare for the debates. When Journalist Lee Fang asked Dunn if she felt it was "disingenuous" to advise Barack Obama's 2012 re-election campaign "while simultaneously being paid by a lot of corporations to lobby against his reforms" Dunn said in her response, "I work with some corporations because the fact of the matter is we're in a democracy and there's a dialogue and people have a right to be heard. And the fact of the matter is that most of the time when I work with people, they have a story to be told and we tell it."

=== Harvey Weinstein ===
Ahead of reporting in The New York Times about Harvey Weinstein's alleged sexual abuse, Weinstein reached out to Dunn for public relations advice. Dunn's firm stated that she was not paid for this, "was asked to speak with him by a friend" and that Weinstein was not a client of hers. The New York Times later reported that Dunn told Weinstein in an email "you should accept your fate graciously, and not seek to deny or discredit those who your behaviour has affected", noting that Dunn had apparently used the British spelling. However, according to reporting from CNN, that email was actually written by a British man named James Linton in an attempt to elicit incriminating statements from Weinstein.

=== 2020 Biden campaign ===
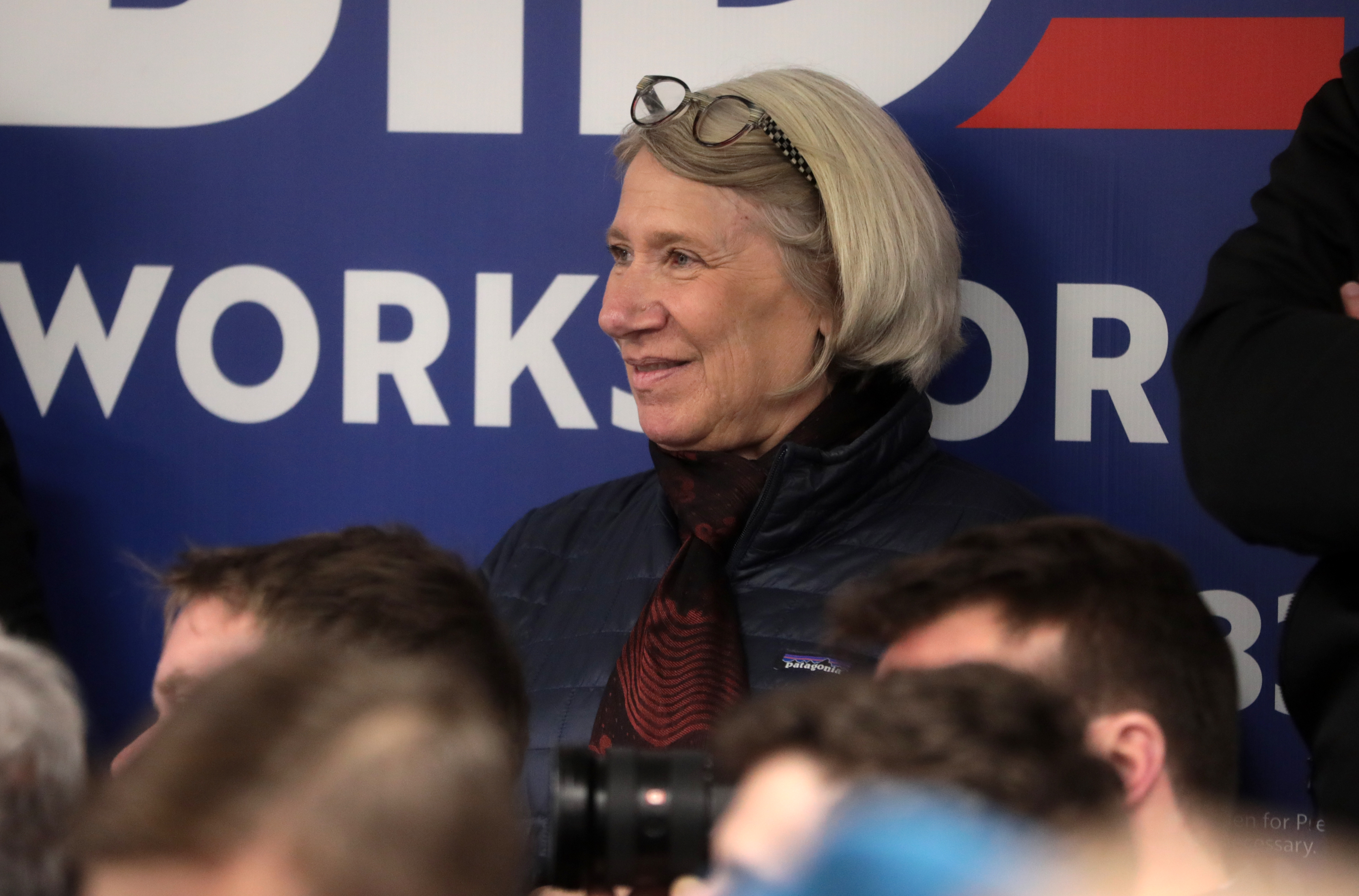
Dunn at a campaign event for Joe Biden in January 2020.

Dunn was hired as a senior advisor to Joe Biden's 2020 presidential campaign in 2019 to assist with communications strategy. She first met Biden in the 1980s during her time as the communications director for the Democratic Senatorial Campaign Committee, and they reconnected in 2008 when Biden was named as Obama's running mate. After Biden's disappointing fourth-place finish in the 2020 Iowa Democratic caucuses, Dunn was elevated to a more senior position managing overall campaign strategy, personnel, and finances.

On September 5, 2020, Dunn was announced to be a co-chair of the Biden-Harris Transition Team, which planned the presidential transition of Joe Biden. After Biden's victory in the general election, The Atlantic reported that Dunn was "the only person in modern presidential politics who has been in the inner circle of two winning candidates—first Barack Obama's and now Biden's."

=== Biden administration ===
On January 15, 2021, it was announced that Dunn would serve as a senior advisor to the president of the United States in the Biden administration. Dunn worked alongside fellow senior advisors Mike Donilon and Cedric Richmond.

Dunn and her husband, Robert Bauer, assisted President Biden in preparation for the June 27 presidential debate during the 2024 presidential election campaign.

In July 2024, it was reported that Dunn would be leaving her White House post to move over to the Future Forward PAC, supporting Kamala Harris's presidential campaign.

== Personal life ==
Dunn is married to Robert Bauer, former partner at the law firm Perkins Coie and former personal counsel to President Obama and the White House Counsel. They have two children.

In 2008, Newsweek named Dunn and Bauer the new "power couple" in Washington, D.C.

Political offices
Preceded by Ellen Moran	White House Director of Communications; Acting; 2009	Succeeded by Dan Pfeiffer
